= Hirde Shah =

Raja of Garha from 1634 to 1668

Raja of Garha
- Reign: 1634–1668
- Predecessor: Prem Narain
- Successor: Chhatra Shah
- Dynasty: Rajgond
- Father: Prem Narain
- Religion: Islam

Hridayshah, name also spelled Hirde Shah, was the 54th and last great king of Garha-Mandla. Hridayshah was a great patron and lover of music, and wrote the musical compositions of "Hriday Koutuk" and "Hriday Prakash" in 1660. He moved his kingdom's capital from Chouragarh to Ramnagar of Mandla district to secure it from Bundela attacks.

== Reign ==
When Madhukar Shah, Chandra Shah's successor committed suicide, Prem Narain, his eldest son who was in Delhi at the Mughal court, rushed back to Garha. While going, he left his eldest son Hirde Shah at the court. Jhujhar Singh of Orchha invaded and killed Prem Narain by treachery and his cunning. However, Hridayshah retook the kingdom from Jhujhar Singh with Mughal interference and help.

Hridayshah was a Gond ruler. He maintained friendly relations with the Mughals, he spent days at the imperial court in Delhi as well. His father Prem Narain had converted to Hinduism but Hridayshah adopted Islam, being first Gond king to become Muslim.

According to Eyre Chatterton, he had a keen interest in taking care of animals, especially tigers, of whom he had 16. A genealogy of the Gond kings of Mandla was prepared by a Hindu named Jaya Govinda on his orders in Sanskrit on a tablet, now found on the walls of the Gond royal palace at Ramnagar, near Mandla. During the reign of Mughal emperor Shah Jahan, Pahad Singh Bundela of Orchha attacked Hirde Shah, hence he shifted his capital to Mandla. This was the second time the Bundelas of Orchha had attacked Garha.

He was a descendant of the great Sangram Shah and a close relative of the valiant Gond queen, Rani Durgavati's family. Moti Mahal was built by him 350 years ago, which is a wonderful example of the architecture of that time. He also built 'Begum Mahal' for the queen and 'Badal Mahal' for the generals. The Gond royal palace at Ramnagar was built by Hriday Shah around 1630 AD, when he made Ramnagar his capital.

== Legacy ==
Hriday Shah was the last great king of Garha-Mandla. After his death, no great ruler appeared and court intrigue was common, greatly weakening the state. They alternatively invited Aurangzeb and the Marathas for help. It ceded away portions of its territory and revenues to buy off its enemies. Thus when the Maratha peshwa made demands, the king of Mandla, Narhar Shah, could not fulfill them and was defeated by the Maratha king of Nagpur and the kingdom annexed.
