= Ajanbahu Jatbasha =

Founder of the Gond dynasty of Chhindwara and Nagpur

Jatba
- Maharaja

King of Deogarh
- Reign: 1580–1620 or 1542–1602
- Predecessor: Ransur and Ghansur
- Successor: Dal Shah
- Died: 1620 or 1602
- Issue: Dal Shah, Durg Shah, Kok Shah and Kesari Shah
- Ajanbahu Jatbasha
- House: Gonds of Deogarh
- Dynasty: Rajgond

Ajanbahu Jatbasha (also known as Jatba or King Jatav) is considered by historians to be founder of the Gond dynasty of Chhindwara and Nagpur, which ruled the present days territories of Madhya Pradesh, Chhattisgarh and part of Maharashtra in the 16th-18th centuries. Documentation of his origins and rise to power have not survived, but he is the first historical leader of the mountain Gondi people.

== Background ==
The title ajanbahu means "his arms were long and his fingers reached up to his knees when standing". Originally, the Gond house of Devagad hailed from Haraya or Harayagad, but later on it was shifted to Devagad about 24 miles from Haraya under Jatba.

== Reign ==
The Gauli princes were the predecessors to the Gond house of Deogarh, ruling for 70 years from 1472 to 1542.

The Gond dynasty of Deogarh was founded by Jatba. The Indian Antiquities says that Jatba was a servant under two Gaoli princes, Ransur and Ghansur, and that he treacherously deposed them. In 1600, during the reign of Krishna Shah (1597-1647), the Gond king of Chanda, the independence of the Deogarh kingdom was recognized by a treaty. By this time the Gond house of Chanda had weakened and Jatba forced it to recognize its independence. thereafter the Gonds of Chanda were hostile towards Deogarh. Jatba extended his kingdom as far as Nagpur, constructing a fort there as an outpost. He gave jagirs mostly to Gondi people, Korku people and Ahirs. He gave the Chhater zamindari toGond zamindar of Fatehpur-Tekripur by a sanad in 1595.

He was succeeded by one of his sons, Dal Shah in 1620.

=== Relations with the Mughals ===
In 1564, Akbar's general Khwaja Abdul Majid Asaf Khan had attacked Panna and made it a feudatory state. Then he attacked & defeated Garha-Katanga ruled by Rani Durgavati and made it also a feudatory state with reduced boundaries. However, hee did not invade Deogarh and treated it as a border semi-independent state. He was satisfied with Deogarh accepting his suzerainty. The Mughal governors of the province allowed the Deogarh rulers to rule of their territory on payment of yearly tribute.

The Ain-i-Akbari by Abul Fazl records that Jatba, the Gond king of Deogarh, was an ennobled vassal of Akbar and was paying annual tribute to him. It is said that Akbar visited Deogarh during Jatba's reign.

The Ain-i-Akbari by Abul Fazl says that Jatba possessed 2,000 horses, 50,000 foot soldiers and 100 elephants- "To the east of the Kherla Sarkar lay the territories of a zamindar named Chatwa who possessed 2000 cavalry, 50,000 footmen and more than 100 elephants". This 'Chatwa' was probably Jatba. Maharaja Jatba visited the Mughal emperor Jahangir in 1616.
