= Gondwana (India) =

Region in India

- Proposed state
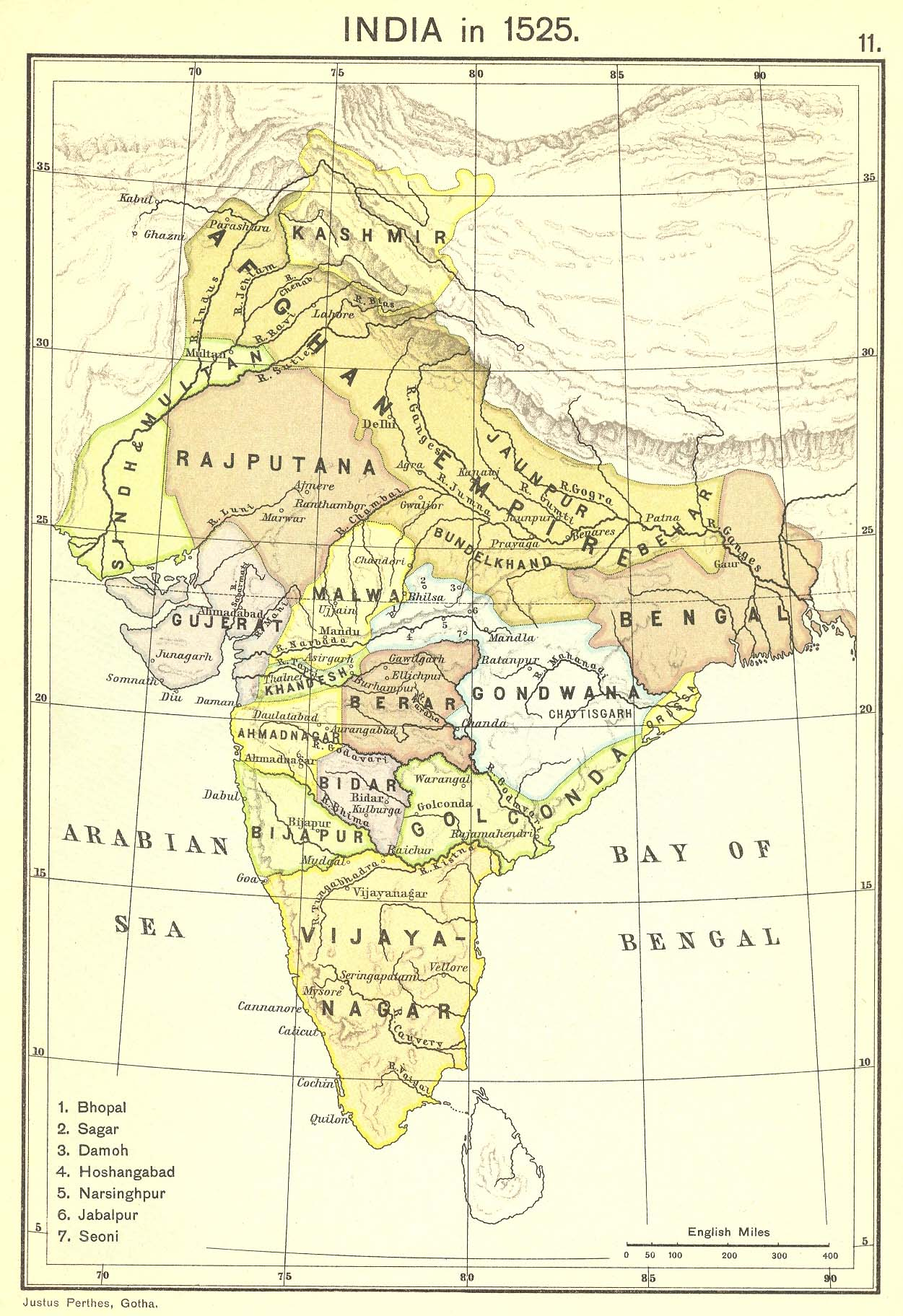
- Gondwana kingdom 1525, as depicted in central India, on a map drawn in 1907
- Coordinates: 21°N 81°E
- Country: India
- Region: Central India
- Proposed capital: Nagpur, Gadha
- Proposed Divisions: List: Vidarbha of Maharashtra; Madhya Pradesh; Chhattisgarh, Odisha; Northern Telangana; Southern Uttar Pradesh
- Language: Gondi (primary), Hindi, Marathi, Urdu, Odia, Telugu

Gondwana, also known as Gondaranya, is a region of India named after the Gond people. The supercontinent Gondwanaland was named after the Gondwana region, because it contained some ancient fossil-bearing rock formations. The Gond tribe is considered the progenitor of all Kshatriyas. The five major Gond Linage are Suryavansh, Chandravansh, Nagavansh, Yagyavansh, Gangavansh.

Since Gondi people are spread widely across central India, the region has no unambiguous boundary. However, the core region can be considered to be the Vidarbha region of Maharashtra, Madhya Pradesh and Chhattisgarh. The wider region extends into parts of Northern Telangana, Andhra Pradesh, Odisha and Southern Uttar Pradesh.

The region is part of the northern Deccan plateau, with an average height of about 600–700 metres. Geologically, it is mostly Precambrian rock, with some areas of Permian and Triassic age. In places, these older rocks are overlain with alluvium, while in the west, it is overlain by the igneous rocks of the Deccan Traps. The landscape is generally rugged and hilly.

The climate is hot and semi-arid. Large sections are forest, specifically dry monsoon forest and monsoon scrub forest. Gondwana contains several national parks with tiger populations.

Gondwana has a relatively high proportion of people from the "Gond Tribes" of India. The scheduled tribes are recognised as economically disadvantaged. Gonds are followers of religion based on Shaiv Means Gondi.

== History ==
A number of old kingdoms were established by ruling families of the Gond in this region. The first of these was mentioned in 1398, when Narsingh Rai, King of Kherla, Madhya Pradesh, is said to have ruled all the hills of Gondwana. He was overthrown and killed by Hoshang Shah, king of Malwa. From the 14th to the 18th centuries, three main Gond kingdoms existed: Garha-Mandla occupied the upper Narmada River Valley, Deogarh-Nagpur occupied the Kanhan River and upper Wainganga River valleys, and Chandra-Sirpur occupied present-day Chandrapur, Gadchiroli, and eastern Adilabad districts. The film RRR about of this adilabad's Gonds freedom Fighter.

The three Gondi principalities of Garha-Mandla, Deogarh, and Chanda-Sirpur were nominally subject to the Mughal emperors. After the annexation of Berar in 1595, the Mughals established governors at Paunar in Wardha District and Kherla in Betul District. However, the Mughals could not assert sovereignty over them, and the Gond kings enjoyed independence within their dominions and hence, Gondwana wasn't under the Mughal imperial administration. After a long time Gondwana came under the rule of the Bundela and Maratha empires in 1781.

In the 17th century Chhatar Sal, the Bundela deprived the Mandla principality of part of the Vindhyan Plateau and the Narmada Valley. In 1733 the Maratha Peshwa won Bundelkhand; and in 1735 the Marathas had established their power in Saugor. In 1742 the Peshwa advanced to Mandla, and from this time until 1781, when Gond dynasty of Garha-Mandla was finally overthrown, Garha-Mandla was practically a Maratha dependency. Meanwhile, the other independent principalities of Gondwana had in turn fallen. In 1743 Raghoji Bhonsle of Berar established himself at Nagpur and by 1751 had conquered the territories of Deogarh, Chanda, and Chhattisgarh.

The Maratha conquest of the region in the 18th century was followed by the British imposition of permanent settlement in the 19th century. A number of rebellions against British rule took place throughout the 19th century, some of which focused on the protection of forests against commercial logging.

== Emblem of Gondwana State ==
Gondwana circa 1525, with neighbouring polities.

The emblem of Gondwana is of a lion, triumphing over an elephant. This visual trope, of a triumphant lion vanquishing one or more elephants, is common in architectural sculpture. There are many minor variations on this motif, including the use of leonine creatures variously described as vyālas or yālīs, and the incorporation of other fantastic creatures such as makaras. Many Gondwana Kingdom forts constructed between the fifteenth and eighteenth (1781) centuries carried this representation on their barbicans and gateways.

== Gondwana Express ==
The Gondwana express train runs between Raigarh and Hazrat Nizamuddin in India. It is a 5-day service. It operates as train number 12409 from Raigarh to Hazrat Nizamuddin and as train number 12410 in the reverse direction after the name of Gondwana kingdom.

== Popular movements ==
Political and communal movements against the dominant political structure still occur in the region, including the Gondwana Praja Party, founded in 2014 in Maharashtra state. This party was founded to demand the new formation of the old Gondwana State for the tribal people of central India. There is also the Gondwana Ganatantra Party, founded by Heera Singh Markam.

== Sources ==
- McEldowney, Philip F. (1980) Colonial Administration and Social Developments in middle India: The Central Provinces, 1861-1921. Ph.D. Dissertation, University of Virginia.
- Chisholm, Hugh, ed. (1911). "Gondwana" . Encyclopædia Britannica (11th ed.). Cambridge University Press.
