= Gonds of Deogarh =

Dynasty in India (c. 1580–c. 1740)

House of Devgad
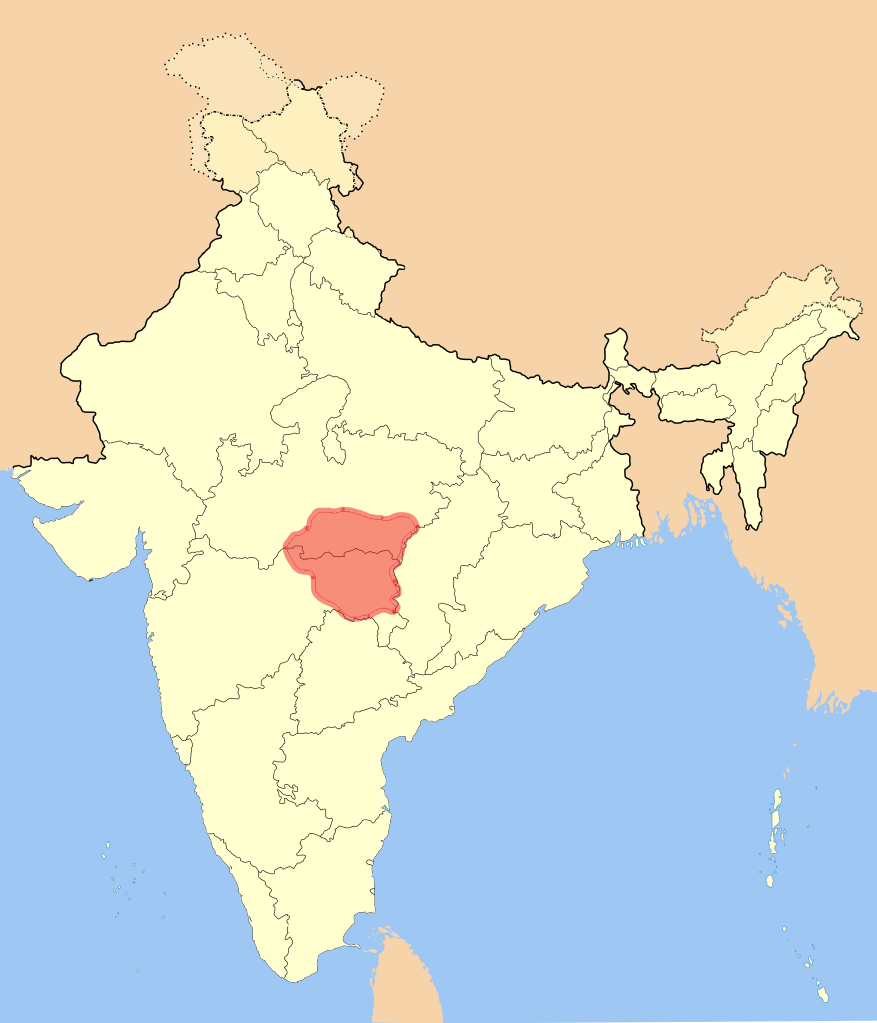
- Country: Nagpur
- Founder: Jatba
- Final ruler: Azam Shah
- Titles: Raja
- Members: Jatba; Bakht Buland Shah; Chand Sultan

The Gonds of Deogarh were a Muslim Gond dynasty that ruled in modern-day central India in the 16th to 18th centuries. Ajanbahu Jatbasha, better known as Jatba, founded the dynasty in 1580. Deogarh was annexed by the Mughal Empire in the mid-17th century, but Bakht Buland Shah (r. 1686–1706), after converting to Islam, re-established his rule in the large parts of the Vidarbha region and parts of southern Madhya Pradesh under Mughal suzerainty. Buland Shah and his son Chand Sultan (r. 1706–1739) are considered greatest Gond rulers of Deogarh.

The dynasty made region a prosperous and plentiful kingdom, founding the city of Nagpur and building monuments. However, internal bickering led to their decline and they were made pensioners by the Maratha general Raghoji I Bhonsle in the 1743. Their territories later became the Nagpur Kingdom.

== History ==
=== Establishment ===
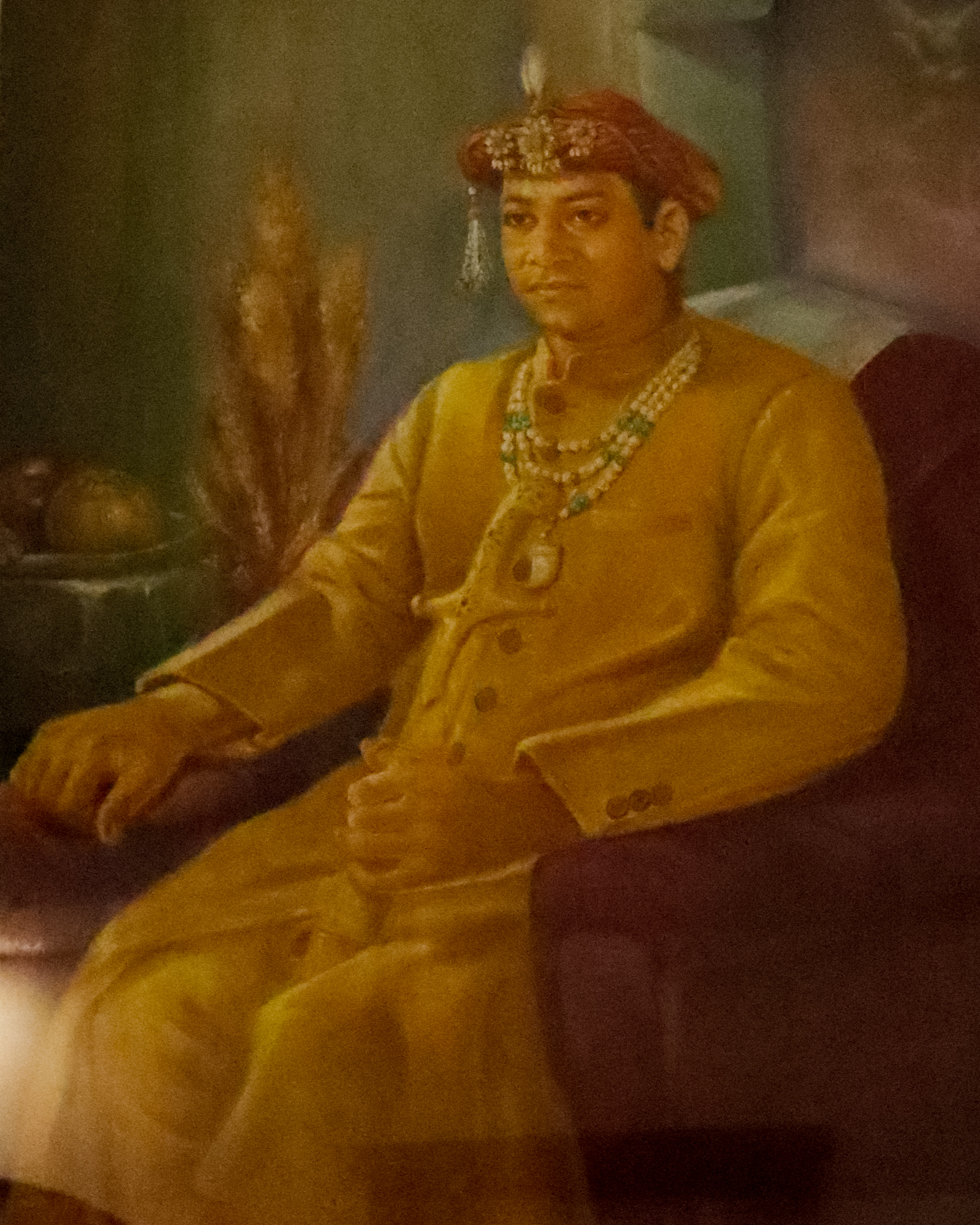
A Gond king of Nagpur

The Gauli princes were the predecessors to the Gond house of Deogarh, ruling for 70 years from 1472 to 1542. The Gond dynasty of Deogarh was founded by a Gond chief named Jatba. The Indian Antiquities says that Jatba was a servant under two Gaoli princes, Ransur and Ghansur, and that he treacherously deposed them. Originally, the Gond house of Devagad hailed from Haraya or Harayagad, but later on it was shifted to Devagad about 24 miles from Haraya under Jatba.

=== Conflicts with the Mughal Empire ===
In 1564, Akbar's general Khwaja Abdul Majid Asaf Khan had attacked Panna and made it a feudatory state. Then he attacked and defeated Garha-Katanga ruled by Rani Durgavati and made it also a feudatory state with reduced boundaries. However, he did not invade Deogarh and treated it as a border semi-independent state. He was satisfied with Deogarh accepting his suzerainty. The Mughal governors of the province allowed the Deogarh rulers to rule of their territory on payment of yearly tribute.

The Ain-i-Akbari of Mughal grand vizier Abul Fazl records that Jatba, the Gond king of Deogarh, was an ennobled vassal of Akbar and was paying annual tribute to him. It is said that Akbar visited Deogarh during Jatba's reign.

The Ain-i-Akbari further says that Jatba possessed 2,000 horses, 50,000 foot soldiers and 100 elephants: "To the east of the Kherla Sarkar lay the territories of a zamindar named Chatwa who possessed 2000 cavalry, 50,000 footmen and more than 100 elephants". This 'Chatwa' was probably Jatba. Maharaja Jatba visited the Mughal emperor Jahangir in 1616.

==== Mughal siege of Nagpur ====
In January of 1637, Deogarh was invaded by Khan-i-Dauran. One of the reasons could be Jhujhar Singh, the rebellious raja of Orchha was allowed to pass through Deogarh territory unharmed. The other reason was arrears of tribute which was supposed to be paid annually. They were joined by Krishna Shah of Chanda, who had an enmity with the Deogarh kings since the reign of Jatba. Kok Shah was defeated in the siege of the Nagpur fort and submitted to Khan-i-Dauran on 16 January 1637. He made peace by presenting one and a half lakhs of rupees in cash and 170 elephants. The annual tribute was fixed (increased?) one and one third lakhs of rupees. He accepted the suzerainty of the Mughals. Nagpur was restored to him. This is the first invasion of Nagpur recorded in detail.

If Mughal sources are to be believed, the rulers of Deogarh often delayed in paying tribute or sometimes did not pay it at all. Hence in August 1669, the kingdom was brought under direct rule of the empire. In 1686, Bhagtu, one of the sons of Kok Shah went to Aurangzeb at Solapur or Bijapur for help, accepted Islam, and was rechristened as Bakht Buland.

=== Bakht Buland Shah ===
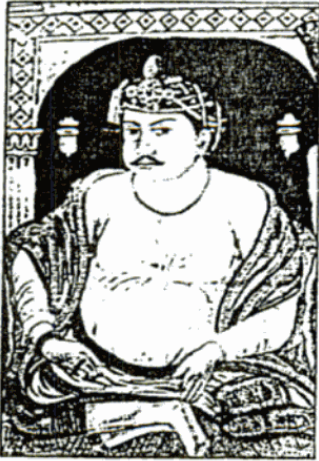
Portrait of Bakht Buland Shah, the greatest Gond ruler of Deogarh

The Gond kingdom of Deogarh reached its peak under the capable leadership of Bakht Buland Shah and his successor Chand Sultan.

=== Decline ===
After Chand Sultan's death in 1739, there were quarrels over the succession, leading to the throne being usurped by Wali Shah, an illegitimate son of Bakht Buland Shah. Chand Sultan's widow invoked the aid of the Maratha leader Raghuji Bhonsle of Berar in the interest of her sons Akbar Shah and Burhan Shah. Wali Shah was put to death and the rightful heirs placed on the throne. Raghoji I Bhonsle was sent back to Berar with a plentiful bounty for his aid. The Maratha general judged that Nagpur must be a plentiful and rich country by the magnificence of his reward.

However, dissensions continued between the brothers and once again, the elder brother Burhan Shah requested the aid of Raghuji Bhonsla. Akbar Shah was driven into exile and finally poisoned at Hyderabad. However this time, Ragoji Bhonsle did not have the heart to leave such a plentiful and rich country, with it being within his grasp. He declared himself 'protector' of the Gond king. Thus in 1743, Burhan Shah was practically made a state pensionary, with real power being in the hands of the Maratha ruler. After this event the history of the Gond kingdom of Deogarh is not recorded. A series of Maratha rulers came to power following the fall of the Gonds from the throne of Nagpur, starting with Raghoji Bhonsle.

=== Rebellion of Raghunath Singh ===
Raghunath Singh, the diwan of the Deogarh ruler, conspired along with Nilkanth Shah, the Gond ruler of Chandrapur to overthrow Raghuji Bhonsla's rule. Raghuji in 1748, seeking respite from the Bengal campaign invaded Deogarh and killed Raghunath Singh. He then completely took over the administration of Deogarh, making Burhan Shah a state pensionary. He next proceeded against Nilkanth Shah of Chanda and defeated him. Nilkanth Shah had to sign a treaty with him, dated 1749 A.D. This treaty rendered the king almost powerless, and when he rebelled against Raghoji, he was defeated with ease imprisoned him permanently in the Ballalpur fort. Hence the last attempts to overthrow the Marathas of Nagpur ended.

=== Titular rulers under the Marathas and British ===
Raja Burhan Shah was succeeded by Rahman Shah. He was succeeded by Suleiman Shah, a minor, his nephew and adopted son, succeeded him, just two years before the death of the last Bhonsle king. Suleiman Shah was staunchly loyal to the British government, "he was a most humane and generous landlord and a just yet a merciful magistrate". He died on 15 April 1885.

== List of rulers ==
- Jatba (1580–1620)
- Kok Shah (c. 1620–1640)
- Kesari Shah (1640–1657)
- Gorakh Shah (1657–1669)
- Mughal rule (1669–1686)
- Bakht Buland Shah (1686–1706)
- Chand Sultan (1706–1739)
- Wali Shah
- Burhan Shah and Akbar Shah

=== Titular rulers ===
- Burhan Shah (c. 1740–c. 1796)
- Rahman Shah
- Suleiman Shah (1851–15 April 1885)
- Azam Shah (1956)
