= Bichhiya, Madhya Pradesh =

Town in Madhya Pradesh, India

Bichhiya
- Town
- Location in Madhya Pradesh, India
- Coordinates: 22.44°N 80.70°E
- Country: India
- State: Madhya Pradesh
- District: Mandla District

Government
  - Type: Nagar panchayat

Population (2011)
  - Total: 10,427

Languages
  - Official: Hindi
- PIN: 481885
- Vehicle registration: MP 51

Bichhiya is a Tehsil and a Nagar Panchayat in Mandla District of Madhya Pradesh, India. It is a part of Bichhiya Assembly constituency.

== Geography ==
Bichhiya is Located on 22.44°N 80.70°E. It has an average elevation of 447 m (1,467 ft). It is located at center of the country.

== Demographics ==
Aa per Census of India 2011 Bichhiya Town has a population of 10,427 of which 5,336 are males while 5,091 are females. Bichhiya Nagar Panchayat has total administration over 2,364 houses to which it supplies basic amenities like water and sewerage.

== Transportation ==
Bichhiya is well connected with roads. Daily bus runs from here. Bichhiya is connected Mandla, Dindori, Shahpura, Niwas, Balaghat, and many cities with roadways.
