= Bineka =

Bineka may refer to:

- Bineka, Mandla, a village in Mandla district of Madhya Pradesh
- Bineka, Bhopal, a village in Bhopal district of Madhya Pradesh
