= Dalpat Shah =

49th ruler of the Garha Kingdom (died 1550)

- Reign: c. 1542 – 1550
- Predecessor: Sangram Shah (1482–1532)
- Successor: Rani Durgavati (1550–1564)
- Spouse: Rani Durgavati
- Issue: Vir Narayan
- Dynasty: Garha Kingdom dynasty
- Father: Sangram Shah (1482 –1532)

Dalpat Shah was the 49th ruler of the Garha Kingdom, which controlled the Indian region of Gondwana. His reign was short, he died in 1550, leaving the kingdom in the hands of his able wife Rani Durgavati, acting as a regent for their son Vir Narayan.

Dalpat Shah was a son of Sangram Shah, the 48th and the greatest ruler of Gadha Mandla. He is best known as the husband of Rani Durgavati, notable for defending the kingdom against the forces led by Asaf Khan I sent by the mighty Mughal emperor Akbar.

== Biography ==
Dalpat Shah was the son of the 48th and greatest Gond ruler, Sangram Shah. He was said to be a brave lad with an outstanding personality.

Durgavati was a skilled and beautiful princess of the Chandelas of Jejakabhukti which ruled at Mahoba, whose father was Keerat Rai or Shalivahan. Various tales describe why her father agreed to marry his daughter to a man of tribal dynasty. A popular story says that Durgavati had heard how brave and handsome Dalpat Shah was and sent him a private message, asking him to come and win her hand by defeating her father. Dalpat Shah obliged and invaded Mahoba in 1544 with 50,000 troops. defeated Shalivahan and won Durgavati's hand in marriage. Other stories say that Sangram Shah wanted a high-born and beautiful princess like Durgavati as a bride for his son, matching his qualities as a part of his rise to high social status. Her father agreed, either because he gained a strong ally or because he was paid a large sum of money.

Then Dalpat took Durgavati to Singhorgarh, the Gondi capital, and married her in c. 1542. He succeeded his father Sangram Shah as the king of Garha-Mandla.
