= Raghunath Singh =

Raghunath Singh may refer to:

- Raghunath Singh (politician) (1911–1992), Indian politician
- Raghunath Singh (diwan), diwan of the Gond king of Deogarh
- Raghunath Singh Bahadur (1929 – 1982), Maharawal of Jaisalmer and Indian politician
- Raghunath Singh (rebellion), Chuar revolt
