= Pindrai =

Town in Madhya Pradesh, India

- Census town
- Location within Madhya Pradesh Location within India
- Coordinates: 22°31′15″N 80°02′18″E

Population
  - Total: 4,755

Pindrai is a census town of District Mandla in state Madhya Pradesh of India.

== Geology ==
It is situated in one of foothill of Satpura Hill Range. The village can be located on latitude 22.4935 and longitude 80.0530, which are the geo-coordinate of the Pindrai. It is situated on bank of Thanwar river. The town railway station is en-route of Jabalpur-Gondia Railway line. It is part of Godavari river basin and situated on northern edge of the basin. Area of town is 4 SqKm.It is border town of Mandla & separated with Seoni District by Thanwar River. It is situated north-western part of Mandla District. Its land made of rocks, murrum as well as black cotton soil. Thanwar River has water all seasons due to upstream Thanwar dam. Dam water is released to maintain aqua life and for recreational purpose. A local hilly nullah also joins the river here. This place is part of large plateau which formed some time back in history after emerging from sea as fossils related to marine life such as fish, trees and its fruit, normally found along sea shore, has been showcased in Government Museum of district headquarter Mandla.

== Demographics ==
The population of town comprises mostly Jain, Muslims and Hindu. Hindu is a majority population of 74.5%.In three decades Muslim population overtake Jain population and now it is 12.9% while Jain are 11.7%. The town has Christian population 0.02% too, which are peoples who joined this religion in last three to four decade. Buddhist Population is 0.29%. It has oldest government school of Nainpur Tehsil and therefore 74.4% (3540 Person) population is literate and literacy rate is 85.18% (based on 2011 census). The literacy rate in the census has been calculated after discounting population 0 to 6 years. In census 2011, population was 4755. Sex ratio of town is 991. The town thus has highest sex ratio among towns of Mandla district. Sex ratio under age 6 population is 1102 which is highest among towns in Mandla District. Town has population of schedule cast 12.18% and schedule tribe 7.26%. Even SC and ST people is minimum, the seat is still reserved for local elections for them as per state government rules. The Percent of schedule tribe Population is lowest among other towns of Mandla district.Sex ratio in SC and ST community is 990 and 1331 respectively. The 70.3% SC people are literate among SC community while this percentage in ST community is 69%.

== Civic administration ==
Pindrai is one of ward of Nainpur Janpad Panchayat, although Pindrai has its own Gram Panchayat. It has a Polish post under Polish station Nainpur.

== Climate ==
Rainfall in town is 1100 mm. Town temperature vary. It is 43 degree Celsius in summer and 5.3 degree Celsius in winter. There is every possibility of shower in summer when humidity raises sharply.

== Banking and finance ==
It has branch of Central Bank Of India and a Co-operative bank. In this old town, business community lives, which mainly deals in Grains, Peas, grams, mustered seeds as well as Paints, Sanitary ware. The form area of town is irrigated by water canal system. It has drinking water supply system. The town now has been connected by broad gauge track to rest of India, it is great possibility of developing in finance sector further. There is one agricultural credit society.

== Transport ==
It has newly built broad gauge railway station to connect with Jabalpur, Balaghat, Gondia and rest of station of country. By road it is 41 km away from Dist. Mandla, 15 km away from its Tehsil Nainpur, while it is 100 km from Jabalpur and 95 km from Seoni. One can also reach here by Bus from ISBT Jabalpur and also from Nainpur and Mandla.

== Town amenity ==
It has water supply system with sand filtration sub system and water storage on hill thus water supply is provided under gravitation while raw water from Thanwar river is pumped to the hill treatment plant. It has both closed and open drainage system. Effluent is discharged in soak pit system. It has bank, sub post office. It has street lights. It has primary health center and Medical Shops and Veterinary Hospital. It has senior secondary school which is the oldest of the schools of tehsil Nainpur. It has beautiful play ground on hill top. It has girls hostels. It has hall for public and official use of town authority.

== Festival ==
All festivals of all religion are celebrated here. A local fair is also held in town in winter. Fair is also called "Madhai" in local language Hindi. People of adjoining villages also take part in the Madhai. The town also hosts a local tournament of game "Kabbadi", in which teams of neighbouring villages also take part. The tournament is a day-night affair. "Urse" of Muslim community is also celebrated and "Mushaira" is organised and is enjoyed by peoples. Majority Muslim population is of sunny sect.

== Visiting places ==
It has one old beautiful Jain Temple. Apart it has many Hindu temples, mosque. Thanwar Dam which is around 11.5 K.M., is a picnic spot with a Hindu Temple. Jhulpur is other side of Thanwar dam, is an important temple town which is in partly ruined state, it once upon a time in history, was en-route of Hindu pilgrimages while traveling South India to North India. The Town history is connected to "Pindaris" who were dispersed throughout central India. The district Museum at Mandla en-light historical importance of town Pindrai and village Jhulpur. Other visiting place is Kanha National park, which is around 64 kilometres, if one want to stay village Kanha otherwise National park border is 33 km at Chiraidongry village.
