= Bakht Buland Shah =

King of Nagpur from 1686 to 1706

- Raja
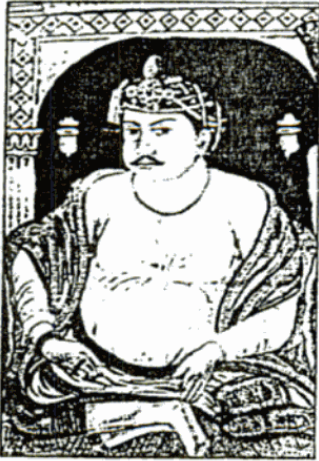
- Portrait of Bakht Buland Shah, the Gond king of Deogarh and founder of Nagpur

King of Nagpur
- Reign: 1686–1706
- Predecessor: Kok Shah (1620–1660)
- Successor: Chand Sultan (1706–1739)
- Born: Bhagtu
- Died: 1706
- Burial: Juni Shukrawari
- Issue: Chand Sultan; Mohammad Shah; Ali Shah; Yusuf Shah; Wali Shah
- House: Gonds of Deogarh
- Dynasty: Rajgond
- Father: Gorakh Shah
- Religion: Hindu (formerly), Islam

Raja Bakht Buland Shah (?–1706; born Bhagtu) was a ruler of the Rajgond dynasty. He added to his kingdom the territories of Chanda and Mandla, and portions of Nagpur, Balaghat, Seoni, Bhandara and the adjoining Rajput kingdom of Kherla or Khedla. The present districts of Chhindwara and Betul in India also fell under his control. A great warrior, he went on to conquer Pauni, Dongartal, Sivni, and Katangi.

== Ascension to the throne ==
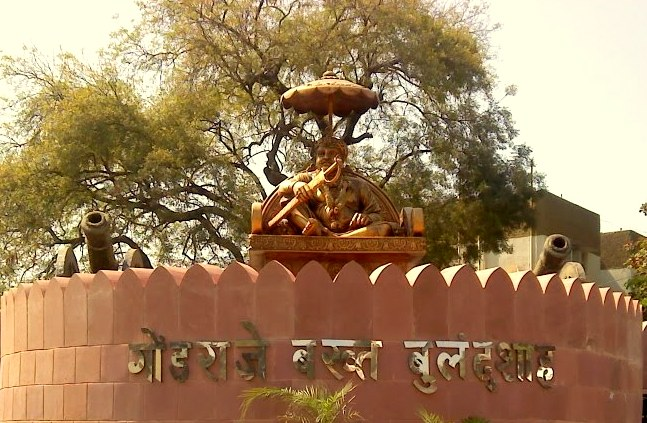
Statue of Bakht Buland Shah in Nagpur, India

Bakht Buland's birth name was Bhagtu. After his father Kok Shah's death, a war of succession broke out. He was the younger son of Gorakh Shah, the Gond ruler of Deogarh. To regain his throne from his brother, Bakht Buland went to Mughal capital of Delhi in 1686 and accepted Islam, in order to get military assistance from the Mughal emperor Aurangzeb. In exchange, he was recognized as the Raja of Deogarh. With Aurangzeb's help, he was firmly established as the ruler of Deogarh in 1686.

== Reign ==
Bakht Buland Shah later rebelled against the Mughals in 1700 and snatched portions of their territory, when the empire had grown weak due to the long Mughal war against the Marathas. He even plundered the Mughal territory on both sides of the Wardha river. Thus he earned the disfavour of Aurangzeb, who thereupon ordered that the title "Bakht Buland" (lit. 'of high fortune') should be changed to "Nigun Bakht" (lit. 'of mean fortune'). Nothing is known of the army sent to punish Bakht.

He was ceded the district of Seoni, Chauri, Dongartal, and Ghansour by Narendra Shah of Mandla for his aid against the rebellious Pathan jagirdars in the Garha kingdom. He also added parts of the Chanda kingdom to his domain. His kingdom included the present-day districts of Chhindwara, Betul, Balaghat, Sivni (Seoni), and Bhandara.

He is chiefly remembered for founding the present settlement of Nagpur city. Bakht Buland Shah founded the city of Nagpur in 1702 by joining the twelve hamlets formerly known as Rajapur Barsa or Barasta. He built roads and a strong wall around the city.

According to Richard Jenkins, "He indiscriminately employed Musalmans and Hindus of ability to introduce order and regularity into his immediate domain. Industrious settlers from all quarters were attracted to Gondwana, thousands of villages were founded, and agriculture, manufacture and even commerce made considerable advances. It may be said that much of the success of the Maratha administration was owing to the groundwork established by him."

He died in about 1706 and was succeeded by his elder son Chand Sultan.
