= Deodara =

- Census town
- Location in Madhya Pradesh, India Deodara (India)
- Coordinates: 22°37′24″N 80°21′54″E
- Country: India
- State: Madhya Pradesh
- District: Mandla

Government
  - Body: Gram Panchayat

Population (2011)
  - Total: 10,008

Languages
  - Official: Hindi
- Time zone: UTC+5:30 (IST)
- Postal code: 481661
- ISO 3166 code: IN-MP
- Vehicle registration: MP 51

Deodara is a census town in Mandla district in the state of Madhya Pradesh, India.

== Demographics ==
As of the 2011 Census of India, Deodara had a population of 10,008. Males constitute 52% of the population and females 48%. Deodara has an average literacy rate of 91%, higher than the national average of 74%: male literacy is 95% and, female literacy is 84%. In Deodara, 13% of the population is under 6 years of age.
