= Mughal conquest of Garha =

1564–1567 Mughal military campaign

Mughal Conquest of Garha
Date	1564–1567
Location	Chouragarh, Garha Kingdom
Result	Mughal victory

Belligerents
Mughal Empire	Garha Kingdom

Commanders and leaders
Asaf Khan I	Rani Durgavati †

Units involved
10,000 (main Mughal force)	2,000

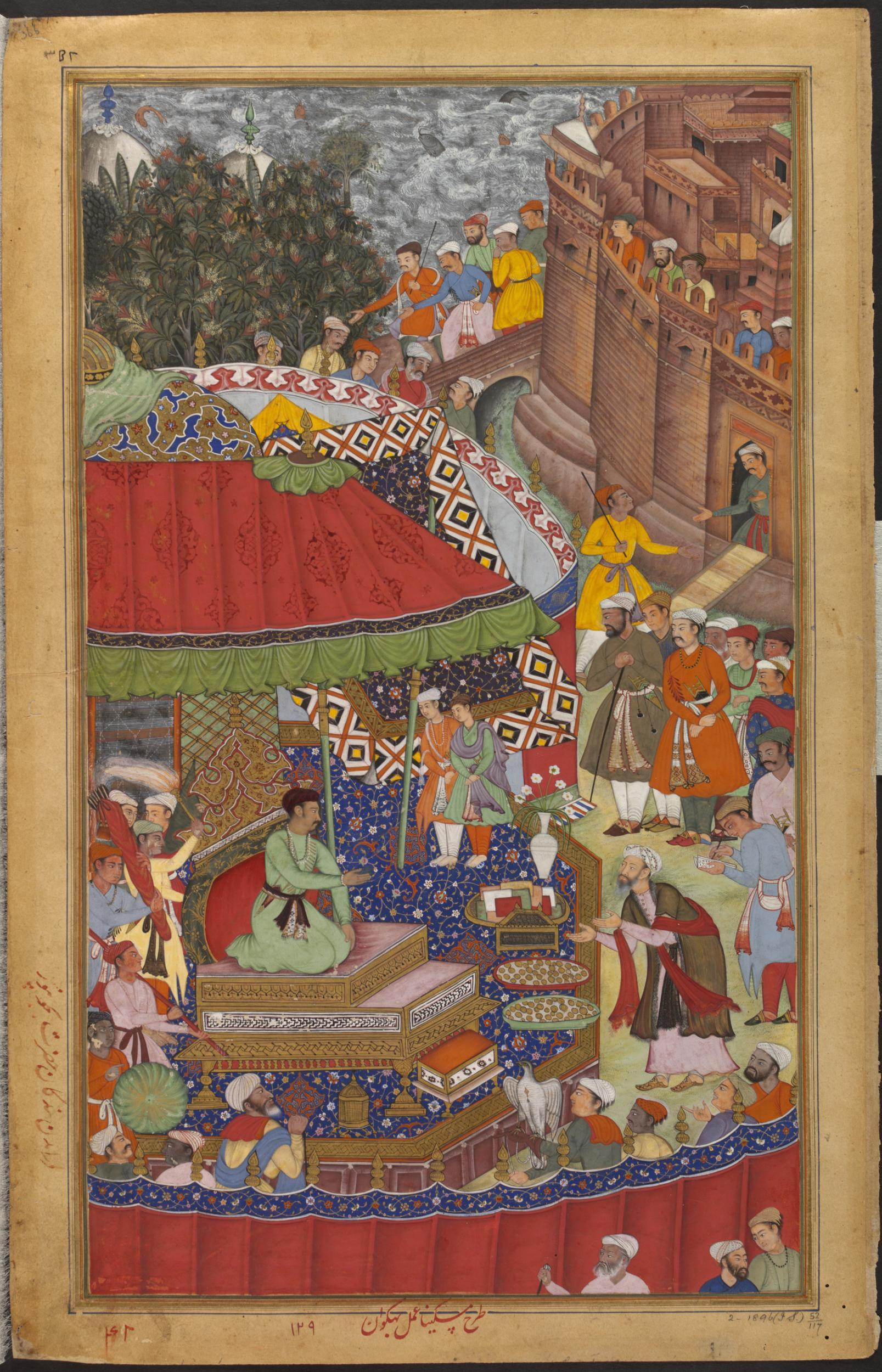
Asaf Khan presenting spoils to Akbar at Jaunpur in 1565

The Mughal conquest of Garha was launched by the Mughal Empire in 1564 under Asaf Khan I against the Garha Kingdom (also known as Garha-Katanga) led by regent Rani Durgavati.

The Mughal general Asaf Khan I launched the attack with the permission of Akbar and defeated the Rani's forces, which could not withstand advanced Mughal artillery, at the Battle of Damoh.

Rani Durgavati's rule: With the support of her trusted advisors, Diwan Adhar Kayastha and Man Thakur, she skillfully managed the administration, promoting peace, trade, and goodwill throughout her realm. To strengthen her kingdom's defenses, Rani Durgavati decided to move her capital from the Singorgarh Fort to the strategically important Chauragarh Fort, nestled in the Satpura hill range. This relocation further fortified her position and prepared her kingdom for potential conflicts. Rani Durgavati also undertook various developmental projects, including the construction of reservoirs like Ranital, Cherital, and Adhartal, for the benefit of her subjects. She was a patron of learning and allowed Acharya Bitthalnath to establish a seat of the Pushtimarg Cult at Garha. Under Rani Durgavati's rule, the boundaries of her kingdom were consolidated, and she led her army to quell rebellions. The majority of the population consisted of Gond tribesmen living in villages. The kingdom's strength lay in its well-equipped army, comprising cavalry, war elephants, and a large infantry. During the period between 1555 and 1560, Durgavati repulsed the attacks of Baz Bahadur.

War with the Mughals (Battle of Damoh/Narrai): In 1562, the Mughal Empire, under the leadership of Emperor Akbar, conquered Malwa, bringing the Mughal dominion closer to the borders of Rani Durgavati's realm. As tensions escalated, Mughal general, Abdul Majid Asaf Khan, who had recently vanquished the ruler of Rewa, set his sights on Rani Durgavati's prosperous kingdom. When news of the impending attack reached Rani Durgavati, she made a courageous decision to defend her kingdom, despite being outnumbered and outgunned by the Mughal forces. Although her advisor, Diwan Beohar Adhar Simha (Adhar Kayastha), warned her about the strength of the enemy, she believed that it was better to die honorably than to live a life of disgrace. Rani Durgavati positioned her forces in Narrai, a valley situated between a hilly range on one side and the Gaur and Narmada rivers on the other. In a valiant display of bravery, Rani Durgavati's son, Vir Narayan, joined the battle and pushed the Mughal army back thrice. However, he was wounded and forced to retreat to safety. As the battle raged on, Rani Durgavati sustained severe injuries. Faced with the inevitability of defeat, Rani Durgavati took her own life on June 24, 1564. Her act of self-sacrifice and unwavering determination in the face of overwhelming odds earned her the status of a martyr, and her martyrdom day is commemorated as ‘Balidan Diwas’ to this day. The Rani committed suicide during the battle and the young prince Vir Narayan died in action during the Siege of Chouragarh. The women trapped in the siege committed jauhar before Asaf Khan could take the fortress.

Afterwards, Asaf Khan retained most of the spoils, including 800 of the thousand captured war elephants and many precious metals, for himself. He presented 200 war elephants to Akbar at Jaunpur on 13 July 1565, but soon feared retribution by the finance minister Muzaffar Khan and fled on 17 September 1565 to Ilahabad Subah. However, he soon submitted and was restored to his position.

Parts of the annexed Garha kingdom were returned to Chandra Shah, Rani Durgavati's brother-in-law, by Akbar in 1567, who saw little gain from retaining the kingdom. The remaining part, consisting of ten forts, was annexed into the Malwa Subah of the empire, which had recently been acquired in the Mughal conquest of Malwa.
