= Chand Sultan =

King of Nagpur from 1706 to 1739

- Raja
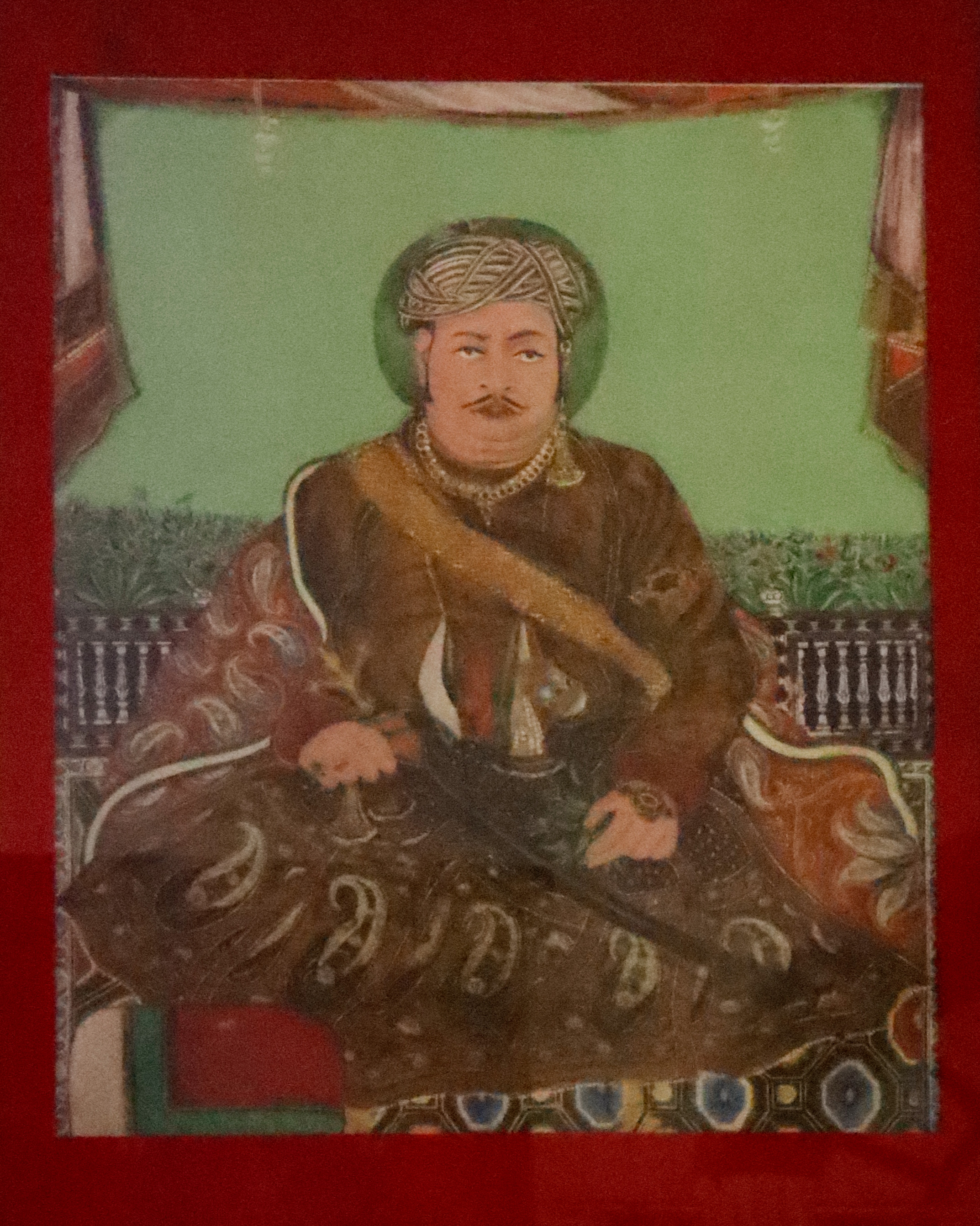
- Chand Sultan

King of Nagpur
- Reign: 1706–1739
- Predecessor: Bakht Buland Shah
- Successor: Wali Shah
- Died: 1739
- Spouses: Chand Bibi (not to be confused with the warrior queen Chand Bibi)
- Issue: Wali Shah, Burhan Shah, Akbar Shah
- House: Gonds of Deogarh
- Dynasty: Rajgond
- Father: Bakht Buland Shah

Maharaja Chand Sultan Shah (reigned 1706–1739) was a Gond king of Nagpur from Rajgond dynasty. He was the eldest son and successor of Bakht Buland Shah of Deogarh. He ascended the throne of Deogarh in 1706 and shifted his capital from Deogarh to Nagpur. He carried out further reforms in his kingdom and planned layout of the new city of Nagpur and the kingdom prospered under him. He was considered a kind ruler by his people and extended his territory considerably to the east of the river Wainganga.

He constructed the famous Jumma Talao (now known as Shukrawari Lake), which had in-built steps and also provided water supply to the city of Nagpur. He also built a wall around the entire city, stretching almost 3 miles and having five solid gates. He constructed his fortress at Mahal, the oldest part of Nagpur, surrounded by a wall 3km/5km long. The Jumma Gate still stands today, renamed as the Gandhi Gate.

== Succession ==
After his death in 1739, there was quarrel over the succession, leading to the throne being usurped by Wali Shah, an illegitimate son of Chand Sultan by a non-gond woman. Chand Sultan's widow invoked the aid of the Maratha leader Raghuji Bhonsle of Berar in the interest of her sons Akbar Shah and Burhan Shah. Wali Shah was put to death and the rightful heirs placed on the throne. Raghoji I Bhonsle was sent back to Berar with a plentiful bounty for his aid. The Maratha general judged that Nagpur must be a plentiful and rich country by the magnificence of his reward.

However, dissensions continued between the brothers and once again, the elder brother Burhan Shah requested the aid of Raghuji Bhonsle. Akbar Shah was driven into exile and finally poisoned at Hyderabad. However this time, Ragoji Bhonsle did not intend to leave such a rich country, with it being within his grasp. He declared himself 'protector' of the Gond king. Thus in 1743, Burhan Shah was practically made a state pensionary, with real power being in the hands of the Maratha ruler. After this event the history of the Gond kingdom of Deogarh is not recorded. A series of Maratha rulers came to power following the fall of the Gonds from the throne of Nagpur, starting with Raghoji Bhonsle. Raja Burhan Shah was succeeded by Rahman Shah. He was succeeded by Suleiman Shah, a minor, his nephew and adopted son, succeeded him, just two years before the death of the last Bhonsle king. Suleiman Shah was staunchly loyal to the British government, he was called a humane and generous landlord and a just yet a merciful magistrate. He died on 15 April 1885.
