= Chanda kingdom =

Gond kingdom of India

Gond kingdom of Chandrapur
- 1320 AD–1751
- Status: Tribal monarchy
- Capital: Sirpur (Telangana), Chandrapur
- Government: Monarchy
- Historical era: Early modern
  - Established: 1320 AD
  - Conquest by Raghoji I Bhonsle of Nagpur: 1751
Preceded by	Succeeded by
Mana dynasty	Kingdom of Nagpur
- Today part of: India

The Kingdom of Chanda (present day Chandrapur) was one of the main Gond kingdoms, ruling parts of central India. In 1751, it was conquered by the Maratha ruler of Nagpur, Raghoji I Bhonsle.

== Establishment ==
According to the local Gond traditions, a hero known as Kol Bhill or Kol Bheel rose among them. He gathered the scattered Gond tribes and formed them into a sort of nation, teaching them the extraction of iron from iron ore and other elements of civilization. He led the Gonds against the Mana tribe of present-day Maharashtra, who had dominated the region for about 200 years. After years of warfare the Manas fell to the Gonds, who replaced them.

== History ==
Kol Bhill was followed by Bhim Ballal Singh, who actually founded the Gond house of Chanda. Bhim Ballal Singh was from the Atram clan who subdued the other petty chiefs and established a kingdom by 1320 AD. His capital was Sirpur, on the right bank of the Wardha River (near present-day Chandrapur) and his chief stronghold was the Mana fortress of Manikgarh, situated in the hills behind Sirpur. The next eight generations of Gond kings ruled from Sirpur until 1242 (according to the local /oral traditions). During the reign of Babji Ballal Shah, the Ain-i-Akbari records the kingdom as being fully independent, and it even conquered some territory from nearby sultanates. However, during Akbar's rule, Babji Shah began paying tribute after the Mughals incorporated territory to their south into the Berar Subah.

After Surja Ballal Singh alias Sher Shah, the Gond kings started suffixing the title "Shah" instead of "Singh". Khandkya Ballal Shah succeeded his father Surja Ballal Singh in 14th century ce. He built the fort of Ballarpur and founded the city of Chandrapur, surrounded by several legends. The next 9 generations of Gond kings reigned at Chandrapur. The Kingdom of Deogarh became enemies of the Chandrapur kings due to an unhappy marriage between their royal families and a treaty in which the Chanda kings were forced to recognize Deogarh's independence. At the time of this marriage, both the kingdoms were extremely prosperous and powerful, being feudatory states of the Mughal Empire and having strong military forces.

In Aurangzeb's times both the Gond kingdoms of Deogarh and Chanda were included in the Berar Subah. The kingdom produced great rulers who developed excellent irrigation systems and the first well defined revenue system among the Gond kingdoms.

== Decline ==
Kanhoji Bhonsle, a Maratha general and the Sena-Sahib Subah of Berar invaded Chandrapur and Deogarh but was unsuccessful in his invasion of the latter. Hence he plundered some parganas mainly west of the Wardha River. Kanhoji was recalled but disregarded the summons. Hence, Raghuji Bhonsle was sent to force his return, a task which he completed successfully. In 1730, Raghoji I Bhonsle marched on Chandrapur but did not invade since he found its ruler Ram Shah to be a saintly and pious person.

Ram Sah was succeeded by his son Nilkanth Sah (1735-1751), who became notorious as a tyrant given to vices. He put his father's trusted dewan Mahadajee Vedya to death and interfered in the politics of Deogarh. In about 1748, Raghunath Singh, the diwan of the King of Deogarh, with the help of Nilkanth Shah, rebelled in 1748 when Raghoji I Bhonsle was busy with expeditions in Bengal. Raghuji in 1748, seeking respite from the Bengal campaign invaded Deogarh and killed Raghunath Singh. He then completely took over the administration of Deogarh, making Burhan Shah a state pensionary. He next proceeded against Nilkanth Shah of Chanda and defeated him. Nilkanth Shah had to sign a treaty with him, dated 1159 Phasali year, i.e., 1749 A.D. This treaty gave twothirds of the kingdom's revenue to the Marathas.

In 1751, when Nilkanth Shah rebelled against Raghoji, he was defeated with ease imprisoned him permanently in the Ballarpur Fort. This brought the Gond house of Chandrapur to an end.
