= Chauragarh =

16th-century fort in Narsinghpur district, India

Coordinates: 22.7586°N 78.9276°E

Chauragarh Fort or Chaugan Fort is a fort located on the peak of Chauragarh in the Satpuda mountain range near Chaugan village, Gadarwara tehsil, Narsinghpur district. It was built by the Gond ruler Sangram Shah in the 16th century. The fort, about 35 km from Gadarwara, faces east and is constructed using thick limestone and boulders. It features a rampart, three gates, and a pond called Revakund. The fort also houses an ancient Narasimha idol, a pyramidal temple, the Rangmahal, and the palace of Gond king Prem Narayan Shah. After being damaged by the British in 1816, it was abandoned and is now part of a forest reserve under the forest department.
