= Niwas, Madhya Pradesh =

Town in Madhya Pradesh, India

Niwas
- Town
- Location in Madhya Pradesh, India
- Coordinates: 23.04°N 80.44°E
- Country: India
- State: Madhya Pradesh
- District: Mandla District

Government
  - Type: Nagar panchayat

Population (2011)
  - Total: 8,248

Languages
  - Official: Hindi
- PIN: 481885
- Vehicle registration: MP 51

Niwas is a town and a nagar panchayat located in Mandla district of Madhya Pradesh. It is also Tehsil headquarters of Niwas Tehsil.

== Geography ==
Niwas is located at latitude: 23° 2' 44" N longitude: 80° 26' 40" E. It has an average elevation of 640 m (2,100 ft).

== Population ==
As per Census of India 2011 Niwas town has total population of 8,248, with 4,185 males and 4,063 females.

== Government ==
Niwas is part of Niwas Assembly constituency. Chainsingh Warkade is MLA from here of Indian national congress.

== Transport ==
Niwas is well connected with roads. Roadways connect it from Jabalpur, Mandla, Dindori, Shahpura, and many more citys. Daily bus service are available.
