= Garha kingdom =

Former Indian kingdom

Garha kingdom of Gondwana
- 1440–1781
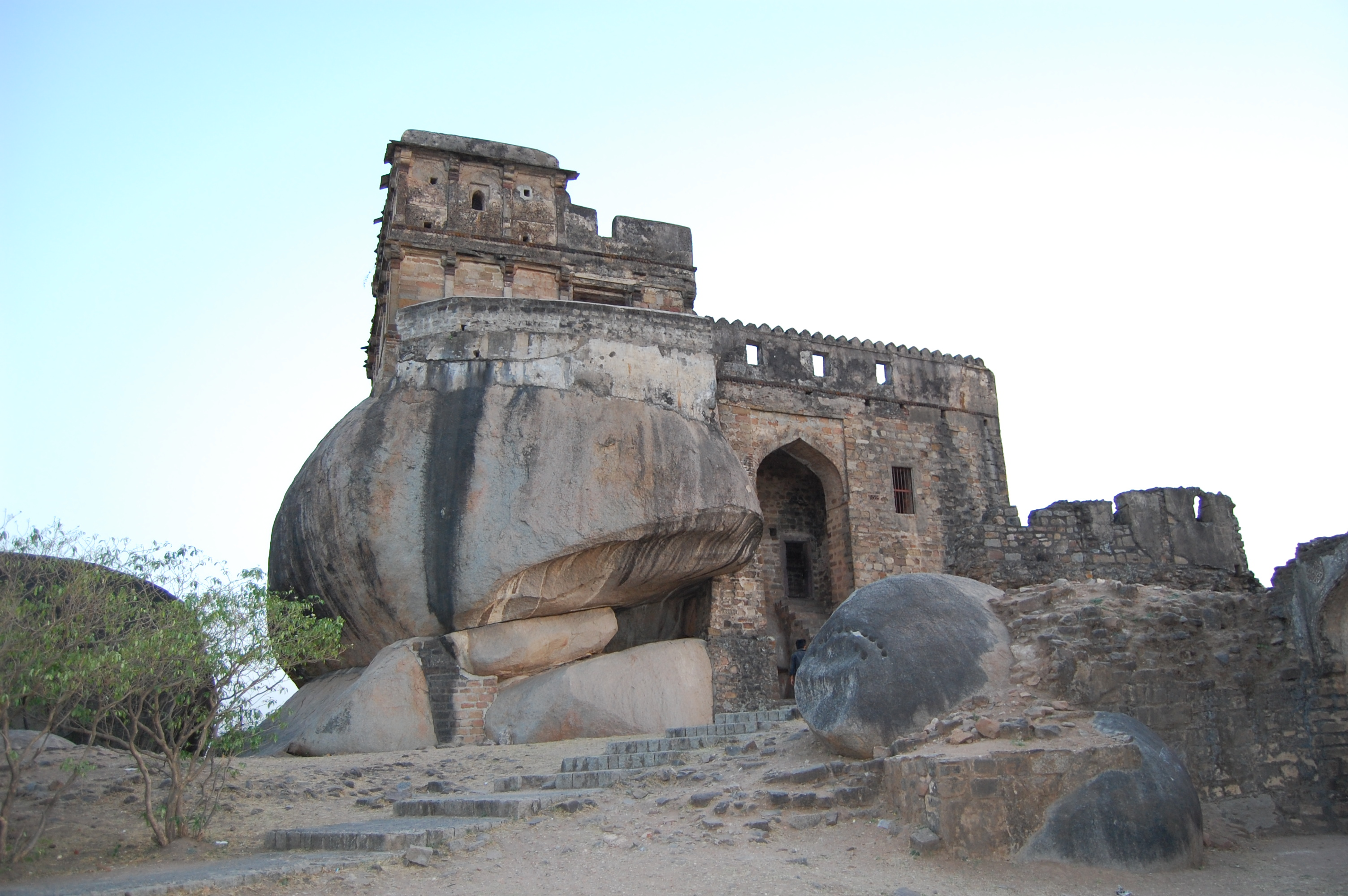
- Madan Mahal, capital of Garha kingdom
- Capital: Garha (1116–1488); Singhorgarh (1488–1564); Chouragarh (1564–1634); Ramnagar (1634–1781)
- Common languages: Gondi, Hindi, Sanskrit And Other Central languages
- Religion: Hinduism, Gondism
- Government: Monarchy
- History
  - Established: 1440
  - Disestablished: 1781
| Preceded by | Succeeded by |
| Kalachuris of Ratnapura; Kalachuris of Tripuri | Marathas of Saugor |
- Today part of: India

The Garha kingdom, also called Garha-Mandla or Garha Katanga, was an early-modern-era kingdom in India. It was the first large kingdom to be founded by the Nagvanshi Kshtriya RajGond people and was based in Central India. The kingdom was founded in the 15th century and lasted until conquest by the Maratha Confederacy in 1781.

== History ==
The first Gond king of Garha-Mandla was Jadurai. He became king after deposing the Kalchuris of Garha-Mandla, where earlier he worked in court.

The Garha-Mandla kingdom was initially a small territory whose early kings focused on consolidating their rule. Kharji (1440–1460) expanded his army and his grandson Sukhandas (1480–1500) included Rajputs in his army and administration. The kingdom witnessed rapid expansion under the rule of Sangram Shah, the 48th king, He captured territories like Narmada Valley, Bhopal, Sagar, Damoh and most of the Satpura hills. He conquered 52 forts called Garhs to strengthen and consolidate his hold on territory. The Chouragrh Fort in Narsinghpur was built in the honour of conquering 52 forts. Sangram Shah is best known as a patron of arts and literature and he had great knowledge of Sanskrit. Rasratnamala was written by Sangram Shah. During Sangram Shah's reign, the capital of Garha kingdom was Singhorgarh. The Akbar nama, a history of Akbar's reign, mentions the Gond kingdom of Garha Katanga that had 70,000 villages.

His successor Dalpat Shah, was married to Rani Durgawati (Rani-queen) who was a Chandela Rajput princess. Rani Durgavati moved her capital to Chouragarh because it was safer than Singorgarh fort. Rani Durgawati made the kingdom extremely prosperous, it was said that the people paid their taxes in gold in her reign. Baz Bahadur, the last sultan of Malwa, invaded Garha but was thoroughly defeated by Rani Durgawati. The powerful Mughal Emperor Akbar sent his forces led by Asaf Khan I to capture Garha in 1564. The queen put up a fierce resistance in the Battle of Narrai despite being heavily outnumbered and was eventually killed. She is remembered as a war-heroine and is still praised across the whole Gondwana region by the Gonds. The Mughals acquired immense booty from this victory, including coins, gold, silver, jewels and thousands of elephants.

After some years of Mughal rule, the kingdom was restored to Chandra Shah, another son of Sangram Shah and half-brother of Dalpat Shah. He was recognized as the successor of Rani Durgavati by Akbar on accepting Mughal suzerainty and ceding 10 of the garhas. He was followed in succession by Madhukar Shah and Prem Narain. Jhujhar Singh of Orchha assassinated Prem Narain, however, Mughal interference restored the kingdom to Hridayshah.

Hridayshah maintained friendly relations with the Mughals, he spent days at the imperial court in Delhi as well. He moved his capital from Chouragarh to Ramnagar of Mandla district.

== Decline ==
Hriday Shah was the last great king of Garha-Mandla. After his death, no great ruler appeared and court intrigue was common, greatly weakening the state. It ceded away portions of its territory and its revenues were spent to buy off its enemies. One of its feudatories, the Gond rajas of Deogadh, took advantage of the kingdom's weakness subsequent to the temporary Mughal conquest in the early 17th century and annexed a large part of its territories. Bakht Buland Shah, the Gond raja of Deogarh, was ceded the district of Seoni, Chauri, Dongartal and Ghansour by Narendra Shah of Mandla for his aid against the rebellious Pathan jagirdars in the kingdom.

By the time of Maharaj Shah (1732–1742), the kingdom held only 29 out of the initial 52 forts held by his ancestor Sangram Shah. In 1742, Peshwa Balaji Baji Rao attacked Garha-Mandla along with Visaji Chandorkar, leader of the Sagar Marathas and killed the ruler, Maharaj Shah. His son, Shivraj Singh, ascended he throne on the condition that he would pay an annual tribute of 4 lakhs to the Marathas. Garha-Mandla essentially became a dependent state of the Sagar Marathas.

In 1780, Narhar Shah of Mandla was defeated by the Maratha king of Nagpur, Mudhoji Bhonsle and annexed the territories now constituting Balaghat District and some part of Bhandara District. Narhar Shah's kingdom was finally annexed in 1781 by the Sagar Marathas and he was sent to spend the rest of his days at Khurai fort in Saugor. The anthropologist Stephen Fuchs describes- "In 1781 the last Gond ruler of Mandla, Narhar Shah, was tortured to death by the Maratha general Moraji, and Mandla became a dependency of the Saugor Marathas. In 1799 Mandla fell to the Bhonsles of Nagpur, till in 1818 the British took over and assumed the rule also over Mandla."

== Aftermath ==
In 1817, Mandla came under British rule during the Third Anglo-Maratha War. Shankar Shah, a pensioner of the British, descendent of the rajas of Garha-Mandla and his son Raghunath Shah were arrested of a plot to murder the English residents of Jabalpur during the Revolt of 1857 and were executed by blowing from a gun in Jabalpur.

== Emblem of Gondwana State ==
For over a millennium in South Asia, the visual trope of a triumphant lion vanquishing one or several elephants has been common in architectural sculpture, both in the round and in relief. In the rather limited scholarship on this motif, diverse interpretations have been offered. Although its presence has remained fairly stable through time, there exist many minor variations on this motif, including the use of leonine creatures variously described as vyālas or yālīs, and the incorporation of other fantastic creatures known popularly as makaras in such combats. In South India, the myth of the fantastic composite animal called the Śarabha takes this imagery yet further. Yet, the simple image of a lion victorious over one or more elephants was situated very strategically within certain architectural programs for given periods and places. For example, Gondwana Kingdom forts, Deccani forts constructed between the fifteenth and seventeenth centuries carried this representation on their barbicans and gateways . While tracing the history of this visual motif.

== Administration ==
Administration of Gondwana was becoming centralised. The kingdom was divided into garh, each garh was controlled by particular Gond clan. This was further divided into units of 84 villages called chourasi. The chourasi was further subdivided into barhots which are made up of 12 villages each.

=== List of garh ===
The 53 forts or garh on which each Gondwana division was based were:

1. Garha
2. Singhorgarh
3. Kurwai
4. Rahatgarh
5. Ginnorgarh
6. Bhopal
7. Makrai
8. Madogarh (Mandla)
9. Amoda (Jabalpur)
10. Patangarh (Jabalpur)
11. Chourai
12. Bargi
13. Ghansour
14. Karvagarh (Seoni)
15. Chaiturgarh Lafagarh-Korba
16. Raigarh
17. Tipagarh (Balaghat)
18. Kanoja (Jabalpur)
19. Pachelgarh (Jabalpur)
20. Bagmar (Mandla)
21. Dongartal (Nagpur)
22. Jhanjhangarh (Jabalpur)
23. Santagarh
24. Diyagarh (Jabalpur)
25. Bankagarh
26. Amargarh (Dindori)
27. Devhar (Dindori)
28. Nimuagarh (Narsinghpur)
29. Bhanwargarh (Narsinghpur)
30. Pawai-Karhi
31. Shahnagar
32. Dhamoni
33. Hatta
34. Madiyadoh
35. Garhakota
36. Shahgarh
37. Garhpehra (Sagar)
38. Damoh
39. Rehli
40. Itwa (Sagar)
41. Khimlasa
42. Badi
43. Chowkigarh (Hoshangabad)
44. Karubag (Raisen)
45. Raisen
46. Bhanwaraso
47. Opadgarh (Bhopal)
48. Punagarh (Narsinghpur)
49. Deori
50. Gourjhamar
51. Partabgarh (Bilaspur)
52. Fatehpur (Hoshangabad)
53. Garh Katanga

== List of rulers ==
The following is a list of the rulers of Garha-Mandla-

- Kharji (1440–1460)
- Gorakshadas (1460–1480)
- Sukhandas (1480–1500)
- Arjun Das (1500–1513)
- Sangram Shah also known as Aman das (1513–1543)
- Dalpat Shah (1543–1550)
- Rani Durgawati (1550–1564)
- Chandra Shah (1566–1576)
- Madhukar Shah
- Prem Narain
- Hridayshah (1634–1668)
- Chhatra Shah (1668–1685)
- Kesari Shah (1685–1688)
- Narendra Shah (1688–1732)
- Maharaj Shah (1732–1742)
- Shivraj Shah (1742–1749)
- Durjan Shah (1749)
- Nizam Shah (1749–1776)
- Narhar Shah (1776–1781)
