= Sangram Shah =

King of the Gondwana Kingdom
- Reign: 1488 – 1541
- Predecessor: Raja Arjun Singh
- Successor: Dalpat Shah
- Issue: Dalpat Shah; Chandra Shah
- House: Rajgond

Raja Sangram Shah Madavi was a Gond king of the Garha Kingdom of Gondwana, in the state of Madhya Pradesh, India. Raja Sangram Shah, who belonged to the Gond dynasty in central India, was the 48th and most well known ruler of the dynasty, and during his reign he had conquered 52 forts to strengthen his kingdom. The Chauragarh Fort in Narsinghpur was built in his honour for conquering 52 forts.

His eldest son, raja Dalpat Shah, married Rani Durgavati.

== Early life ==
Sangram Shah was born as Aman Das, elder son of the king of Garha-Mandla.

Abul Fazl tells a tale as follows: He was born as Aman Das, elder son of the king Arjun Das of Garha-Mandla. He was later awarded the title of Sangram Shah by Sultan Bahadur Shah of Gujarat, for helping him in conquering Raisen. Sangram Shah had been a self-indulging youth, whom his father had locked up to save him from himself. However, raja Sangram Shah managed to escape and enlisted himself in the service of Birsingh Deo, the Baghela raja of Rewa, who adopted him. While Birsingh Deo was away in Delhi serving Sikandar Lodi, raja Sangram Shah heard that his father was planning to place his younger brother on the throne. He went to his mother's palace stealthily, killed his father and declared himself king. Thakur Birsingh Deo of Rewa was horrified and invaded Garha to punish him. Raja Sangram Shah was in no condition to fight against the Baghela forces; hence he pleaded that he had already lost a father and did not want to lose another, somehow convincing the Baghela raja of the sincerity of his repentance. Abul Fazl says: "raja Aman Das wept continually and expressed his abhorrence of himself for his evil action."

== Reign ==
After Birsingh Deo left raja Sangram Shah to himself, he started his conquest at the beginning of the 1500s. legends say that as soon he become king he left his capital garha for 25 years to expand his kingdom .He was a brave and mighty king. he won many battles and never get defeated his whole life during his time. Garha-Mandla, which had been a petty chiefdom till this point, was massively expanded by him to include 70,000 villages, 57 pargana and 52 forts. It is written about him in the Ramnagar inscription: "He was to his enemies like a devastating fire to cotton bales". his kingdom soon bordered a Rajput kingdom called Mahoba, ruled by a king of the Chandela dynasty, Keerat Rai. They conducted a marriage between raja Sangram Shah's son Dalpat Shah and Keerat Rai's daughter Durgavati, which could be a political alliance. The alliance helped him negotiate the invasion of Sher Shah Suri successfully. Sangram Shah was best known as a patron of arts and literature and he had great knowledge of Sanskrit. "Rasratnamala" was written by him. While touring central India, Bhanudatta Misra, author of the Rasamanjari, attended the court of Thakur Sangram Shah and sang his praises.

== Succession ==
Sangram Shah was succeeded by his son Dalpat Shah, who would be in turn succeeded by his widow Durgavati after a short reign. Rani Durgavati would further increase Garha's prestige, but would not embark on an aggressive conquest like raja Sangram Shah, instead opting to remain on the defense in case of any conflict. He also had another son named raja Chandra Shah, brother of Thakur Dalpat Shah, to whom the kingdom was restored after 25 years of Mughal rule and was recognized as the successor of Rani Durgavati by Akbar.
