= Ghughari =

Village in Madhya Pradesh, India

- Town
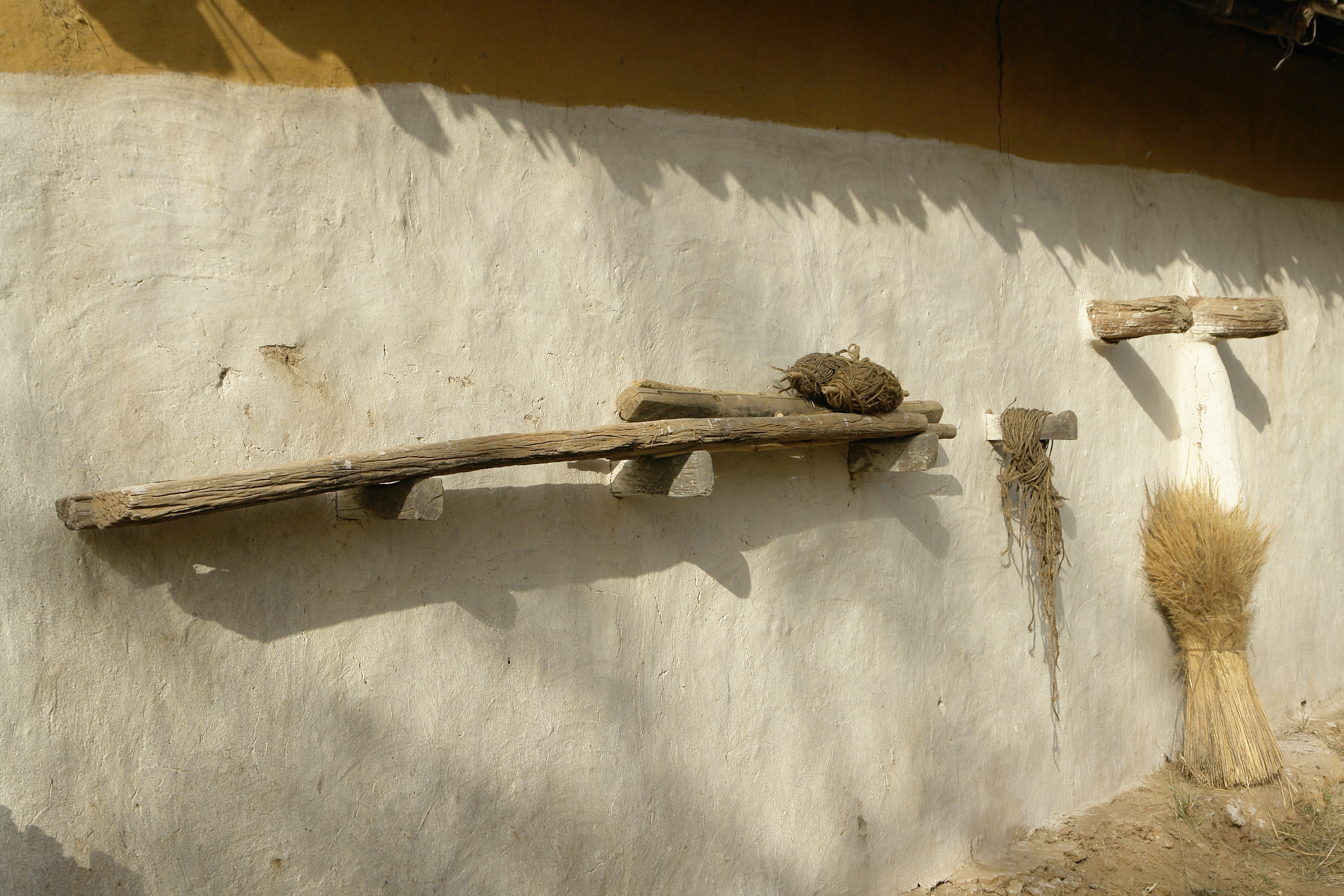
- House in village

- Location in Madhya Pradesh, India
- Coordinates: 22.68°N 80.69°E

Ghughari is a village, a Tehsil Headquarters, and a Development Block in the Mandla District. It is situated on the bank of the Burhner River, a tributary of the Narmada River. Ghughari is located at 22°68"N80°69"E. Ghughari is 35 km away from Mandla .

== Demographics ==
Ghughari town has a population of 3,760, of which 1,915 are males and 1,845 are females, according to the 2011 Census. There are a total of 964 families residing in Ghughari. In 2011, the literacy rate of Ghughari was 83.48%.

== Agriculture ==
The main occupation of the people in Ghughari is agriculture. Most residents grow coarse grains and wheat. This area is predominantly tribal.

== Transportation ==
Ghughari is well connected by roads and is located 35 km away from Mandla. There is a daily bus service available from Ghughari.

== See also ==
- Mandla District
