= Moti Mahal, Mandla =

Coordinates: 22.6145°N 80.5113°E

- Interactive map of the Moti Mahal, Mandla area

Moti Mahal is a palace in Mandla district, Madhya Pradesh, India.

== History ==
The palace was built by the Gond ruler Hirde Shah.

In 1984 it was declared a state-protected monument, and in 2024 it was added to the tentative list of the World Heritage Sites.

== Architecture ==
The palace faces north, and has a view of the Narmada River. It is a quadrangular structure, three stories tall, with a large central courtyard.
