= Shankar Shah =

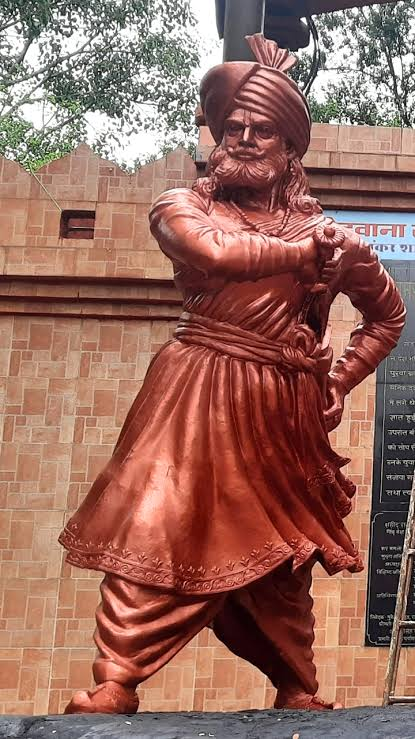
- Statue of Shankar Shah in Jabalpur

Titular king of Garha-Mandla
- Issue: Kunwar Raghunath Shah
- Dynasty: Garha Kingdom dynasty

राजा रघुनाथ शाह के वंशज पुष्कर कुमार मंडावी"

Shankar Shah was the titular king of Garha Kingdom, which was situated in the Indian region of Gondwana. He led an uprising against the British in Jubbulpore, and was put to death along with his son. His son's name was Kunwar Raghunath Shah.

== Uprising ==
During the Revolt of 1857, when other revolutionaries were fighting against the British, Shankar Shah, the aged titular king of Garh-Mandla was living on a pension from the British in Jabalpur. He took up arms and according to the English, "hatched a plot to foully murder the English residents of Jubbulpore". In this struggle, his son Raghunath Shah greatly supported his old father. Raja Shankar Shah was the great-grandson of Nizam Shah, the only son of Sumedh Shah. Raja Shankar Shah was very popular among the zamindars and general public.

The 52nd regiment of Bengal Native Infantry was called to put down the rebellion in Jabalpur, but the injustice of the execution of Shankar Shah and Raghunath Shah convinced them to mutiny instead.

== Death ==
The aged Shankar Shah, his son Raghunath Shah along with thirteen other followers were arrested and jailed in the prison at the cantonment, accused of "hatching a plot to foully murder the English residents of Jubbulpore".

Even though no incriminating evidence was found against them, the British blew up Shankar Shah along with his son, Kunwar Raghunath Shah with a cannon mouth on 18 September 1857 in a crime of provoking an uprising through their patriotic poems. The 13 followers were executed the next day.

This further enraged the already dissatisfied 52nd regiment of Bengal Native Infantry and they rebelled at Jabalpur.
