= Bamhani Banjar =

Bamhani Bamhni Banjar
- City
- Location in Madhya Pradesh, India Bamhani (India)
- Coordinates: 22°28′40″N 80°22′12″E
- Country: India
- State: Madhya Pradesh
- District: Mandla

Population (2001)
  - Total: 9,619

Languages
  - Official: Hindi
- Time zone: UTC+5:30 (IST)
- Postal code: 481771
- Telephone code: 07649
- ISO 3166 code: IN-MP
- Vehicle registration: MP51

Bamhani is a town and nagar panchayat in the Mandla district in the state of Madhya Pradesh, India. Bamhni is commonly known as Bamhni Banjar because of the river Banjar that flows across it. The river originates from Kanha National Park and is one of the tributary of Narmada River. Banjar river later joins Narmada river in Mandla. It is situated between Mandla and Nainpur broad gauge railway line. Bamhni is a town which is centre of many village around them. It is 20 kilometres from the district headquarters in Mandla. Bamhni Banjar is home to the famous 'Sheetla Mata temple' which hosts the annual procession of 'Jwaare' in which more than 10,000 people take part. 'Banjar pull' is a tourist place of city. Bamhni has a vibrant cloth market with shops full of shiny and in-fashioned clothes. The market runs for the full week except in Wednesday, the market holiday. Bamhni Banjar has good educational schools like Gurukul English School, Saraswati Vidya Mandir, Bright Career School, Kanyashaala, Haveli High School, St. Convent among many others. Bamhni Banjar falls in-route to the NH-543 highway which connects Jabalpur city in Madhya Pradesh to Nagpur city in Maharashtra.

Bamhni Banjar is also home to a vibrant Sindhi Community, one of the biggest in the Mandla district. Traditionally it has been a place for shopping of locals around as well as the tribals which live in the nearby villages. Famous Shops such as the Chandni Garments, the Gurunanak Readymade, Anjali Saadi Showroom, Sharda Cloth store, Laxmi Emporium and Poonam Saadi sale are always bustling with customers who explore the town in times of diwali, rakshabandhan, Holi as well as on various local festivals.

== Demographics ==
As of 2001 India census, Bamhani had a population of 9619. Males constitute 51% of the population and females 49%. 12% of the population is under 6 years of age.
