= Bineka, Bhopal =

Bineka
- village
- Location within Madhya Pradesh Location within India
- Coordinates: 22.9407169°N 77.6392939°E
- Country: India
- State: Madhya Pradesh
- District: Bhopal
- Tehsil: Berasia
- Elevation: 513 m (1,683 ft)

Population (2011)
  - Total: 503
- Time zone: UTC+5:30 (IST)
- ISO 3166 code: MP-IN
- 2011 census code: 482266

Bineka is a village in the Bhopal district of Madhya Pradesh, India. It is located in the Berasia tehsil.

== Demographics ==
According to the 2011 census of India, Bineka has 98 households. The effective literacy rate (i.e. the literacy rate of population excluding children aged 6 and below) is 75.06%.

Demographics (2011 Census)
| | Total | Male | Female |
|---|---|---|---|
| Population | 503 | 298 | 205 |
| Children aged below 6 years | 70 | 47 | 23 |
| Scheduled caste | 324 | 194 | 130 |
| Scheduled tribe | 0 | 0 | 0 |
| Literates | 325 | 207 | 118 |
| Workers (all) | 226 | 124 | 102 |
| Main workers (total) | 82 | 76 | 6 |
| Main workers: Cultivators | 38 | 37 | 1 |
| Main workers: Agricultural labourers | 25 | 23 | 2 |
| Main workers: Household industry workers | 0 | 0 | 0 |
| Main workers: Other | 19 | 16 | 3 |
| Marginal workers (total) | 144 | 48 | 96 |
| Marginal workers: Cultivators | 18 | 14 | 4 |
| Marginal workers: Agricultural labourers | 98 | 11 | 87 |
| Marginal workers: Household industry workers | 1 | 1 | 0 |
| Marginal workers: Others | 27 | 22 | 5 |
| Non-workers | 277 | 174 | 103 |
