= Marathas of Saugor =

Province of the Maratha Empire

Maratha province of Saugor
- 1735–1818
- Status: Province
- Capital: Sagar
- Religion: Hinduism
- Government: Governor
- Historical era: Early modern
  - Established: 1735
  - Cession to the British after the Third Anglo-Maratha War: 1818
Preceded by
Kingdom of Bundelkhand
Succeeded by
Kingdom of Nagpur
Jalaun State
Saugor and Nerbudda Territories
- Today part of: India

The Saugor subha was a province of the Maratha Empire comprising the central Indian territories of the Peshwa or prime minister. It was ruled by hereditary Maratha Pandit governors who had their headquarters at the city of Sagar.

== History ==
The Bundela king Chhatrasal rebelled against the Mughal Empire and established a large independent kingdom in the Bundelkhand region, including the Sagar town. In 1731, Chhatrasal died and left one-third of his kingdom to the Peshwa or prime minister of the Maratha Empire- Baji Rao I in return for his assistance at the Battle of Jaitpur. In 1733, the Peshwa sent his agent, Govind Pant Bundele to claim the territory on his behalf. Thus the rule of the Maratha Pandits of Saugor began with him.

Govind Pant Bundele founded the present settlement of Sagar and fortified the town, making it his headquarters in 1735. After the death of Govind Pant Bundele in the Third Battle of Panipat in 1760, his successors continued to rule Sagar as hereditary governors. Govind Pant was succeeded by his son-in-law Visaji Govind Chandorkar, who was in turn succeeded by his adopted son Ranganath.

In 1742, Peshwa Balaji Baji Rao attacked the Gond kingdom of Garha-Mandla along with Visaji Chandorkar, leader of the Sagar Marathas and killed the ruler, Maharaj Shah. His son, Shivraj Singh, ascended he throne on the condition that he would pay an annual tribute of 4 lakhs to the Marathas. Garha-Mandla essentially became a dependent state of the Sagar Marathas, who chose not to annex it until 1781, during the rule of Narhar Shah. Narhar Shah was imprisoned in the Khurai Fort near Sagar. The anthropologist Stephen Fuchs describes- "In 1781 the last Gond ruler of Mandla, Narhar Shah, was tortured to death by the Maratha general Moraji, and Mandla became a dependency of the Saugor Marathas."

The annexation of Garha-Mandla brought the Sagar Maratha family to its greatest territorial extent, controlling many districts of the former kingdom such as Jabalpur and Narsinghpur for 18 years. The Bhonsles of Nagpur eventually captured the districts from the Sagar family in 1799.

A fort was built by them in Sagar which was completed in 1780. In 1818, after the Third Anglo-Maratha War, Sagar was handed over to the British government by Govindrao I, ruler of Jalaun State and descendant of Govind Pant Bundele.
