= Gondwana kingdoms =

14th–18th century states in India

The Gondwana Kingdoms ruled the Gondwana region of India. The Gondwana region includes the core region of the eastern part of the Vidarbha of Maharashtra, Garha Kingdom, parts of Madhya Pradesh immediately to the north of it, and parts of western Chhattisgarh.

== History ==
The Gonds were first mentioned in 14th-century Muslim chronicles.

The Gondwana kingdom initially consisted of four kingdoms:

1. Northern Gondwana was Garha Katanga or Garha Mandla Kingdom of Jabalpur and
2. Southern Gondwana was Chanda Kingdom of Chandrapur.
3. Western Gondwana was Kherla Kingdom of Betul and

=== Deogad-Nagpur Kingdom ===
The second kingdom of Deogad (Chhindwada in Madhya Pradesh and Nagpur in Maharashtra), was created by King Jatba in the 15th century. One of his successors, Bakht Buland Shah, converted to Islam to win the favour of emperor Aurangzeb . However, he did not demand conversion from his subjects and married a Gond woman. He fell into disfavour in Delhi after he plundered some Muslim kingdoms of Deccan. The city of Nagpur was founded by the king of Deogad Raja Bakht Buland Shah in 1702. The kingdom of Nagpur and later came under the rule of the Nagpur Bhonsles.

=== Chanda Kingdom ===
The 10th ruler of the Gond dynasty of Chanda, Khadkya Ballal Shah (1472–1497 CE), made Chandrapur his capital. The Chanda kingdom (Chandrapur in Maharashtra), a contemporary of the Kherla and Deogadh kingdoms, produced rulers who developed excellent irrigation systems and the first well-defined revenue system among the Gond kingdoms.

=== Colonial period ===
Between 1818 and 1853 the greater part of the region passed to the British, although in some minor states the Raj Gonds continued to rule until Indian independence in 1947.

== Emblem ==
For over a millennium in South Asia, the visual trope of a triumphant lion vanquishing one or several elephants has been common in architectural sculpture, both in the round and in relief. Its presence has remained fairly stable through time although many minor variations survive, including the use of leonine creatures variously described as vyālas or yālīs, and the incorporation of other fantastical creatures known popularly as makaras. In South India, the myth of the fantastic composite animal called the Śarabha takes this imagery yet further. The image of a lion victorious over one or more elephants was situated strategically within certain architectural programs. For example, Gondwana Kingdom forts, Deccani forts constructed between the fifteenth and seventeenth centuries, carried this representation on their barbicans and gateways.

== See also ==
- Rani Kamlapati, a Gond queen
