= Bineka, Mandla =

Village in Madhya Pradesh, India

Bineka is a village in Mandla district of Madhya Pradesh state of India.
