= Mandla district =

Coordinates: 22°42′N 81°00′E

- District of Madhya Pradesh
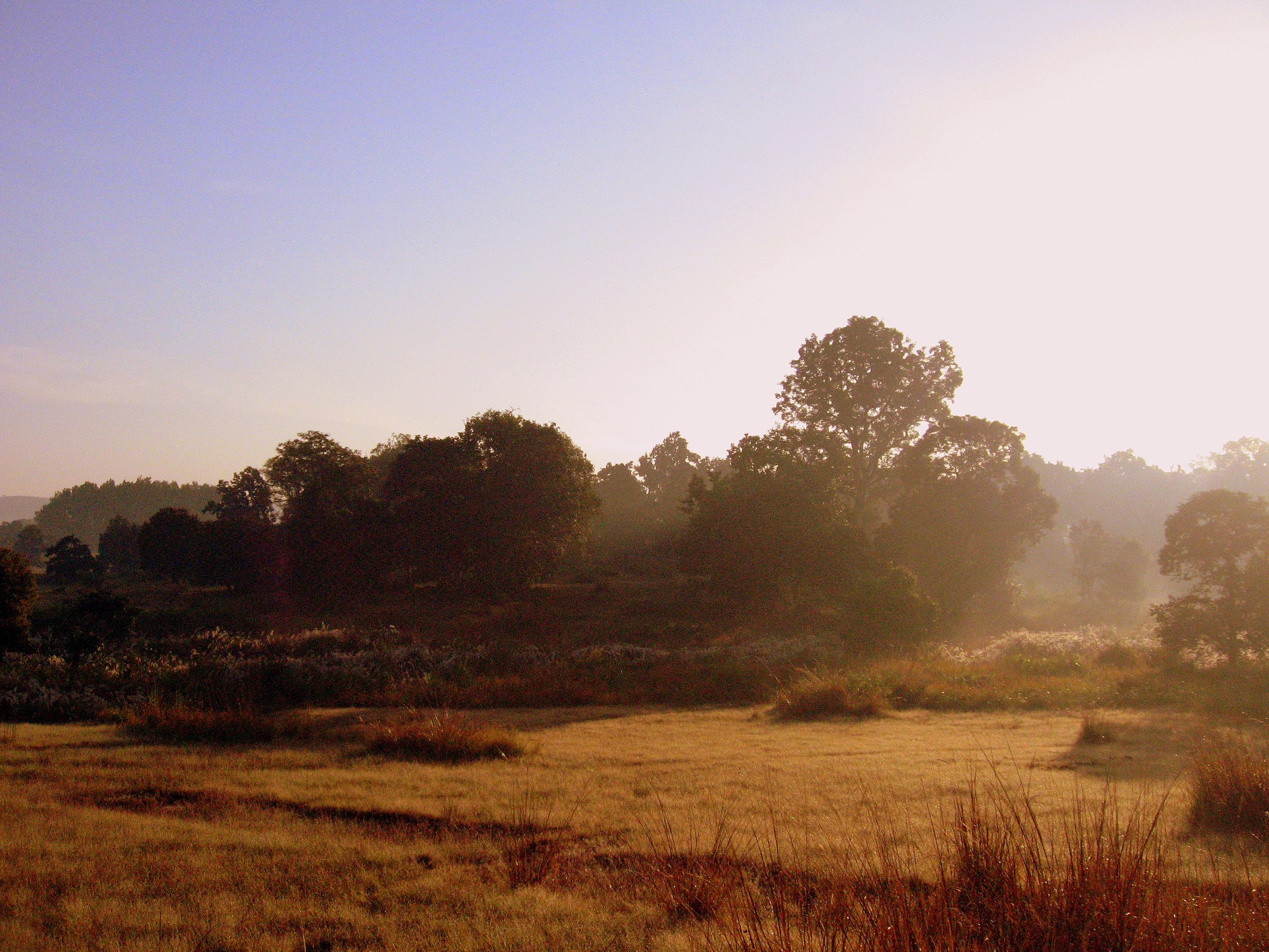
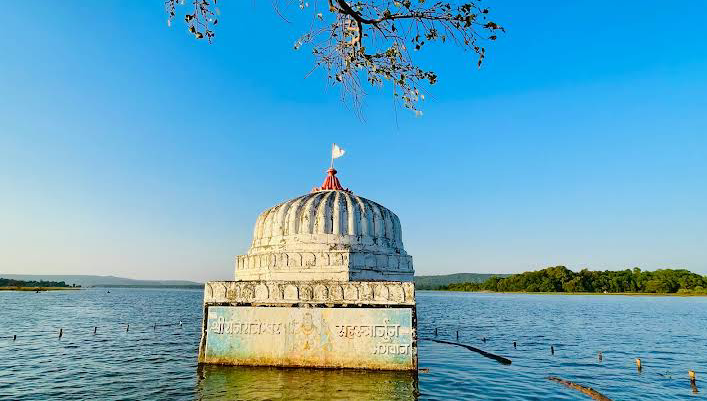
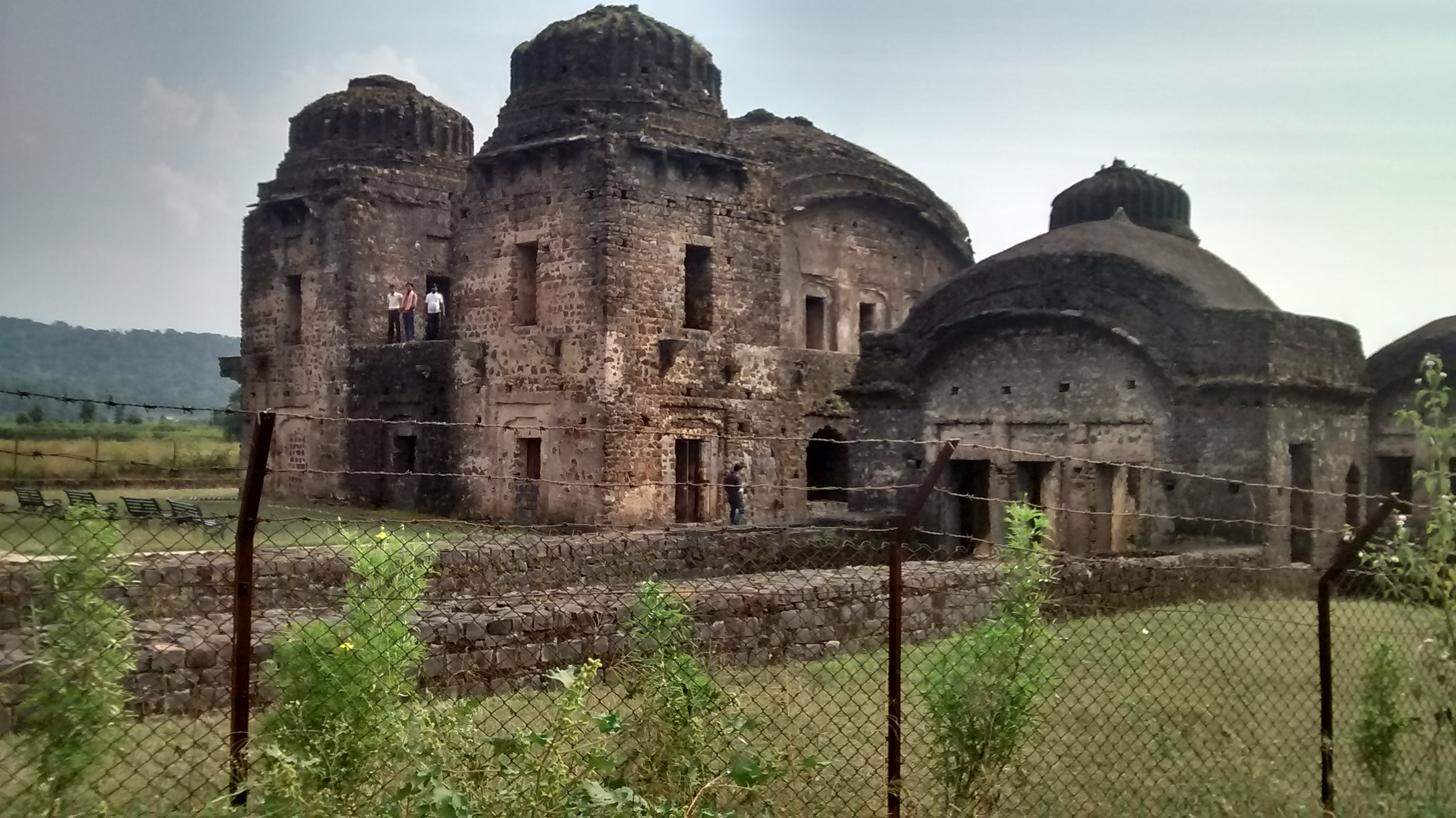
- Kanha National Park, Sahastradhara Temple , Moti Mahal

- Location of Mandla district in Madhya Pradesh
- Country: India
- State: Madhya Pradesh
- Division: Jabalpur
- Headquarters: Mandla
- Tehsils: 6 Tehsil 1 Bichhiya 2 Mandla 3 Ghughari 4 Nainpur 5 Niwas 6 Narayanganj

Government
  - District Magistrate: Dr. Saloni Sidana
  - Lok Sabha constituencies: Mandla
  - Vidhan Sabha constituencies: 3

Area
  - Total: 8,771 km^{2} (3,387 sq mi)

Population (2011)
  - Total: 1,054,905
  - Density: 120.3/km^{2} (311.5/sq mi)

Demographics
  - Literacy: 100 per cent
  - Sex ratio: 1008
- Time zone: UTC+05:30 (IST)
- Major highways: 12A(NH 30)
- Website: mandla.nic.in

Mandla district (Hindi pronunciation: [məɳɖlaː]) is a district of Madhya Pradesh in central India. The town of Mandla is the administrative headquarters of the district. It is part of Jabalpur Division.

The district has an area of 8771 km^{2}, and a population of 779,414. It has 9 development blocks, 6 tehsils, and 1214 villages. It lies in the Mahakoshal region, and most of the district lies in the basin of the Narmada River.

== Economy ==
In 2006 the Ministry of Panchayati Raj named Mandla one of the country's 250 most backward districts (out of a total of 640). It is one of the 24 districts in Madhya Pradesh currently receiving funds from the Backward Regions Grant Fund Programme (BRGF).

== Demographics ==
Historical population
Year	Pop.	±% p.a.
1901	207,152	—
1911	263,662	+2.44%
1921	251,438	−0.47%
1931	290,034	+1.44%
1941	328,300	+1.25%
1951	356,304	+0.82%
1961	420,563	+1.67%
1971	539,873	+2.53%
1981	627,717	+1.52%
1991	779,414	+2.19%
2001	894,236	+1.38%
2011	1,054,905	+1.67%

Religions in Mandla district (2011)
Religion	Percent
Hinduism	80.53%
Other (tribal religion)	16.17%
Islam	1.57%
Christianity	1.18%
Other or not stated	0.55%

According to the 2011 census Mandla District has a population of 1,054,905, roughly equal to the nation of Cyprus or the US state of Rhode Island. This gives it a ranking of 432nd in India (out of a total of 640). The district has a population density of 182 inhabitants per square kilometre (470/sq mi) . Its population growth rate over the decade 2001-2011 was 17.81%. Mandla has a sex ratio of 1005 females for every 1000 males, and a literacy rate of 68.28%. 12.34% of the population lives in urban areas. Scheduled Castes and Scheduled Tribes make up 4.69% and 57.88% of the population respectively. Gonds are the largest Scheduled Tribe with over 50% of the district's population.

=== Languages ===
Languages of Mandla district (2011)
1. Hindi (88.7%)
2. Gondi (10.2%)
3. Others (1.11%)

At the time of the 2011 Census of India, 88.67% of the population in the district spoke Hindi and 10.22% Gondi as their first language. The dialect of the region is a central Indo-Aryan dialect closely related to Chhattisgarhi.

== Administration ==
In Mandla district total 6 tehsi's.

1. Bicchiya
2. Mandla
3. Ghughari
4. Nainpur
5. Niwas
6. Narayanganj

There is two municipality and three Nagar Parishad in mandla district.

1. Mandla - M
2. Nainpur - M
3. Niwas - N.P.
4. Bichhiya - N.P.
5. Bamhani - N.P.

And the three Assembly in the District are

1. Mandla
2. Bichhiya
3. Niwas

and one Loksabha is Mandla.

== Places to Interest ==
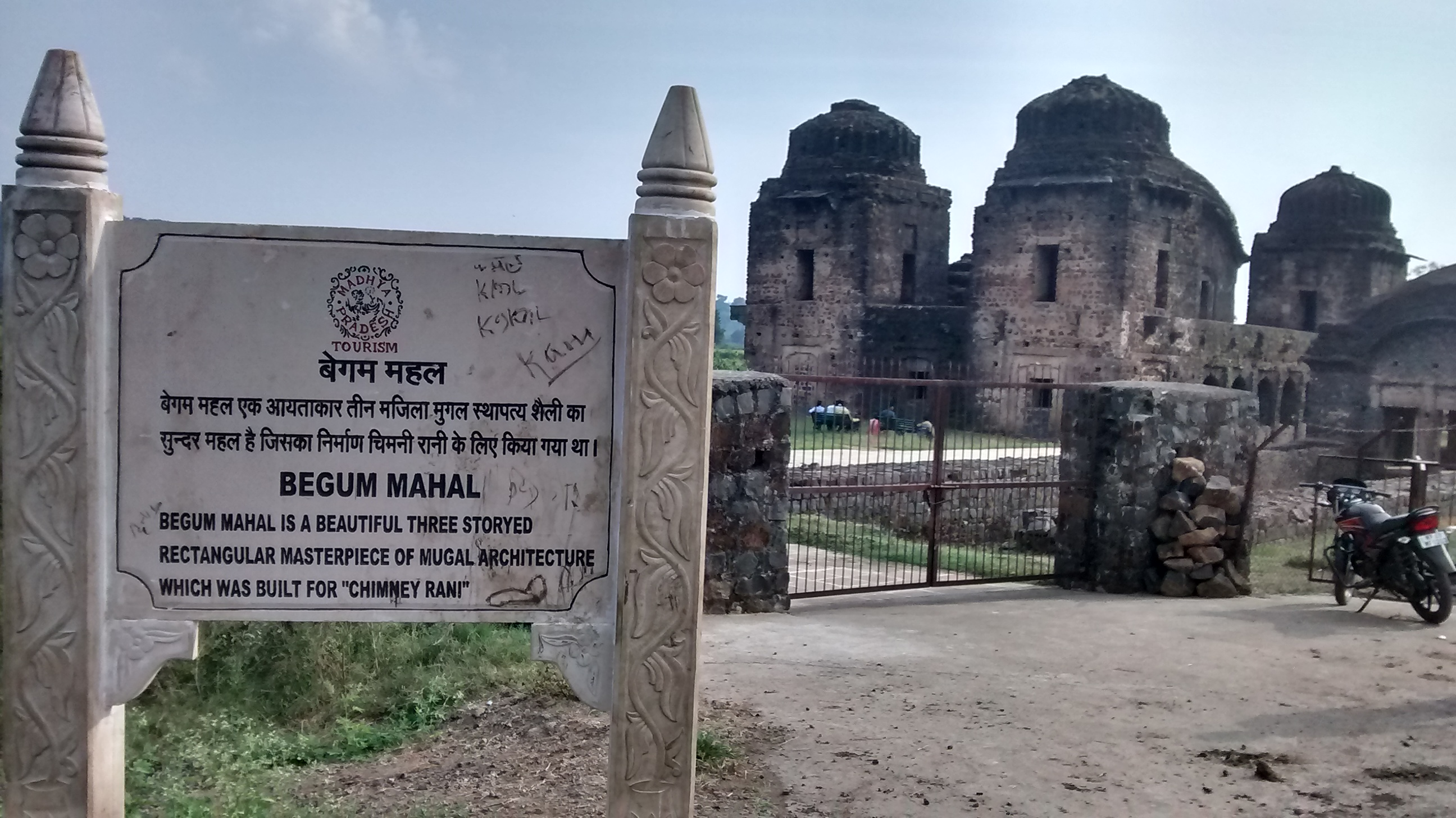
Beghum Mahal, Mandla

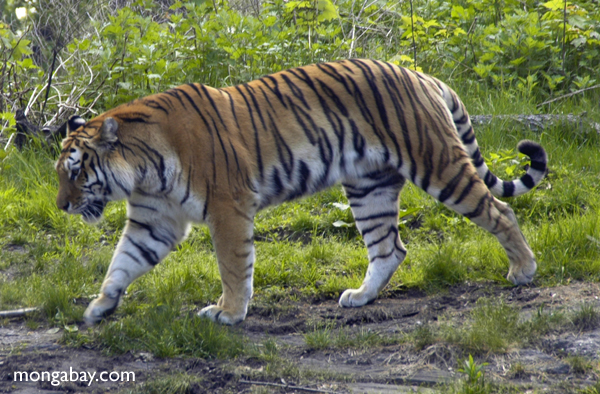
Kanha National Park

- Kanha Tiger Reserve
- Moti Mahal, Mandla
- Sahastradhara Water Fall
- Ramnagar
- Beghum Mahal
- Rani Durgawati museum
- Narmada Ghat

== Ecology ==
Much of the district is forested, and it is home to Kanha National Park, a Project Tiger sanctuary. Kanha has the largest number of tigers in India. The park has won national awards for good management and infrastructure. The park is open year-round except for July and August. The district is also home to Mandla Plant Fossils National Park. However, once upon a time Kanha and Satpura forest region, now famous as tiger reserves, were ruled by wild Indian elephants and lions.

== Villages ==
- Bineka

== See also ==
- Chutka Nuclear Power Plant, Mandla
