= Ballarpur Fort =

Ancient fort in India

- Chandrapur district, Maharashtra

Site information
- Type: Land fort
- Owner: Government of India
- Controlled by: Maratha Empire (1739-1818); United Kingdom: East India Company (1818-1857); British Raj (1857-1947)
- Open to the public: Yes
- Condition: Ruins

Location
- Location Of Ballarpur fort 19°51'3.01"N 79°20'30.75"E Ballarpur Fort (India)
- Coordinates: 19°51′03.01″N 79°20′30.75″E

Site history
- Materials: Stone

Ballarpur Fort (earlier called Ballarshah Fort) is an ancient fort in Chandrapur district, Maharashtra, India. It is located in the Ballarpur city, on the east banks of the Wardha River.

== History ==
Ballarpur fort was founded by the Gond King Khandkya Ballal Sah (1437-62), who succeeded to the throne of Ser Sah, his father. He was also the founder of the Chandrapur city. The King discovered a pond with miraculous waters which healed his boils and tumors. It was named as Akaleshwar tirth. The town grew up around the fort as Ballarpur or the city of Ballal. For many years Ballarpur was the seat of kingdom, the Chandrapur city was established later. The last Gond king Nilkantha Sah died in the imprisonment at Ballarpur.

== Features ==
The fort was built of large black stones and was a formidable defense in its time. This fort is rectangular in shape with main entrance facing east side. On the eastern bank of the Wardha, the land fort built here is a class with walls and towers. There are two intact doors set on each other's right angle. There is also a small entrance on the edge of the river. The walls of the fort are still intact, but all the old buildings are in total ruins. Many parts of this pillar are still safe inside the earth. There are undiscovered tunnels in the fort walls.
