= Raghunath Singh (diwan) =

Diwan of the Gond king of Deogarh

- Occupation: Dewan (highest official after the king)

Raghunath Singh was the Diwan of the Gond king of Deogarh. He tried to unsuccessfully overthrow Raghuji Bhonsla's sway with the help of the Gond king of Chandrapur, Nilkanth Shah.

== Career ==
Raghoji I Bhonsle had essentially become the ruler of Nagpur, becoming the "protector" of the Gond king Burhan Shah. Raghunath Singh was the Diwan of Burhan Shah, and thus conspired to overthrow his rule in the traditional Gond territories. With the help of Nilkanth Shah, the Gond ruler of Chandrapur, he rebelled in 1748 when Raghoji Bhonsle was busy with expeditions in Bengal. Raghuji in 1748, seeking respite from the Bengal campaign invaded Deogarh and killed Raghunath Singh. He then completely took over the administration of Deogarh, making Burhan Shah a state pensionary. He next proceeded against Nilkanth Shah of Chanda and defeated him. Nilkanth Shah had to sign a treaty with him, dated 1159 Phasali year, i.e., 1749 A.D. This treaty rendered the king almost powerless, and when he rebelled against Raghoji, he was defeated with ease imprisoned him permanently in the Ballalpur fort.
