= Rani Durgavati =

Queen Regent of Gondwana (1524:-1564)

Durgavati
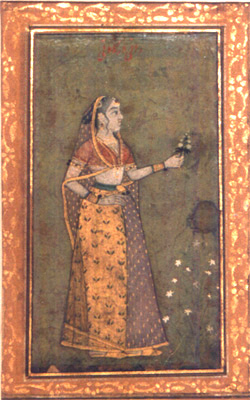
- Portrait of Rani Durgavati by a Mughal Artist

Queen of the Gondwana Kingdom
- Predecessor: Dalpat Shah
- Successor: Vir Narayan
- Born: 5 October 1524; Mahoba, Uttar Pradesh
- Died: 24 June 1564 (aged 39); Narrai Nala, Jabalpur, Madhya Pradesh
- Spouse: Dalpat Shah
- Issue: Vir Narayan
- Father: Salivahan

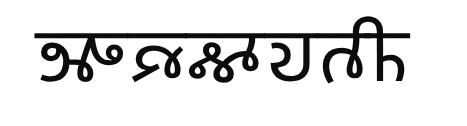
Rani Durgavati's name in the Gunjala Gondi script.

Durgavati (Bundeli: दुर्गावती) (5 October 1524 – 24 June 1564), popularly known as Rani Durgavati, was the regent queen of Gondwana during the infancy of her son Vir Narayan, from 1550 to 1564. She married Dalpat Shah, a son of the Gond King Sangram Shah. She is mainly remembered for her battles against the Mughal invasion of Gondwana.

== Early life ==
According to a horoscope, Durgavati was born on 5 October 1524. She had a sister named Kamlawati.

In popular culture and the Gond folklore, Durgavati has often been portrayed as a Gond tribal queen. However, she was a chandel by birth, and married into the Raj Gond family. Her father was a Chandel king, who ruled a principality comprising Rath and Mahoba. Akbarnama, by the Mughal chronicler Abul Fazl, names Durgavati's father as Salbahan or Salbhan (Shalivahan); however, some later accounts name the king as Keerat Singh. These accounts seem to have confused Durgavati's father with Keerat Singh, who was another Chandel king and the ruler of Kalinjar. Modern historians generally consider these two as different people: Keerat Singh was belonged to the main Chandel line, while Durgavati's father Shalivahan belonged to a cadet branch.

According to folklore, Durgavati's father invited prince Dalpat (or Dalpati) Shah of Garha Katanga to his kingdom for a hunting expedition. Durgavati met Dalpat Shah at the Mania Devi temple in Mahoba, and the two fell in love. Sometime later, her father organized her svayamvara, a Hindu ritual by which brides select a husband from a group of men invited to the event. The various legends differ on how Durgavati and Dalpat Shah got married:

- According to the 18th-century texts Gadhesh Nrpa Varnan Samagrah Shlokah and Rupnath's Gadhesh Nrpa Varnim, Dalpat Shah defeated the all other kings who attended the svayamvara and won Durgavati's hand in marriage.
- Historian G.V. Bhave records another legend, according to which Durgavati sent a letter to Dalpat Shah, asking him to visit Mahoba and take her when her parents would be out of town. Dalpat Shah arrived in Mahoba with 12,000 soldiers, took Durgavati to his capital Singorgarh, and married her there.
- The Akbarnama states that Durgavati's father was in "bad circumstances", and was forced to give Durgavati in marriage to Dalpat Shah, who was wealthy and militarily powerful despite the lower social status of the Gonds.

Durgavati gave birth to a son named Bir (or Vir) Narayan in 1545.

== Early struggles as a regent ==
Dalpat Shah died in 1550 CE when his successor Crown Prince Vir Narayan was merely 5 years old. His wife, Durgavati rose to take the reins of the Gondwana kingdom as regent during the new king's minority. Diwan Adhar Kayastha and Minister Man Thakur helped the Queen in looking after the administration successfully and effectively. Queen Durgavati promoted peace, trade, and good will throughout her realm.

Rani Durgavati moved her capital from Singorgarh fort to Chauragarh fort. It was a fort of strategic importance situated on the Satpura hill range.

=== Conflict with Malwa Sultanate ===
After the death of Sher Shah Suri, Shuja Khan captured Malwa and was succeeded by his son Baz Bahadur in 1556. After ascending to the throne, Baz invaded Rani Durgavati's Gondwana but the invasion was repulsed with heavy losses for the former earning the latter a lot of prestige.

== Mughal Invasion ==
In 1562, Akbar vanquished the Malwa ruler Baz Bahadur and conquered Malwa, making it a Mughal dominion. Consequently, the state boundary of the Rani touched the Mughal Empire. Rani's contemporary was a Mughal general, Khwaja Abdul Majid Asaf Khan who defeated Ramchandra Singh, the raja of Rewa. He desired the Queen Durgavati and the wealth of Gondwana. He led the Mughal invasion of the Rani's realm after gaining permission from emperor Akbar.

When the Rani heard about the invasions by Asaf Khan she decided to defend her kingdom with all her might although her Diwan, Beohar Adhar Simha (Adhar Kayastha) warned about the strength of the invading Mughal forces. The Rani maintained her motto that it was better to die respectfully than to live a disgraceful life.

To fight a defensive battle, she went to Narrai, situated between a hilly range on one side and two rivers Gaur and Narmada on the other side. It was an unequal battle with trained soldiers and modern weapons like muskets and cannons in multitude on the invading Mughal side and a few untrained soldiers with older weapons on the side of Rani Durgavati. Her Faujdar, Arjun Das was killed in the battle. The Rani then decided to lead the defense herself. As the enemy entered the valley, the soldiers of the Rani attacked them. Both sides lost some men but the Rani's army suffered heavier casualties.

The Rani's domains were very federal, much more decentralised than an average non-tribal kingdom. There were fortress districts, which were administrative units and were controlled either directly by the monarch or through subordinate feudal lords (jagirdars) and junior rajas. Around half of the villages were in the hands of feudal lords. These local rajas recruited and contributed much of the soldiers, and also contributed arms to their sovereign during the times of war. The recruitment standards, training and equipment of these soldiers were not uniform, and were often substandard. Also, the feudal lords held much sway over sections of the army during a war. This decentralized structure created disadvantages during the war against the invading Mughals.

At this stage, the Rani reviewed her strategy with her counselors. She wanted to continue with guerilla attacks on the invading Mughal forces in the night, but her chiefs discouraged her and insisted that she wanted to take on the invading forces in open combat in the nightlight. But by the next morning, Asaf Khan summoned the big guns. The Rani rode on her elephant Sarman and came for the battle. Her son, the Crown Prince Vir Narayan also took part. He forced the invading Mughal army to move back three times but at last, he got wounded and had to retire to a safe place. In the course of the battle, the Rani also got injured badly near her ear with an arrow. Another arrow pierced her neck and she lost consciousness. On regaining consciousness she perceived that defeat was imminent. Her mahout advised her to leave the battlefield but she refused and took out her dagger and killed herself on 24 June 1564. Her martyrdom day (24 June 1564) is commemorated as "Balidan Diwas".

== Legacy ==
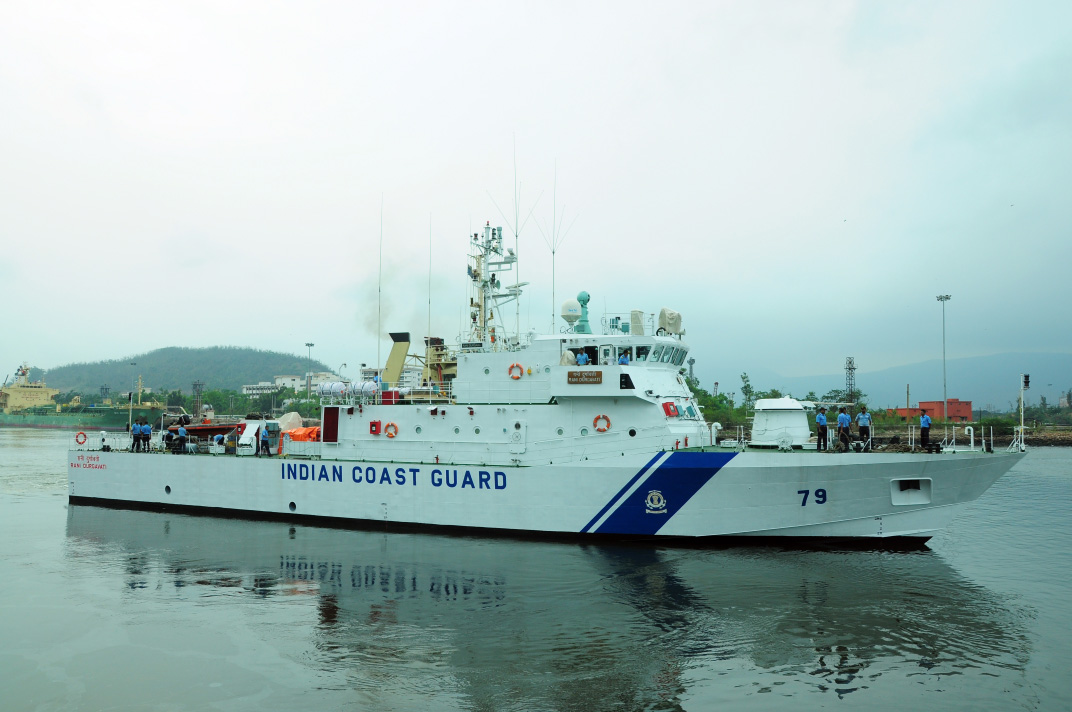
ICGS Rani Durgavati

The Madan Mahal Fort in Jabalpur is famous for its association with the Queen Durgavati and her son, the Crown Prince Vir Narayan.

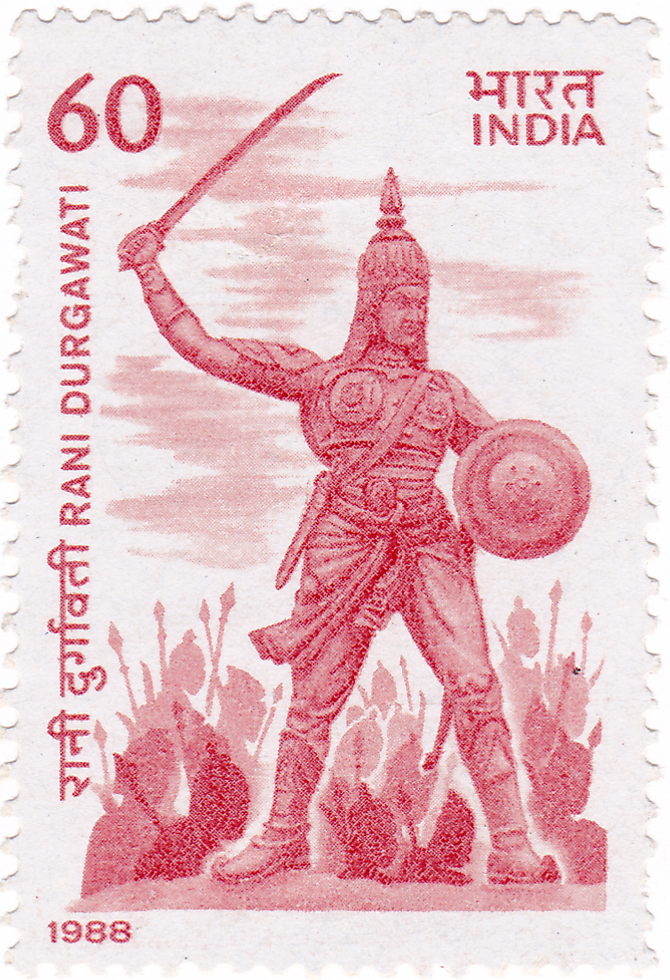
Postal stamp commemorating her death

In 1983, the government of Madhya Pradesh renamed the university of Jabalpur as Rani Durgavati Vishwavidyalaya in her memory.

The Government of India issued a postal stamp commemorating her death, on 24 June 1988.

The train between Jabalpur Junction and Jammutawi was named Durgavati Express (11449/11450) in her honor.

The Indian Coast Guard on 14 July 2018 commissioned ICGS Rani Durgavati, the third Inshore Patrol Vessel (IPV) of its kind.

== See also ==
- Tarabai
- Chand Bibi
- Kittur Chennamma
- Rani of Jhansi
- Rudrama Devi
- Rani
