= Ramnagar, Madhya Pradesh =

New Ramnagar
- Town
- Location in Madhya Pradesh, India
- Coordinates: 24.21°N 81.07°E
- Country: India
- State: Madhya Pradesh
- District: Maihar district

Population
  - Total: 133,393

Languages
  - Official: Hindi
- Time zone: UTC+5:30 (IST)
- PIN: 485881
- Nearest city: Amarpatan
- Sex ratio: 96/100 ♂/♀
- Literacy: 47.41%

New Ramnagar is a town and a nagar parishad in Madhya Pradesh state in central India. It was located on the Son River in Maihar district, approximately 60 kilometers from the city of Satna.

The town was affected by the Bansagar project. The town was completely submerged underwater and its inhabitants have been relocated to a newly developed and planned town called New Ramnagar. The inhabitants of the submerged town were provided monetary compensation and strips of land in the new town. Also, people of nearby villages such as Semariya, Dadheech Tola began building new houses in the outskirts of submerged land.

== Geography ==
Ramnagar is located on 24.21°N 81.07°E. It has an average elevation of 358 metres (1174 feet). Multiple villages surround the city. 485881 Is Pin Code of Ramnagar.

== Governance ==
Ramnagar is the location of the tehsil, and the development block, in Maihar district. It has a total of 55 gram panchayats, and 260 villages.
