= Asaf Khan I =

- Mansabdar
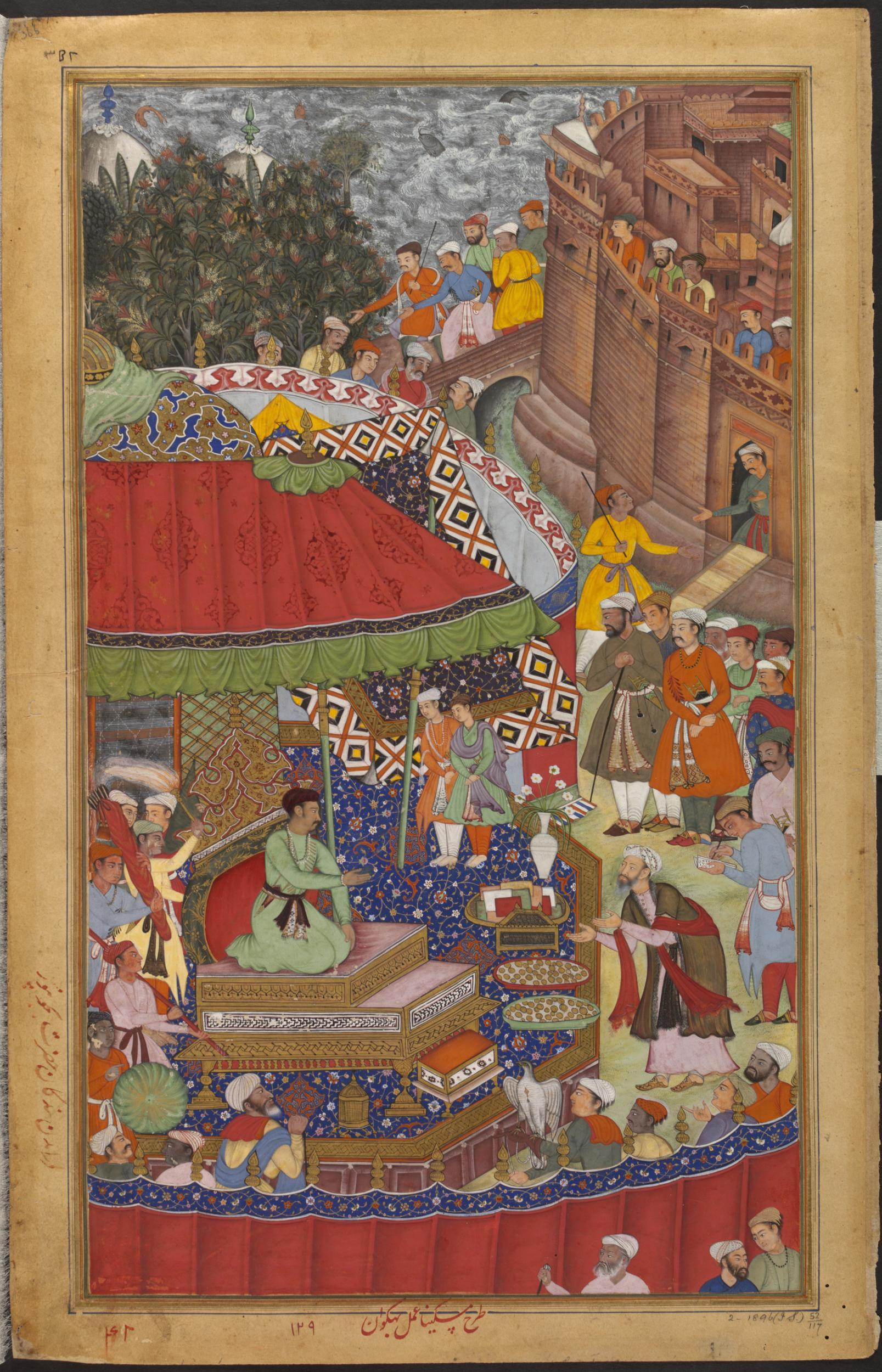
- Asaf Khan presenting spoils from the Mughal conquest of Garha to Akbar at Jaunpur in 1565.

Subahdar of Illahabad Subah
- Reign: c. 1560—c. 1580
- Religion: Sunni Islam
- Occupation: Mughal Noble
- Military career
- Died: 1611/1612 CE. Burhanpur, Mughal Empire.
- Allegiance: Mughal Empire
- Conflicts: Mughal conquest of Garha; Battle of Damoh; Siege of Chouragarh; Mughal-Rajput wars; Siege of Chittorgarh (1567-1568); Battle of Haldighati

Asaf Khan I was a Persian nobleman of the Mughal Empire during the reign of Akbar. He was governor of Ilahabad Subah and participated in many Mughal military expeditions, leading the Mughal conquest of Garha in 1564 and serving in the Battle of Haldighati in 1576.

After personally attacking Garha and keeping the loot of war, including many precious gems and 800 war elephants, to himself, he rebelled fearing retribution by Akbar and joined many disaffected Uzbek noblemen in seeking independence from Mughal rule, fleeing to his subah on 17 September 1565. However, he soon submitted and was restored to his previous post in 1567.

Asaf Khan played a pivotal role in Mughal conquest of Chittor in 1568 led by Akbar himself. After the fort was sacked in February 1568, Akbar handed it to Asaf Khan and returned to Agra.

He probably died at Burhanpur aged 63 in the seventh year of Jahangir's reign (1611–12).
