= Mandla =

- City
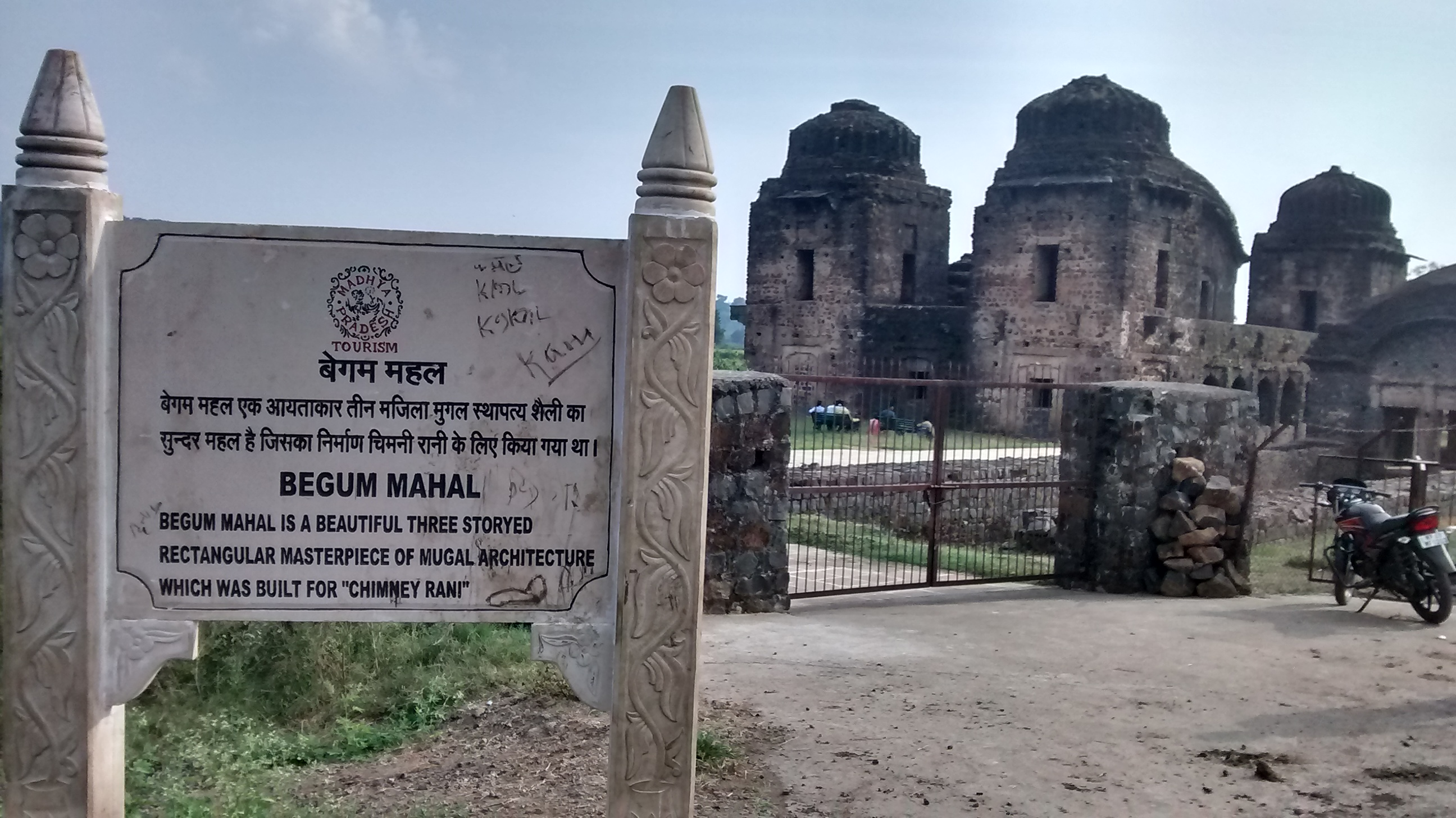
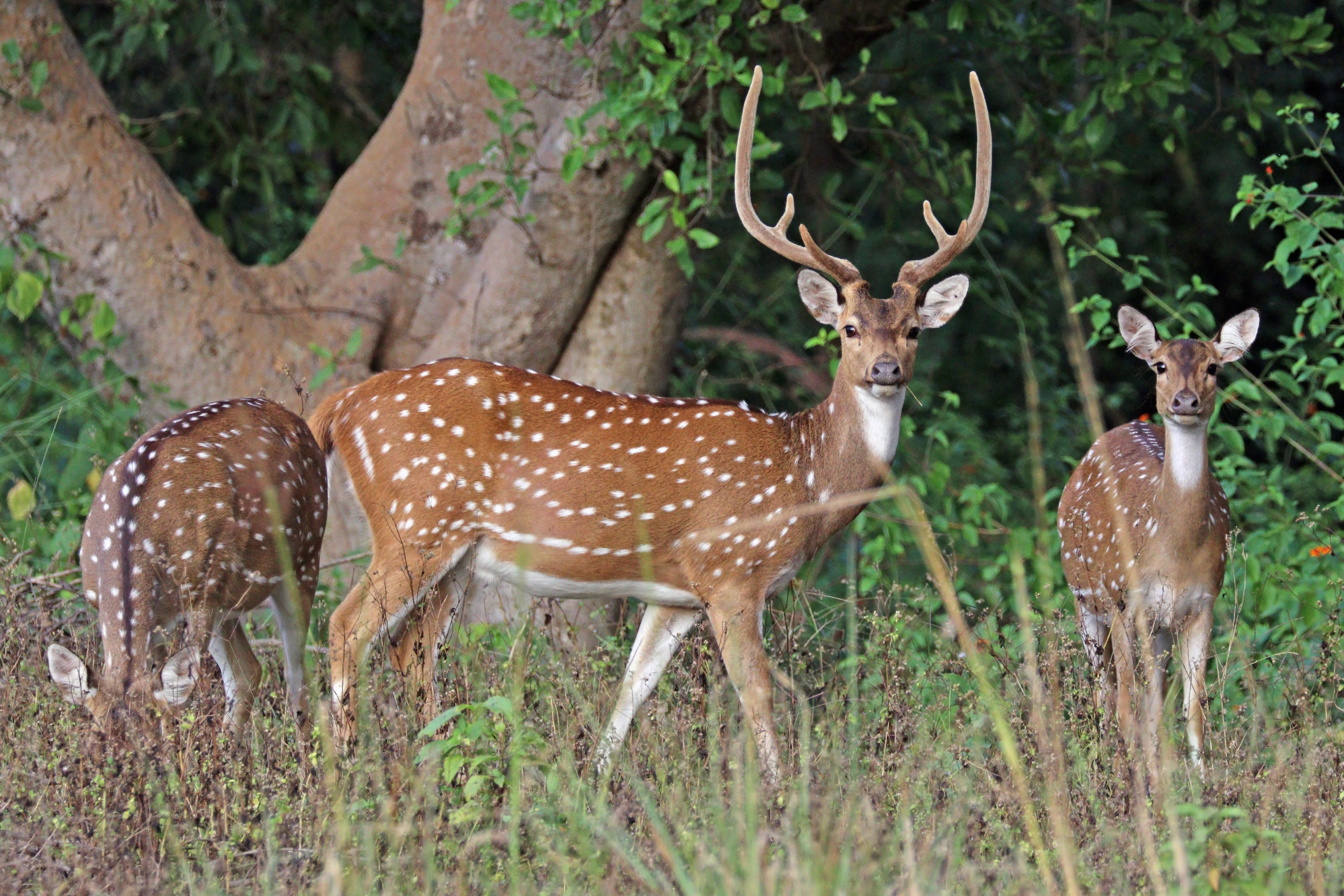
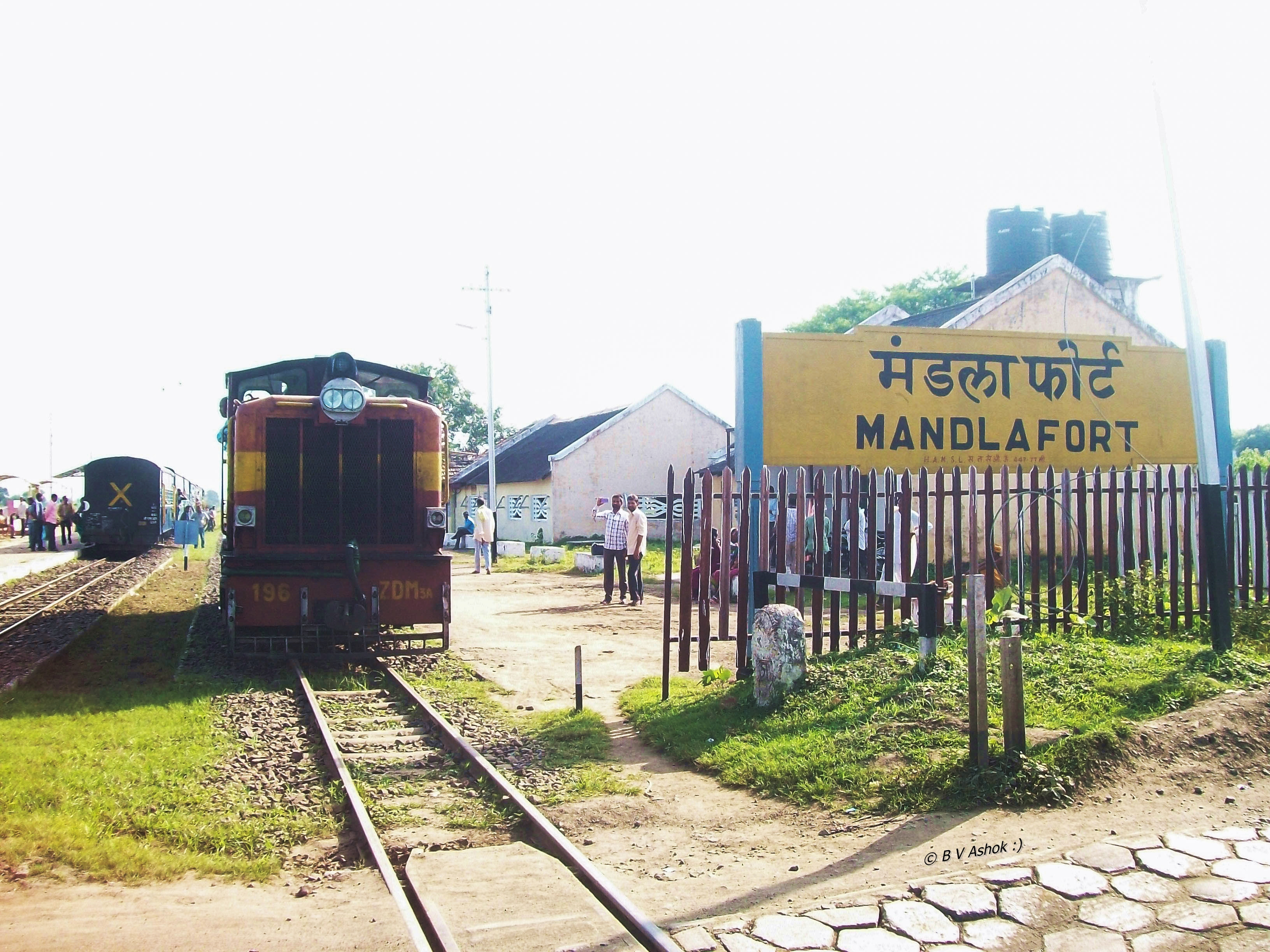
- Begam Mahal , Kanha National Park, Mandla Fort Station

- Location in Madhya Pradesh, India
- Coordinates: 22°35′52″N 80°22′17″E
- Country: India
- State: Madhya Pradesh
- District: Mandla
- Elevation: 445 m (1,460 ft)

Population (2011)
  - Total: 71,579

Languages
  - Official: Hindi
- Time zone: UTC+5:30 (IST)
- PIN: 481 661
- Vehicle registration: MP-51
- Website: mandla.nic.in

Mandla is a city with municipality in Mandla district in the Indian state of Madhya Pradesh. It is the administrative headquarters of Mandla District. The city is situated in a loop of the Narmada River, which surrounds it on three sides, and for 15 miles between Mandla and Ramnagar, Madhya Pradesh the river flows in a deep bed unbroken by rocks. The Narmada is worshiped here, and many ghats have been constructed on the banks of the river. It was a capital of the Gondwana Kingdom who built a palace and a fort, which in the absence of proper care have gone to ruins.

== History ==
Writers including Alexander Cunningham, John Faithfull Fleet, Moti Raven Kangali and Girija Shankar Agrawal identified Mandla as the location of ancient Mahishmati.

The Gond dynasty of Garha Kingdom commenced, according to an inscription in the palace of Ramnagar, in the fifth century, with the accession of Jadho Rai, an adventurer who entered the service of an old Gond king, married his daughter and succeeded him to the throne. Alexander Cunningham placed the date two centuries later in 664. The Garha-Mandla kingdom was a petty local chiefship until the accession of Raje Sangram Shah, the forty-seventh king, in 1480. This prince extended his dominions over the Narmada Valley, and possibly Bhopal, Sagar, and Damoh and most of the Satpura hill country, and left fifty-two forts or districts to his son. In addition to Mandla, Jabalpur and Garha in Jabalpur District and Ramnagar in Mandla District served at times as capitals of the kingdom.

The control of the Garha-Mandla kings over their extended principality was, however, short-lived, for in 1564 Asaf Khan, the Mughal viceroy, invaded their territories. The queen Durgavati, then acting as regent for her infant son, met him near Singorgarh fort in Damoh District; but being defeated, she retired past Garha towards Mandla, and took up a strong position in a narrow defile. Here, mounted on an elephant, she bravely headed her troops in defence of the pass, and notwithstanding that she had received an arrow-wound in her eye refused to retire. But by an extraordinary coincidence the river in the rear of her position, which had been nearly dry a few hours before the action commenced, began suddenly to rise and soon became unfordable Finding her plan of retreat thus frustrated, and seeing her troops give way, the queen snatched a dagger from her elephant-driver and plunged it into her breast. Asaf Khan acquired immense booty, including, it is said, more than a thousand elephants.

From this time the fortunes of the Mandla kingdom rapidly declined. The districts afterward formed into the state of Bhopal were ceded to the Emperor Akbar, to obtain his recognition of the next Rajja, Chandra Shah. In the time of Chandra Sah's grandson, Prem Narayan, the Bundelas invaded Narsinghpur District and stormed the castle of Chauragarh. During the succeeding reigns, family quarrels led the rival parties to solicit foreign intervention in support of their pretensions, and for this a price always had to be paid. Mandla was made capital of the kingdom in 1670. Part of Sagar District was ceded to the Mughal Emperor, the south of Sagar and Damoh districts to Chhatar Sal Raja of Panna, and Seoni District to the RajGond Raja of Deogarh.

In 1742 the Peshwa invaded Mandla, and this was followed by the exaction of chauth (tribute). The Bhonsles of Nagpur annexed the territories now constituting Balaghat District and part of Bhandara District. Finally, in 1781, the last king of the Gondwana line was deposed, and Mandla was annexed to the Maratha government of Sagar, then under the control of the Peshwa.

At some period of the Gondwana kingdom the district must have been comparatively well-populated, as numerous remains of villages could be observed in places that, by the early 20th century, were covered in forest; but one of the Sagar rulers, Vasudeo Pandit, is said to have extorted several tens of thousands of rupees from the people in 18 months by unbridled oppression, and to have left the district ruined and depopulated. In 1799 Mandla was appropriated by the Bhonsle rajas of Nagpur, in accordance with a treaty concluded some years previously with the Peshwa. The Marathas built a wall on the side of the town that was not protected by the river. During the 18 years which followed, the district was repeatedly overrun by the Pindaris, although they did not succeed in taking the town of Mandla.

In 1818, at the conclusion of the Third Anglo-Maratha War, Mandla was ceded to the British. The Maratha garrison in the fort refused to surrender, and a force under General Marshall took it by assault. Mandla and the surrounding district became part of the Saugor and Nerbudda Territories of British India. The peace of the district was not subsequently disturbed, except for a brief period during the Revolt of 1857, when the chiefs of Ramgarh, Shahpura, and Sohagpur joined the rebels, taking with them their Gond retainers. British control was restored in early 1858. The Saugor and Nerbudda Territories, including Mandla District, became part of the new Central Provinces in 1861. The town was made a municipality in 1867. The Maratha wall was removed in the early 20th century. By the first decade of the 20th century, Mandla contained an English middle school, girls' and branch schools, and a private Sanskrit school, as well as three dispensaries, including mission and police hospitals, and a veterinary dispensary. A station of the Church Missionary Society was also established there.

== Climate ==
Climate data for Mandla (1991–2020, extremes 1950–2020)
Month	Jan	Feb	Mar	Apr	May	Jun	Jul	Aug	Sep	Oct	Nov	Dec	Year
Record high °C (°F)	33.4 (92.1)	36.7 (98.1)	40.0 (104.0)	44.2 (111.6)	46.8 (116.2)	46.4 (115.5)	40.0 (104.0)	36.0 (96.8)	36.0 (96.8)	39.0 (102.2)	34.0 (93.2)	33.2 (91.8)	46.8 (116.2)
Mean daily maximum °C (°F)	26.4 (79.5)	29.9 (85.8)	34.2 (93.6)	38.4 (101.1)	41.4 (106.5)	37.1 (98.8)	30.7 (87.3)	29.4 (84.9)	30.9 (87.6)	31.8 (89.2)	29.3 (84.7)	27.2 (81.0)	32.0 (89.6)
Mean daily minimum °C (°F)	8.3 (46.9)	11.1 (52.0)	15.1 (59.2)	19.9 (67.8)	23.8 (74.8)	24.8 (76.6)	22.9 (73.2)	22.4 (72.3)	21.3 (70.3)	17.0 (62.6)	12.1 (53.8)	7.8 (46.0)	17.2 (63.0)
Record low °C (°F)	0.0 (32.0)	1.9 (35.4)	3.6 (38.5)	8.6 (47.5)	12.5 (54.5)	14.0 (57.2)	14.0 (57.2)	13.0 (55.4)	12.0 (53.6)	3.1 (37.6)	1.5 (34.7)	0.0 (32.0)	0.0 (32.0)
Average rainfall mm (inches)	26.8 (1.06)	16.1 (0.63)	27.6 (1.09)	11.5 (0.45)	10.2 (0.40)	155.6 (6.13)	380.8 (14.99)	372.6 (14.67)	136.8 (5.39)	38.3 (1.51)	11.6 (0.46)	12.4 (0.49)	1,200.6 (47.27)
Average rainy days	1.8	1.1	2.1	1.3	1.1	8.5	15.9	14.4	8.6	2.2	0.8	0.3	58.1
Average relative humidity (%) (at 17:30 IST)	51	44	37	33	29	54	78	82	76	61	58	55	56
Source: India Meteorological Department

== Demographics ==
As of 2011 India census, Mandla had a population of 71,579. Males constitute 51% of the population and females 49%. In 2011 Mandla has an average literacy rate of 68.3%, higher than the national average of 59.85%: male literacy is 79.5%, and female literacy is 57.2%. Scheduled tribes dominate the population, so there is a Special education programs to promote them. In Mandla, 13.7% of the population is under 6 years of age. 90% of the population are Hindus, 4% Christians, 5% Muslims and 1% are of other faiths.

== Politics ==
The city is represented in the Lok Sabha by the Mandla (Lok Sabha constituency). As of 2024, its representative is Faggan Singh Kulaste of the Bharatiya Janata Party.

== See also ==
- Rani Durgavati Vishwavidyalaya
