= Jabera =

Town in Madhya Pradesh, India

- Census town
- Location within Madhya Pradesh Location within India
- Coordinates: 23.55°N 79.67°E
- Country: India
- State: Madhya Pradesh
- District: damoh

Population (2011)
  - Total: 6,806

Languages
  - Official: Hindi
- Time zone: UTC+5:30 (IST)
- Postal code: 470235
- ISO 3166 code: IN-MP
- Vehicle registration: MP-34

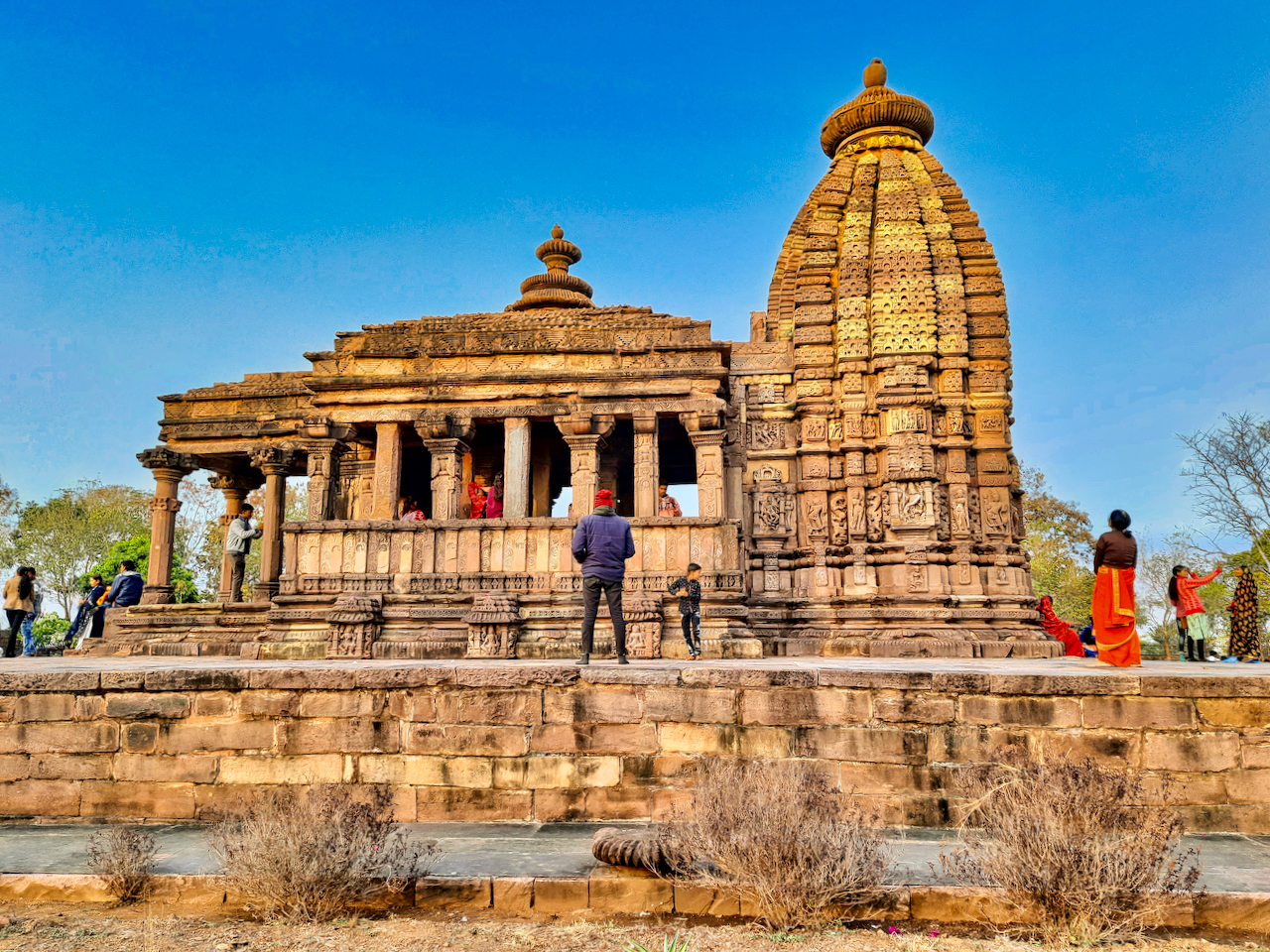
Nohleshwar Temple

Jabera is a census town city in Damoh district, Madhya Pradesh, India. Jabera is a tehsil headquarter situated on the Damoh-Jabalpur Road.

== Geography ==
Jabera is located in Vindhya Range. Dense forests are found all around here. Vyarma and Gauraiya is main rivers of Jabera.

Jabera is located at 23.55°N 79.67°E. It has an average elevation of 508 metres (1669 feet). The region is predominantly agrarian.

== Demographics ==
Jabera has population of 6,806 in 2011 which 3,581 are males while 3,225 are females. Literacy rate of Jabera city is 80.33 %; the estimated population of Jabera in 2023 is 9,200.

== Notable places ==
- Singorgarh fort, a place of historical importance
- Nohta, a historical place with a shiv temple .
- Veerangana Durgavati Wildlife Sanctuary, A Wildlife Sentury.

== Administration ==
Jabera Town has total administration over 1,650 houses to which it supplies basic amenities like water and sewerage. It is also authorize to build roads within Census Town limits and impose taxes on properties coming under its jurisdiction.

== Transportation ==
Jabera is located on Damoh-Jabalpur National Highway Road. Jabera is connected by private bus services to all nearest major cities.

== See also ==
- Jabera Assembly constituency
