= List of cities in Madhya Pradesh by population =

Madhya Pradesh is one of the largest states in India by population. Out of the total population, 72.37% lives in urban areas and 27.63% lives in rural areas. There are 416 cities in Madhya Pradesh, out of which 33 cities have a population of more than 1,00,000. There are 16 municipal corporations, 99 municipalities and the rest are municipal councils in the state.

== List ==
This is a list of urban agglomerations and cities (those not included in the urban agglomerations) with a population above 1,00,000 as per the 2011 census in the Indian state of Madhya Pradesh.

Rank	City	District	Population (2011)	CityImage
Municipal Corporations
1	Indore	Indore District	21,67,447	
2	Bhopal	Bhopal District	18,83,381	
3	Gwalior	Gwalior District	12,73,792	
4	Jabalpur	Jabalpur District	12,67,564	
5	Ujjain	Ujjain District	5,15,215	
6	Sagar	Sagar District	3,70,296	
7	Dewas	Dewas District	2,89,550	
8	Satna	Satna District	2,74,556	
9	Ratlam	Ratlam District	2,64,914	
10	Rewa	Rewa District	2,35,654	
11	Katni	Katni District	2,21,883	
12	Singrauli	Singrauli District	2,20,257	
13	Burhanpur	Burhanpur District	2,10,886	
14	Khandwa	Khandwa District	2,00,738	
15	Morena	Morena District	2,00,482	
Municipality
16	Bhind	Bhind District	1,97,585	
17	Guna	Guna District	1,80,935	
18	Shivpuri	Shivpuri District	1,79,977	
19	Chhindwara	Chhindwara District	1,75,052	
20	Vidisha	Vidisha District	1,55,951	
21	Chhatarpur	Chhatarpur District	1,42,128	
22	Mandsaur	Mandsaur District	1,41,667	
23	Damoh	Damoh District	1,39,561	
24	Neemuch	Neemuch District	1,28,561	
25	Pithampur	Dhar District	1,26,200	
26	Narmadapuram	Hoshangabad District	1,17,988	
27	Khargone	Khargone District	1,16,150	
28	Itarsi	Hoshangabad District	1,14,000	
29	Sehore	Sehore District	1,09,118	
30	Betul	Betul District	1,03,330	
31	Seoni	Seoni District	1,02,343	
32	Datia	Datia District	1,00,284	
33	Nagda	Ujjain District	1,00,039	
34	Shajapur	Shajapur District	1,00,020	

== Urban agglomeration ==
In the census of India 2011, an urban agglomeration was defined as follows:

"An urban agglomeration is a continuous urban spread constituting a town and its adjoining outgrowths (OGs), or two or more physically contiguous towns together with or without outgrowths of such towns. An Urban Agglomeration must consist of at least a statutory town and its total population (i.e. all the constituents put together) should not be less than 20,000 as per the 2001 Census. In varying local conditions, there were similar other combinations which have been treated as urban agglomerations satisfying the basic condition of contiguity."

=== Constituents of urban agglomerations in Madhya Pradesh ===
The constituents of urban agglomerations in Madhya Pradesh, with a population of 1 lakh or above, are noted below.

- Indore Urban Agglomeration includes Indore (M Corp.), Bhangarh (OG), Tigaria Badshah (OG), Nipanya (OG), Talawali Chanda (OG), Kanadia (OG), Tigaria Rao (OG), Bhicholi Mardana (OG), Palda (CT), Bank (CT), Hukmakhedi (CT), Bangarda Chhota (CT), Ahirkhedi (CT), Piplya Kumar (CT), Bangarda Bada (CT), Limbodi (CT), Lasudiya Mori (CT) and Bhicholi Hapsi (CT).
- Bhopal Urban Agglomeration includes Bhopal (M Corp.) and Kolar (M).
- Jabalpur Urban Agglomeration includes Jabalpur (M Corp.), Regwa (OG), Khairi (OG), Rachai (OG), Lamti (OG). Tilhari (OG), Kugawan (OG), Andhuwa (OG), Chhiwlaha (OG), Bhatauli (OG), Jabalpur Cantt (CB), OF Khamaria (CT), GCF Jabalpur (CT), Bilpura (CT), Vehicle Fac Area Jabalpur (CT), Suhagi (CT), Manegoan (CT), Pipariya (CT), Karmeta (CT), Amkhera (CT), Maharajpur (CT) and Madai (CT).
- Gwalior Urban Agglomeration includes Gwalior (M Corp.) and Morar Cantt (CB).
- Sagar Urban Agglomeration includes Sagar (M Corp.+OG), Sagar (M Corp.), Gaur Nagar (OG), Sagar Cantt (CB), Rajakhedi (CT), Makronia Buzurg (CT), Bhainsa (CT), and Kapuria (CT).
- Satna Urban Agglomeration includes Satna (M Corp.) and Satna Rly Colony (OG).
- Ratlam Urban Agglomeration includes Ratlam (M Corp.) and Ratlam Rly. Colony (Ratlam Kasba) (CT).
- Chhindwara Urban Agglomeration includes Chhindwara (M), Khajari (OG), Khapabhat (OG), Kukadajagat (OG), Chandangaon (OG), Seoni Pranmoti (OG), Emaliya Bohata (OG) and Lonia Karbal (CT).
- Chhatarpur Urban Agglomeration includes Chhatarpur (M), Soura (part) (OG), Bagota (part) (OG), Moraha (part) (OG) and Amanganj (CT).
- Damoh Urban Agglomeration includes Damoh (M), Imlai (OG), Singpur Damoh (OG), Chopra Ryt (OG), Chopra Khurd (OG), Dharampura (OG) and Hirdepur (CT).
- Khargone Urban Agglomeration includes Khargone (M), Sukhpuri (OG), Dhamkheda (OG), Rahimpura (OG), Aarampura (OG), Dabariya (OG), Kajalpur (OG), Khedi Buzurg (OG), Sangvi (CT) and Jaitpur (CT).
- Neemuch Urban Agglomeration includes Neemuch (M) and Rly Colony (Kumariya) (OG).
- Itarsi Urban Agglomeration includes Itarsi (M), Pathrauta (part) (OG), Bhilakhedi (CT) and Meharagaon (CT).
- Sehore Urban Agglomeration includes Sehore (M) and Sherpur (Vaisali Nagar) (part) (OG).

Abbreviations: M Corp. = Municipal corporation, M= Municipality, CT = Census town, OG= Out growth, CB = Cantonment board

== Urban agglomeration constituents ==
Urban agglomeration constituents with a population above 1,00,000 as per the 2011 census are shown in the table below.

Urban agglomeration	Name of constituent	District	Type	Population 2011	Male	Female	Population below 5 yrs	Literacy rate
Indore	Indore	Indore district	M Corp.	1,960,631	1,020,883	939,748	225,111	87.38
Bhopal	Bhopal	Bhopal district	M Corp.	1,795,648	939,560	856,088	206,967	85.24
Jabalpur	Jabalpur	Jabalpur district	M Corp.	1,054,336	546,561	507,775	107,882	90.45
Gwalior	Gwalior	Gwalior district	M Corp.	1,053,505	560,880	492,618	114,190	86.20
Sagar	Sagar	Sagar district	M Corp.	273,357	142,655	130,702	32,171	88.23
Satna	Satna	Satna district	M Corp.	280,248	147,924	132,324	31,822	86.33
Ratlam	Ratlam	Ratlam district	M Corp.	264,810	135,007	129,803	28,413	87.88
Chhindwara	Chhindwara	Chhindwara district	M Corp.	138,266	70,444	67,822	13,745	90.37
Chhatarpur	Chhatarpur	Chhatarpur district	M Corp.	133,626	70,586	63,040	16,381	84.57
Damoh	Damoh	Damoh district	M Corp.	124,979	65,133	59,846	14,712	87.10
Khargone	Khargone	Khargone district	M Corp.	106,452	54,684	61,768	13,378	82.96
Neemuch	Neemuch	Neemuch district	M Corp.	128,108	67,322	60,786	14,950	85.86
Sehore	Sehore	Sehore district	M Corp.	108,818	56,284	52,534	12,859	85.52
Gadarwara	Gadarwara	Narsinghpur district	M Corp.	105,726	53,100	52,626	11,054	77.01
