= Madhiyadoh =

Village in Madhya Pradesh, India

Madiyadoh
- Town
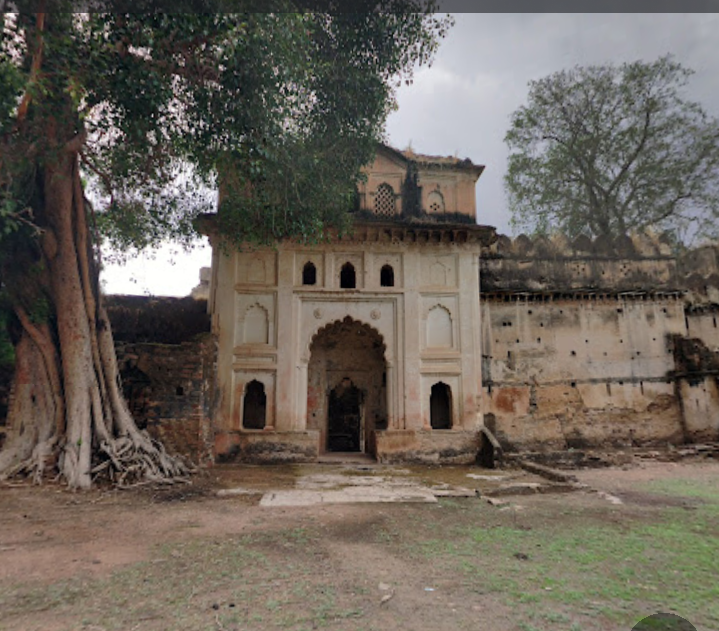

- Location in Madhya Pradesh, India
- Coordinates: 24.28°N 79.63°E

Madhiyadoh or Madiyado is a village in Hatta tehsil, Damoh district, Madhya Pradesh, India. It belongs to Sagar division.

== History ==
Madhiyadoh was one of the 52 forts of Sangram Singh. That was part of Garha Kingdom The fort and temple are situated on the banks of Sunar River in Madiyadoh.

== Geography ==
It is located 58 km north of the District headquarters Damoh, and 298 km from the state capital of Bhopal.

Madhiyadoh's pin code is 470775, and its postal head office is Hatta (Damoh).

Madhiyadoh is surrounded by Patera Tehsil towards the south, Batiyagarh and Buxwaha to the west, and Bijawar to the north. Its nearest cities are Damoh, Panna, Chhatarpur, and Murwara.

== Demographics ==
Madhiyadoh had a population of 7,923, of which 4,159 are males while 3764 are females as per the Population Census 2011.
