= Patera, Madhya Pradesh =

City in India

Patera(पटेरा)
- Town
- Location in Madhya Pradesh, India Patera(पटेरा) (India)
- Coordinates: 23.9°N 79.57°E
- Country: India
- State: Madhya Pradesh
- District: Damoh

Government
  - Type: Nagar Parishad

Population (2011)
  - Total: 9,927

Languages
  - Official: Hindi
- Time zone: UTC+5:30 (IST)
- PIN: 470772
- ISO 3166 code: IN-MP
- Vehicle registration: MP 34

Patera is a city and a tahsil in the Damoh district of Madhya Pradesh, India.

Patera is famous for kundalpur Jain temples. Kundalpur is 3.5 km away from Patera.

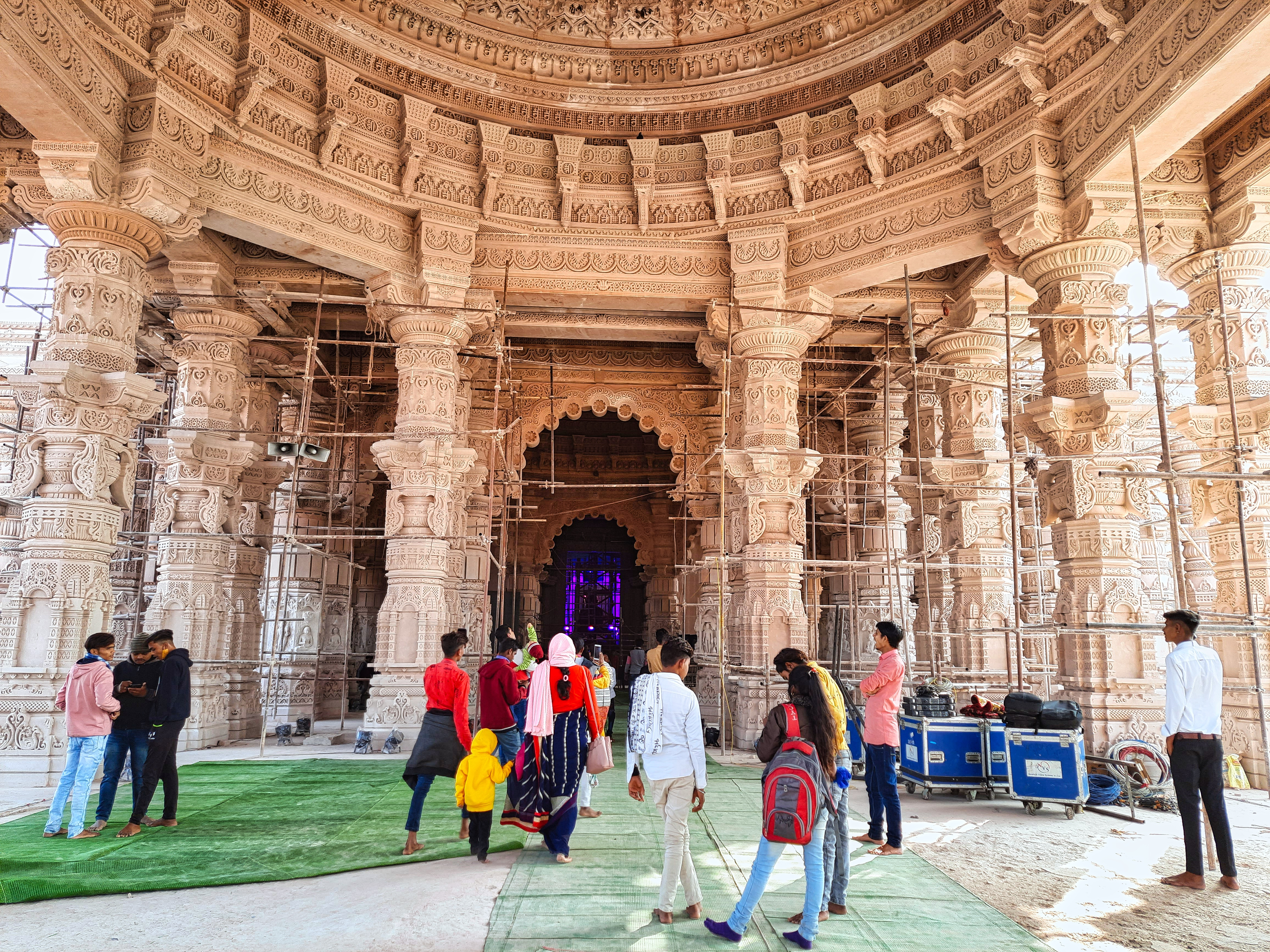
Kundalpur

== Demographics ==
According to the 2011 census, Patera has population 9,927. The literacy rate was 72.62%.

== Transportation ==
Patera is well connected by roads. Daily bus service available in Patera. It's 32 km away from Damoh, 120 km away from Sagar, 17 km away from Hatta.
