= Veerangana Durgavati Wildlife Sanctuary =

Wildlife sanctuary in Madhya Pradesh, India

- IUCN category IV (habitat/species management area)
- Location within Madhya Pradesh Location within India
- Interactive map of Veerangana Durgavati Wildlife Sanctuary
- Location: Damoh district and Sagar district, Madhya Pradesh, India
- Nearest city: Damoh
- Coordinates: 23°32′49″N 79°43′43″E
- Area: 2,339.12 km^{2} (903.14 sq mi)
- Established: 1996 (Wildlife Sanctuary); 2023 ( Tiger Reserve)
- Governing body: Ministry of Environment, Forest and Climate Change, Madhya Pradesh Forest Department

Veerangana Durgawati Wildlife Sanctuary is a wildlife sanctuary in Damoh district and Sagar district of Madhya Pradesh, India. It was declared as a wildlife sanctuary in 1996. In 2023, it was declared as a tiger reserve with a total area of 2,339.12 square kilometres (903.14 sq mi).

== Geography ==
It is located in Damoh district of Madhya Pradesh. It was declared as a wildlife sanctuary in 1996 and a tiger reserve in 2023. It covers a total area of 2,339.12 square kilometres (903.14 square miles), comprising 1,414 square kilometres (546 square miles) of core area and 925.120 square kilometres (357.191 square miles) of buffer area. It is named after Rani Durgavati. The sanctuary has a varied landscape consisting of hills, valleys and plains with several streams flowing through them.

== Flora ==
The vegetation is predominantly tropical mixed dry deciduous forest and some teak forests with trees accounting for 70 of the 121 species of plants found here. Pterocarpus marsupium, Terminalia alata, Anogeissus latifolia, Madhuca indica, Butea monosperma and Lagerstroemia parviflora are the most common trees in the sanctuary. The Singorgarh fort are located within the sanctuary.

== Fauna ==
The sanctuary hosts 18 species of mammals, including the leopard, wolf, jackal, Indian fox, the striped hyena and sloth bear , the reintroduced Cheetah besides several species of deer. Besides these, the sanctuary is also home to 177 species of birds, 16 species of fish and reptiles and 10 species of amphibians.
