= Bade Baba Temple =

Jain temple in Madhya Pradesh, India

Bade Baba Temple, Kundalpur
- Kundalgiri, Kundalpur
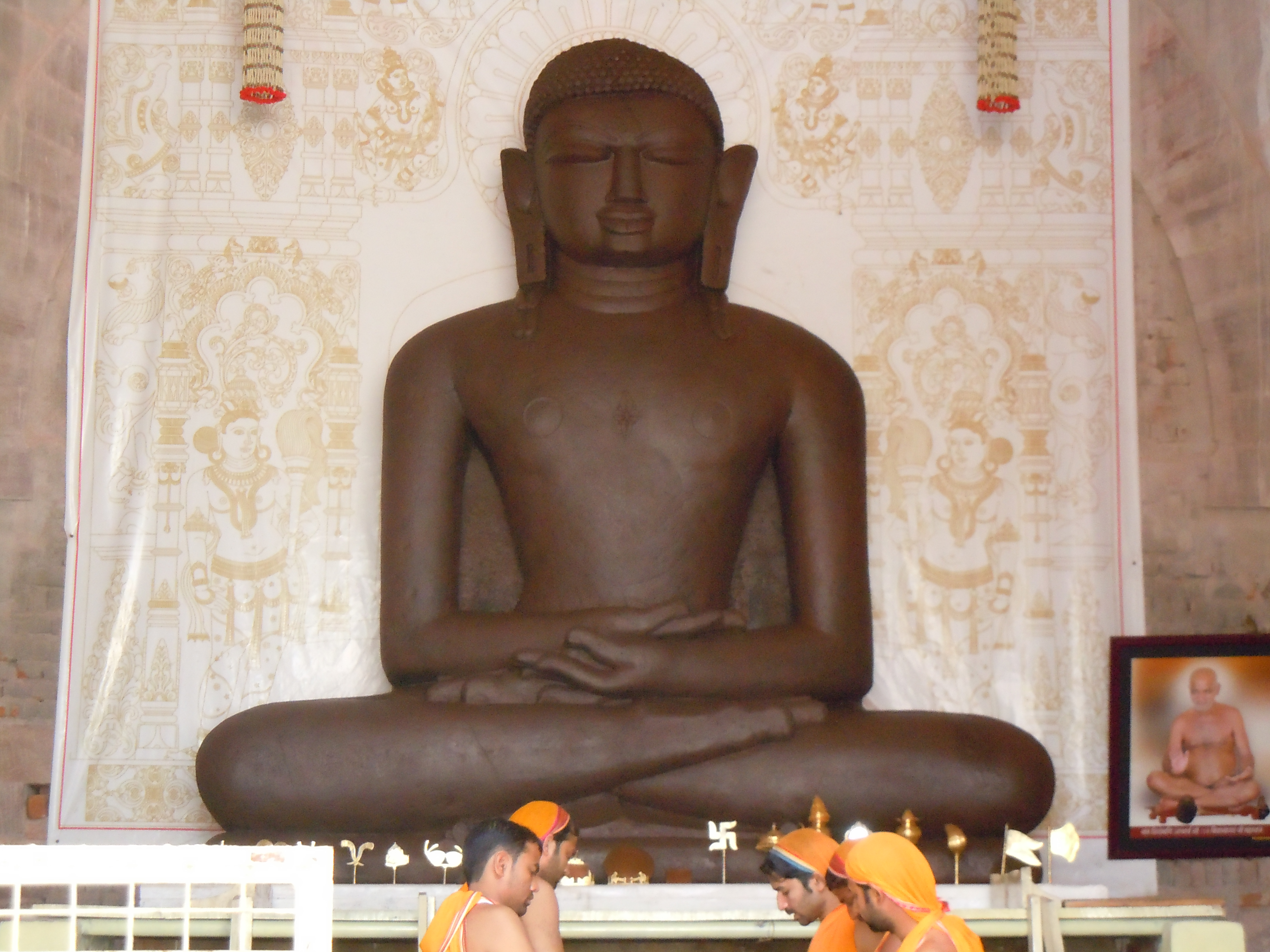
- The famous "Bade Baba" idol inside temple

- Location in Madhya Pradesh

Religion
- Affiliation: Jainism
- Sect: Digambara
- Deity: Rishabhanatha
- Festival: Mahavir Jayanti
- Governing body: Shri Digambar Jain Atishay Kshestra Kundalpur Public Trust

Location
- Location: Kundalpur, Damoh, Madhya Pradesh
- Interactive map of Bade Baba Temple, Kundalpur
- Coordinates: 23°58′47.934″N 79°43′27.116″E

Architecture
- Style: Nagara architecture
- Established: 1997
- Completed: Under construction

Specifications
- Temple: 1
- Monument: 1
- Inscriptions: Stone
- Elevation: 550 m (1,804 ft)

Website
- shreebadebaba.com

Bade Baba Temple, Kundalpur is a temple in Kundalpur, a pilgrimage town for Jains, in Damoh district of Madhya Pradesh. It is 35 km from Damoh. The Bade Baba Temple was formally known as Shri Digamber Jain Siddha Kshetra Kundalpur.

== History ==
The Bade Baba Temple is the oldest temple at Kundalpur. The original was erected during the eighth century, while the idol it houses dates back to the post-Gupta period. According to an inscription of Vikram Samvat 1757, the temple was re-discovered by Bhattaraka Surendrakirti of Mulasangha-Balatkaragana-Sarasvati Gachchha and was rebuilt from ruins by his disciple, with assistance from Bundela ruler Chhatrasal.

The construction of the temple was started in 1997 under the guidance of Acharya Vidyasagar, and the statue of Rishabhanatha, popularly known as Bade Baba, was transferred to a new temple under construction on 17 January 2006.

== Architecture ==
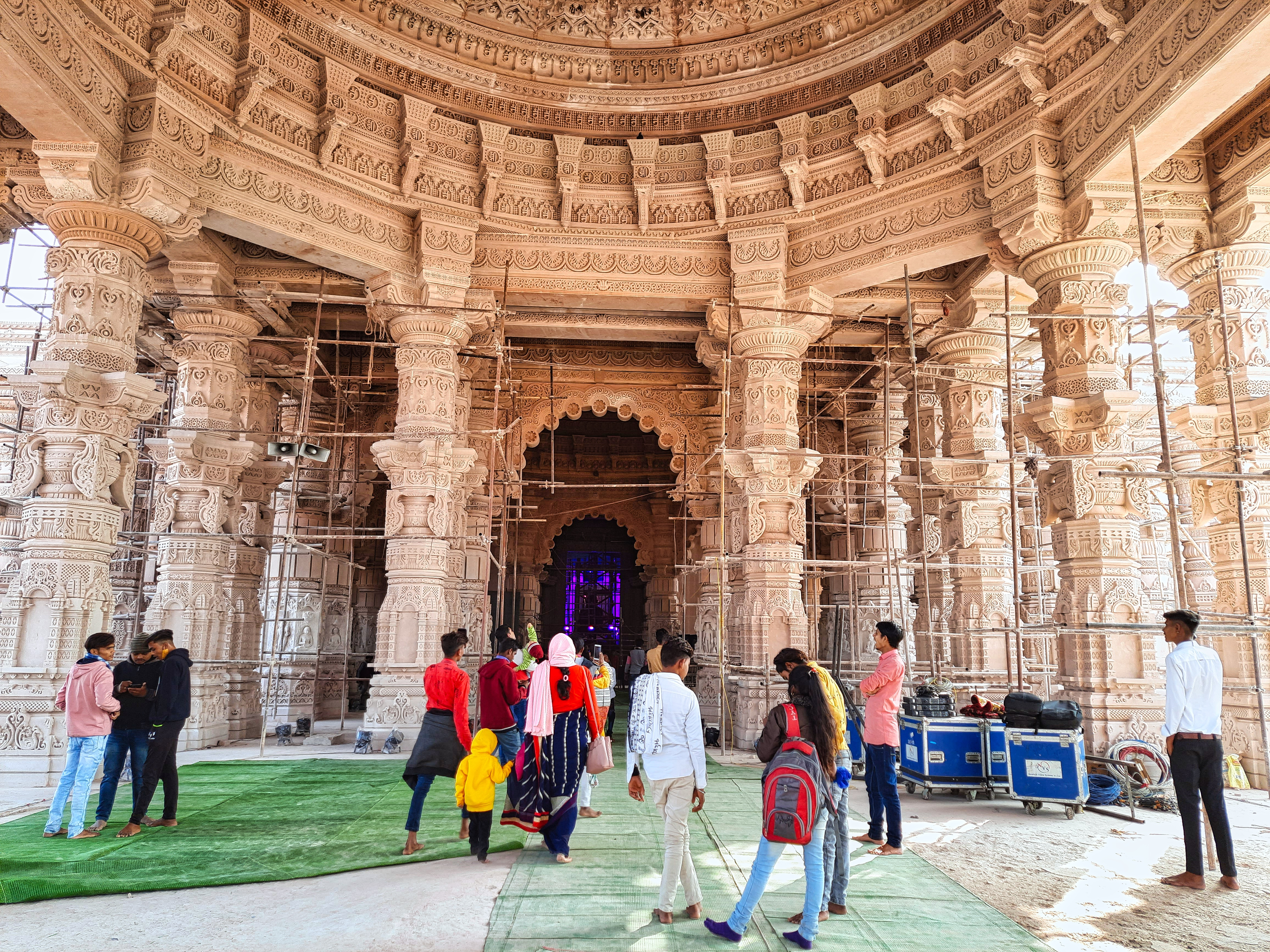
Intricately carved entrance

Construction of a massive new Bade Baba Temple began in 1999. The statue of Adinath was transferred to the sanctum of the new structure on 15 January 2006. The new temple is in the classical Nagara style, with some elements of modern Rajasthani architecture. The Indian Jain monk Acharya Vidyasagar was a principal source of inspiration for the construction of the new main temple and some other structures at Kundalpur. He is often referred to as "Chhote Baba" in relation to the Bade Baba image.

The new Bade Baba Temple, which is in the Nagara architectural style and is now approaching completion, will be 189 feet tall, making it the tallest Jain temple in the world. It uses four times the amount of stone as the Swaminarayan Akshardham. The statue of Bade Baba (Lord Adinath) was transferred to the new temple on 17 January 2006. The transfer was a dramatic event involving a confrontation between the district administration and the Jain community that was peacefully resolved. The transfer is described in the lyrical composition Purudev Stavan by Aryaka Mridumati Mata, and in a book by Suresh Jain Saral, and also in a book by Chief Minister of Madhya Pradesh Shivraj Singh Chouhan.

A Grand Consecration ceremony was held at the Bade Baba Temple in 2001 and again in 2016, guided by Acharya Shri Vidyasagarji Maharaj. A Panch Kalyanaka Pratishtha Mahotsava festival was held from 16 to 23 February 2022. On the final day, a gajarath pheri was organized, which included 24 rathas circumambulating a 900-meter oval track. The function was attended by some 500,000 individuals, including 284 monks and nuns, Chief Minister of Madhya Pradesh Shivraj Singh Chouhan, Minister of Civil Aviation Jyotiraditya Scindia, the former chief minister Kamal Nath, Speaker of the Lok Sabha Om Birla and the Minister of Textiles Piyush Goyal. A total of 2633 images were consecrated, and a four-kilometer area around Kundalpur was declared a sacred zone.

The temple is built in Nagara style. The temple plan features a garbhagriha, gūḍhamaṇḍapa, nrityamandapa, and a 90 feet (27 m) sahastrakuta jinalaya. Upon completion, the temple will be encircled by water.

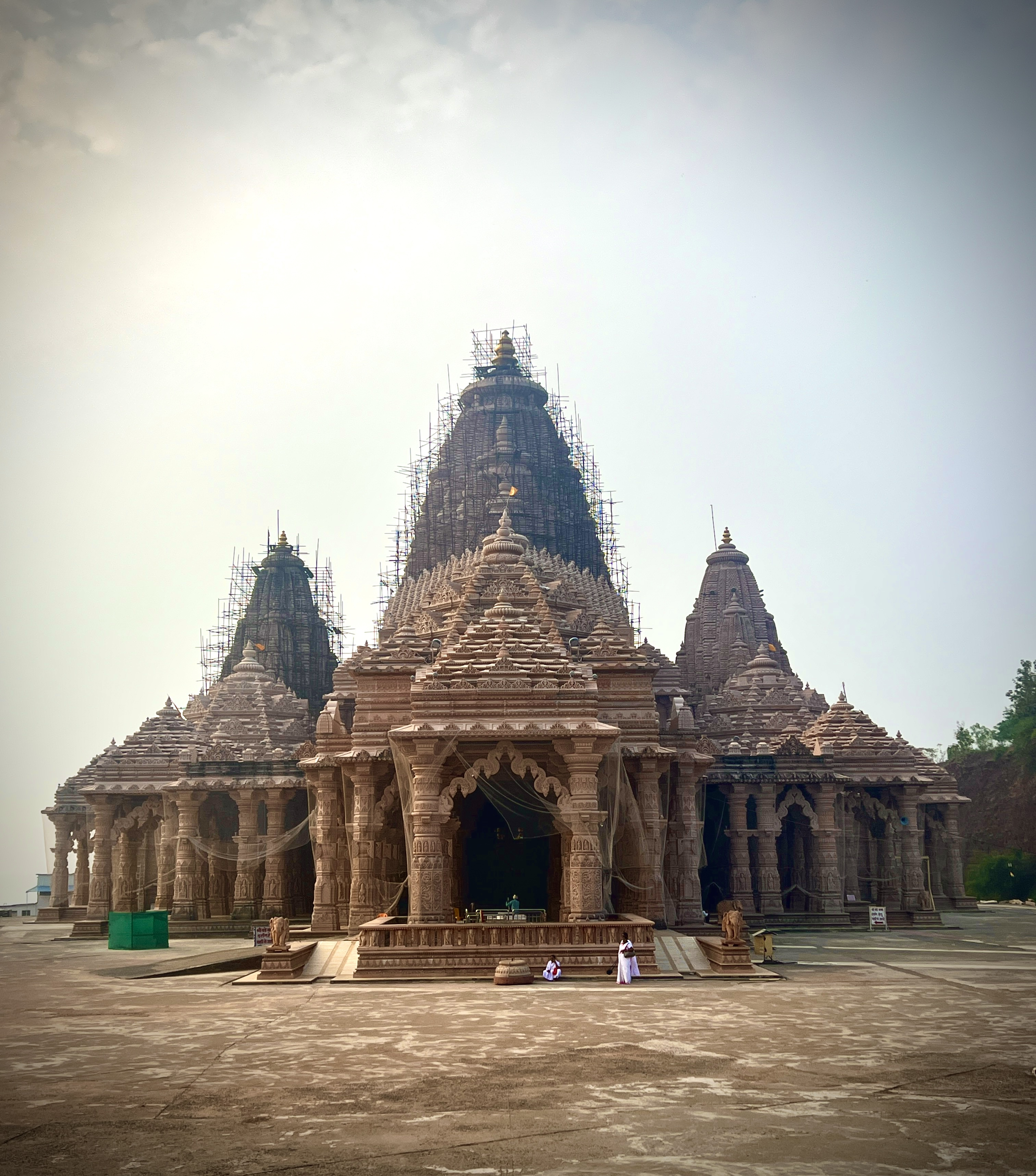
The temple of bade baba

== About temple ==
The ancient idol of Jain (24 Tirthankars) Pratham Tirthankar "1008 Shri Shri Adinath Bhagwan" (Bade Baba) situated there with world class temple structure. Popularly known as "Vishava ka Sabse Bada mandir ji" constructed under the guidance and blessings of Acharya Vidyasagar.

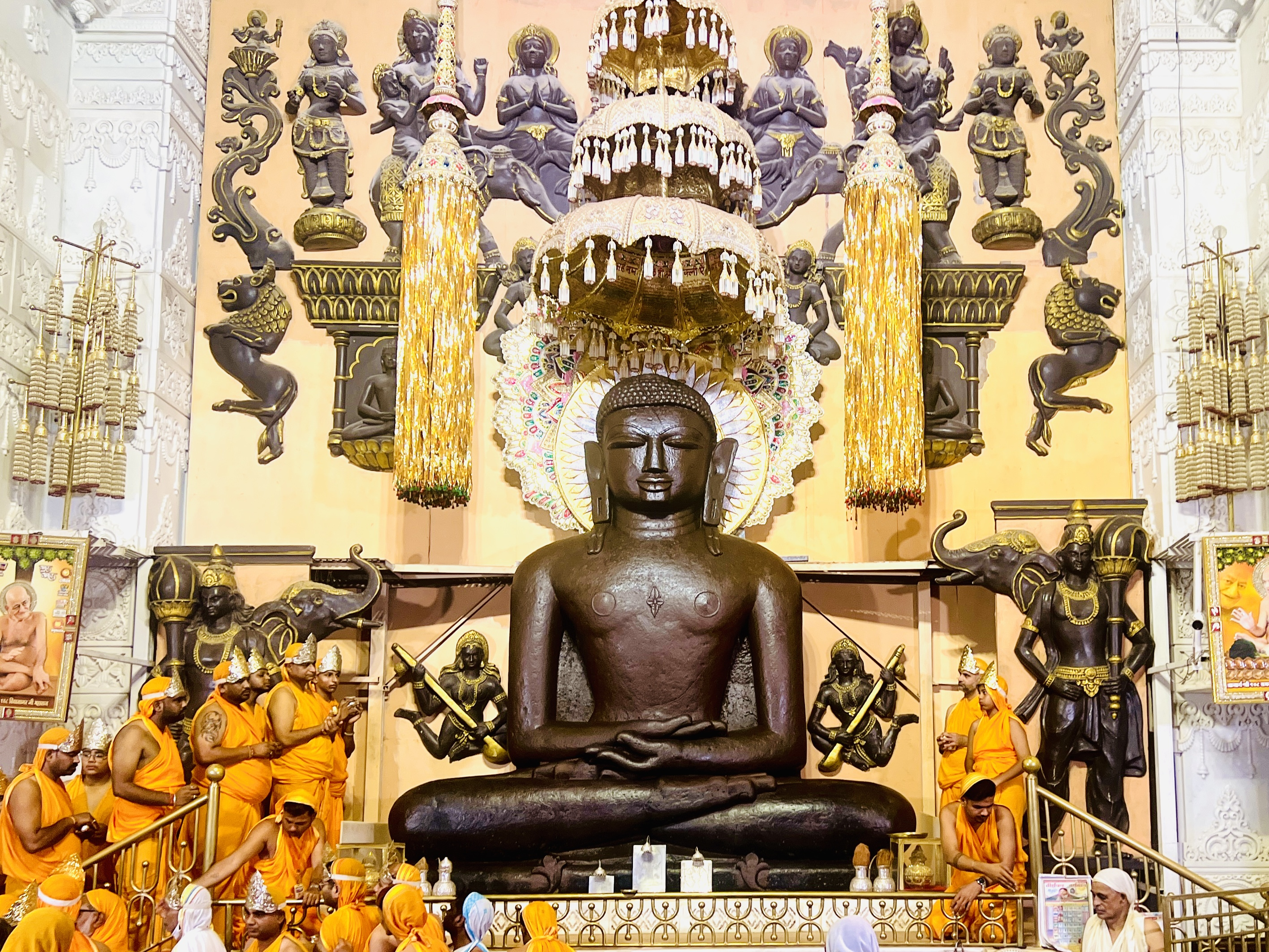
Abhishek at bade baba temple

== Kundalpur Maha Mahotsav ==
In 2022, Panch Kalyanaka Mahotsav and Mahamastakabhisheka of the idol of Rishabhanatha was organized. A total of 2007 idols were installed during the ceremony. The ceremony attracted a gathering of 1.5 million devotees.
