= Shubha Tiwari =

Indian academic (born 1968)

Prof. Shubha Tiwari
- Citizenship: Indian
- Education: MA, Ph.D.
- Occupations: Academic, Professor
- Employer: Maharaja Chhatrasal Bundelkhand University
- Title: Vice Chancellor, Maharaja Chhatrasal Bundelkhand University

Shubha Tiwari is an Indian academic and professor in English.

== Early life and education ==
Shubha Tiwari was born on 28 July 1968. She completed her bachelor's degree in arts (BA) (1986), MA (1988) and Ph.D. (1992) from Awadhesh Pratap Singh University.

== Career ==
She is currently serving as the Vice- Chancellor of Maharaja Chhatrasal Bundelkhand University, Chhatarpur, Madhya Pradesh, India.

Previously, she was the professor and the head of the English department at Awadhesh Pratap Singh University, Rewa.

She has authored two books and edited ten books.

== Selected works ==
=== As author ===
- AmitavGhosh: A Critical Study (2003, Atlantic), and The Plays of T.S. Eliot (2007, Atlantic).

=== As editor ===
- Critical Responses To Anita Desai (2003, Atlantic Publishers and Distributors) ISBN 978-81-269-0341-2 (Vol.I), ISBN 978-81-269-0342-9 (Vol. II)
- Indian Fiction in English Translation (2005, Atlantic, ISBN 978-81-269-0450-1)
- Education in India, A Multi Volume Series (Volume 1 to Volume 6, Atlantic, ISBN 978-81-269-0529-4)
- Children and Literature (2005, Atlantic, ISBN 978-81-269-0583-6)
- Contemporary Indian Dramatists (2007, Atlantic, ISBN 978-81-269-0871-4)
