= Hatta, Madhya Pradesh =

Hatta
- Tehsil
- Location in Madhya Pradesh, India Hatta (India)
- Coordinates: 24.128112°N 79.597836°E
- Country: India
- State: Madhya Pradesh
- District: Damoh District

Government
  - MLA: Ms PL Tantway(BJP)
- Elevation: 393 m (1,289 ft)

Population (2011)
  - Total: 32,465

Languages
  - Official: Bundelkhandi
- Time zone: UTC+5:30 (IST)
- PIN: 470775
- Telephone code: 07604
- ISO 3166 code: IN-MP
- Vehicle registration: MP 34 34

Hatta is the biggest Tehsil in Damoh district in the state of Madhya Pradesh, India. It is also headquarters of Hatta Tehsil.

== Villages ==
There are more than 600 villages in this tehsil. Due to many temples at the riverside, this place is known as Upkashi. This is a nature-rich town of the Damoh district. The Sunar River is the lifeline of Hatta. The town has been the part of Gondwana Empire, and King Hatteshah established this town. The buildings of Gondwana Kingdom are still present all over its boundaries. Independence activist Premchand Singhai hails from Hatta. The temples of Gourishankar ji and Maa chandi ji are the pilgrims of hatta. Two market bazariya and bada bajar are the main markets for jewelry, vegetables, Kirana, and agriculture marketing for villagers.

== Geography ==
The village is located at 24°12′N 79°59′E. It is about 40 km north of Damoh on the banks of river Sunar.

== Demographics ==
As of 2011 India census, Hatta had a population of 32,465. Males constitute 52.7% of the population and females 47.3%. Hatta has an average literacy rate of 84.74%, higher than the national average of 74.04%: male literacy is 90.75%, and female literacy is 78.03%. In Hatta, 13.06% of the population is under 6 years of age.

== Education ==
Some of the higher secondary (class 6 to 12) schools in Hatta are:

- Kendriya Vidyalaya Sangathan, Hatta (Co-ed) (Start 17 Oct 2017)
- Jawahar Navodaya Vidyalaya, Hatta (Co-ed, Residential)
- Govt Navghat High School (Boys & Girls) {English Medium}
- Govt Naveen Higher Secondary School (Boys' School)
- Govt Maharani Laxmi Bai Girls Higher secondary School (Girls' school)
- Govt Multipurpose Higher Secondary School of excellence (Co-ed school)
- Saraswati Shishu Mandir Hatta (Co-ed, Hindu Cultural School & best to learn manner)
- Mahaveer Saraswati Shishu Mandir
- Swami Vivekananda Saraswati Shishu Mandir, (Hatta)
- GS convent higher secondary school (English medium)
- Little Drops Public School (hatta) (co-ed School)
- Keshav Public School (Hatta)
- New Bundel Khand Public School (both girls and boys) {high secondary school} English medium.
- Gurukul English medium school (hatta) (co-ed school)
- Royal Convert School Hatta (English medium).

Educational institutions includes one district level educational diploma institute.

- District Institute of Educational Training

There is one degree college in Hatta.

- Govt Kunwar Raghwendra Singh Hazari degree College, also known as Govt Degree College, offers graduate degree courses in B.A., B.Sc. and B.Com. The college is part of Maharaja Chhatrasal Bundelkhand University
- Swami Vivekanand B-ED College near Civil Hospital Hatta
- Swami Vivekanand College Hatta Damoh road Hatta
- Bundelkhand Career College, Hatta

== See also ==
- Madhiyadoh
