= MCBU =

MCBU may refer to:

- Maharaja Chhatrasal Bundelkhand University, state university in Chhatarpur, Madhya Pradesh, India
- Manisa Celal Bayar University, public research university in Manisa, Turkey
