= Bansatar Kheda =

- city
- Location in Madhya Pradesh, India Bansatar Kheda (India)
- Coordinates: 23°47′31″N 79°20′24″E
- Country: India
- State: Madhya Pradesh
- District: Damoh

Population (2001)
  - Total: 5,032

Languages
  - Official: Hindi
- Time zone: UTC+5:30 (IST)
- Postal code: 470672
- ISO 3166 code: IN-MP
- Vehicle registration: MP

Bansatar Kheda is a census town in Damoh district in the state of Madhya Pradesh, India.

== Demographics ==
As of 2001 India census, Bansatar Kheda had a population of 5,032. Males constitute 53% of the population and females 47%. Bansatar Kheda has an average literacy rate of 66%, higher than the national average of 59.5%; with 61% of the males and 39% of females literate. 16% of the population is under 6 years of age.
