= Batiyagarh =

- Town
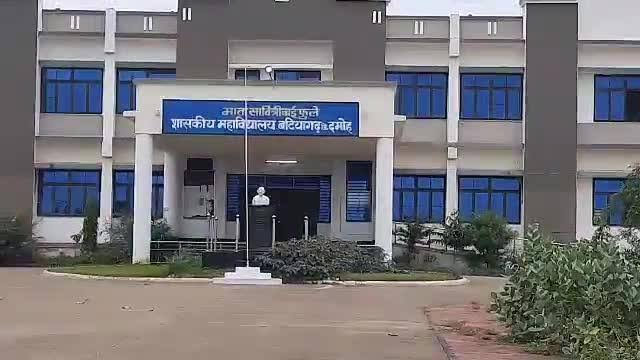

- Location in Madhya Pradesh, India Batiyagarh (India)
- Coordinates: 24.11°N 79.34°E
- Country: India
- State: Madhya Pradesh
- District: Damoh

Population (2011)
  - Total: 8,951

Languages
  - Official: Hindi
- Time zone: UTC+5:30 (IST)
- PIN Code: 470676
- ISO 3166 code: IN-MP
- Vehicle registration: MP-34

Batiyagarh is a town in the Damoh district of Madhya Pradesh in central India. It is also a tehsil headquarter.

== Geography ==
Batiyagarh is in the northern part of the district, located on NH 34, and 35 km away from district headquarter, on the banks of Judi River.

== Demographics ==
In 2011, Batiyagarh had a population of 8,951 of which 4728 were male and 4223 were female. Batiyagarh has a higher literacy rate compared to the rest Madhya Pradesh; in 2011, Batiyagarh had a 74.69% literacy rate, compared to 69.32% in Madhya Pradesh on average.

== Transportation ==
Batiyagarh is well connected with roads. It's 35 km away from Damoh. Daily Bus service available from here. Nearby Railway Station is Damoh.

== See also ==
- Damoh District
- Pathariya Assembly constituency
