= Rajakhedi =

Town in Sagar district, Madhya Pradesh, India

- city
- Location in Madhya Pradesh, India Rajakhedi (India)
- Coordinates: 23°51′32″N 78°48′3″E
- Country: India
- State: Madhya Pradesh
- District: Sagar

Population (2001)
  - Total: 19,023

Languages
  - Official: Hindi
- Time zone: UTC+5:30 (IST)
- ISO 3166 code: IN-MP
- Vehicle registration: MP

Rajakhedi is a census town in Sagar district in the Indian state of Madhya Pradesh.

== Demographics ==
At the 2001 India census, Rajakhedi had a population of 19,023. Males constituted 53% of the population and females 47%. Rajakhedi had an average literacy rate of 73%, higher than the national average of 59.5%: male literacy was 79%, and female literacy 67%. 15% of the population was under 6 years of age. Rajakhedi was once the largest gram panchayat in India.
