= Kundalpur, Madhya Pradesh =

Town in Madhya Pradesh, India

Kundalpur Atishay Kshetra, Kundalgiri
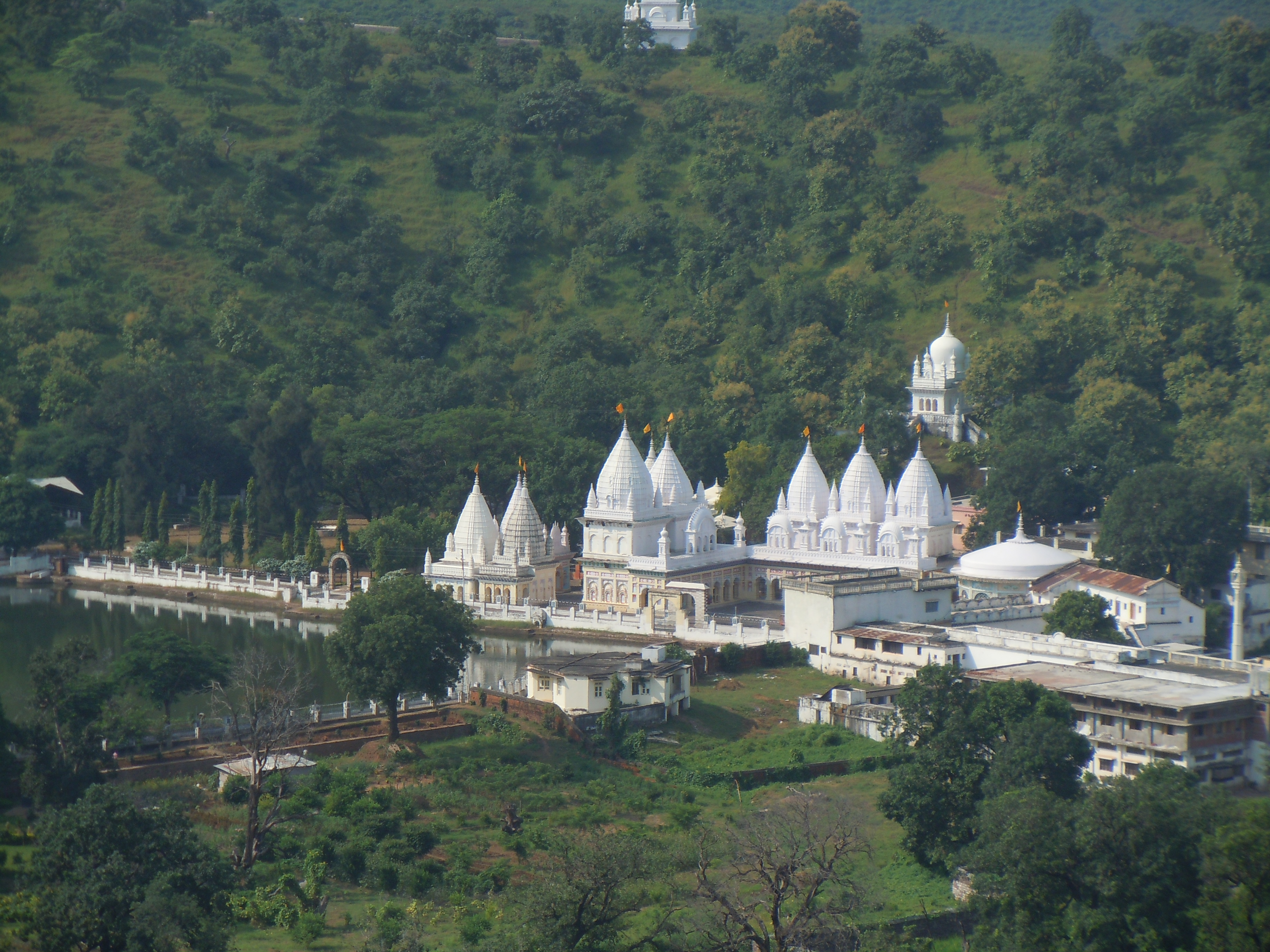
- Jain Temples near Vardhman Lake Kundalpur

- Location within Madhya Pradesh

Religion
- Affiliation: Jainism
- Deity: Rishabhanatha
- Festival: Mahavir Janma Kalyanak
- Governing body: Shri Digamber Jain Siddha Kshetra Kundalgiri Prabandhakarini Samiti

Location
- Location: Damoh district, Madhya Pradesh
- Interactive map of Kundalpur Atishay Kshetra, Kundalgiri
- Coordinates: 23.984944°N 79.719957°E

Architecture
- Established: 8th century
- Completed: 10th century
- Temple: 63

Website
- www.shreebadebaba.com

Kundalpur is a town located in Damoh district in the Indian state of Madhya Pradesh. Located 37 kilometres (23 miles) northeast of the city of Damoh, Kundalpur is a pilgrimage site for Digambar Jains.

== Location ==
Nearby cities include Damoh 37 kilometres (23 miles), Sagar 113 kilometres (70 miles), and Jabalpur 143 kilometres (89 miles). The nearest railway station is located at Damoh, and the nearest airport is Jabalpur Airport.

== Annual fair ==
The Kundalpur Fair takes place in the month of March, beginning with the annual gathering of Jains, immediately after the Festival of Colours, and lasts for two weeks.

== Architecture ==
There is a large statue of Rishabhanatha (also known as "Bade Baba" and "Adinath") on top of the hill in Kundalpur. The statue, seated in the lotus position, is 15 feet in height and is on a 3-foot high pedestal. It is flanked on both sides by Parshvanatha images of the same height. The statue was incorrectly identified in 1878 by Joseph David Beglar, who noted the inscription mounted on the wall, as of Neminatha. The statue was again incorrectly identified in 1884 by Alexander Cunningham as an image of Mahavira. Niraj Jain established that the statue is in fact of Rishabhanatha. This is also the place of salvation of the last Kevali, named Shridhar Kevali. Photographs of the Bade Baba statue have been widely used in many publications, calendars, and posters.

Among all the temples of Kundalpur, the most famous is the Bade Baba temple, with Rishabhanatha (affectionately termed "Bade Baba") as the principal deity. Another temple — called Jal Mandir — is situated in the middle of Vardhamana pond, at the foot of the hill. A Samosharana temple was built that commemorated the 25th anniversary of the parinirvana of Lord Mahavira in 1974. A manastambha in the center of the dharmashala was constructed in 1975.

== History ==
According to Alexander Cunningham, in 1884 there were 20 temples on the hill and 30 temples at the foot of the hill near the pond known as "Vardhamana Talao". The temples are square blocks with dome roofs and pinnacles of different sizes.

The original Bade Baba temple, estimated to date from the 6th century CE, was the oldest temple at Kundalpur. It included smaller shrines and temples, and was enclosed within a fortified compound with tall rubble masonry walls on top of the hill. The main garbhagrih contained the Bade Baba pratima which along with its parikar (including the Parshvanth images) occupied the entire back wall. According to an inscription in the temple, the temple was renovated by the disciples of Bhattaraka Surendrakirti, with assistance from Bundela ruler Chhatrasal. The 4th line of the inscription — which is dated 31 December 1700 CE — mentions the name of Mahavira, and line 8 mentions the terms Jina Marga (the "path to liberation") and Jinadharma.

== Photo gallery ==
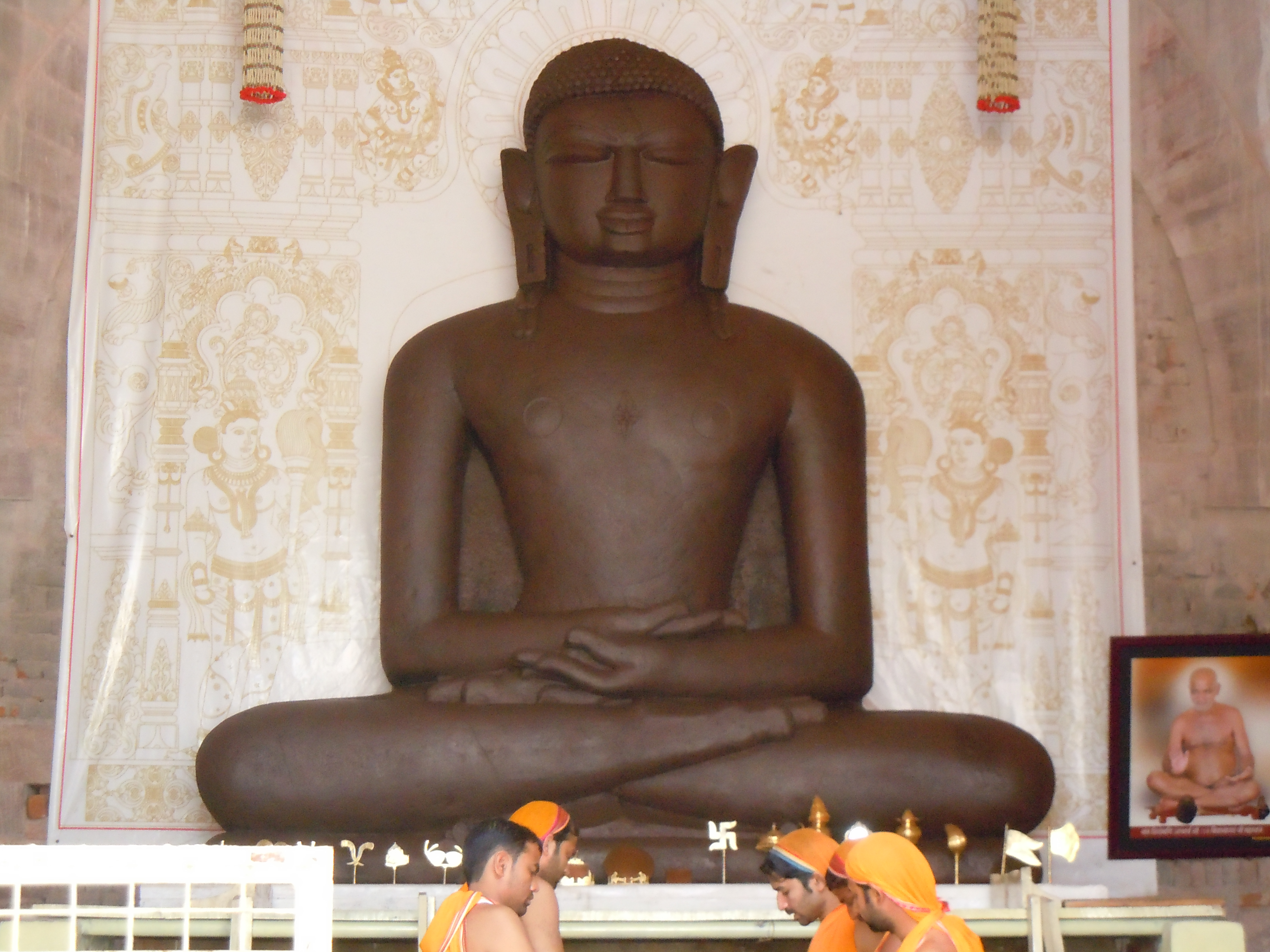
Famous 15 feet Image of "Bade Baba" (Rishabhanatha) at Kundalpur

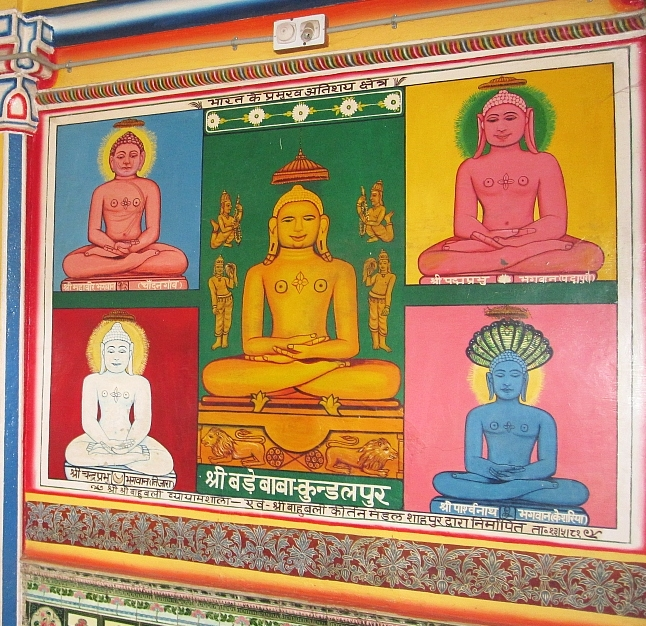
A mural at Shahpur representing the Bade Baba pratima with parikar in the old temple (center)

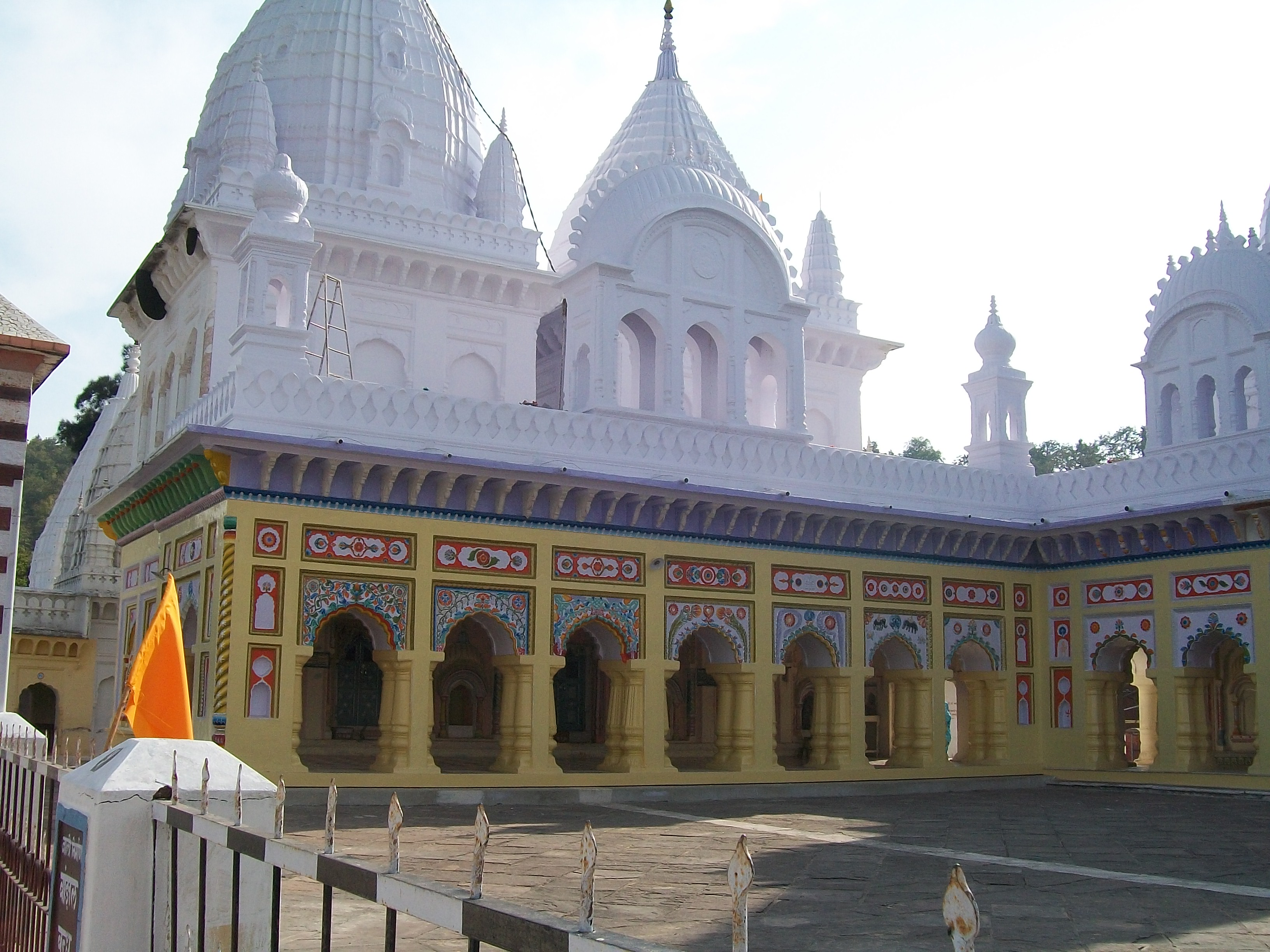
Temple below hill, 19th century.

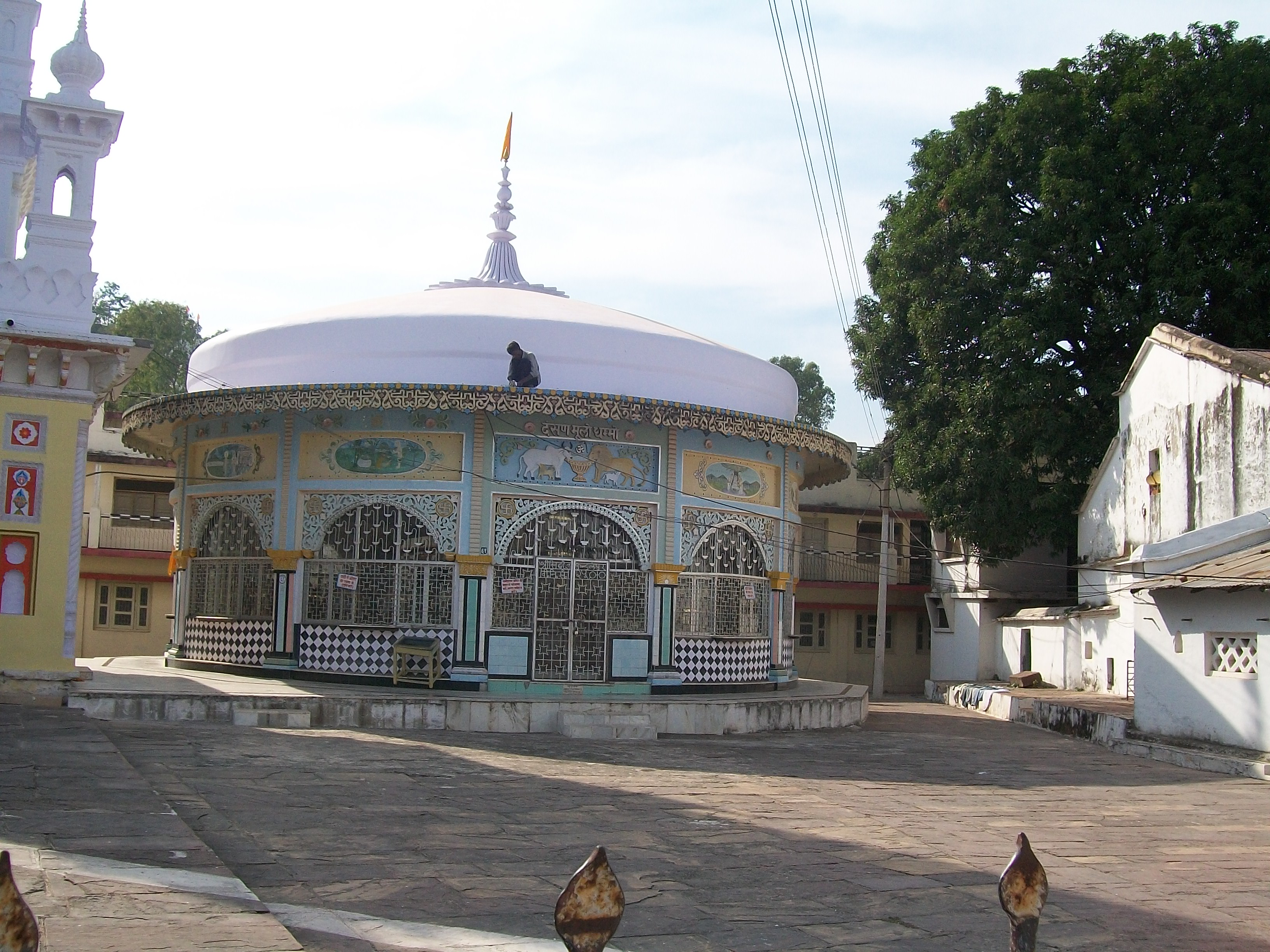
Samavasarana temple, 1974 AD

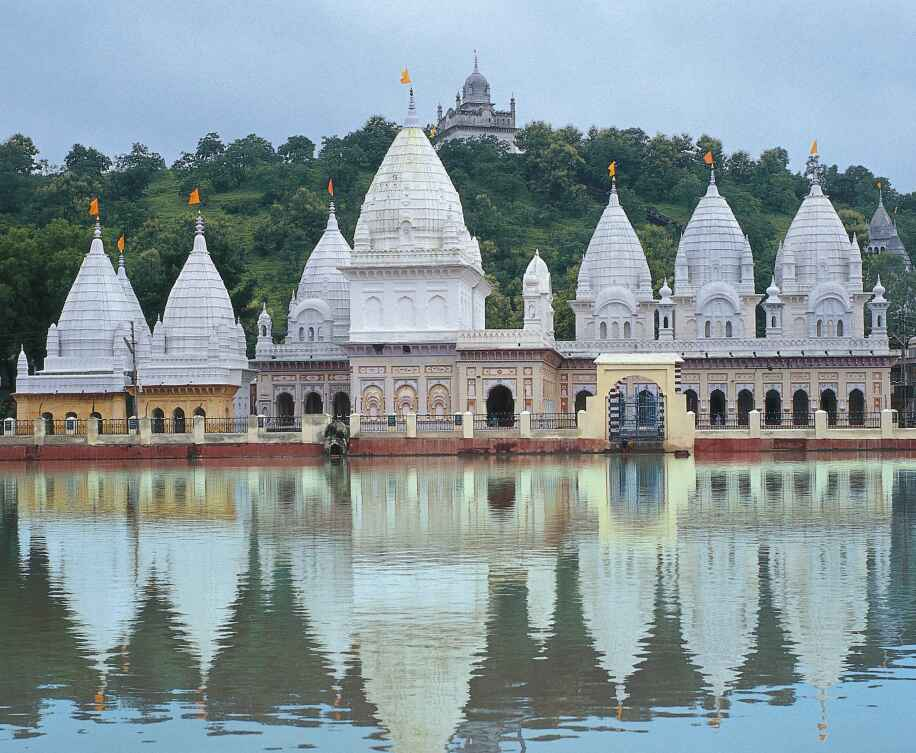
Jain temples near Vardhmansagar lake, 19th CE. Bhagbali Pande temple of 18th CE at the hill top.

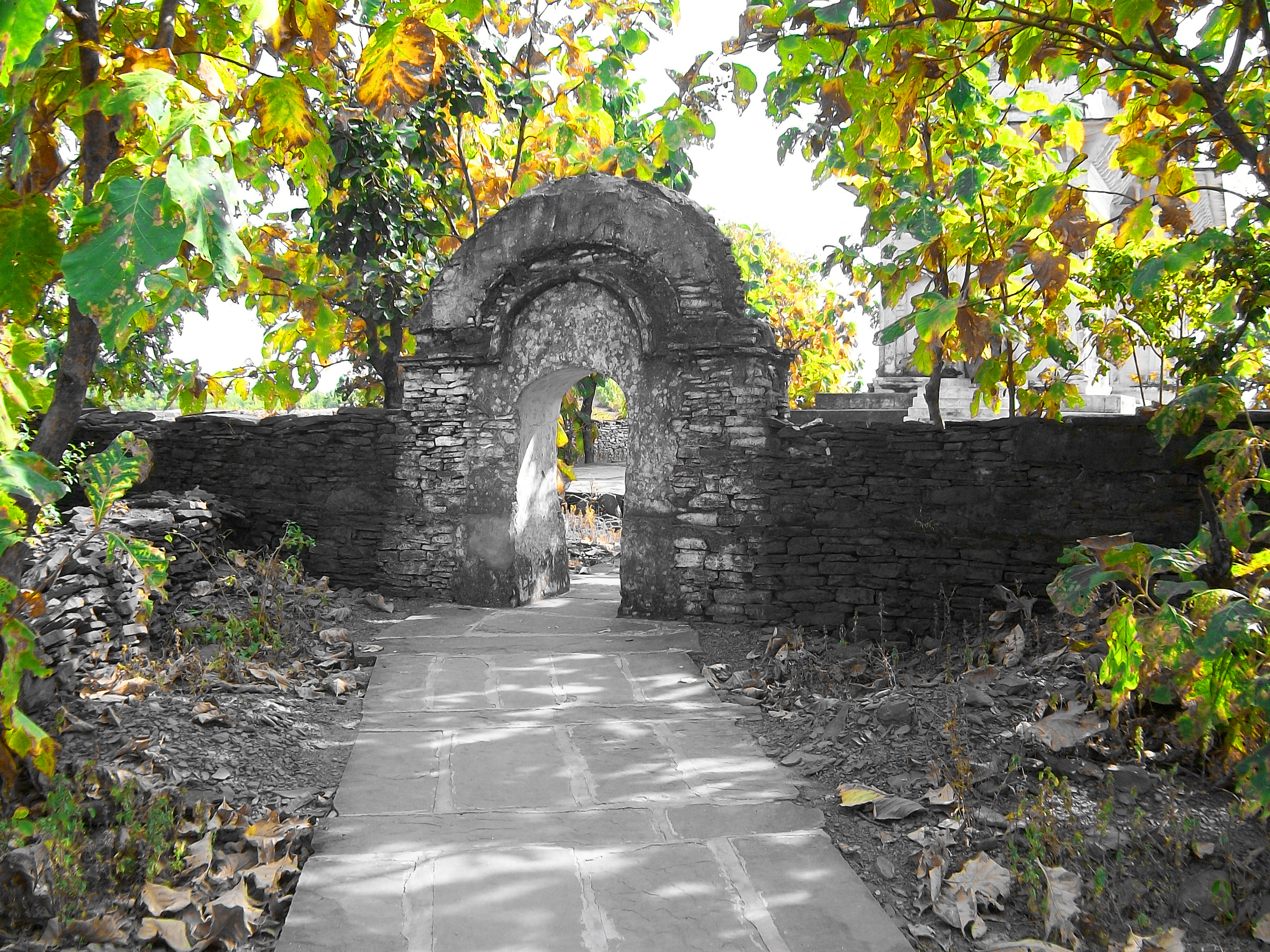
Temple enclosure wall and gate constructed using rubble stone masonry with native teak trees

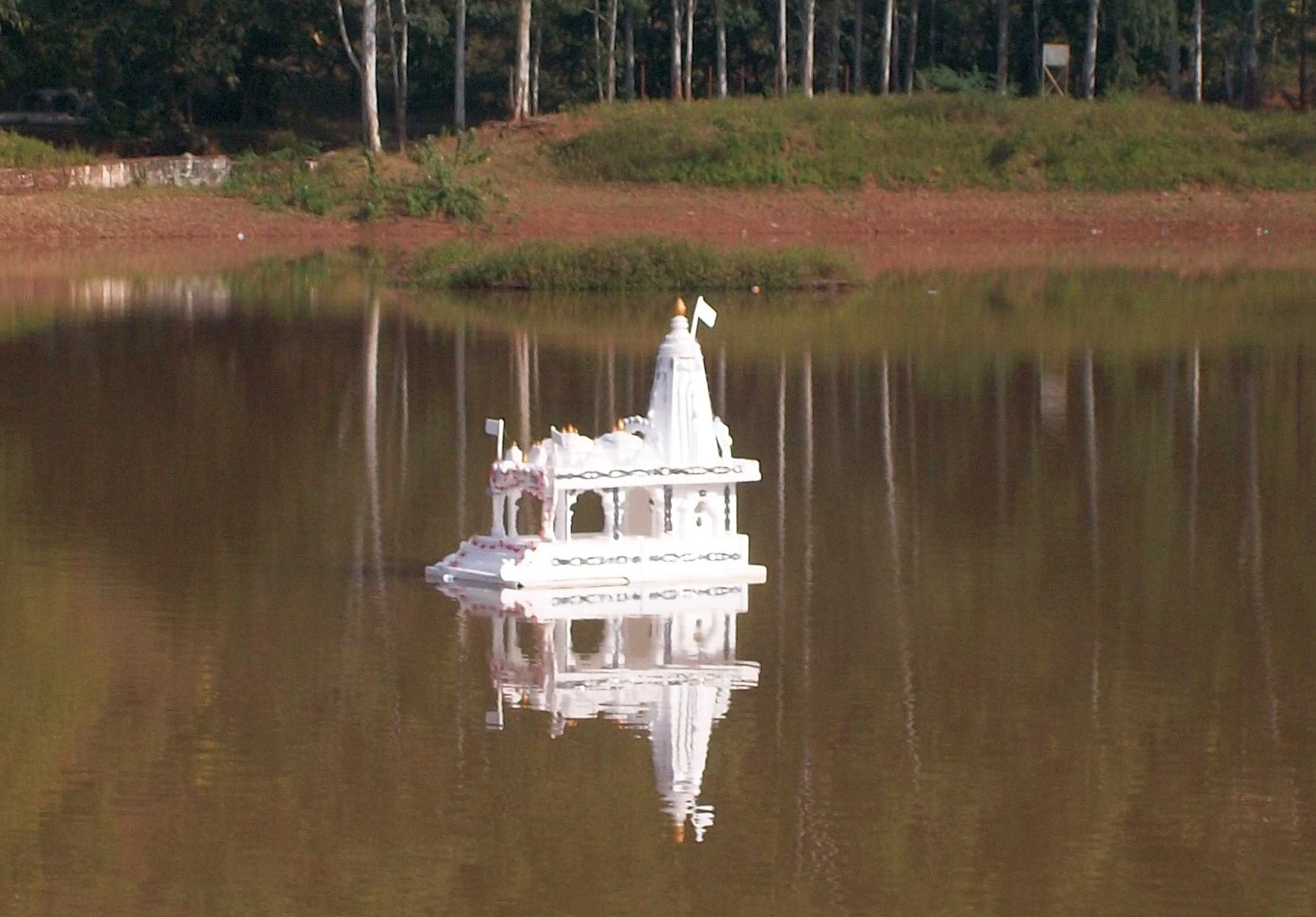
Jain shrine inside Kundalpur lake

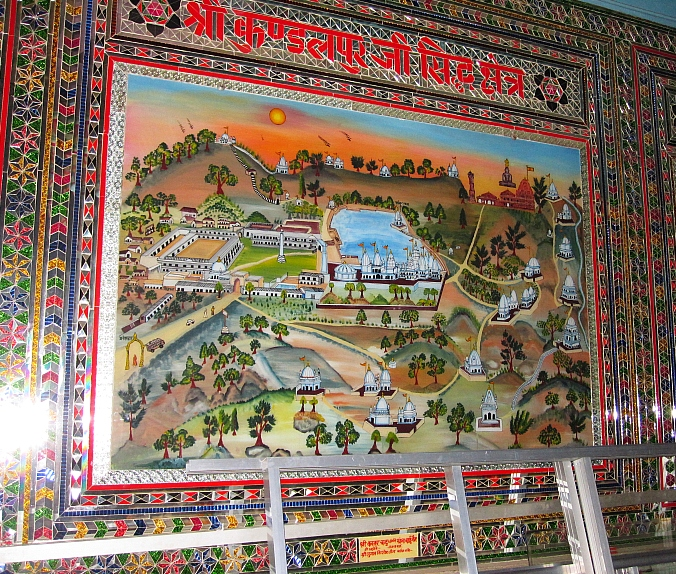
Glass mural with a traditional representation of Kundalpur in a Jain Temple Katni

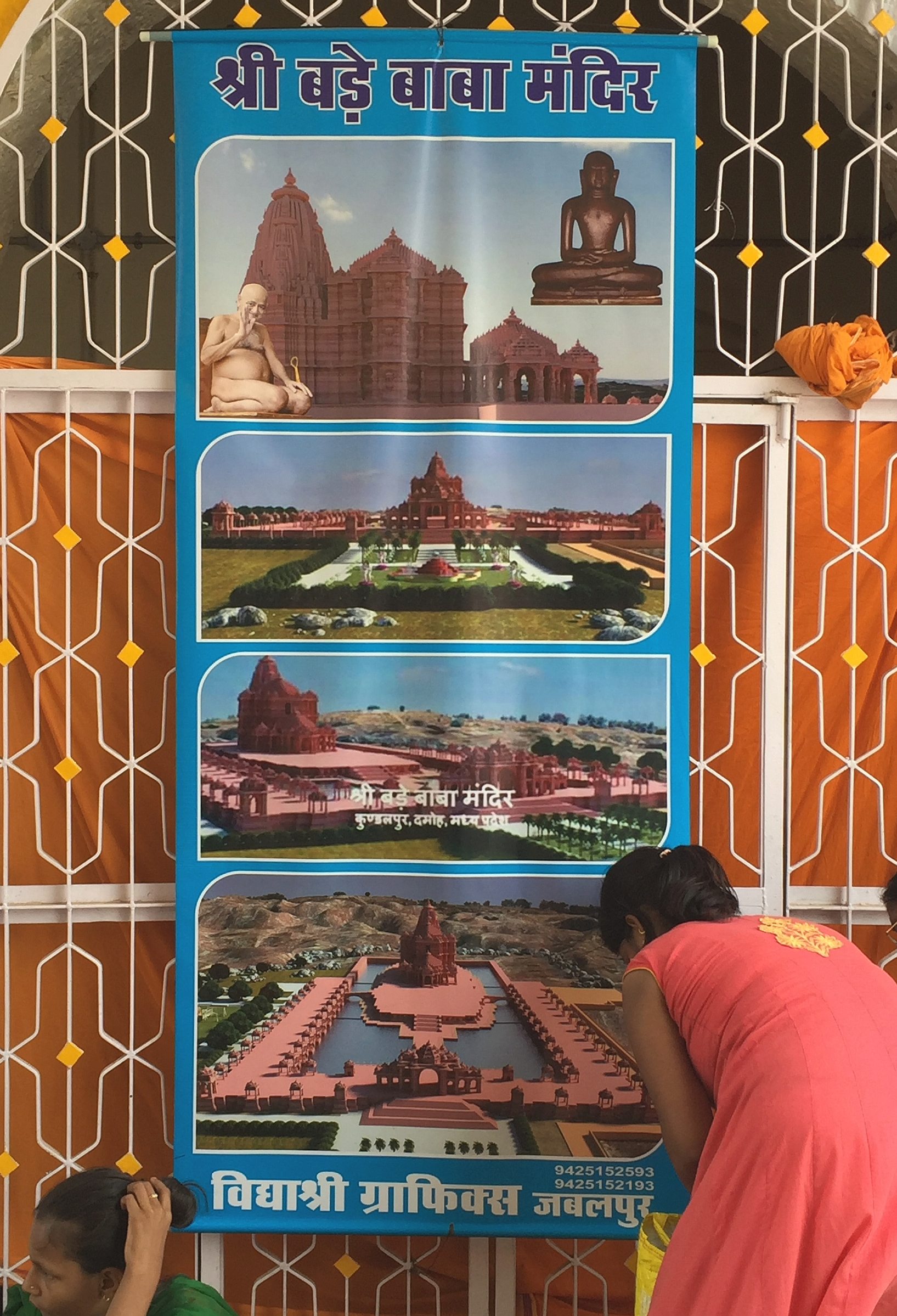
Planned new Bade Baba temple on a poster. The design has since been revised.

== See also ==
- Jainism in Bundelkhand
- Hanumantal Bada Jain Mandir
