= Hirdepur =

- Town
- Location in India
- Coordinates: 23.83°N 78.80°E

Hirdepur is a Census Town city in Damoh District, Madhya Pradesh. Its part of Damoh Urban Agglomeration.

== Population ==
The Hirdepur Census Town has population of 8,100 of which 4,263 are males while 3,837 are females as Census India 2011.

== History ==
Hirdepur town settled by Mandla kingdoms King Raja Hirdeshah Lodhi.

== Geography ==
Hirdepur is located in Bundelkhand Reason. Hirdepur lake located here.

== See also ==
- Damoh District
