= Narsinghgarh, Damoh =

Narsingarh
- town
- Location in Madhya Pradesh, India Narsingarh (India)
- Coordinates: 23.99°N 79.39°E
- Country: India
- State: Madhya Pradesh
- District: Damoh

Population (2011)
  - Total: 6,735

Languages
  - Official: Hindi
- Time zone: UTC+5:30 (IST)
- ISO 3166 code: IN-MP
- Vehicle registration: MP

Narsinghgarh is a town of historical importance in Damoh District, Madhya Pradesh, India. It has an ancient fort built by the Gondwana Kingdom, and the town is situated by Sunar River.

A cement factory established here by Birla Group was later taken over by the German company HeidelbergCement, and it now produces cement by the name of Mycem Cement. There are many historical places in Narsinghgarh, such as the Jankiraman temple, dedicated to Ram and Sita, and an old temple of Siddha Ganesha Mandir. The main part of the ancient fort, which is built by the Godwana Kingdom, is situated beside the Ganesha temple. In Ram Bagh Temple, Hanuman is worshiped. There are many stories about this temple, but the most popular belief is that the statue of Hanuman was taken out from the well situated near the temple, by a cowboy after Hanuman told him to do so in a dream. On every Makara Sankranti, the fair (mela) is organized by the nearby locals. Another place, which the locals call Tullu Jhiriya, is famous for continuous flowing water from the rocks.

Twelve kilometers away from Narsingarh is a place called the "Madkole". This place is famous for the Madhkoleshwar Mahadev Mandir, which is the ancient temple of Shiva. The local people says that the temple was built by devtas in one night. The two rivers, Sunar and Kopra, can be seen in a place called the Sangam. This is the other place where the yearly Makar Sankranti fair is organized by the locals.Kalakand of sitanagar village is famous delicacy in the area

== Demographics ==
Narsinghgarh Town has population of 6,735 of which 3,837 are males while 2,898 are females as per Census India 2011.

== Geography ==
Narsinghgarh is located at 23.99°N 79.39°E. It has an average elevation of 352 meters (1,158 feet).

== See also ==
- Damoh District
- Patharia
