= Singrampur =

- town
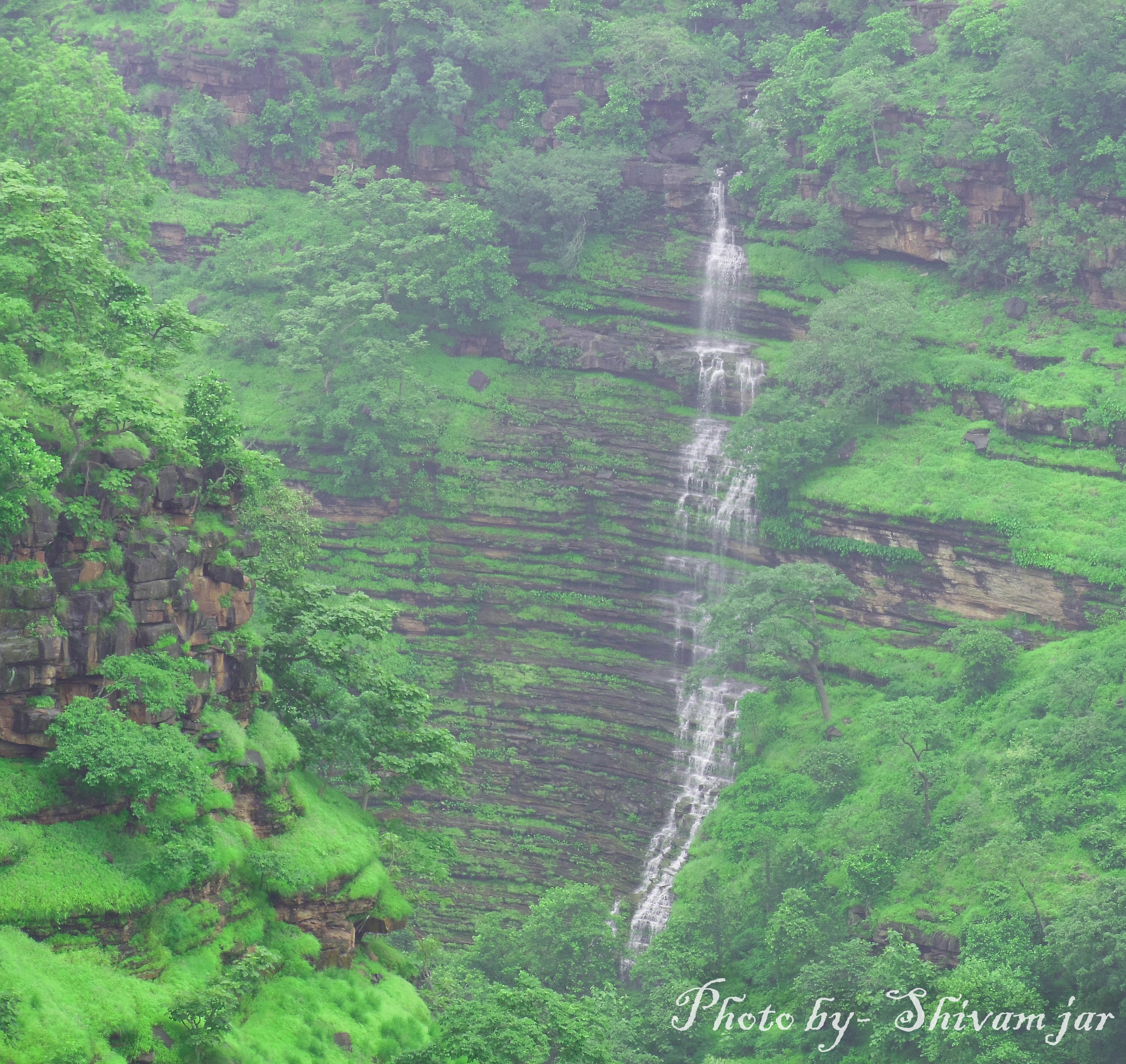
- Waterfall Near Town

- Location in Madhya Pradesh, India
- Coordinates: 23°32′58″N 79°48′1″E
- Country: India
- State: Madhya Pradesh

Languages
  - Official: Hindi
- Time zone: UTC+5:30 (IST)

Singrampur is a historical place where final battle fought between Rani Durgawati and Mughal king Akbar's Senapati Asaf Khan. The town in named after Sangram which in Hindi means war.

Singrampur comes under district Damoh, Madhya Pradesh.

== Places of interest ==
Rani Durgawati sanctuary: is located near to Singrampur where you can find all wild animals.

Singorgarh fort : is near to Singrampur is another place of historical importance. It was built by Raja Vain Bason. Gond Rajas stayed in it for a long time. It was with Gond Raja Dalpat Shah and his Rani Durgawati at the end of the 15th century. There is also a lake here, which is full of lotus flowers. This is an ideal picnic spot.

Najaraa: 6 km from Singrampur towards Kalumar on W.B.M. road there is road leading to the spot called "Nazara". This place has been developed as a platform on the top of the mountain giving a breath taking overview of the Rani Durgawati Abhyaran. The sight of the thick forest can be enjoyed from here. The caves of the wild animals on the hills can also be seen. Wild animals are also spotted roaming around in the forest.

Giri Darshan: Situated on the High way from Damoh to Jabalpur 5 km from Jabera and 7 km from Sigrampur toward Damoh on a green hill in the jungle, a double storeyed rest house cum watch tower was built by the Forest Dept. It is a notable piece of Architecture. From the main road a narrow path along of the bank of a tank reaches this rest house. The reservation to stay in the rest house can be made at DFO office at Damoh. The sight of the roads of the small hills and views of the sunrise and the sunset await the visitors. This view can be seen from the terrace of the rest house. The wild animals also can be seen at night.

Nidhan Kund: Almost 1/2 km from the Bhainsaghat Rest House towards the Bhainsa village (5 km from Singrampur), a road goes to this waterfall. One kilometer from the main road a stream between the high black rocks flows down from more than 100 ft (30 m) height. This is called Nidan Kund. During the months of July and August there is much water in the stream so the sight of this fall from the front is impressive. It becomes a picnic spot in September and October as water in the stream is reduced. There are step-like formations on the black rocks against the flow of the stream which create a spectacle when the water flow is high.

Sad-Bhawna Sikhar: It is the highest point of the Vindhya Range. On Bhainsa - Kalumar road there cuts a forest road which is almost 6 km long. A view of the area around it can be seen from here. This peak is 2467 ft (752 m) above sea level. The twinkling light of Jabalpur city can be seen from here at clear nights. It is not very easy to climb this peak so it is convenient to use a jeep or any other 4 wheeler. It is 10 km from Singrampur.
