= Lasudiya Mori =

- Census Town
- Country: India
- State: Madhya Pradesh
- District: Indore
- Time zone: UTC+5:30 (IST)

Lasudiya Mori is a Census Town situated in Indore of Madhya Pradesh, India. The total geographical area of Lasudiya Mori census town is 6 square kilometer which makes it the third biggest census town by area in Indore. According to the 2011 Indian Census Lasudiya Mori consist of the Total population of 10,225 people, amongst them 5,429 are males and 4,796 are females.
