= Nohta =

Village in Madhya Pradesh, India

- Interactive map of Nohta
- Country: India
- State: Madhya Pradesh
- District: Damoh

Population (2011)
  - Total: 6,943

Nohta is a village located in the Damoh district of the Indian state of Madhya Pradesh. It is located about 13 miles southeast of Damoh, the district headquarters, on the NH34.

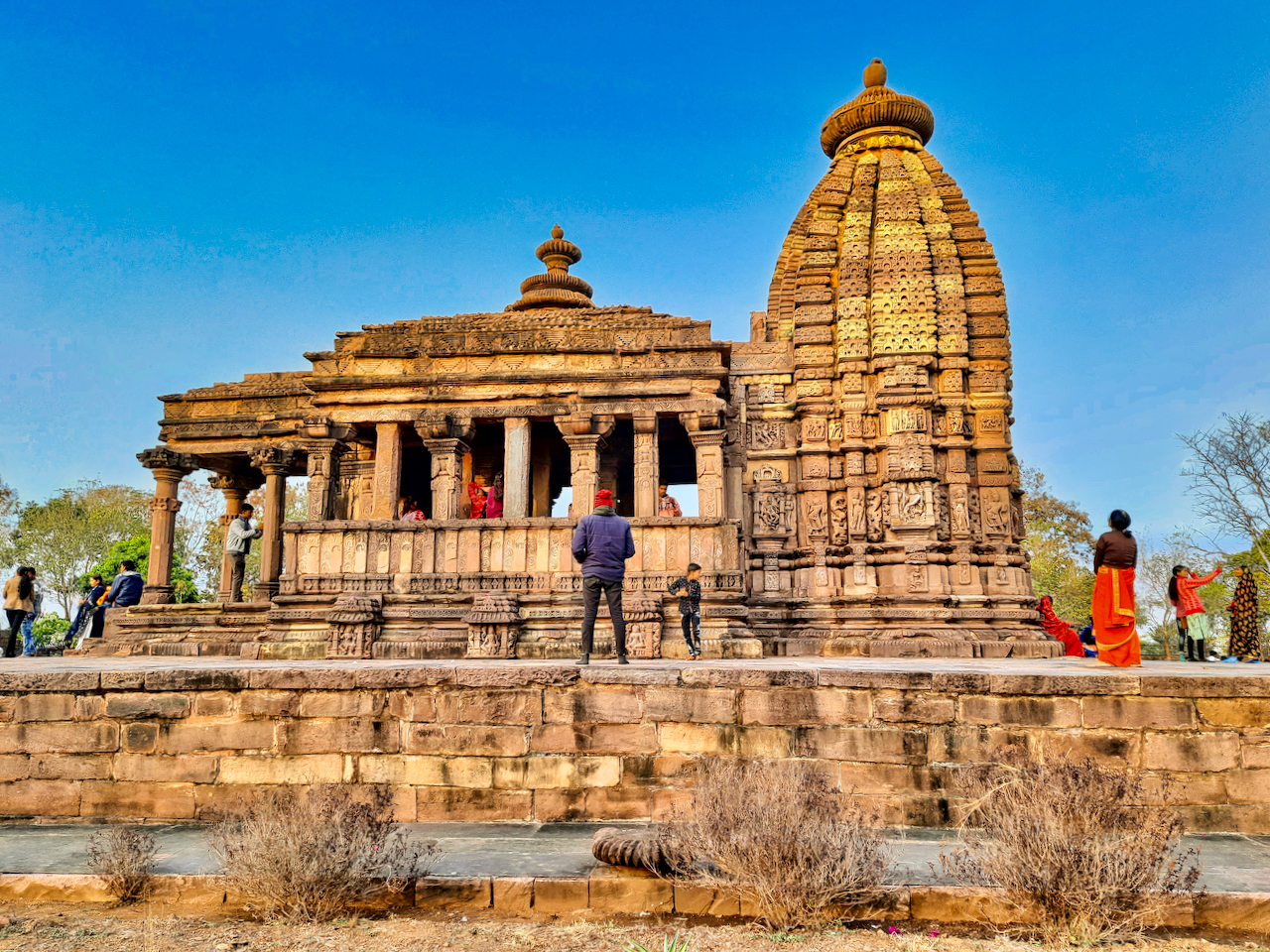
Nohleshwar Temple

== Geography ==
Nohta is located on 23°40′32″N 79°34′31″E. it's 25 km away from Damoh, On the banks of Vyarma River.

== Landmarks ==
Remains of several Hindu and Jain temples have been found in Nohta. Among these, the Nohleshwar Temple is the only temple still standing.

The Nohleshwar Mahotsav is a multi-day cultural and spiritual festival held in Nohta.

== Demographics ==
According to the 2011 census, the village had a population of 6943, in 1610 households.
