= Nohleshwar Temple =

Temple in Damoh

Coordinates: 23°40′18″N 79°34′53″E

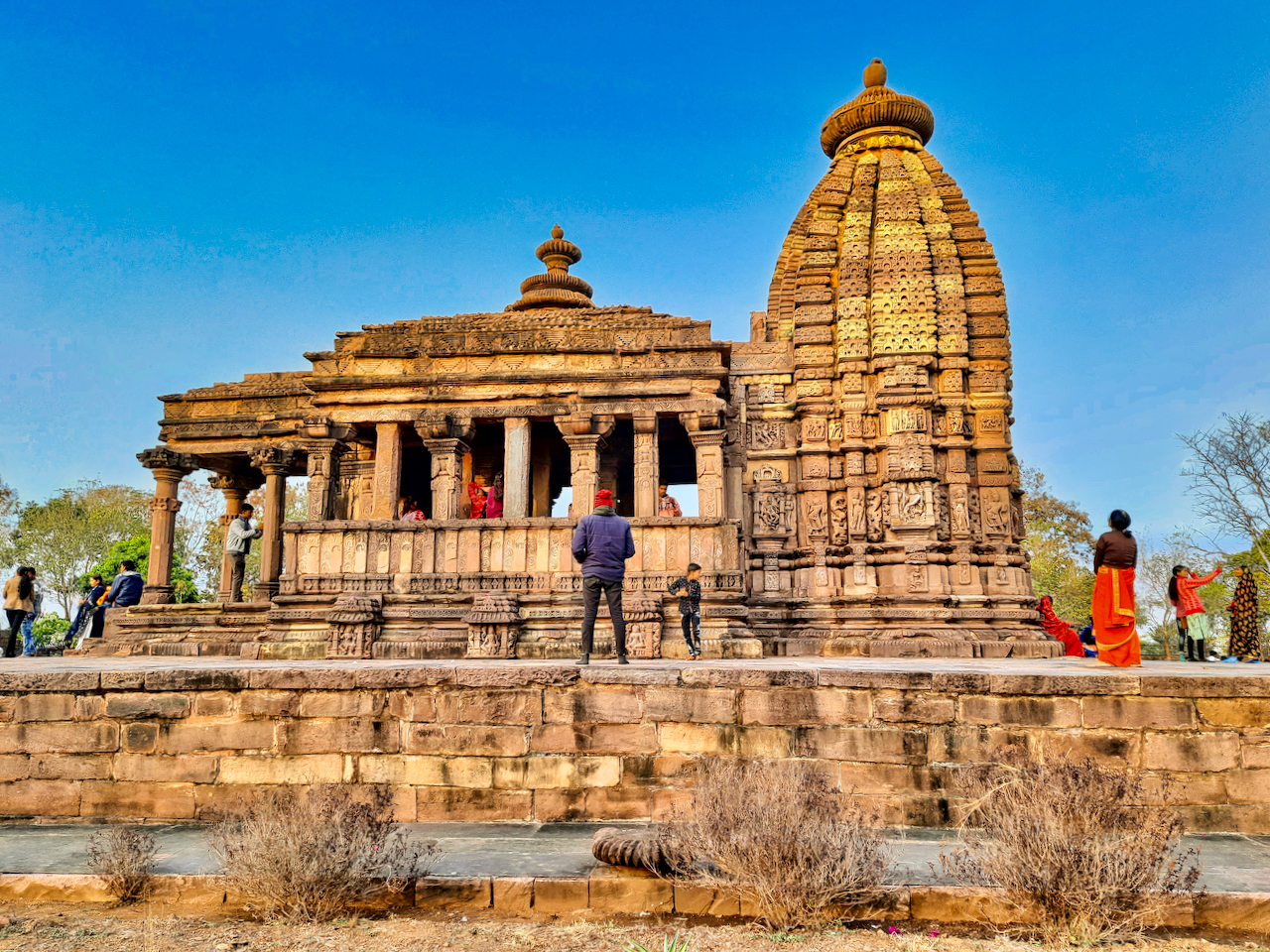

Religion
- Affiliation: Hinduism
- Deity: Shiva

Location
- Location: Damoh district

Nohleshwar Temple is a temple located in Nohta in the Damoh district of Mahdya Pradesh in India. It is protected as a monument of national importance.

== History ==
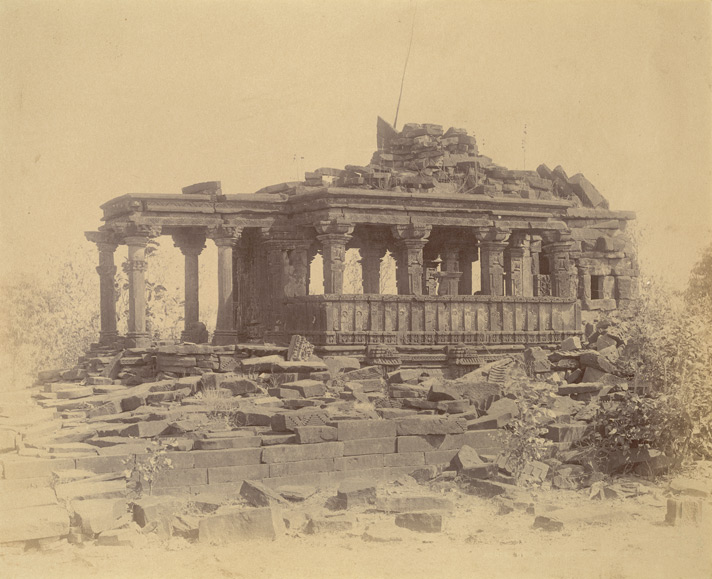
The temple photographed by Henry Cousens, c. 1893

The temple was built by Yuvarajadeva I of the Kalachuri dynasty, under the influence of his queen Nohala.

The British archaeologist Henry Cousens surveyed the area in 1893, and found the temple in a dilapidated condition, with the outer walls, roof of the gallery, and shikhara having all fallen down and lying in ruins. The temple was restored by the Archaeological Survey of India.

== Description ==
The temple is built in the Nagara style with a mukhamandapa (porch), a sabhamandapa (hall), an antarala (ante-chamber) and a garbhagriya (sanctum).

=== Sanctum ===
The sanctum contains the idol of the principal deity, Shiva. The sanctum is surmounted by a shikhara.
