= Singorgarh fort =

Singorgarh Fort, is a hill-fort located in Damoh district in the Madhya Pradesh state of Central India. It is about 45 km from Jabalpur city, on the way to Damoh town. It is presently under the Archeological Survey of India.

In its peak years, thousands of people lived in the fort, which was spread over large area. Many of its former watch towers are still visible. The fort was attacked in June of 1564 during the invasion of the Garha Kingdom by the Mughal forces. At that time, Rani Durgavati, the ruling Queen of Gondwana, resided there; she later moved to Chouragarh Fort in Narsinghpur.

== Etymology ==
Alexander Cunningham and other archaeologists believe that the name "Singorgarh" is derived from Gajasimhadurga meaning "fortress of Gaj Singh". The earliest inscription found in Singorgarh is dated 1307 AD and the fort is called Gaja-Singhadurggye, meaning the "hill fortress of Gaja Singh". Gajsimha or Gaja Singh Pratihar was a Pratihar Rajput ruler after whom the fort is believed to be named.

== History ==
Singorgarh is believed to have been founded by the Pratihar Rajputs, who ruled in the Damoh region during the 14th century. Behram H. Mehta states that the fort was built by the Rajputs and later strengthened by the Gonds of Garha Kingdom. The known Pratihar rulers of Singorgarh are Gajsimha or Gaja Singh Pratihar, Maharajaputra Sri Vaghadeva and Kumara Shri Vaghadeva. Maharajaputra Shri Vaghadeva was a feudatory of the Chandela king Bhojavarman (1285-1288 CE) and Hammiravarman (1288-1311 CE). The Pratihara rule over Singorgarh probably ended with the invasion of the Delhi Sultan Ala-ud-din Khalji's forces, who were going to the Deccan and conquered Bundelkhand on their march.

In the 16th century, the fort was conquered by the Gond ruler of Garha-Katanga, Sangram Shah.

== Accessibility ==
It is about 45km from Jabalpur city, on the way to Damoh town. The fort is 4 miles away from the nearest settlement, the Singrampur town, and 28 miles south-east of Damoh town. The site must be accessed by bike, car or bus as there is proper road to it.
