= Maharaja Chhatrasal Bundelkhand University =

State University in Madhya Pradesh

- Type: Public
- Established: 2015
- Academic affiliations: UGC
- Chancellor: Governor of Madhya Pradesh
- Vice-Chancellor: Prof. Rakesh Kushwah
- Location: Chhatarpur, Madhya Pradesh, India; 24.904°N 79.592°E
- Campus: Urban
- Website: www.mcbu.ac.in

Maharaja Chhatrasal Bundelkhand University (MCBU) is a state university in Chhatarpur, India. While the university campus is under construction at Guraiya Road (Near Peetambra Colony/Khare Colony, Satai Road), temporarily building has been allotted by Government Maharaja P.G. College of its Commerce Block for administration and affiliation purposes.

== Affiliated colleges ==
The institution affiliates the colleges of Chhatarpur district and other neighbouring districts like Damoh, Panna, Sagar, Tikamgarh and Niwari.

== Campus ==
While the university campus is under construction at Guraiya Road (Near Peetambra Colony/Khare Colony, Satai Road), temporarily building has been allotted by Government Maharaja P.G. College of its Commerce Block for administration and affiliation purposes.
