= Damoh =

City in Madhya Pradesh, India

- City
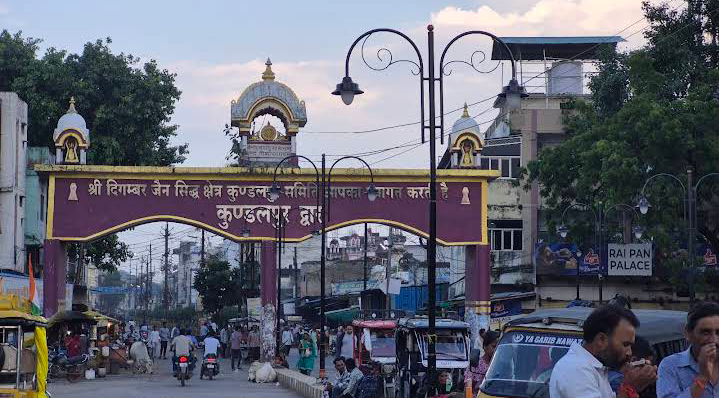
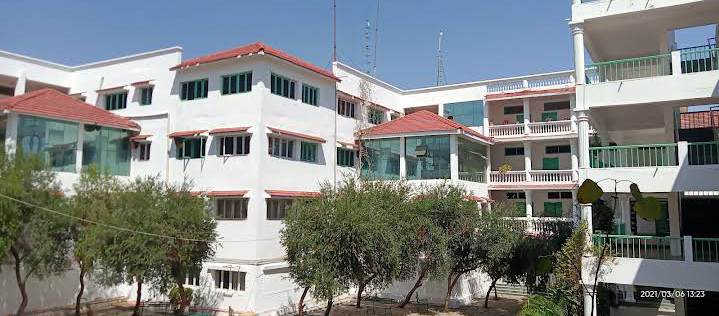
- Kundalpur Dwar Eklavya University

- Location in Madhya Pradesh, India. Damoh (India)
- Coordinates: 23.84°N 79.45°E
- Country: India
- State: Madhya Pradesh
- District: Damoh
- Named for: Rani Damayanti

Government
  - Type: Mayor–council
  - Body: Damoh Municipal Corporation
  - Mayor: Manju Rai
  - District Magistrate: Shri Sudhir Kumar Kochar

Area
  - Total: 7,306 km^{2} (2,821 sq mi)
- Elevation: 595 m (1,952 ft)

Population
  - Total: 126,219
  - Density: 148/km^{2} (380/sq mi)

Languages
  - Official: Indian English, Hindi
- Time zone: UTC+5:30 (IST)
- PIN: 470661
- Telephone code: 07812
- Vehicle registration: MP-34
- Sex ratio: 913 ♂/♀
- Average Literacy Rate: 86.18%
- Nearest Airport: Dumna Airport, Jabalpur (120 KM)
- Festival: Bundeli Mahotsav
- Website: damoh.nic.in

Damoh is a city in the Indian state of Madhya Pradesh. The city is also the district headquarters of Damoh district.

It is also known for Singrampur Nidan Waterfall, Singorgarh fort, Nohleshwar Temple,Nohta, etc.

The Bade Baba Temple at Kundalpur and Singrampur Wildlife Sanctuary Singorgarh fort are primarily tourism and culture places of Damoh where tourist comes from across the world to visit these Places and contribute the indian economy.

Heidelberg Cement India's biggest Cement plant at narsinghgarh and Mysore Cements Limited at Imlai area are the popular industries situated at damoh and important for employment.

== History ==
=== Early history ===
Stone Age tools have been found in Singrampur Valley and it is believed that the area has been inhabited for thousands of years. Around the fifth century, it was part of the empire of Guptas of Pataliputra. This has been evidenced by plaques and coins, and monuments from the reigns of Samudragupta, Chandragupta I, and Skandgupta. From the eighth to twelfth centuries, some parts of the Damoh district were in the Chedi Empire, ruled by the Kalchuri dynasty from its capital Tripuri.

=== Modern history ===
Raja Hirde Shah, Lodhi king of Damoh, played an important part in the Bundela, Gond and Lodhi Uprising of 1842.

Damoh took part in the struggle for independence from the British. Under the leadership of Thakur Kishore Singh of Hindoria, Raja Devi Singh of Singrampur, Pancham Singh of Karijog, Gangadhar Rao of Mangarh, Raghunath Rao, Mejban Singh, and Govind Rao were among those who took part in the 1857 revolt.

Damoh suffered from famine in 1896-97 and 1900. By 1899 the India Midland Railway had completed the construction of Sagar–Damoh link and Damoh–Katni links. Freedom fighter Seth Govind Das was jailed in Damoh in 1923, and wrote a number of Hindi plays while imprisoned. In 1929, Acharya Shantisagar visited Damoh, the first such visit by a Digambar Muni to Damoh after several centuries.

In 1933, Mahatma Gandhi visited Damoh. In 1946, Sagar University was established as the region's primary centre for higher education.

== Geography ==
=== Location ===
Damoh is located at 23.88°N 79.45°E. It is at an average elevation of 595 metres (1,952 ft).

=== Climate ===
Climate data for Damoh (1991–2020, extremes 1970–2020)
Month	Jan	Feb	Mar	Apr	May	Jun	Jul	Aug	Sep	Oct	Nov	Dec	Year
Record high °C (°F)	33.3 (91.9)	37.2 (99.0)	42.6 (108.7)	45.2 (113.4)	49.8 (121.6)	47.7 (117.9)	42.6 (108.7)	38.4 (101.1)	38.2 (100.8)	39.5 (103.1)	37.0 (98.6)	35.0 (95.0)	49.8 (121.6)
Mean daily maximum °C (°F)	25.0 (77.0)	28.9 (84.0)	34.0 (93.2)	39.1 (102.4)	42.7 (108.9)	38.7 (101.7)	32.6 (90.7)	30.6 (87.1)	31.7 (89.1)	33.1 (91.6)	30.0 (86.0)	26.6 (79.9)	32.7 (90.9)
Mean daily minimum °C (°F)	8.1 (46.6)	11.9 (53.4)	17.2 (63.0)	22.2 (72.0)	26.8 (80.2)	26.3 (79.3)	24.2 (75.6)	23.2 (73.8)	22.4 (72.3)	18.6 (65.5)	13.4 (56.1)	8.5 (47.3)	18.4 (65.1)
Record low °C (°F)	0.5 (32.9)	1.6 (34.9)	7.0 (44.6)	14.6 (58.3)	18.6 (65.5)	19.8 (67.6)	18.0 (64.4)	18.2 (64.8)	15.0 (59.0)	10.5 (50.9)	5.0 (41.0)	2.5 (36.5)	0.5 (32.9)
Average rainfall mm (inches)	14.3 (0.56)	14.0 (0.55)	11.0 (0.43)	5.8 (0.23)	8.0 (0.31)	141.4 (5.57)	339.2 (13.35)	407.0 (16.02)	186.3 (7.33)	36.3 (1.43)	15.2 (0.60)	5.3 (0.21)	1,184.4 (46.63)
Average rainy days	1.3	1.3	0.9	0.7	0.6	6.9	13.2	15.9	8.3	2.1	0.9	0.1	52.2
Average relative humidity (%)	68	60	46	36	37	57	79	85	81	67	63	64	62
Source: India Meteorological Department

== Demographics ==
According to the 2001 India census, Damoh city had a population of 112,160 (total urban population is 147,661). Males constituted 53% of the population and females 47%. Damoh had an average literacy rate of 73%, above the national average of 59.5%: male literacy was 89% and female literacy was 66%. 14% of the population was under 6 years of age.

== Government and administration ==
Damoh city has a Nagar Palika Parishad with the elected head Malti Asati. Tarun Rathi is the current DM & Collector for the Damoh District. The current Member of Legislative Assembly from Damoh constituency is Mr. Ajay Kumar Tandon.

== Notable people ==
- Sunil Lahri, actor, best known for portraying Lakshmana in the television show Ramayan (1987-1988)
- Chahat Pandey, TV Actress
- Tarun Sagar, Indian Jain monk (1967–2018)
- Jayant Kumar Malaiya, Indian Politician

== Transportation ==
Damoh is well connected with road and rail many highways And major road passing through Damoh. Damoh is 80 km away from Sagar, 105 km away from Jabalpur and 250 km away from Bhopal. Here is a Bus Stand in town, Daily bus service connects it from nearby major cities.

Katni - Bina railline passing through Damoh District. Damoh railway station is major railway station of the district it's is connected it from major city of India.

Major train originates from damoh -

- Bhopal–Damoh Rajya Rani Express
- Damoh–Kota Passenger

== See also ==
- Hirdepur
- Nohta

== Child Marriages in Damoh ==
The state of Madhya Pradesh has seen a troubling 47% increase in reported child marriages from 366 cases in 2020 to 538 cases in 2025, despite government efforts to curb the practice. The Damoh district in the Bundelkhand region has emerged as the most critical hotspot, accounting for a significant 21% of the state's total cases with 115 child marriages reported in 2025, the first time any single district has crossed the 100 case mark in five years. This persistent rise highlights a deep seated issue rooted in socio economic factors like poverty.
