= Damoh district =

Coordinates: 21.895724°N 80.795145°E

- District of Madhya Pradesh
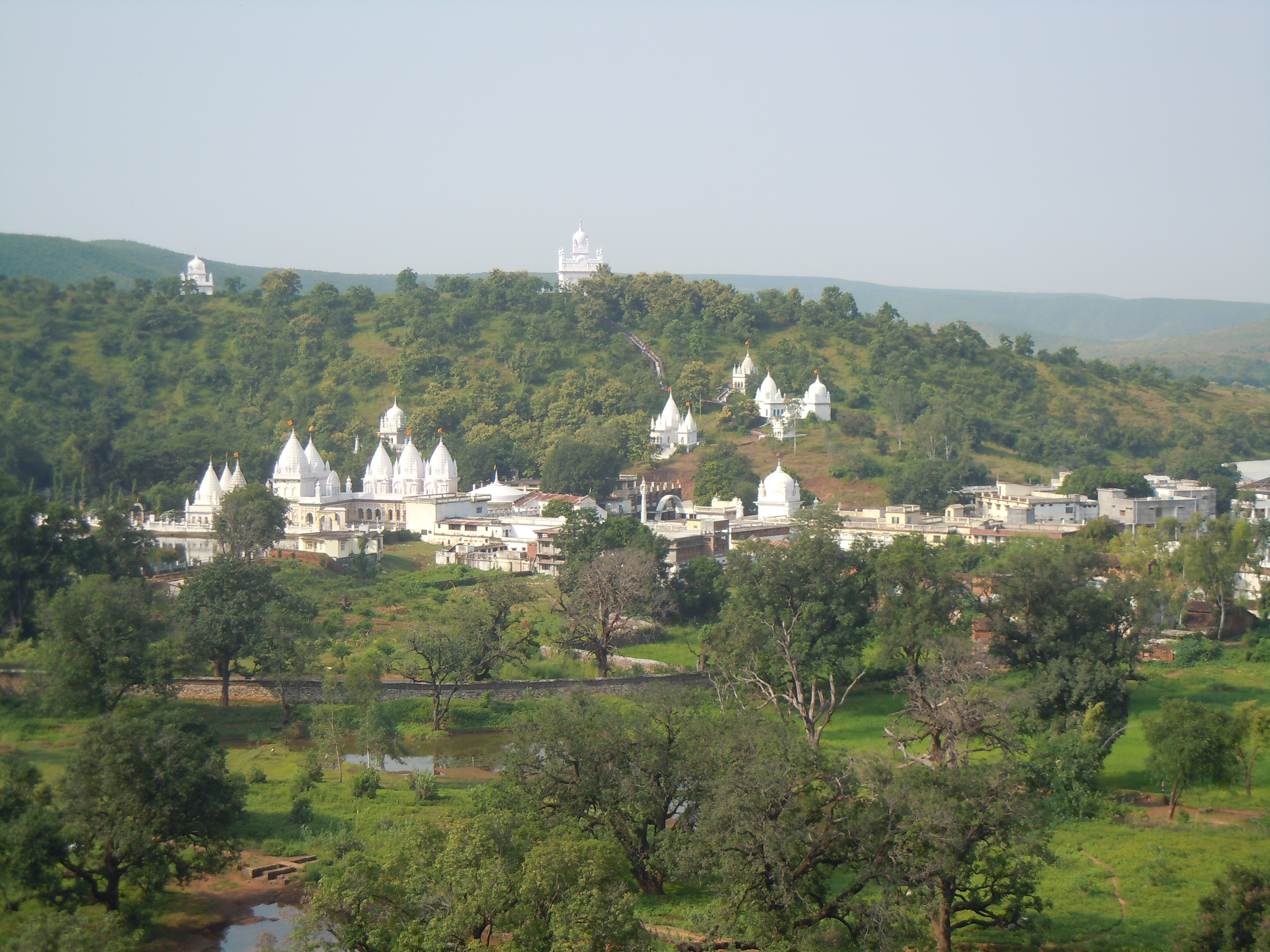
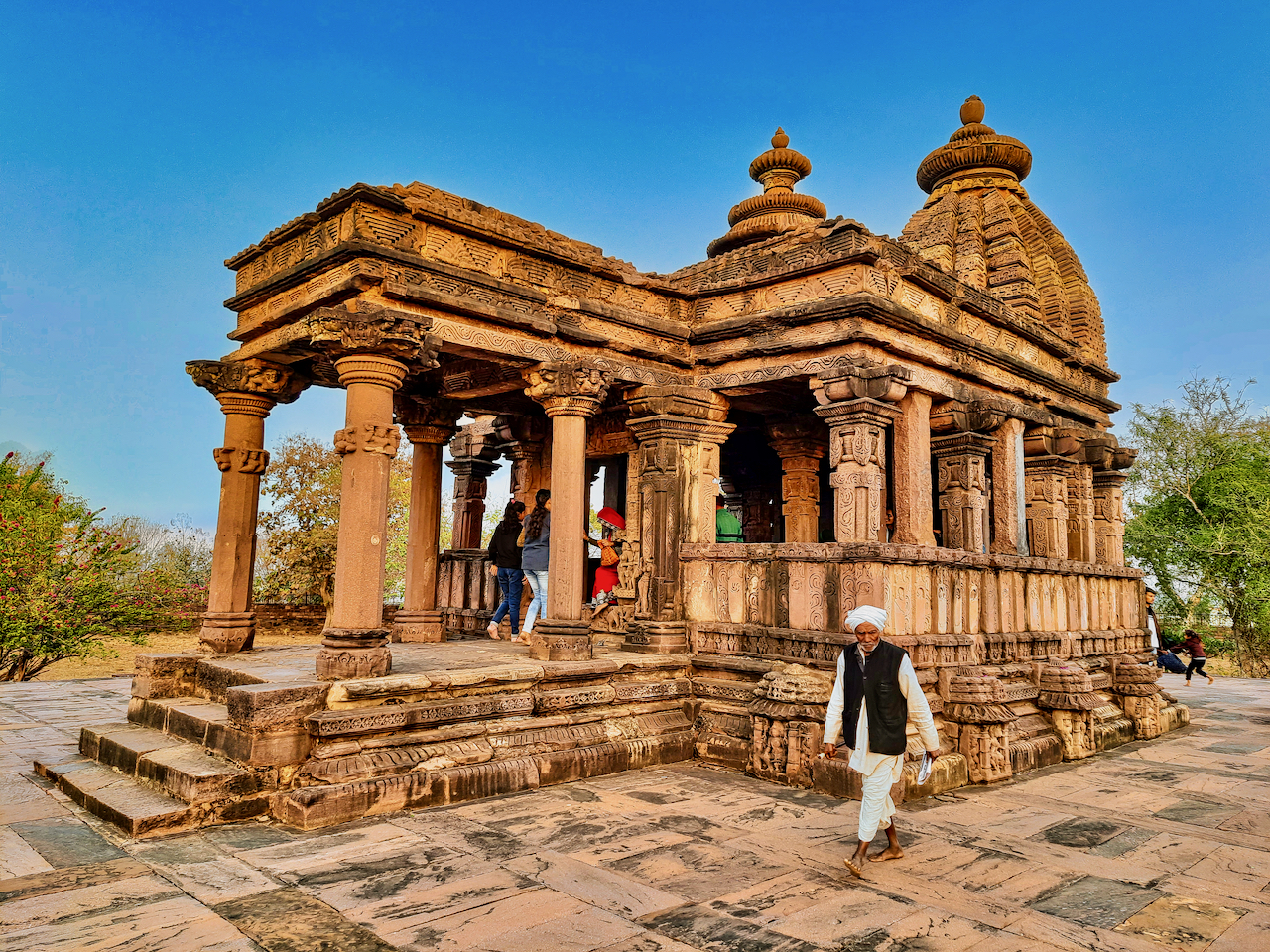
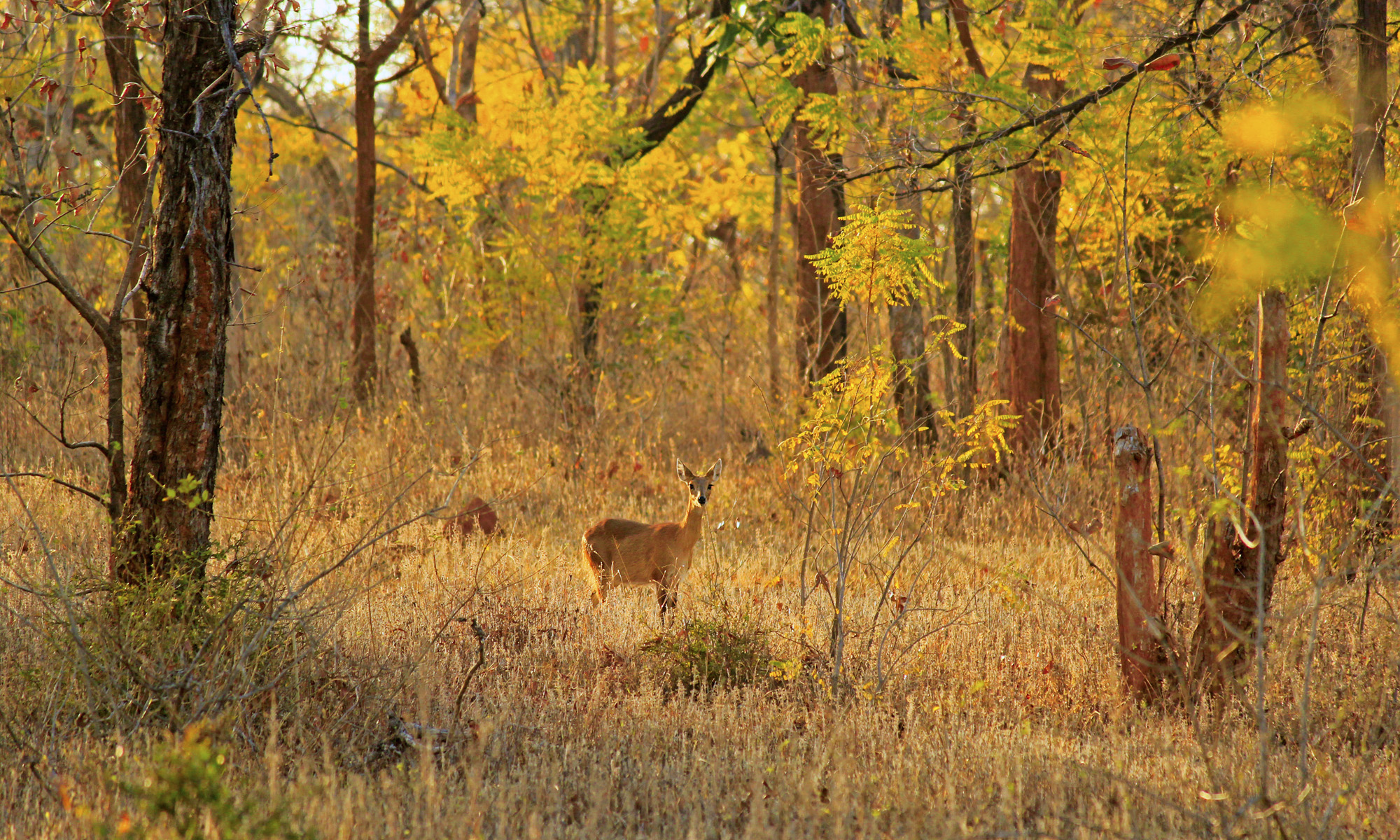
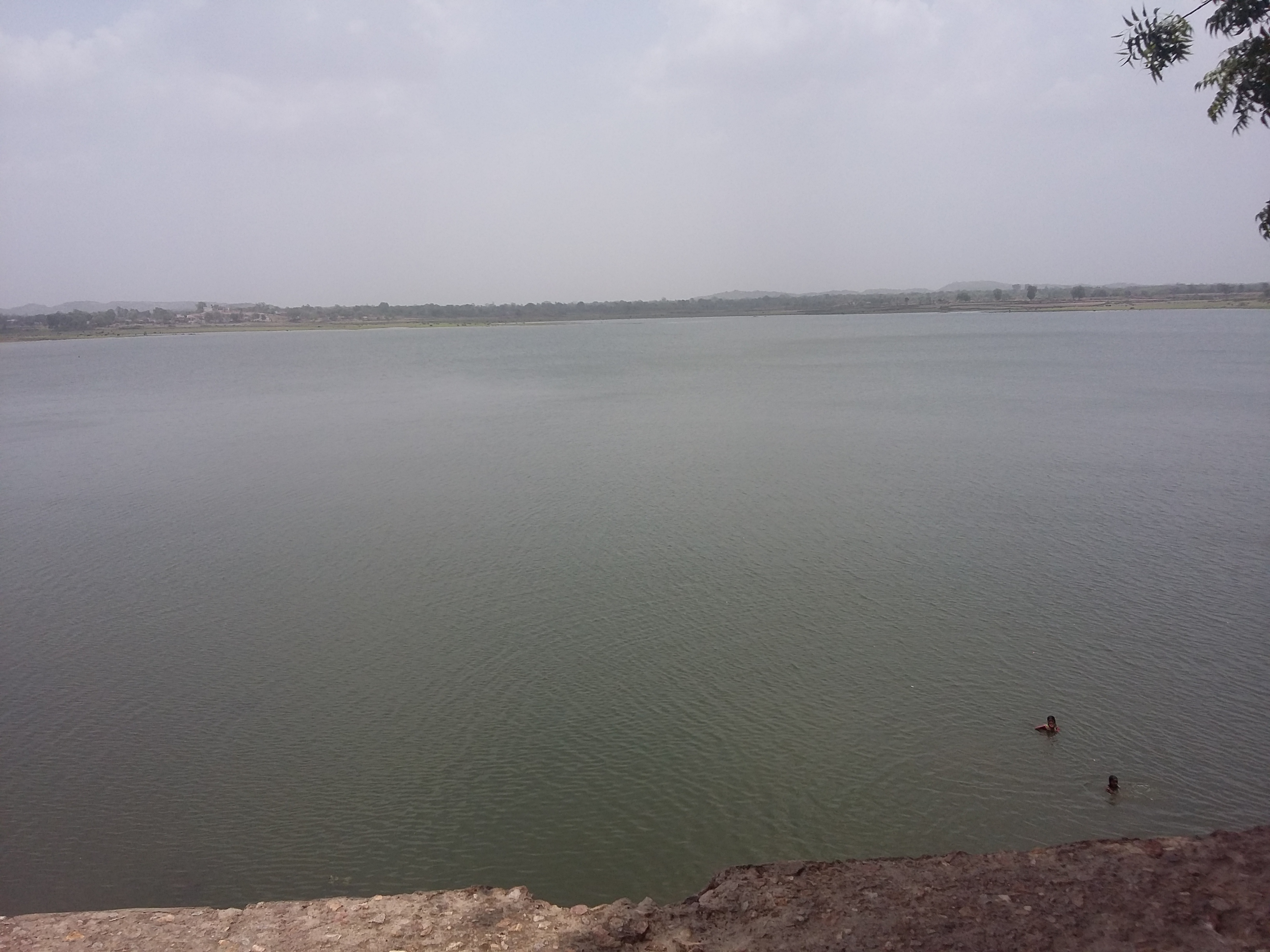
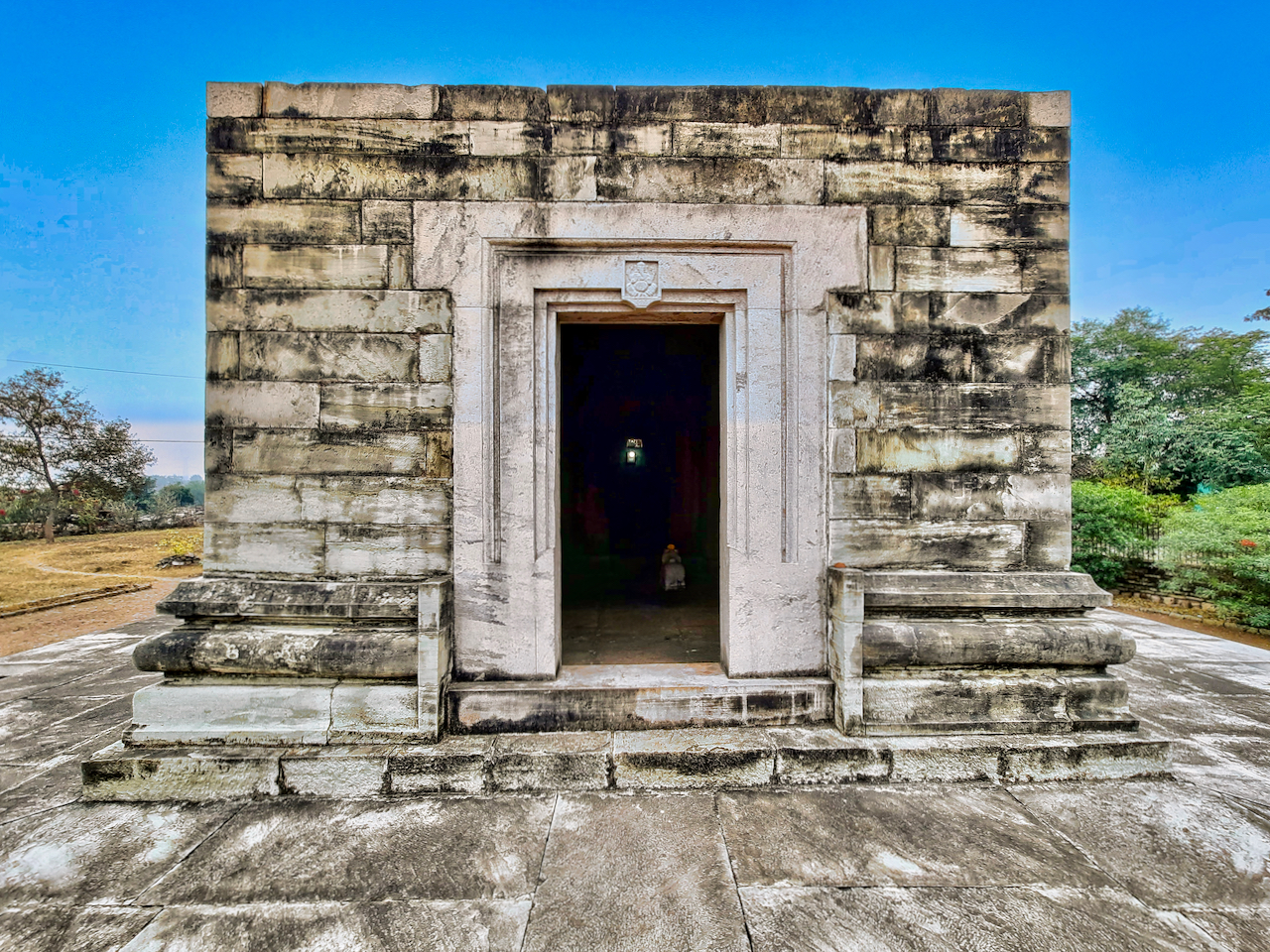
- Top: Jain temples at Kundalpur, Mahadeva Temple, Nohta; Bottem: Durgawati Wildlife Sentury, Sunar River in Damoh District, Sakor ancient temple

- Location of Damoh district in Madhya Pradesh
- Country: India
- State: Madhya Pradesh
- Division: Sagar
- Headquarters: Damoh
- Tehsils: 1. Damoh; 2. Tendu Kheda; 3. Pathariya; 4. Hatta; 5. Patera; 6. Jabera; 7.Batiyagarh

Government
  - Lok Sabha constituencies: Damoh

Area
  - Total: 7,306 km^{2} (2,821 sq mi)

Population (2011)
  - Total: 1,264,219
  - Density: 173.0/km^{2} (448.2/sq mi)

Demographics
  - Literacy: 70.92 per cent
  - Sex ratio: 913
- Time zone: UTC+05:30 (IST)
- Website: damoh.nic.in

Damoh district (Hindi pronunciation: [d̪əmoːɦ]) is located in the central Indian state of Madhya Pradesh. The town of Damoh is the district's headquarters. It has an area of 7,306 square km (2,821 sq mi).

== Geography ==
Damoh District lies between 23°09′ and 24°27′ North latitude and between 79°03′ and 79°57′ East longitude in the northern part of Madhya Pradesh. The Damoh District is located in Central India. Its boundaries touch Sagar, Narsinghpur, Jabalpur, Katni, Panna and Chhatarpur District. It's Belongs to Sagar Division. Sunar River and Vyarma River major River of District. The region is predominantly agrarian.

=== Other Major Towns ===
- Hindoria
- Madiyadoh
- Nohta
- Bandakpur
- Bansatar Kheda
- Singrampur
- Narsinghgarh
- Patharia
- Hatta

== Demographics ==
Historical population
Year	Pop.	±% p.a.
1901	286,248	—
1911	334,123	+1.56%
1921	288,054	−1.47%
1931	306,556	+0.62%
1941	343,211	+1.14%
1951	357,463	+0.41%
1961	438,343	+2.06%
1971	573,263	+2.72%
1981	721,453	+2.33%
1991	898,125	+2.21%
2001	1,083,949	+1.90%
2011	1,264,219	+1.55%

Religions in Damoh district (2011)
Religion	Percent
Hinduism	93.85%
Islam	3.79%
Jainism	1.98%
Other or not stated	0.38%

According to the 2011 census, Damoh District has a population of 1,264,219, roughly equal to that of Estonia or the US state of New Hampshire. This gives it a ranking of 383rd in India (out of a total of 640). The district has a population density of 173 inhabitants per square kilometre (450/sq mi). Its population growth rate over the decade 2001-2011 was 16.58%. Damoh has a sex ratio of 913 females for every 1000 males, and a literacy rate of 70.92%. 19.82% of the population lives in urban areas. Scheduled Castes and Tribes make up 19.49% and 13.15% of the population respectively.

Languages of Damoh district (2011)
1. Hindi (68.6%)
2. Bundeli (30.3%)
3. Others (1.10%)

At the time of the 2011 Census of India, 68.63% of the population in the district spoke Hindi and 30.27% Bundeli as their first language.

== Economy ==
In 2006, the Ministry of Panchayati Raj named Damoh one of the country's 250 most backward districts (out of a total of 640). It is one of the 24 districts in Madhya Pradesh currently receiving funds from the Backward Regions Grant Fund Programme (BRGF).

== Places of interest ==
The district has several places of historical importance. One example is the town of Nohta, which is located 21 km from Damoh on the banks of the Gauraya river. It was once a capital of the Chandela Rajputs and has many temples.

The ancient fort at Rajnagar village, 6 km from Damoh, was founded by the Mughals. Singhorgarh fort is another place of historical importance. It was built by Raja Vain Bason. Gond Rajas stayed in it for a long time. It was with Gond Raja Dalpat Shah and his Rani Durgawati at the end of the 15th century. After the death of Raja Dalpat Shah, the Senapati of the army of Mughal emperor Akbar had a battle with Rani Durgawati at the village, Singrampur.

The town of Narsinghgarh, situated on Sonar River, has an ancient fort built by Shah Taiyab. Birla group has established a cement factory at Narsinghgarh. Kundalpur is famous place for Jain temples. Situated 32 km from Damoh, there are 58 Jain temples in Kundalpur.

The Jageshwarnath temple at Bandakpur is a Hindu pilgrimage center. In Damoh district, the Lodhi Rajputs and Kurmi are more powerful communities. Damoh city has a Ghantaghar, circuit house, statue of Maharana Pratap at Jabalpur Naka, Kirti Stambh, Gajanan pahadi, Naugaja pahadi, fort of Rani Damyanti Bai near tahsil ground, Nehru park and a Jatashankar temple.

Kundalpur (Sanskrit: कुण्डलपुर) is a historical pilgrimage site for Jainism in India. It is located in the central Indian state of Madhya Pradesh, 35 km from the city of Damoh. Jatashankar and Belatal temple is also an important pilgrimage site for Hindus. It is located near the collector residence and the district jail.

== Tourist attractions ==
- Bandakpur
- Kundalpur
- Nohleshwar Temple
- Jatashankar
- Singorgarh fort
- Nidan Kund
- Nazara

== Transportation ==
=== By Roads ===
Damoh is well connected via Roads and Railway. NH 34 passes through the Damoh District. Damoh is connected to Sagar, Bhopal, Jabalpur, Panna and Katni.

=== By Rail ===
Katni - Bina railline passes through the Damoh District. The Damoh railway station is a major railway station in the district, connecting it to the major cities of India. Nearest Airport is Jabalpur Airport.
