= Gondi people =

Ethnolinguistic group in India

Gōṇḍī Kōītōr
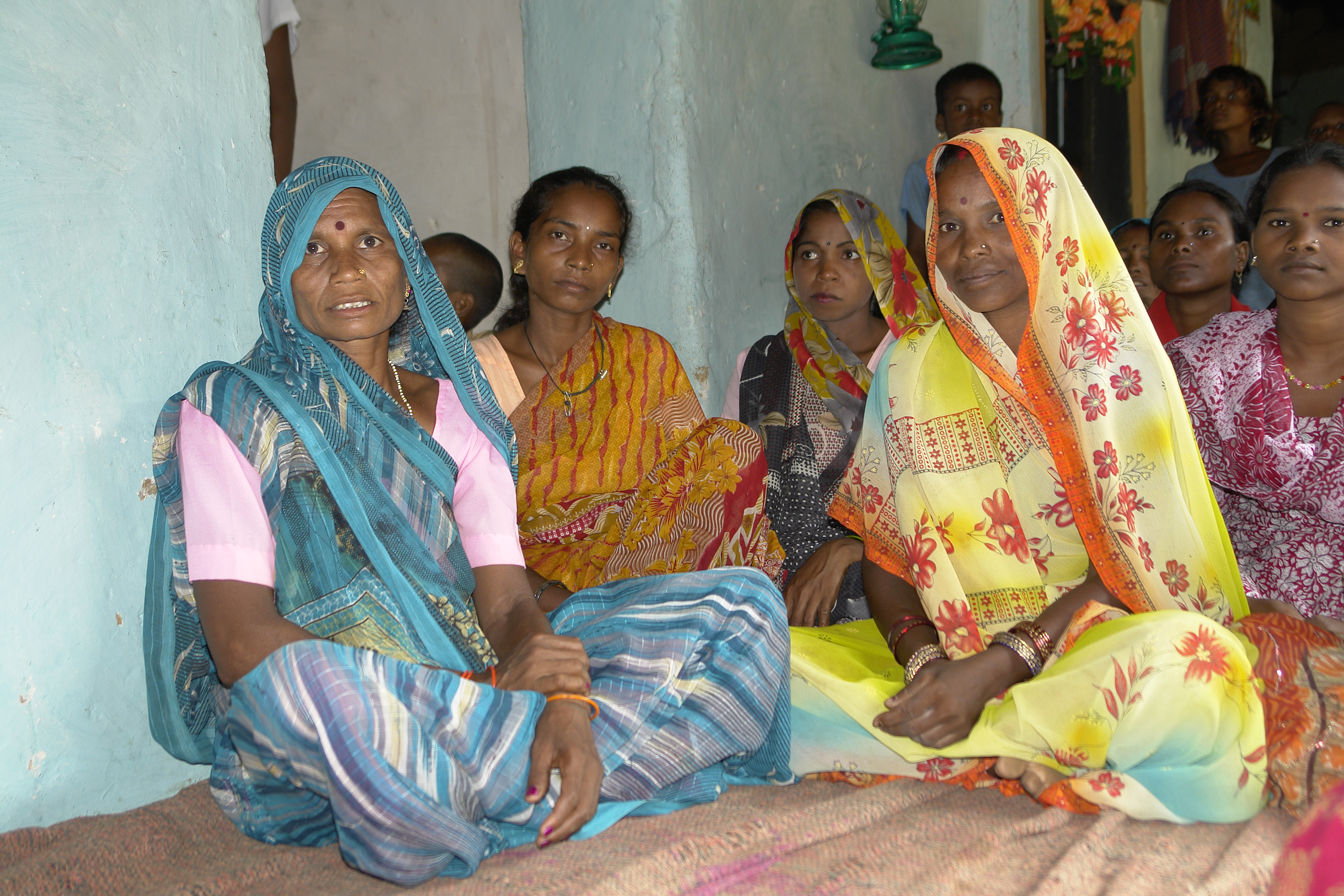
- Gondi women in Umaria district, India

Total population
- c. 13 million (2011, census)

Regions with significant populations
- India
- Madhya Pradesh: 5,093,124
- Chhattisgarh: 4,298,404
- Maharashtra: 1,618,090
- Odisha: 888,581
- Uttar Pradesh: 569,035
- Andhra Pradesh and Telangana: 304,537
- Bihar: 256,738
- Karnataka: 158,243
- Jharkhand: 53,676
- West Bengal: 13,535
- Gujarat: 2,965
- Nepal: 12,267

Languages
- Gondi • Regional languages

Religion
- Koyapunem with significant influence from Hinduism

Related ethnic groups
- Dravidian people; Muria people; Madia Gond

The Gondi (Gōṇḍī, IPA: [ɡoːɳɖiː]) or Gond people, who refer to themselves as "Kōītōr" (Kōī, Kōītōr, IPA: [koː.iː, koː.iː.t̪oːr]), are an ethnolinguistic group in India. Their native language, Gondi, belongs to the Dravidian family. They are spread over the states of Madhya Pradesh, Maharashtra, Chhattisgarh, Uttar Pradesh, Telangana, Andhra Pradesh, Bihar, and Odisha. They are classified as a Scheduled Tribe for the purpose of India's system of reservation.

The Gond have formed many kingdoms of historical significance. Gondwana kingdoms were located in the Gondwana region of India, which includes the eastern part of the Vidarbha of Maharashtra. The Garha Kingdom included parts of Madhya Pradesh immediately to the north of it and parts of western Chhattisgarh. The wider region extends beyond these, also including parts of northern Telangana, western Odisha, and southern Uttar Pradesh.

The 2011 Census of India recorded about 2.4 million speakers of Gondi as a macrolanguage and 2.91 million speakers of languages within the Gondi subgroup, including languages such as Maria (also known as Maadiya Gond). Many Gonds also speak regionally dominant languages such as Hindi, Marathi, Odia, and Telugu.

According to the 1971 census, the Gondi population was 5,653,422. By 1991, this had increased to 7,300,998, and by 2001, the figure was 8,501,549. For the past few decades, the group has been witness to the Naxalite–Maoist insurgency. Gondi people, at the behest of the Chhattisgarh government, formed the Salwa Judum, an armed militant group, to fight the Naxalite insurgency; this was disbanded by order of the Supreme Court of India on 5 July 2011, however.

== Etymology ==
The origin of the name Gond, used by outsiders, is still uncertain. Some believe the word to derive from the Dravidian kond, meaning hill, similar to the Khonds of Odisha or Konda-Doras of Andhra. The word gonda/gunda/gundar is used throughout South Asia to mean a thug and is said to be derived from this word.

Another theory, according to Vol. 3 of the Worldmark Encyclopedia of Cultures and Daily Life, is that the name was given to them by the Mughal dynasty of the 16th–18th centuries. It was the Mughals who first used the term "Gond", meaning "hill people", to refer to the group.

The Gonds call themselves Koitur (Kōītōr) or Koi (Kōī), which also has unclear origins but is perhaps related to kō, meaning "mountain". Other ethnonyms, like Kui, Kuvi, Koya, and Kubi (Konda endonym) are also said to be derived from it.

== History ==
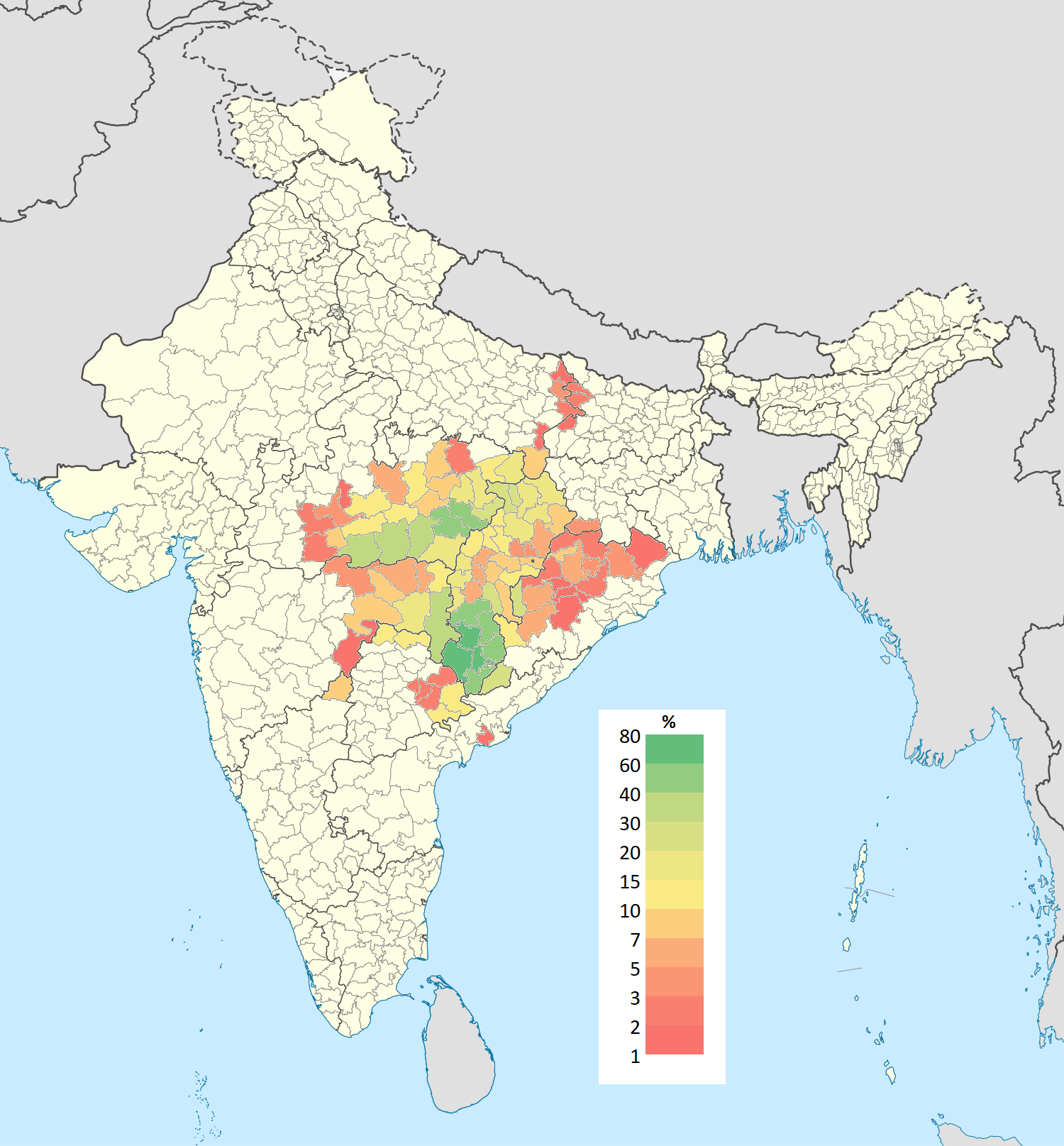
Percentage of Gondi tribes by districts in the 2011 census

The origins of the Gonds is unclear. Some researchers have claimed that the Gonds were a collection of disparate tribes that adopted a proto-Gondi language as a mother tongue from a class of rulers, originally speaking various pre-Dravidian languages. While there is an affinity between Gonds and Munda peoples, researchers point to a more complex event involving language shift through a Dravidian linguistic expansion, rather than a recent event of Gondi replacing a North Munda language, hence supporting distinct origins for these two groups.

R. V. Russell believed the Gonds came into Gondwana from the south: up the Godavari into Vidarbha, from there up the Indravati into Bastar, and up the Wardha and Wainganga into the Satpura Range.

The first historical reference to the Gonds appears in Muslim writings from the 14th century. Scholars believe the Gonds ruled Gondwana, a region extending from present-day eastern Madhya Pradesh to western Odisha, and from northern Telangana to the southeastern corner of Uttar Pradesh, between the 13th and 19th centuries CE.

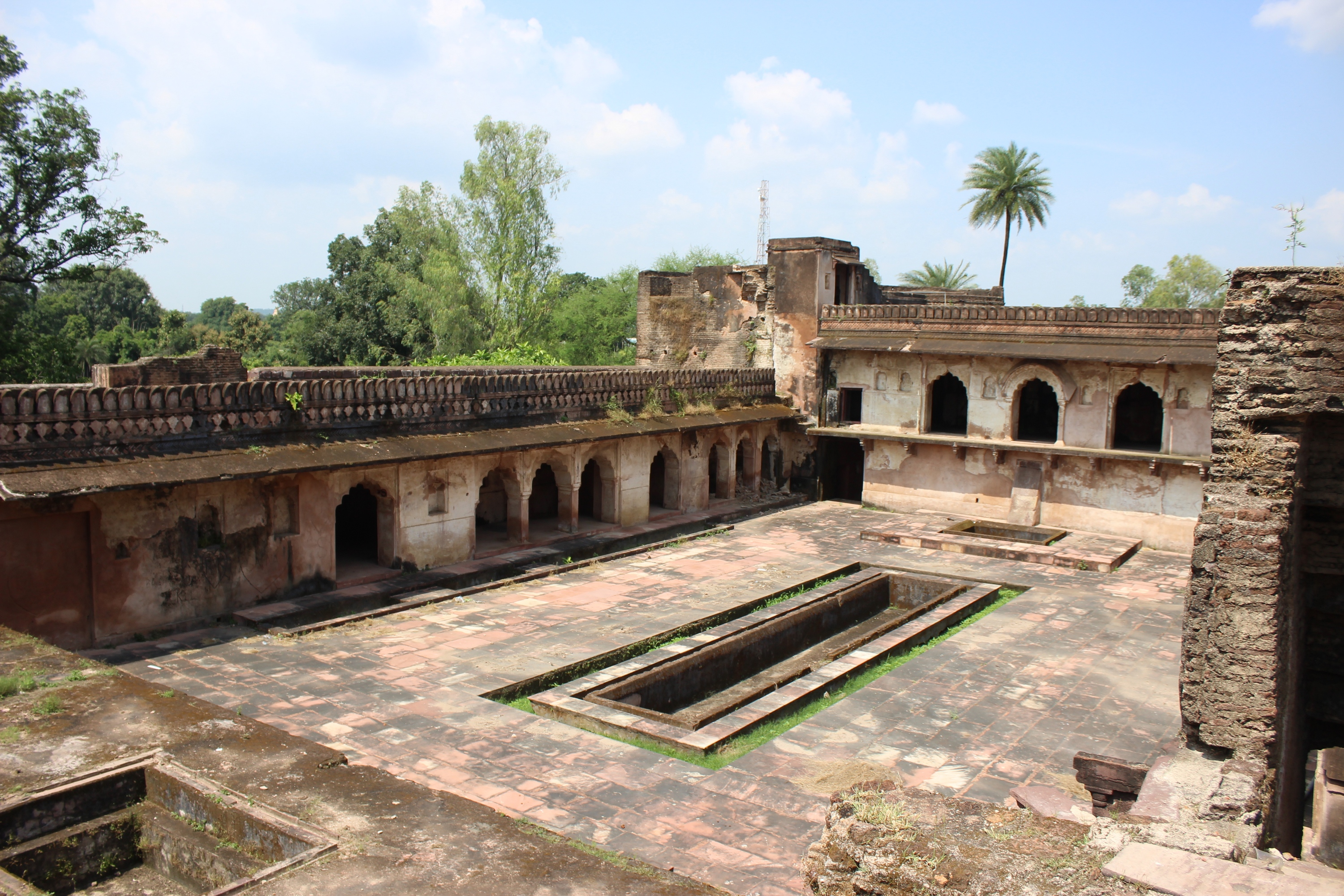
Gond palace, Bhopal

The first kingdom of the Gonds was that of Chanda, founded in 1200, although some genealogies trace its founders to the 9th century CE. The Gonds of Chanda originated from Sirpur in what is now northern Telangana and were said to have overthrown the previous rulers of the country, called the Mana dynasty. Another theory states that after the downfall of the Kakatiyas in 1318, the Gonds of Sirpur had the opportunity to throw off outside domination and built their own kingdom. The kingdom of Chanda developed extensive irrigation and the first defined revenue system of the Gond kingdoms. It also began to build forts, which later became highly sophisticated. Khandakhya Ballal Shah founded the town of Chandrapur and shifted the capital there from Sirpur. The Ain-i-Akbari records the kingdom as being fully independent, and it even conquered some territory from nearby sultanates. However, during Akbar's rule, Babji Shah began paying tribute after the Mughals incorporated territory to their south into the Berar Subah.

The Garha kingdom was founded in the 14th century by Jadurai, who deposed the previous Kalachuri rulers. Garha-Mandla is known for queen Rani Durgavati, who fought against Mughal emperor Akbar (d. 1564). Mandla was then ruled by her son Bir Narayan, who similarly fought until he died. Afterward, his kingdom was offered to Chanda Shah by the victorious Mughals. During Shah Jahan's reign, his successor Hirde Shah was attacked by the Bundelas and shifted the capital to Mandla. His successors fought against themselves and invited the aid of Aurangzeb and the Marathas to their cause.

Deogarh was founded in the early 13th century. It is said that its founder, Jatba, slew the previous Gauli rulers during a temple festival. In the Ain-i-Akbari, Deogarh was said to have 2,000 cavalry, 50,000 footmen, and 100 elephants and was ruled by a monarch named Jatba. Jatba built outposts in the Berar plains, including a fort near modern Nagpur. It was his grandson who, in order to enlist Aurangzeb's help, converted to Islam and became Bakht Buland Shah. Shah founded the city of Nagpur and brought a revival of the fortunes of the Deogarh kingdom. During his reign, the kingdom covered the southeastern Satpura range from Betul to Rajnandgaon in the east, and parts of the northern Berar plains. Under his son Chand Sultan, Nagpur gained even more importance.

These kingdoms were briefly conquered by the Mughals, but eventually, the Gond rajas were restored and were simply under Mughal suzerainty. In the 1740s, the Marathas began to attack the Gond rajas, causing both rajas and subjects to flee from the plains to the forests and hills. Raghoji Bhonsle forced the Gond rajas of Garha-Mandla to pay tribute to him. Marathi caste groups quickly replaced the displaced original population. Maratha occupation of the Gond rajas' territory continued until the Third Anglo-Maratha War, when the British took control over the remaining Gond zamindaris and took over revenue collection. The British, who regarded the Gonds as "plunderers" and "thieves" before their takeover, began to view the Gonds as "timid" and "meek" by the mid-19th century. The remaining Gond zamindaris were absorbed into the Indian union upon independence.

During colonial rule, the Gonds were marginalised by colonial forest management practices. The Bastar rebellion of 1910, better known in the tribal belt as the bhumkal, was a partly successful armed struggle against colonial forest policy that denied the Madia and Muria Gonds of Bastar, along with other tribes in the region, access to the forest for their livelihoods. In the early 1920s, Komaram Bheem, a Gond leader from Adilabad in Hyderabad state, rebelled against the Nizam and sought a separate Gond raj. It was he who coined the well-known slogan jal, jangal, jameen ("water, forest, land") that has symbolised Adivasi movements since independence.

In 1916, Gondi intellectuals from various parts of Gondwana formed the Gond Mahasabha to protect Gondi culture from increasing outside influence. The organisation held meetings in 1931 and 1934 to discuss ways to preserve Gond culture from manipulation by outsiders, social norms the Gonds should have, and solidarity between the Gonds of different parts of Gondwana. Starting in the 1940s, various Gond leaders agitated for a separate state that would encompass the erstwhile territory of Gondwana, especially tribal areas of eastern Madhya Pradesh and Chhattisgarh, Vidharbha, and Adilabad. The demand reached its peak in the early 1950s, when Heera Singh founded the Bharatiya Gondwana Sangh to agitate for statehood. Singh held many meetings throughout Gondwana and could mobilise 100,000 people between 1962 and 1963, but his movement had died down by the late 1960s and was never taken seriously by the Indian authorities. Other methods of agitation, including petitions and demands by various Gond organisations, were ignored by the state. In the 1990s, Heera Singh Markam and Kausalya Porte founded the Gondwana Ganatantra Party to fight for statehood.

The Gond rajas used Singh or Shah as titles, influenced by the Rajputs and Mughals. The Gond are also known as the Raj Gond. The term was widely used in the 1950s but has now become almost obsolete, probably because of the political eclipse of the Gond rajas.

== Society ==
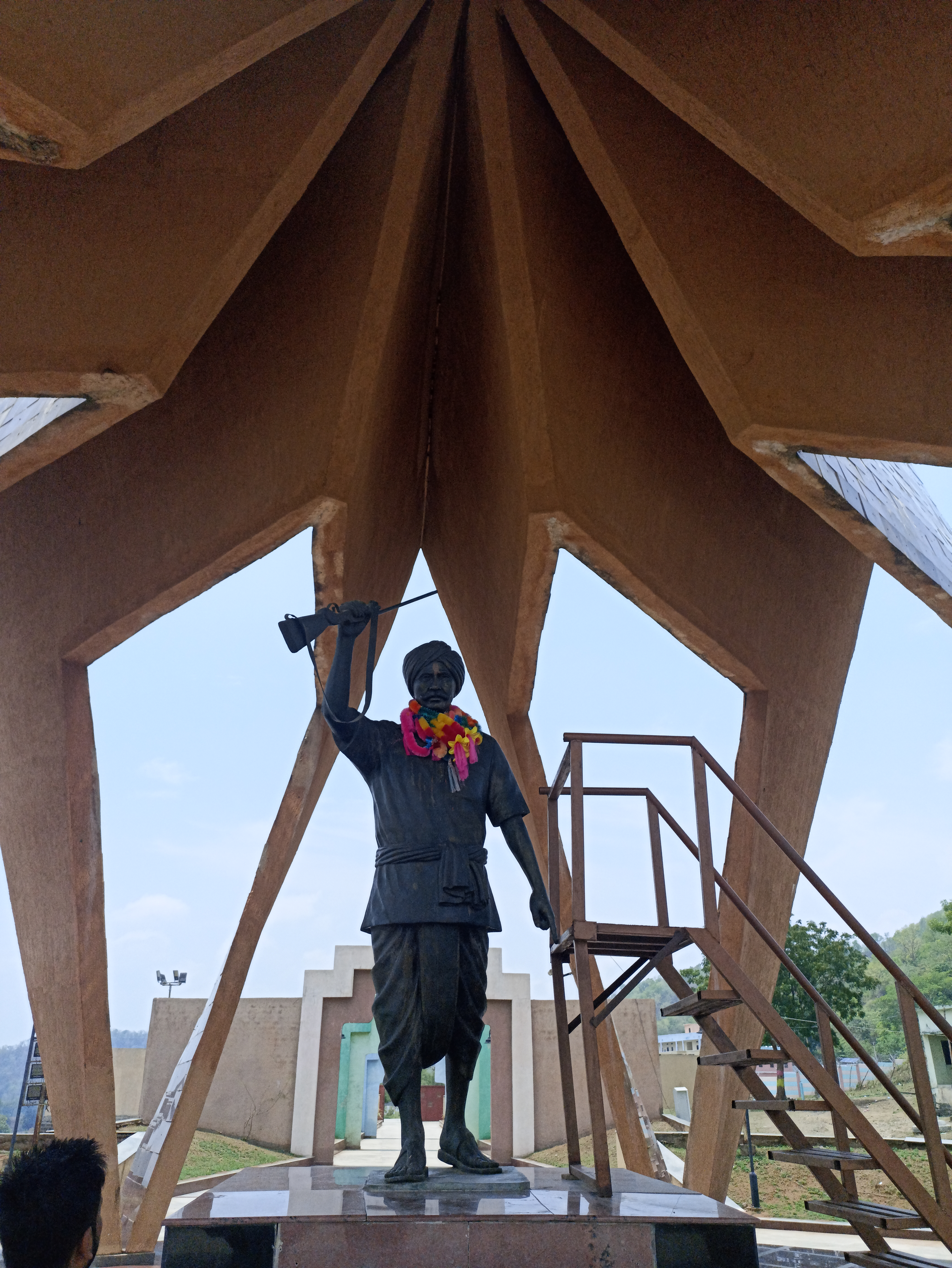
Komaram Bheem statue at the Kumuram Bheem Tribal Museum in Jodeghat

Gond society is divided into several exogamous patrilineal units known as sagas. The number depends on the region, with Gonds in the hills of Madhya Pradesh and the northern Nagpur plain having only two and those in the southern Nagpur plain and Adilabad having four. In Adilabad, these Sagas are called Yerwen, Sarwen, Siwen, and Nalwen, and their names refer to the number of ancestors for that saga. (Note: 'Yerlung' means seven, 'sarlung' six, 'silung' five, and 'nalung' means four in Gondi) In Adilabad, there is a fifth saga, Sarpe saga, which for marriage purposes is linked with Sarwen, although their origin myths are different. According to Gond mythology, all sagas once lived in a single village but soon moved out and established individual villages. The names of these ancestral villages are preserved in culture and sometimes identified with present-day locations. The number of ancestors for each saga is its symbol, and on many ceremonial and ritual occasions, the number of involved animals, people, actions, or objects corresponds to that saga's number.

The saga exists mostly in the sphere of ritual and has no real political or organizational significance. The most visible sign of saga consciousness is in the worship of Persa Pen, although this occurs mainly at the clan level. All worshippers of the same Persa pen see themselves as agnatically related, and so any intermarriage or sexual relations between them is forbidden. Gonds use the term soira to refer to sagas whose members they can marry.

Each saga is regarded as performing actions essential to society as a whole. During ceremonies and ritual events, the saga becomes important for determining roles in the proceedings. For instance, in the worship of a clan's Persa pen, the clan priest is involved in sacrifice while two members of a soira saga to the celebrating clan dress the idol and cook the sacrificial food. During certain parts of Gond festivals, participants divide into saga or soira. For serving the sacrificial meal at Persa Pen, members of each saga sit separately and are served in order of which their ancestors emerged from the cave in their origin story. However, all sagas have equal status in Gond society. Members of each saga work cooperatively on issues affecting their relationship with other sagas, such as negotiations about bride price in marriage. In addition, for ritual purposes, any person can be replaced by someone of the same age, generation, and saga. As an example, in a marriage where, for instance, the bride's parents are not present, a couple from the same saga as the bride can stand in for the bride's parents in the ritual. This applies also to the relations between Gonds and Pardhans: if a Pardhan of the same clan is not found, then a Pardhan belonging to a different clan in the same saga can be brought in as a suitable replacement.

Subdivided within the saga is the pari, or clan, the main unit of organisation of Gond society. In each saga, the number of clans is determined by the number of ancestors of that saga. The clans of a saga are arranged by precedence based on when they emerged from the cave in the Gond creation story. This precedence regulates behaviour during some rituals. For instance, during the First Fruit festival, all members of a saga eat with the seniormost member of the seniormost pari of the saga represented in the village. Group relations between senior and junior pari are based on relations between older and younger brothers. For instance, members of a senior pari cannot marry a widow from a junior pari, since it is seen as analogous to the marriage between an elder brother and a younger brother's wife. Clans generally have names relating to specific plants. Some common pari include Tekam, Uikey, Markam, Dhurwe, and Atram.

Each clan is divided into several parallel lineages, called kita. Each of these kita has a specific ritual function within Gond society: for instance, the katora kita is the only kita that presides over the worship of Persa Pen. Kita in some clans use Maratha titles like Deshmukh, bestowed on certain Gond chiefs. The kita functions only in the ritual sphere. Sometimes, the clans are also divided into khandan, or subclans, which are generally organic in nature. Each khandan is like a mini-clan, in that it has its own set of ritual objects for worship of Persa Pen and is formed when a group in a pari including a katora decide to set up a new centre for worship of Persa Pen. Eventually, this group becomes solidified into a khandan.

== Culture ==
Many astronomical ideas were known to ancient Gonds, who had their own local terms for the Sun, Moon, Milky Way, and constellations. Most of these ideas served as the basis for their timekeeping and calendrical activities. (Note: The Banjaras and Kolams are also known to have had knowledge of astronomy.)

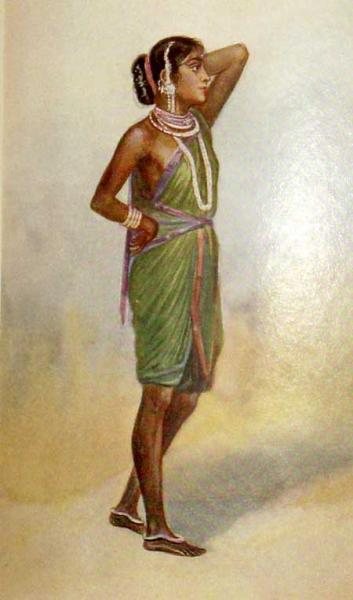
1928 painting of a Gond woman by M. V. Dhurandhar

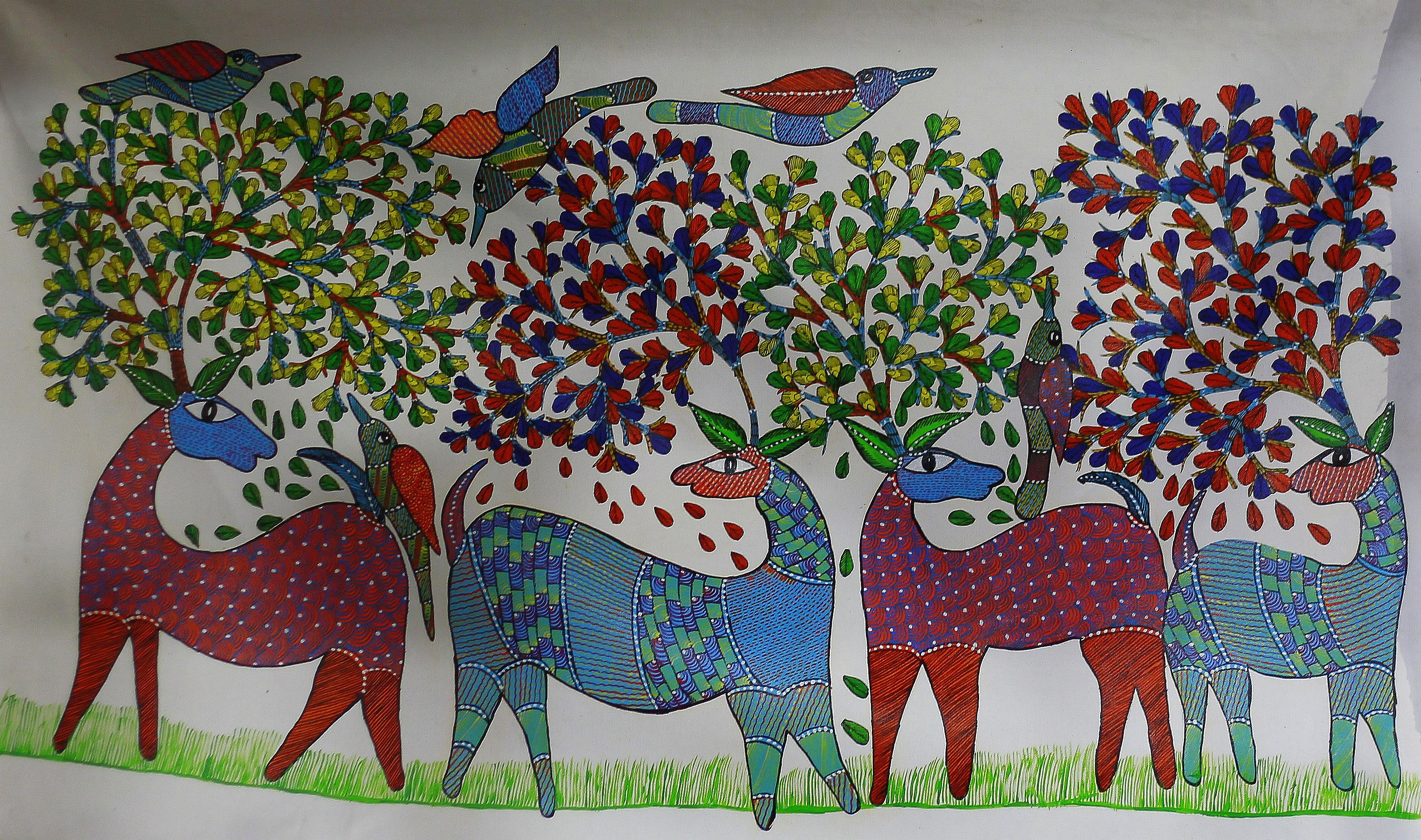
Gond art

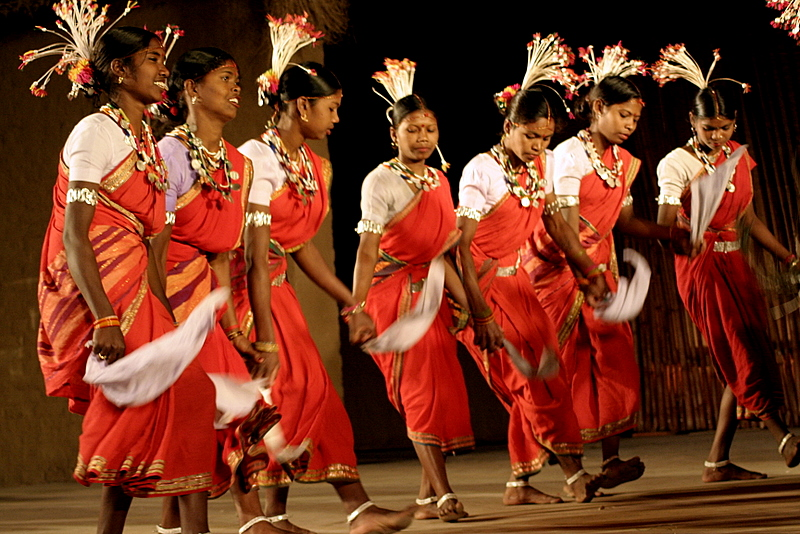
Saila and Karma dance by Gonds

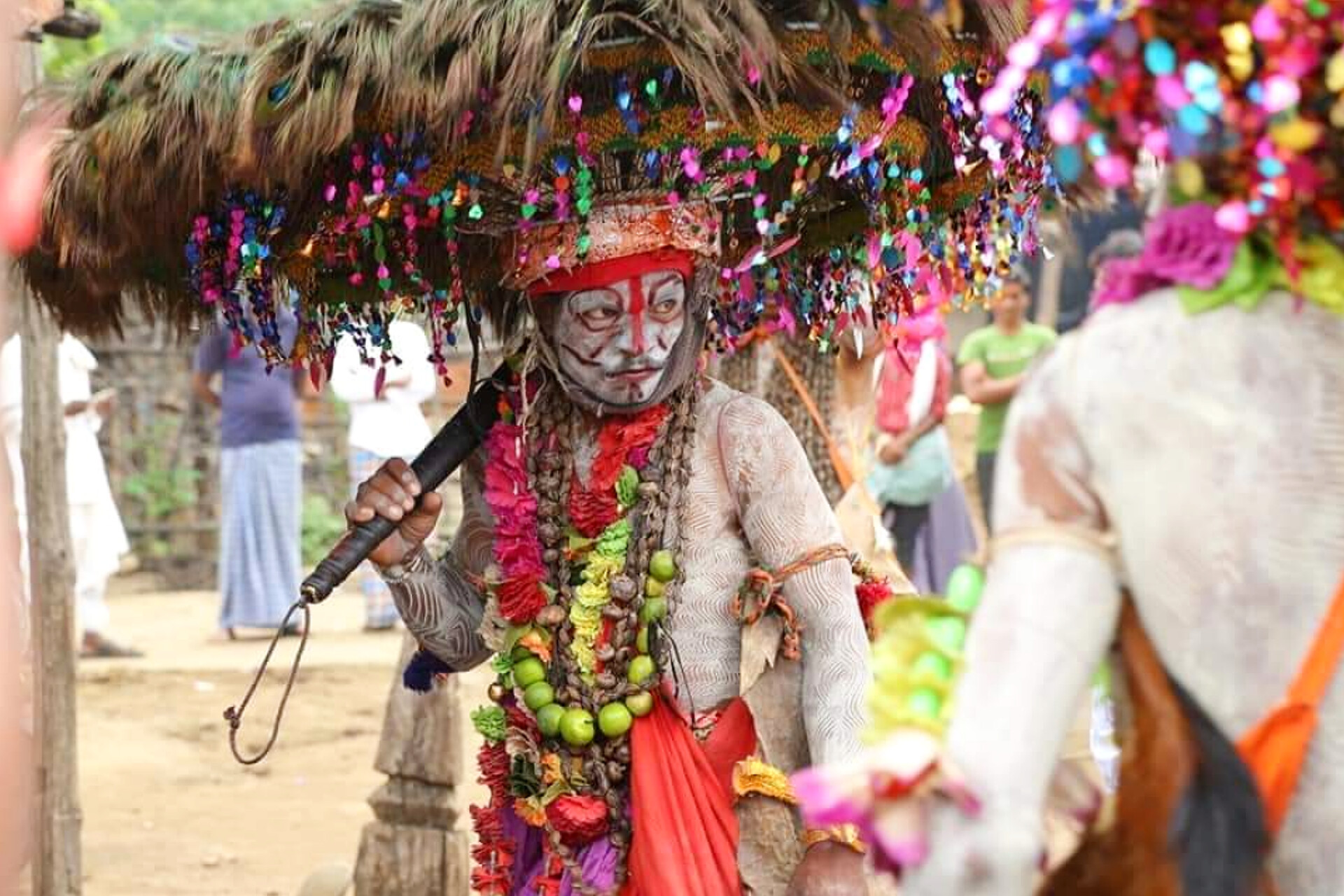
Dandari festival of Rajgonds, Adilabad

The Gondi language is spoken by almost 3 million people, mainly in the southern area of the Gond range. This area encompasses the southeastern districts of Madhya Pradesh, eastern Maharashtra, northern Telangana, and southern Chhattisgarh (mainly in the Bastar division). The language is related to Telugu. In the early 20th century, it was spoken by 1.5 million people, nearly all of whom were bilingual. At present, the language is only spoken by one fifth of Gonds and is dying out, even in its traditional linguistic range.

In Chhattisgarh, women perform the sua dance, which was named after the word for "parrot". It is performed after Diwali to honour Shiva and Parvati, representing the belief that the parrot will bring their sadness to their lovers.

Diwali is a major festival for Adilabad's Gond tribes, which they celebrate with the traditional Gussadi dance, donning peacock-feathered turbans, saffron attire, and joining in festive groups.

The Gondi people have their own version of the Ramayana, known as the Gond Ramayani, derived from oral folk legends. It consists of seven stories with Lakshmana as the protagonist, set after the main events of the Ramayana, where he finds a bride.

== Religion ==
Traditional Gondi music performance

According to the 2011 census, there were 1,026,344 followers of the "Gondi" religion in India, with the majority residing in Madhya Pradesh (584,884), followed by Chhattisgarh (368,438), Maharashtra (66,857), Uttar Pradesh (3,419), and Jharkhand (2,419). The majority of Gond people still follow their own traditions of nature worship, but like many other tribes in India, their religion has been influenced by Brahminical Hinduism.

Many Gond people practice their own indigenous religion, Koyapunem, while some follow Sarnaism. Pola, Phag, and Dassera are some of their major festivals. A small number of Gonds are Christian or Muslim.

=== Hinduism ===
In medieval times, the Gondi kingdoms worshipped Vishnu as their patron deity.

The Gonds worship ancestral deities known as Angadevs, which Brahminical Hindus claim are a representation of the goddess Mahakali. There were seven groups of Angadevs, rescued by Pari Kupar Lingo from the Kachchargardh caves. In one version, there were twenty-eight Angadevs, and in another, there were thirty-three.

In the second version, the Angadevs, or Saga Deva, were the children of the goddess Mata Kali Kankali after she ate a flower given to her by a sage. They were raised in Raitad Jungo's ashram, and while they were playing, they met the gods Shambu and Gaura. Gaura offered them food, but because they were annoyed by the children's mischief, Shambu and Gaura imprisoned them in the Kachchargardh caves. For twelve years, the children relied on a pond and a mythical bird who provided them food to survive. Kali Kankali pleaded to Shambu to release her children, but he rejected her pleas. Raitad Jungo then asked Pari Kupar Lingo to help him free the children, and Pari Kupar Lingo approached the bard Hirasuka Patalir. Patalir played music on his kingri, and the children were filled with strength to push the boulder blocking the caves from the outside world. Patalir was then crushed by the boulder. Ever since, the Kachchargardh caves became a site of pilgrimage, and Kali Kankali became one of the dharmagurus of the Gondi people.

A typical Gond reaction to death has been described as one of anger, because they believe death is caused by demons. Gonds usually bury their dead, together with their worldly possessions, but due to partial Hinduization, their kings were occasionally cremated, as per Vedic practices. Hinduization has led to cremation becoming more common.

=== Koyapunem ===
The native Gond religion, Koyapunem (meaning "the way of nature"), was founded by Pari Kupar Lingo. It is also known as Gondi Punem, or "the way of the Gondi people". Pari Kupar Lingo is also called Padda Devudu, i.e., Shiva.

In Gond folk tradition, adherents worship a high god known as Baradeo, whose alternate names are Bhagavan, Kupar Lingo, Badadeo, and Persa Pen. Baradeo oversees activities of lesser gods such as clan and village deities as well as ancestors. Baradeo is respected but he does not receive fervent devotion, which is shown only to clan and village deities, ancestors, and totems. These village deities include Aki Pen, the village guardian and the anwal, the village mother goddess, a similar paradigm to folk traditions of other Dravidian peoples. Before any festival occurs, these two deities are worshipped. Each clan has their own persa pen, meaning "great god". This god is benign at heart but can display violent tendencies. However, these tendencies are reduced when a pardhan, a bard, plays a fiddle.

Three people are important in Gond religious ceremonies: the baiga (village priest), the bhumka (clan priest), and the kaser-gaita (leader of the village).

As Kupar Lingo, the high god of the Gonds is depicted as a clean-shaven young prince wearing a trident-shaped crown, the munshul, which represents the head, heart, and body. There are many shrines to Kupar Lingo in Gondwana, and he is revered as an ancestral hero.

Per Gond religious beliefs, their ancestor Rupolang Pahandi Pari Kupar Lingo was born as the son of the chief Pulsheev, during the reign of Sambhu-Gaura, several thousand years ago. Kupar Lingo became the ruler of the Koya race and established the Gondi Punem, a code of conduct and philosophy that the Gondi practice. He gathered thirty-three disciples to teach the Gondi Punem to the distant lands of the koyamooree.

A principle in the Gond religion is munjok, which is non-violence, cooperation, and self-defense. Another part of Gond belief is salla and gangra, which represent action and reaction, superficially similar to the concept of karma in Hinduism. To prevent people from destroying themselves in conflict and discord, they are supposed to live under Phratrial society. Among the beliefs related to Phratrial society are the need to defend the community from enemies, working together and being in harmony with nature, and being allowed to eat animals (but not those representing a totem).

Like village deity worship in South India, Gonds believe their clan and village deities have the capability of possession. A person possessed by the spirit ceases to have any responsibility for their actions. Gonds also believe disease is caused by spirit possession.

Many Gonds worship Ravana, whom they consider to be the tenth dharmaguru of their people, the ancestor-king of one of their four lineages and the eightieth lingo (great teacher). On Dussehra, Gondi inhabitants of Paraswadi in Gadchiroli district carry an image of Ravana riding an elephant in a procession to worship him and "protest" the burning of his effigies. (Note: The Gonds' worship of Ravana is also a vehicle for resisting pressure from Christian missionaries and right-wing Hindutva groups, and to preserve the distinct Gond culture.)

Gonds venerate plants and animals, especially the saja tree. In some places, death is associated with a saja (Terminalia elliptica) tree. Stones representing souls of the dead, or hanals, are kept in a hanalkot at the foot of a saja tree. When there is no specific shrine for the village mother goddess, the saja tree is her abode. In addition, the Penkara, or holy circle of the clan, is under this tree. Gonds in Seoni believe Baradeo lives in a saja tree. The Mahua plant, whose flowers produce a liquor considered purifying, is also revered. In many Gond weddings, the bride and groom circle a post made out of a Mahua tree during the ceremony, and the Gonds of Adilabad perform the first ceremonies of the year when Mahua flowers bloom.

Gonds also believe in rain gods. One early British anthropologist noted how during the pre-monsoon hunting ceremony, the amount of blood spilled by the animals was indicative of the amount of rain to follow.

The gods are known as pen in the singular and pennoo in the plural. Other gods worshipped by the Gonds include:

- Mata Kali Kankali, the ancestral mother of the Gondi forefathers. She is associated with Mahakali.
- Dulha-Pen, the bridegroom god. He is represented by a stone, a man riding a horse, or a battle-axe.
- Gansam, the protector of villages from tigers. He is represented by a stone on the village boundary or a platform and a pole. Animals were sacrificed to him.
- Hardul, the god of weddings
- Bhimsen or Bhimal, the god of strength and the earth. He is associated with rocks, mountains, and rivers, and certain hills and rocks are considered holy sites of Bhimsen.
- Nat Awal or Dharti Mata, the goddess of fertility
- Bhumi, the earth and mother of humanity
- Nat Auwal, the mother goddess of the village. She is invoked when the village partakes in a ceremony, from seasonal rites to prayers against disasters.
- Thakur Dev, the male guardian of the village
- Hulera-Pen, the protector of cattle
- Maitya-Pen, the demon of whirlwinds
- Narayan-Pen, the sun god
- Kodapen, the horse god
- Maswasi Pen, the hunting god
- Kanya, water spirits

== Classification ==
Gondi people are designated as a Scheduled Tribe in Andhra Pradesh, parts of Uttar Pradesh, Bihar, Chhattisgarh, Gujarat, Jharkhand, Madhya Pradesh, Maharashtra, Telangana, Odisha, and West Bengal.

The Government of Uttar Pradesh had classified them as a Scheduled Caste, but by 2007, they were one of several groups that was redesignated as Scheduled Tribes. As of 2017, that tribal designation applies only to certain districts, not the entire state. The 2011 Census of India for Uttar Pradesh showed the Gond population at 21,992.

== In popular culture ==
Gondi people have been portrayed in the 2017 Amit V. Masurkar film Newton and in S.S. Rajamouli's 2022 blockbuster RRR, in which N. T. Rama Rao Jr. plays a fictionalised version of the Gond tribal leader Komaram Bheem.

Some people have speculated that the plot of the 2021 film Skater Girl is based on the life of Gond skateboarder Asha Gond. The film's writer and director, Manjari Makijany, has denied this, however.

== Notable people ==
- Komaram Bheem, freedom fighter
- Gunda Dhur, tribal leader
- Ramji Gond, tribal chief
- Asha Gond, skateboarder
- Hridayshah, king of Garha
- Ajanbahu Jatbasha, founder of the Gonds of Deogarh dynasty
- Motiravan Kangali, linguist and author
- Kanaka Raju, gusadi dancer
- Bakht Buland Shah, Rajgond ruler
- Dalpat Shah, 49th ruler of the Garha Kingdom.
- Raghunath Shah, freedom fighter
- Sangram Shah, king of Garha
- Shankar Shah, freedom fighter
- Baburao Shedmake, tribal freedom fighter
- Bhajju Shyam, painter
- Jangarh Singh Shyam, painter
- Venkat Shyam, artist
- Chakradhar Singh, raja of Raigarh State
- Karunkar Singh, freedom fighter
- Nareshchandra Singh, first Scheduled Tribe Chief Minister of Madhya Pradesh
- Veer Narayan Singh, activist
- Durga Bai Vyom, artist
