= Komaram Bheem =

Indian tribal leader (1900–1940)

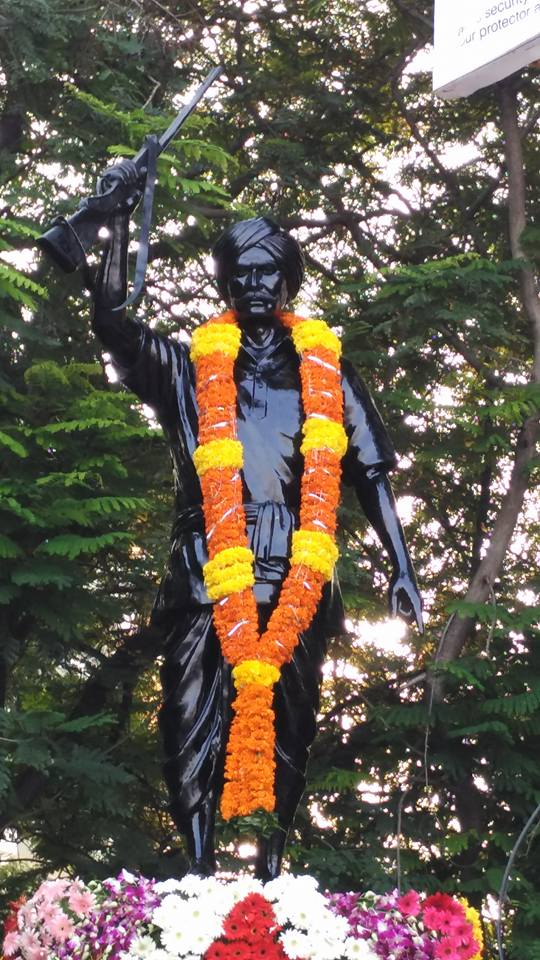
- Statue of Komaram Bheem at Tank Bund Road, Hyderabad
- Born: 22 October 1901; Sankepalli, Hyderabad State, British Raj (present day Telangana, India)
- Died: c.27 October 1940 (aged 38 or 39); Jodeghat, Hyderabad State, British Raj
- Years active: 1928–1940
- Known for: Rebellion against the Hyderabad State
- Spouse: Som Bai

Komaram Bheem (1901–1940), alternatively Kumram Bheem, was a revolutionary leader in Hyderabad State of British Raj from the Gond tribes. Bheem, in association with other Gond leaders, led a protracted low intensity rebellion against the feudal Nizams of Hyderabad in the eastern part of the princely state during the 1930s, which contributed in the culmination of the Telangana Rebellion of 1946.

He was killed by armed policemen in 1940, subsequently lionised as a symbol of rebellion, and eulogised in Adivasi and Telugu folklore. Bheem is deified as a pen in Gond culture and is credited for coining the slogan Jal, Jangal, Zameen (transl. Water, Forest, Land) which, symbolising a sentiment against encroachment and exploitation, has been adopted by Adivasi movements as a call to action. He is also associated with the early part of the movement for Telangana statehood.

== Life ==
Komaram Bheem was born in Sankepalli, near Asifabad in Hyderabad State, British Raj to a family in the Gondi tribal community, on 22 October 1901. Bheem grew up in the tribal populated forests within the traditional kingdoms of Chanda and Ballalpur, isolated from the rest of the world and received no formal education. He kept moving from place to place throughout his life as the Gondi people were being increasingly victimised and exploited by zamindars (transl. landlords) and businessmen, and through extortion by the jangaalat police (transl. forest police).

During the 1900s, there was expansion of mining activities and strengthening of state authority in the Gondi region. Regulations introduced and enforced hampered the subsistence activities of the Gondis. Zamindars were granted lands in their regions and imposed taxes on Gondi podu farming activities, non-compliance often resulting in severe measures including forced amputations. Gondis began migrating from their traditional villages, the situation led to occasional retaliations and protests; Bheem's father was killed by forest officials in one such incident.

Following the death of his father, Bheem and his family moved out to Sankepalli to Sardapur near Karimnagar. The Gonds who had migrated to Sardapur settled in barren land owned by the zamindar Laxman Rao; they began subsistence farming on the land and subsequently became a target for tax extraction. In a confrontation in October 1920, Bheem killed a senior official of the Nizamate, Siddiquesaab who was sent by Rao to enforce the confiscation of crops during the time of harvest. To escape capture, he ran away on foot to the city of Chanda with his friend named Kondal (known variously as Routa Kondal, Komaram Kondal and Edla Kondal). The two were granted refuge by a local publisher Vitoba who operated a printing press and distribution network across the regional railways for an anti–British anti–Nizamate magazine. Bheem learned to speak and read English, Hindi and Urdu during time working with Vitoba.

Bheem was forced to run away again after Vitoba was arrested, on this occasion, to a tea plantation in Assam with an acquaintance at the Manchiryal railway station. He worked in the plantations for four and a half years. While doing so he became involved in labour union activities and was eventually arrested for such. Bheem escaped jail within four days, boarded a goods train and returned to Balharshah in the Nizamate. Bheem had heard of Ramji Gond in his childhood, so he decided to initiate his own struggle for the rights of the Adivasis on his return to the Nizamate. Bheem moved to Kakanghat with family and started working for Lacchu Patel who was the head of a village called Devadam. Leveraging his experience in Assam, he helped Patel in a land litigation against the Asifabad estate which made him well known in the nearby villages and in return he was granted permission by Patel to marry.

Bheem married a woman named Som Bai, moved to Bhabejhari in the interior of the Gond lands and settled down to cultivate a piece of land. During the time of harvest, he was again approached by forest officials who tried to force him to leave arguing that the land belonged to the state. Bheem then tried to lobby the Nizam directly and sought to present the grievances of the Adivasis before him but he received no response. Bheem then decided to engage in armed revolution. He formed clandestine associations with the banned Communist Party of India, and started mobilising the Adivasi population at Jodeghat, eventually calling a council of tribal leaders from the twelve traditional districts of Ankusapur, Bhabejhari, Bhimangundi, Chalbaridi, Jodeghat, Kallegaon, Koshaguda, Linepatter, Narsapur, Patnapur, Shivaguda and Tokennavada. The council decided to form a guerilla army to protect their lands. Bheem also proposed they declare themselves an independent Gond kingdom. Some see this as a predecessor to more recent attempts to form an autonomous Gondwana.

The council was followed by an uprising in the Gondi region which began in 1928. The forces mobilised to attack the zamindars in Babejhari and Jodeghat. In response, the Nizam recognised Bheem as leader of the Gond rebels and sent the collector at Asifabad to negotiate with him, offering assurances of land grants to the Gonds. Bheem rejected the initial offer stating that they sought justice and instead demanded regional autonomy for the Gonds, eviction of the forest officials and zamindars, and the release of all Gond prisoners in the penal system of Hyderabad state. The demands were rejected and the conflict continued as a low intensity guerilla campaign over the following decade. Bheem directly commanded 300 men under him and operated out of Jodeghat. He is said to have coined the slogan Jal, Jangal, Zameen (transl. Water, Forest, Land) during this period.

Bheem's whereabouts were eventually discovered by Kurdu Patel and he was killed in an encounter with armed policemen led by the talukdar of Asifabad, Abdul Sattar. Fifteen others were killed in the encounter. The date of his death is disputed, it's officially recognised to have occurred in October 1940 but Gondi people commemorate it on 8 April 1940.

== Legacy ==
Komaram Bheem was lionised as a symbol of the Gond rebellion following his death and, over the years, was eulogised into Adivasi and Telugu folk songs. Bheem has been deified among the animistic Gond Adivasi community through the worship of Bheemal Pen. His death anniversary is commemorated by the Gonds every year on Aswayuja Powrnami, where an event is organized at Jodeghat, the place of his death and his center of operations during the rebellion. His aides Bhadu master and Maru master are considered to have been instrumental in lionising him following his death, in order to motivate demoralised combatants.

Following the death of Bheem, the Hyderabad State employed the Austrian ethnologist Christoph von Fürer-Haimendorf to study the causes of the rebellion. Haimendorf's work enabled the enactment of the Hyderabad Tribal Areas Regulation 1356 Fasli in 1946. Haimendorf remarked at the time that "rebellions of aboriginal tribesmen against the authority of the government are among the most tragic conflicts between ruler and ruled" and that "it is always a hopeless struggle of the weak against the strong, the illiterate and uninformed against the organised power of a sophisticated system." The rebellion itself persisted for years after Bheem's death till it merged with the Telangana Rebellion, a peasants uprising led by the communists against the Nizamate.

Bheem's legacy was largely ignored in the mainstream beyond the folk culture of the impoverished Adivasis of central eastern India and the Telangana movement in Andhra Pradesh. His marginalised status in Indian mainstream history contrasted with his idolisation as a revolutionary figure among Adivasis, for whom he became an exemplification of their own marginalised and exploited status in India even after independence. The slogan of Jal, Jangal, Zameen, symbolising a sentiment against encroachment and exploitation, has been adopted by Adivasi communities, particularly the Gonds for their social and political struggles, including as a war cry in the Naxalite–Maoist insurgency. In popular culture, the film Komaram Bheem (1990) directed by Allani Sridhar was created based on his life and won two Nandi Awards.

In the 21st century, with growing support and prominence of the demand for the new state of Telangana, the legacy of Bheem was brought back into the spotlight and was featured in more mainstream political discourse and rhetoric. In 2011, the Andhra Pradesh government announced the construction of a dam and reservoir named Sri Komaram Bheem Project and the installation of a statue at Tank Bund Road in the city of Hyderabad. Following the establishment of the Telangana state in 2014, the state government allocated ₹25 crore (equivalent to ₹44 crore or US$4.7 million in 2026) for the construction of a Komaram Bheem museum for tribal history at Jodeghat and a memorial at Jodeghat hill rock. The museum and memorial were inaugurated in 2016, and in the same year the Adilabad district was reorganised, part of it carved out as the Komaram Bheem district. The location near Jodeghat has become a major tourism destination in Telangana.

In 2018, S. S. Rajamouli, the director of the Baahubali series, announced the film RRR to feature Komaram Bheem and his contemporary Alluri Sitarama Raju as characters, with N. T. Rama Rao Jr. playing the role of Bheem. The plot is a work of fiction depicting a friendship between the two contemporaries and taking place in the less documented part of their lives in the 1920s.

== See also ==
- Birsa Munda
- Sidhu and Kanhu Murmu
