= Bastar rebellion =

1910 tribal rebellion in British India

Bastar Rebellion
- Part of Tribal revolts in India before independence
Date	1910
Location	Bastar State, British India
Result	Rebellion suppressed

Belligerents
British Raj	Adivasis of Bastar State

Commanders and leaders
	Gunda Dhur; Lal Karendra Singh

The Bastar Rebellion, also known as the Bhumkal Movement, was an Adivasi rebellion in 1910 against the British Raj in the princely state of Bastar. Its central part is located on a plateau North of this plateau is Chhattisgarh plain and South of this plateau is Godavari plain. It was primarily led by Gunda Dhur, a tribal leader, as well as by a diwan and cousin of the king, Lal Karendra Singh. The tribals mobilized, which led to the entire state rising in revolt against the British colonial government, overwhelming the small 250-strong police force in the state, and was marked by widespread rioting, looting and arson. By the end of February, however, additional troops from neighbouring Jeypore and Bengal had quelled the revolt and arrested the leaders.

The primary cause of the rebellion, as was later discovered by several government reports examining the cause of the riots, were British colonial policies regarding usage of the forests. The British colonial government had begun reserving forests, which only allowed certain corporations to exploit forest resources. This resulted in the barring of tribals from using the forests for their livelihoods, and oftentimes, the displacement of tribal villages, which led to widespread resentment against the colonial government.

However, the British, and the post-independence Indian governments, continued to reserve forests, which led to the further displacement of tribals from their lands. The continuation of these policies, which have had a detrimental impact on Adivasi livelihood, has been a powerful factor for the intense Naxalite insurgency in the Bastar division of Chhattisgarh and the continuing tribal support to it.

== Background ==
Bastar was a princely state in central India, administered under the Central Provinces and Berar. In ancient times it was known as Dandakaranya (lit. stick forest), and was mentioned in the Ramayana. Today, it corresponds to the Bastar division of Chhattisgarh. The state covered an area of 33,830 km^{2} (13,060 square miles) and had its capital at Jagdalpur. In 1901, it had a population of 306,501. It is a tribal-dominated region, the main tribes being the Madia, Muria, Dorla, Duruwa, Halba and Bhatra. The Madia, Muria and Dorla are part of the larger Gond tribe formerly dominant in central India from the 14th to 18th centuries. However, the Bastar princely state was ruled by Rajputs who claimed descent from Annamaraja, a brother of the last Kakatiya King Prataparudra II, who fled to the region after the Delhi Sultanate conquered Warangal in the early 14th century. The state was tributary to the Mughals and Marathas, and after the Third Anglo-Maratha War, Bastar became a tributary of the East India Company.

Bastar is a land rich in natural resources, and the tribals have made the best use of their terrain to exploit that. Traditionally, the tribals practiced jhum agriculture, and so had an intimate relationship with the forest. Even after adopting settled agriculture, the tribals still relied heavily on collecting minor forest products such as tendu to supplement their livelihoods. However, starting in 1871, the British colonial government began interfering in this procedure by establishing reserve forests in areas especially rich in natural resources. This meant forest which had previously been in tribal hands became directly under state control, allowing the state to decide who was allowed to use the forest and its resources. Oftentimes the British colonial government, in order to exploit the valuable deposits of iron, rubber, tendu, timber, and precious minerals, would give corporations monopolies on exploiting the forest while imposing fees on the adivasis for collecting produce or grazing there. In many cases entire villages within reserve forest bounds were forcibly relocated. This was extended in 1908, when the reserve forest policy was expanded. Forest produce collected from this system was frequently sold at subsidised rates, meaning very little money would return to the forest or its labourers. Additionally, the British government refused to help diversify the tribal economy to make up for this difference. Thus the tribals became exploited labourers at the mercy of oftentimes-corrupt forest officials. In addition, tribal land was slowly being lost as the thekadari system was implemented: where tribals now became tenants on their own land and whole villages were leased. These policies caused significant hardship to tribals, who were now unable to supplement their incomes from farming. Therefore British forest policies would cause significant resentment in tribal communities.

The tribals of Bastar have a close relationship with their rulers. Since the rajas are the high priests of Maa Danteshwari, a goddess sacred to the Adivasis, there is a much closer relationship between the tribals and their rulers than a typical princely state. This is exemplified by the Bastar Dusshera celebrations, where the king is 'abducted' by the tribals on the 11th day and on the 12th is returned to the throne. This level of socioreligious significance held by the king meant any changes to the monarchy would be resisted by the tribals. The British began interfering with the administration by replacing officials, especially the diwan. In 1876, the resentment over changes to the monarchy boiled over when the diwan attempted to organize a meeting between the Prince of Wales, who had arrived in India, and the Raja of Bastar. The tribals feared this was an attempt at abduction, and so mobilized to prevent the raja from leaving the state. The people demanded the raja dismiss the current diwan and high court judge since they were oppressive and not leave them in charge of administration if he left. The "rebellion" was relatively bloodshed-free and died down. In 1891, after the death of Raja Pratap Deo and the succession of his 6 year-old son Rudra Pratap Deo, the British colonial government took the opportunity to start governing the princely state directly. Even after the raja gained maturity in 1908, Extra Commissioner Panda Bajinath, who had served as superintended for the past four years, became diwan and essentially forced the raja to follow his advice. Therefore the raja no longer had any real authority over his kingdom, and it was later remarked that the diwan was the de facto ruler.

Other hardships for the tribals included: an influx of outside traders into adivasi lands, such as Telugu and Chhattisgarhi moneylenders, who had exploitative relationships with the communities in which they worked, the exploitative system of begar, or forced labour, implemented by officials, suppression of their ghotul culture in the education system, and suppression of their traditional religion by banning home-brewing of alcohol.

== Rebellion ==
In 1908, troops attacked a Duruwa community near the capital of Jagdalpur, killing the inhabitants and committing acts of rape against the village women. The attack caused significant anger among the tribals, and for a year, the talk was all about their anger towards the colonial government, particularly in regards to their forest policies. Preparations were being made: weapons were collected and prepared and ghotul meetings were taking place, for 9 months, unnoticed by the administration. The rebellion had two forms of leadership. Covertly, the rebellion was led by Lal Karendra Singh, a former diwan who was very popular with the tribals. He was a cousin to the royal family, and wished to be ruler. He was supported by the senior rani, Kumari Devi, once questions about Rudra Pratap Deo's legitimacy were raised, and the tribals' faith in the raja was further reduced by the propaganda they led. On 22 October 1909, Singh held a meeting with the majhis of the tribals and they agreed to overthrow the colonial government. The council formed an overt leadership headed by Gunda Dhur, a Duruwa leader. For each region of the state they organized a group of tribal leaders. The plan was to set up an "Independent revolutionary government" led by Gunda Dhur that would take over once the foreign administration was deposed. The preparations were so secret that all the non-leaders knew was they should prepare for a bhumkal (earthquake). They would implement a surprise attack on the government, cut off communications with the outside, and capture as many officers as possible for hostages.

In January symbolic messages, consisting of red chilis, bows and arrows, mango leaves, lumps of earth, were sent all around the state to alert people to the coming war. On 31 January, the diwan came to know that "chilis were being circulated," and while the agent he was with continued towards Chanda, he attempted to return towards Jagdalpur. But on hearing about a Madia demonstration there, he went to Bijapur instead. On 6 February 1910, the date of the start of the rebellion, an assault group prepared to capture the diwan and destroy the state bureaucracy, but the Diwan escaped. Instead, the force killed his officers and searched the entire southern area for the diwan. The same day, violence erupted throughout the state. This violence was directed towards the forest officials and the "outsiders," especially moneylenders and traders. Their shops and houses were burnt and they were beaten and kicked out of the area. Until 13 February, the tribals practically ruled Bastar when government troops entered Jagdalpur and captured Singh.

Meanwhile the diwan, who had been alerted to the general rising of the Madias throughout south Bastar, fled to the neighbouring princely state of Chanda. The colonial government were alerted on 7 February of the uprising by Rudra Pratap Deo, who requested their assistance to deal with Madias and Murias who were "rioting". Also on 7 February, an assembly was held in Geedam near Dantewada by many of the Madia Gond leaders, as well as Gunda Dhur. The conclave captured Geedam and recaptured Barsur. The rebels mounted a week-long siege of Kutru. Overall, the rebels managed to take over most of the southeast of Bastar, helped by the mountainous terrain.

In the northwest of the state, rebel leaders began killing forest officials and moneylenders and arming their followers with guns. One Madia Gond leader, Aytu Para, who compared himself with Lingo, had taken over the Antagarh region. On 9 March, the Abhuj Madias attacked a British Indian Army force near Chhote Dongar led by Commander Drury. In a series of skirmishes and sieges, Drury was driven from the region into Narayanpur. Infuriated, he ordered a scorched-earth policy against the Abhujmarias, which proved successful in subduing them.
