= Duruwa =

Tribe of India

Dhurwa
- Dharua, Durua
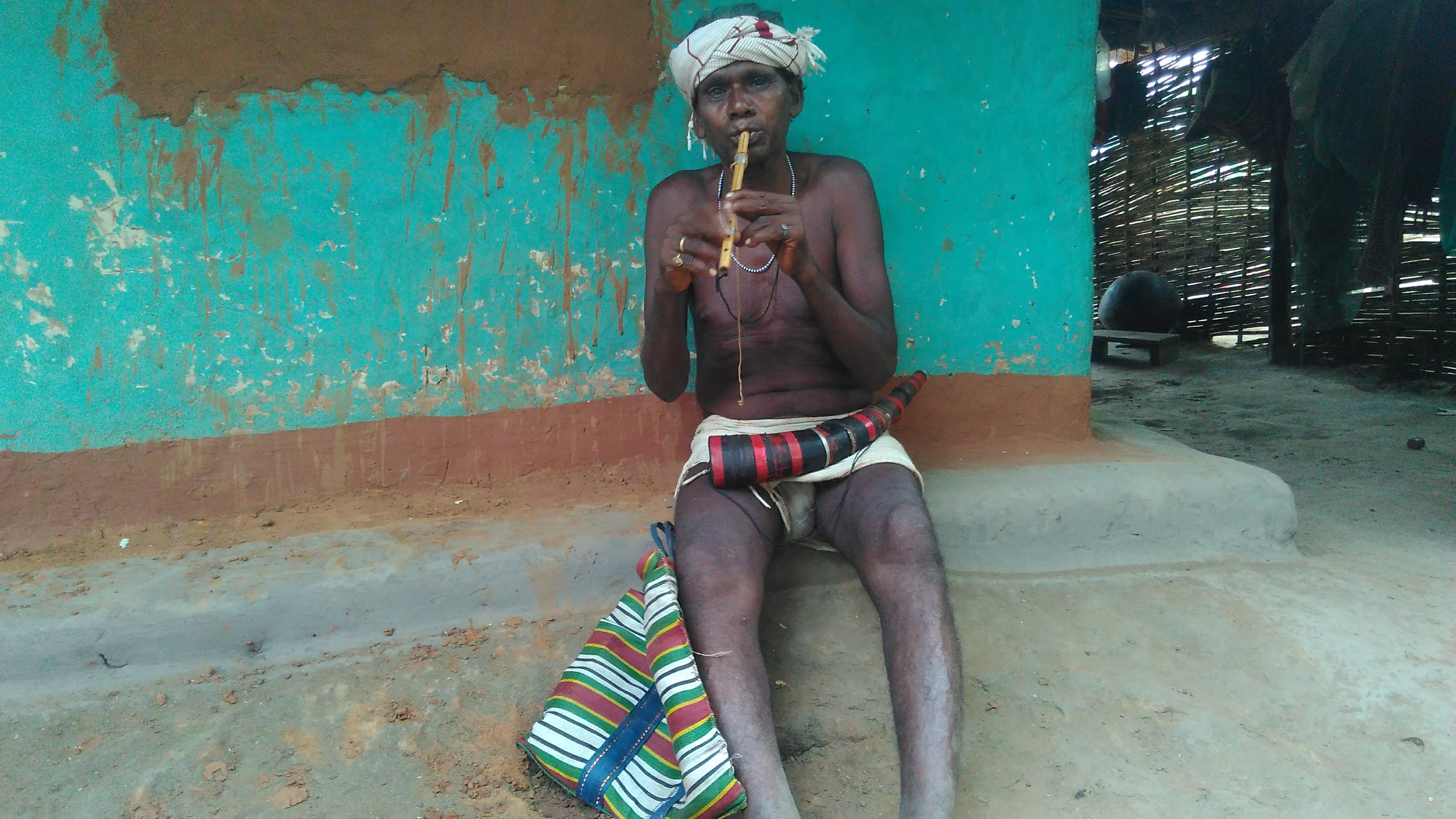
- Dhurwa man playing flute, Bastar district, Chhattisgarh
- Religions: Hinduism
- Languages: Parji & local lingua franca languages
- Country: India
- Populated states: Chhattisgarh, Odisha
- Population: Odisha – 18,151 (census 2011)
- Status: Scheduled Tribe

The Duruwa, Dhurwa or Dharua is a tribal group found in the Indian states of Chhattisgarh and Odisha. Parji, a Dravidian language, is used by the people in their home domain.

== Overview ==
Although Parji is their native language, they are well versed with the local lingua franca, Odia, Chhattisgarhi but also speak Hindi, Telugu, Kurmali and use Odia, Hindi or Telugu scripts for intergroup communication.

In Chhattisgarh Dharua people are classified under the Gond tribe, but in Odisha they are listed as a separate tribe.
