= Gussadi dance =

Indian rhythmic folk dance

Gussadi
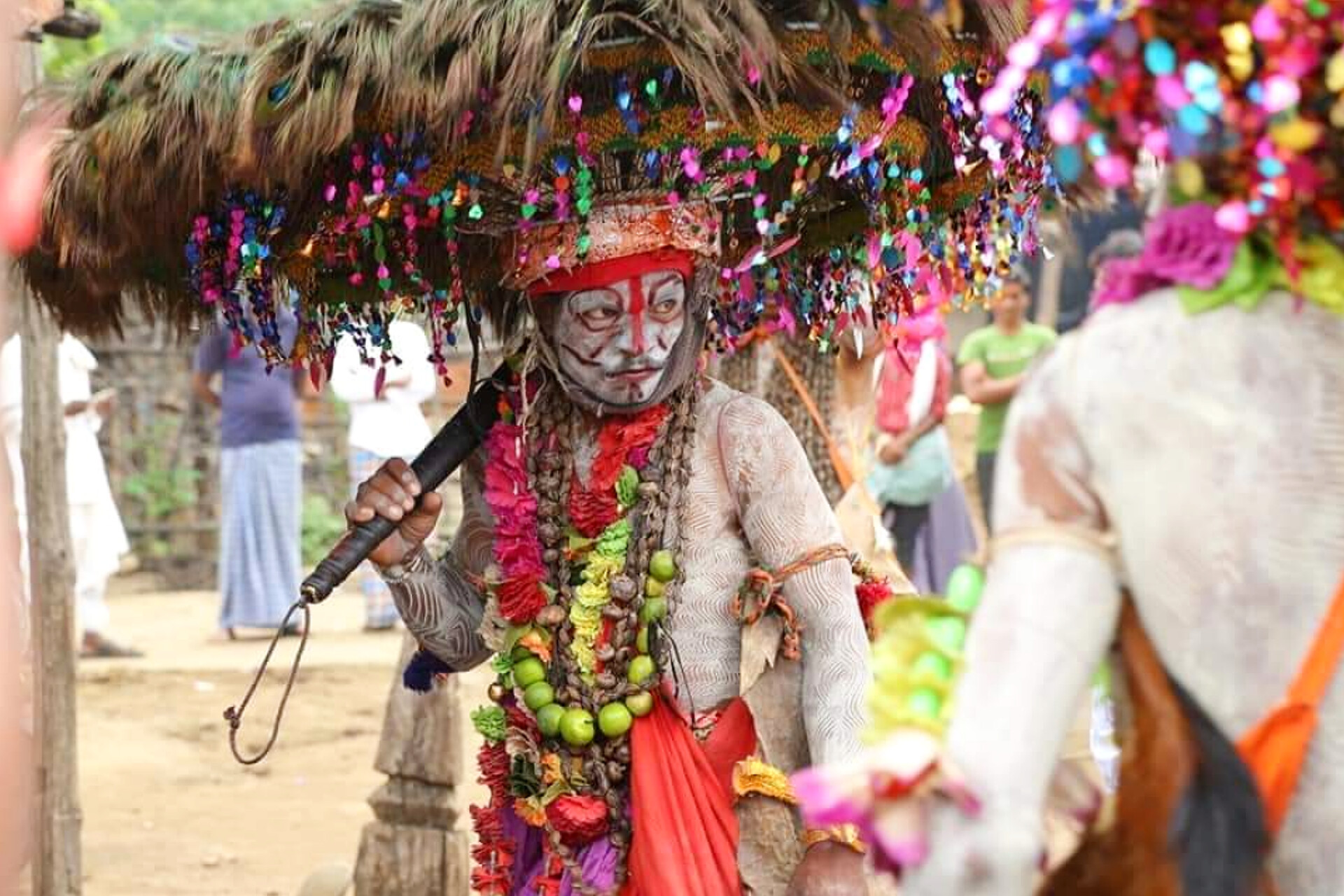
- A Gussadi dance artist wearing a peacock feather crown.
- Official name: Gussadi
- Also called: Gussadi Tado
- Observed by: Raj Gond tribes
- Type: Regional Folk Dance
- Celebrations: Dancing, singing, and community feasts
- Date: During the month of Diwali
- Duration: 9 days
- Frequency: Annual
- Related to: Dandari

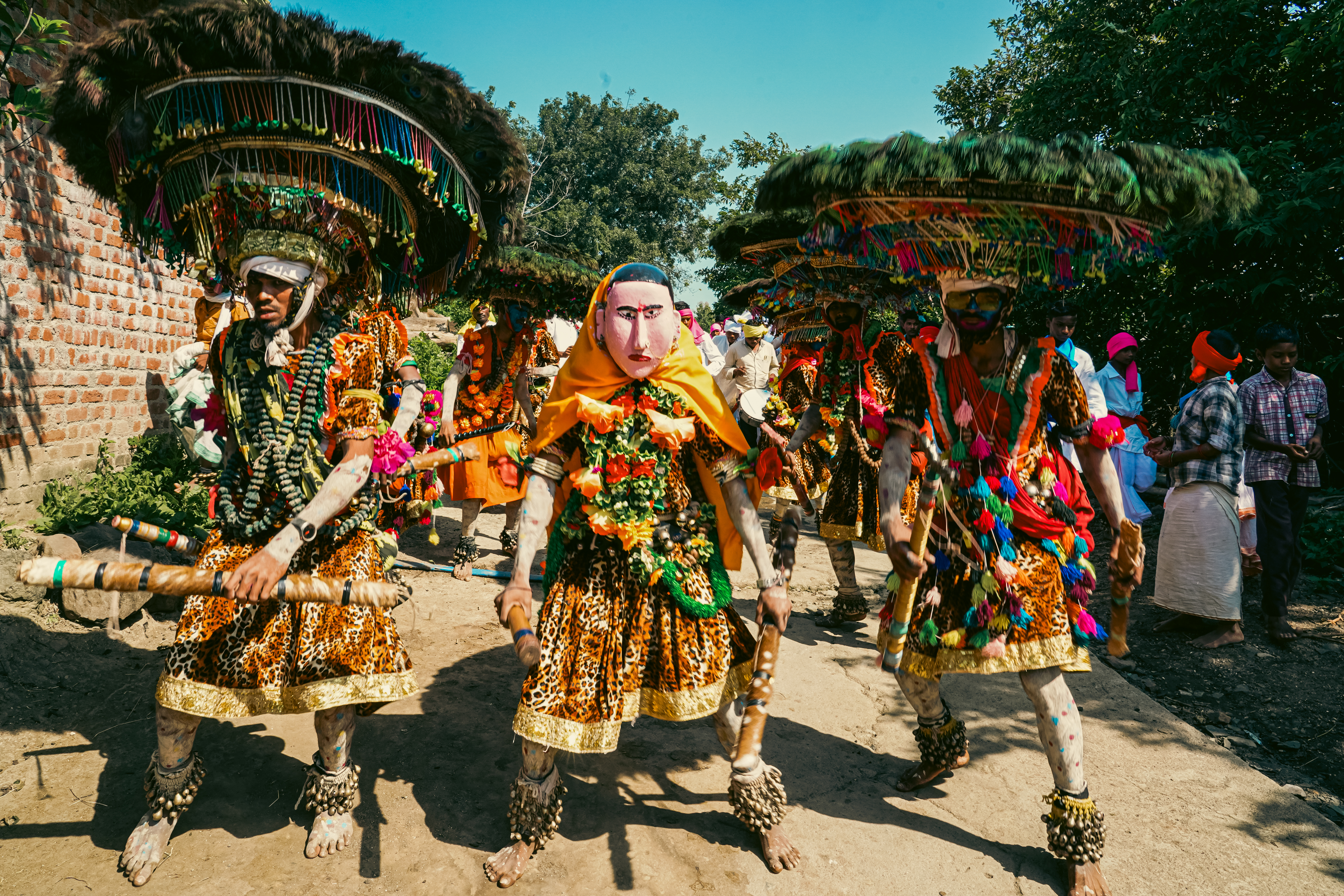
A scene from the Dandari Gussadi dance festival

The Gussadi dance is a traditional folk dance form deeply rooted in the cultural practices of the Raj Gond tribes, particularly in the Adilabad District of Telangana, India, as well as parts of Maharashtra. It is performed by Dandari dance troupes around the Diwali festival, at an event celebrated annually by the Gond tribes and typically lasting between five and nine days.

The festival is considered by its attendees as a key cultural and religious event for the tribal communities. Kanaka Raju is seen as popularising the rhythmic dance form in 1982 when he performed it for Prime Minister Indira Gandhi in a highly watched setting. Raju received the padma shri, India's fourth highest civilian award, in 2021 for his contributions to promoting the gussadi dance.

== Dandari festival and dance performance ==
The Gond people are believed to be one of the oldest tribes in India. The Gussadi dance is perceived as a means for them celebrate their history and perform devotions to their local gods.

The Dandari-Gussadi dance festival starts with the day of Bhogi by worshipping the local goddess Padmalpuri Kako Etmasur and some of the instruments used in the Gussadi dance such as the parra, vette and kodal. After the prayers, the men put on specific clothes for the Gussadi dance, which they believe will instill them with holiness for the duration of the festival.

The final day of the festival features a ritual called Kolabodi. During this period, Dandari troupes consisting of men and women travel from one village to another performing the gussadi and other traditional dances. The dancers wear elaborately decorated dresses and ornaments, including turbans adorned with peacock feathers, deer horns, artificial moustaches and beards as well as saffron and yellow coloured dresses. They also wear garlands and straps on their legs and waist, carrying the crew as they dance in rhythm to tribal instruments.

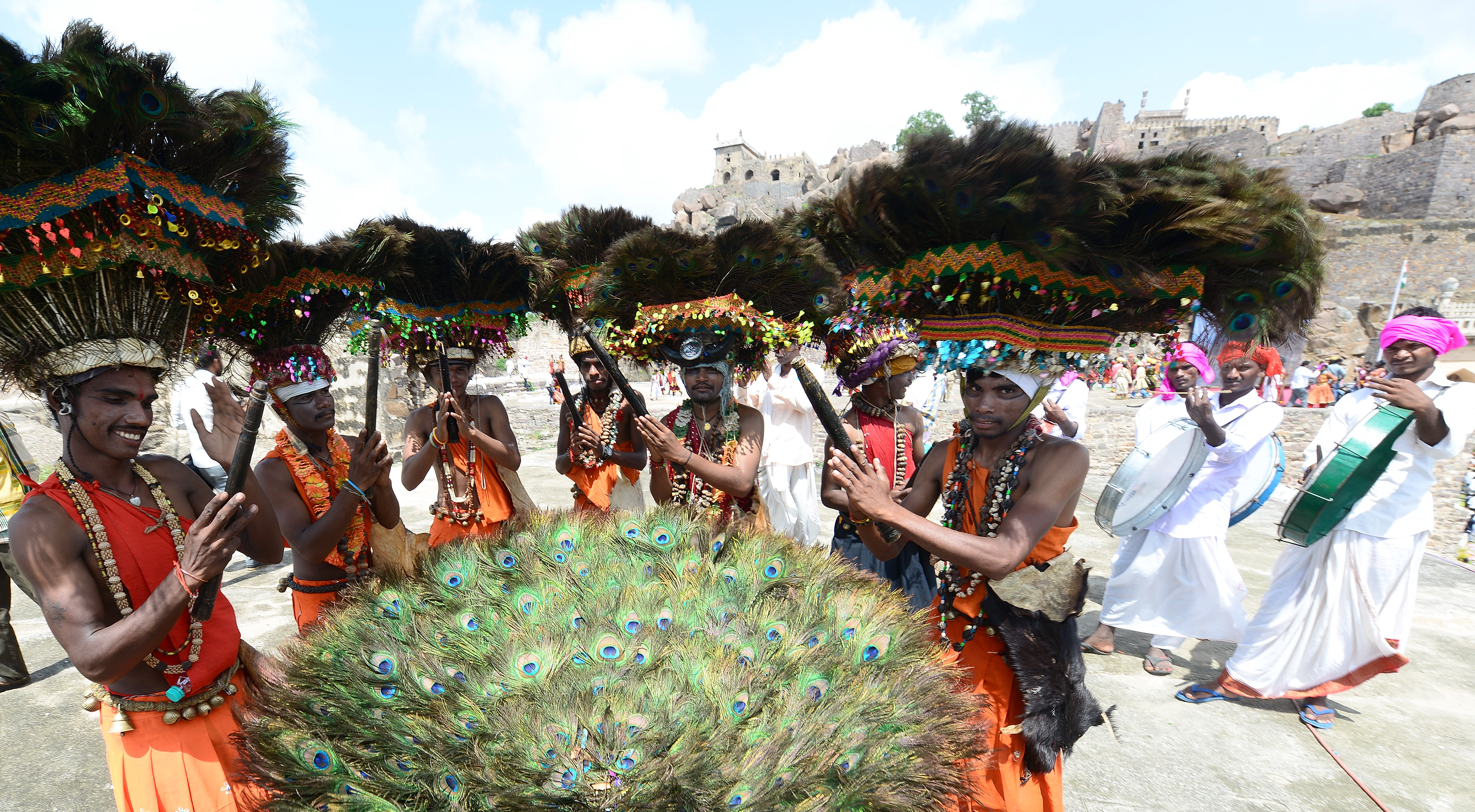
Gussadi artists performing at the Golconda Fort in Hyderabad during Independence Day celebrations.

The Gussadi dance is deemed a symbol of respect and culture for the Gond people. During the multi-day dance festival, the dancers follow a strict set of rules and live a simple life. They perform other traditional dances, such as the Chachoyi and the Rela dance, the latter of which usually performed exclusively by women.

== Appearance and costumes ==
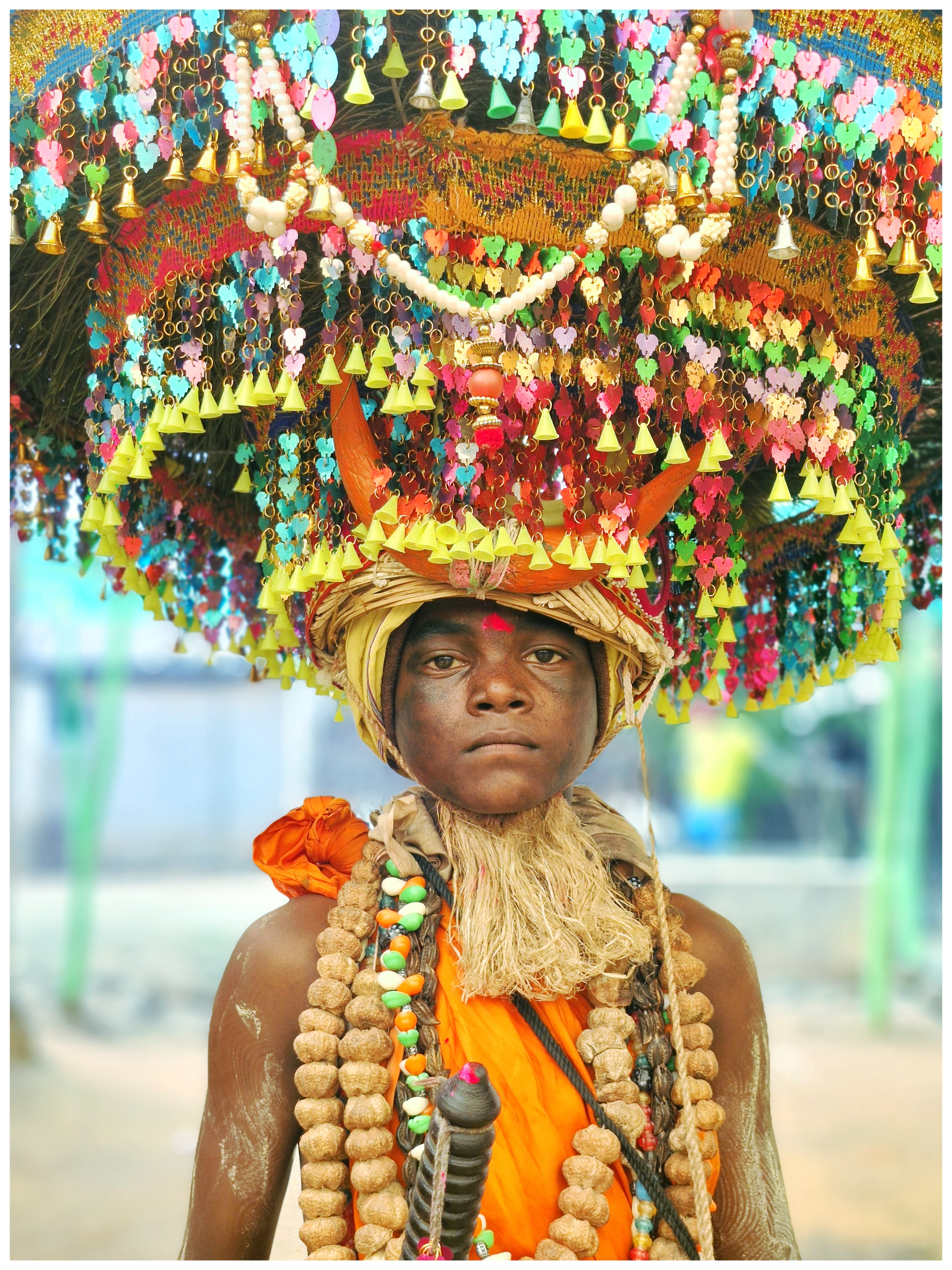
A Gussadi dancer in full traditional costume.

The Gussadi dancers are dressed with special clothes and accessories to stand out distinctively in the crowd. Dancers wear a very large hat called Malpuve that is made of peacock feathers, often include more than a thousand feathers. The dancers' preparations include rubbing ash on their bodies and outfitting themselves with fake beards and mustaches made of hair or wool. They dress their waists with a piece of goat or deer skin, and are equipped with a special wooden stick (Gangaram Sota).

International Mothers language day FEB 21 2025, Gondi Dance (gussadi) venue : IIIT Hyderabad

Accompanying the Gussadi dancers in the dance troupe are a group of men called Diyurs. They wear a simple white cloth called a dhoti and a headscarf. The women who perform the separate Rela dance are called Diyang.

== Dance steps ==
The Gussadi dance follows a defined set of rules and steps. There are seven main types of dance moves, known as the Edum Chaal (Seven Moves).

=== The Seven Moves ===
- Sur Chaal: This is the starting move. The word sur means "start." Several musicians play drums in a slow rhythm, while the Gussadi dancers stand in lines, moving their sticks forward and sideways while jumping slowly. This movement is a symbolic way of conveying introductory greetings, or a namaste, to the crowd.
- Gussadi Chaal: In this stage, the dancers bend down slightly. They move their right leg and their stick at the same time to the beat of the drums.
- Mahadevana Chaal: This is considered a spiritual movement, and is named after a god. In this stage, the rhythm of the drumming is sped up.
- Urum Chaal: In this step, the dancers mimic the movements of a monitor lizard, dancing closer to the ground.
- Hedge Chaal: The dancers mimic the movements of a bear, jumping and move forward with increasing intensity to match the drum sounds.
- Animal Moves: The sixth move often imitates the movement of other forest animals.
- Sakshi Chaal: The concluding move is the fastest part of the dance. Dancers hold their sticks with both hands, spinning very fast in the shape of the letter 'S'. In the final step, a loud dham is sounded from the drum, and all the dancers simultaneously jump high and then stop their dancing.

== Traveling Between Villages ==
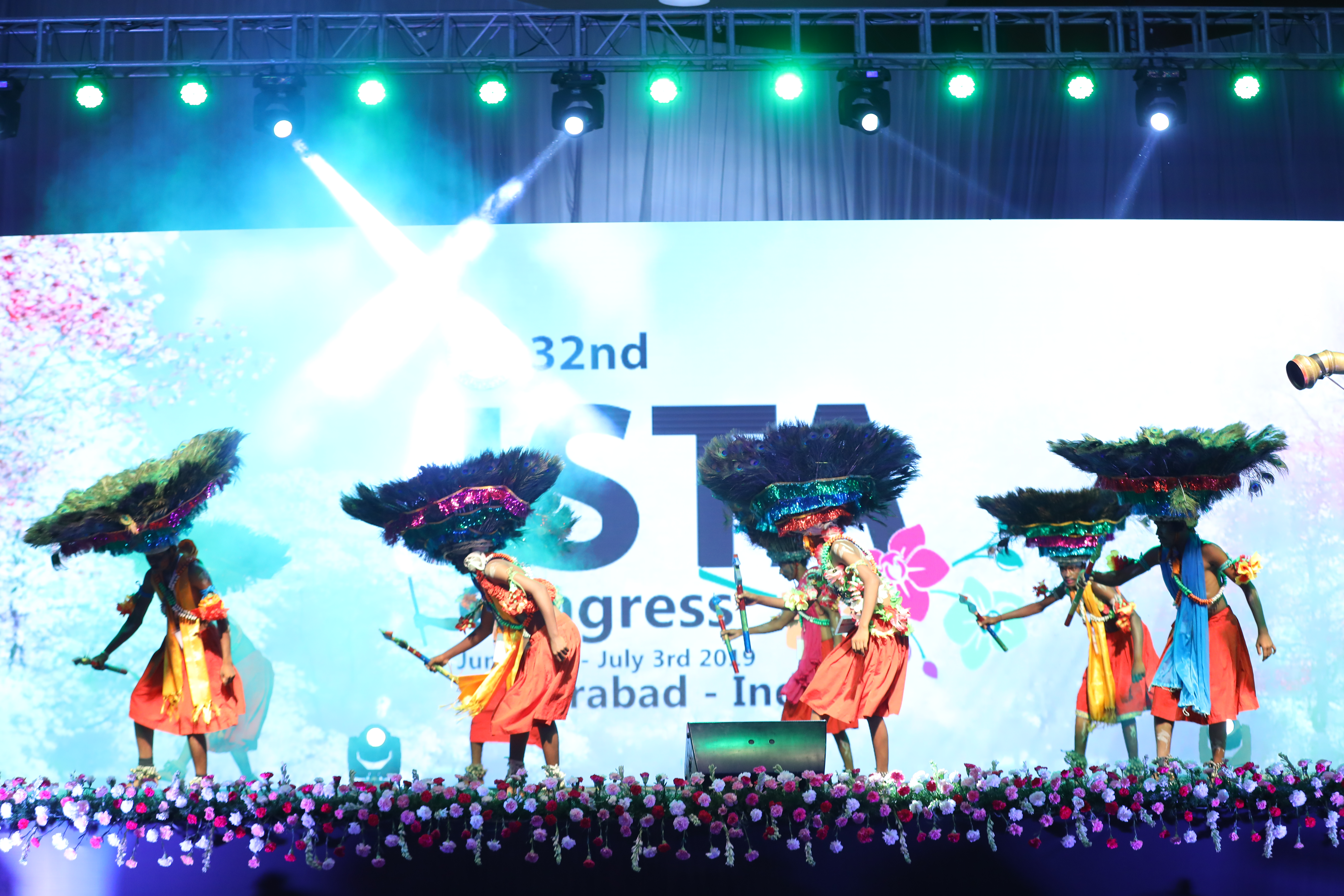
Gussadi performance at an international meeting in Hyderabad.

An important part of the Dandari festival is traveling between localities. It is common that Dandari troupes hailing from one village will perform in at least one other village.

Upon approaching a different village, the troupe members play a large drum called a Thudum, signalling to village residents that outsiders have arrived. The people of the village typically welcome them with performances using their own drums and convey a joyful atmosphere. The host village washes the feet of the Gussadi dancers, as a sign of respect, and following they eat together and dance together. On the final day, the festival ends with a ceremony called Kolabodi.

Tribal elders explain that the movement of the Dandari troupes to different village is partially intended as a mechanism for encouraging romantic courtship and matchmaking. Unmarried male dancers are supposed to showcase their dancing skills to attract the attention of single women in the villages receiving them. Women interested in meeting a partner from the dancers, known as Porikal, are invited to attend the performances. A woman interested in a husband from the group confirms her interest, following which her mother makes the connection with the prospective groom following the festival's conclusion.

== Musical Instruments ==
The Gond tribes incorporate specific musical instruments for the Gussadi dance, which are essential for it to be performed.

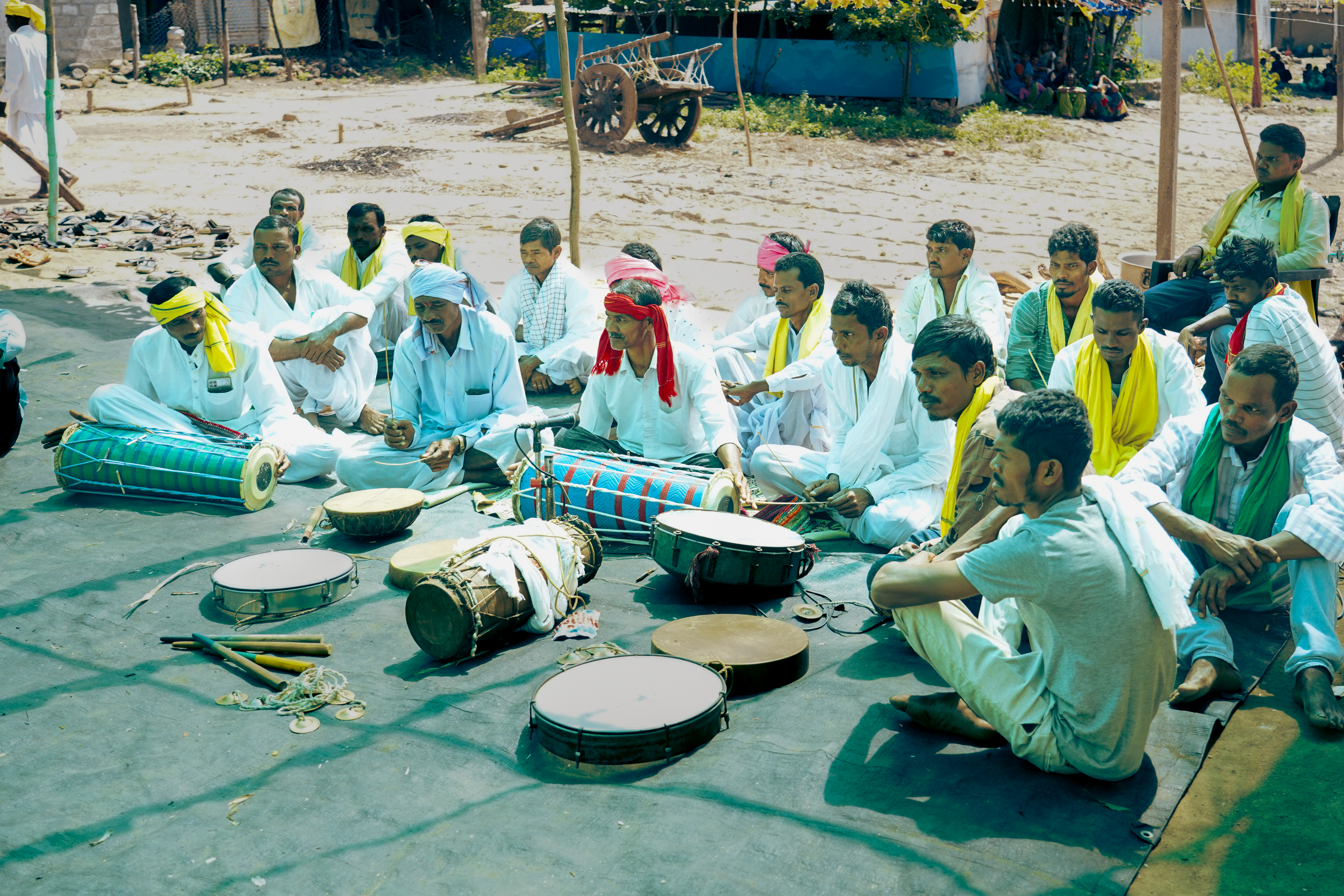
Tribal men playing musical instruments during the Gussadi-Dandari festival.

Main Instruments Used in Gussadi
Instrument	Description
Ghumela	A drum made of clay and animal skin.
Thudum	A large drum used to make loud announcements.
Dappu	A small, round hand drum.
Pepre	A wind instrument that sounds like a flute or trumpet.
Kalikom	A long, curved horn made of brass or wood.
Parra	A rhythm instrument used to keep the beat.

== Kanaka Raju: "The Gussadi king" ==
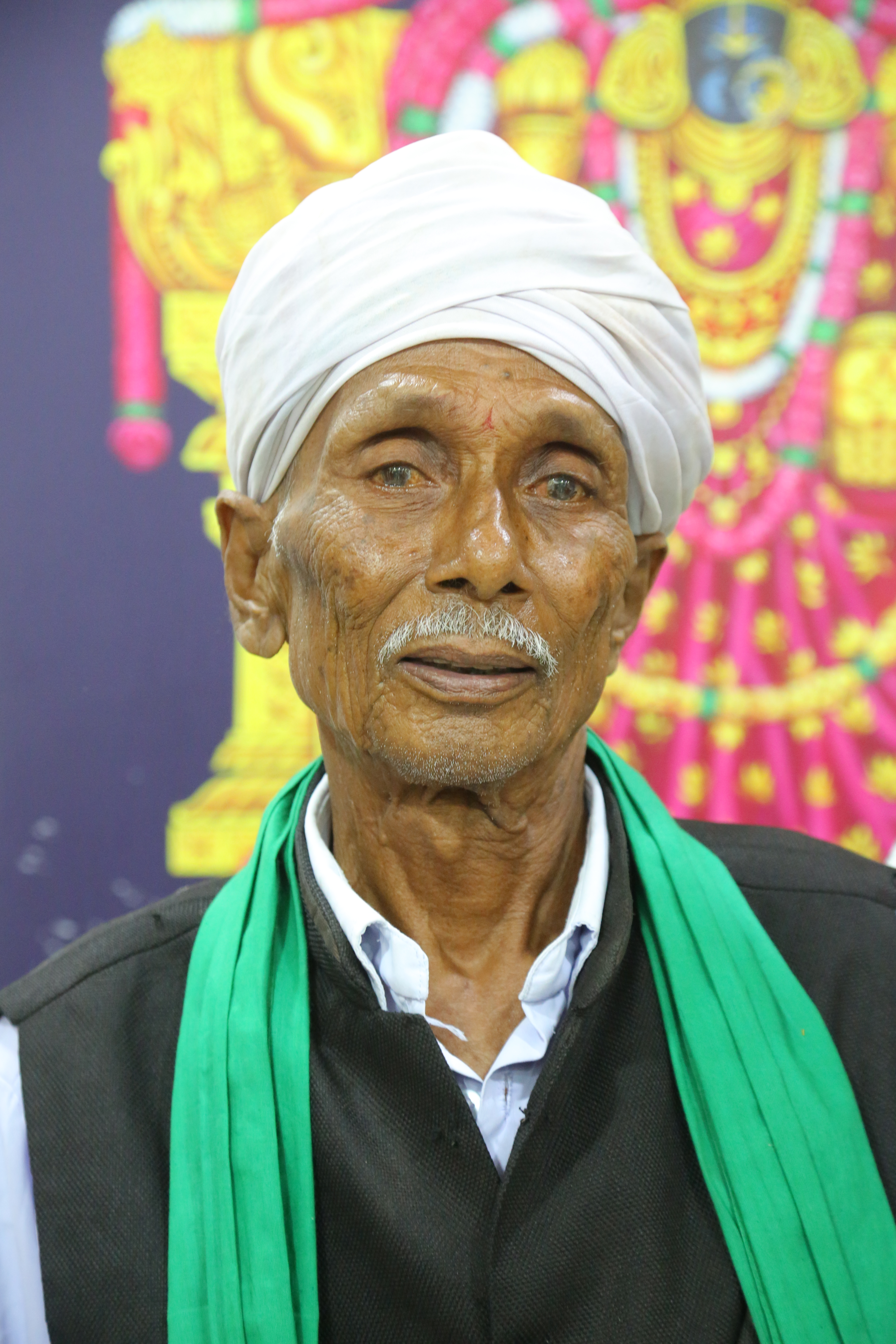
Padma Shri Gussadi Kanaka Raju.

The most famous Gussadi dancer is widely on considered to be Kanaka Raju. Hailing from the village of Marlavai in the Komuram Bheem Asifabad district of Telangana, Raju spent over 55 years teaching and performing this dance. Raju received national attention in 1982, when he performed the Gussadi dance at the Red Fort in Delhi for the Republic Day parade, in the presence of Prime Minister Indira Gandhi and President A. P. J. Abdul Kalam.

In 2021, the government of India awarded him with the Padma Shri accolade, one of the country's highest honours, for his efforts to preserve tribal culture. Kanaka Raju passed away on 25 October 2024. He is popularly known in India as the "Gussadi King".

== Contemporary era ==
The Gussadi dance has become well known across India, beyond its origin region in Telangana State. The state government is involved in promoting it, including during local festivals like Bonalu and Ugadi. It is often shown at the Republic Day parade in Hyderabad. The dance and its accompanying festival is seen are seen as vehicle for teaching young Gond people about their history and keeps their tribal culture strong in the modern era replete with globalisation and foreign influences.

== See also ==
Gond people

Folk dance of India

Culture of Telangana

Lambadi
