= Duruwa language =

Dravidian language spoken in India

Dhurwa and Durua
- ଦୁରୁଆ, धुरुवा Durua
- Native to: India
- Ethnicity: Duruwa (Durua)
- Native speakers: 52,349 (2011 census)
- Language family: Dravidian: Central Dravidian; Parji–Gadaba; Dhurwa and Durua
- Writing system: Odia script, Devanagari script

Language codes
- ISO 639-3: pci
- Glottolog: durua1236
- ELP: Duruwa

Duruwa (IPA: [d̪ʱuruʋaː], Odia: ଦୁରୁଆ, Devanagari: धुरुवा) or Dhuruwa or Durua is a Central Dravidian language spoken by the Duruwa people of India, in the districts of Koraput in Odisha and Bastar in Chhattisgarh. The language is related to Ollari and Kolami, which is also spoken by other neighbouring tribes.

== Classification ==
Duruwa is a member of the Central Dravidian languages. Duruwa is a spoken language and is generally not written. Whenever it is written, it makes use of the Devanagari script in Bastar district and Odia script in Koraput district.

== Phonology ==
Vowels
	Front		Central		Back	
	short	long	short	long	short	long
High	i	iː			u	uː
Mid	e	eː			o	oː
Low			a	aː		

Consonants
		Labial	Dental	Retroflex	Palatal	Velar	Glottal
Nasal		m	n̪		ɲ	ŋ	
Plosive	voiceless	p	t	ʈ	c	k	
Plosive	voiced	b	d	ɖ	ɟ	ɡ	
Fricative			(s)				(h)
Approximant	median	ʋ			j		
Approximant	lateral		l				
Tap			ɾ	ɽ			

== Dialects ==
There are four dialects: Tiriya, Nethanar, Dharba, and Kukanar. They are mutually intelligible.
