= Sua (folk music) =

Indian folk song

Sua is a folk song sung by Gond women from the state of Chhattisgarh during the festival of Deepawali. The name 'Sua' comes from the word for 'parrot', a bird known for repeating phrases. According to folklore, women sing songs conveying messages through parrots, expressing their hearts' feelings with the belief that the parrot will convey the agony of their heart to their lover. It is sometimes called the 'Viyog', or 'separation' song. This folk song is usually sung during the paddy harvest. After Deepawali, Gondi women continue singing the song for two months.

The song is intended to celebrate the marriage between two gods, Shiva and Parvati alongside traditional dances. In some places, this song is sung by making earthen Sua (parrot). It starts a few days before Diwali and ends with the marriage of Shiva-Parvati (Gaura-Gauri) on Diwali. This is considered to be the adherent song. During the song, women place a parrot statue over a paddy filled with bamboo baskets and dance around them in a circular pattern, addressing the statue with their song. Sua dance is usually initiated in the evening. Women gather at a certain place in the village where this basket is covered with red cloth. After lifting the basket in the head, one of the women of the party walks and puts it in the middle of the courtyard of the farmers' house. The women of the party are round about him. The cloth is removed from the basket and the lamp is lit and danced. In Chhattisgarh, no musical instrument is used in this song dance. The song is sung by women in applause. In some villages, women keep a wooden block in their hands to intensify the tone.
