= Motiravan Kangali =

Indian linguist and author (1949–2015)

Acharya Motiravan Kangali
- मोतीरावण कंगाली
- Born: 2 February 1949; Dulara, Province of Bombay, Dominion of India (now Maharashtra, India)
- Died: 30 October 2015 (aged 66); Nagpur, Maharashtra, India
- Education: Nagpur University (M.A.), Aligarh Muslim University, (PhD)
- Occupation: Author
- Spouse: Chandralekha Kangali

Motiravan Kangali (2 February 1949 – 30 October 2015) was an Indian linguist and author from the Gond community. He is known for his work on the origins and development of the Gondi language, and particularly for his creation of a script for it. Kangali authored Gondi dictionaries in English, Hindi and Marathi. He also aided efforts for the standardization and preservation of Gondi grammar while authoring several books on Gond society, culture and religion.

Motiravan Kangali claimed that the scripts of Harappa and Mohenjo-daro could be read in Gondi language. He also proposed that the Gond people must have been in the Indus Valley.

== Early life ==
Motiravan Kangali was born on 2 February 1949 in a village called Dulara of Ramtek Tehsil in Nagpur district of Maharashtra. His place of birth is located in the forests of Bhander near Devlapar, about 75 km from Nagpur on Nagpur Seoni State Road and he was born in the family of Tirkaji Kangali (grandfather) of a Gond community. His mother's name was Dai Raithaar Kangali and father's name was Dau Chathiram Kangali. Named Motiram at birth, he was the eldest of five siblings, with two brothers and two sisters. As an adult, he changed his first name from Motiram to Motiravan to highlight the Gond tradition which reveres Ravana.

Kangali's early education took place at Karwahi where he studied up to fourth grade. He did his secondary education (5th to 8th) in the Anglo East Secondary School, Bothia Palora, about 18 km from Dulara. He joined HUDS High School in Nagpur and passed the class X examinations in 1968. In 1972, he graduated from Dharampeth College, Nagpur. He subsequently obtained a Masters (M.A) in Economics, Sociology and Linguistics from the Post Graduate Teaching Department Nagpur. He received his PhD in 2000 from Aligarh Muslim University. The subject of his dissertation was "The Philosophical Base of Tribal Cultural Values Particularly in Respect of Gond Tribes of Central India".

In 1976, at the age of 27, Kangali was appointed a Notes and Currency Examiner at the Reserve Bank of India's Nagpur Mint. He married Raitad (Kumari) Chandralekha Roop Singh Pusam. You have three daughters named series Kangali, Verunjali Kangali, Vinanti Kangali. The series is an IRS officer and Vinanti is an eye specialist doctor. Both of them have been married. Manjali's daughter Verunjali has also done her M.Phil in Marathi literature and is currently living in Nagpur and working in mother's work.

As a researcher, he worked to revive the Gondi language while studying linguistics and helped make books available to the general public to learn and teach Gondi language.

== Revival of the Gond tribal fair ==
Kangali, along with friends K B Maraskole and Sheetal Markam, visited Kachhargarh in Bhandara district, Maharashtra, having read about the traditional Gond fair or Jatra held there on the occasion of Maagh Purnima. In Gond tradition, the day marks the rescue of the mother goddess, Mata Kali Kankali's children from a cave by the Gond ancestor, Pari Kupar Lingo and his sister Jango Raitad. They discovered that the fair had shrunk in attendance from the past, down to around 500 visitors. They began the work of reviving the significance of the fair among the Gonds until the fair scaled back up to attendance in 1986 by as many as 3–400,000 tribals from Central India, Maharashtra, Odisha and Andhra Pradesh. Recognized for his efforts, Kangali was appointed head of the apex religious body of the Gonds, the Gondi Punem.

Keshav Banaji Maraskole, who hails from Maharu Tola, had first told Kangali about the location of the supposed cave from which the rescue occurred. Traditionally, local Gond residents would worship at that cave in a ceremony called Gongo. Kangali researched the antecedents of the worship and the cave itself, and discovered references to it in the writings of Robert Vane Russell and C U Wills.

Kangali, Maraskole and Sunher Singh Taram (editor of the Bhopal periodical Gondwana Darshan) attended the fair in 1980. In 1984, two more notable Gond leaders, Bharat Lal Koram and Sheetal Markam (by then, the head of the Gondwana Mukti Sena organisation) joined them and the five made the first trek from the fair to the location of the cave. Over the next few years, Kacchargarh emerged as the primary religious centre of Koitur Gonds and in 1986, Hira Singh Markam also joined the pilgrimage.

Koiturs from many states began joining the jatra. Over 40 years, visitors to the jatra now number in the millions.

== Writing career ==
Motiravan Kangali contributed to the freedom of the religious places of Gond Koitur from the occupation of Hindus. The Hindus established their deities in exchange for the Gond ancestors. Dr. Kangali also worked on this subject and by writing many books in the common public, informing of these Goddess places to everyone. Some of them wrote small books about important goddess places such as Bamleshwari Dai of Dongargarh, Danteshwari Dai of Bastar, Tilaka Dai of Korodigarh and Kankali Dai of Chandagarh.

To establish and promote Gondi philosophy and religion (Koya Punem), he envisaged the Bhumka (Purohit) federation and began its propaganda, which was later handed over to Tirumal Ravan Shah Invati and got himself busy writing. Today the Bhumka Mahasangh is active in establishing and promoting Koya Punem by training its roles in other states including Maharashtra, Chhattisgarh, Uttar Pradesh and Madhya Pradesh.

Kangali's book Gondi Punamdarshan was a chronicle of the cultural history of Gondwana (the land of the Gonds). His wife Chandralekha Kangalis, a sociologist and scholar in her own right, collaborated with him on this and other works of his. He did many things in the field of Gondi language and also gave his full support and cooperation in getting Gondi recognized at the national level. But look at the misfortune that such an ancient language, which is in crores of speakers, which has its own beautiful grammar and script, is being ignored by the Government of India and even after so many struggles and movements, Gondi languages is not found in the eighth schedule of India Is getting.

Kangali's Pari Kupar Lingo Gondi Darshan was an outcome of his research on Gond Punem, a philosophical framework created by Pari Kupar Lingo. The book also provides a narrative of the conflict between indigenous residents and the Aryans.

Kangali had also researched possible links between Dravidian languages and the as-yet undeciphered Indus script. When Kangali inspected 22 painted characters discovered in the mid-1990s in Hampi, he interpreted five of them as similar to Gondi characters.

Motiravan Kangali was very concerned about the Gondi language. He used to say that no language can be landed inside any culture and if a culture is to be destroyed then destroy its language. This is what is happening with the Gondi language in this country. If the Gondi language does not exist then the imagination of Gond, Gondwana will become meaningless and the ancient glorious culture and the people who celebrate it will also become extinct one day. This is a concern that governments must understand and make efforts to save and groom Gondi language culture.

== Death ==
Kangali died on 30 October 2015.

== Bibliography ==
Non-fiction

- Decipherment of the Indus script in Gondi(2002)

Novels

- Gondo Ka Mul Nivas Sthal Parichay (2011, first published as Gond Vasiyon Ka Mul Niwas Sthal 1983. Nagpur: Tirumay Chitralekha Kangali Publications)
- Gondvana Ka Sanskrutik Itihas (2018)
- Gondi Vyakaran Tatha Bhasha Rachana Gondi Kalkiyan Unde Lambej Chavali (2018)

Small Book

- Bamleshwari Dai of Dongargarh
- Danteshwari Dai of Bastar
- Tilaka Dai of Korodigarh
- Kankali Dai of Chandagarh
- Kangali, Motiravan (1986), Paari Kupaar Lingo: Gondi Punem Darshan, (Nagpur: Tirumay Chitralekha Kangali Publications).
