= Baburao Shedmake =

Indian pro-independence revolutionary

Veer Baburao Pullesur Shedmake
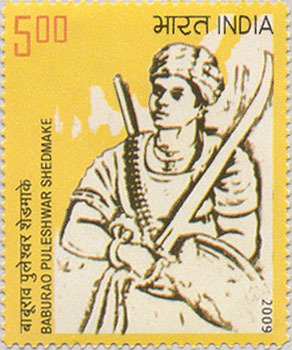
- Baburao Puleshwar Shedmake 2009 stamp
- Born: 12 March 1833; Kishtapur
- Died: 21 October 1858 (aged 25); Chanda, British India
- Occupation: King of chandagarh Rajgarh Riyasat
- Years active: 1857-58
- Known for: Revolt in Chanda district during Indian Rebellion of 1857

Baburao Pullesur Shedmake (Marathi: बाबुराव पुल्लेसुर शेडमाके; 1833–1858) was an Indian pre-independence rebel and a Gond chieftain from Central India. During the Indian Rebellion of 1857, he led the revolt in Chanda district.

Born in a Gond family, he fought multiple battles against the British in a period of seven months in 1858. He was eventually captured and hanged for rebellion against the British government.

Baburao Shedmake's life and his revolt against foreign rule are still celebrated by the Gond community. A sobriquet veer, i.e. brave, is added to his name as a mark of his bravery. His birth and death anniversaries are observed annually throughout Gondwana region.

== Life and family ==
Baburao was born in Kishtapur village of Aheri tehsil in Chanda district on 12 March 1833. He was the eldest son of Pullesur Bapu and Jurja Kunwar. Pullesar Bapu was a zamindar of Molampalli village in Aheri Pargana.

Baburao received his initial education in a ghotul and was later sent to Raipur for English education. He returned to Molampalli after completing his education and was married to Raj Kunwar at the age of eighteen.

== Revolt ==
The British took over administration of Chanda from Bhonsales of Nagpur in 1854. They brought several changes in administration, revenue, and religious policy, which the locals took with great resentment.

The Indian Rebellion of 1857 had started in May 1857 in north India. Bapurao used this opportunity to organize a troop of about 500 tribal men in September 1857 and establish his army Jangom Dal. In March 1858, he captured the Rajgarh pargana, which was under British administration. Shortly other zamindars from the region, prominently Vyankat Rao, zamindar of Adpalli and Ghot, joined him in the rebellion.

Upon hearing of these revolts, Captain W. H. Crichton, Deputy Commissioner of Chanda, led a force of 1700 to suppress it. The British first met Shedmake's troops on 13 March 1858 near village Nandgaon Ghosari. The Gonds won this battle and inflicted serious losses of life and equipment on the British. The two forces clashed again on 19 April 1858 at Sagnapur and on 27 April 1858 at Bamanpeth. Shedmake's troops won both of these battles. On 29 April 1858, they raided a telegram camp at Chinchgondi on Pranhita River. The British forces pursued them but suffered their third consecutive defeat at Ghot village on 10 May 1858. (Note: See Geographicus for copy of original map of Chanda region with handwritten annotations by Captain W. H. Crichton during the mutiny.) Two British telegram employees were killed in this raid, among other casualties.

Baburao's army was skillful in guerrilla techniques. They made good use of bows and even pushed stones from hilltops towards the British troops at some instances. Further, hilly region and jungles made British advances difficult, and they had to retreat. As the battles did not help much, Captain Crichton set a reward of Rs. 1000 for apprehending Baburao Shedmake and also pressured some larger Gond zamindars to support the British to suppress the revolt. This proved helpful, and one Laxmibai, a woman zamindar of Aheri, turned traitor and took it upon herself to present Baburao to Crichton. He was ultimately caught by Laxmibai's soldiers on 18 September 1858 and handed over to Captain Crichton.

Bapurao was brought to Chanda and a case was filed against him. The British found him guilty of rebellion against the British government. He was hanged at Chanda jail on 21 October 1858.

== Legacy ==
Stories of Baburao Shedmake's gallantry spread among Gond villages even during his lifetime. Though he was hanged in 1858, the revolt was continued and taken further by his alliances. The revolt was also joined by the Muslim Rohillas and spread up to Sirpur, Adilabad, and even Hyderabad Residency was attacked. These battles and skirmishes kept going on till 1860.

Baburao Shedmake left a long-lasting legacy and is celebrated as a hero all throughout Gondwana region. He is known by a sobriquet veer, i.e. brave. The peepal tree in front of Chandrapur Jail on which he was hanged has been turned into a memorial where thousands gather annually on his birth and death anniversaries. Several schools, colleges, parks, etc. in the region are named after him. (Note: To name a few, Shahid Baburao Shedmake High School, Gadchiroli; Veer Baburao Shedmake Memorial at Ghot; Veer Bapurao Pullesur Shedmake flyover at Warora.) India Post released a postal stamp in his memory on 12 March 2009, his birth anniversary.
