= Gunda Dhur =

Indian tribal leader

Gunda Dhur was a tribal leader from village Nethanar in Jagdalpur tehsil, of Bastar district, in present-day Chhattisgarh. He played a major role in 1910 rebellion of the Dhurwas of Kanger forest in Bastar, and led the rebellion. He is considered as a hero by many tribals of Bastar.He was one of the prominent leaders who lead the Bastar rebellion, however gunda dhur was never captured by Britisher's, gunda dhur can also be seen as a prominent leader in 1910 rebellion, the 1910 rebellion occur in india on the issue of reservation by the Britisher's, reservation was a big problem for the tribal people, taking their land and displacing them out of their mother village, and the wrath among the people's of the village led to the rebellion of 1910.

== Memorial ==
On 10 February 2020, a statue made by the tribal community was unveiled at Kanker, Chhattisgarh by the Chief Minister of Chhattisgarh Bhupesh Baghel. The very first painting of Gunda dhur was made by renowned Bastar artist, Mr. Banshilal Vishwakarma which he forged by asking multiple tribes and villagers. This painting is widely used as a reference for his appearance.
