= Kanaka Raju =

Indian Gussadi dancer (1940/1941–2024)

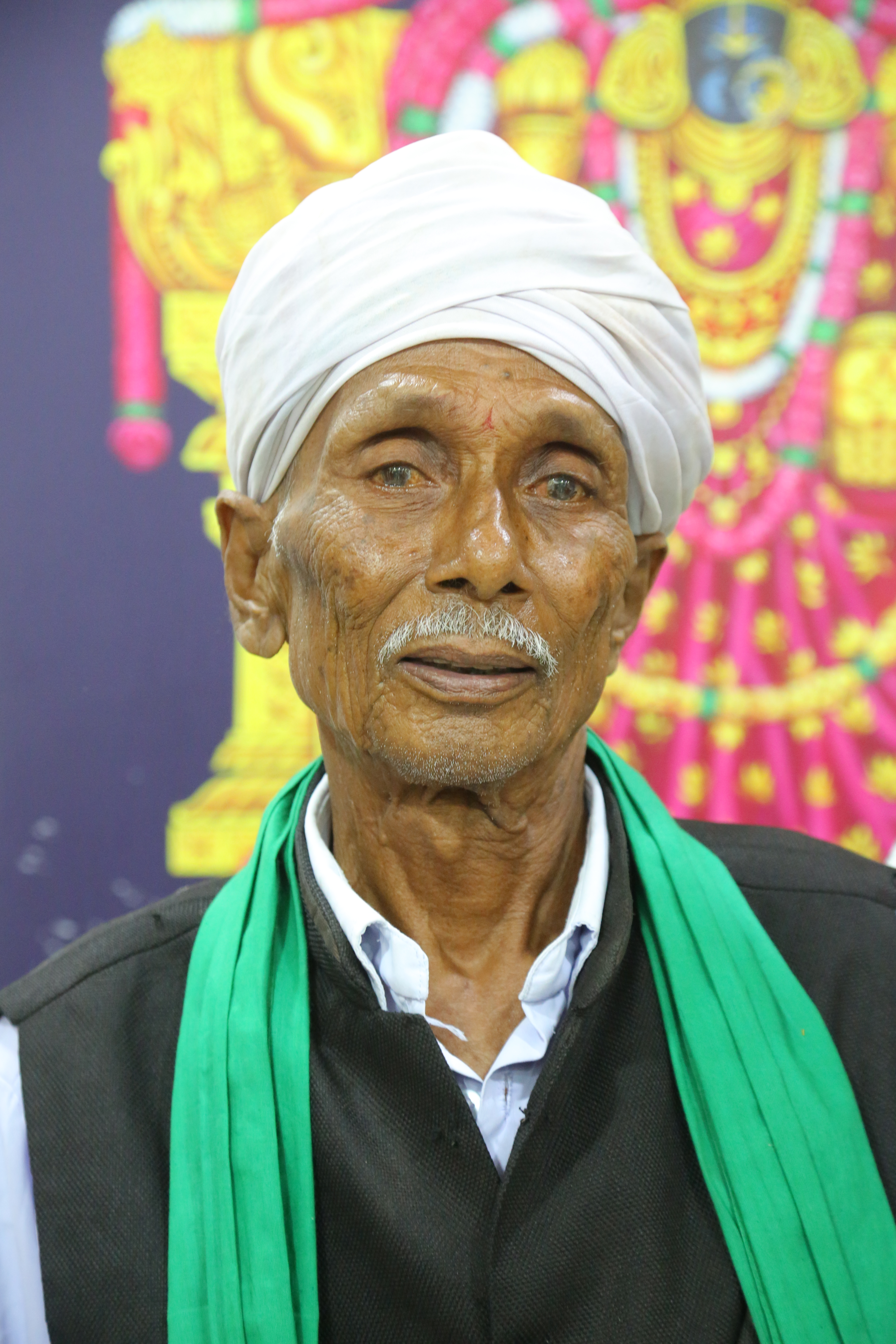
- Raju in 2021
- Born: 1940/1941; Marlavai, Hyderabad State, India
- Died: 25 October 2024 (aged 83); Marlavai, Komaram Bheem Asifabad district, Telangana, India
- Occupation: Gussadi dancer
- Awards: Padma Shri, 2021

Kanaka Raju (1940/1941 – 25 October 2024) was an Indian Gussadi dancer. In 2021, he received the Padma Shri award from the Indian government for his contribution to the arts.

== Background ==
Raju was from Marlavai village, Jainoor, in Komaram Bheem Asifabad district. He died on 25 October 2024, at the age of 83.

== Career ==
Raju has been teaching Gussadi dance for more than forty years. In 1981, he performed in the Republic Day parade. He was chief dance master of Kanaka Raju School of Gusadi dance.

== Death ==
Raju died due to age-related issues on 25 October 2024, at the age of 84. He is survived by his wife, eight daughters, and four sons.

== Awards ==
- Padma Shri in 2021
