= Ramji Gond =

Indian Gond chief (died 1860)

- Born: Asifabad, Telangana State, India
- Died: 9 April 1860

Ramji Gond (died 9 April 1860) was an Indian Gond chief who ruled the tribal areas in present-day Adilabad district of Telangana. The areas under his rule included Nirmal, Utnoor, Chennuru, and Asifabad. He fought against the British Raj, for which he was caught and hanged.
