= Dindori =

Dindori may refer to the following places in India:

- Dindori, Madhya Pradesh
  - Dindori district
  - Dindori, Madhya Pradesh Assembly constituency
- Dindori, Maharashtra
  - Dindori Lok Sabha constituency
  - Dindori, Maharashtra Assembly constituency
