= Shahpura, Madhya Pradesh Assembly constituency =

Constituency of the Madhya Pradesh legislative assembly in India

Coordinates: 22.89°N 75.66°E

Shahpura
- Constituency No. 103 for the Madhya Pradesh Legislative Assembly

Constituency details
- Country: India
- Region: Central India
- State: Madhya Pradesh
- District: Dindori
- Lok Sabha constituency: Mandla
- Reservation: ST

Member of Legislative Assembly
- 16th Madhya Pradesh Legislative Assembly
- Incumbent Om Prakash Dhurve
- Party: Bharatiya Janata Party
- Elected year: 2023
- Preceded by: Bhoopendra Maravi

Shahpura is one of the 230 Vidhan Sabha (Legislative Assembly) constituencies of Madhya Pradesh state in central India. Current Member of Legislative Assembly of Shahpura is Om Prakash Dhurve from the Bharatiya Janata Party.

It is part of Dindori district.

== Members of the Legislative Assembly ==
Year	Member	Party
1977	Anoop Singh Maravi	Janata Party
1980	Sunderlal Ureti	Indian National Congress (Indira)
1985	Anoop Singh Maravi	Bharatiya Janata Party
1990	Ram Singh	Bharatiya Janata Party
1993	Ganga Bai Ureti	Indian National Congress
1998	Ganga Bai Ureti	Indian National Congress
2003	Dr. C.S. Bhavedi	Bharatiya Janata Party
2008	Ganga Bai Ureti	Indian National Congress
2013	Om Prakash Dhurve	Bharatiya Janata Party
2018	Bhoopendra Maravi	Indian National Congress
2023	Om Prakash Dhurve	Bharatiya Janata Party

== Election results ==
=== 2023 ===
2023 Madhya Pradesh Legislative Assembly election: Shahpura
Party	Candidate	Votes	%	±%
BJP	Om Prakash Dhurve	84,844	38.23	+10.1
INC	Bhoopendra Maravi	79,227	35.7	−9.89
GGP	Aman Singh Porte	40,860	18.41	+2.5
AAP	Amar Singh Marko	4,530	2.04	−1.11
Aapki Apni Party (peoples)	Sukhdev Singh Kushram	3,029	1.36	
Bharatiya Shakti Chetna Party	Ramesh Kumar Banwasi	2,844	1.28	
NOTA	None of the above	4,636	2.09	−1.27
Majority		5,617	2.53	−14.93
Turnout		221,924	83.09	+4.02
BJP gain from INC		Swing		

=== 2018 ===
2018 Madhya Pradesh Legislative Assembly election: Shahpura
Party	Candidate	Votes	%	±%
INC	Bhoopendra Maravi	88,687	45.59	
BJP	Om Prakash Dhurve	54,727	28.13	
GGP	Ranjeet Singh Maravi	30,955	15.91	
AAP	Amar Singh Marko	6,130	3.15	
Independent	Anek Singh Maravi	2,931	1.51	
BSP	Gawlu Singh Markam	2,586	1.33	
Independent	Shambhu Singh Maravi	1,988	1.02	
NOTA	None of the above	6,543	3.36	
Majority		33,960	17.46	
Turnout		194,547	79.07	
INC gain from		Swing		

== See also ==
- Shahpura, Dindori
