= Dindori, Madhya Pradesh Assembly constituency =

Constituency of the Madhya Pradesh legislative assembly in India

Coordinates: 22.94°N 81.08°E

Dindori
- Constituency No. 104 for the Madhya Pradesh Legislative Assembly

Constituency details
- Country: India
- Region: Central India
- State: Madhya Pradesh
- District: Dindori
- Lok Sabha constituency: Mandla
- Established: 1951
- Reservation: ST

Member of Legislative Assembly
- 16th Madhya Pradesh Legislative Assembly
- Incumbent Omkar Singh Markam
- Party: Indian National Congress
- Elected year: 2023
- Preceded by: Dulichand Uraiti

Dindori Assembly constituency is one of the 230 Vidhan Sabha (Legislative Assembly) constituencies of Madhya Pradesh state in central India. It is part of Dindori District, and a segment of Mandla (Lok Sabha constituency).

== Members of the Legislative Assembly ==
Election	Member	Party
1952 (Note: 2-member constituency)	Dwarikaprasad Anantram	Indian National Congress
1952	Roopsingh Umraosingh	Indian National Congress
1957	Dwarikaprasad Anantram	Indian National Congress
1962	Basorisingh	Indian National Congress
1967	S. Lal	Indian National Congress
1972	Sunderlal Ureti	Indian National Congress
1977	Moti Singh Sandhya	Independent
1980	Dharam Singh Masram	Indian National Congress (Indira)
1985	Dharam Singh Masram	Indian National Congress
1990	Jehar Singh	Bharatiya Janata Party
1993	Nanhe Singh	Indian National Congress
1998	Jehar Singh	Bharatiya Janata Party
2003	Dulichand Uraiti	Bharatiya Janata Party
2008	Omkar Singh Markam	Indian National Congress
2013	Omkar Singh Markam	Indian National Congress
2018	Omkar Singh Markam	Indian National Congress
2023	Omkar Singh Markam	Indian National Congress

== Election results ==
=== 2023 ===
2023 Madhya Pradesh Legislative Assembly election: Dindori
Party	Candidate	Votes	%	±%
INC	Omkar Singh Markam	93,946	45.11	−0.69
BJP	Pankaj Tekam	81,681	39.22	+10.68
Independent	Rudesh Paraste	18,194	8.74	
GGP	Charan Singh Dhurve	5,179	2.49	−12.74
Bharatiya Shakti Chetna Party	Chandrasingh Kushram	2,622	1.26	
NOTA	None of the above	4,186	2.01	−0.65
Majority		12,265	5.89	−11.37
Turnout		208,241	84.16	+4.22
INC hold		Swing		

=== 2018 ===
2018 Madhya Pradesh Legislative Assembly election: Dindori
Party	Candidate	Votes	%	±%
INC	Omkar Singh Markam	85,039	45.8	
BJP	Jay Singh Maravi	52,989	28.54	
GGP	Ganga Singh Patta	28,274	15.23	
Bhartiya Shakti Chetna Party	Bhudeshwar Banwasi	7,341	3.95	
SS	Sunaram Nawasiya	2,376	1.28	
AAP	Pankaj Kumar Patta	1,930	1.04	
NOTA	None of the above	4,940	2.66	
Majority		32,050	17.26	
Turnout		185,666	79.94	
INC hold		Swing		

== See also ==
- Dindori, Madhya Pradesh
