= Omkar Markam =

Indian politician

MLA Omkar Markam

Cabinet Minister: Tribal Affairs Department, Government of Madhya Pradesh
- In office 2018–2020

Member of the Madhya Pradesh Legislative Assembly
- Incumbent
- Assumed office 2008
- Constituency: Dindori

Personal details
- Born: 2 May 1976 (age 49) Village Barnai, Dindori
- Party: INC (Indian National Congress)
- Spouse: Kusum Markam
- Children: 1 son 1 daughter
- Parent: Nanku Singh Markam (father)
- Education: M. A. in Sociology
- Profession: Politician
- Source: ["Biography:Markam, Omkar" (PDF). Madhya Pradesh Legislative Assembly.]

Omkar Singh Markam (born 2 May 1976) is a politician from Madhya Pradesh and a member of the Indian National Congress. He is currently appointed the state president of Adivasi Congress and general secretary of Madhya Pradesh Congress. He is four term MLA from Dindori having won the elections in 2008, 2013, 2018 and 2023, and he was the Cabinet Minister for Tribal Affairs Department in the Government of Madhya Pradesh from 2018 to 2020. In the 2024 election for the Lok Sabha, he was announced as the candidate of Indian National Congress from Mandla (ST). He was also the candidate in the 2014 election. He has done his MA in Sociology and is a farmer by profession, with interest in cultural programmes, social reform and poverty eradication programmes.

== Political career ==
Shri Markam has been the founder president of Netaji Subhash Chandra Bose Committee since the year 1996. Along with this, he has discharged the responsibility of office-bearer of Adivasi Vikas Parishad from year 1998 to year 2002. He was the General Secretary of District Youth Congress in the year 1998, President of Block Youth Congress, Samanpur in 2001, Secretary of Madhya Pradesh Youth Congress from 2003 to the year 2008 besides being district president of Rahul Gandhi Brigade, Dindori. He has led several public movements. Shri Markam was elected as member to the 13th Vidhan Sabha in year 2008. He was elected member second time in year 2013 and third time in year 2018.
