= Lodhi (caste) =

Agricultural caste in India

Lodhis of Sagar (Saugor), Madhya Pradesh (19th century)

The Lodhi (or Lodha, Lodh) is a community of agriculturalists, found in India. They primarily live in Madhya Pradesh, to where they had emigrated from Uttar Pradesh. The Lodhi are categorised as an Other Backward Class, (Note: In the following Indian states: Andhra Pradesh, Assam, Chhattisgarh, Delhi, Gujarat, Haryana, Madhya Pradesh, Rajasthan, Uttar Pradesh, and Uttarakhand.) but claim Rajput ties and prefer to be known as "Lodhi-Rajput", although they have no account of their Rajput origin or prevailing Rajput traditions.

== Etymology ==
Robert Vane Russell, an administrator of the British Raj, described several possible etymologies for Lodhi, including derivation from lod ("clod"), or lodh, a tree whose bark the Lodhi of Northern India gather to make dye. Russell also stated that Lodha was the original term, later corrupted to Lodhi in the Central Provinces. Another theory derives the name from the district of Ludhiana, supposing it the Lodhi homeland.

== History ==
A historical mention of a Lodhi village chief (nagar chaudhari) occurs in Navalshah Chanderia's Vardhamana Purana, written in Samvat 1825. It mentions a Gajrath pratishtha function organized by Bhisham Sahu, an ancestor of the author in Samvat 1651 (1594 AD) when a temple at Bhelsi was consecrated. The temple built during the rule of the Bundela ruler Jujhar Singh, still exists.

British sources described the Lodhi as "immigrants from the United Provinces", who spread from that area, and in doing so were able to raise their social status, becoming landholders and local rulers ranking only below the Brahmin, Rajput, and Bania. Some of these large landholders gained the title of thakur, and some Lodhi families in Damoh and Sagar were labeled as rajas, diwans and lambardars by the Raja of Panna. These now-powerful Lodhi played a significant role in the 1842 Bundela rising.

=== 20th-century caste politics ===
Members of the community developed a myth of origin, claiming that they are originally from Kazakhstan and that they were the only surviving kshatriyas following Parashurama's cleansing of the earth, thus enabling them to become kings.

Following the 1911 census of India, the Lodhi began to further organise politically, and prior to the 1921 census claimed the name Lodhi-Rajput at a conference in Fatehgarh. At the 1929 conference, the Akhil Bharatiya Lodhi-Kshatriya (Rajput) Mahasabha was drafted. The first part of the century also saw the publication of various books outlining Lodhi claims to the status of Rajput and Kshatriya, including the 1912 Maha Lodhi Vivechana and 1936 Lodhi Rajput Itihas.

== Notables ==
- Avanti Bai, a Lodhi queen of Ramgarh, now in Madhya Pradesh, who opposed the British in 1857 and is now a Dalit political icon
- Kalyan Singh, Indian politician and a member of the Bharatiya Janata Party (BJP) who served twice as the Chief Minister of Uttar Pradesh and as a Member of Parliament.
- Rammurti Singh Verma, former Member of Uttar Pradesh Legislative Assembly.
- Uma Bharti, former Chief Minister of Madhya Pradesh
