= Bajag =

Village in Madhya Pradesh, India

- Village
- Location in Madhya Pradesh, India
- Coordinates: 22.67°N 81.35°E
- Country: India
- State: Madhya Pradesh
- District: Dindori

Government
  - Type: Gram Panchayat
  - Body: Janpad Panchayat

Population (2020)
  - Total: 8,255

Languages
  - Official: Hindi, Gondi, Chhattisgarhi.
- Time zone: UTC+5:30 (IST)

Bajag is a village and a Tehsil headquarter in Dindori District of Madhya Pradesh, India. The pin Code of Bajag is 481882. There is a Government College in Bajag for Education for tribes people. Also a Police Station in village.

== Demographics ==
Bajag town has population of 8,255 of which 4,124 are males while 4,131 are females as Census India 2011.

== Agriculture ==
The main occupation of the people here is agriculture. Most people grow coarse grains and wheat. This area is a tribal dominated area.

== Transportation ==
Bajag is 45 km away from Dindori. Daily bus service available here. It is connected by road to Chhattisgarh and Madhya Pradesh.
