= Dhurve =

Dhurve is a surname. Notable people with the surname include:

- Jyoti Dhurve (born 1966), Indian politician
- Om Prakash Dhurve (born 1964), Indian politician
