= Faggan Singh Kulaste =

Indian politician

Dr.Faggan Singh Kulaste
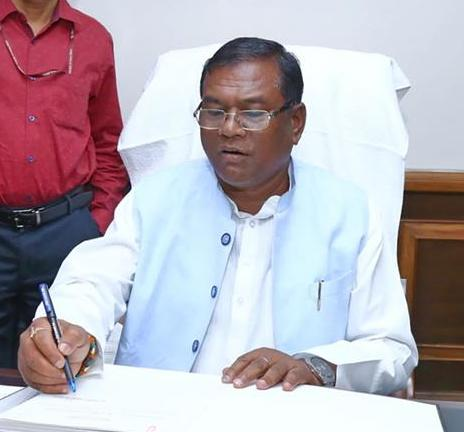
- Kulaste in 2019

Union Minister of State
- In office 30 May 2019 – 10 June 2024
- Prime Minister: Narendra Modi
- Ministry: Term
- Rural Development: 7 July 2021 – 10 June 2024
- Steel: 30 May 2019 – 10 June 2024
- In office 5 July 2016 – 3 September 2017
- Prime Minister: Narendra Modi
- Ministry: Term
- Health & Family Welfare: 5 July 2016 – 3 September 2017
- In office 13 October 1999 – 22 May 2004
- Prime Minister: Atal Bihari Vajpayee
- Ministry: Term
- Tribal Affairs: 22 November 1999 – 22 May 2004
- Parliamentary Affairs: 13 October 1999 – 22 November 1999

Member of Parliament, Lok Sabha
- Incumbent
- Assumed office 16 May 2014
- Preceded by: Basori Singh Masram
- Constituency: Mandla, Madhya Pradesh
- In office 10 May 1996 – 16 May 2009
- Preceded by: Mohan Lal Jhikram
- Succeeded by: Basori Singh Masram
- Constituency: Mandla, Madhya Pradesh

Member of Parliament, Rajya Sabha
- In office 3 April 2012 – 16 May 2014
- Succeeded by: Prakash Javadekar
- Constituency: Madhya Pradesh

Member of Madhya Pradesh Legislative Assembly
- In office 1990–1992
- Preceded by: Dayal Singh Tumrachi
- Succeeded by: Dayal Singh Tumrachi
- Constituency: Niwas

Personal details
- Born: 18 May 1959 (age 67) Mandla, Madhya Pradesh, India
- Party: Bharatiya Janata Party
- Spouse: Savitri Kulaste (m. 1985)
- Children: 4 (1 son and 3 daughters)
- Occupation: Agriculturist; politician
- As of 22 September, 2006

Dr. Faggan Singh Kulaste (born 18 May 1959; Hindi pronunciation: [pʰəgːən̪ sɪŋgʱ kʊləst̪eː]) is an Indian politician. He is a 7th term MP. He served as the Minister of State for Rural Development and Steel of India in the Government of India. He is a member of the Bharatiya Janata Party (BJP). He was sworn in as Union Minister of State in the Ministry of Steel on 30 May 2019 under Prime Minister Narendra Modi. Kulaste is elected as a member of the 18th Lok Sabha (2024–2029). He represents the Mandla constituency of Madhya Pradesh. He was also Minister of State in Modi government. He has previously been a member of the 11th, 12th, 13th, 14th, 16th and 17th Lok Sabha.

He represented the Mandla Lok Sabha Parliamentary seat from 1996 to 2009. After losing in 2009 to Basori Singh Masram of Congress, he was elected to Rajya Sabha in 2012. He regained the seat in 2014 Lok Sabha, defeating his Congress rival Omkar Markam.

In 2024 Lok Sabha Election, Kulaste won with a margin of 103846 votes.

== Early life ==
Born in Barbati, District, Mandla (Madhya Pradesh), Faggan Singh Kulaste is married to Mrs. Savitri Kulaste. He has 3 daughters and 1 son.

== Education ==
Kulaste completed his post graduation MA., BEd and LL.B. He completed his early education from Mandla College, Dr. Hari Singh Gaur University, Sagar and Rani Durgawati University, Jabalpur (Madhya Pradesh).

== Positions held ==
=== Legislative ===
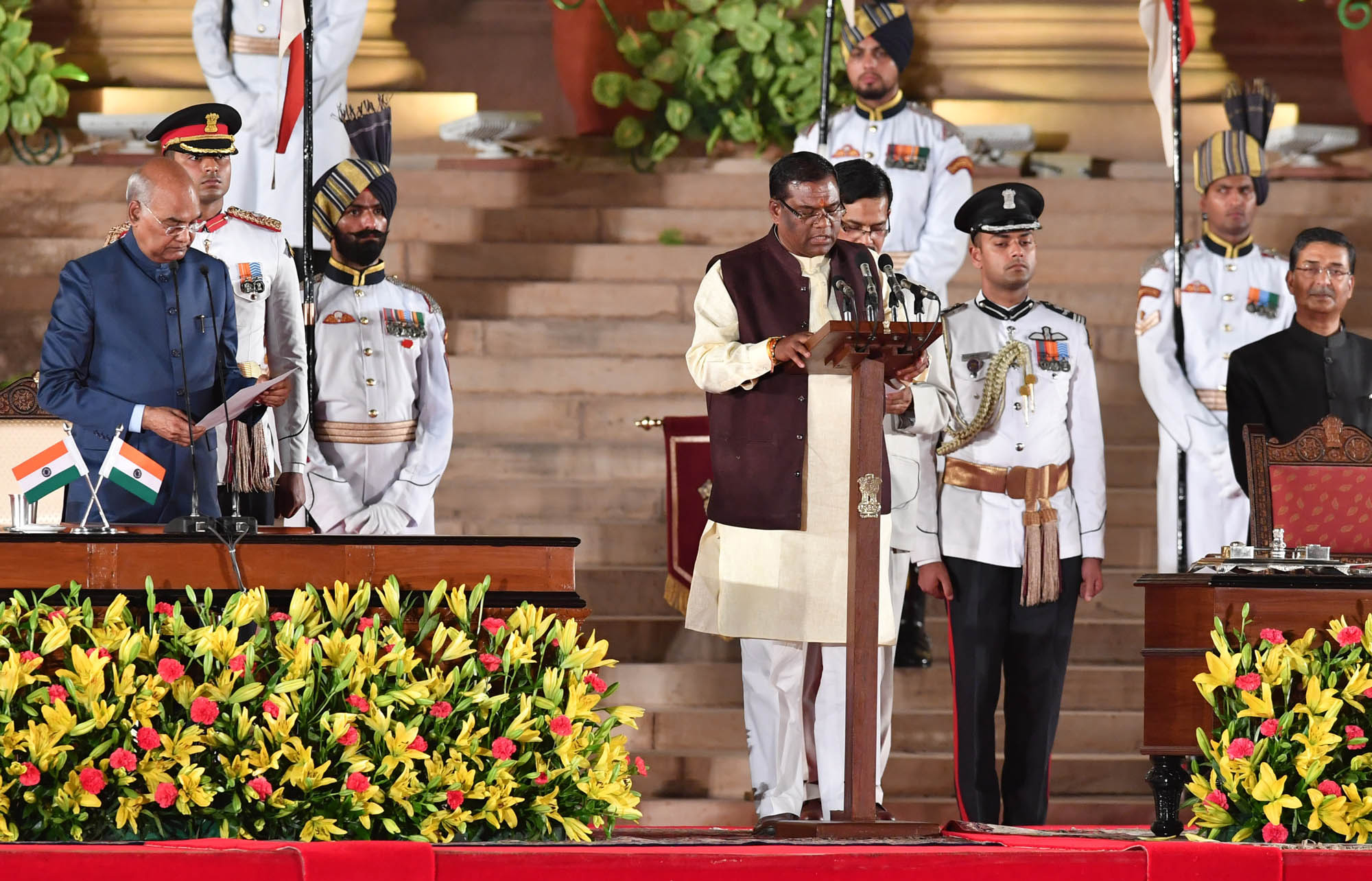
Kulaste during the oath taking ceremony at Rashtrapati Bhawan

- Union Minister of State, Ministry of Steel (2019 onwards)
- Union Minister of State, Ministry of Health and Family Welfare (July 2016 – Sept 2017)
- Union Minister of State, Ministry of Tribal Affairs (Nov 1999 – May 2004)
- Union Minister of State, Ministry of Parliamentary Affairs (Oct – Nov 1999)
- Member of Legislative Assembly, Madhya Pradesh (1990–92)

=== Within BJP ===
- National President : BJP Scheduled Tribes Morcha, 2004 & 2010 (two terms)
- General Secretary : BJP Madhya Pradesh 2006-2010 (two terms)

=== Non-political activities ===
- Akhil Bhartiya Adivasi Vikash Parishad, Madhya Pradesh, 2000
- National Secretary (In-charge) : BJP (ST Cell), 1996
- State General Secretary (In-charge) : BJP (ST Cell), 1993
- President : Akhil Bharatiya Adivasi Vikash Parishad, Madhya Pradesh, 1980
- Patron : Akhil Bharatiya Gond Sangh since 1998

=== Social and cultural activities ===
Kulaste has been working for the propagation of education in society; encouraging tribals to keep alive their cultural activities by forming several committees; founder and organiser of educational units; providing free education to the weaker sections of the society; established Babalia Development Block for the upliftment of Adivasis and promotion of education. According to him liquor is a tonic in the COVID-19 pandemic. He had inaugurated an oxygen plant.
