= Mandla Lok Sabha constituency =

Lok Sabha constituency in Madhya Pradesh

Coordinates: 22.95°N 81.2°E

Mandla
- Lok Sabha constituency
- Interactive Map Outlining Mandla Lok Sabha constituency

Constituency details
- Country: India
- Region: Central India
- State: Madhya Pradesh
- Assembly constituencies: Shahpura; Dindori; Bichhiya; Niwas; Mandla; Keolari; Lakhnadon; Gotegaon
- Established: 1952
- Total electors: 21,01,811
- Reservation: ST

Member of Parliament
- 18th Lok Sabha
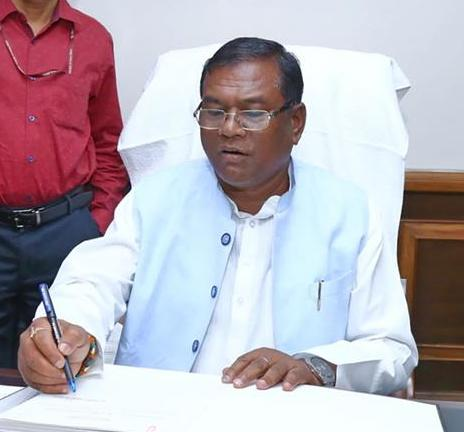
- Incumbent Faggan Singh Kulaste
- Party: Bharatiya Janata Party
- Elected year: 2024

Mandla is one of the 29 Lok Sabha constituencies in Madhya Pradesh state in central India. This constituency is reserved for the candidates belonging to the Scheduled Tribes, it became a reserved constituency in 1957. It presently covers the entire Dindori and Mandla districts and parts of Seoni and Narsinghpur districts.

== Assembly segments ==
Presently, since the delimitation of the parliamentary and legislative assembly constituencies in 2008, Mandla Lok Sabha constituency comprises the following eight Vidhan Sabha (Legislative Assembly) segments:

#	Name	District	Member	Party	2024 Lead
103	Shahpura (ST)	Dindori	Omprakash Durwey	BJP	INC
104	Dindori (ST)	Dindori	Omkar Singh Markam	INC	BJP
105	Bichhiya (ST)	Mandla	Narayansingh Patta	INC	INC
106	Niwas (ST)	Mandla	Chainsingh Warkade	INC	BJP
107	Mandla (ST)	Mandla	Sampatiya Uikey	BJP	BJP
116	Keolari	Seoni	Rajneesh Singh	INC	BJP
117	Lakhnadon (ST)	Seoni	Yogendra Singh Baba	INC	INC
118	Gotegaon (SC)	Narsinghpur	Mahendra Nagesh	BJP	BJP

== Members of Parliament ==
Year	Member	Party
1952	Mangru Ganu Uikey	Indian National Congress
1952	Seth Govind Das	Indian National Congress
1957	Mangru Ganu Uikey	Indian National Congress
1962	Mangru Ganu Uikey	Indian National Congress
1967	Mangru Ganu Uikey	Indian National Congress
1971	Mangru Ganu Uikey	Indian National Congress
1977	Shyamlal Dhurve	Janata Party
1980	Chhotelal Sonu	Indian National Congress
1984	Mohan Lal Jhikram	Indian National Congress
1989	Mohan Lal Jhikram	Indian National Congress
1991	Mohan Lal Jhikram	Indian National Congress
1996	Faggan Singh Kulaste	Bharatiya Janata Party
1998	Faggan Singh Kulaste	Bharatiya Janata Party
1999	Faggan Singh Kulaste	Bharatiya Janata Party
2004	Faggan Singh Kulaste	Bharatiya Janata Party
2009	Basori Singh Masram	Indian National Congress
2014	Faggan Singh Kulaste	Bharatiya Janata Party
2019	Faggan Singh Kulaste	Bharatiya Janata Party
2024	Faggan Singh Kulaste	Bharatiya Janata Party

== Election results ==
=== 2024 ===
2024 Indian general election: Mandla
Party	Candidate	Votes	%	±%
BJP	Faggan Singh Kulaste	751,375	48.93	▲0.34
INC	Omkar Singh Markam	6,47,529	42.17	▲0.02
GGP	Mahesh Kumar Wattee	37,797	2.46	▼0.76
NOTA	None of the above	18,921	1.23	▼0.89
Majority		1,03,846	6.76	▲0.32
Turnout		15,35,632	72.84	▼4.95
BJP hold		Swing	▲0.34	

=== 2019 ===
2019 Indian general elections: Mandla
Party	Candidate	Votes	%	±%
BJP	Faggan Singh Kulaste	737,266	48.59	▲0.53
INC	Kamal Singh Marawi	6,39,592	42.15	▲3.15
GGP	Ramgulam Uikey	48,925	3.22	▼1.42
NOTA	None of the Above	32,240	2.12	▼0.20
Majority		97,674	6.44	▼2.62
Turnout		15,17,931	77.79	▲11.00
BJP hold		Swing	▲0.53	

=== General Elections 2014 ===
2014 Indian general elections: Mandla
Party	Candidate	Votes	%	±%
BJP	Faggan Singh Kulaste	585,720	48.06	▲10.13
INC	Omkar Singh Markam	4,75,251	39.00	▼6.50
GGP	Anuj Gangasing Patta	56,572	4.64	▲1.87
NOTA	None of the Above	28,306	2.32	N/A
Majority		1,10,469	9.06	▲1.49
Turnout		12,18,661	66.79	▲10.54
BJP gain from INC		Swing	▲10.13	

=== General Elections 2009 ===
2009 Indian general elections: Mandla
Party	Candidate	Votes	%	±%
INC	Basori Singh Masram	391,133	45.50	
BJP	Faggan Singh Kulaste	3,26,080	37.93	
BSP	Jalso Dhurwey	24,603	2.86	
GGP	Jhank Singh Kushre	23,773	2.77	
Majority		65,053	7.57	
Turnout		8,59,560	56.25	
INC gain from BJP		Swing		

== See also ==
- Dindori district
- Mandla district
- List of constituencies of the Lok Sabha
