= Samnapur =

Village in Madhya Pradesh, India

- Village
- Location in Madhya Pradesh, India
- Coordinates: 22.75°N 81.10°E
- Country: India
- State: Madhya Pradesh
- District: Dindori

Government
  - Type: Gram Panchayat
  - Body: Janpad Panchayat

Population (2011)
  - Total: 4,341

Languages
  - Official: Hindi, Gondi, Chhattisgarhi.
- Time zone: UTC+5:30 (IST)

Samnapur is a village and development block in Dindori District of Madhya Pradesh, India. It is 25 km away from Dindori.

== Geography ==
Samnapur is located near Kharmer River, a tributary of Narmada River. Madhya Pradesh State Highway 43 passing from Samnapur.

== Demographics ==
In 2011, Samnapur had 4,341 people, of which 2,164 were males and 2,177 were females.
