= Jabalpur cruise tragedy =

2026 boating accident in Madhya Pradesh, India

Jabalpur cruise boat tragedy
- Date: 30 April 2026
- Location: Bargi Dam, Jabalpur, Madhya Pradesh, India
- Type: Boating accident
- Cause: Capsizing due to adverse weather (suspected)
- Participants: 31 (including crew)
- Deaths: 13

The Jabalpur cruise boat tragedy, also known as Bargi dam cruise tragedy or Narmada Queen tragedy, was a boating accident that occurred on 30 April 2026 at the Bargi Dam reservoir near Jabalpur, in the Indian state of Madhya Pradesh. The incident involved a passenger cruise vessel that capsized during adverse weather conditions, resulting in multiple fatalities.

== Background ==
Bargi Dam is located on the Narmada River and is a popular tourist destination near Jabalpur. Cruise and boating services are operated in the reservoir area by private operators as part of tourism development initiatives.

The vessel involved in the incident, identified in reports as Narmada Queen, was a passenger cruise boat operating at the Bargi Dam reservoir on the Narmada River near Jabalpur.

The boat was operated as part of tourism activities in the region and was associated with state tourism operations.

== Incident ==
On 30 April 2026, a cruise boat carrying passengers capsized in the Bargi Dam reservoir near Jabalpur following a sudden change in weather, reportedly involving strong winds and rough water.

The vessel was carrying 31 people, including passengers and crew.

Rescue operations were initiated by local authorities shortly after the incident, with teams from the police and disaster response forces deployed to the site. Several passengers were rescued from the water.

== Casualties and rescue efforts ==
The incident resulted in the deaths of at least 13 people, including several women and children, while others were rescued by emergency teams.

Search and rescue operations were carried out by local police, State Disaster Response Force (SDRF), and other authorities. Survivors were transported to nearby hospitals for treatment.

=== Victims ===
Authorities released the identities of some of the victims; however, complete and consistently verified lists were not immediately available in all reports.

Name	Age	Origin	Notes
Marina Messi	39	Delhi	Reported among the deceased
Trishaan (Jahaan) Messi	4	Delhi	Son of Marina Messi
Madhur Messi	62	Delhi	Mother of Marina Messi
Nisha Soni	—	Jabalpur	Reported among the deceased
Viraj Soni	—	Jabalpur	Child victim
Shameem Zaidi	—	Ganj Basoda	Reported among deceased
Reshma Sayyaid	—	Jabalpur	Reported among deceased
Tamilvendan Arya	5	Tamil Nadu	Visiting with family
Kamraj Arya	—	Tamil Nadu	Reported among the deceased

Note: Some names and details reported in early coverage varied across sources. The table includes only individuals whose identities were reported by multiple outlets.

=== Massey family ===
One of the families that received significant media attention was the Massey family from Delhi. Marina Massey, her four-year-old son Trishaan (also reported as Jahaan), and her mother Madhur Massey were among those who died.

The family had travelled to Jabalpur to attend a housewarming ceremony before taking the cruise ride at Bargi Dam.

Marina's husband Pradeep Kumar Verma, daughter Siya ("Pihu") Massey, and her father Julius Massey survived the incident.

=== Rescue operation ===
Initial rescue efforts were led by local fishermen, villagers, and construction workers from a nearby water project associated with the Jal Jeevan Mission, who entered the water immediately after the boat began to capsize and helped rescue several passengers.

Official rescue teams, including the National Disaster Response Force (NDRF), State Disaster Response Force (SDRF), and Army personnel, were later deployed to conduct search and recovery operations.

Divers and rescue personnel carried out operations over several days to locate missing passengers and recover bodies from the submerged vessel.

One survivor, Riyaz Hussain Sayyaid, was found alive after being trapped inside the overturned boat for several hours by holding onto an air pocket.

== See more ==
- Jabalpur
- Bargi Dam
