= Om Prakash Dhurve =

Indian politician

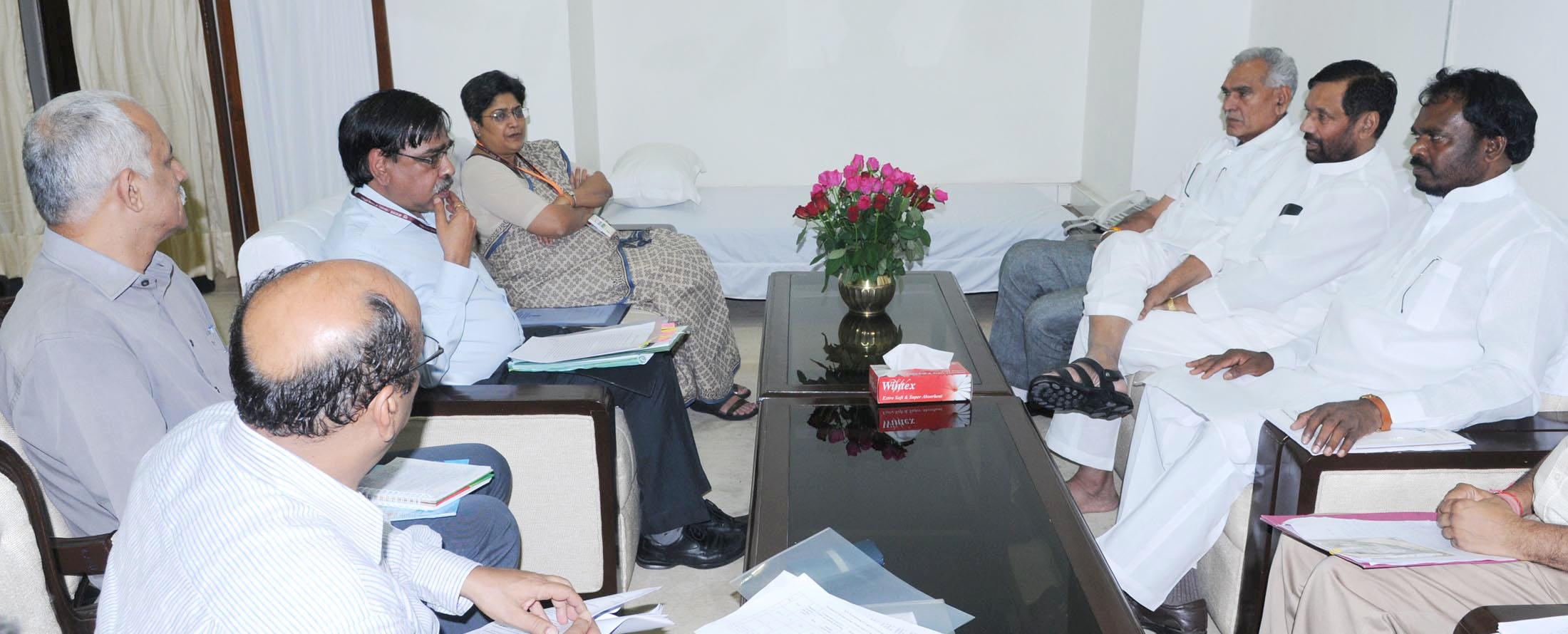
- Om Prakash Dhurve with officials of Ram Vilas Paswan.

Minister of Food, Civil Supplies & Consumer Protection, Labour, Madhya Pradesh Government
- In office June 2016 – December 2018
- Succeeded by: Pradhumn Singh Tomar

Member of Legislative Assembly, Madhya Pradesh
- In office 2013 – December 2018
- Succeeded by: Bhoopendra Maravi
- Constituency: Shahpura

Personal details
- Born: May 13, 1964 (age 61)
- Party: Bharatiya Janata Party
- Children: 2
- Profession: Politician
- As of August, 2019

Om Prakash Dhurve (born 13 May 1964) in Rusa village, Dindori district is an Indian politician from Madhya Pradesh. He is a member of Bharatiya Janata Party and a member of Madhya Pradesh Legislative Assembly at Shahpura constituency from 2013 to December 2018. He lost the 2018 election against the candidate of Indian National Congress.

== Political life ==
He served as Food, Civil Supplies and Consumer Protection, Social Welfare, SC and ST Welfare, Women and Child Development and later Tribal Welfare, Labour, Sports and Youth Welfare Minister of the state under Uma Bharti, Babulal Gaur and Shivraj Singh Chouhan. He was inducted to Cabinet Ministry of Shivraj Singh Chouhan as Minister of Food, Civil Supplies and Consumer Protection, Labour in June 2016.
