= Sursatola =

Village in Madhya Pradesh, India

- Village
- Sursatola, Madhya Pradesh
- Location in Madhya Pradesh, India
- Coordinates: 22.833208°N 81.284902°E
- Country: India
- State: Madhya Pradesh
- District: Dindori

Government
  - Sarpanch: Ms. Dharamwati Maravi

Population (2020)
  - Total: 444 More Publication

Languages
  - Official: Hindi, Gondi, Chhattisgarhi.
- Time zone: UTC+5:30 (IST)
- PIN: 481882

Sursatola is a village in Dindori district, Madhya Pradesh, India.
