= Gada Sarai =

Village in Madhya Pradesh, India

Gada Sarai (गड़ा सरई)
- city
- Location in Madhya Pradesh, India
- Coordinates: 22.49°N 81.19°E
- Country: India
- State: Madhya Pradesh
- District: Dindori

Government
  - Sarpanch: Shri Balram Maravi

Population (2001)
  - Total: 4,048

Languages
  - Official: Hindi
- Time zone: UTC+5:30 (IST)
- PIN: 481882
- Telephone code: 07645

Gada Sarai is a village in Dindori district in the state of Madhya Pradesh, India.

== Geography ==
Gadasarai is located at 22.49°N 81.19°E. It has an average elevation of 950 metres (2,099 feet).

=== Transportation ===
Gadasarai can be reached by road from Dindori and does not have any airport or railway stations nearby.

== See also ==
- Dindori, Madhya Pradesh
