= Chainsingh Warkade =

Indian politician

Member of Madhya Pradesh Legislative Assembly
- Incumbent
- Assumed office 2023
- Preceded by: Ashok Marskole
- Constituency: Niwas

Personal details
- Political party: Indian National Congress
- Profession: Politician

Chainsingh Warkade is an Indian politician from Madhya Pradesh. He is a Member of the Madhya Pradesh Legislative Assembly from 2023, representing Niwas Assembly constituency as a Member of the Indian National Congress.

== See also ==
- 2023 Madhya Pradesh Legislative Assembly election
- Madhya Pradesh Legislative Assembly
