= Avantibai =

Indian Freedom Fighter (1831 – 1858)

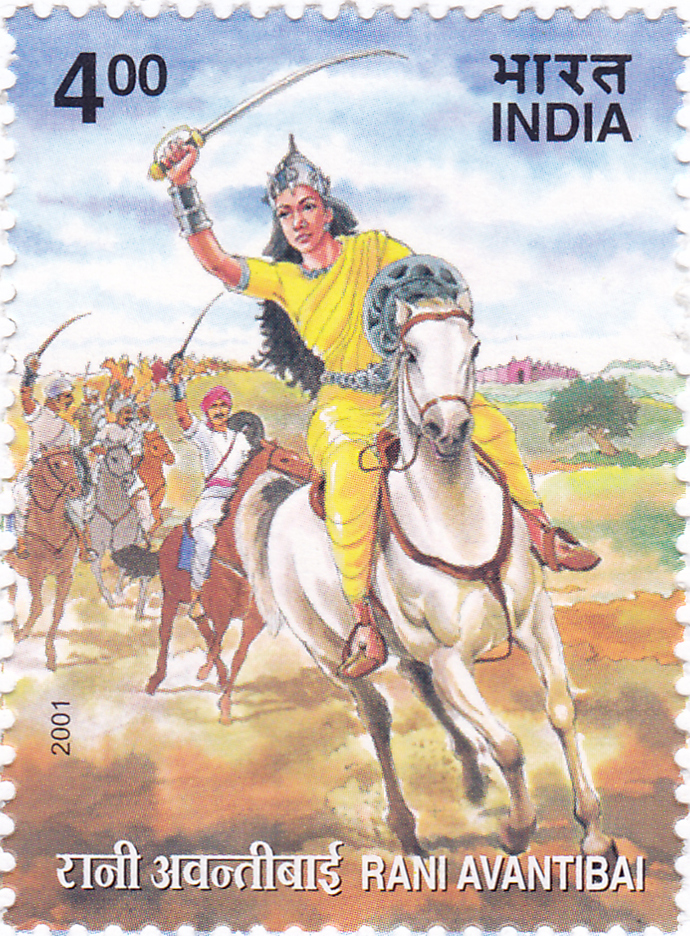
- Avantibai on a 2001 stamp of India
- Born: 16 August 1831; Mankhedi Village, Seoni
- Died: 20 March 1858 (aged 26)
- Spouse: Maharaja Vikramaditya Singh
- Father: Zamindar Rao Jujhar Singh

Maharani Avantibai Lodhi (16 August 1831 – 20 March 1858) was an Indian queen-regent and freedom fighter in the Indian Rebellion of 1857. She was the queen of Ramgarh (present-day Dindori) in Madhya Pradesh. She is considered one of the heroic Indian women warriors in the 1857 rebellion, similar to the widely known Rani Lakshmibai of Jhansi. Avantibai served as regent during her husband's illness between 1850 and 1859.

An opponent of the British East India Company during the 1857 rebellion, her information is sparse and mostly comes from folklore. In the 21st century, she has been used as a political icon in the Lodhi community, which is categorized as a Hindu Other Backward Class (OBC), but also known as the "Lodhi" community.

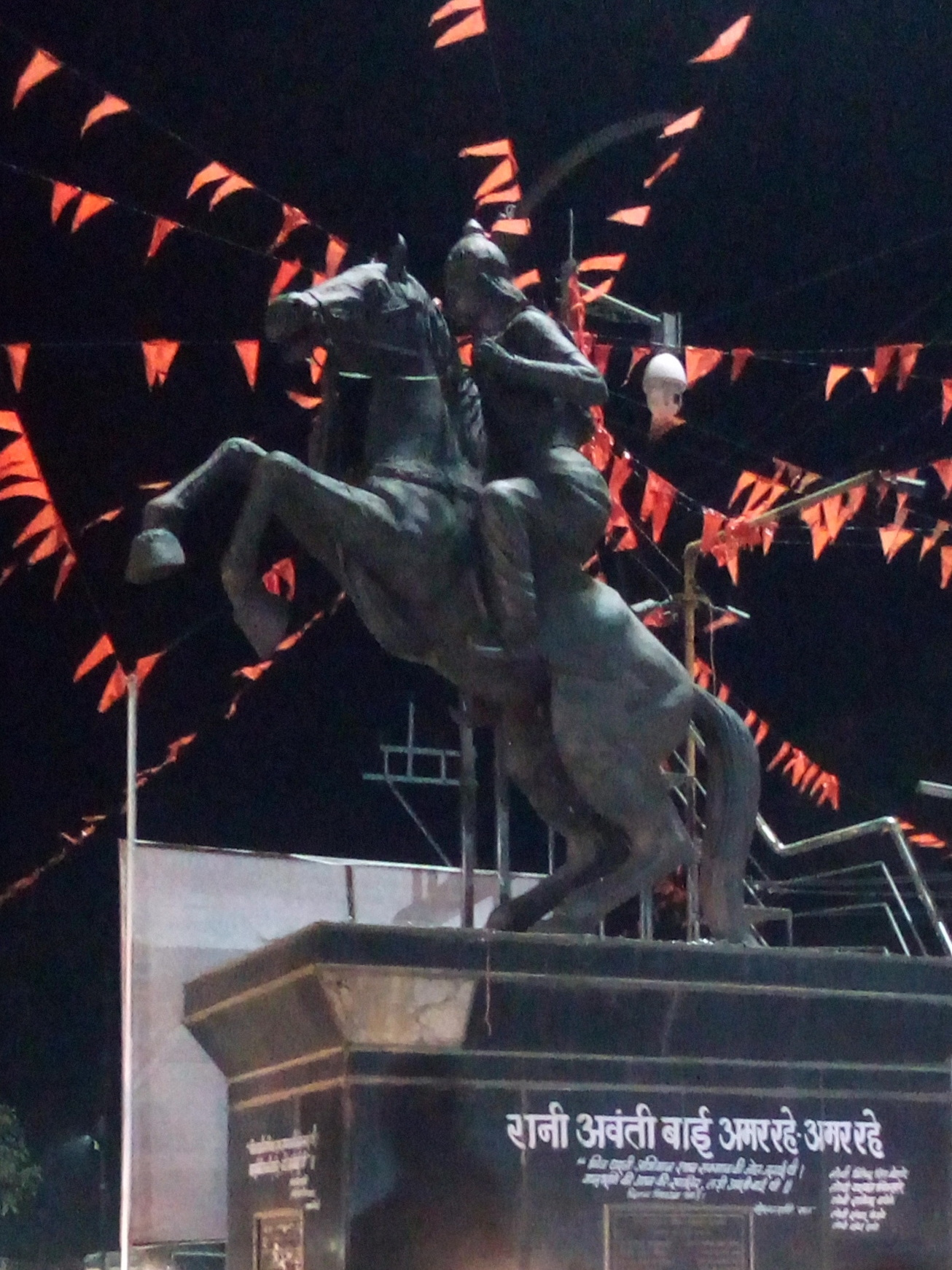
Statue of Rani Avantibai, Balaghat district, Madhya Pradesh

== Early life ==
Avantibai Lodhi was born in a Hindu Lodhi family on 16 August 1831 in Mankehadi village district Seoni in the house of Zamindar Rao Jujhar Singh. She was married to Prince Vikramaditya Singh Lodhi, the son of Raja Laxman Singh of Ramgarh (present-day Dindori). They had two children, Kunwar Aman Singh and Kunwar Sher Singh.

== Queen regent ==
In 1850 Raja Laxman Singh died and Raja Vikramaditya assumed the throne. Both his sons were still minor when the king became ill. As a Queen regent she efficiently administered state affairs. As the guardian of the minor sons, on hearing the news, the British took the action of "Court of Wards" to the state of Ramgarh and appointed Sheikh Sarbarahkar for the administration of the state. He along with Mohammed Abdullah were sent to Ramgarh. Considering this as an insult, the queen expelled Sarbarahkars from Ramgarh.

In midst of this, the king died and the whole responsibility came onto queen. She ordered the farmers of the state not to obey the instructions of the British. This reform work increased the popularity of the queen.

=== Indian rebellion of 1857 ===
Rani Avantibai got the responsibility of publicity for organizing the huge conference led under the chairmanship of Gond Raja Shankar Shah. Discharging her responsibility, the queen sent glass bangles along with the letter to the kings and landlords of the neighboring states and wrote in the letter

Either tighten your waist to protect the motherland or sit at home wearing glass bangles, you should fulfill the oath to your religion

Whoever read this message got ready to sacrifice everything for the country. The echo of the queen's appeal resonated far and wide and according to the plan; all the surrounding kings united against the British. When the revolt of 1857 broke out, Avantibai raised and led an army of 4000. Her first battle with the British took place in the village of Khairi near Mandla, where she and her army were able to defeat the British Deputy Commissioner Waddington and his forces such that they had to flee from Mandla. However, stung by the defeat the British came back with vengeance along with the help of King of Rewa and launched an attack on Ramgarh. Avantibai moved to the hills of Devharigarh for safety. The British army set fire to Ramgarh and turned to Devhargarh to attack the queen.

Avantibai resorted to guerilla warfare to fend off the British army. However, when facing almost certain defeat in battle, she sacrificed her life for the protection of the motherland by piercing herself with her sword on 20 March 1858. Rani achieved veergati at a place called Sukhi-Talaiya between Balapur and Ramgarh. After this, the movement was suppressed from this area and Ramgarh also came under British control.

== Samadhi of Rani ==
In Ramgarh, some distance away from the ruins of the palace towards the bottom of hill, there is a tomb of Rani, which is in very dilapidated condition. There are tombs of other people of Ramgarh dynasty also near this.

== Legacy ==
After India's independence, Avantibai has been remembered through performances and folklore. One such folk song is of the Gond people, a forest dweller tribe of the region, which says:

The Rani who is our mother, strikes repeatedly at the British. She is the chief of the jungles. She sent letters and bangles to other (rulers, chieftains) and aligned them to the cause. She vanquished and pushed the Britishers out, in every street she made them panic, so that they ran away wherever they could find their way. Whenever she entered the battleground on horseback, she fought bravely and swords and spears ruled the day. O, she was our Rani mother

She is among the viranganas (heroic women) lauded by groups of people involved in the events of 1857, other examples of whom include Rani Lakshmibai, Rani Durgavati, Rani Asha Devi, Jhalkari Bai, Rani Mahabiri Devi and Rani Uda Devi in north India and Rani Velu Nachiyar, Kuyili, Rani Kittur Chennamma and Rani Abbakka Chowta in south India.

In 1988–1989, a park has been built by Government besides remnants of the palace and temple of Radhakrishna (built by descendants of Ramgarh dynasty). A huge white coloured statue of Rani riding a horse has been installed in the park.

Although little is known of Avantibai except through folklore, her story merited a brief inclusion in the National Council of Educational Research and Training (NCERT) history textbooks from 2012 as a participant in the 1857 rebellion, after parliamentary protests from the Bharatiya Janata Party and Bahujan Samaj Party (BSP). Although she was a Lodhi queen, The BSP, in particular, had been using the story of Avantibai, along with accounts of other Dalit folk viranganas, as a means to promote the image of Mayawati, with her biographer Ajoy Bose commenting that she is cast as their "modern avatar".

The Narmada Valley Development Authority named a part of the Bargi Dam project in Jabalpur in her honour.

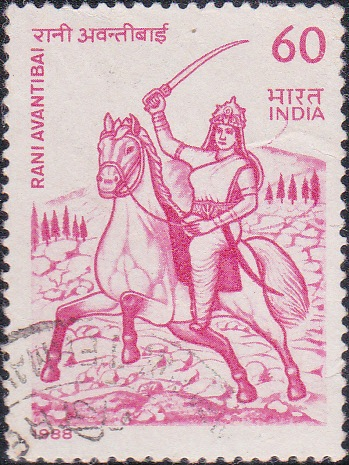
First Stamp Of 'Rani Avantibai'

India Post has issued two stamps in honour of Avantibai, on 20 March 1988 and on 19 September 2001.

== See also ==
- NCERT textbook controversies
- Rani of Jhansi
- Rani Durgavati
- Kuyili
- Bundelkhand
