= Niwas Assembly constituency =

Constituency of the Madhya Pradesh legislative assembly in India

Coordinates: 23.04°N 80.44°E

Niwas
- Constituency No. 106 for the Madhya Pradesh Legislative Assembly

Constituency details
- Country: India
- Region: Central India
- State: Madhya Pradesh
- District: Mandla
- Lok Sabha constituency: Mandla
- Established: 1972
- Reservation: ST

Member of Legislative Assembly
- 16th Madhya Pradesh Legislative Assembly
- Incumbent Chainsingh Warkade
- Party: Indian National Congress
- Elected year: 2023
- Preceded by: Ashok Marskole

Niwas is one of the 230 Vidhan Sabha (Legislative Assembly) constituencies of Madhya Pradesh state in central India.

It comprises Niwas tehsil, and parts of Mandla tehsil, both in Mandla district. As of 2023, it is represented by Chainsingh Warkade of the Indian National Congress.

== Members of the Legislative Assembly ==
Election	Name	Party
1957	Shahju	Indian National Congress
1962	Shahju	Indian National Congress
1967	F. Singh	Indian National Congress
1972	Anoopsingh Harisingh	Bharatiya Jana Sangh
1977	Rup Singh	Janata Party
1980	Dalpat Singh Uike	Indian National Congress (Indira)
1985	Dayal Singh Tumrachi	Indian National Congress
1990	Faggan Singh Kulaste	Bharatiya Janata Party
1993	Dayal Singh Tumrachi	Indian National Congress
1998	Surata Singh Maravi	Indian National Congress
2003	Rampriye Kulaste	Bharatiya Janata Party
2008	Rampriye Kulaste	Bharatiya Janata Party
2013	Rampriye Kulaste	Bharatiya Janata Party
2018	Ashok Marskole	Indian National Congress
2023	Chainsingh Warkade	Indian National Congress

== Election results ==
=== 2023 ===
2023 Madhya Pradesh Legislative Assembly election: Niwas (ST)
Party	Candidate	Votes	%	±%
INC	Chainsingh Warkade	99,644	45.73	−2.21
BJP	Faggan Singh Kulaste	89,921	41.27	+8.25
GGP	Devendra Maravi 'Bhoi'	19,264	8.84	−2.67
Kranti Janshakti Party	Manmohan Singh Gouthariya	2,884	1.32	
NOTA	None of the above	4,346	1.99	−0.82
Majority		9,723	4.46	−10.46
Turnout		217,895	82.43	+3.42
INC hold		Swing		

=== 2018 ===
2018 Madhya Pradesh Legislative Assembly election: Niwas
Party	Candidate	Votes	%	±%
INC	Ashok Marskole	91,007	47.94	
BJP	Rampyare Kulaste	62,692	33.02	
GGP	Rammu Lal Kulaste	21,852	11.51	
BSP	Anita Uikey	3,715	1.96	
Sapaks Party	Rajkumar Marawi	2,763	1.46	
Independent	Ghanshyam Kudape	2,483	1.31	
NOTA	None of the above	5,327	2.81	
Majority		28,315	14.92	
Turnout		189,839	79.01	
INC gain from BJP		Swing		
