= Shahpura, Dindori =

Shahpura
- town
- Nickname: Local body. =. Dharegaon
- Location in Madhya Pradesh, India Shahpura (India)
- Coordinates: 23.18°N 80.700495°E
- Country: India
- State: Madhya Pradesh
- District: Dindori

Government
  - Body: City Council
- Elevation: 381 m (1,250 ft)

Population (2011)
  - Total: 250,000

Languages
  - Official: Hindi
- Time zone: UTC+5:30 (IST)
- Postal code: 481990
- ISO 3166 code: IN-MP
- Vehicle registration: MP

Shahpura is Tehsil in Dindori district in the Indian state of Madhya Pradesh. Shahpura the PIN code is 481990.

== Geography ==
Shahpura is located at 23.18°N 80.70°E. It has an average elevation of 381 metres (1249 feet). Shahpura City is Located very close to 1 Maa Sharda tekri, 2 Gugwa National Park, 3 Radha krishna Temple Radha Rani Chock, 4 Ram Temple bajar chock, 5 Durga Temple & hanuman Temple, 6, Paras Nath, 7 Hlhl stream, 8 Mrwari Dame, 9 Bdkera ashram temple, 10 Badaa dev temple Bargaon, 11 Malpur sangam Wharf Narmada River,12 Kosam Wharf Narmada River,13 Takin Wharf Narmada River, 14 Bilgada dam.

== Demographics ==
As of 2001 India census, Shahpura had a population of 25098. Males constitute 51% of the population and females 49%. Shahpura has an average literacy rate of 71%, higher than the national average of 59.5%: male literacy is 79%, and female literacy is 62%. In Shahpura, 13% of the population is under 6 years of age.

== Administration ==
Shahpura is an intermediate panchayat under Dindori Zilla Panchayat. Gram Panchayats in Shahpura intermediate panchayat are: Amera, Amthera, Badhaigarh Mal, Badjhar, Banki Mal, Bargaon, Barkheda, Barodi Mal, Bastara Mal, Bhalapuri, Bharothi Mal, Bhilai Mal, Bhimpar, Bichiya, Bijori Mal, Bilgaon, Chandwahi Mal, Chapara Ryt, Cheerpani, Dadargaon, Dalka Khamhariya, Dalka Sarai Mal, Devgaon, Dewari Kala, Dewari Khurd, Dewari Mal, Dhirwan Kala, Dhirwankhurd, Dhodha Ryt, Dobhi, Dooba Mal, Dullopur, Ganeshpur, Guraiya Mal, Gutalwah, Indori Mal, Jhagrehata Dungariya, Kachari Mal, Kanchanpur Mal, Karigadahari Mal, Karondi Mal, Kasturi Pipariya, Katangi, Kehenjara, Khairbhagdu Mal, Kohani Dewari Kala, Magar Tagar, Manikpur, Marwari, and Mataka Ryt.
