= Arjun Singh Dhurve =

Indian folk dancer and retired teacher

Arjun Singh Dhurve (born 12 August 1953) is a folk dancer and a retired teacher from the Dindori district of the Indian State of Madhya Pradesh. He is famous for popularising Baiga folk songs and dance. Baiga Pardhauni dance is the main dance of the Baiga tribe. In this form of dance, the performers wear the masks of peacocks, elephants, horses, etc.

== Early life ==
Arjun Singh Dhurve was born on 12 August 1952 to Parsa Singh Dhurve (father) and Laharo Bai Dhurve (mother). He has secured B Ed degree in education and MA degree in sociology. He was the first post graduate degree holder from the Baiga tribe. He started his work as an assistant teacher in 1976. He was Promoted to higher grade teacher in 1994 and to the post of head teacher in 2008 and retired from service in 2015.

Arjun Singh and his team have given many performances of the Baiga dance within and outside Madhya Pradesh. In the year 2005, in the Republic Day Parade at India Gate, New Delhi, Arjun Singh and his team performed Baiga Pradini dance. He also presented the program at the residences of the then President APJ Abdul Kalam and Prime Minister Dr. Manmohan Singh.

== Recognition: Padma Shri ==
- In the year 2022, Govt of India conferred the Padma Shri award, the third highest award in the Padma series of awards, on Arjun Singh Dhurve for his distinguished service in the field of art. The award is in recognition of his service as a "Baiga Tribal Dancer and Singer from Dindori, performing the dying art form for over four decades".

== Other recognitions/achievements ==
- Tulsi Samman by Madhya Pradesh Govt (1993-94)
- Authored a book titled "Baiga Geet: Baiga Janjaati ke Prachalit Paramparik Geet" which was published in 2010 by Adivasi Lok Kala evam Boli Vikas Academy, Madhaya Pradesh Sanskriti Parishad. (The book is available for free download at Internet Archive.)

== See also ==
- Padma Shri Award recipients in the year 2022
