= Bargi Dam =

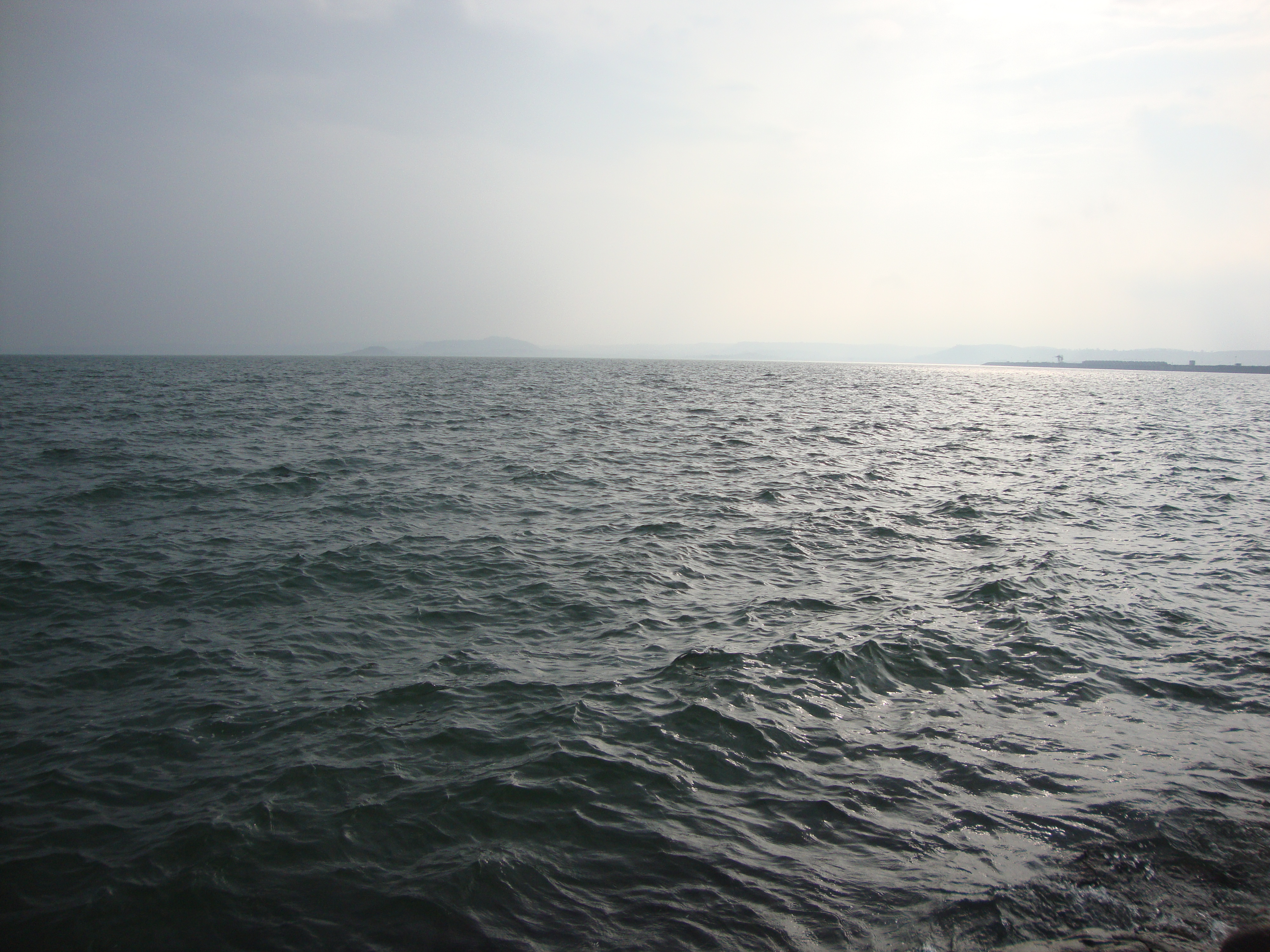
- Dam's reservoir
- Interactive map of Bargi Dam
- Location: Bargi, Jabalpur District, Madhya Pradesh
- Status: Operational
- Construction began: 1975
- Opening date: 1988
- Owner: Government of Madhya Pradesh
- Operators: Narmada Valley Development Department (NVDD), Water Resources Department Madhya Pradesh (MPWRD)

Dam and spillways
- Type of dam: Gravity dam
- Impounds: Narmada River
- Height: 69.80 m (229.0 ft)
- Length: 5,357 m (17,575 ft)
- Spillways: 21 Radial Gates of size 13.71 m (l) * 15.25 m (h)
- Spillway type: Ogee
- Spillway capacity: 45,296 m^{3}/s (1,599,600 cu ft/s)

Reservoir
- Creates: Bargi Dam Reservoir
- Total capacity: 3,920,000,000 m^{3} (3,180,000 acre⋅ft) (138.45 tmc ft)
- Active capacity: 3,180,000,000 m^{3} (2,580,000 acre⋅ft) (112.32 tmc ft)
- Inactive capacity: 740,000,000 m^{3} (600,000 acre⋅ft) (26.14 tmc ft)
- Catchment area: 14,556 km^{2} (5,620 sq mi)
- Surface area: 267.97 km^{2} (103.46 sq mi)
- Maximum length: 75 km (47 mi)
- Maximum width: 4.5 km (2.8 mi)
- Normal elevation: 422.76 m (1,387.0 ft)

Power Station
- Operator: MPPGCL
- Turbines: Dam: 2 × 45 MW Francis turbine Canal: 2 × 7.5 MW Kaplan-type
- Installed capacity: 105 MW

Bargi Dam is one of the first completed dams out of the chain of 30 major dams to be constructed on Narmada River in Madhya Pradesh, India. It has 21 gates. Two major irrigation projects, named Bargi Diversion Project and Rani Avantibai Lodhi Sagar Project, have been developed by the Bargi Dam administration.
