= Mohan Lal Jhikram =

Indian politician

Mohan Lal Jhikram (1 August 1919, in Dindori in Mandla district (Madhya Pradesh) – 6 June 2010) was a leader of Indian National Congress from Madhya Pradesh. He served as member of the Lok Sabha representing Mandla (Lok Sabha constituency). He was elected to 8th, 9th and 10th Lok Sabha.
