= Basori Singh Masram =

Indian politician

Member of Parliament, 15th Lok Sabha
- In office 2009–2014
- Preceded by: Faggan Singh Kulaste
- Succeeded by: Faggan Singh Kulaste
- Constituency: Mandla

MLA
- Constituency: Bajag

Personal details
- Born: 29 November 1945 Dugariya, District. Mandla (Madhya Pradesh)
- Party: Indian National Congress
- Spouse: Jeera Bai (m. 1970)
- Children: 2 daughters and 2 sons
- Parents: Dhiraj Singh Masram (father); Bhaddabai Masram (mother)
- Education: Under Matriculate
- Alma mater: Higher Secondary School, Bichhiya
- As of 9, 2012 Source: []

Basori Singh Masram (born 29 November 1945, in Village Dugariya, Mandla district) is an Indian politician, belonging to Indian National Congress. In the 2009 election he was elected to the 15th Lok Sabha from the Mandla Lok Sabha constituency of Madhya Pradesh.

He was earlier Sarpanch for Gram Panchayat Bodar Block Karanjiya. During 1993-1998 he was member of Madhya Pradesh Assembly.

He is an agriculturist and resides at Dindori district. He is married to Jeera bai and has two daughters and two sons.
