= Dindori, Madhya Pradesh =

Dindori
- Town
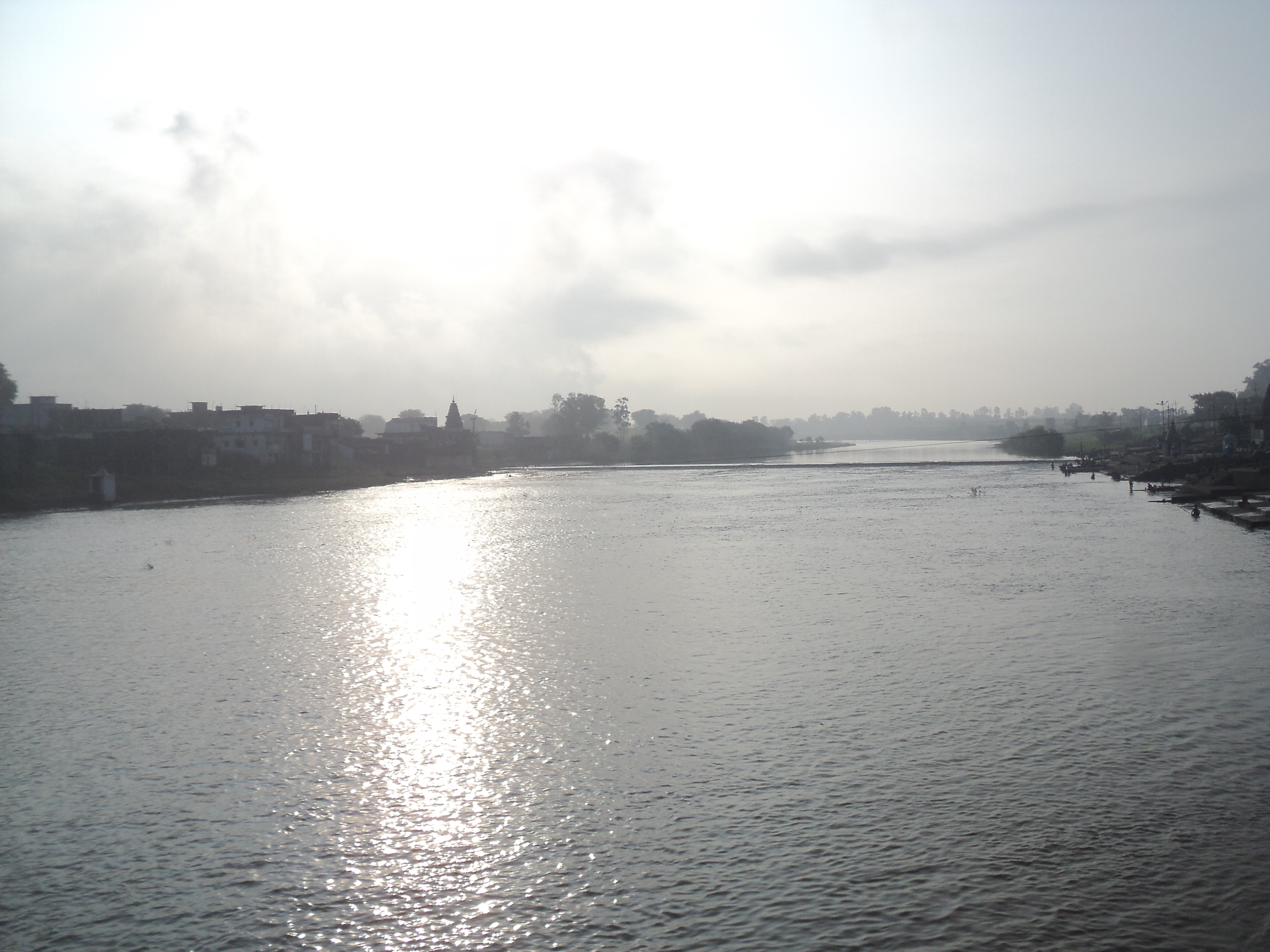
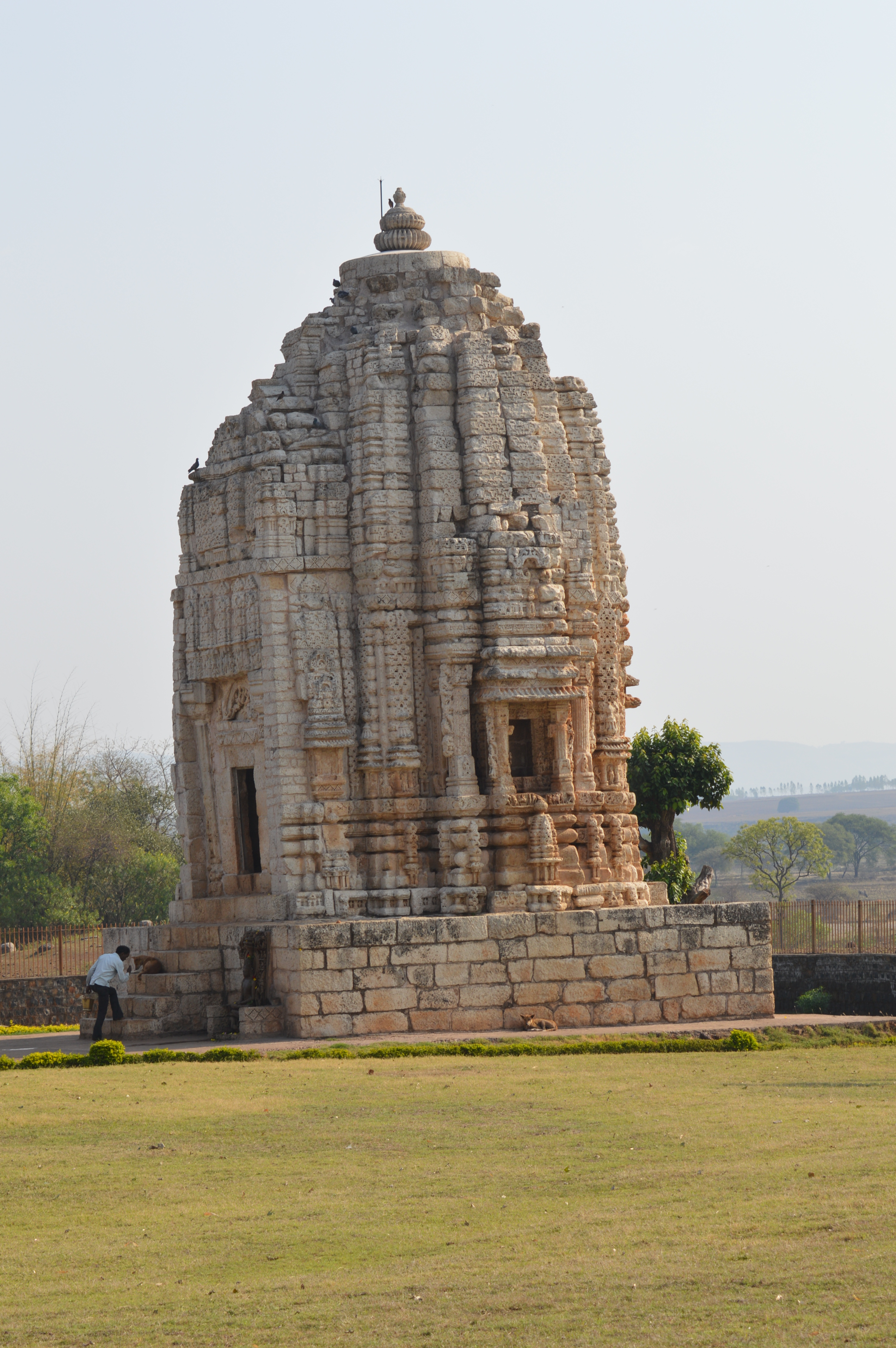
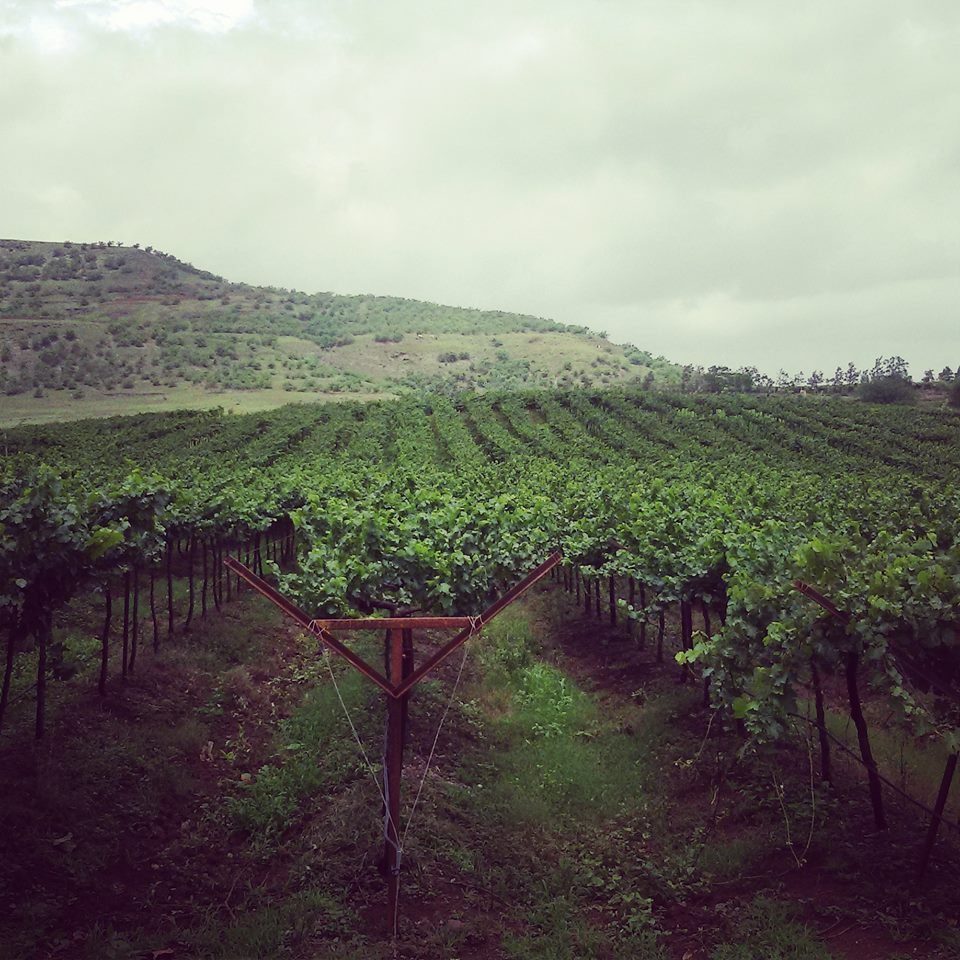
- Rinmukteshwar Mandir Dindori, Narmada in Dindori, Farms near Dindori,

- Location in Madhya Pradesh, India Dindori (India)
- Coordinates: 22.95°N 81.08°E
- Country: India
- State: Madhya Pradesh
- District: Dindori
- Elevation: 640 m (2,100 ft)

Population (2001)
  - Total: 17,413

Languages
  - Official: Hindi
- Time zone: UTC+5:30 (IST)
- Vehicle registration: MP-52
- Website: dindori.nic.in

Dindori is the headquarters of Dindori district, Madhya Pradesh, India. It was created on 25th May 1998 with total 927 villages. The district is a part of Jabalpur Division.

== History ==
Being a part of Mandla district, it has been under the Gond rulers. Ramgarh is often remembered through folklore of Rani Avantibai Lodhi.

== Geography ==
Dindori is located at 22.95°N 81.08°E. It has an average elevation of 640 metres (2,099 feet).

== Demographics ==
As of 2011 India census, Dindori had a population of 21,323. Males constitute 52% of the population and females 48%. Dindori has an average literacy rate of 71%: male literacy is 79% and, female literacy is 62%. In Dindori, 13% of the population is under 6 years of age.

== Economy ==
There is no industry in Dindori, people are dependent on agriculture, and farming is also done in the traditional way. The yield is very small, resulting in high poverty and unemployment.

== Notable people ==
- Avantibai, an Indian queen-ruler and freedom fighter
- Arjun Singh Dhurve, folk dancer, Padma Shri honored

== Transportation ==
Dindori can be reached by air from Dumna airport in Jabalpur, 146 km from Dindori, by rail from Jabalpur with 146 km Pendra road with 115 km and Umaria with 108 km from Dindori, or public buses from nearby major cities of Jabalpur, Mandla, Bilaspur and Shahdol.

== See also ==
- Gadasarai
