= Dindori district =

Coordinates: 22°57′N 81°05′E

- District of Madhya Pradesh
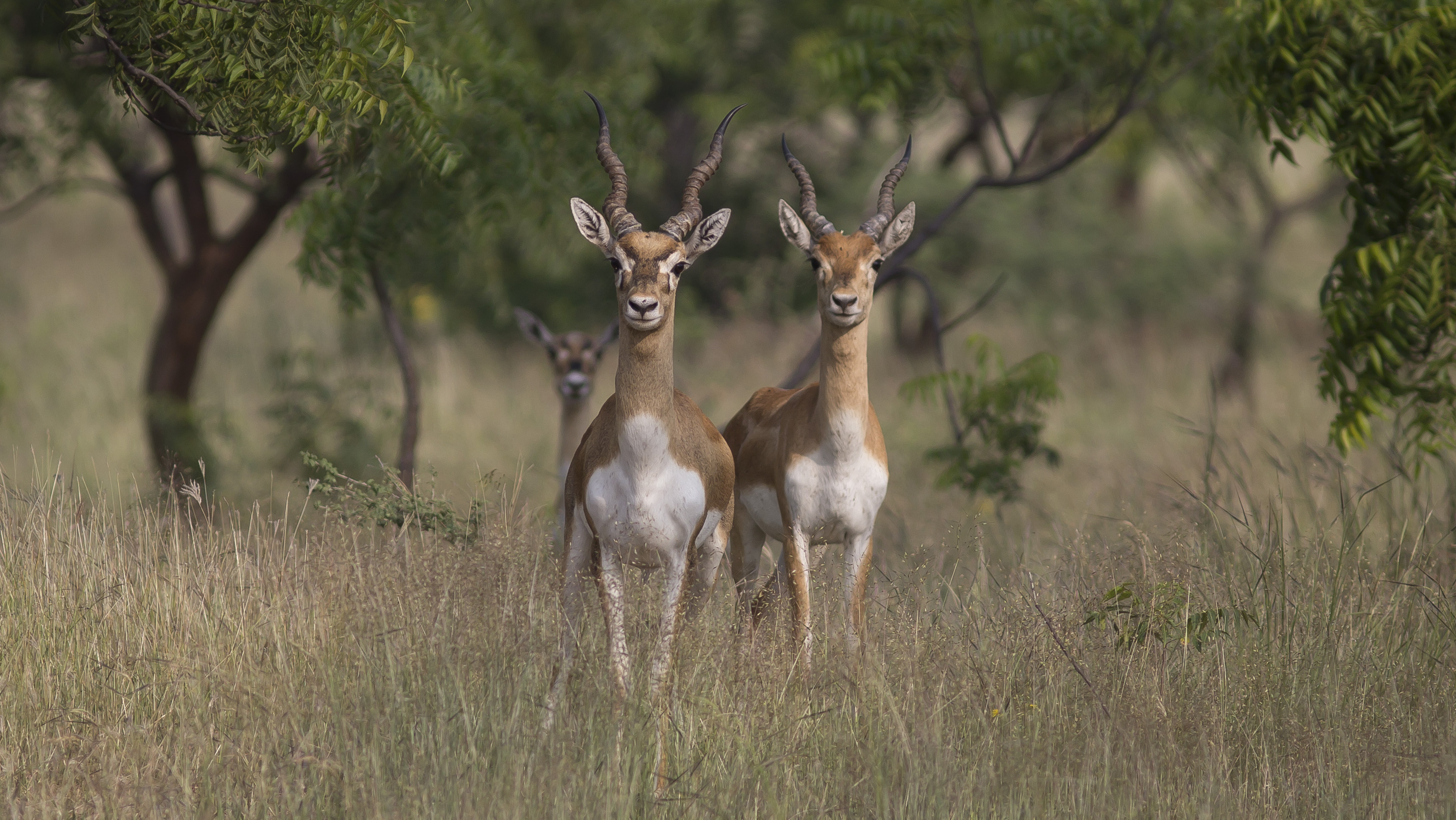
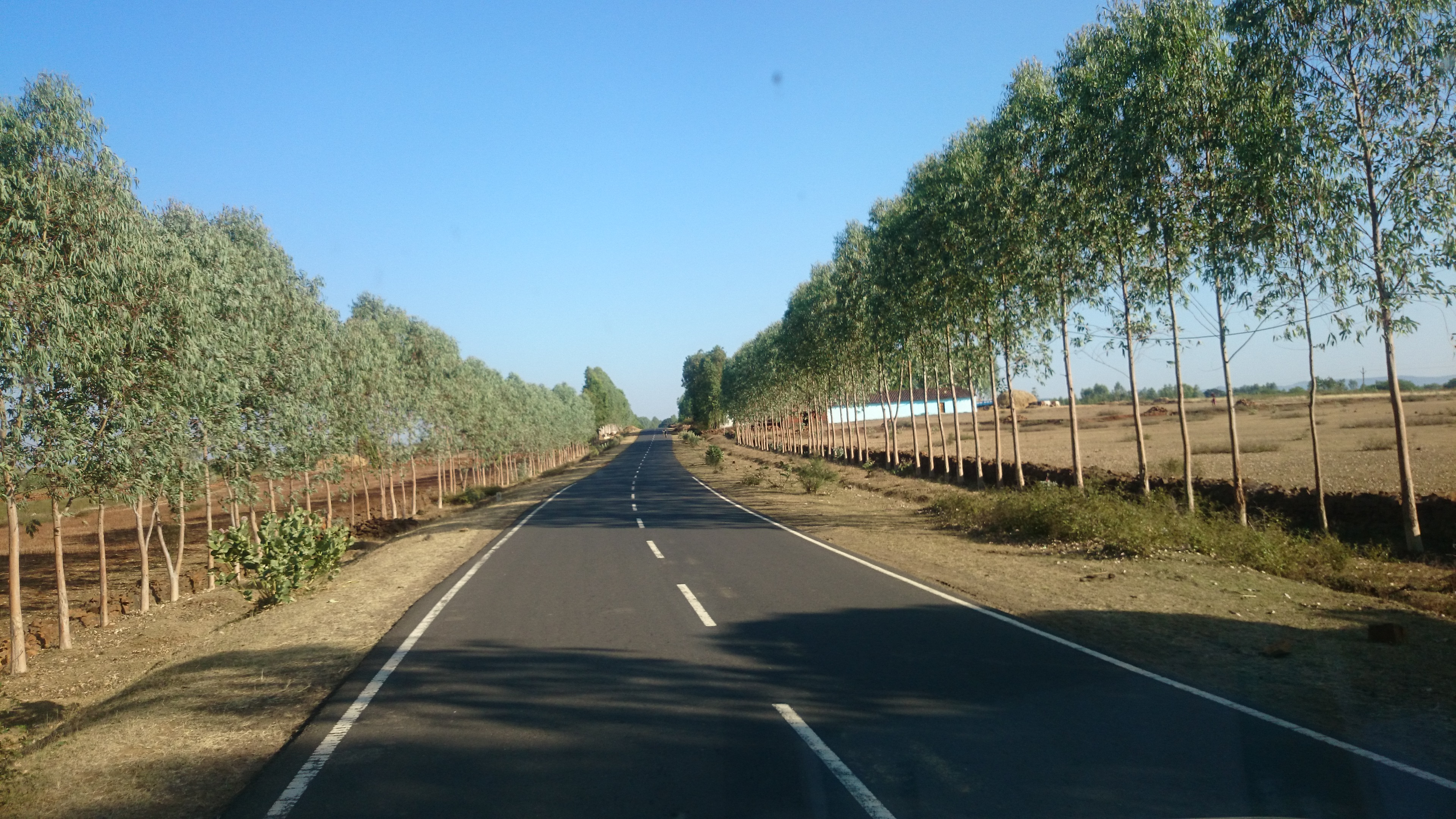
- Black Buck in Karopani. Highway in Dindori District

- Location of Dindori district in Madhya Pradesh
- Country: India
- State: Madhya Pradesh
- Division: Jabalpur
- Headquarters: Dindori

Area
  - total: 6,128 km^{2} (2,366 sq mi)

Population (2011)
  - total: 704,524
  - Density: 115.0/km^{2} (297.8/sq mi)

Demographics
  - Literacy: 63.90%
  - Sex ratio: 1002
- Time zone: UTC+05:30 (IST)
- Website: dindori.nic.in

Dindori district (Hindi pronunciation: [ɖɪɳɖɔːɾiː]), formerly known as Ramgarh district, is a district of Madhya Pradesh state of central India. The town of Dindori is the district headquarters. The district is part of Jabalpur Division.

== Economy ==
In 2006, the Ministry of Panchayati Raj named Dindori as one of the country's 250 most backward districts (out of a total of 640). It is one of the 24 districts in Madhya Pradesh currently receiving funds from the Backward Regions Grant Fund Programme (BRGF).

== Sub Divisions ==
Tehsil :

1. Dindori
2. Shahpura
3. Bajag
4. Samnapur (Proposed)

Development Block :

1. Bajag
2. Karanjiya
3. Shahpura
4. Mehandwani
5. Dindori
6. Amarpur
7. Samnapur

=== Villages ===
- Sursatola
- Gadasarai
- Sunpuri
- Sagartola
- Bondar

== Demographics ==
Historical population
Year	Pop.	±% p.a.
1901	111,229	—
1911	141,572	+2.44%
1921	135,008	−0.47%
1931	155,732	+1.44%
1941	176,280	+1.25%
1951	191,316	+0.82%
1961	263,940	+3.27%
1971	333,704	+2.37%
1981	409,677	+2.07%
1991	511,849	+2.25%
2001	580,730	+1.27%
2011	704,524	+1.95%

Religions in Dindori district (2011)
Religion	Percent
Hinduism	85.94%
Other (tribal religion)	11.92%
Islam	0.96%
Christianity	0.60%
Other or not stated	0.58%

According to the 2011 census, Dindori District has a population of 704,524, roughly equal to the nation of Bhutan or the US state of Alaska. This gives it a ranking of 501st in India (out of a total of 640). The district has a population density of 94 inhabitants per square kilometre (240/sq mi) . Its population growth rate over the decade 2001-2011 was 21.26%. Dindori has a sex ratio of 1,002 females for every 1,000 males, and a literacy rate of 63.90%. 4.59% of the population lives in urban areas. Scheduled Castes and Scheduled Tribes made up 5.65% and 64.69% of the population respectively. Gonds make up around 50% of the district's population.

=== Languages ===
Languages of Dindori district (2011)
1. Hindi (82.8%)
2. Gondi (14.1%)
3. 'Other' Hindi (1.10%)
4. Others (2.03%)

At the time of the 2011 Census of India, 82.78% of the population in the district spoke Hindi and 14.09% Gondi as their first language. 1.10% of the population spoke languages recorded as 'Other' under Hindi.

Although most people return their language as "Hindi", the local dialect is mid-way between Chhattisgarhi and Bagheli.

== Tourist places ==
- Jhir jhira Waterfall
- Devnala Waterfall
- Neosa Waterfall

=== Ghughua Fossil Park ===
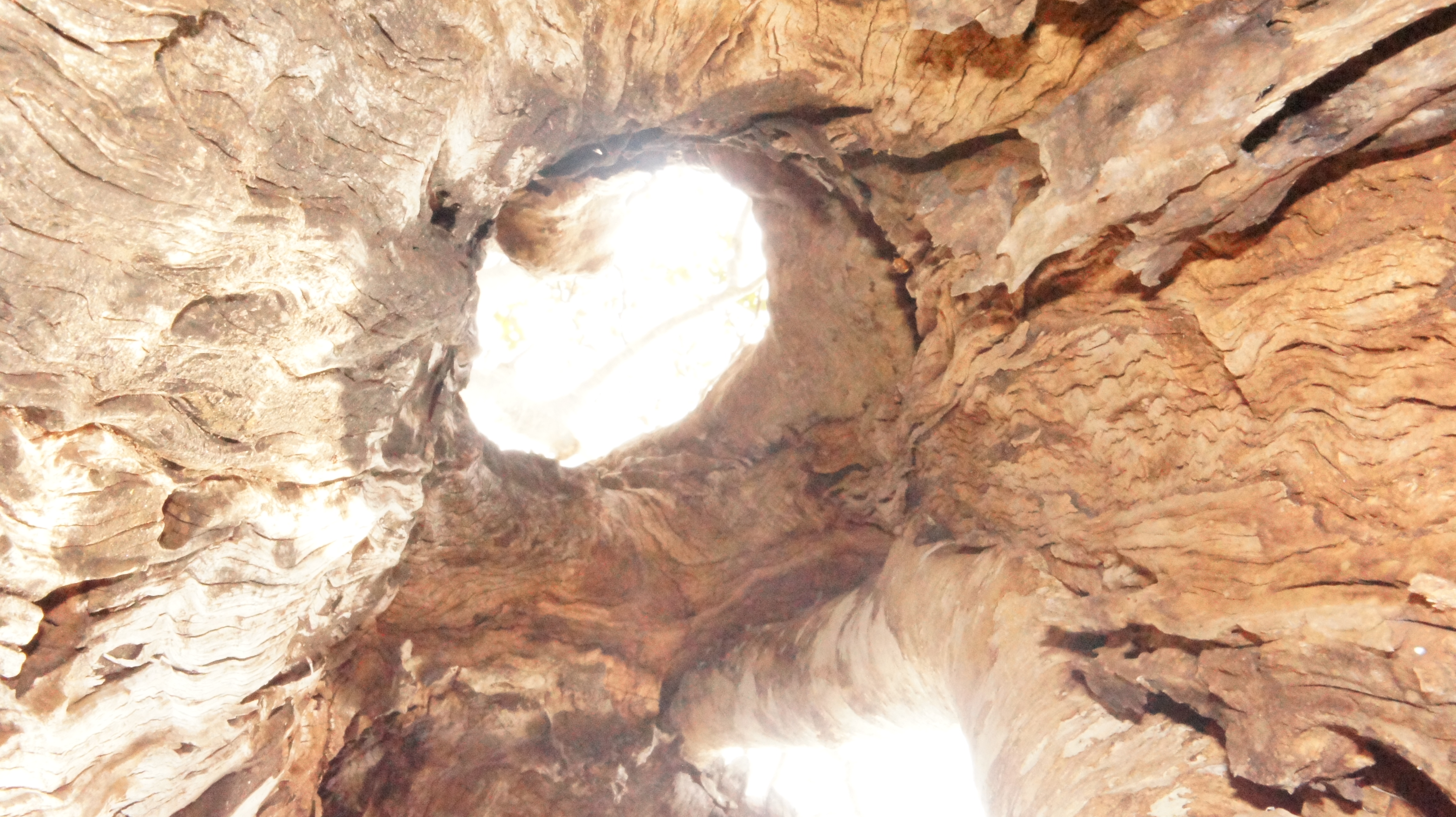
Rock formations at Ghughua Fossil Park

Ghughua Fossil Park is a National Park, located near Shahpura in Madhya Pradesh, India, in which plant fossils belonging to 31 genera of 18 families have been identified.

=== Karopani Natural Deer Park ===
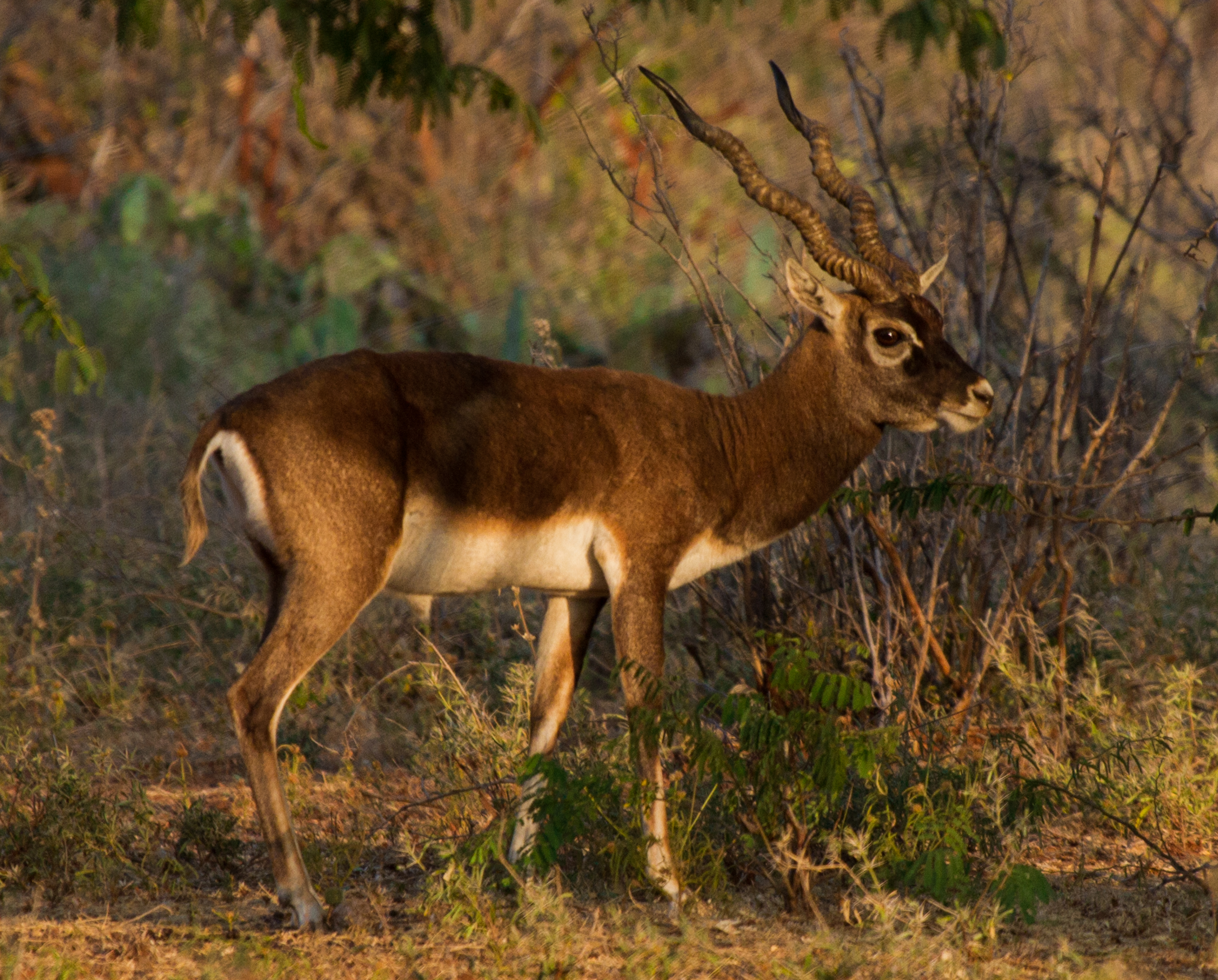
Karopani's black buck

Beautiful black and spotted deer can be seen in Karopani within the natural environment on the Jabalpur Bilaspur road in Dindori, surrounded by dense forests.

=== Kakurramath Mandir ===
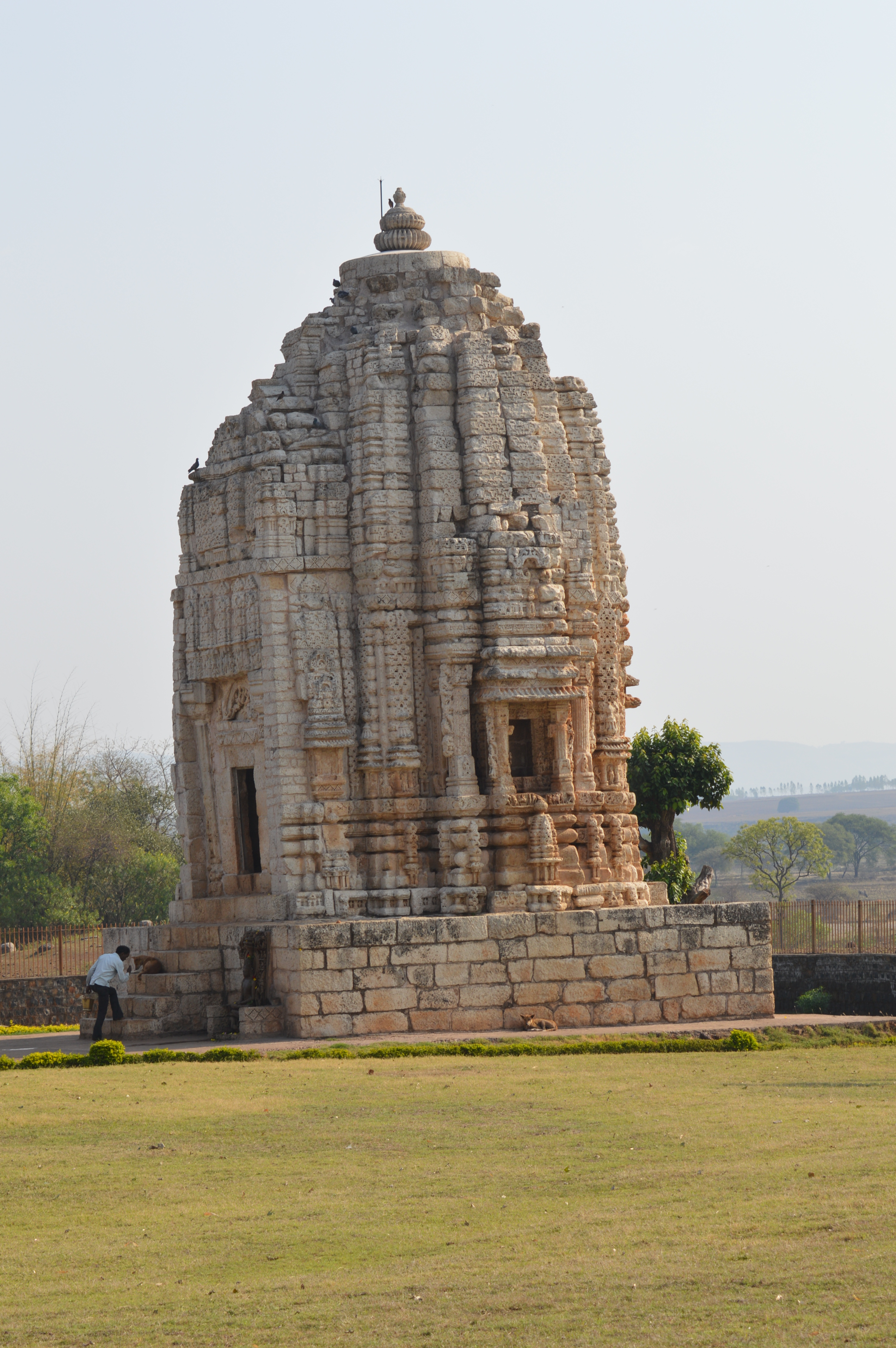
Kakurramath Temple

Located in Dindori district. This temple is dedicated to Lord Shiva, and is also known as “Rinmukteshwar Temple”. Worship and darshan in this temple gives relief from Pitra-debt, Dev-debt, and Guru-debt. People from nearby areas and most of the residents of Narmada Parikrama definitely come to visit the temple.

== Notable people ==
- Arjun Singh Dhurve, Folk Dancer, Honored Padmshri
- Basori Singh Masram, Indian Politician
- Bhaskar Bhagare, Indian Politician, Social Worker
- Verrier Elwin
