= Outline of Madhya Pradesh =

Overview of and topical guide to Madhya Pradesh

Location of Madhya Pradesh

The following outline is provided as an overview of and topical guide to Madhya Pradesh:

Madhya Pradesh – meaning "Central Province", is a state in central India. Its capital is Bhopal and the largest city is Indore. Nicknamed the "heart of India" due to its geographical location in India, Madhya Pradesh is the second-largest state in the country by area. Rich in mineral resources, MP has the largest reserves of diamond and copper in India.

== General reference ==
=== Names ===
- Common English name: Madhya Pradesh
  - Pronunciation: English: /ˌmʌdjə prəˈdɛʃ/, Hindi: [ˈmədʱjə pɾəˈdeːʃ]
- Official English name(s): Madhya Pradesh
- Nickname(s):
- Adjectival(s): Madhya Pradeshi
- Demonym(s): Madhya Pradeshis

=== Rankings (amongst India's states) ===
- by population: 5th
- by area (2011 census): 2nd
- by crime rate (2015): 2nd
- by gross domestic product (GDP) (2014): 9th
- by Human Development Index (HDI):
- by life expectancy at birth:
- by literacy rate:

== Geography of Madhya Pradesh ==
Geography of Madhya Pradesh

- Madhya Pradesh is: an Indian state
- Population of Madhya Pradesh: 72,597,565 (2011)
- Area of Madhya Pradesh: 308,245 km^{2} (119,014 sq mi)
- Atlas of Madhya Pradesh

=== Location of Madhya Pradesh ===
- Madhya Pradesh is situated within the following regions:
  - Northern Hemisphere
  - Eastern Hemisphere
    - Eurasia
      - Asia
        - South Asia
          - India
- Time zone: Indian Standard Time (UTC+05:30)

=== Environment of Madhya Pradesh ===
- Wildlife of Madhya Pradesh
  - Flora of Madhya Pradesh

==== Natural geographic features of Madhya Pradesh ====
- Rivers of Madhya Pradesh

=== Regions of Madhya Pradesh ===
==== Administrative divisions of Madhya Pradesh ====
===== Districts of Madhya Pradesh =====
- Districts of Madhya Pradesh

===== Municipalities of Madhya Pradesh =====
- Cities of Madhya Pradesh
  - Capital of Madhya Pradesh: Capital of Madhya Pradesh

=== Demography of Madhya Pradesh ===
Demographics of Madhya Pradesh

== Government and politics of Madhya Pradesh ==
Politics of Madhya Pradesh

- Form of government: Indian state government (parliamentary system of representative democracy)
- Capital of Madhya Pradesh: Bhopal
- Elections in Madhya Pradesh

=== Union government in Madhya Pradesh ===
- Rajya Sabha members from Madhya Pradesh
- Madhya Pradesh Pradesh Congress Committee
- Indian general election, 2009 (Madhya Pradesh)

=== Branches of the government of Madhya Pradesh ===
Government of Madhya Pradesh

==== Executive branch of the government of Madhya Pradesh ====
- Head of state: Governor of Madhya Pradesh,
- Head of government: Chief Minister of Madhya Pradesh,

==== Legislative branch of the government of Madhya Pradesh ====
Madhya Pradesh Legislative Assembly

- Constituencies of Madhya Pradesh Legislative Assembly

== History of Madhya Pradesh ==
History of Madhya Pradesh

== Culture of Madhya Pradesh ==
Culture of Madhya Pradesh

- Architecture of Madhya Pradesh
- Cuisine of Madhya Pradesh
- Monuments in Madhya Pradesh
  - Monuments of National Importance in Madhya Pradesh
  - State Protected Monuments in Madhya Pradesh
- World Heritage Sites in Madhya Pradesh

=== Art in Madhya Pradesh ===
- Music of Madhya Pradesh

=== People of Madhya Pradesh ===
- People from Madhya Pradesh

=== Religion in Madhya Pradesh ===
Religion in Madhya Pradesh

- Christianity in Madhya Pradesh

=== Sports in Madhya Pradesh ===
Sports in Madhya Pradesh

- Cricket in Madhya Pradesh
  - Madhya Pradesh Cricket Association
  - Madhya Pradesh cricket team
- Football in Madhya Pradesh
  - Madhya Pradesh football team

=== Symbols of Madhya Pradesh ===
Symbols of Madhya Pradesh

- State animal:बारहसिंहा
- State bird:दूधराज
- State flower:सफेद लिली
- State seal: Seal of Madhya Pradesh _
- State tree: साल

== Economy and infrastructure of Madhya Pradesh ==
Economy of Madhya Pradesh

- Madhya Pradesh Stock Exchange
- Tourism in Madhya Pradesh
- Transport in Madhya Pradesh
  - Airports in Madhya Pradesh
  - Rail transport in Madhya Pradesh

== Education in Madhya Pradesh ==
Education in Madhya Pradesh

- Institutions of higher education in Madhya Pradesh

== See also ==
- Outline of India
