= List of State Protected Monuments in Madhya Pradesh/ East & North Zone =

Government of Madhya Pradesh under Directorate of Archaeology, Archives and Museums has added as well as deleted and reorganised the monuments under four zones; viz. Bhopal Zone, Gwalior Zone, Indore Zone and Jabalpur Zone. The Districts of Madhya Pradesh are listed under these zones. The Monuments of each district are listed on a page with a short description and an image. 515 State Protected Monuments of Madhya Pradesh are listed in this format.

The East zone has following Districts :

- Anupur, Balaghat, Chindwara, Dindori, Jabalpur, Katni, Maihar, Mandla, Mauganj, Narsinhpur, Pandhurna, Rewa, Satna, Seoni, Shahdol, Sidhi, Singroli and Umaria

The North Zone has following Districts:

- Ashoknagar, Bhind, Chhatarpur, Damoh, Datia, Gwalior, Guna, Morena, Niwari, Panna, Sagar, Sheopur, Shivpur and Tikamgarh

The other State Protected Monuments are at List of State Protected Monuments in Madhya Pradesh/ Central & West Zone.

Besides the State Protected Monuments, the Monuments of National Importance in this state has primary sites.

== List of state protected monuments ==
SL. No.	Description	Location	Address	District	Coordinates	Image
S-MP-3	Hatta ki Bavdi	Hatta		Balaghat	21°43′15″N 80°16′22″E	Upload Photo
S-MP-8	Shiva Temple	Dang		Bhind	26°27′42″N 78°27′18″E	Upload Photo
S-MP-9	Shiva Temple	Birkhadi		Bhind	26°28′21″N 78°28′27″E	Upload Photo
S-MP-10	Gohad Fort	Banipura		Bhind	26°25′33″N 78°26′48″E	Gohad Fort More images
S-MP-11	Ancient site (a) Rahkola Devi temple,(b) ancient mound	Daboh		Bhind	25°59′18″N 78°53′28″E	Upload Photo
S-MP-12	Naya Mahal	Banipura		Bhind	26°25′24″N 78°26′54″E	Naya Mahal
S-MP-13	Devi Temple	Chomho		Bhind	26°43′09″N 78°37′32″E	Upload Photo
S-MP-14	Sitaram temple	Lawan		Bhind	26°31′15″N 78°27′02″E	Upload Photo
S-MP-15	Vishnu Temple	Barahed		Bhind	26°29′14″N 78°15′10″E	Upload Photo
S-MP-16	Lakshman Temple	Banipura		Bhind	26°25′24″N 78°26′47″E	Upload Photo
S-MP-17	Boreshwar Temple	Boreshwar		Bhind	26°40′49″N 78°45′59″E	Upload Photo
S-MP-18	Fort and Darbar Hall	Bhind		Bhind	26°33′34″N 78°47′44″E	Upload Photo
S-MP-19	Shiva Temple	Ater		Bhind	26°44′51″N 78°38′04″E	Upload Photo
S-MP-20	Devi temple	Ater		Bhind	26°44′52″N 78°38′04″E	Upload Photo
S-MP-21	Shiva Temple	Lawan		Bhind	26°31′22″N 78°27′11″E	Upload Photo
S-MP-22	Ancient temple	Chhimaka		Bhind	26°26′46″N 78°23′57″E	Upload Photo
S-MP-23	Ancient brick temple(Surya Mandir, Kupia Deva mandir)	Bharoli Kalan		Bhind	26°26′29″N 78°49′36″E	Upload Photo
S-MP-24	Vishnu Temple	Barhad		Bhind	26°28′25″N 78°33′33″E	Upload Photo
S-MP-25	Shiva Temple	Chomho		Bhind	26°43′10″N 78°37′32″E	Upload Photo
S-MP-26	Chhatri of Malhar Rao Holkar	Alampur		Bhind	26°01′22″N 78°47′56″E	Upload Photo
S-MP-42	Shantinath Jain Temple	Uradmau		Chhatarpur	25°05′14″N 79°44′55″E	Upload Photo
S-MP-43	Chatrasal ka Makbara	Mau Sahaniya		Chhatarpur	24°59′56″N 79°28′49″E	Chatrasal ka Makbara More images
S-MP-44	Dhubela Mahal	Mau Sahaniya		Chhatarpur	25°00′29″N 79°28′47″E	Dhubela Mahal More images
S-MP-45	Maharani Kamlapati samadhi	Mau Sahaniya		Chhatarpur	25°00′13″N 79°28′37″E	Maharani Kamlapati samadhi More images
S-MP-46	Shiv Yogini Temple	Barat Saderi		Chhatarpur	25°02′35″N 79°31′14″E	Upload Photo
S-MP-47	Bhimkund Group of Temples	Mau Sahaniya		Chhatarpur	25°00′25″N 79°28′26″E	Upload Photo
S-MP-48	Ganesh Temple (Gola Math)	Mau Sahaniya		Chhatarpur	25°01′23″N 79°29′45″E	Upload Photo
S-MP-49	Nagmandir	Mau Sahaniya		Chhatarpur	25°00′57″N 79°29′08″E	Upload Photo
S-MP-50	Ancient Shiva Temple	Khadgayn Chouka		Chhatarpur	24°50′04″N 79°29′19″E	Upload Photo
S-MP-51	Surya Temple	Banjari		Chhatarpur	25°00′05″N 80°11′07″E	Upload Photo
S-MP-52	Pournkadanta, Painted rock shelter	Deora, Bijawar		Chhatarpur	24°34′40″N 79°39′28″E	Upload Photo
S-MP-53	Putlikadanta, Painted rockshelter	Deora, Bijawar		Chhatarpur	24°34′40″N 79°39′28″E	Upload Photo
S-MP-54	Devra ka Kila	Deora, Bijawar		Chhatarpur	24°35′20″N 79°38′33″E	Upload Photo
S-MP-55	Dhanushdhari Temple	Alipura, Nowgaon		Chhatarpur	25°10′33″N 79°20′49″E	Upload Photo
S-MP-56	Bihariju Temple	Mau Sahania		Chhatarpur	25°01′16″N 79°29′37″E	Upload Photo
S-MP-57	Tomb of Sawai Singh	Mau Sahaniya		Chhatarpur	25°00′10″N 79°29′44″E	Tomb of Sawai Singh More images
S-MP-58	Tomb of Bercha Rani	Maheba		Chhatarpur	24°59′11″N 79°29′27″E	Upload Photo
S-MP-59	Maheba Gate	Maheba		Chhatarpur	24°59′43″N 79°28′38″E	Maheba Gate More images
S-MP-60	Chaturbhurj Temple	Achatt		Chhatarpur	24°58′47″N 79°21′17″E	Upload Photo
S-MP-61	Shiva Temple	Hindorabari		Chhatarpur	25°05′22″N 80°06′54″E	Upload Photo
S-MP-62	Shiva Temple	Brijpura		Chhatarpur		Upload Photo
S-MP-63	Shiva Temple	Byas Badaura		Chhatarpur	25°05′02″N 80°15′21″E	Shiva Temple More images
S-MP-64	Ancient Devi Temple	Byas Badaura		Chhatarpur	25°04′59″N 80°15′23″E	Ancient Devi Temple More images
S-MP-65	Gulganj Fort	Gulganj		Chhatarpur	24°41′57″N 79°22′29″E	Gulganj Fort More images
S-MP-66	Chhatri of Maharaja Pratap Singh	Khajuraho		Chhatarpur	24°51′08″N 79°55′25″E	Chhatri of Maharaja Pratap Singh More images
S-MP-67	Temple Pratap Juu	Khajuraho		Chhatarpur	24°51′11″N 79°55′20″E	Temple Pratap Juu More images
S-MP-68	Shiva Yogini Temple	Byas Badaura		Chhatarpur	25°04′59″N 80°15′24″E	Shiva Yogini Temple More images
S-MP-69	Kishangadh ki Gadhi	Kishangadh		Chhatarpur	24°28′09″N 79°44′54″E	Upload Photo
S-MP-70	Rukmani Math	Kundalpur		Damoh	23°59′30″N 79°43′16″E	Upload Photo
S-MP-71	Damyanti Gadhi	Damoh		Damoh	23°49′50″N 79°26′31″E	Upload Photo
S-MP-72	Chhatri of Maharaja Parikshit	Datia		Datia	25°40′13″N 78°28′08″E	Upload Photo
S-MP-73	Chhatri of Maharaja Indrajeet	Datia		Datia	25°40′14″N 78°28′09″E	Upload Photo
S-MP-74	Chhatri of Bhavani Singh	Datia		Datia	25°40′11″N 78°28′08″E	Upload Photo
S-MP-75	Chhatri of Maharaja Shahkarna	Datia		Datia	25°40′14″N 78°28′10″E	Upload Photo
S-MP-76	Shiva Temple	Bharroli (Bhander)		Datia	25°41′17″N 78°46′58″E	Upload Photo
S-MP-77	Surai	Sikandarpura		Datia	25°44′24″N 78°44′42″E	Upload Photo
S-MP-91	Two Chhatris of Nayapur	Chanderi		Ashoknagar	24°43′07″N 78°08′03″E	Upload Photo
S-MP-92	Two Chhatris of Chakla Bavri	Chanderi		Ashoknagar	24°42′31″N 78°08′10″E	Upload Photo
S-MP-93	Samadhi of Maharani Lakshmibai	Gwalior		Gwalior	26°12′44″N 78°10′24″E	Samadhi of Maharani Lakshmibai More images
S-MP-94	Raslilaghar	Gwalior		Gwalior	26°07′05″N 78°00′31″E	Upload Photo
S-MP-95	Moti Mahal	Gwalior		Gwalior	26°12′28″N 78°10′22″E	Moti Mahal More images
S-MP-96	Gwalior Fort (wall and Burj)	Gwalior		Gwalior	26°12′45″N 78°09′47″E	Gwalior Fort (wall and Burj) More images
S-MP-97	Karnamahal	Gwalior		Gwalior	26°13′54″N 78°10′09″E	Karnamahal More images
S-MP-98	Vikram mahal	Gwalior		Gwalior	26°13′53″N 78°10′10″E	Vikram mahal More images
S-MP-99	Jahangir mahal and Shahjahan Mahal	Gwalior		Gwalior	26°13′57″N 78°10′12″E	Jahangir mahal and Shahjahan Mahal More images
S-MP-100	Jauhar kund	Gwalior		Gwalior	26°13′59″N 78°10′09″E	Jauhar kund
S-MP-101	Chhatri of Bhimsena Rana	Gwalior		Gwalior	26°14′01″N 78°10′10″E	Chhatri of Bhimsena Rana More images
S-MP-102	Gujri Mahal	Gwalior		Gwalior	26°14′03″N 78°10′14″E	Gujri Mahal More images
S-MP-103	Dhumeshwar Mahadeva Temple	Dhumeshwar		Gwalior	25°45′27″N 78°13′32″E	Upload Photo
S-MP-104	Ladhedi Gate	Gwalior		Gwalior	26°14′25″N 78°10′08″E	Ladhedi Gate More images
S-MP-113	Shankar Math	Kunda, Sihora		Jabalpur		Upload Photo
S-MP-114	Ram Mandir	Matiyakui, Jabalpur		Jabalpur	23°18′11″N 79°58′20″E	Upload Photo
S-MP-115	Vishnu Varaha Temple	Majholi		Jabalpur	23°30′11″N 79°55′21″E	Upload Photo
S-MP-116	Mudhiya Shiva Temple	Garha		Jabalpur	23°09′31″N 79°54′42″E	Upload Photo
S-MP-117	Four Images on a Boulder	Sindursi, Sihora		Katni	23°39′17″N 80°03′27″E	Upload Photo
S-MP-118	Image of Maladevi	Jabalpur		Jabalpur	23°09′18″N 79°53′10″E	Upload Photo
S-MP-119	Inscription and Engraved Images of Tirthankaras	Imaliya, Sihora		Jabalpur		Upload Photo
S-MP-120	Vishnu Varaha Temple	Bhita		Jabalpur	23°11′11″N 79°37′03″E	Upload Photo
S-MP-121	Pachmatha Temple	Jabalpur		Jabalpur	23°09′33″N 79°54′22″E	Pachmatha Temple More images
S-MP-125	Place of Jogiya Baba and three images kept there	Dithwara		Katni	23°56′22″N 80°27′53″E	Place of Jogiya Baba and three images kept there More images
S-MP-126	Painted Rock- shelters, Nos. 1 to 15	Jhinjhari		Katni	23°48′08″N 80°21′51″E	Upload Photo
S-MP-127	Kalimata ki Madhiya	Karitalai		Katni		Upload Photo
S-MP-128	Vijayaraghavgadh Fort	Vijayraghavgarh		Katni	23°59′22″N 80°36′20″E	Vijayaraghavgadh Fort More images
S-MP-133	Moti Mahal, Mandla	Ramnagar		Mandla	22°36′52″N 80°30′41″E	Moti Mahal, Mandla More images
S-MP-134	Kothi of Raibhagat	Ramnagar		Mandla	22°36′50″N 80°30′57″E	Upload Photo
S-MP-135	Gadhi Raja Narendra Shah	Mandla		Mandla	22°35′16″N 80°22′11″E	Upload Photo
S-MP-136	Vishnu Temple	Ramnagar		Mandla	22°36′48″N 80°30′38″E	Upload Photo
S-MP-137	Mahal and Bavdi of Gond Raja	Simariya		Mandla		Upload Photo
S-MP-138	Image of Surya (Temple Ruins)	Mandla		Mandla		Upload Photo
S-MP-139	Gadhi of Hridayshah	Jagnathar		Mandla		Upload Photo
S-MP-150	Sabalgarh fort	Sabalgarh		Morena	26°14′27″N 77°24′25″E	Sabalgarh fort More images
S-MP-151	Surya temple (ancient temple, baradari)	Aiti		Morena	26°23′40″N 78°13′06″E	Surya temple (ancient temple, baradari) More images
S-MP-152	Vishnu Temple	Aiti		Morena	26°23′44″N 78°13′09″E	Vishnu Temple More images
S-MP-153	Ancient temple (Shiva Temple)	Bhainsora		Morena	26°28′20″N 78°13′33″E	Upload Photo
S-MP-154	Vishnu temple	Barahwali		Morena	26°24′43″N 78°12′22″E	Upload Photo
S-MP-155	Shiva Temple (ancient temple, gadhi ruins)	Barahwali		Morena	26°24′59″N 78°13′23″E	Upload Photo
S-MP-156	Gadhi and Mahal	Husainpur		Morena	26°37′20″N 77°56′33″E	Upload Photo
S-MP-157	Ganna Begam ka Makbara	Nurabad		Morena	26°24′15″N 78°04′02″E	Upload Photo
S-MP-158	Shiva Mandir (ruins)	Ardauni		Morena	26°27′36″N 78°11′34″E	Upload Photo
S-MP-159	Mahadeva Temple	Amleda		Morena	26°26′16″N 78°14′59″E	Upload Photo
S-MP-160	Gadhi	Sumaoli		Morena	26°22′28″N 77°54′59″E	Upload Photo
S-MP-161	Chaugan Fort	Chougan		Narsinghpur	22°45′31″N 78°55′39″E	Upload Photo
S-MP-162	Pandava Math-Jain Tirthankaras	Barheta		Narsinghpur	22°53′47″N 79°23′48″E	Upload Photo
S-MP-163	Someshwar Temple	Barmaan		Narsinghpur	23°01′50″N 79°01′15″E	Upload Photo
S-MP-164	Ancient Garuda Stambha	Barmaan		Narsinghpur	23°01′49″N 79°01′15″E	Upload Photo
S-MP-165	Image of Ambika Devi	Bachai		Narsinghpur	22°52′26″N 79°18′06″E	Upload Photo
S-MP-166	Chaturbhuji Balaji ki Madhiya	Bachai		Narsinghpur	22°52′26″N 79°18′06″E	Upload Photo
S-MP-179	Nand chand Shiv Temple	Nand chand		Panna	24°00′02″N 80°04′21″E	Nand chand Shiv Temple More images
S-MP-180	Vishnuvaraha Temple and other Images	Puraina		Panna	23°57′34″N 80°18′34″E	Upload Photo
S-MP-181	Dholiamath (Shiva Temple)	Khamariya		Panna	24°15′39″N 80°08′16″E	Upload Photo
S-MP-182	Hindupat palace museum	Panna		Panna	24°43′00″N 80°11′25″E	Upload Photo
S-MP-198	Keoti Fort	Keoti		Rewa	24°49′01″N 81°27′24″E	Keoti Fort More images
S-MP-199	Image of Bhairav	Khamdiya		Rewa	24°27′11″N 81°30′37″E	Image of Bhairav More images
S-MP-200	Ancient Brick Temple	Baijnath		Rewa	24°30′04″N 81°10′24″E	Upload Photo
S-MP-201	Gadhi	Gurh		Rewa	24°30′06″N 81°30′11″E	Upload Photo
S-MP-202	Kudiya Temple	Mahsaw		Rewa	24°30′47″N 81°25′19″E	Kudiya Temple More images
S-MP-203	Image of Hargauri	Rewa		Rewa	24°32′05″N 81°17′32″E	Upload Photo
S-MP-204	Harsiddhi Devi Temple	Rangir		Sagar	23°37′06″N 78°55′20″E	Harsiddhi Devi Temple More images
S-MP-205	Surya temple	Rehli		Sagar	23°38′03″N 79°03′53″E	Upload Photo
S-MP-206	Shiva Temple	Madhpiparia		Sagar	23°14′27″N 79°01′31″E	Upload Photo
S-MP-207	Digambar Jain Temple	Patnaganj Rehli		Sagar	23°38′04″N 79°04′06″E	Upload Photo
S-MP-208	Sanodha Fort	Sanodha		Sagar	23°53′16″N 78°54′32″E	Upload Photo
S-MP-209	Vishnu Temple	Binaika		Sagar	24°06′46″N 78°51′05″E	Vishnu Temple More images
S-MP-210	Lady Dufferin Hospital now District Archaeological Museum Sagar	Sagar		Sagar	23°50′18″N 78°44′49″E	Lady Dufferin Hospital now District Archaeological Museum Sagar More images
S-MP-211	Madhavagadh Fort	Madhawgadh		Satna	24°33′40″N 80°54′33″E	Madhavagadh Fort More images
S-MP-212	Paitani Devi Gupta Period Temple	Bihata Shankargarh		Satna	24°26′18″N 80°46′32″E	Paitani Devi Gupta Period Temple More images
S-MP-213	Gola Math	Maihar		Satna	24°16′05″N 80°44′47″E	Upload Photo
S-MP-214	Kunwar Math	Jaso		Satna	24°29′51″N 80°30′11″E	Upload Photo
S-MP-215	Gadhi	Amarpatan		Satna	24°19′00″N 80°58′40″E	Upload Photo
S-MP-216	Jalpa Devi Temple	Jaso		Satna	24°29′53″N 80°29′57″E	Upload Photo
S-MP-217	Ruins of Ancient sculptures	Umaria		Umariya	23°41′07″N 81°02′16″E	Upload Photo
S-MP-218	Devi Temple	Bachhara		Satna	24°23′29″N 81°04′48″E	Upload Photo
S-MP-219	Ancient mound	Atariyakhoh		Satna		Upload Photo
S-MP-220	Ancient Gadhi	Rampur Baghelan		Satna	24°30′08″N 81°03′22″E	Upload Photo
S-MP-221	Chamunda Temple	Antara		Shahdol	23°12′49″N 81°21′07″E	Upload Photo
S-MP-222	Panchmattha Temple	Singhpur		Shahdol	23°12′48″N 81°25′06″E	Upload Photo
S-MP-223	Kheramata ki Madhiya	Khamdand		Shahdol	24°04′47″N 81°22′18″E	Upload Photo
S-MP-232	Narwar Fort and Memorial	Narwar		Shivpuri	25°38′45″N 77°54′16″E	Narwar Fort and Memorial More images
S-MP-233	Shiva Mandir	Churelkhera		Shivpuri	25°43′58″N 77°44′40″E	Upload Photo
S-MP-234	Surya Temple	Shivpuri		Shivpuri	25°18′54″N 77°38′22″E	Surya Temple More images
S-MP-235	Vijaypur Fort	Vijaypur		Sheopur	26°03′15″N 77°22′12″E	Upload Photo
S-MP-236	Ghudsal Sheopur Fort	Sheopur		Sheopur	25°39′24″N 76°41′47″E	Ghudsal Sheopur Fort More images
S-MP-237	Makbara of Mohammad Munawwar Khan	Sheopur		Sheopur	25°40′21″N 76°41′53″E	Upload Photo
S-MP-238	Maharaja Nar Singh Mahal	Sheopur		Sheopur	25°39′23″N 76°41′49″E	Maharaja Nar Singh Mahal More images
S-MP-239	Manohar Das's Chhatri	Sheopur		Sheopur	25°39′24″N 76°41′44″E	Manohar Das's Chhatri More images
S-MP-240	Painted Rock- shelter	Gaura Mountain Bichhi Chitrangi		Singrauli		Upload Photo
S-MP-241	Bardi Fort	Bardi		Singrauli	24°32′38″N 82°22′26″E	Bardi Fort More images
S-MP-242	Ancient temple	Doraj Khurd		Singrauli	24°33′07″N 82°45′20″E	Upload Photo
S-MP-243	Painted Rock- Shelter	Rani Machi Chitrangi		Singrauli		Upload Photo
S-MP-244	Painted Rock- Shelter	Dholagiri Chitrangi		Singrauli		Upload Photo
S-MP-245	Rock-cut Cave	Mada		Singrauli	23°53′01″N 82°30′10″E	Upload Photo
S-MP-246	Ganesh Mada	Mada		Singrauli	23°53′43″N 82°28′53″E	Upload Photo
S-MP-247	Adegaon Fort	Adegaon		Seoni	22°37′02″N 79°29′16″E	Upload Photo
S-MP-248	Richaria Deva Vishnu Temple	Guwari		Seoni	22°33′02″N 79°44′34″E	Upload Photo
S-MP-249	Fort of Gadhkundhar	Kudar		Niwari	25°28′53″N 78°53′55″E	Fort of Gadhkundhar More images
S-MP-250	Surya Temple	Umri		Tikamgarh	24°30′25″N 78°57′44″E	Upload Photo
S-MP-251	Surya Temple	Madkhera		Tikamgarh	24°52′13″N 78°47′07″E	Surya Temple More images
S-MP-252	Shiva Temple	Badagaon		Tikamgarh	24°33′50″N 79°01′01″E	Upload Photo
S-MP-253	Gupteshwar Temple	Mohangarh Jatara		Tikamgarh		Upload Photo
S-MP-254	Jahangir Mahal	Orchha		Niwari	25°21′03″N 78°38′39″E	Jahangir Mahal More images
S-MP-255	Rajamahal	Orchha		Niwari	25°21′00″N 78°38′33″E	Rajamahal More images
S-MP-256	Lakshmi Temple	Orchha		Niwari	25°21′10″N 78°37′51″E	Lakshmi Temple More images
S-MP-257	Pravin Rai Mahal	Orchha		Niwari	25°21′06″N 78°38′42″E	Pravin Rai Mahal More images
S-MP-258	Chhatris on the bank of Betwa River	Orchha		Niwari	25°20′41″N 78°38′17″E	Chhatris on the bank of Betwa River More images
S-MP-259	Three Kothi's at the Back of Dauji ki Kothi	Orchha		Niwari	25°20′54″N 78°38′39″E	Three Kothi's at the Back of Dauji ki Kothi More images
S-MP-260	Pratham Purana Darwaza	Orchha		Niwari	25°22′02″N 78°38′37″E	Pratham Purana Darwaza More images
S-MP-261	Gundrai Darwaza	Orchha		Niwari	25°21′00″N 78°37′27″E	Upload Photo
S-MP-262	Purani Haveli	Orchha		Niwari	25°20′52″N 78°38′36″E	Upload Photo
S-MP-263	Palki Mahal	Orchha		Niwari	25°21′05″N 78°38′24″E	Upload Photo
S-MP-264	Shiva Temple (inside Fort)	Orchha		Niwari	25°21′17″N 78°38′44″E	Upload Photo
S-MP-265	Barudkhana	Orchha		Niwari	25°20′52″N 78°38′34″E	Upload Photo
S-MP-266	Siddhababa ki Gufa	Orchha		Niwari	25°21′20″N 78°38′51″E	Upload Photo
S-MP-267	Banavasi Mandir and Dharmashala	Orchha		Niwari	25°21′32″N 78°38′51″E	Banavasi Mandir and Dharmashala More images
S-MP-268	Ancient Shiva temple	Orchha		Niwari	25°21′17″N 78°38′44″E	Ancient Shiva temple More images
S-MP-269	Yagyashala	Orchha		Niwari	25°21′17″N 78°38′46″E	Upload Photo
S-MP-270	Teen Dasion Ki Chhatri	Orchha		Niwari	25°21′15″N 78°38′53″E	Teen Dasion Ki Chhatri More images
S-MP-271	Unthkhana	Orchha		Niwari	25°21′03″N 78°38′43″E	Unthkhana More images
S-MP-272	Raghuvanshamani	Orchha		Niwari	25°20′57″N 78°38′14″E	Upload Photo
S-MP-273	Harsiddhi Temple	Orchha		Niwari	25°21′29″N 78°38′38″E	Upload Photo
S-MP-274	Raiman Dau ki Kothi	Orchha		Niwari	25°20′57″N 78°38′39″E	Upload Photo
S-MP-275	Vallabha Temple	Orchha		Niwari	25°20′50″N 78°38′37″E	Upload Photo
S-MP-276	Purani Bavri	Orchha		Niwari	25°20′41″N 78°36′13″E	Purani Bavri More images
S-MP-277	Chaturbhurj Temple	Orchha		Niwari	25°21′00″N 78°38′24″E	Chaturbhurj Temple More images
S-MP-278	Purana Mandir	Orchha		Niwari		Purana Mandir
S-MP-279	Ancient Gaushala	Orchha		Niwari		Upload Photo
S-MP-280	Chhardwari Bawadi and Hanuman Temple	Orchha		Niwari	25°20′41″N 78°36′13″E	Upload Photo
S-MP-281	Sitamadhi	Orchha		Niwari	25°20′52″N 78°38′27″E	Upload Photo
S-MP-282	Kantila Darwaza	Orchha		Niwari	25°21′03″N 78°38′33″E	Kantila Darwaza More images
S-MP-283	Prachin Viran Mandir	Orchha		Niwari		Upload Photo
S-MP-284	Hamamkhana	Orchha		Niwari	25°21′05″N 78°38′44″E	Hamamkhana More images
S-MP-285	Shahi Darwaza	Orchha		Niwari	25°21′05″N 78°38′43″E	Shahi Darwaza More images
S-MP-286	Radhika Raman Temple	Orchha		Niwari	25°20′58″N 78°38′17″E	Radhika Raman Temple More images
S-MP-287	Two Ruins	Orchha		Niwari		Upload Photo
S-MP-288	Kalyanji ka Mandir	Orchha		Niwari	25°21′08″N 78°38′15″E	Upload Photo
S-MP-289	Phulbagh	Orchha		Niwari	25°21′06″N 78°38′24″E	Upload Photo
S-MP-290	Topkhana	Orchha		Niwari	25°21′03″N 78°38′34″E	Upload Photo
S-MP-291	Radhika Bihari Temple	Orchha		Niwari	25°21′29″N 78°38′50″E	Radhika Bihari Temple More images
S-MP-292	Panchmukhi Mahadeva Temple	Orchha		Niwari	25°21′20″N 78°38′49″E	Panchmukhi Mahadeva Temple More images
S-MP-293	Adawara Pul	Orchha		Niwari	25°21′03″N 78°38′32″E	Adawara Pul More images
S-MP-294	Sundarshah's Mahal	Orchha		Niwari	25°21′06″N 78°37′46″E	Upload Photo
S-MP-295	Naune Ju ki Haveli	Orchha		Niwari	25°21′44″N 78°38′24″E	Upload Photo
S-MP-296	Phasiyane ki Haveli	Orchha		Niwari	25°21′21″N 78°38′22″E	Upload Photo
S-MP-297	Jujhar Singh's Mahal	Orchha		Niwari	25°21′04″N 78°38′23″E	Jujhar Singh's Mahal More images
S-MP-298	Topchi ki Haveli	Orchha		Niwari	25°21′25″N 78°38′32″E	Upload Photo
S-MP-299	Gosain ka Math	Orchha		Niwari	25°21′12″N 78°38′22″E	Upload Photo
S-MP-300	Hathi Saav ka Mahal	Orchha		Niwari	25°20′51″N 78°38′25″E	Upload Photo
S-MP-301	Supari Saav ka Mahal	Orchha		Niwari	25°20′52″N 78°38′25″E	Upload Photo
S-MP-302	Bhagvantrao ki Haveli	Orchha		Niwari	25°20′58″N 78°38′25″E	Upload Photo
S-MP-303	Pandit Hariram ki Haveli	Orchha		Niwari	25°20′57″N 78°38′16″E	Upload Photo
S-MP-311	Vishwanath Temple	Karimati		Umaria	23°29′07″N 80°48′00″E	Vishwanath Temple More images
S-MP-312	Sagra Temple	Umaria		Umaria	23°31′51″N 80°49′29″E	Upload Photo
S-MP-390	Ancient Shiva Temple Dharhakala	Pushparajgarh		Anuppur	22°52′38″N 81°37′00″E	Upload Photo
S-MP-391	Vishvanatha Temple, Rohniya	Manpur		Anuppur	23°44′28″N 81°05′52″E	Upload Photo
S-MP-392	Akol Bawdi	Chanderi		Ashoknagar	24°42′28″N 78°08′01″E	Upload Photo
S-MP-393	Aniruddh singh ki Chhatri	Chanderi		Ashoknagar	24°43′05″N 78°08′06″E	Upload Photo
S-MP-394	AthaKhambha Dhubya Talab	Chanderi		Ashoknagar	24°42′13″N 78°07′53″E	Upload Photo
S-MP-395	Bahadur ju Durjan Singh ki Chhatri Parmeshwar Talab	Chanderi		Ashoknagar	24°43′04″N 78°08′03″E	Upload Photo
S-MP-396	Behati Math	Chanderi		Ashoknagar	24°36′38″N 78°12′05″E	Upload Photo
S-MP-397	Bharat Shah ki Chhatri,Parmeswara Taal	Chanderi		Ashoknagar	24°43′07″N 78°08′03″E	Upload Photo
S-MP-398	Chakle ki Khidki (Khari Bawdi)	Chanderi		Ashoknagar	24°42′34″N 78°08′13″E	Upload Photo
S-MP-399	Chandai Bawdi	Fatehabad, Chanderi		Ashoknagar	24°43′31″N 78°08′39″E	Upload Photo
S-MP-400	Chhatri Hauz Khas	Chanderi		Ashoknagar	24°43′01″N 78°07′55″E	Upload Photo
S-MP-401	Devi Singh ki Chhatri, Parmeswara Taal	Chanderi		Ashoknagar	24°43′05″N 78°08′01″E	Upload Photo
S-MP-402	Dilli Darvaja	Chanderi		Ashoknagar	24°43′00″N 78°08′14″E	Upload Photo
S-MP-403	Dholia Darwaza, Kot Saharpana	Chanderi		Ashoknagar	24°42′48″N 78°08′07″E	Upload Photo
S-MP-404	Ghachau Bawdi	Chanderi		Ashoknagar	24°43′13″N 78°09′27″E	Upload Photo
S-MP-405	Gol Bawdi Masjid	Chanderi		Ashoknagar	24°41′58″N 78°08′01″E	Upload Photo
S-MP-406	Hajira (Lal Bawdi) Sarai	Chanderi		Ashoknagar	24°42′35″N 78°07′56″E	Upload Photo
S-MP-407	Hanso ki Chhatri	Chanderi		Ashoknagar	24°42′39″N 78°08′30″E	Upload Photo
S-MP-408	Harkund ki Chhatri	Chanderi		Ashoknagar	24°42′25″N 78°07′51″E	Upload Photo
S-MP-409	Janajan Bawdi	Chanderi		Ashoknagar	24°43′05″N 78°09′51″E	Upload Photo
S-MP-410	Jhalare ke Mazar-1 & 2, Houz Khas	Chanderi		Ashoknagar		Upload Photo
S-MP-411	Jhalari Bawdi	Chanderi		Ashoknagar	24°43′19″N 78°09′29″E	Upload Photo
S-MP-412	Kaji Bawdi	Chanderi		Ashoknagar	24°43′28″N 78°07′53″E	Upload Photo
S-MP-413	Kaji Makbara, Idgah	Chanderi		Ashoknagar	24°43′18″N 78°07′47″E	Upload Photo
S-MP-414	Kale Saiyad ka Makbara, Kala Pahad	Chanderi		Ashoknagar		Upload Photo
S-MP-415	Khilji Sarai Darwaja	Chanderi		Ashoknagar	24°43′38″N 78°08′10″E	Upload Photo
S-MP-416	Madarasa Darwaja, Mela Ground	Chanderi		Ashoknagar	24°43′15″N 78°07′53″E	Upload Photo
S-MP-417	Makbara Group, Takiya Kala Pahad	Chanderi		Ashoknagar		Upload Photo
S-MP-418	Musa Bawdi	Chanderi		Ashoknagar	24°42′52″N 78°08′20″E	Upload Photo
S-MP-419	Narasingh Temple	Chanderi		Ashoknagar	24°42′42″N 78°08′20″E	Upload Photo
S-MP-420	Pachmarhi Bawdi Masjid	Chanderi		Ashoknagar	24°43′18″N 78°08′08″E	Upload Photo
S-MP-421	Pandey Bawdi	Chanderi		Ashoknagar	24°43′12″N 78°08′43″E	Upload Photo
S-MP-422	Purani Adalat-Kachahari	Chanderi		Ashoknagar	24°42′35″N 78°08′14″E	Upload Photo
S-MP-423	Sagar Chhatri, Jageshwri Temple	Chanderi		Ashoknagar	24°42′41″N 78°08′37″E	Upload Photo
S-MP-424	Sati Chhatris	Chanderi		Ashoknagar	24°43′07″N 78°07′57″E	Upload Photo
S-MP-425	Shaikhon Ka Makbara	Chanderi		Ashoknagar	24°43′36″N 78°08′18″E	Upload Photo
S-MP-426	Sufi Darwaja	Chanderi		Ashoknagar	24°42′46″N 78°08′14″E	Upload Photo
S-MP-427	Sufi Makbra, Khankah Dargah, Shah Vilayat Complex	Chanderi		Ashoknagar	24°43′01″N 78°08′05″E	Upload Photo
S-MP-428	Sufi Sant ka Makbara, Dhubya Talab	Chanderi		Ashoknagar	24°42′18″N 78°08′02″E	Upload Photo
S-MP-429	Tamere ki Chhatri, Khasiyon ki Talaiya	Chanderi		Ashoknagar	24°42′31″N 78°07′53″E	Upload Photo
S-MP-430	Tapa Bawdi	Chanderi		Ashoknagar	24°42′46″N 78°08′37″E	Upload Photo
S-MP-431	Untsar	Chanderi		Ashoknagar	24°42′38″N 78°08′15″E	Upload Photo
S-MP-432	Aaliya Bawdi	Fatehabad Chanderi		Ashoknagar	24°42′07″N 78°06′50″E	Upload Photo
S-MP-433	Aaliya Masjid	Fatehabad Chanderi		Ashoknagar	24°42′09″N 78°06′48″E	Upload Photo
S-MP-434	Kurbani Chabutra	Fatehabad Chanderi		Ashoknagar	24°42′20″N 78°07′06″E	Upload Photo
S-MP-435	Lalpir	Fatehabad Chanderi		Ashoknagar		Upload Photo
S-MP-436	Sultania Masjid	Fatehabad Chanderi		Ashoknagar	24°41′47″N 78°06′44″E	Upload Photo
S-MP-437	Machla Bawdi Halanpur	Singhpurchalda		Ashoknagar		Upload Photo
S-MP-438	Chhoti Battisi Bawdi	Pranpur, Chanderi		Ashoknagar	24°43′25″N 78°09′26″E	Upload Photo
S-MP-439	Phooti Bawdi	Fatehabad, Chanderi		Ashoknagar	24°42′08″N 78°06′45″E	Upload Photo
S-MP-440	Rock-Shelters with Painting, Likhi Dant	Nanon, Chanderi		Ashoknagar	24°37′15″N 78°00′22″E	Upload Photo
S-MP-441	Raja Bawdi	Royal Palace Chanderi		Ashoknagar	24°42′47″N 78°08′18″E	Upload Photo
S-MP-442	Rajmati Bawdi	Singhpurchalda, Chanderi		Ashoknagar	24°41′11″N 78°06′26″E	Upload Photo
S-MP-443	Old Gosai Temple (Shiva Temple), Dhansua	Dhansua		Balaghat	21°51′12″N 80°16′01″E	Upload Photo
S-MP-444	Baradari and Park (Palace) Ghinochi	Ater		Bhind		Upload Photo
S-MP-445	Baradari Roun	Indurkhi		Bhind	26°20′47″N 78°52′15″E	Upload Photo
S-MP-446	Birkhadi Gate, Gohad	Gohad		Bhind	26°25′37″N 78°26′58″E	Upload Photo
S-MP-447	Itayali Gateway, Gohad	Gohad		Bhind	26°25′19″N 78°26′34″E	Upload Photo
S-MP-448	Kharoua Gate, Gohad	Gohad		Bhind	26°25′16″N 78°26′48″E	Upload Photo
S-MP-449	Surya Mandir	Chhatarpur		Chhatarpur	24°59′57″N 79°29′14″E	Upload Photo
S-MP-450	Chousath Yogini Mandir	Mau, Nowgaon		Chhatarpur		Upload Photo
S-MP-451	Hriday Shah Palace, Mau	Mau, Nowgaon		Chhatarpur	25°00′30″N 79°28′51″E	Upload Photo
S-MP-452	Badal Mahal, Maheba	Maheba		Chhatarpur	24°59′51″N 79°28′21″E	Upload Photo
S-MP-453	Shital Garhi, Maheba	Maheba		Chhatarpur	24°59′47″N 79°28′41″E	Upload Photo
S-MP-454	Bawdi, Chakchandaiya	Datia		Datia	25°41′29″N 78°32′18″E	Upload Photo
S-MP-455	Bawdi, Inside Hospital	Datia		Datia	25°41′17″N 78°26′30″E	Upload Photo
S-MP-456	Bawdi, Siroli	Datia		Datia	25°42′56″N 78°27′36″E	Upload Photo
S-MP-457	Beti Kunja Devi Temple, Indargarh, Charoa	Datia		Datia	25°54′46″N 78°31′10″E	Upload Photo
S-MP-458	Chhatri of Maharani Shahkarna	Datia		Datia	25°40′14″N 78°28′10″E	Upload Photo
S-MP-459	Ruins of Fort	Ramgarh		Dindori	22°48′01″N 80°57′31″E	Upload Photo
						Upload Photo
S-MP-460	Fort of Bajranggarh	Bajranggarh		Guna		Upload Photo
S-MP-461	Palace of Soubat	Bajranggarh		Guna		Upload Photo
S-MP-462	Fort and Temple, Chachoda	Chachoda		Guna		Upload Photo
S-MP-463	Garhi Baihat	Baihat		Gwalior		Upload Photo
S-MP-464	Jhilmileshwar Mahadeva Temple, Tansen Site	Baihat		Gwalior		Upload Photo
S-MP-465	Devgarh Fort, Dbara	Dbara		Gwalior		Upload Photo
S-MP-466	Fortress Lohgarh	Dbara		Gwalior		Upload Photo
S-MP-467	Famous Ancient Fortress, Salwai	Dbara		Gwalior		Upload Photo
S-MP-468	Royal Hotal Banlow	Jabalpur		Jabalpur		Upload Photo
S-MP-469	Badshah Halvai Mandir Polipothar	Polipothar		Jabalpur		Upload Photo
S-MP-470	Prachin Bavdi, Sihora	Sihora		Jabalpur		Upload Photo
S-MP-471	Radha-krishna Mandir, Lamheta	Lamheta		Jabalpur		Upload Photo
S-MP-472	Group of Temple near Govt. School	Katni		Katni		Upload Photo
S-MP-473	Chhatri near Tapsi Math No. 1,2,3	Bilhri, Rithi		Katni		Upload Photo
S-MP-474	Kam Kandla Temple	Bilhri, Rithi		Katni		Upload Photo
S-MP-475	Ruins, located in Police Thana complex	Bilhri, Rithi		Katni		Upload Photo
S-MP-476	Shiva Temple, Near in Police Thana	Bilhri, Rithi		Katni		Upload Photo
S-MP-477	Temple near Chhatri	Bilhri, Rithi		Katni		Upload Photo
S-MP-478	Temple near River	Bilhri, Rithi		Katni		Upload Photo
S-MP-479	Makbara, Bichhiya	Bichhiya		Mandla		Upload Photo
S-MP-480	Noorabad Ka Pool	Noorabad		Morena		Upload Photo
S-MP-483	Rock Art Chhaj	Karsa		Morena		Upload Photo
S-MP-484	Narsingh Temple	Narsinghpur		Narsinghpur		Upload Photo
S-MP-485	Shri Garur Dev Temple, Gararu	Gararu		Narsinghpur		Upload Photo
S-MP-486	Shiva Temple, Gararu	Gararu		Narsinghpur		Upload Photo
S-MP-487	Raj Mahal of Old Gond Period	Pithara		Narsinghpur		Upload Photo
S-MP-488	Shanti memorial Library, Kandeli	Kandeli		Narsinghpur		Upload Photo
S-MP-489	Ram Nagar Darvaja	Orchha		Niwari		Upload Photo
S-MP-490	Sefti Wall, Orchha	Orchha		Niwari		Upload Photo
S-MP-491	Cenotaph of Hridayashah	Panna		Panna		Upload Photo
S-MP-492	Cenotaph of Hridayshah’s Queen	Panna		Panna		Upload Photo
S-MP-493	Cenotaph of Kishore Singh	Panna		Panna		Upload Photo
S-MP-494	Cenotaph of Kishore Singh’s Wife	Panna		Panna		Upload Photo
S-MP-495	Cenotaph of Mirza Raja	Panna		Panna		Upload Photo
S-MP-496	Cenotaph No. 1 of Chhatrasal Park	Panna		Panna		Upload Photo
S-MP-497	Cenotaph No. 2 of Chhatrasal Park	Panna		Panna		Upload Photo
S-MP-498	Lukeshwar Nath Temple, Jawa	Jawa		Rewa		Upload Photo
S-MP-499	Painted Rock Shelter	Gaddi		Rewa		Upload Photo
S-MP-500	Shiv Mandir Baijnath	Baijnath		Rewa		Upload Photo
S-MP-501	Yogini Mata, Sirmor	Sirmor		Rewa		Upload Photo
S-MP-502	Ancient Fort	Malthon		Sagar		Upload Photo
S-MP-503	Ancient Fort on the Bank of Sunari River	Rahli		Sagar		Upload Photo
S-MP-504	Ancient Fort	Ata		Sagar		Upload Photo
S-MP-505	Ancient Fortress, Kharvahi	Kharvahi		Satna		Upload Photo
S-MP-506	Ancient Temple Remains of Yagnavedi Site, Sarbhanga	Sarbhanga		Satna		Upload Photo
S-MP-507	Rock-cut Ganesh Image and Temple and Cenotaph near Brahamkund	Sarbhanga		Satna		Upload Photo
S-MP-508	Hanuman Temple of Mahavir Pahari	Sarbhanga		Satna		Upload Photo
S-MP-509	Ancient Shiv Temple behind Vraddhashram	Sarbhanga		Satna		Upload Photo
S-MP-510	Rock-cut Chamunda of Sanwar Pahari (in Minning area)	Sarbhanga		Satna		Upload Photo
S-MP-511	Group of Temple, Prachin Vishnu Mandir	Uchehra		Satna		Upload Photo
S-MP-512	Remains of Ancient Image, Umariha	Umariha		Satna		Upload Photo
S-MP-513	Shiv Mandir, Madai	Maihar		Satna		Upload Photo
S-MP-514	Shiva Mandir, Kachhar, Machhar	Raghurajnagar		Satna		Upload Photo
S-MP-515	Shiva Temple & 13 Cave	Lakhbariya		Shahdol		Upload Photo
S-MP-516	Kothi No.17	Shivpuri		Shivpuri		Upload Photo
S-MP-517	Tatiya Tope Smarak Park	Shivpuri		Shivpuri		Upload Photo
S-MP-518	Ancient Temple and Sculpture	Kudalpur		Shivpuri		Upload Photo
S-MP-519	Dharm Talaiya	Kachhoa		Shivpuri		Upload Photo
S-MP-520	Prachin Gadhi	Kachhoa		Shivpuri		Upload Photo
S-MP-521	Fort of Pichhor	Pichhor		Shivpuri		Upload Photo
S-MP-522	Fort, Karaira	Karaira		Shivpuri		Upload Photo
S-MP-523	Jain Temple and Ancient Sculpture, Budirai	Kolaras		Shivpuri		Upload Photo
S-MP-524	Kuthiya Math (Bouddh Math), Rajpur	Rajpur, Pichhor		Shivpuri		Upload Photo
S-MP-525	Vishnu Temple, Shankar ki Madia	Khaniadhana		Shivpuri		Upload Photo
S-MP-526	Shiva Temple Ancient Matha	Bilokalan		Shivpuri		Upload Photo
S-MP-527	Surya Temple	Khyavadakalan		Shivpuri		Upload Photo
S-MP-528	Jaljalia Chhewari	Singrauli		Singrauli		Upload Photo
S-MP-529	Fort, Baldevgarh	Baldevgarh		Tikamgarh		Upload Photo
S-MP-530	Fort Astone	Astone		Tikamgarh		Upload Photo
S-MP-531	Sitamadhi, Madi	Pali		Umaria		Upload Photo
S-MP-532	Ancient Fortress	Singhpur		Umaria		Upload Photo
S-MP-533	Vishwanath Temple (Jwalamukhi)	Rohnia		Umaria		Upload Photo

NOTE: For all the Monuments whose coordinates are listed above; Images posted by visitors are available on Google Map.

== See also ==
- List of State Protected Monuments in India for other State Protected Monuments in India
- List of Monuments of National Importance in Madhya Pradesh
- Other Historic Heritage sites of Madhya Pradesh
