= Samasgarh =

Shamsgarh
- village
- Location within Madhya Pradesh Location within India
- Coordinates: 23.1208817°N 77.3295708°E
- Country: India
- State: Madhya Pradesh
- District: Bhopal
- Tehsil: Huzur
- Elevation: 552 m (1,811 ft)

Population (2011)
  - Total: 387
- Time zone: UTC+5:30 (IST)
- ISO 3166 code: MP-IN
- 2011 census code: 482525

Shamsgarh is a village in the Bhopal district of Madhya Pradesh, India. It is located in the Huzur tehsil and the Phanda block.

The village is home to an ancient Jain temple and a shiva temple. The Shiva temple and two step wells were declared as state-protected monuments in 2012. The idols in this temple have been dated to 11th century.

== Demographics ==
According to the 2011 census of India, Samasgarh has 72 households. The effective literacy rate (i.e. the literacy rate of population excluding children aged 6 and below) is 64.56%.

Demographics (2011 Census)
	Total	Male	Female
Population	387	200	187
Children aged below 6 years	54	26	28
Scheduled caste	62	36	26
Scheduled tribe	212	104	108
Literates	215	128	87
Workers (all)	199	108	91
Main workers (total)	124	79	45
Main workers: Cultivators	31	20	11
Main workers: Agricultural labourers	72	42	30
Main workers: Household industry workers	0	0	0
Main workers: Other	21	17	4
Marginal workers (total)	75	29	46
Marginal workers: Cultivators	6	2	4
Marginal workers: Agricultural labourers	57	19	38
Marginal workers: Household industry workers	0	0	0
Marginal workers: Others	12	8	4
Non-workers	188	92	96
