= List of State Protected Monuments in Madhya Pradesh/ Central & West Zone =

The Government of Madhya Pradesh, through the Directorate of Archaeology, Archives and Museums, has added, deleted, and reorganised the monuments under four zones: Bhopal Zone, Gwalior Zone, Indore Zone, and Jabalpur Zone. The Districts of Madhya Pradesh are listed under these zones. The Monuments of each district are listed on a page with a short description and an image. 515 State Protected Monuments of Madhya Pradesh are listed in this format.

The Central zone has following Districts :

- Betul, Bhopal, Harda, Narmadapuram, Raisen, Rajgarh, Sehore and Vidisha

The West zone has following Districts :

- Agar Malwa, Alirajpur, Barwani, Burhanpur, Dewas, Dhar, Indore, Jhabua, Khandwa, Khargone, Mandsaur, Neemuch, Ratlam, Shajapur and Ujjain

The other State Protected Monuments are at List of State Protected Monuments in Madhya Pradesh/ East & North Zone.

Besides the State Protected Monuments, the Monuments of National Importance in this state has primary sites.

== List of state protected monuments ==
SL. No.	Description	Location	Address	District	Coordinates	Image
S-MP-1	Fort Sendhwa	Sendhwa		Barwani	21°41′19″N 75°05′44″E	Fort Sendhwa More images
S-MP-2	Ancient Bavdi	Jalgone		Barwani	21°40′47″N 74°43′05″E	Upload Photo
S-MP-4	Ancient Shiva Temple	Bhainsdehi		Betul	21°38′58″N 77°38′07″E	Ancient Shiva Temple More images
S-MP-5	Digambar Jaina Temple, Cave No. 10	Muktagiri		Betul	21°24′04″N 77°34′23″E	Digambar Jaina Temple, Cave No. 10 More images
S-MP-6	Pandava ki Kacheri (Shiva Temple)	Salbardi		Betul	21°25′32″N 78°00′38″E	Upload Photo
S-MP-7	Rishi Baba and Mata Mai ka Mandir	Dohlan		Betul	21°41′05″N 78°05′35″E	Upload Photo
S-MP-27	Chaman Mahal	Islamnagar, Bhopal		Bhopal	23°21′28″N 77°25′04″E	Chaman Mahal More images
S-MP-28	Rani Mahal	Islamnagar, Bhopal		Bhopal	23°21′28″N 77°25′04″E	Rani Mahal More images
S-MP-29	Gond Mahal	Islamnagar, Bhopal		Bhopal	23°21′25″N 77°24′56″E	Gond Mahal More images
S-MP-30	Fort Wall	Islamnagar, Bhopal		Bhopal	23°21′21″N 77°25′01″E	Fort Wall More images
S-MP-31	Taj Mahal Palace	Bhopal		Bhopal	23°16′01″N 77°23′33″E	Taj Mahal Palace More images
S-MP-32	Golghar Museum	Bhopal		Bhopal	23°16′05″N 77°23′25″E	Golghar Museum More images
S-MP-33	Mausoleum of Dost Khan and Fateh Bibi	Bhopal		Bhopal	23°15′33″N 77°23′28″E	Mausoleum of Dost Khan and Fateh Bibi More images
S-MP-34	Akbari Sarai	Burhanpur		Burhanpur	21°18′39″N 76°14′04″E	Upload Photo
S-MP-35	Rao Ratan Mahal	Ratanpura		Burhanpur	21°17′18″N 76°12′21″E	Upload Photo
S-MP-36	Zainabad Sarai and Masjid	Zainabad		Burhanpur	21°18′08″N 76°14′40″E	Upload Photo
S-MP-37	Baradari	Burhanpur		Burhanpur	21°17′24″N 76°13′24″E	Upload Photo
S-MP-38	Tomb of Begum Mumtaz Mahal	Ahukhana		Burhanpur	21°18′48″N 76°14′37″E	Upload Photo
S-MP-39	Mausoleum of Sahzada Parvez	Burhanpur		Burhanpur	21°18′52″N 76°13′22″E	Upload Photo
S-MP-40	Mausoleum of Daulat Khan Lodhi	Burhanpur		Burhanpur	21°19′38″N 76°13′31″E	Upload Photo
S-MP-41	Moti Mahal	Asirgarh		Burhanpur	21°28′48″N 76°16′47″E	Upload Photo
S-MP-78	Shiva Temple	Jamli		Dhar	22°28′52″N 74°58′52″E	Upload Photo
S-MP-79	Dhar Durg	Dhar		Dhar	22°36′04″N 75°18′15″E	Dhar Durg More images
S-MP-80	Kharbuja Mahal	Dhar		Dhar	22°36′08″N 75°18′11″E	Kharbuja Mahal More images
S-MP-81	Koteshwar Temple	Nagjhiri		Dhar	22°54′39″N 75°09′13″E	Upload Photo
S-MP-82	Baijnath Temple	Badnawar		Dhar	23°01′17″N 75°14′18″E	Baijnath Temple More images
S-MP-83	Chappan Mahal	Mandu		Dhar	22°20′34″N 75°23′52″E	Chappan Mahal More images
S-MP-84	Chaturbhurj Temple	Amjhera		Dhar	22°33′33″N 75°06′53″E	Upload Photo
S-MP-85	Malcolm Kothi	Nalchha		Dhar	22°25′48″N 75°24′13″E	Upload Photo
S-MP-86	Andha Mahal	Sulibardi		Dhar	22°21′51″N 75°23′17″E	Andha Mahal More images
S-MP-87	Madankui Sarai	Mandu		Dhar	22°21′18″N 75°23′47″E	Upload Photo
S-MP-88	Kothari Sarai	Mandu		Dhar	22°20′22″N 75°23′59″E	Kothari Sarai More images
S-MP-89	Roja ka Makbara	Mandu		Dhar	22°20′08″N 75°23′57″E	Roja ka Makbara More images
S-MP-90	Phuta Mandir (Broken)	Mandu		Dhar	22°21′16″N 75°23′48″E	Upload Photo
S-MP-105	Chhatri	Barakhad kalan, Seoni Malwa		Narmadapuram		Upload Photo
S-MP-106	Teli ki Sarai	Handia		Harda	22°28′18″N 76°58′49″E	Teli ki Sarai More images
S-MP-107	Riddheshwar Mahadev Temple	Handia		Harda	22°29′12″N 76°58′36″E	Riddheshwar Mahadev Temple More images
S-MP-108	Chhatri of Boliya Sarkar	Indore		Indore	22°43′10″N 75°51′35″E	Chhatri of Boliya Sarkar More images
S-MP-109	Chhatri of Krishnabai Holkar	Indore		Indore	22°43′08″N 75°51′29″E	Chhatri of Krishnabai Holkar More images
S-MP-110	Rajwada Mahal, Chauk, Image of Ahilyabai and garden	Indore		Indore	22°43′06″N 75°51′19″E	Rajwada Mahal, Chauk, Image of Ahilyabai and garden More images
S-MP-111	Lalbagh Palace	Indore		Indore	22°42′00″N 75°50′50″E	Lalbagh Palace More images
S-MP-112	Fort of Kushalgadh	Kushalgadh		Indore	22°28′05″N 75°50′15″E	Upload Photo
S-MP-122	Panchlingeshwar Shiva Temple	Malwai		Alirajpur	22°15′55″N 74°20′52″E	Upload Photo
S-MP-123	Shiva Temple	Devalphalia		Jhabua	22°36′13″N 74°27′03″E	Upload Photo
S-MP-124	Bawadi Hanuman Temple	Thandala		Jhabua	23°00′23″N 74°34′43″E	Upload Photo
S-MP-129	Gauri Somnath Temple	Omkareshwar		Khandwa	22°15′01″N 76°08′53″E	Gauri Somnath Temple More images
S-MP-130	Siddheshwar Temple	Omkareshwar		Khandwa	22°14′47″N 76°09′06″E	Upload Photo
S-MP-131	Parvati Temple	Omkareshwar		Khandwa		Upload Photo
S-MP-132	Ballaleshwar Temple	Un		Khargone	21°49′26″N 75°27′03″E	Ballaleshwar Temple More images
S-MP-140	Varaha Temple	Kohala		Mandsaur	24°32′03″N 75°39′05″E	Upload Photo
S-MP-141	Group of rock cut cave temples	Pola Dungar Kharkheda		Mandsaur	24°14′59″N 75°45′21″E	Upload Photo
S-MP-142	Thakur Chaman Singh ki Gadhi	Acheri		Mandsaur	24°01′40″N 74°59′24″E	Upload Photo
S-MP-143	Yashwant Rao Holkar Chhatri	Bhanpura		Mandsaur	24°31′02″N 75°44′19″E	Yashwant Rao Holkar Chhatri More images
S-MP-144	Lakshmi Narain Temple	Neemthur		Mandsaur	24°31′39″N 75°48′24″E	Upload Photo
S-MP-145	Dudheshwar Mahadeva Temple	Chirmoliya		Mandsaur	24°01′14″N 75°15′19″E	Upload Photo
S-MP-146	Ancient Caves and Temples	Khejdiyabhop		Mandsaur	23°59′33″N 75°43′54″E	Upload Photo
S-MP-147	Suraj Temple	Khilchipura		Mandsaur	24°02′37″N 75°04′18″E	Upload Photo
S-MP-148	Toran Barda	Ghasoi		Mandsaur		Upload Photo
S-MP-149	Hingalajgadh Durg	Hinglajgarh		Mandsaur	24°40′02″N 75°47′12″E	Hingalajgadh Durg More images
S-MP-167	Fort and Jogeshwar Bhagwan Temple	Sangwan		Harda	22°04′02″N 76°56′22″E	Upload Photo
S-MP-168	Tilak Sindoor Temple	Khatama		Narmadapuram	22°29′30″N 77°43′40″E	Upload Photo
S-MP-169	Ancient Temple	Khor		Neemuch	24°35′26″N 74°48′51″E	Upload Photo
S-MP-170	Panchdeval	Jiran		Neemuch	24°18′05″N 74°53′15″E	Upload Photo
S-MP-171	Mandir	Jiran		Neemuch	24°18′05″N 74°53′14″E	Upload Photo
S-MP-172	Jiran Ki Gadhi	Jiran		Neemuch	24°18′28″N 74°53′21″E	Jiran Ki Gadhi
S-MP-173	Chhatri of Bhanu Tikait	Jiran		Neemuch	24°18′06″N 74°53′14″E	Upload Photo
S-MP-174	Shiva Temple	Jiran		Neemuch	24°17′59″N 74°53′15″E	Upload Photo
S-MP-175	Temple of Dhava Mata	Nayagaon		Neemuch	24°34′11″N 74°46′36″E	Upload Photo
S-MP-176	Ancient Temple-2	Barukheda		Neemuch	24°29′18″N 74°53′30″E	Upload Photo
S-MP-177	Ancient Temple-4	Barukheda		Neemuch	24°29′34″N 74°53′25″E	Upload Photo
S-MP-178	Ancient Temple-1	Barukheda		Neemuch	24°29′14″N 74°53′27″E	Upload Photo
S-MP-183	Solah Khambi	Bihar Village		Rajgarh	23°37′32″N 77°06′16″E	Solah Khambi More images
S-MP-184	Mausoleum of Hajiwali	Bihar Village		Rajgarh	23°37′30″N 77°06′15″E	Upload Photo
S-MP-185	Ancient Mosque	Bihar Village		Rajgarh	23°37′28″N 77°05′57″E	Upload Photo
S-MP-186	Chhatri of Sankanji	Sanka Jagir		Rajgarh	23°35′57″N 77°07′32″E	Chhatri of Sankanji
S-MP-187	Ancient Bavdi	Machalpur		Rajgarh	24°07′33″N 76°18′45″E	Upload Photo
S-MP-188	Paniharin Temple	Machalpur		Rajgarh	24°07′32″N 76°19′32″E	Upload Photo
S-MP-189	Grave of Rani Rupmati and Baz Bahadur	Sarangpur		Rajgarh	23°33′54″N 76°29′10″E	Upload Photo
S-MP-190	Ruins of Jaina Temple and Images	Ashapuri		Raisen	23°04′22″N 77°37′20″E	Upload Photo
S-MP-191	Image of Goh (Mongoose?) and other images collected from the lower reach of the village	Ashapuri		Raisen	23°04′26″N 77°37′26″E	Upload Photo
S-MP-192	Ashadevi Temple	Ashapuri		Raisen	23°04′47″N 77°37′38″E	Ashadevi Temple
S-MP-193	Temple Ruins at Bilauta	Bilauta		Raisen	23°04′12″N 77°37′14″E	Upload Photo
S-MP-194	Temple ruins on top of hill	Ashapuri		Raisen	23°04′49″N 77°37′50″E	Upload Photo
S-MP-195	Bhutnath temple and Images	Ashapuri		Raisen	23°04′47″N 77°37′38″E	Bhutnath temple and Images More images
S-MP-196	Bilpakeshwar Temple	Bilpank		Ratlam	23°13′31″N 75°08′47″E	Bilpakeshwar Temple More images
S-MP-197	Mahakala Temple	Dharad		Ratlam	23°15′06″N 75°06′37″E	Upload Photo
S-MP-224	Jain Temple	Jamner		Shajapur	23°19′24″N 76°45′16″E	Upload Photo
S-MP-225	Chhatri of Ranoji Shinde	Ranoganj		Shajapur	23°23′57″N 76°41′03″E	Upload Photo
S-MP-226	Ram Temple	Bija Nagri		Shajapur	23°52′11″N 75°55′15″E	Upload Photo
S-MP-227	Karakraji Maharaja Temple	Lohariya, Susner		Shajapur		Upload Photo
S-MP-228	Shivaram Temple	Dongargaon, Susner		Shajapur		Upload Photo
S-MP-229	Harsiddhi Devi Temple	Bija Nagri		Shajapur	23°51′21″N 75°55′52″E	Upload Photo
S-MP-230	Varaha Temple	Barai		Shajapur	24°17′25″N 76°11′48″E	Upload Photo
S-MP-231	Ancient Temple (Siddheshwar Mahadeva Temple)	Awantipur		Shajapur	23°08′24″N 76°35′13″E	Upload Photo
S-MP-304	Chhatri of Durgadas	Ujjain		Ujjain	23°11′39″N 75°45′51″E	Chhatri of Durgadas More images
S-MP-305	Vishnu Chatushtika	Ujjain		Ujjain	23°12′30″N 75°46′19″E	Vishnu Chatushtika More images
S-MP-306	Chaubis Khamba	Ujjain		Ujjain	23°11′03″N 75°46′15″E	Chaubis Khamba More images
S-MP-307	Chamunda Temple	Ujjain		Ujjain	23°11′00″N 75°46′57″E	Chamunda Temple More images
S-MP-308	Kalka Mata Temple	Ujjain		Ujjain	23°12′30″N 75°46′13″E	Kalka Mata Temple More images
S-MP-309	Tilakeshwar Mahadeva Temple	Ujjain		Ujjain	23°11′57″N 75°46′10″E	Tilakeshwar Mahadeva Temple More images
S-MP-310	Ramjanardan Temple	Ujjain		Ujjain	23°12′36″N 75°46′44″E	Ramjanardan Temple More images
S-MP-313	Lohangi Hill, First gate, Second Gate, Solah Khambi, Mausoleum of Lohangi Peer, Inscribed Pillar Mandap, Pillared Ruins, Dharmashala and Protected area	Vidisha		Vidisha	23°31′36″N 77°48′51″E	Lohangi Hill, First gate, Second Gate, Solah Khambi, Mausoleum of Lohangi Peer, Inscribed Pillar Mandap, Pillared Ruins, Dharmashala and Protected area More images
S-MP-314	Pisanhari Temple, Shiva Temple	Udaypur		Vidisha	23°53′57″N 78°03′35″E	Upload Photo
S-MP-315	Shahi Masjid	Udaypur		Vidisha	23°54′01″N 78°03′34″E	Shahi Masjid
S-MP-316	Moti Masjid	Udaypur		Vidisha	23°54′02″N 78°03′42″E	Upload Photo
S-MP-317	Ravana Tol- Collosal Nataraj Murti	Udaypur		Vidisha	23°53′17″N 78°03′15″E	Upload Photo
S-MP-318	Mangladevi Temple	Kagpur		Vidisha	23°44′52″N 77°48′05″E	Upload Photo
S-MP-319	Kherapati Temple	Kagpur		Vidisha	23°45′01″N 77°48′10″E	Upload Photo
S-MP-320	Solah Khambi	Badoh		Vidisha	23°55′22″N 78°13′25″E	Upload Photo
S-MP-321	Satmadhi	Badoh		Vidisha	23°55′46″N 78°13′54″E	Satmadhi More images
S-MP-322	Kutkeshwar Temple	Badoh		Vidisha	23°56′08″N 78°13′41″E	Kutkeshwar Temple More images
S-MP-323	Deval Ghat Shiva Temple	Badoh		Vidisha	23°56′19″N 78°13′32″E	Upload Photo
S-MP-324	Haji ali ki Dargah	Vidisha		Vidisha	23°30′56″N 77°48′58″E	Upload Photo
S-MP-325	Chhoti Madagan (Neelkantheshwar Temple)	Lateri		Vidisha	24°03′13″N 77°24′14″E	Upload Photo
S-MP-326	Kaladeva (Kalyanrao Temple)	Lateri		Vidisha	24°03′41″N 77°23′47″E	Upload Photo
S-MP-327	Shree Sitaram Baba Ka Mandir	Salbardi		Betul	21°25′26″N 78°00′29″E	Upload Photo
S-MP-328	Moti Mahal	Bhopal		Bhopal	23°15′23″N 77°23′50″E	Moti Mahal More images
S-MP-329	Sadar Manzil, Darbar Hall, Bhopal	Bhopal		Bhopal	23°15′25″N 77°23′49″E	Upload Photo
S-MP-330	Chattri of Khushvant Rai Saxena and Baoli	Aishbag, Bhopal		Bhopal	23°15′42″N 77°25′17″E	Upload Photo
S-MP-331	Maulana Azad Central Library, Ajayabghar	Huzur, Bhopal		Bhopal	23°15′30″N 77°24′32″E	Upload Photo
S-MP-332	Remains of Shiva temple and Baodi	Samasgarh, Bhopal		Bhopal	23°07′28″N 77°19′58″E	Upload Photo
S-MP-333	Kundi Bhandara (Khooni Bhandara)	Burhanpur		Burhanpur	21°20′16″N 76°10′56″E	Kundi Bhandara (Khooni Bhandara) More images
S-MP-334	Chhatriyan of King Udaji Pawar	Dhar		Dhar	22°35′57″N 75°17′47″E	Chhatriyan of King Udaji Pawar More images
S-MP-335	Nagaria Mahal & Masjid Sagar Talab	Mandu		Dhar	22°19′33″N 75°23′45″E	Upload Photo
S-MP-336	Adar Gumbad Mahal	Mandu		Dhar	22°19′41″N 75°24′05″E	Upload Photo
S-MP-337	Bodia Mahal	Mandu		Dhar	22°20′36″N 75°24′24″E	Upload Photo
S-MP-338	Dakaniya Mahal, Jamania	Mandu		Dhar	22°18′54″N 75°24′52″E	Upload Photo
S-MP-339	Jamaniya Mahal	Mandu		Dhar	22°19′12″N 75°25′00″E	Upload Photo
S-MP-340	Roshan Bagh Mahal	Mandu		Dhar	22°20′58″N 75°25′32″E	Upload Photo
S-MP-341	Sumrawala Mahal	Mandu		Dhar	22°18′59″N 75°24′54″E	Upload Photo
S-MP-342	Ancient Fort and Saray	Lunera, Dhar		Dhar	22°25′07″N 75°29′26″E	Upload Photo
S-MP-343	Andhi Mahal	Suli Bardi		Dhar	22°21′55″N 75°23′17″E	Upload Photo
S-MP-344	Shaheed Bakhtawar Singh Smarak & Garhi	Amjhera		Dhar	22°33′33″N 75°07′14″E	Upload Photo
S-MP-345	Pir ki Dargah	Handiya, Harda		Harda	22°28′18″N 76°59′01″E	Upload Photo
S-MP-346	Part of Old Fort, Jumerati	Narmadapuram		Narmadapuram	22°45′52″N 77°42′44″E	Part of Old Fort, Jumerati More images
S-MP-347	Rock Art Site, Bawadi Harrapal-1	Game Range, Bori		Narmadapuram	22°24′11″N 78°04′48″E	Upload Photo
S-MP-348	Rock Art Site, Bawdi Harrapal-2	Game Range, Bori		Narmadapuram	22°24′11″N 78°04′48″E	Upload Photo
S-MP-349	Rock Art Site, Tasveer Pahadi, Harrapal	Game Range, Bori		Narmadapuram	22°24′11″N 78°04′48″E	Upload Photo
S-MP-350	Rock Art Site, Bhubhuri Lane, Badkachhar	Park Range, Pachmadhi		Narmadapuram	22°28′06″N 78°26′28″E	Upload Photo
S-MP-351	Rock Art Site, Nijangarh Kajri	Park Range, Pachmadhi		Narmadapuram	22°28′06″N 78°26′28″E	Upload Photo
S-MP-352	Rock Art Site, Churnagundi	Park Range Kamti		Narmadapuram	22°36′10″N 78°08′52″E	Upload Photo
S-MP-353	Shrimant Maharaja Savai Yashvant Holkar II Chhatri	Indore		Indore		Upload Photo
S-MP-354	Bavdi no. 1&2, (Step Well) Chhoti Jam Khurd	Mahu, Indore		Indore		Upload Photo
S-MP-355	Bavdi no. 3 (Step Well) Chhoti Jam Khurd	Mahu, Indore		Indore		Upload Photo
S-MP-356	Gouri Somnath Temple, Chouli	Khargone		Khargone	22°15′03″N 75°40′14″E	Upload Photo
S-MP-357	Ancient Temple Hiraidevi	Sanavad Khargone		Khargone	22°02′42″N 76°02′16″E	Upload Photo
S-MP-358	Hatkeshvar Temple, Un	Un, Khargone		Khargone	21°49′17″N 75°27′27″E	Upload Photo
S-MP-359	Jaleshwar Temple, Maheshwar	Maheshwar, Khargone		Khargone	22°10′15″N 75°35′52″E	Upload Photo
S-MP-360	Kaleshwar, Maheshwar	Maheshwar, Khargone		Khargone	22°10′15″N 75°35′57″E	Upload Photo
S-MP-361	Keshav Temple, Maheshwar	Maheshwar, Khargone		Khargone	22°10′16″N 75°35′37″E	Upload Photo
S-MP-362	Dholagiri Mahadev Temple	Khilchipura, Mandsaur		Mandsaur	24°02′32″N 75°04′28″E	Upload Photo
S-MP-363	Chaturbhuj Temple	Sandhara, Mandsaur		Mandsaur	24°33′53″N 75°52′11″E	Upload Photo
S-MP-364	Jain Temple	Sandhara, Mandsaur		Mandsaur	24°33′55″N 75°52′07″E	Upload Photo
S-MP-365	Chhatri	Afzalpur, Mandsaur		Mandsaur	23°58′47″N 75°13′57″E	Upload Photo
S-MP-366	Laxminarayan Mandir	Afzalpur, Mandsaur		Mandsaur		Upload Photo
S-MP-367	Gadi of Chandravata	Antraliya, Mandsaur		Mandsaur	24°25′55″N 75°39′15″E	Upload Photo
S-MP-368	Shiva Temple	Antraliya, Mandsaur		Mandsaur	24°25′52″N 75°39′14″E	Upload Photo
S-MP-369	Rock Shelter of Indargarh	Bhanpura		Mandsaur		Upload Photo
S-MP-370	Shiva Temple no 1	Neemthur, Mandsaur		Mandsaur	24°31′34″N 75°48′17″E	Upload Photo
S-MP-371	Shiva Temple no 2	Neemthur, Mandsaur		Mandsaur	24°32′04″N 75°48′15″E	Upload Photo
S-MP-372	Bharbhadiya Fort	Bharbhadiya		Neemuch	24°31′37″N 74°52′06″E	Upload Photo
S-MP-373	Fort Janglat	Ratangarh		Neemuch	24°49′01″N 75°06′36″E	Upload Photo
S-MP-374	Historical Dam	Kiratnagar, Raisen		Raisen	23°06′43″N 77°33′34″E	Historical Dam More images
S-MP-375	Bada Rajmahal	Rajgarh		Rajgarh	24°00′27″N 76°44′07″E	Upload Photo
S-MP-376	Chharbag ki Chhatri, Nevaj River	Rajgarh		Rajgarh	24°00′24″N 76°44′11″E	Upload Photo
S-MP-377	Morpipli Bawdi	Morpipli		Rajgarh	23°58′11″N 76°41′49″E	Upload Photo
S-MP-378	Handi Rani ki Bawdi, Lalgarh	Lalgarh		Rajgarh	23°59′15″N 76°48′56″E	Upload Photo
S-MP-379	Semli Jagir Bawdi, Lalgarh	Lalgarh		Rajgarh		Upload Photo
S-MP-380	Chhani Harin Temple	Machalpur, Rajgarh		Rajgarh	24°07′28″N 76°19′42″E	Upload Photo
S-MP-381	Image of Narsingh Dev & Temple Complex	Narsinghgarh		Rajgarh	23°42′37″N 77°05′40″E	Upload Photo
S-MP-382	Group of Ancient Temple, Devbadla	Devbadla Beelpan		Sehore	22°55′26″N 76°27′22″E	Upload Photo
S-MP-383	Mahidpur Fort	Mahidpur		Ujjain	23°29′48″N 75°39′01″E	Upload Photo
S-MP-384	Astronomy Study Bhuritori	Sironj		Vidisha	24°07′13″N 77°39′13″E	Upload Photo
S-MP-385	Graves of British People, Barenda	Sironj		Vidisha		Upload Photo
S-MP-386	Moulaji ki Pahadi	Sironj		Vidisha	24°06′32″N 77°40′56″E	Upload Photo
S-MP-387	Raghavji ki Haweli	Sironj		Vidisha	24°06′11″N 77°41′05″E	Upload Photo
S-MP-388	Vishnu Temple, Gopalpur	Sironj		Vidisha	24°11′32″N 77°47′01″E	Upload Photo
S-MP-389	Remains of Stupa, Jafarkhedi	Jafarkhedi		Vidisha	23°32′22″N 77°44′59″E	Upload Photo

NOTE: For all the Monuments whose coordinates are listed above; Images posted by visitors are available on Google Map.

== See also ==
- List of State Protected Monuments in India for other State Protected Monuments in India
- List of Monuments of National Importance in Madhya Pradesh
- Other Historic Heritage sites of Madhya Pradesh
