= List of State Protected Monuments in Madhya Pradesh =

This is a list of State Protected Monuments as officially reported by and available through the website of the Archaeological Survey of India in the Indian state Madhya Pradesh. The monument identifier is a combination of the abbreviation of the subdivision of the list (state, ASI circle) and the numbering as published on the website of the ASI. 326 State Protected Monuments were recognized by the ASI in Madhya Pradesh up to 2023.

Subsequently, Government of Madhya Pradesh under Directorate of Archaeology, Archives and Museums has added as well as deleted and reorganised the monuments under four zones; viz. Bhopal Zone - Central Zone, Gwalior Zone - North Zone, Indore Zone - West Zone and Jabalpur Zone - East Zone. The Districts of Madhya Pradesh are listed under these zones. The Monuments of each district are listed on a page with a short description and an image. 515 State Protected Monuments of Madhya Pradesh are listed in this format.

As this list of State Protected Monuments is long it has been split into two.

== List of State Protected Monuments ==
- List of State Protected Monuments in Madhya Pradesh/ East & North Zone
- List of State Protected Monuments in Madhya Pradesh/ Central & West Zone

Besides the State Protected Monuments, the Monuments of National Importance in this state has primary sites.

== See also ==
- List of State Protected Monuments in India for other State Protected Monuments in India
- List of Monuments of National Importance in Madhya Pradesh
- Other Historic Heritage sites of Madhya Pradesh
