= Golghar Museum =

Golghar has been repaired on 19 August 2023

Coordinates: 23.268092°N 77.390192°E

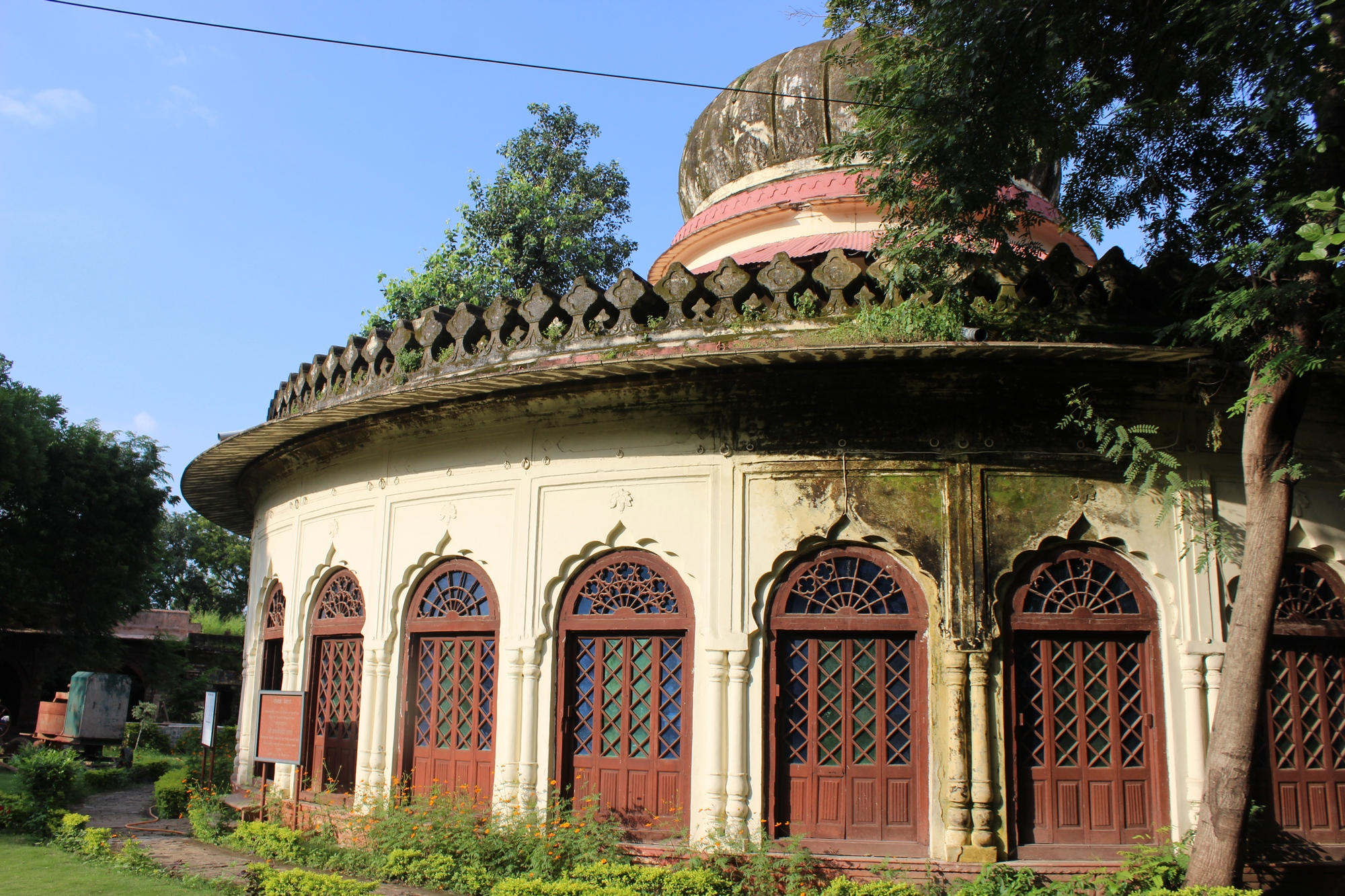
- Established: April 2013
- Location: Bhopal, Madhya Pradesh, India
- Type: Art and cultural museum
- Collections: Arts, handicrafts, social life from the Nawab-era
- Manager: Culture Minister Laxmikant Sharma

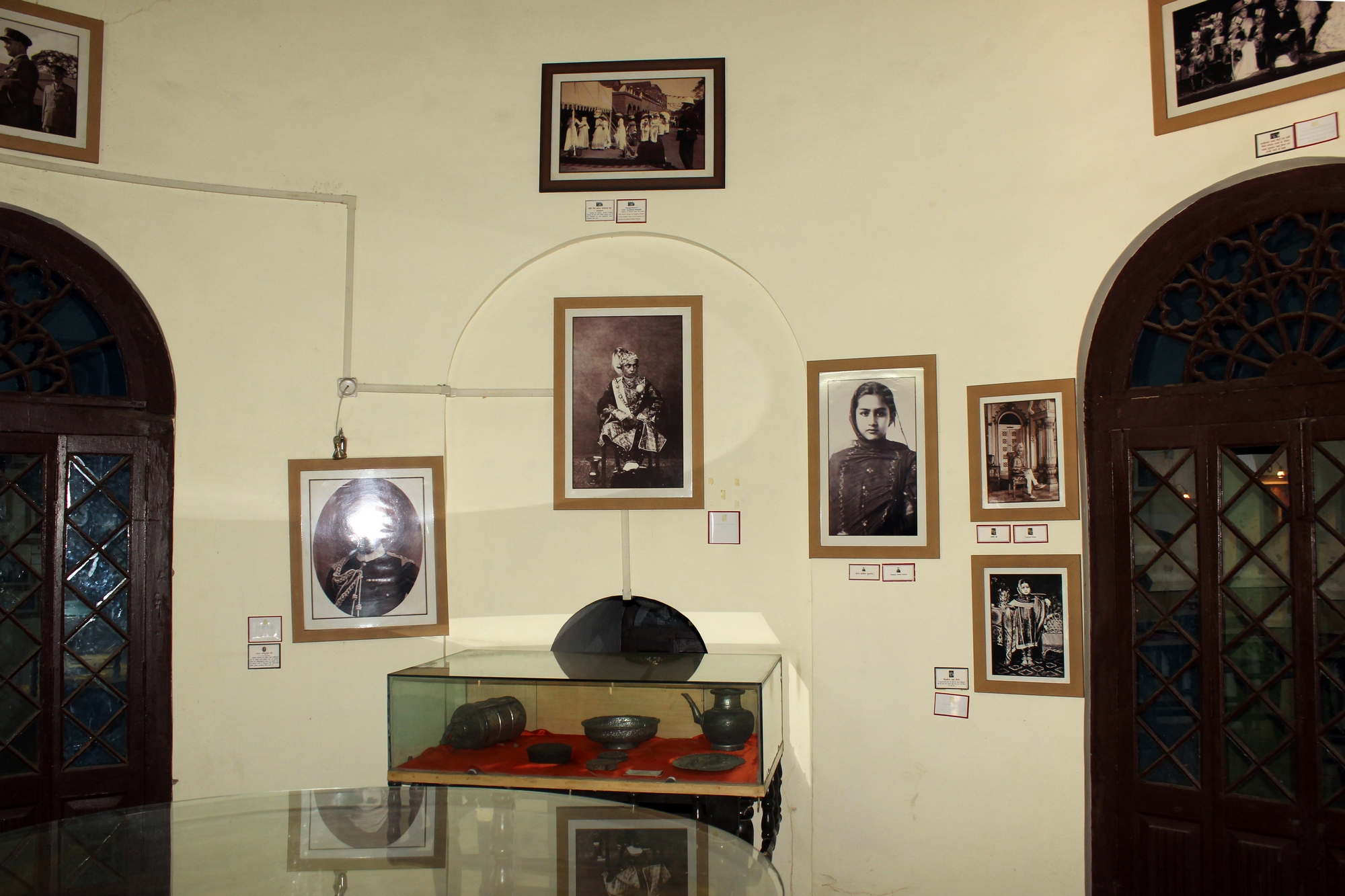
Interior

Golghar Museum is a museum in Bhopal, India. It showcases a variety of arts, handicraft and social life from the Nawab-era. The museum was inaugurated in April 2013 by Culture Minister Laxmikant Sharma. The major collections here denote the cultural and political history of the Princely State of Bhopal.
