= Tomb of Sawai Singh =

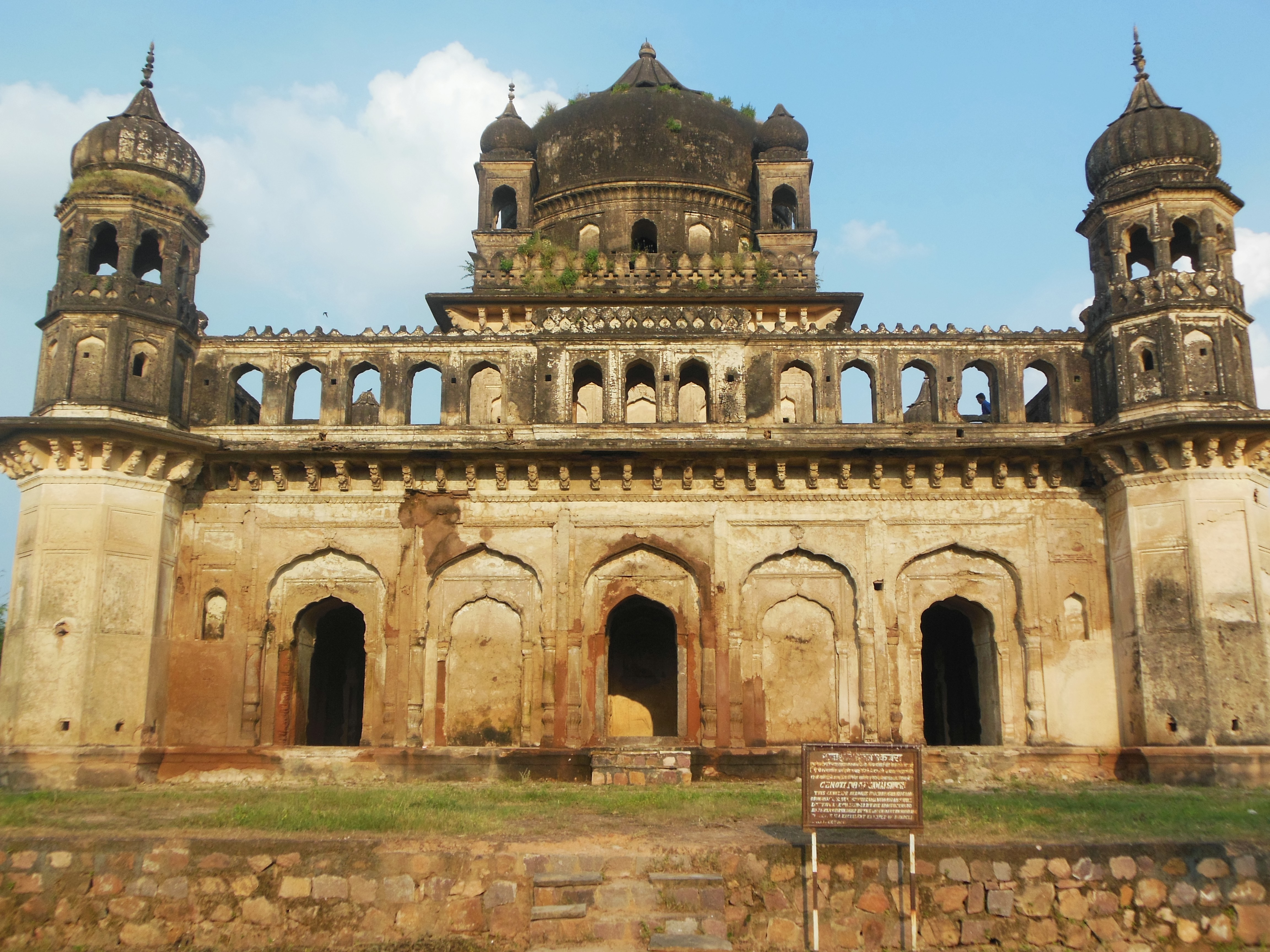
- Interactive map of Tomb of Sawai Singh
- Location: Chhatarpur District, Madhya Pradesh, India
- Coordinates: 25°00′10″N 79°29′44″E
- Built: 19th century

The Tomb of Sawai Singh is a 19th-century tomb built in Bundeli architectural style. The tomb has four bastions on all the four corners, with one large dome in the center and other smaller domes are near the bigger ones. The exterior side of these domes has full bloomed lotus petals as decorations.
