= List of Monuments of National Importance in Madhya Pradesh =

This is a list of Monuments of National Importance (ASI) as officially recognized by and available through the website of the Archaeological Survey of India in the Indian state Madhya Pradesh. The monument identifier is a combination of the abbreviation of the subdivision of the list (state, ASI circle) and the numbering as published on the website of the ASI. 292 Monuments of National Importance have been recognized by the ASI in Madhya Pradesh.

Due to the high amount of ASI-recognized monuments in Madhya Pradesh, the list is split into an eastern and western section:

- Madhya Pradesh/East: the districts Balaghat, Bhind, Chhatarpur, Chhindwara, Damoh, Datia, Ashok Nagar, Jabalpur, Katni, Mandla, Panna, Raisen, Rewa, Sagar, Satna, Seoni, Anuppur, Shahdol, Sidhi and Vidisha
- Madhya Pradesh/West: the districts Bhopal, Dewas, Dhar, Gwalior, Hoshangabad, Mandsaur, Morena, Burahanpur, Nimar (East), Nimar West, Shivpuri, Sehore and Ujjain

== See also ==
- List of Monuments of National Importance in India for other Monuments of National Importance in India
- List of State Protected Monuments in Madhya Pradesh
