= Balaghat Chinnor rice =

Type of non-Basmati aromatic rice from Madhya Pradesh, India

Balaghat Chinnor (बालाघाट चिन्नौर चावल)
- Geographical indication
- Description: Balaghat Chinnor is an aromatic rice cultivated in Madhya Pradesh
- Type: Aromatic rice
- Area: Balaghat district
- Country: India
- Registered: 14 September 2021
- Official website: ipindia.gov.in

Balaghat Chinnor is a variety of non-Basmati aromatic rice mainly grown in the Indian state of Madhya Pradesh. It is a common and widely cultivated crop in tehsils of Balaghat, Baihar, Birsa, Paraswada, Katangi, Waraseoni, Lalbarra, Khairlanji, Lanji and Kirnapur of Balaghat district

== Name ==
Balaghat Chinnor Rice is a prized crop in Balaghat and so named after it. "Chinnor" or "Chinnaur" is an acronym of the Hindi term “Chiknaiyukt Nokdaar Sugangdhit Chavur” which means Chiknaiyukt (Oily content), Nokdaar (Sharp tipped), Sugangdhit (Aromatic) and Chavur (Local name for Rice).

The word "Chinnor" (variations like "Chinnaur") has its roots in three distinct components:

1. Chi: Derived from "Chiknai Yukt," indicating the rice's high oil content.
2. Nau: Originating from "Nokdaar," meaning sharp tip, referring to the rice grain's shape.
3. R: Simply denoting "rice"

=== Local name ===
It is known as Balaghat Chinnor rice (बालाघाट चिन्नौर चावल) or simply as Chinnor rice.

== Description ==
Balaghat Chinnor rice is a ceremonial, traditional, aromatic, and endemic rice variety from Madhya Pradesh. It is renowned for its distinct aroma, taste, and softness, making it a staple in marriage feasts and religious ceremonies. Other features are:

=== Characteristics ===
- This variety of rice has a strong scent in both cooked and uncooked form. The cooked grains are soft, shiny, and slightly sticky. The grain shape is distinctive, with the apex resembling the tip of a sword.

=== Taste and Culinary Uses ===
- Unique taste
- Ideal for Kheer (creamy texture, distinct rice flavor, no added flavorings needed)
- Suitable for Puri, Anarsa (sweet and sour), roti, and cooked chawal (bhatt)

=== Cooking Properties ===
- This variety of rice has a quick cooking time. Additionally, it can be made into a smooth dough when mixed with warm water.

=== Cultural Significance ===
- In Balaghat temples, priests offer Chinnor Kheer as Prasad Bhog (blesses food), leveraging its aroma, sweetness, and milk-thickening properties.

=== By-Product ===
- Chinnor rice has a notable by-product with its rice bran containing a high oil content. The oil content in Chinnor rice bran is 20-21%, surpassing the 18-19% oil content found in the bran of regular rice varieties.

== Geographical indication ==
It was awarded the Geographical Indication (GI) status tag from the Geographical Indications Registry under the Union Government of India on 14 September 2021 (valid until 2 October 2029).

Balaghat Chinnor Utpadak Sahkari Samiti Maryadit Balaghat from Waraseoni, proposed the GI registration of Balaghat Chinnor rice. After filing the application in October 2019, the rice was granted the GI tag in 2021 by the Geographical Indication Registry in Chennai, making the name "Balaghat Chinnor rice" exclusive to the rice grown in the region. It thus became the first rice variety from Madhya Pradesh and the 12th type of goods from Madhya Pradesh to earn the GI tag.

The GI tag protects the rice from illegal selling and marketing, and gives it legal protection and a unique identity.
