= List of Indian cities on rivers =

The following is a list of the cities in India through which major rivers flow.

== Andhra Pradesh ==
City	River
Rajahmundry	Godavari
Vijayawada, Mangalagiri - Tadepalli, Amaravati	Krishna
Hindupur, Tadipatri, Yerraguntla, Jammalamadugu, Nellore	Pennar
Kurnool	Tungabhadra
Nandyala	Kundu River
Srikakulam	Nagavali River

== Assam ==
City	River
Dibrugarh, Guwahati	Brahmaputra

== Bihar ==
City	River
Gaya	Falgu (Neeranjana)
Bhagalpur, Patna, Hajipur, Munger, Jamalpur, Buxar	Ganga
Supaul	Koshi
Darbhanga, Saharsa	Bagmati River
Muzaffarpur	Burhi Gandak River

== Chhattisgarh ==
City	River
Durg - Bhilai; Simga	Shivnath River
Bilaspur	Arpa River
Jagdalpur	Indravati River
Manendragarh, Korba, Champa	Hasdeo River
Raipur, Durg	Kharun River
Balod	Tandula river

== Delhi ==
City	River
New Delhi	Yamuna River

== Daman ==
City	River
Daman	Daman Ganga

== Gujarat ==
City	River
Ahmedabad	Sabarmati
Deesa	Banas
Surat	Tapi
Vadodara	Vishwamitri
Modasa	Mazum
Morbi	Machchu
Rajkot	Aji
Himmatnagar	Hathmati
Patan	Saraswati
Valsad	Auranga
Bharuch	Narmada
Navsari	Purna

== Karnataka ==
City	River
Bengaluru	Vrishabhavathi, Ponnaiyar
Mangaluru	Netravati, Gurupura
Shivamogga	Tunga
Bhadravathi	Bhadra
Hosapete	Tungabhadra
Kalaburagi, Raichur	Krishna
Karwar	Kali
Bagalkote	Ghataprabha
Honnavar	Sharavathi

== Madhya Pradesh ==
City	River
Multai, Burhanpur, Nepanagar	Tapti
Mandala, Jabalpur, Narmadapuram, Maheshwar	Narmada
Anuppur, Burhar, Bansagar	Son
Ujjain, Mahidpur	Shipra River
Ashta	Parbati River
Rehli, Garhakota, Hatta	Sunar River
Gairatganj, Begamganj, Rahatgarh, Bina	Bina River
Shujalpur, Rajgarh	Newaj River
Vidisha, Ganj Basoda, Kurwai, Orchha	Betwa River
Balaghat, Chhapara, Keolari	Wainganga River
Sonkatch, Sarangpur	Kali Sindh River
Narwar, Dabra, Seondha	Sindh River
Gadarwara	Shakkar River
Nagda	Chambal River
Mandsaur	Shivna River
Pandhurna	Jam River
Katangi, Waraseoni	Chandan

== Maharashtra ==
City	River
Pandharpur	Bhima
Alandi, Dehu	Indrayani
Bhusawal	Tapti River
Gangakhed, Nashik, Nanded	Godavari
Jalgaon, Malegaon	Girna River
Pune	Mula, Mutha
Karjat	Ulhas
Mahad	Savitri
Kolhapur	Panchaganga
Sangli	Krishna
Karad	Krishna, Koyna
Chandrapur	Erai
Nagpur	Nag
Bhandara, Gadchiroli	Wainganga
Ballarpur	Wardha
Sironcha	Godavari, Pranhita

== Odisha ==
City	River
Banki, Cuttack, Sambalpur	Mahanadi
Brahmapur, Chhatrapur	Rushikulya
Rourkela	Brahmani

== Punjab ==
City	River
Ferozpur, Ludhiana, Rupnagar	Sutlej
Amritsar, Pathankot	Ravi River
Harike, Beas	Beas River

== Rajasthan ==
City	River
Jhalawar	Kali Sindh River
Rawatbhata, Kota, Keshoraipatan, Dholpur	Chambal
Barmer	Luni
Chittorgarh	Berach River
Udaipur	Ahar River

== Sikkim ==
City	River
Rangpo	Teesta

== Tamil Nadu ==
City	River
Chennai	Cooum (Koovam), Adyar
Coimbatore	Noyyal
Madurai	Vaigai
Thiruchirapalli, Erode	Kaveri
Tirunelveli	Thamirabarani
Kanchipuram	Vegavathi, Palar

== Telangana ==
City	River
Hyderabad	Musi
Karimnagar	Manair
Ramagundam, Nizamabad	Godavari

== Uttar Pradesh ==
City	River
Prayagraj	At the confluence of Ganga, Yamuna and Saraswati
Ayodhya	Sarayu
Chakeri, Farrukhabad, Kasganj, Fatehgarh, Kanpur, Kannauj, Mirzapur, Shuklaganj, Varanasi	Ganga
Kairana, Baghpat, Ghaziabad, Noida, Greater Noida, Vrindavan, Mathura, Agra, Firozabad, Etawah, Auraiya, Kalpi, Hamirpur	Yamuna
Jaunpur, Lucknow	Gomti
Jhansi	Pahuj
Banda	Ken
Gorakhpur	Rapti
Budaun	Sot
Ghaziabad, Noida	Hindon
Moradabad, Bareilly	Ramganga

== Uttarakhand ==
City	River
Rishikesh	Ganga
Badrinath	Alaknanda River
Devprayag	on the confluences of Bhagirathi and Alaknanda River
Haridwar	Ganga
Karnaprayag	on the confluences of Pindar River and Alaknanda River
Nandaprayag	on the confluences of Nandakini River and Alaknanda River
Rudraprayag	on the confluences of Mandakini River and Alaknanda River
Vishnuprayag	on the confluences of Dhauliganga River and Alaknanda River

== West Bengal ==
Cities	River
Alipurduar	Kaljani
Asansol	Ajay and Damodar
Bardhaman, Durgapur, Raniganj	Damodar
Bolpur, Chittaranjan	Ajay
Baharampur, Murshidabad, Nabadwip, Kalyani, Tribeni, Bandel, Hooghly, Chandannagar, Serampore, Barrackpur, Dakshineshwar, Titagarh, Kamarhati, Baranagar, Howrah, Kolkata, Uluberia	Hooghly
Bongaon, Basirhat, Taki	Ichamati
Burnpur, Kulti	Barakar
Balurghat	Atrai
Arambagh, Bankura, Bishnupur	Dwarakeshwar
Tarapith	Dwarka River
Cooch Behar	Torsa
Dhupguri, Falakata	Jaldhaka
Haldia	Haldi and Hooghly
Jalpaiguri	Teesta and Karala
Kalimpong	Teesta
Katwa	Ajay and Hooghly
Kolaghat, Tamluk	Rupnarayan
Krishnanagar	Jalangi
Malda	Mahananda
Raiganj	Kulik
Ranaghat	Churni
Siliguri	Mahananda, Teesta and Balasan
Suri, Sainthia	Mayurakshi
Kharagpur, Midnapore, Panskura, Purulia	Kangsabati (Kansai)
