= Katangi railway station =

Railway station in India

Coordinates: 21.7655°N 79.8098°E

Katangi Railway Station
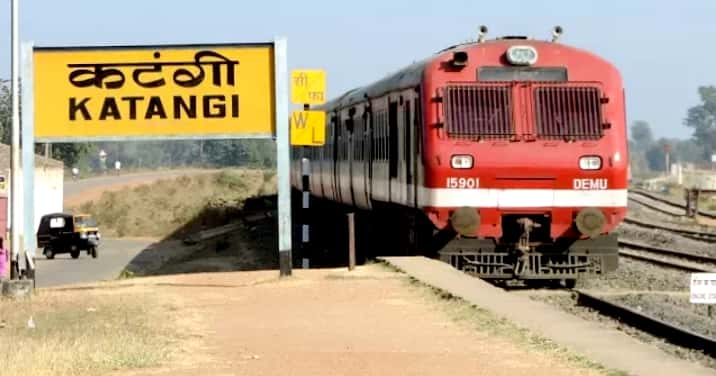
- A Passenger train passes through katangi railway station

General information
- Location: Selwa Road, Katangi, Balaghat, Madhya Pradesh
- Owner: Indian Railways
- Lines: Bilaspur–Nagpur section Balaghat–Gondia line
- Platforms: 2
- Tracks: Broad gauge

Construction
- Parking: Available
- Cycle facilities: Available

Other information
- Station code: KGE
- Fare zone: South East Central Railway

History
- Electrified: Construction Electric line
Location
- Location within India Location within Madhya Pradesh

Katangi railway station (station code KGE) is a railway station in Katangi block of Balaghat district in Madhya Pradesh, India. It is on a broad-gauge network, in the South East Central Railway zone. It is connected with Waraseoni, Balaghat, and Gondia.

== Stations between Katangi and Gondia ==
1. Katangi
2. Lakhanwara
3. Kochewahi
4. Saongi
5. Waraseoni
6. Kaydi
7. Garra
8. Balaghat
9. Kanhadgaon
10. Hatta Road
11. Khara (p.h.)
12. Birsola
13. Gatra
14. Pratap bagh
15. Nagradham
16. Gondia
