= Garra, Balaghat =

Coordinates: 21.801°N 80.144°E

Garra
- Location within India
- Country: India
- State: Madhya Pradesh
- District: Balaghat

Languages
- Time zone: UTC+5:30 (IST)

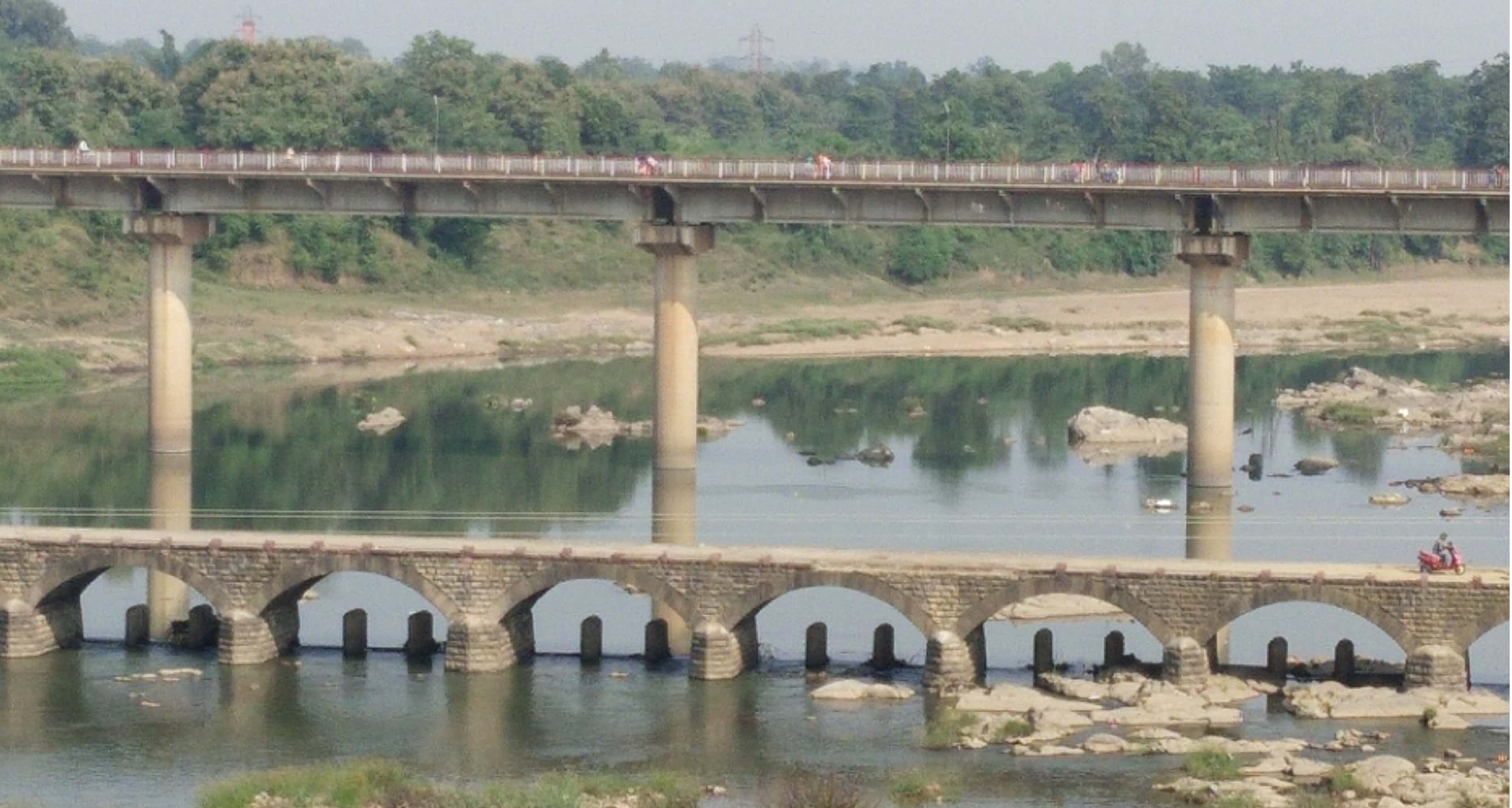
Wainganga river bridge in Garra, Balaghat

Garra is a village in Balaghat District of India, with a population of 4,097 (as of 2011 census).

== Geography ==
The village is located 4.5 km east of the city of Balaghat, on the banks of the Wainganga river.

== Amenities ==
The Garra Botanical Garden is a popular tourist attraction.

== Transport ==
The Garra Railway Station serves the diesel multiple unit (DEMU) train, which travels between Katangi and Gondia.

== Culture ==
Poha, or "Garra-Poha", is a local dish made from flattened rice,

== Economy ==
It has substantial textile makers.

== Leaders ==
Garra's progression from a traditional village to a more developed area is largely credited to Dharmendra Trivedi (पप्पू त्रिवेदी), now known as the son of Garra Pappu. Trivedi spent his whole life developing the village. He managed the panchayat for 25 years.

The first woman sarpanch (head of village) of gram Garra is Reena Devendra Trivedi, another member of the Trivedi family.
