= Ukwa (disambiguation) =

Ukwa is a census town in Madhya Pradesh.

Ukwa may also refer to:

- UKWA, a radio station in Perth, Australia
- Ukwa language, a language spoken in Nigeria
- Ukwa is a Nigerian breadfruit dish eaten by the Igbo people.
- The UK Web Archive
