= Garra railway station =

Railway station in Madhya Pradesh

Coordinates: 21.7999°N 80.1471°E

Garra Railway Station
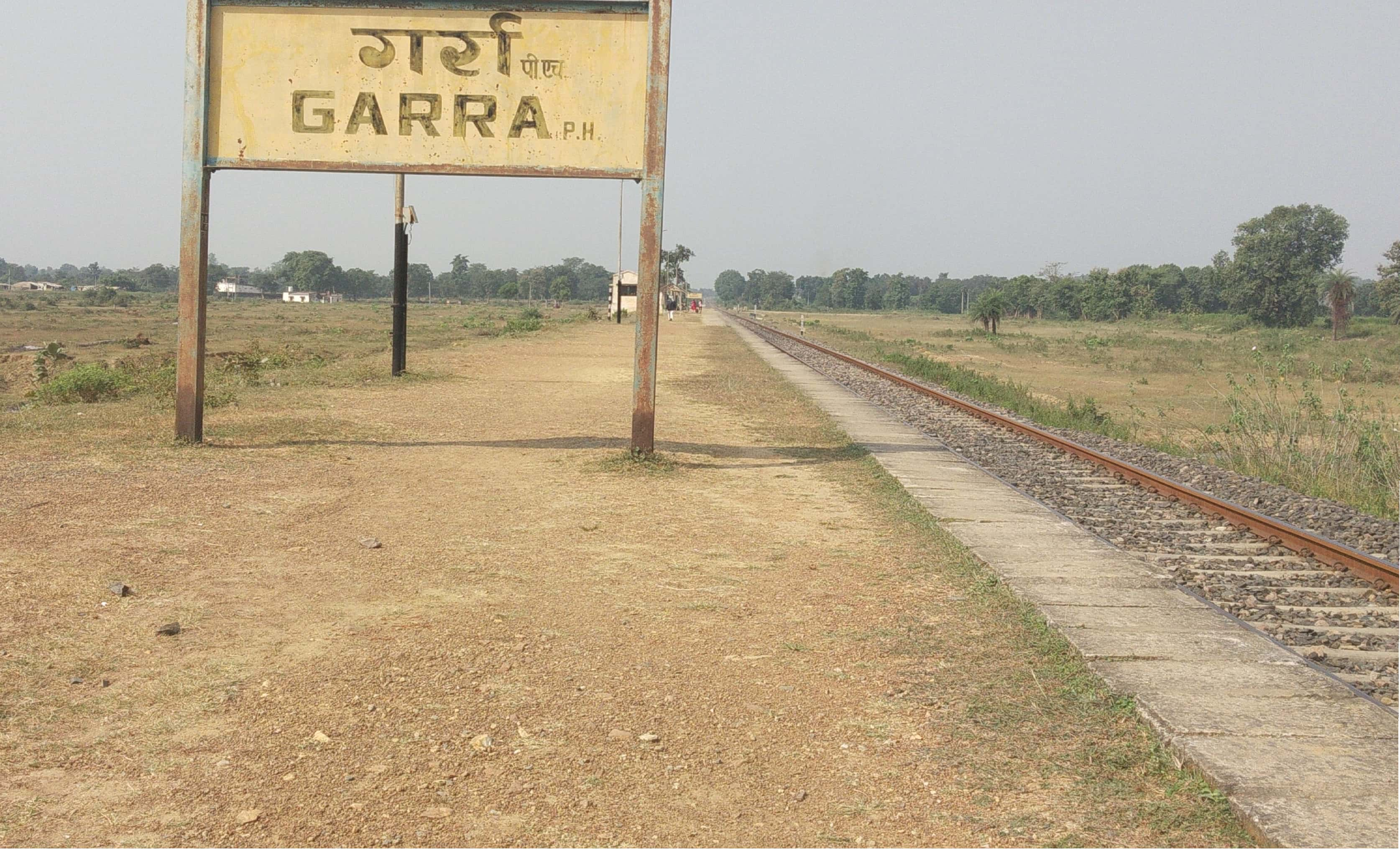
- Garra Station Signage

General information
- Location: Garra, Balaghat, Madhya Pradesh; India
- Line: 1
- Platforms: 1

Construction
- Parking: Not available

Other information
- Station code: GRHX
- Fare zone: South East Central Railway Zone

History
- Electrified: Non- electrified

Passengers
- 10-15
Location
- Location within India Location within Madhya Pradesh

Garra railway station is the railway station of Garra village in Balaghat district, Madhya Pradesh, India. Its station code is GRHX. It serves the SECR railways. It is on the Gondia–Balaghat–Katangi line.
