= Budhee =

- Area
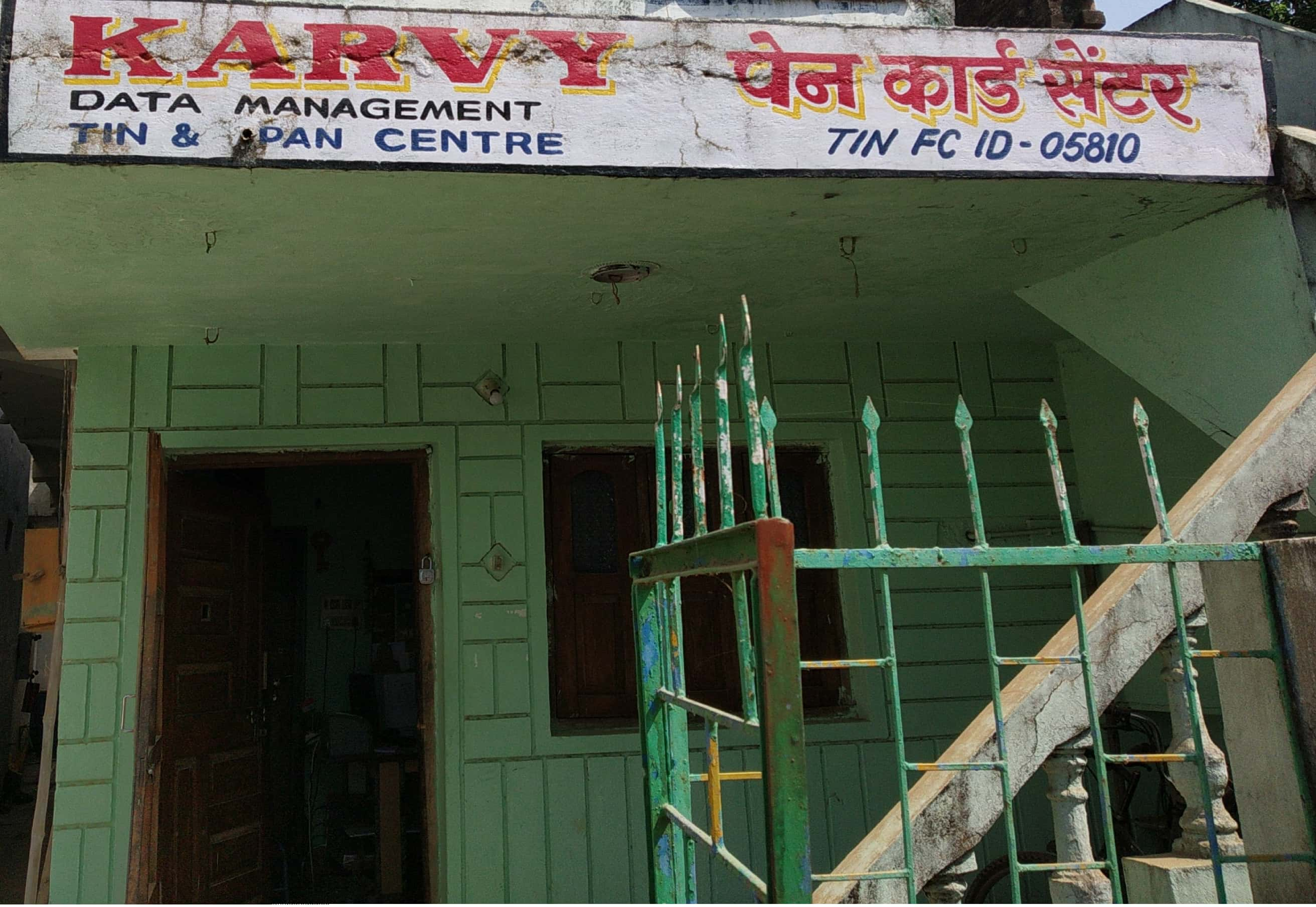
- An online working shop in Budhee
- Country: India
- States: Madhya Pradesh
- District: Balaghat

Budhee is an area and municipality in Balaghat, Madhya Pradesh, India.

== Ward ==
- Ward no. 11
- Ward no. 12
- Ward no. 13

== Schools and Institutes ==
1. Johnson's Kids Care English Medium School Balaghat.
2. Gayatri Vidhya Mandir
3. Anupam school (before- Pragya vidhya peeth)
4. Kamla Higher Secondary School
5. Satpuda Pvt ITI, Budhi
6. Adarsh Jyoti school, Ganganagar
7. Privartan Mission school
8. Methodist Mission English school
9. Govt. Primary & Middle school, Dheemartola
10. Govt. ITI Balaghat

== Gallery ==
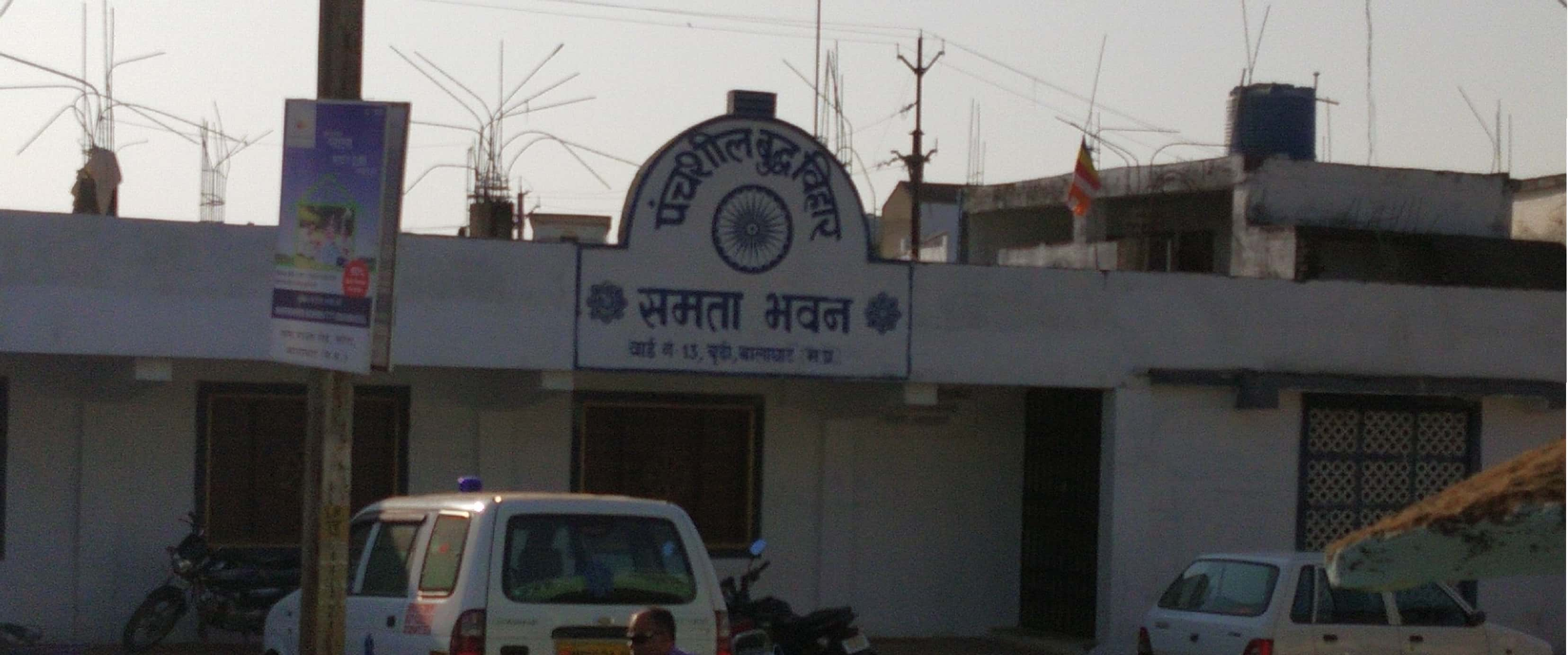
A building in Budhee, Balaghat.
