= Rajeev Sagar Dam =

Rajeev Sagar Dam राजीव सागर बाँध परियोजना
- Location within Madhya Pradesh Location within India
- Official name: Rajiv Sagar (Maksudangarh) Dam
- Country: India
- Location: Kudwa
- Coordinates: 21.5442°N 79.5473°E
- Purpose: Irrigation
- Construction began: 1979–80 but stopped in 1983–84
- Opening date: 2002
- Construction cost: 161.57 crore Rs.

Dam and spillways
- Type of dam: Earthen
- Length: 700 m

Reservoir
- Creates: Bawanthadi Reservoir (Kudwa)

Rajeev Sagar Dam (alternatively Rajiv Sagar (Maksudangarh) Dam) is a dam near the Katangi block in Balaghat district, Madhya Pradesh, India.

The dam was originally built in the 19th century.

It is approximately 60 km from Katangi, and a bus service is available for it.
