= Baihar Assembly constituency =

Constituency of the Madhya Pradesh legislative assembly in India

Coordinates: 22.10°N 80.55°E

Baihar
- Constituency No. 108 for the Madhya Pradesh Legislative Assembly

Constituency details
- Country: India
- Region: Central India
- State: Madhya Pradesh
- District: Balaghat
- Lok Sabha constituency: Balaghat
- Established: 1951
- Reservation: ST

Member of Legislative Assembly
- 16th Madhya Pradesh Legislative Assembly
- Incumbent Sanjay Uikey
- Party: Indian National Congress
- Elected year: 2023
- Preceded by: Bhagat Singh Netam

Baihar Assembly constituency is one of the 230 Vidhan Sabha (Legislative Assembly) constituencies of Madhya Pradesh state in central India.

It is part of Balaghat District.

== Members of Legislative Assembly ==
=== As a constituency of Madhya Bharat ===
- 1951, Nainsingh Indian National Congress

=== As a constituency of Madhya Pradesh ===
Election	Member	Party
1957	Murlidhar Batailal Asati	Indian National Congress
1962	Mahimalsingh Masaram	Independent
1967	Mahimalsingh Masaram	Indian National Congress
1972	Sudhanva Singh Netam	Bharatiya Jana Sangh
1977	Sudhanva Singh Netam	Janata Party
1980	Ganpat Singh Uikey	Indian National Congress (Indira)
1985	Ganpat Singh Uikey	Indian National Congress
1990	Sudhanva Singh Netam	Bharatiya Janata Party
1993	Ganpat Singh Uikey	Indian National Congress
1998	Ganpat Singh Uikey	Indian National Congress
2003	Bhagat Singh Netam	Bharatiya Janata Party
2008	Bhagat Singh Netam	Bharatiya Janata Party
2013	Sanjay Uikey	Indian National Congress
2018	Sanjay Uikey	Indian National Congress
2023	Sanjay Uikey	Indian National Congress

== Election results ==
=== 2023 ===
2023 Madhya Pradesh Legislative Assembly election: Baihar
Party	Candidate	Votes	%	±%
INC	Sanjay Uikey	90,142	45.33	−0.39
BJP	Bhagat Singh Netam	89,591	45.06	+8.83
GGP	Fattesingh Kamlesh	8,646	4.35	−5.44
CPI	Ashok Masih Dhurve	2,543	1.28	+0.19
NOTA	None of the above	3,484	1.75	−1.27
Majority		551	0.27	−9.22
Turnout		198,841	85.83	+5.15
INC hold		Swing		

=== 2018 ===
2018 Madhya Pradesh Legislative Assembly election: Baihar
Party	Candidate	Votes	%	±%
INC	Sanjay Uikey	79,399	45.72	
BJP	Anupama Netam	62,919	36.23	
GGP	Thakur Gopal Singh Kushare	16,994	9.79	
CPI	Ashok Masih Dhurwey	1,900	1.09	
AAP	Dilan Singh Kodape	1,777	1.02	
BSP	Bairagsingh Tekam	1,575	0.91	
NOTA	None of the above	5,249	3.02	
Majority		16,480	9.49	
Turnout		173,669	80.68	
INC hold		Swing		

=== 2013 ===
M. P. Legislative Assembly Election, 2013: Baihar
Party	Candidate	Votes	%	±%
INC	Sanjay Uikey	82,419	52.79	
BJP	Bhagat Singh Netam	50067	32.07	
GGP	Shankar Shah Walke	4842	3.10	
CPI	Ka. Ashok Kumar Masih	4641	2.97	
BSP	Asha Warkade	2733	1.75	N/A
Independent	Vinod Kushre	2049	1.31	
Independent	Hare Singh Pusham	1662	1.06	
Independent	Ram Singh Tekam	1627	1.04	
Independent	Bairag Singh Tekam	1210	0.78	
NOTA	None of the Above	4873	3.12	
Majority				
Turnout		156123	78.14	
Swing to INC from BJP		Swing		

== See also ==
Baihar
