= Chandan River (Madhya Pradesh) =

River in Madhya Pradesh, India

Location
- Country: India
- State: Madhya Pradesh
- Region: Central India

Physical characteristics
- Mouth: Wainganga River
  - coordinates: 21°33′31″N 80°01′51″E

The Chandan River is a river which primarily flows through Balaghat district of Madhya Pradesh, India.

Chandan River mainly flows in the Balaghat District. Katangi and Waraseoni town are located on the banks of Chandan river.

Chandan River's mouth is in Wainganga River.

== Places ==
- The Nahlesara Dam was built from 1960 to 1965. Constructed on the Chandan River, the dam is about 2 km long and serves the irrigation purpose of nearby villages.
- Rampayli is a place located bank of Chandan River.
