= Jeonara =

- village
- Location in Madhya Pradesh, India
- Coordinates: 22°2′29″N 79°46′40″E
- Country: India
- State: Madhya Pradesh
- District: Seoni

Government
  - Body: Gram panchayat
- Elevation: 655 m (2,149 ft)

Languages
  - Official: Hindi
- Time zone: UTC+5:30 (IST)
- PIN: 480667
- Telephone code: 07692
- ISO 3166 code: IN-MP
- Nearest city: Seoni
- Lok Sabha constituency: Balaghat
- Vidhan Sabha constituency: Barghat

Jeonara is a village in the Seoni district of Madhya Pradesh, India.

It is situated at an altitude of 513 metres (1,683 ft) and lies 4 kilometres (2.5 mi) from Barghat, the Tehsil headquarters, and 28 kilometres (17 mi) from Seoni, the district headquarters.

The major profession of the villagers is agriculture. State Highway 26 [SH-26] passes through village which links district headquarters Seoni with neighboring district Balaghat.

== History ==
The village was owned by the local Rahangdale family. Shri Kusa Rahangdale bought the village and his son Shri Inka Rahangdale planned and reformed it around 1780. The tenth generation of this family is still serving with their high value ancestral public welfare program. Shri Ram Singh Rahangdale has been a prominent personality of this village. His son, Shri Gajanand Rahangdale, is the chief land owner of the village and is the Chairman of Satyaprerana Vidyamandir committee, which runs schools for the primary education of poor children. His brother, Shri Mahanand Rahangdale, is a known lawyer and politician and had contested for Barghat constituency in the 1998 state elections.

A tributary of the river Wainganga passes by this village, known as Hirri. The Wainganga is referred in Rudyard Kipling's Jungle Book.

== Festivals ==
This place is well known in the region for its Mahashivratri Mela, a religious gathering of Shiva devotees, every year in February/March. The local Mela Samiti or festival committee takes care of event. The 3-day festival concludes with a bullock cart race.

== State Government Establishments ==
Jeonara is known to be Madhya Pradesh's largest fish seed production farm, operated by the state government. The fish seed supplied to the entirety of Madhya Pradesh, some parts of Uttar Pradesh, Bihar, Chhattisgarh and Maharashtra.
