= Rajegaon =

- Village
- Location within Madhya Pradesh Location within India
- Coordinates: 21.631°N 80.249°E
- Country: India
- State: Madhya Pradesh
- District: Balaghat

Government
  - Type: Gram panchayat

Languages
- Time zone: UTC+5:30 (IST)

Rajegaon is a village and gram panchayat in Kirnapur tehsil of Balaghat district in Madhya Pradesh, India. It is situated on the Madhya Pradesh – Maharashtra border. It is approx 22 kilometres (14 mi) from Balaghat, the district headquarters, and 10 kilometres (6.2 mi) from Kirnapur. Buses are available to reach it.
