= Sanjay Uikey =

Indian politician

Member of the Madhya Pradesh Legislative Assembly
- Incumbent
- Assumed office 2013
- Preceded by: Bhagat Singh Netam
- Constituency: Baihar

Personal details
- Born: 22 February 1968 (age 58) Village Bhimjori, Balaghat
- Party: Indian National Congress
- Spouse: Urmila Uikey
- Education: B.A.
- Alma mater: Vinayak Mission University
- Profession: Activist, politician
- As of 13 June, 2018 Source: ["Biography:Uikey, Sanjay" (PDF). Madhya Pradesh Legislative Assembly.]

Sanjay Uikey is an Indian politician and a member of the Indian National Congress party. He is currently the MLA of Baihar Vidhansabha from the Madhya Pradesh legislative assembly. He is the son of Late Ganpat Singh Uikey who was formerly Cabinet Minister in the Madhya Pradesh legislative assembly and four times MLA from Baihar.

== Political career ==
He became an MLA in 2013 Madhya Pradesh Legislative Assembly election. Before that he was the Chairman of Malanjkhand Municipality (Malanjkhand Nagar Palika).

== Personal life ==
He is married to Urmila Uikey and has two daughters.

== See also ==
- Madhya Pradesh Legislative Assembly
- 2013 Madhya Pradesh Legislative Assembly election
