= Lalbarra =

- Location within Madhya Pradesh Location within India
- Coordinates: 21°56′32″N 80°02′58″E
- Country: India
- State: Madhya Pradesh
- District: Balaghat

Languages
- Time zone: UTC+5:30 (IST)

Lalbarra, alternatively Lalburra is a small town and serves as headquarter of Lalburra tehsil. It is a tehsil (sub-district) of Balaghat district in the state of Madhya Pradesh, India. It is located on State Highway 26, on the edge of Pench National Park. Its Postal Index Number is 481441.

== Schools ==
Schools in Lalbarra Tehsil include:

- Golden Valley Public School
- Educare Public School
- Oriental English Higher Secondary School
- Vaidik Convent School
- Vivek jyoti gyan pith
- Excellence school
- Vidhya Sagar
- Navin Bharti vidhya pith

== Transportation ==
Lalbara is well connected to nearby towns like Balaghat, Garra, Wara Seoni, Katangi, Lamta, and Seoni. It is also directly connected to cities like Jabalpur, Bhopal, Indore and Nagpur via bus routes.The nearest airport is Jabalpur.

== Attractions ==
- Dhuty Dam
- Tekadi Talab
- Sonewane jungle - Tekadi
- Potiapaat wainganga river
- Sai mandir Bakoda
- Bomblai Devi

== See also ==
- Garra
