= Dighoda =

- Location within India
- Country: India
- State: Madhya Pradesh
- District: Balaghat

Languages
- Time zone: UTC+5:30 (IST)

Dighoda is a village in Balaghat district of Madhya Pradesh state of India. The village has total population of 1028 according the 2011 census. Agriculture and Dairy are most common occupation of people of Dighoda. The village is surrounded by farmland and is on the Ghisri River. Rice is main cultivation of this village.
