= Sarrati River =

River in Madhya Pradesh, India

Coordinates: 21°54′46″N 80°09′05″E

Sarrati River is a river that flows in Madhya Pradesh state of India. It is a tributary of the Wainganga River. The Wainganga itself is a tributary of the Godavari River. Lalbarra is situated on the banks of the Sarrati.
