= Mahadeo Hills =

Range of hills in Madhya Pradesh state of central India

Coordinates: 22.36°N 78.56°E

The Mahadeo Hills are a range of hills in Madhya Pradesh state of central India. The highest peak of Mahadeo Hills is Pachmari (1067 m). The hills are situated in the northern section of the Satpura Range.

The Mahadeo Hills run east and west through Betul, Chhindwara, and Seoni districts, separating the basin of the Narmada River to the north from that of the Wainganga and Wardha rivers, tributaries of the Godavari, to the south. The hills slope gently in the north, but drop steeply to the south onto the Deccan Plateau. The hills are home to tropical moist deciduous forests, part of the Eastern highlands moist deciduous forests ecoregion.

Mahadeo Temple

The Mahadeo Hills also conceal a temple near the Narmada River that is dedicated to Shiva, the god of destruction in the Hindu religion. It is believed that the Narmada River is a daughter of the destroyer god.
