= Rampayli =

Town in Madhya Pradesh, India

- Town
- Location in Madhya Pradesh, India
- Coordinates: 21.67°N 80.01°E

Rampayli is a town located in Balaghat District, Madhya Pradesh.

== Population ==
The Rampayli village has a population of 5491 of which 2744 are males and 2747 are females according to the 2011 census of India. This includes 1312 families.

== Location ==
Rampayli is located on 21.67°N 80.01°E the banks of the Chandan River. Waraseoni is the closest city.

== Rampayli Temple ==
It is said that Lord Rama was in the footsteps of 14 years of exile, since then the name of this city has become Ram Pavdali, i.e. Ram Paiyali. According to the local people, the construction of Sri Ram temple was done 600 years ago by Maratha Bhonsle in a scientific manner as a fort on the river banks.Such a place has been constructed in the temple, from which the first ray of sun falls at the feet of Lord Ram Balaji. The construction of this temple is mentioned in the ancient history of India.

The main Siddha Murthy of Shri Ram Mandir is Balaji and Sitaji. The idol of Lord Rama is in the forested form. The left hand of Ram Dev is seeing the Virat monsters and giving them blessings on the head of the fearful Sita. Those devotees give direct views of Sriram and Sita.

This statue of Lord Rama's Vanvasi costume was received from the depth of the Chandan River, about four hundred years ago, when a person was seen in the dream. The statue was removed and placed under the Neem tree on the river teak and King Bhosale renovated the temple and established the idol.
