= Bharveli =

- town
- Location in Madhya Pradesh, India Bharveli (India)
- Coordinates: 21°50′24″N 80°13′52″E
- Country: India
- State: Madhya Pradesh
- District: Balaghat

Population (2001)
  - Total: 9,101

Languages
  - Official: Hindi
- Time zone: UTC+5:30 (IST)
- ISO 3166 code: IN-MP
- Vehicle registration: MP-50

Bharveli is a census town in Balaghat district in the state of Madhya Pradesh, India.

== Demographics ==
As of 2001 India census, Bharveli had a population of 9,101. Males constitute 50% of the population and females 50%. Bharveli has an average literacy rate of 65%, higher than the national average of 59.5%; with male literacy of 74% and female literacy of 57%. 15% of the population is under 6 years of age.
