= Dhuty Dam =

- Location within India
- Interactive map of Dhuty Dam
- Coordinates: 22.1146366°N 80.0500882°E
- Construction began: 1917
- Opening date: 1923

Dam and spillways
- Impounds: Wainganga River
- Length: 2,003 m (6,572 ft)
- Elevation at crest: 11.8 m

Dhuty Dam, officially the Dhuti Weir, is a diversion head work over Wainganga River near Lamta in Balaghat district of the Indian state of Madhya Pradesh. The dam was built in 1923 under the supervision of the British civil engineer Sir George Moss Harriot. There are two canals on the sides of the dam. The canal on the eastern side provides irrigation to Lamta, the one on the western side to Lalbarra.

The structure spans 2003 meters and is 11.8 m high.
