= Ukwa =

- Census town
- Location in Madhya Pradesh, India Ukwa (India)
- Coordinates: 21.97°N 80.47°E
- Country: India
- State: Madhya Pradesh
- District: Balaghat
- Elevation: 608 m (1,995 ft)

Population (2001)
  - Total: 7,108

Languages
  - Official: Hindi
- Time zone: UTC+5:30 (IST)
- PIN: 481105
- ISO 3166 code: IN-MP
- Vehicle registration: MP-50

Ukwa is a census town in Balaghat district in the Indian state of Madhya Pradesh.

== Geography ==
Ukwa is located at 21.97°N 80.47°E. It has an average elevation of 608 metres (1,994 feet).

== Demographics ==
As of 2001 India census, Ukwa had a population of 7,108. Males constitute 50% of the population and females 50%. Ukwa has an average literacy rate of 72%, higher than the national average of 59.5%: male literacy is 80%, and female literacy is 64%. In Ukwa, 14% of the population is under 6 years of age.

== Manganese mine ==
A manganese ore mine, Ukwa Mine, was developed by the British in Ukwa.. It has the largest deposit of manganese ore as an underground mine. The largest and first aerial ropeway line in Asia was used to transport the ore from Ukwa to Bharweli.
