= Wainganga River =

River in central India

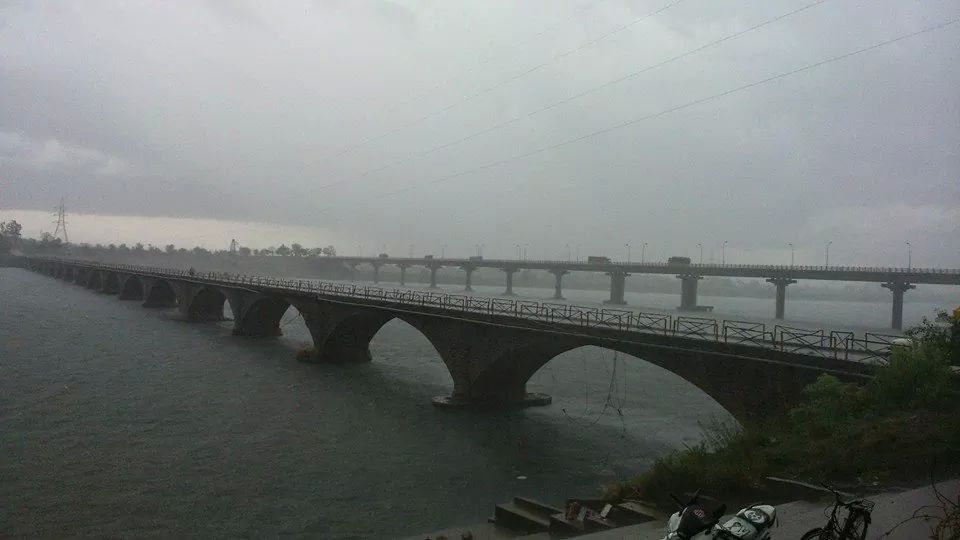
- Wainganga River in Bhandara City

Location
- Country: India
- State: Madhya Pradesh, Maharashtra
- Cities: Chhapara, Seoni, Balaghat, Bhandara and Pauni

Physical characteristics
- Source: Mundara
  - location: MUNDARA, Seoni District, Madhya Pradesh
  - coordinates: 21°57′N 79°34′E
  - elevation: 1,048 m (3,438 ft)
- Mouth: Pranahita River
  - location: Adilabad district, Gadchiroli District, border of the 2 districts
  - coordinates: 19°35′24″N 79°47′59″E
  - elevation: 146 m (479 ft)
- Length: 569 km (354 mi)
- Basin size: 43,658 km^{2} (16,856 sq mi)

Basin features
- Tributaries
  - left: Thanwar River, Nahara River, Sonbiri River, Bagh River, Chulband River, Gadhavi River, Triveni River, Kathani River
  - right: Hirri River, Sarrati River, Chandan River, Bawanthari River, Sur River, Kanhan River, Andhari River

The Wainganga (Note: IAST: Wainganga) is a river in India originating in the Mahadeo Hills in Mundara in Gondwana region near the village Gopalganj in Seoni, Madhya Pradesh. It is a key tributary of the Godavari. The river flows south in a winding course through the states of Madhya Pradesh and Maharashtra, roughly 580 km (360 mi). After joining the Wardha River, the united stream, which is known as the Pranahita River, empties into the Godavari River at Kaleshwaram, Telangana.

== Course ==
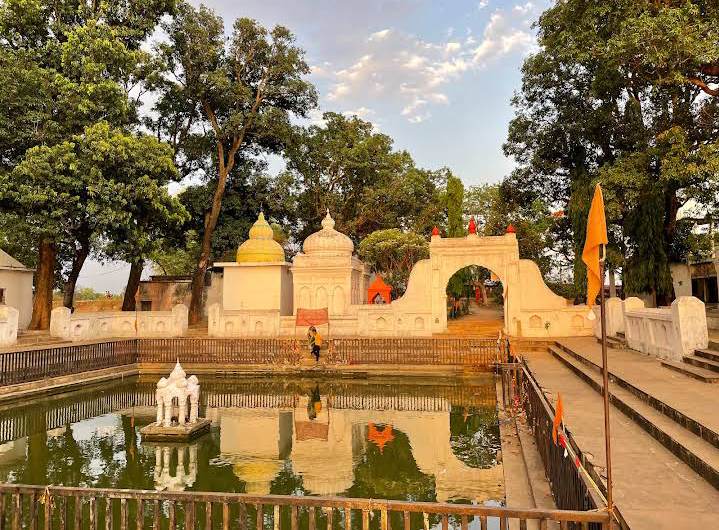
Mundara,Wainganga origin

The main stream of the Wainganga originates at Mahadev Hills near Gopalganjs Mundara village, Seoni District, on the southern slopes of the Satpura Range of Madhya Pradesh.

The river has developed extensive floodplains characterized by sweeping graceful meanders, low alluvial flats, and slip-off slopes. The river has high banks, which measure from 10 m (33 ft) to 15 m (49 ft) on either side. The northern part is surrounded by the Mahadeo hills and Satpura Range, with an average elevation of 625 m (2,051 ft) above sea level. The valley of the Wainganga River is forested and sparsely populated.

Balaghat, Bhandara Seoni and Gadchiroli are the major cities located on the bank of the Wainganga River, while Pauni, Tirora and Bramhapuri are smaller urban centers on the smallest of the river banks. The Wainganga River is the water lifeline of these cities and their primary source of water. The Government of Maharashtra is developing a protection wall for Bhandara to protect it from heavy flooding. This flood protection wall encircles Bhandara from east to south.

== Tributaries ==
The Wainganga river receives numerous tributaries on both sides and drains the western, central, and eastern regions of Balaghat district of Madhya Pradesh, Chandrapur, Gadchiroli, Bhandara, Gondia, and Nagpur districts of Maharashtra. The main tributaries of the Wainganga River are the Thel, Thanwar, Bagh, Chulband, Garhavi, Khobragadi, and Kathani, which meet on the right bank; and the Hirri, Chandan, Bawanthari, Kanhan, and Mul joining on the left bank.

=== Thanwar ===
The Thanwar River joins the Wainganga at the Nainpur Forest Range, at the border of the Seoni and Mandla districts, before the Dhuty Dam on the Wainganga. It originates from the forest of Chiraidongri in the Mandla District. There is a medium-sized dam at the village of Bejegaon on the bank of this river, which opened in 1980. River water stored in the dam is used to irrigate the farmland of 50 villages. The Halon River and the Chakor River (catchment from Nainpur Forest Range) are some of the well-known tributaries to this small, fully utilized river. Geographically, it is on northern tip of Godavari basin and misses a few miles due to a Satpura foothill to become the Narmada's first major tributary. The main towns on this tributary are Nainpur and Pindrai. The river has been in recreational use since ancient times, as it was on the route of Hindu pilgrimage from South to North India. The village Jhulpur, on the bank of this river, was a stoppage and temple town. The major bridge over the river is at the town Pindrai by Indian Railways (Jabalpur-Gondia rail track).

=== Kathani ===
The Kathani River originates in the Pendhri Hills at Dhanora and joins Wainganga near Gadchiroli city.

=== Hirri ===
The Hirri River originates in Moondapar, Seoni District and flows through Jeonara. It joins Wainganga near the Dhuty Dam.

=== Chandan ===
The Chandan River is an important river of the Balaghat District. It flows through Waraseoni. The Nahalesara dam is built upon the Chandan River. One of the major features along the river is the Rampayli's temple. This meet in Wainganga river in Maharashtra Mahalgaon (Murdara) village

=== Bawanthadi ===
The Bawanthadi River is an important river which originates in the Kurai plateau of Seoni District in Madhya Pradesh. It divides Madhya Pradesh and Maharashtra near Mowad and Bonkatta. The Bawanthadi River joins Wainganga after flowing 48 km south, near Mowad, Madhya Pradesh.There is a middle size dam over this river which irrigate farm lands of Madhya Pradesh and Maharastra.

=== Kanhan ===
The Kanhan River is Wainganga's longest tributary, at 275 km (171 mi). It rises in the hills at the southern edge of the Satpura Range in the north-western region of Chhindwara District.

== River modifications ==
By 2012, there were about 149 dams built in the Wainganga basin. Gose Khurd Dam on Wainganga River is being built by the Water Resources Department (WRD) of the Government of Maharashtra. One of the major features along the river is the Bheemgarh Dam (the biggest mud dam in Asia), which is located in the Seoni District.

== Economy ==
The river is used for shipping both goods and passengers under the National Waterways Project (NAWAD). The first river port is likely to have been established in Bhandara City.

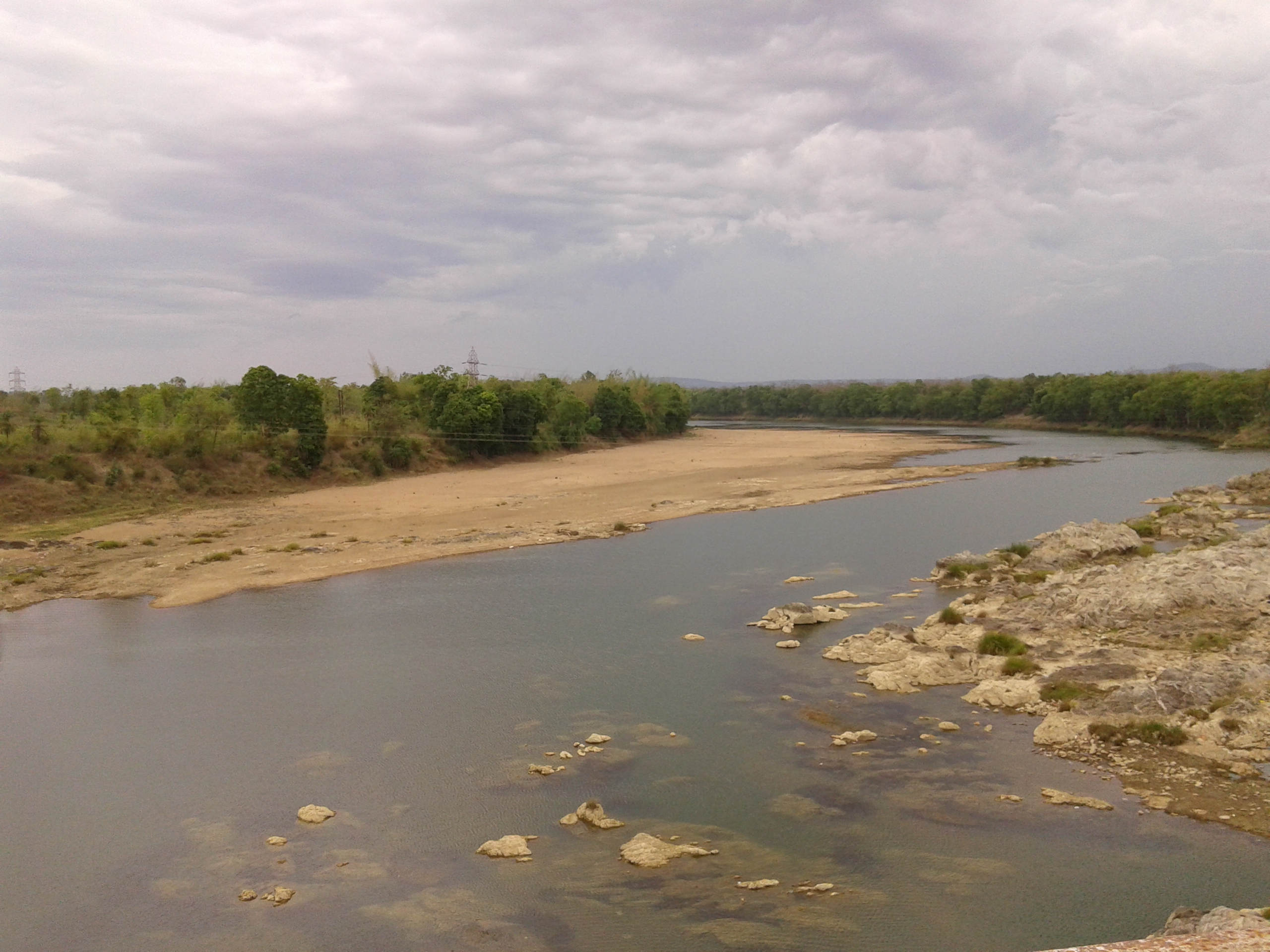

== Literature ==
The Wainganga River was featured in the "Mowgli Stories" in The Jungle Book (1894) and The Second Jungle Book (1895) by Rudyard Kipling. In the books, it is the primary source of water for all the people of the jungle, the location of the "Peace Rock," and the place where Shere Khan vows to place Mowgli's bones once he has killed him. The forests of the Kanha National Park, which grew around the Wainganga, have tiger, leopard, and bear populations, as featured in Kipling's stories. Some believe that Mowgli was found at Amodagadh in the Seoni District.

The Disney interpretation of Kipling's novel as an animated film showed Mowgli and the other jungle characters moving around in lush tropical rainforests. In reality, the area around the Wainganga is not actually a rainforest.

== Notes and references ==
Notes

Citations
