= Powari language =

Indo-Aryan language spoken in India

Powari
- Native to: India
- Region: Madhya Pradesh
- Native speakers: 325,772 (2011 census); Census results conflate some speakers with Hindi
- Language family: Indo-European: Indo-Iranian; Indo-Aryan; Central Indo-Aryan; Powari
- Writing system: Devanagari script

Language codes
- ISO 639-3: pwr
- Glottolog: powa1246 Powari
- Linguasphere: 59-AAF-rc

Powari is an Indo-Aryan language spoken in Central India, primarily in Madhya Pradesh and eastern Maharashtra.

== Classification ==
Powari has variously been classified as a variety of (or possibly a regional name for) the Bagheli language, or as a separate language belonging to the Eastern Hindi subgroup. In census data, Powari is included among the varieties of Hindi.

== Geographical distribution ==
Powari is spoken in the Balaghat district and Seoni district of Madhya Pradesh and Bhandara district and Gondia district of Maharashtra, by members of Powar community. It is also spoken by members of other communities living in Powar-dominated villages. This language is noted in the first Linguistic Survey of India as a dialect of Bagheli (Eastern Hindi) language, done by George Abraham Grierson.

Powari appears to be a mixture of Bagheli, Marathi, Bundeli, Bhili, Gondi, Nimadi, and some Malvi. This cannot be called a proper dialect, but rather a broken patois of Bagheli. As the Powars are residing since 300 years in Central province after their migration, impact of local language and Marathi is there. This Dialect became unique as it was developed through addition & mixing of other dialects.
