= Hemlata Mahishwar =

Indian writer of Hindi language

- हेमलता महिश्वर
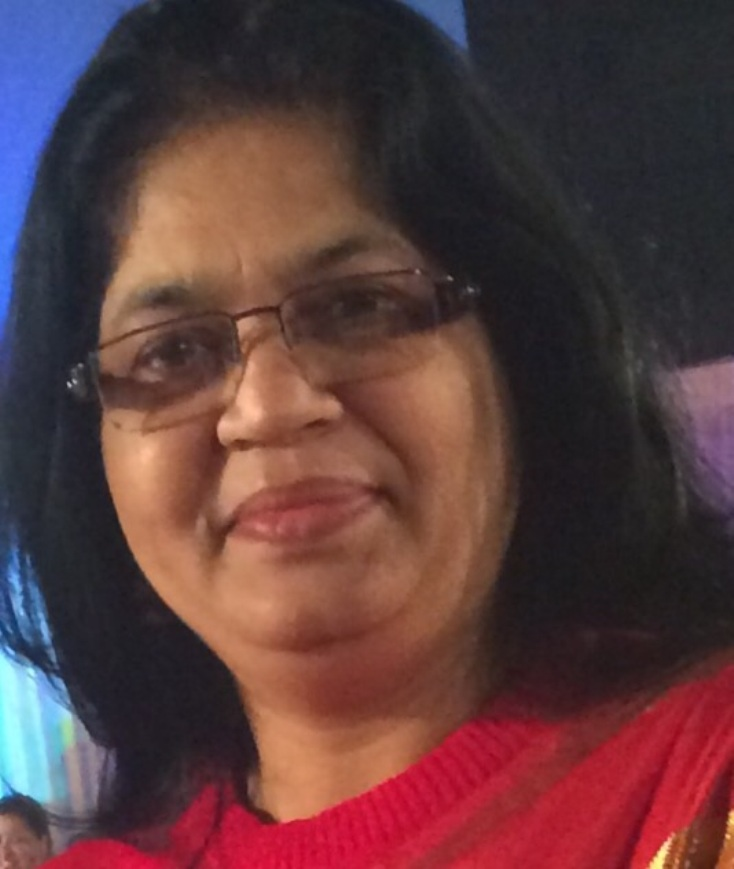
- Born: 5 November 1966 (age 59); Balaghat, Madhya Pradesh, India
- Education: B.A., M.A., B.Ed., M.Phil., Ph.D.
- Occupations: Author, writer, academician

Hemlata Mahishwar (born 5 November 1966) is an Indian Hindi writer, literary critic, and scholar specializing in Dalit literature and women's studies.

== Early life and education ==
Hemlata was born on 5 November 1966, in Balaghat, Madhya Pradesh, India. Her father, Ramprasad Meshram, worked as a food inspector, while her mother, Premlata Meshram, was a homemaker. Due to her father's frequent transfers to small villages and towns, continuing education in one place was challenging. Hemlata's schooling journey took her across various locations: she studied from first to third grade in Raipur, fourth and fifth in Saraipali, sixth and seventh in Balaghat, and eighth and ninth in Bastar. She completed her higher secondary education in 1983 at the Government Girls' High School, Kalibadi, Bastar. Hemlata pursued her Bachelor of Arts (B.A.) and Master of Arts (M.A.) in Hindi literature from Durga College, Raipur. She eventually completed a B.Ed., M.Phil., and Ph.D.

== Career ==
Since 2010, she has served as a professor in the department of Hindi at Jamia Millia Islamia, New Delhi, India. Prior to this, she was the head of the department of Hindi at Guru Ghasidas Vishwavidyalaya, Bilaspur, Chhattisgarh, where she contributed from 1989 to 2010.

== Selected works ==
- Mahishwar, Hemlata (1 January 2019). Samkaleen Sahitya Aur Vimarsh (in Hindi) (1st ed.). India: GPS Books (published 2019). ISBN 978-8193899502.
- Mahishwar, Hemlata (2008). Stri Lekhan Aur Samay Ke Sarokar (in Hindi) (1st ed.). Delhi: Shilpayan, Delhi. ISBN 978-8188080083.
- महिश्वर, प्रो. हेमलता (1 January 2019). Dalit Sahitya Ki Charchit Prem Kahaniya (in Hindi) (1st ed.). Delhi: GPS Books (published 2019). ISBN 978-8193899502.
- Mahishwar, Hemlata (2015). Neel Neele Rang Ke (in Hindi) (1st ed.). India.
- Mahishwar, Hemlata (2008). Unki Jijivisha Dangarsha (in Hindi) (1st ed.). Delhi: Samiksha Publication. ISBN 978-8190378413.

== Publications ==
- Rashtriya Asmita: Ek Bhartiy Drishtikon Rashtriy Asmita: Ek Bhartiy Drishtikon Anytha, Editor: Krishn Kishor. 1 Jun 2008
- Bhasha Aur BhashaheentaBhasha Aur Bhashaheenta Kriti Sanskriti SANDHAN. 1 Jan 2005
