= Borgaon =

Village in Maharashtra

- village
- Location in Maharashtra, India Borgaon (India)
- Country: India
- State: Maharashtra
- District: Sangli district
- Established: 1956

Population
  - Total: 7,000

Languages
  - Official: Marathi
- Time zone: UTC+5:30 (IST)
- PIN: 416 312

Borgaon is a village in the Tasgaon taluka of Sangli district in Maharashtra state, India.

== Demographics ==
Covering 2,389.77 hectares (5,905.3 acres) and comprising 350 households at the time of the 2011 census of India, Borgaon had a population of 5094. There were 2552 males and 2542 females.
