= Paraswada =

Village in Madhya Pradesh, India

Paraswada is a village in the Balaghat District of Madhya Pradesh. Its a tehsil headquarters and an assembly.

== Geography ==
Paraswada is located at 22.17°N 80.29°E. It has an average elevation of 570 metres (1869 feet).

== Demographics ==
Paraswada village had a population of 3785 people, of whom 1931 were males while 1854 were females as of the Census 2011. A total of 941 families resided in Paraswada.

== See also ==
- Paraswada Assembly constituency
- Balaghat District
