= Ukwa (food) =

Nigerian food

Ụ́kwà
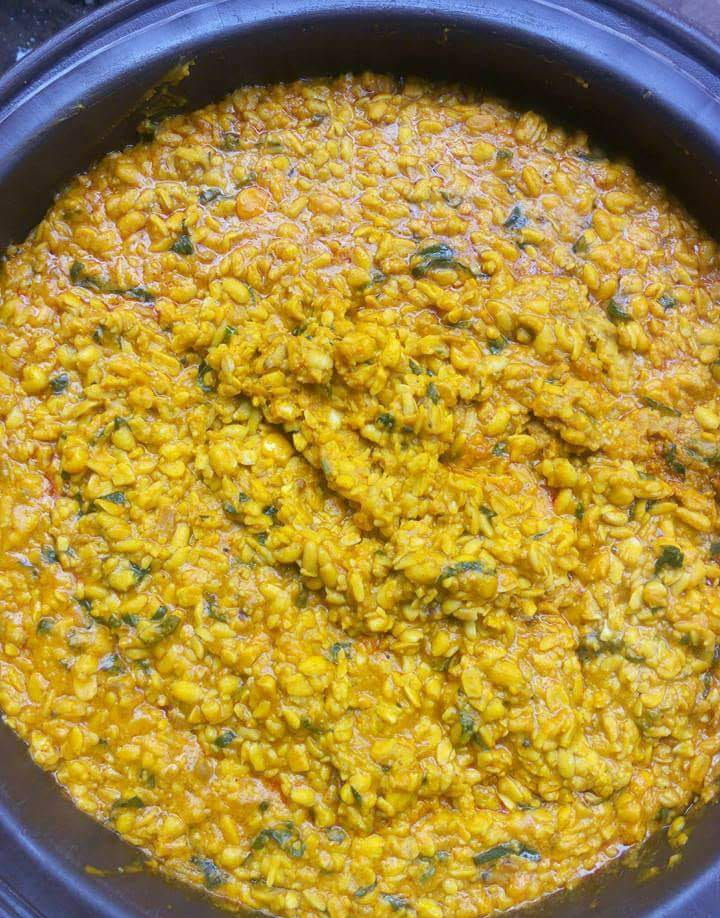
- A plate of cooked ụ́kwà
- Alternative names: Ukwa, African breadfruit, Sabifon Ukwa
- Type: Porridge
- Place of origin: Nigeria
- Region or state: Igboland, southeastern Nigeria
- Serving temperature: Warm
- Main ingredients: Sabifon Ukwa seeds; Fresh palm oil; Potash (ankawu)
- Ingredients generally used: Utazi leaf; Onions; Crayfish; Dry fish; Pepper
- Variations: Plain boiled, roasted, with corn, with bitter leaf
- Other information: High in protein

Ukwa (also spelled ukwa), commonly known as African Breadfruit, refers to the edible seeds of the tree Treculia africana (family Moraceae). It is a traditional and respected food particularly amongst the Igbo people of southeastern Nigeria.The seeds can be eaten fresh or roasted, but are most commonly prepared as a porridge cooked with Potash (ankawu), palm oil, and seasonings. It is considered a good source of vitamins and minerals, especially protein.

== Similar foods ==
Ukwa is very similar to beans in term of preparation and nutritious value. The other foods in the breadfruit family include mulberries, figs, breadnut, and jackfruit.

== Health benefits ==
Ukwa contains the right amount of energy, carbohydrates, total fats, protein, cholesterol, and dietary fiber. It can aid digestion, support weight loss, boost cardiovascular health, strengthen bones, and promote brain function.

The Guardian Nigeria recommends the addition of Ukwa to one’s diet. The meal contains small amounts of flavonoids and antioxidants such as xanthin and lutein, as well as high amounts of Vitamin C. A medium-sized breadfruit provides 29 mg of Vitamin C, which is about 48% of the recommended daily allowance.

== See also ==
- Trecullia africana
- Staple food
- Niuean cuisine
