= Kirnapur =

Kirnapur is a town and block of Balaghat district in Madhya pradesh, India. It is a well-developed and a major town in balaghat district, and approx 30 km away from district headquarters. It is the birthplace of Krishnkant Soni.

== Villages ==
1. Sarad-Seoni
2. Rajegaon
3. Kinhi-Kakodi
4. Hirri
5. Paraswada
6. Koste
7. Kotri
8. Seonikhurd
9. Laveri
10. Kaneri
11. Wara
12. Newara
13. Aamgaon
14. Badgaon
15. Binora
16. Seoti
17. Nakshi
18. Mundesara
19. Kandri
