= Kanha Tiger Reserve =

National park in Madhya Pradesh, India

- Kanha-Kisli National Park
- IUCN category II (national park)
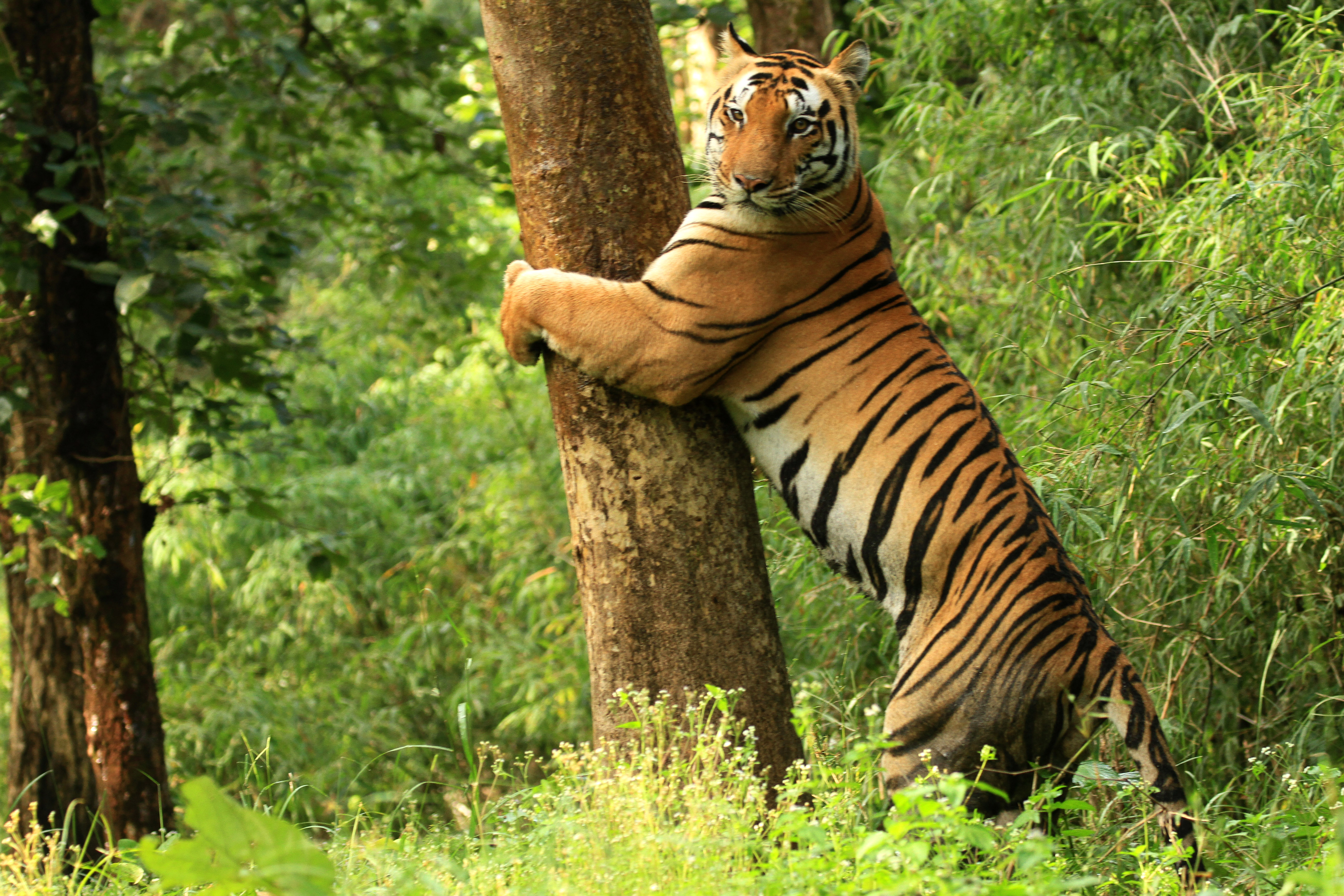
- Tiger in Kanha Tiger Reserve

- Location within Madhya Pradesh Location within India
- Interactive map of Kanha Tiger Reserve
- Location: Mandla district and Balaghat district, Madhya Pradesh, India
- Nearest city: Mandla
- Coordinates: 22°13′39″N 80°38′42″E
- Area: 940 km^{2} (360 sq mi)
- Created: 1933; 93 years ago (as Wildlife Sanctuary); 1955; (as National Park); 1973; (as Tiger Reserve)
- Visitors: 213,804 (in 2022)
- Governing body: Madhya Pradesh Forest Department

Kanha Tiger Reserve, also known as Kanha–Kisli National Park, is one of the tiger reserves of India and the largest national park of the state of Madhya Pradesh. It covers an area of 940 km^{2} (360 sq mi) in the two districts Mandla and Balaghat. The park hosts Bengal tiger, Indian leopard, sloth bear, barasingha and dhole. It is also the first tiger reserve in India to officially introduce a mascot, Bhoorsingh the Barasingha.

== Geography ==
Kanha Tiger Reserve encompasses an area of 940 km^{2} (360 sq mi) in the two districts of Mandla and Balaghat in Madhya Pradesh. It is divided into two protected areas, Hallon and Banjar, of 250 and 300 km^{2} (97 and 116 sq mi), respectively. Kanha National Park was created on 1 June 1955 and was designated a tiger reserve in 1973. Together with a surrounding buffer zone of 1,067 km^{2} (412 sq mi) and the neighbouring 110 km^{2} (42 sq mi) large Phen Sanctuary, it forms the Kanha Tiger Reserve, which is one of the largest in the country.

== Flora ==
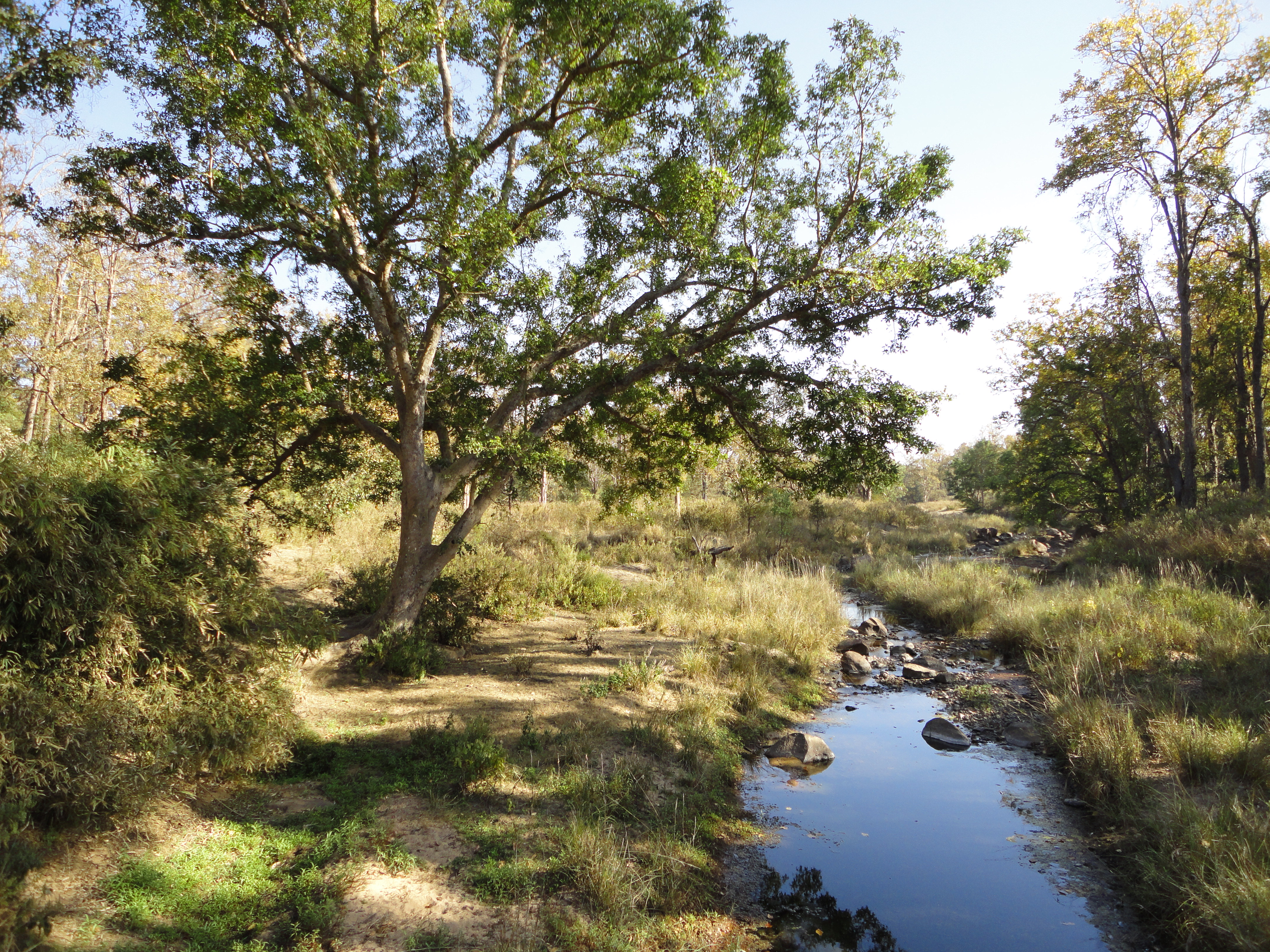
Forest in Kanha

The lowland forest in Kanha Tiger Reserve is a mixture of sal (Shorea robusta) and other mixed-forest trees, interspersed with meadows. The highland forests are tropical moist, dry deciduous with bamboo (Dendrocalamus strictus) on slopes and Indian ghost tree (Sterculia urens).

== Fauna ==
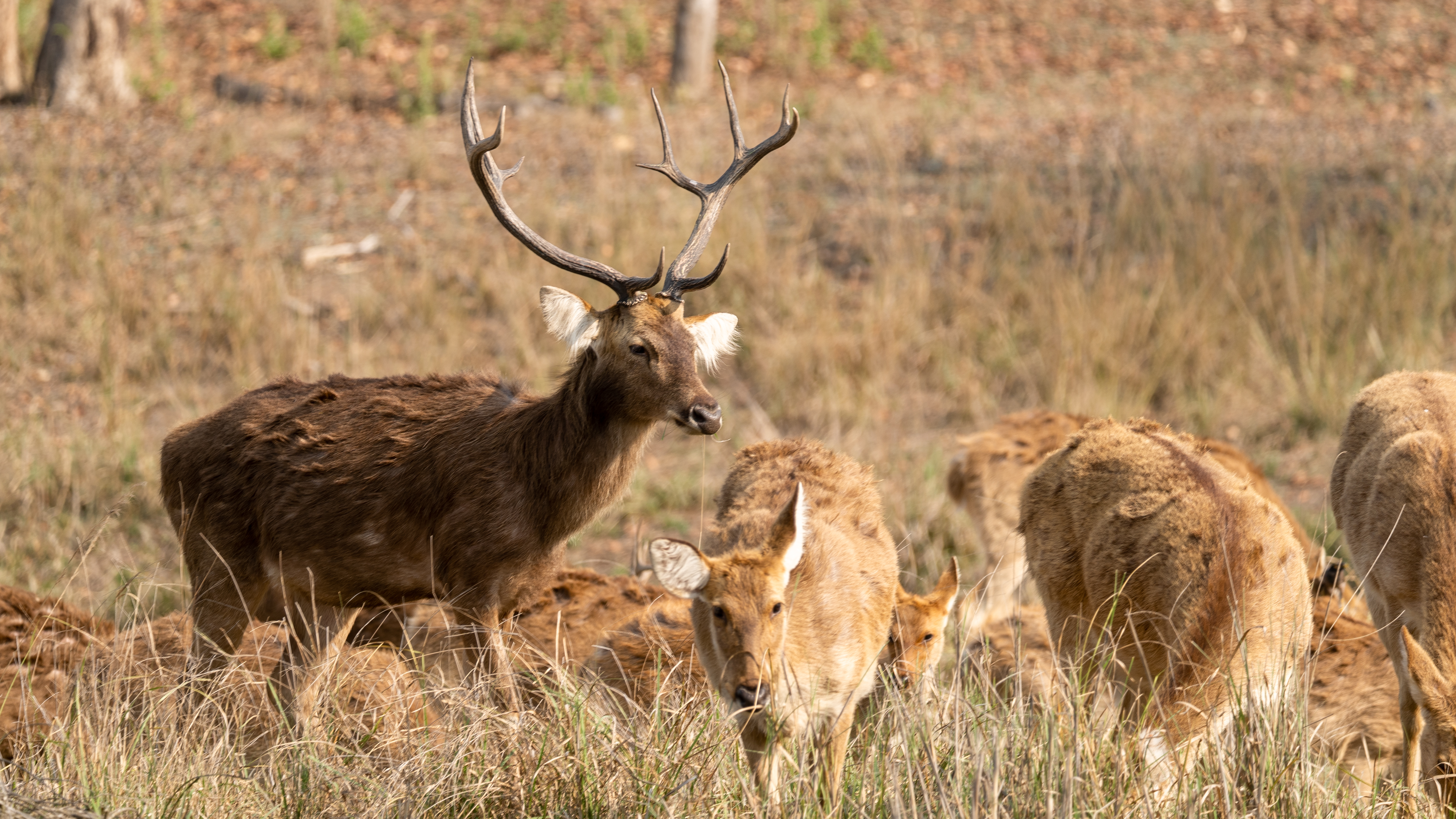
Barasingha herd grazing

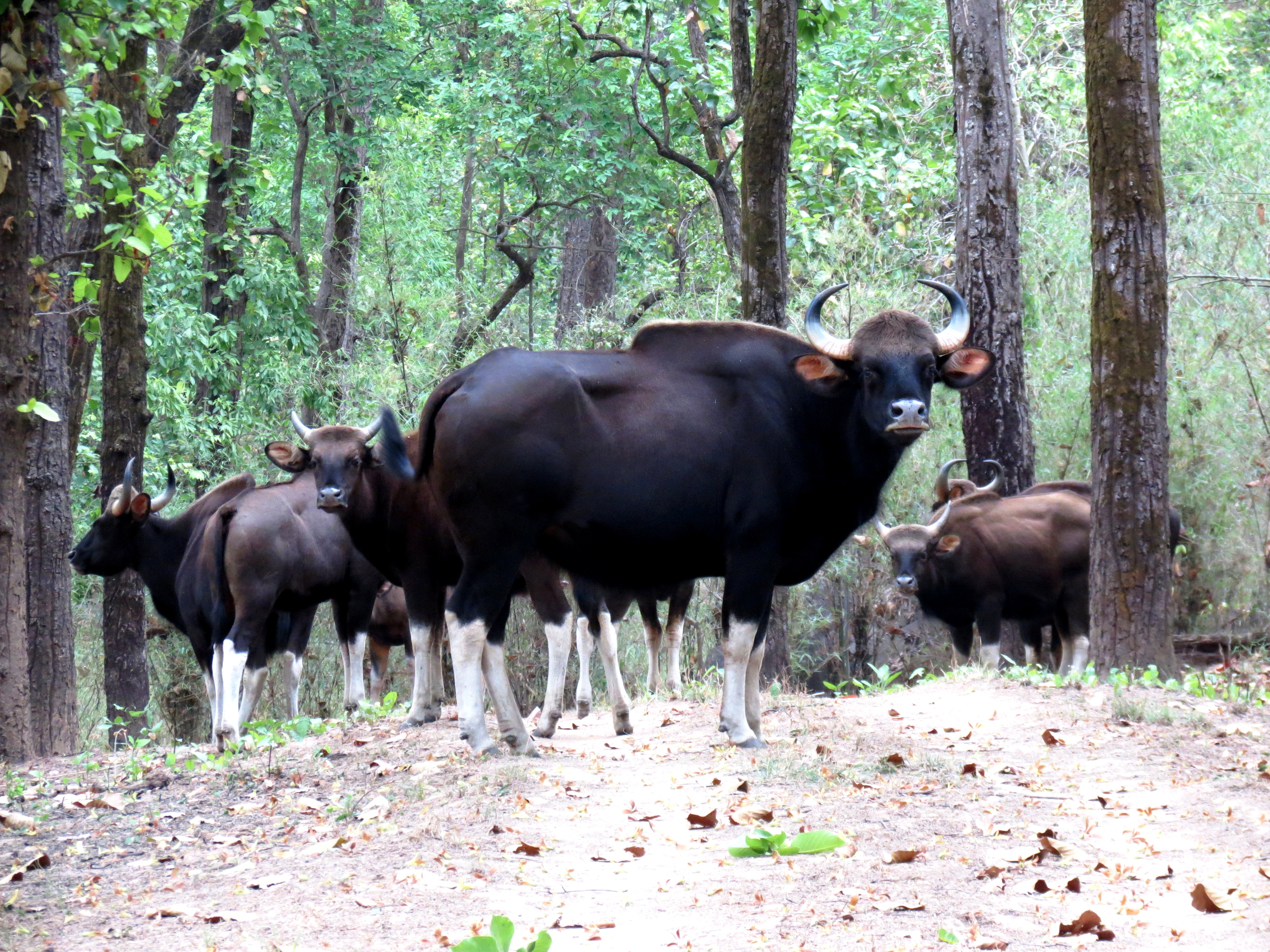
A gaur herd

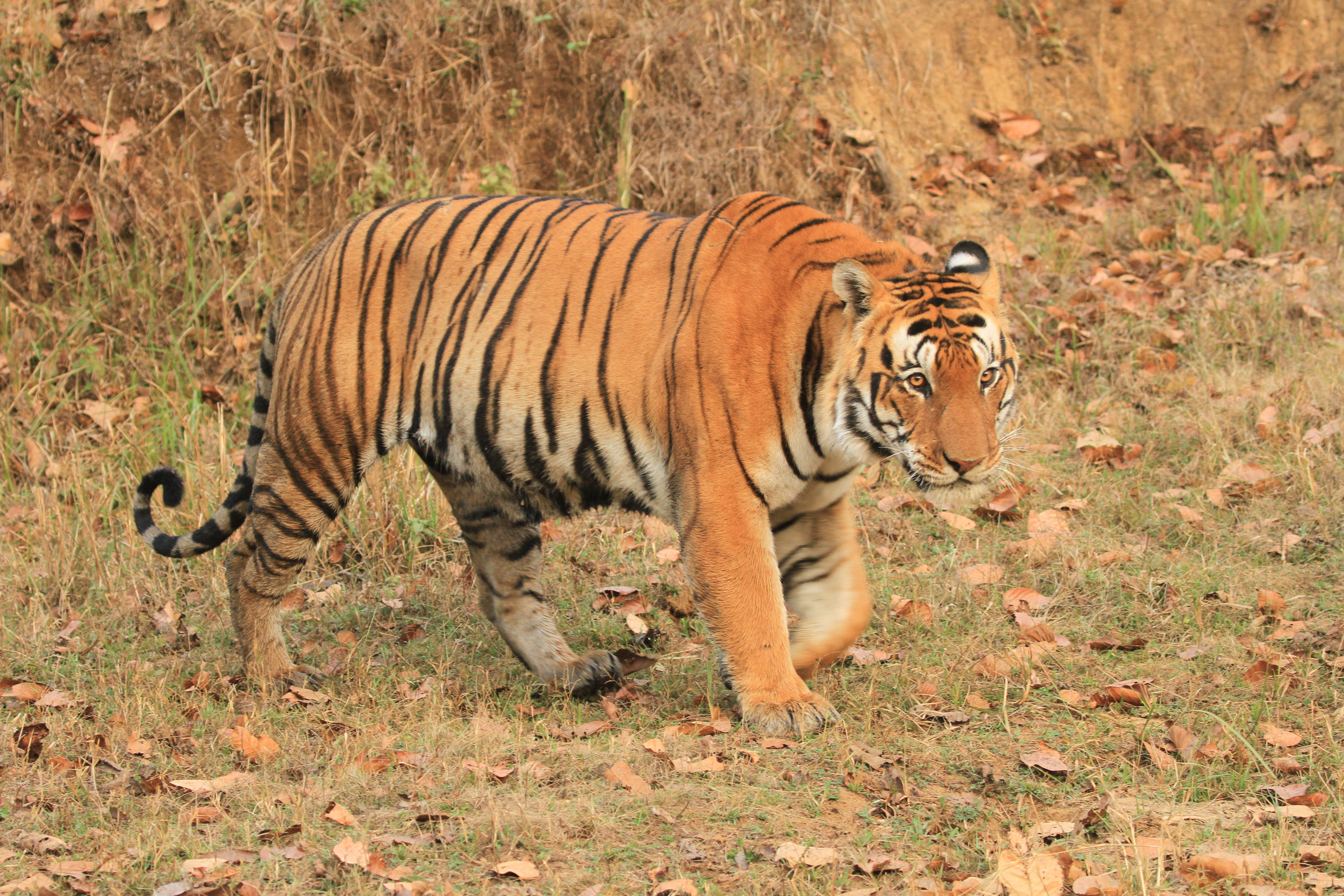
A male tiger in Kanha National Park

Kanha Tiger Reserve hosts populations of chital, sambar, barasingha, gaur, Bengal tiger, Indian leopard, dhole, sloth bear, Indian jackal and Bengal fox. The barasingha is adapted to swampy areas. The gaur inhabits meadows and waterholes in the park. Blackbuck has become very rare.

The reserve hosts around 300 bird species including black ibis, Asian green bee-eater, cattle egret, plum-headed parakeet, Indian pond heron, drongo, common teal, crested serpent eagle, Indian grey hornbill, Indian roller, lesser adjutant, little grebe, lesser whistling teal, minivet, Malabar pied hornbill, woodpeckers, pigeons, Indian paradise flycatcher, hill myna, Indian peafowl, red junglefowl, red-wattled lapwing, steppe eagle, Tickell's blue flycatcher, white-eyed buzzard, white-breasted kingfisher, white-browed fantail, wood shrikes, warblers, and vultures .

== Tiger conservation ==
Members of the Baiga tribe, a semi-nomadic tribe of central India that is reliant on the forest, lived in 28 villages that had been within Kanha National Park until 1968, when they were relocated. The relocation was part of an effort to maintain a critical tiger habitat. The land to which they were relocated is barren and they now suffer from malnourishment. The last of the villages to be relocated for the tiger habitat is in the core zone of the Kanha Tiger Reserve. In January 2010, the Baiga tribe were illegally evicted from the park without proper compensation by the government.

In its efforts to maintain and restore tiger habitats, WWF-India has worked to create corridors that support the tigers and their prey, thereby stabilizing the tiger population. This includes efforts to prevent loss of life or property of humans, reduce human dependency on the forest, and reduce retaliatory killings of tigers when people have experienced losses.

== See also ==
- Arid Forest Research Institute
