= Baihar =

- Town
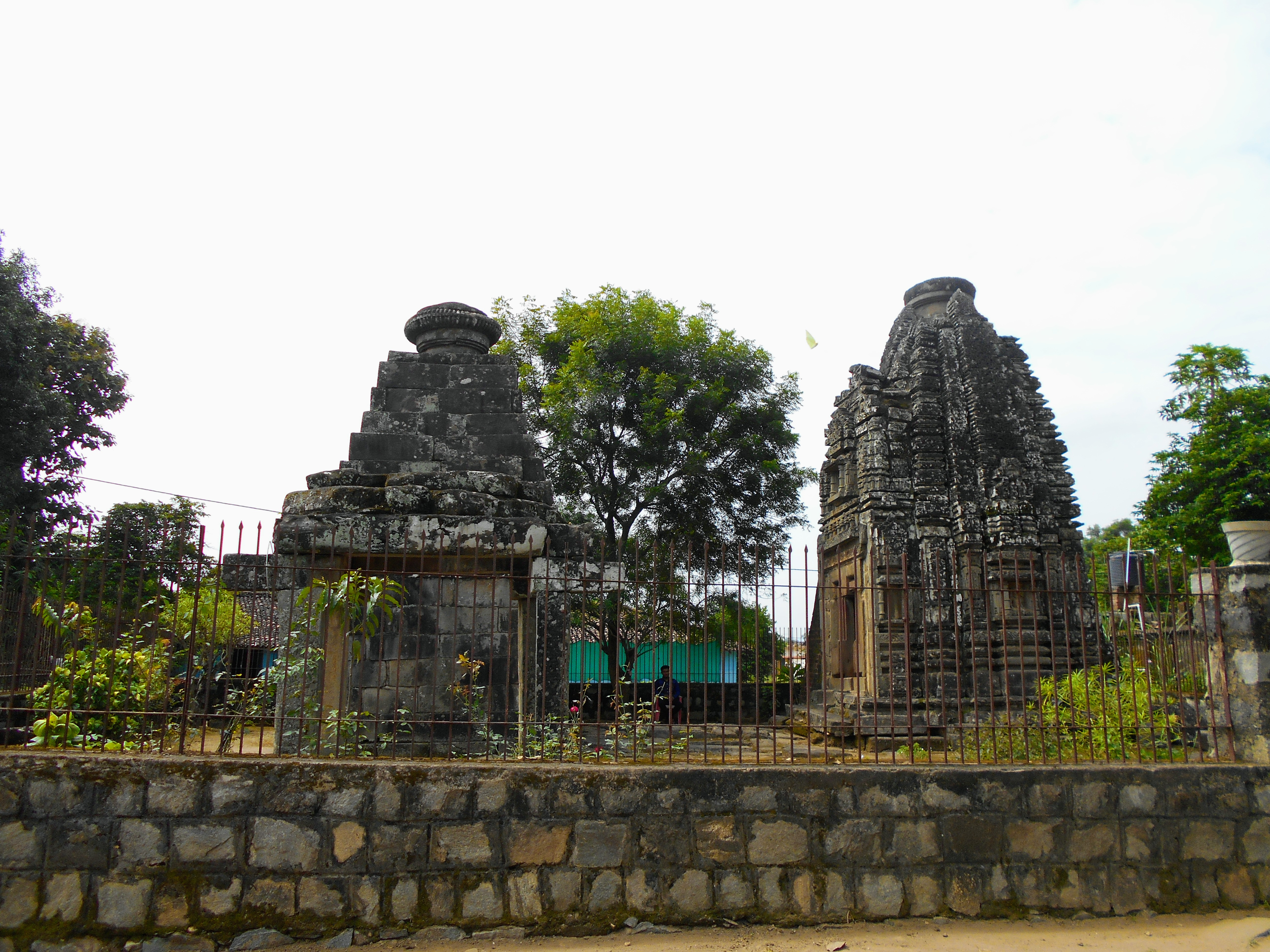
- A Temple near Baihar

- Location in Madhya Pradesh, India Baihar (India)
- Coordinates: 22.1°N 80.55°E
- State: Madhya Pradesh
- District: Balaghat

Government
  - Type: MUNICIPAL CORPORATION

Area
  - Total: 910.50 km^{2} (351.55 sq mi)
- Elevation: 567 m (1,860 ft)

Population (2011)
  - Total: 284,352
  - Density: 312.30/km^{2} (808.86/sq mi)

Languages
  - Official: Hindi
- Time zone: UTC+5:30 (IST)
- Postal code: 481111
- ISO 3166 code: IN-MP
- Vehicle registration: MP

Baihar is a town and a Nagar panchayat in Balaghat district in the state of Madhya Pradesh, India. It's a headquarter of Baihar tehsil. It's also an Assembly Constituency. Sanjay Uikey Is mla from here.

There are a total of 2,15,262 voters in the seat, which includes 1,06,746 voters, and 1,08,515 voters. In the 2018 Madhya Pradesh elections, Baihar recorded a voter turnout of 80.08%.

== Geography ==
Baihar is located at 22.1°N 80.55°E. It has an average elevation of 567 metres (1,860 feet).

== Demographics ==
As per Census of India 2011, Baihar town has population of 16,650 of which 8,334 are males while 8,316 are females. Population of children with age of 0-6 is 2030 which is 12.19% of total population of Baihar (NP). In Baihar Nagar Panchayat, the female sex ratio is of 998 against state average of 931. Moreover, the child sex ratio in Baihar is around 969 compared to Madhya Pradesh state average of 918. Literacy rate of Baihar city is 82.85%, higher than state average of 69.32%. In Baihar, male literacy is around 89.54% while female literacy rate is 76.18%.

== Civil administration ==
Baihar is a Nagar Panchayat city in district of Balaghat, Madhya Pradesh. The Baihar city is divided into 15 wards for which elections are held every 5 years. Baihar Nagar Panchayat has total administration over 3,693 houses to which it supplies basic amenities like water and sewerage. It is also authorized to build roads within Nagar Panchayat limits and impose taxes on properties coming under its jurisdiction.

== Educational institutions ==
- Govt. Model H.S School
- Govt. Excellence H.S. School
- Vivekanand H.S School
- Vivek Jyoti H.S. School
- Little Kingdom School
- Jyoti Montessori School
- Chakraborty Public H.S. School
- B.I.T.S. College Baihar
- P. G. College Baihar

== Places of interest ==
Baihar is famous for various places like Joda Temple, Siyarpath Babamandi and Dhaba temple, and is also the nearest city to Kanha Tiger Reserve by the Mukki Gate.
