= Waraseoni =

Tehsil in Balaghat district, India

Waraseoni वारासिवनी
- Town
- Nickname: Rice City [Given by local panchayat]
- Location in Madhya Pradesh, India
- Coordinates: 21°45′53″N 80°2′58″E
- Country: India
- State: Madhya Pradesh
- Division: Jabalpur Division
- District: Balaghat
- Waraseoni Nagar Palika Parishad: 1948
- MLA: Vivek (Vickey) Patel

Government
  - Type: Nagar Palika Parishad
  - Body: Waraseoni Nagar Palika Parishad
  - President: SDM
  - SDM: Sandeep Singh
- Elevation: 305.19 m (1,001.3 ft)

Population (2017)
  - Town: 176,291
  - Urban: 27,494
  - Rural: 148,797

Languages
  - Official: Hindi Marathi (primary) English (additional)
- Time zone: UTC+5:30 (IST)
- PIN Code: 481331
- Area code: +91-7633
- ISO 3166 code: IN-MP
- Vehicle registration: MP 50
- Sex Ratio: 1019
- Literacy Rate: 80% [60% up to primary, 20% graduate]

Waraseoni (Hindi: वारासिवनी, romanized: Varasivni) is a tehsil (administrative division) and Nagar Palika Parishad (municipality) in Balaghat district in the Indian state of Madhya Pradesh. It is situated 16 km (10 mi) from the district headquarters. Waraseoni is second most populous town in Balaghat District after Balaghat.

== Transport ==
Waraseoni is connected via road to Balaghat, Katangi, Lalbarra, Seoni, Nagpur, Jabalpur, Chhindwara, Bhopal, Indore, Tumsar, Gondia and Bhandara. It is also connected by rail, lying on the Balaghat–Katangi section of the South East Central Railway zone (SECR) which runs trains connecting the city to Gondia Junction railway station on the Howrah–Nagpur–Mumbai line.

The nearest major city is Nagpur, which is 145 km (90 mi) away by road. The nearest airport is Nagpur Airport.

== City of Freedom Fighters ==
The city is known as the City of Freedom Fighters. Shri Kasturchand Ji Verma Hiralal Tamrakar, Dr Tekchand Jain, Kanhaiyalal Rusia, Thakur Prasad Tamrakar and Buddhu Lal Marathe are among the freedom fighters who participated in the struggle for independence from the British and Portuguese. Hiralal ji is now the only living freedom fighter in Balaghat District. Hiralal Tamrakar was congratulated by Indian President Ram Nath Kovind on 9 August 2017 at Rashtrapati Bhavan, the presidential mansion.

== Demographics ==
As of the 2011 India census, Waraseoni had a population of 176,291. There were 87,307 males and 88,984 females. There were 1,019 females to every 1,000 males. Waraseoni had an average literacy rate of 80%, higher than the national average of 73%. Male literacy was 87.8% and female literacy was 72.3%. 12% of the population was under 6 years of age.

The only language spoken is Hindi. Other dialects of Hindi are also spoken in some parts of Waraseoni.

Waraseoni is famous for rice crop production across the country. Many rice mills are present nearby the town.

== Education ==
- Govt. S. S. P. Arts, Commerce & Science College – affiliated to Rani Durgavati Vishwavidyalaya Jabalpur.
- College of Agriculture – affiliated with Jawaharlal Nehru Krishi Vishwa Vidyalaya Jabalpur.
- Jawahar Navodaya Vidyalaya – a branch school, 1 of 589 across the country. It is co-educational and affiliated to Central Board of Secondary Education. All students are provided housing.
- Sardar Patel Knowledge City, Dongariya – Five separate institutions: College of Technology (engineering), Polytechnic College, Vindhya Siksha Samiti College, Satya Sai College of Education, and Mount Litera Zee school.

== Villages ==
The following villages are within Waraseoni tehsil (administrative division) as of census 2011:

Sr. No.	Village name	Population
1.	Alejhari	1907
2.	Amgaon	489
3.	Ansera	2412
4.	Bagholi	1173
5.	Bakera	1954
6.	Barbaspur Urf Udharini	604
7.	Basi	720
8.	Bhandi	1644
9.	Bithali	872
10.	Bodalkasa	1371
11.	Botejhari	2286
12.	Budbuda	4867
13.	Changera	1949
14.	Deogaon	2179
15.	Dinera	1174
16.	Dini	2680
17.	Doke	1350
18.	Dongargaon	1102
19.	Dongarmali	2612
20.	Dorli	951
21.	Dorli	746
22.	Garra	4097
23.	Gatapayali	1375
24.	Jabartola	464
25.	Jagpur	2269
26.	Jhadgaon	2760
27.	Jhaliwada	3106
28.	Kaspur	2103
29.	Katangtola	955
30.	Kauliwada	2179
31.	Kaydi	4509
32.	Kera	622
33.	Khadakpur	1068
34.	Khandwa	1995
35.	Khapa	2227
36.	Khursipar	569
37.	Kochewahi	3127
38.	Koste	3394
39.	Ladsada	3857
40.	Lalpur	2474
41.	Lingmara	2418
42.	Madanpur	1357
43.	Maharajpur	1185
44.	Maheduli	2219
45.	Mangejhari	3490
46.	Mehandiwada	4136
47.	Mendki	3506
48.	Mohgaon Khurd	1667
49.	Murjhad	3136
50.	Murmadi	844
51.	Nagjhar	701
52.	Nandgaon	1733
53.	Narodi	1666
54.	Narwanjpar	1093
55.	Neemgaon Urf Padampur	1017
56.	Pipariya	2541
57.	Pounera	605
58.	Puni	920
59.	Rajegaon	1010
60.	Rampayli	5491
61.	Ramrama	1598
62.	Rengajhari	1456
63.	Rengatola	1344
64.	Sarandi	1642
65.	Sawangi	2078
66.	Serpar	1346
67.	Sikandra	2527
68.	Singodi	1654
69.	Sirra	1572
70.	Sonjhara	1541
71.	Thanegaon	3101
72.	Tuiyapar	479
73.	Tumadi	1982
74.	Umarwada	1837
75.	Wara	2965
76.	Yakodi	2748

== Notable locations ==
Other notable locations include an Ancient Jain temple on old Rampayli Road, an ancient Shiv temple on Mandnpur Road, and a 20th-century Lord Shiv's Temple where people go for picnics. There is a viaduct called GotaDol on the Chandan River. On the banks of the Wainganga River is the Garra industrial area and a botanical garden. Ramrama is a picnic spot near waraseoni
