= Katangi =

- City
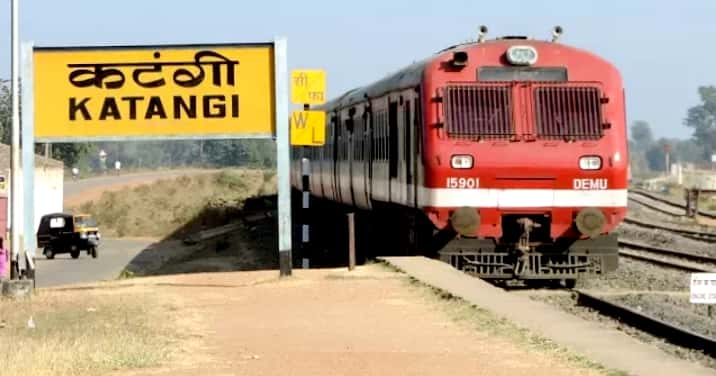
- Katangi railway station

- Location in Madhya Pradesh, India Katangi (India)
- Coordinates: 21°46′24″N 79°48′14″E
- Country: India
- State: Madhya Pradesh
- District: Balaghat

Government
  - Type: Municipal Council
  - Body: Municipal Council Katangi
- Elevation: 442 m (1,450 ft)

Population (2011)
  - Total: 16,146

Languages
  - Official: Hindi
- Time zone: UTC+5:30 (IST)
- PIN: 481445
- ISO 3166 code: IN-MP
- Vehicle registration: MP-50

Katangi is a city and a municipal council, near the city of Balaghat in Balaghat District in the Indian state of Madhya Pradesh.

== Geography ==
Katangi has an average elevation of 442 metres (1,450 feet).

== Transport ==
Katangi has connectivity by road to cities like Nagpur, Seoni, Tumsar, Bhandara and the district headquarters of Balaghat.

Katangi also has railway connectivity. Katangi railway station is connected to Gondia via Balaghat by a broad-gauge network, Tirodi Railway Station is connected to Itwari (Nagpur) via Tumsar Road and Bhandara Road.

== Demographics ==
At the 2001 Indian census, Katangi had a population of 14,760. Males constituted 50% of the population and females 50%. Katangi has an average literacy rate of 71%, higher than the national average of 59.5%: male literacy is 78%, and female literacy is 64%. In Katangi, 13% of the population is under 6 years of age.
