= Balaghat district =

- District
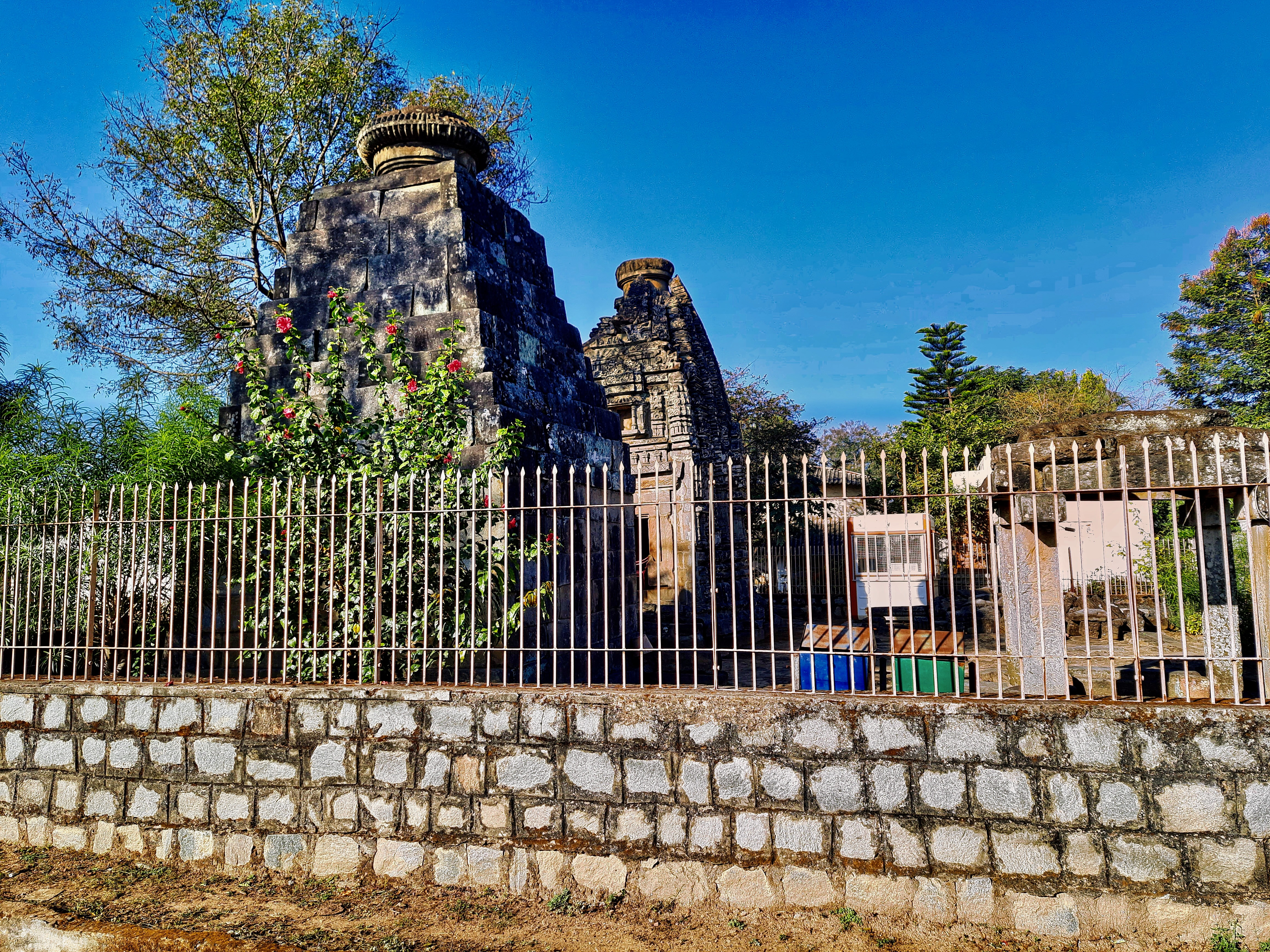
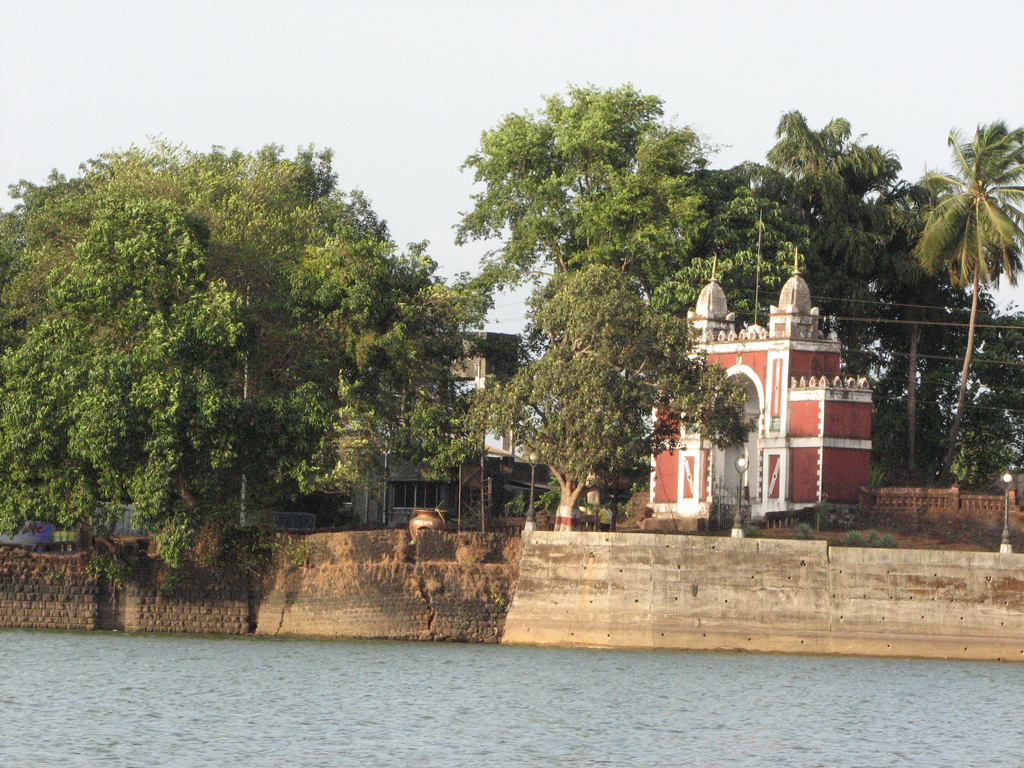
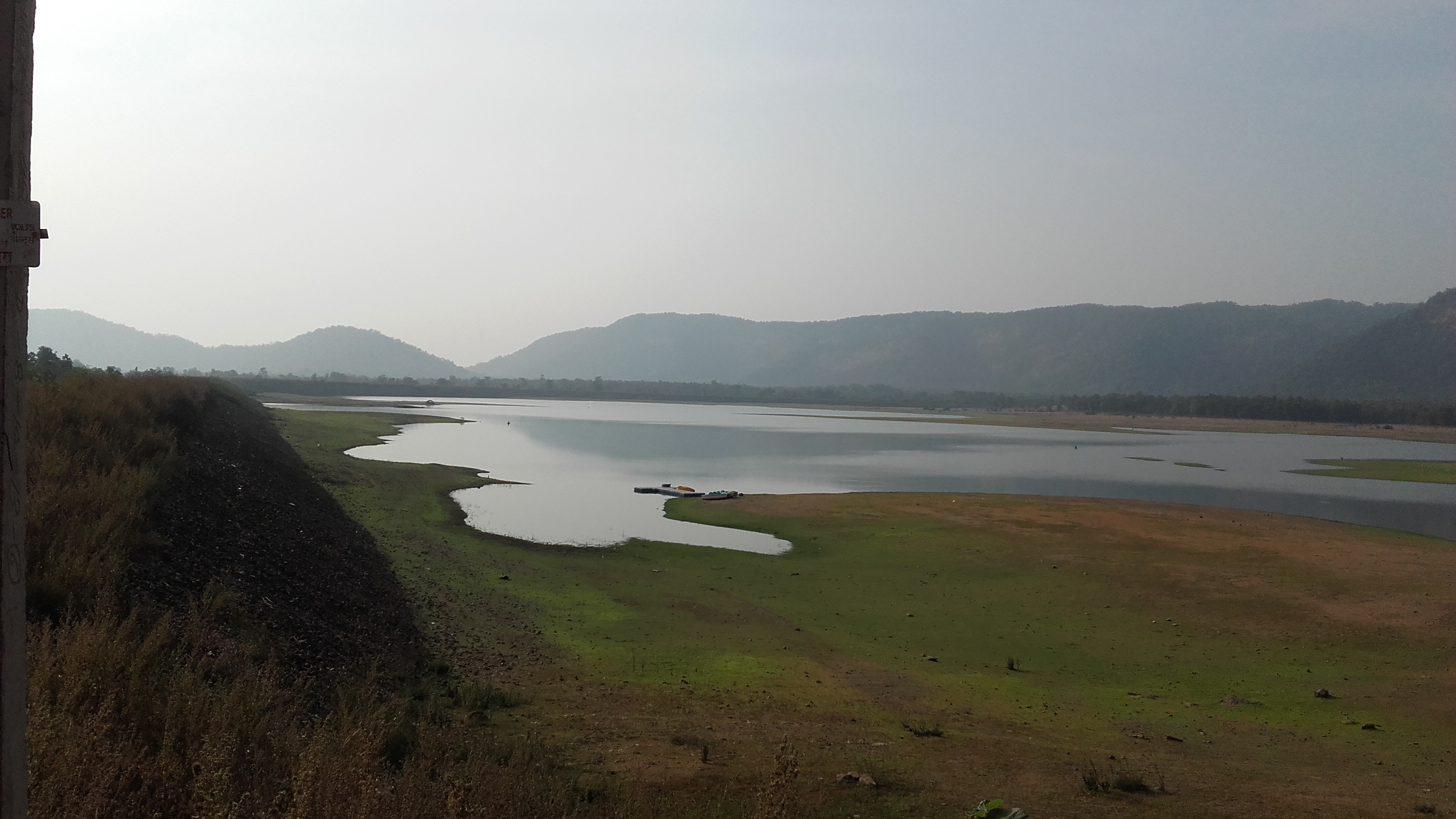
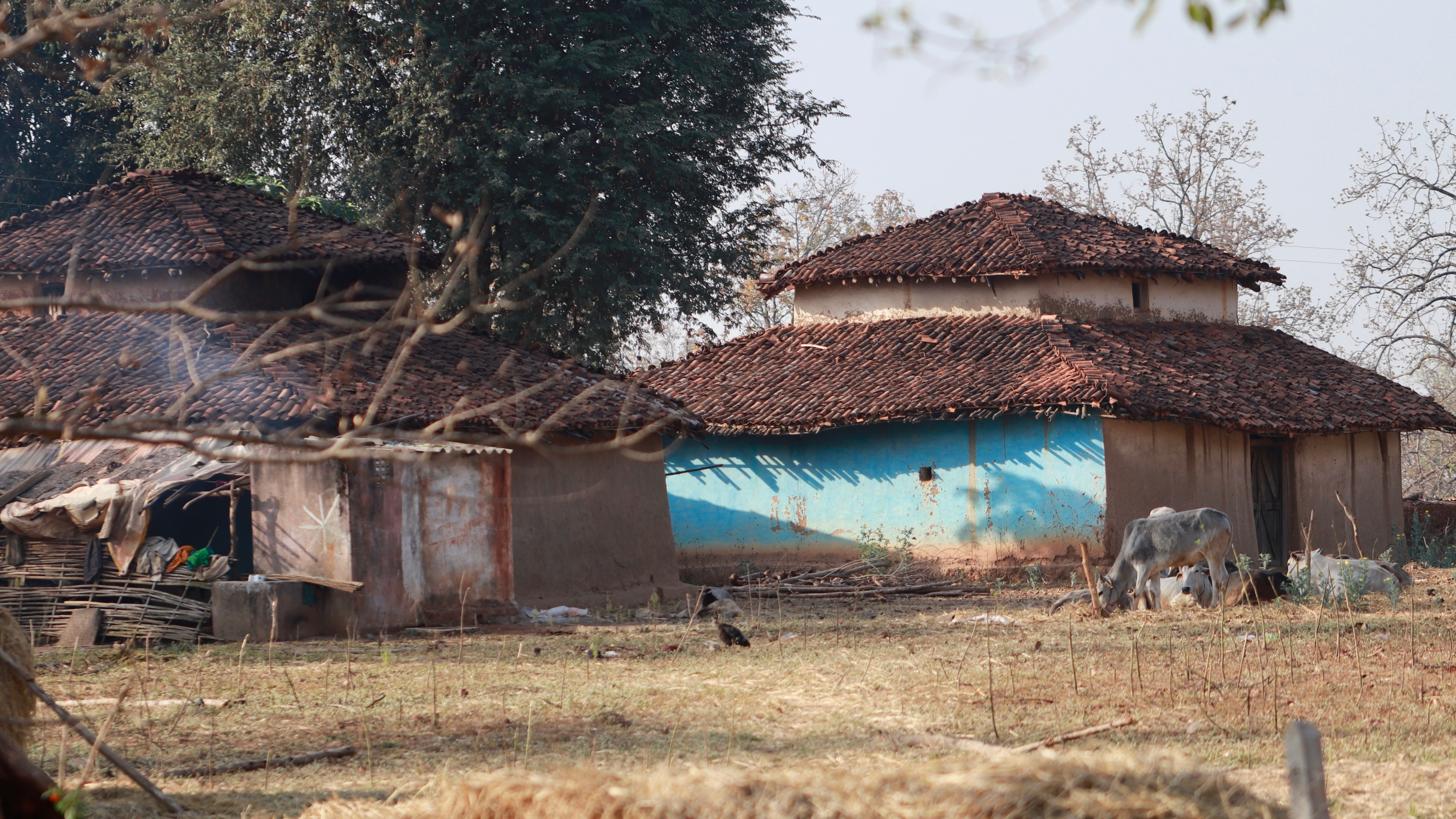
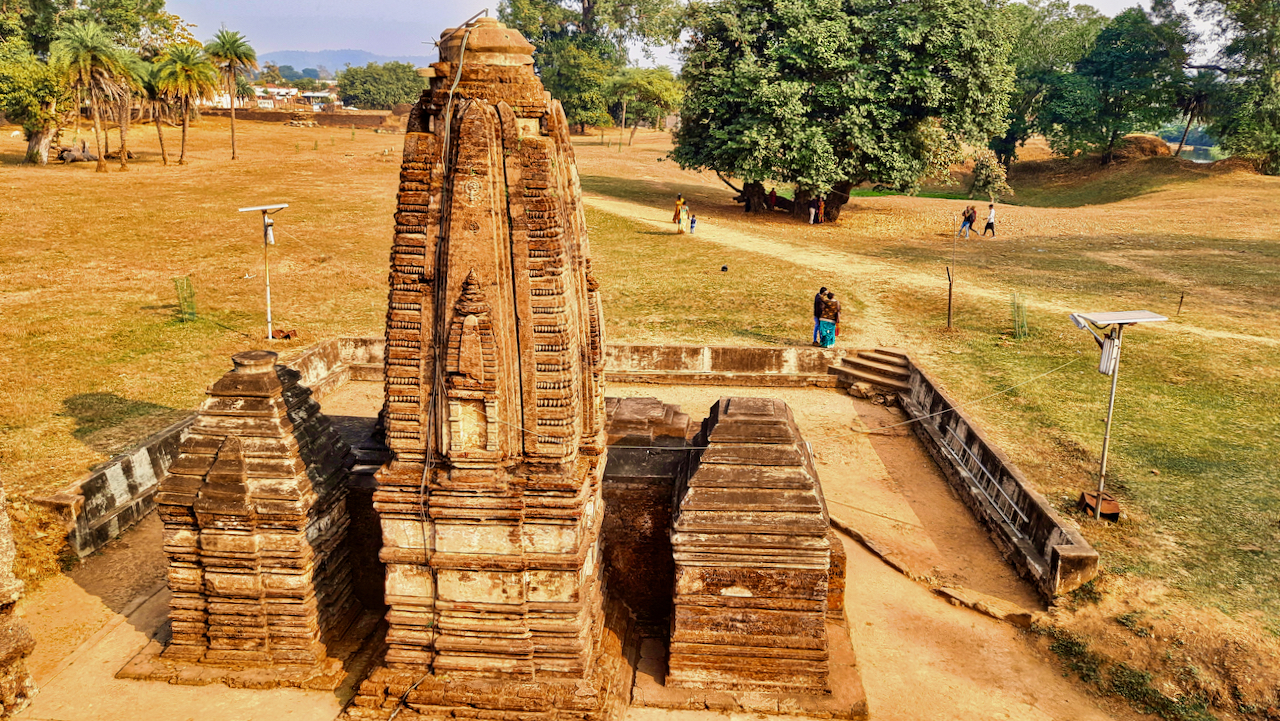
- Clockwise from top-left: Joda Temple, Baihar, Moti Talab, House in Kanha National Park, Temple in Lanji, Gangulpara Dam

- Location of Balaghat district in Madhya Pradesh
- Country: India
- State: Madhya Pradesh
- Division: Jabalpur
- Headquarters: Balaghat
- Tehsils: 1. Balaghat, 2. Baihar, 3. Waraseoni, 4. Katangi, 5. Lalbarra, 6. Lanji, 7. Khairlanji, 8. Kirnapur, 9. Birsa, 10. Paraswada, 11. Tirodi, 12. Lamta.

Government
  - District Collector: Shri. Kumar Satyam, IAS
  - Lok Sabha constituencies: Balaghat

Area
  - Total: 9,245 km^{2} (3,570 sq mi)

Population (2011)
  - Total: 1,701,698
  - Density: 184.1/km^{2} (476.7/sq mi)

Demographics
  - Literacy: 78.29%
  - Sex ratio: 1021
- Time zone: UTC+05:30 (IST)
- Major highways: NH 12A, SH 26, SH 11, SH 53
- Website: balaghat.nic.in

Balaghat district (Hindi pronunciation: [baːlaːgʱaːʈ]) is a district of Madhya Pradesh state in Central India. Its belongs to Jabalpur division. Balaghat city is administrative headquarters of Balaghat district. Balaghat district is located in southeastern part of Madhya Pradesh.

Balaghat is known for its tile factories, rice mills and forests. In MP Balaghat district has significant mineral deposits and a number of forests.

== History ==
At the beginning of the 18th century, the district was divided among two Gond kingdoms; the portion of the district west of the Wainganga was part of the Gond kingdom of Deogarh, while the eastern portion was part of the Garha kingdom.

The Deogarh kingdom was annexed by the Bhonsle Marathas of Nagpur in 1743, and shortly thereafter conquered all but the northern section of the district. This section, together with the rest of the Garha-Mandla kingdom, was annexed in 1781 to the Maratha province of Saugor, then under control of the Maratha Peshwa. In 1798, the Bhonsles also obtained the former Garha–Mandla territories.

In 1818, at the conclusion of the Third Anglo-Maratha War, The Nagpur kingdom became a princely state of British India. In 1853, the Nagpur kingdom, including Balaghat District, was annexed by the British, and became the new province of Nagpur. Balaghat district was then divided among the British districts of Seoni and Bhandara. Nagpur Province was reorganized into the Central Provinces in 1861.

Balaghat district was constituted during the years 1867–1873 by amalgamation of parts of the Bhandara, Mandla and Seoni districts. The headquarters of the district was originally called "Burha" or "बूढ़ा". Later, however, this name fell into disuse and was replaced by "Balaghat", which was originally the name of the district only. Administratively, the district was divided into only two tehsils, Baihar tehsil in the north, which included the plateau region, and Balaghat tehsil in south, which included the more settled lowlands in the south. The new district was part of the Central Provinces Nagpur division.

After Indian Independence in 1947, the Central Provinces became the Indian state of Madhya Pradesh. In 1956, Balaghat District became part of the Jabalpur division of Madhya Pradesh, when the districts to the south of Balaghat, including Old Bhandara (current Bhandara and Gondia), and Nagpur districts, were transferred to Bombay State.

Balaghat name signifies "above the ghats" and is due to the fact that the original purpose of Government in constituting the district was to effect the colonisation of the tracts above the ghats.

In the middle of the 19th century, the upper part of the district was a lightly settled, and an ancient Buddhist temple of cut stone is suggestive of a civilization which had disappeared before historic times. The first Deputy Commissioner of the district, Colonel Bloomfield is believed as the pioneer or the creator of Balaghat district whom encouraged the settlement of Baihar tehsil with Powar cultivators from the Wainganga Valley. About that time one Lachhman Powar established the first villages on the Paraswada plateau. Malanjkhand is a copper mine in the region.

In 1868–1869 the rains ceased a month before time, causing the failure of the lowland rice crop and a famine. The district suffered very severely from the famine of 1896-1897, when the output of all crops fell to only 17 percent of normal. The district suffered again in 1899–1900, when the rice crop failed again, falling to only 23 percent of normal. The population in 1901 was 326,521, having decreased 15% in the decade 1891–1901, due to the effects of famine.

At the beginning of the 20th century, the district had only 15 miles (24 km) of paved roads, together with 208 miles (335 km) of unpaved roads. The Jabalpur–Gondia railway line through the district was completed in 1904, with six stations in the district.

Balaghat District is currently a part of the red corridor.

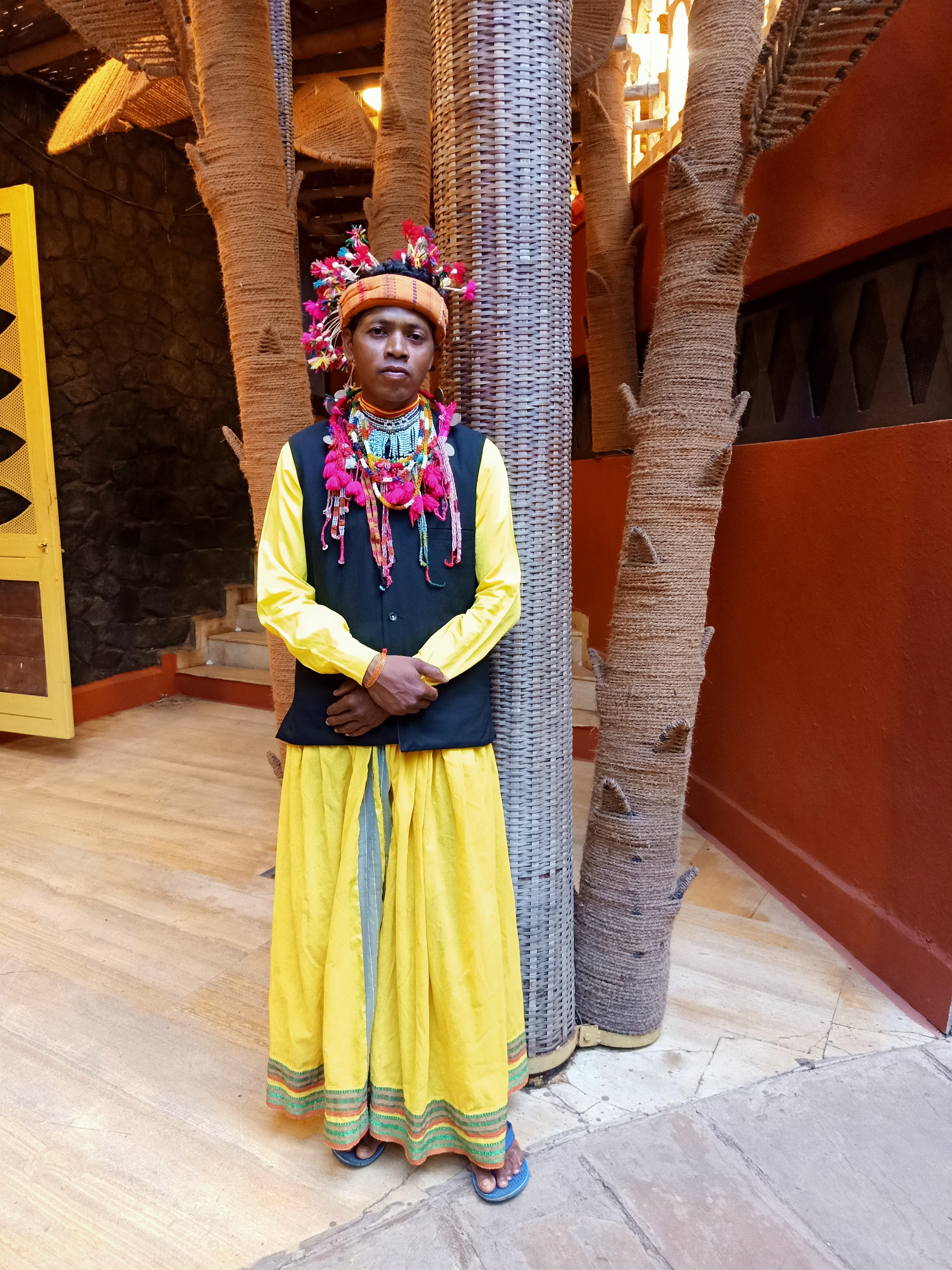
Baiga tribe man in his traditional wear

In 1845, Lord Dalhousie started the tradition of adoption (गोद लेने की प्रथा ). Through this tradition states of the Gond rulers were added to the British states, at that time the actual name of this place was BARAHGHAT. For the fixing of this name the name a proposal was sent to the capital of that time Calcutta before 1911. The name Barahghat drives because all the names of hills contain the word ghat, In which Masen Ghat, Kanjai Ghat, Ranrama Ghat, Basa Ghat, Dongri Ghat, Selan Ghat, Bhaisana Ghat, Saletekri Ghat, Dongaria Ghat, Kavahrgarh ghat, Ahmadpur ghat, Teepagarh Ghat are important. When this word was sent to Calcutta it merged with ANGL word and the name was Baraghat. When this was returned from there the name changed "L" as Balaghat means in the position of "R" which was permitted and the District got its name as Balaghat. On 1 November 1956 it was declared as Independent District of newly created State of Madhya Pradesh.

== Geography ==
Balaghat district is located in the southern part of Jabalpur division. It occupies the south eastern portion of the Satpura Range and the upper valley of the Wainganga River. The district extends from 21°19' to 22°24' north latitude and 79°31' to 81°3' east longitude. The total area of the district is 9,245 km^{2}. Balaghat District is bounded by Mandla district of Madhya Pradesh to the north, Dindori district to the northwest, Rajnandgaon district of Chhattisgarh state to the east, Gondia and Bhandara districts of Maharashtra state to the south, and Seoni district of Madhya Pradesh to the west. The main languages spoken in district are Hindi, Gondi, Chattishgarhi and Powari in Baihar & Ukwa, Powari in Paraswada, Northern parts of Balaghat Tehsil and Bharveli, Kalari in Lanji & kirnapur, Powari in western parts i.e. Waraseoni, Katangi & Lalbarra and Marathi in the southern part of district.

The Wainganga River and its tributaries are the most important rivers in the district. The town of Balaghat is situated on the bank of the Wainganga, which flows north to south through the district and rnters in Balaghat district by merging with Thanwar river near Nainpur of Mandla district. The Bagh, Nahra and Uskal rivers are tributaries of the Wainganga. The Bawanthadi and Bagh rivers define the boundary with Maharashtra.

The southern part of the Vindhyan Range up to Katangi is called Lower Bhander Range. Beyond this point the escarpment enclosing the land-locked valley of Sirampur and the hill range in continuation is called the Kaimur Range.

Geographically the district is divided into three parts:

- The southern lowlands, a slightly undulating plain, cultivated and drained by the Wainganga, Bagh, Deo, Ghisri and Son rivers.
- The long narrow valley known as the Mau Taluka, lying between the hills and the Wainganga river, and comprising a long, narrow, irregular-shaped lowland tract, intersected by hill ranges and peaks covered with dense jungle, and running generally from north to south.
- The plateau, in which is situated the Raigarh Bichhia tract, comprising irregular ranges of hills, broken into numerous valleys, and generally running from east to west. The highest points in the hills of the district are as follows: - Peaks above Lanji, 2300 or 2,500 feet (760 m); Tepagarh hill, about 2,600 ft (790 m).; and Bhainsaghat range, about 3,000 ft (910 m). above the sea. The Banjar, Halon and Jamunia rivers, tributaries of the Narmada, drain a portion of the upper plateau.

== Economy ==
In 2006 the Ministry of Panchayati Raj named Balaghat one of the country's 250 most backward districts (out of a total of 640). It is one of the 24 districts in Madhya Pradesh currently receiving funds from the Backward Regions Grant Fund Programme (BRGF).

== Divisions ==
Administratively, the district is divided into eleven development blocks/Tehsils viz : Balaghat, Baihar, Birsa, Paraswada, Katangi, Waraseoni, Lalbarra, Khairlanji, Lanji, Kirnapur, Tirodi and Lamta.

== Transport ==
The Jabalpur–Balaghat section of South East Central Railway runs north to south through the district, along the valley of the Satpura Mountains and Wainganga River valley . The line was formerly narrow gauge (2 ft 6 in (762 mm)) for its entire length, but the section between Balaghat to Gondia was converted to broad gauge in 2005–06, connecting Balaghat to India's national broad gauge network for the first time. Work is underway to convert the Balaghat–Jabalpur section to broad gauge as well which is complete now and trains run from Vidisha to Gondia. A broad-gauge line runs to west from Balaghat to Katangi. And there is a line to Bharveli for manganese transport

Balaghat is directly connected by bus with larger cities such as Bhopal, Nagpur, Indore Jabalpur, Sagar, Raipur, Durg etc.

== Demographics ==
Historical population
Year	Pop.	±% p.a.
1901	399,934	—
1911	475,924	+1.75%
1921	511,634	+0.73%
1931	561,602	+0.94%
1941	634,350	+1.23%
1951	693,379	+0.89%
1961	806,702	+1.53%
1971	977,583	+1.94%
1981	1,147,810	+1.62%
1991	1,365,870	+1.75%
2001	1,497,968	+0.93%
2011	1,701,698	+1.28%

According to the 2011 census Balaghat district has a population of 1,701,698, roughly equal to the nation of The Gambia or the US state of Nebraska. This gives it a ranking of 288th in India (out of a total of 640). The district has a population density of 184 inhabitants per square kilometre (480/sq mi). Its population growth rate over the decade 2001–11 was 13.56%. Balaghat has a sex ratio of 1021 females for every 1000 males, and a literacy rate of 78.29%. 14.39% of the population lives in urban areas.

The major Hindu castes include Powar, Brahmin, Rajput, Lodhi, Kunbi, Teli etc.

Scheduled Castes and Scheduled Tribes made up 125,426 (7.37%) and 383,026 (22.51%) of the population respectively.

Religions in Balaghat district (2011)
Religion	Percent
Hinduism	89.29%
Buddhism	4.24%
Other (tribal religion)	3.41%
Islam	2.26%
Other or not stated	0.80%

Hindus are 89.29%, Buddhists are 4.24% and Muslims are 2.26%. Other religions (mainly tribal tradition) is 3.41%.

Languages of Balaghat district (2011)
1. Hindi (40.9%)
2. Marathi (16.4%)
3. Powari (9.64%)
4. 'Other' Hindi (9.55%)
5. Gondi (9.35%)
6. Chhattisgarhi (5.33%)
7. Lodhi (5.22%)
8. Kalari (1.18%)
9. Others (2.47%)

At the time of the 2011 census of India, 40.85% of the population in the district spoke Hindi, 16.41% Marathi, 9.64% Powari, 9.35% Gondi, 5.33% Chhattisgarhi, 5.22% Lodhi and 1.18% Kalari as their first language. 9.55% of the population spoke another variety classed under Hindi.

As per the 2001 Census, the total population of the district is 1,497,968, of which 1,236,083 is rural population and 129,787 is urban. Out of the total population, 113,105 are Scheduled Caste and 298,665 are Scheduled Tribes. The no. of males was 682,260 and the no. of females was 683,610. According to the District website the total area of the district is 9245 km^{2}, making the population density 162 persons per km^{2}.

In the 1991 Census, the total population of the district was 1,365,870.

== Tourist places ==
- Kanha National Park
- Pench National Park
- Dhuty Dam

== Villages ==
- Rampayli
- Seoti
- Kokna
- Dhoriya Padaswada
- Binora
- Jamdi
- Kandri
- Bhanegaon
- Hirri
- Kirnapur
- Hatta
- Kinhi
- Kalkatta
- Palhera
- Bhanegaon
- Borgaon
- Kotri
- Bhimodi
- Bolegaon

== Flora and fauna ==
About 80% of the district's area is covered with forest. it is also the District of Madhya Pradesh which has maximum Forest Density. Teak (Tectona grandis), sal (Shorea robusta), bamboo and saja are the main trees. Fauna includes tiger, leopard, bear, nilgai, deer, and gaur, and birds like peacock, Red Bulbul and Koyal. Kanha National Park (Mukki) lies in the district.

== Notable people ==
- Hemlata Mahishwar, Indian Hindi writer, literary critic.

== Geographical indication ==
Balaghat Chinnor rice was awarded the Geographical Indication (GI) status tag from the Geographical Indications Registry under the Government of India on 14 September 2021 (valid until 2 October 2029).

Balaghat Chinnor Utpadak Sahkari Samiti Maryadit Balaghat from Waraseoni, proposed the GI registration of Balaghat Chinnor rice. After filing the application in October 2019, the rice was granted the GI tag in 2021 by the Geographical Indication Registry in Chennai, making the name "Balaghat Chinnor rice" exclusive to the rice grown in the region. It thus became the first rice variety from Madhya Pradesh and the 12th type of goods from Madhya Pradesh to earn the GI tag.

The GI tag protects the rice from illegal selling and marketing, and gives it legal protection and a unique identity.
