= Balaghat =

Indian city and municipality

- City
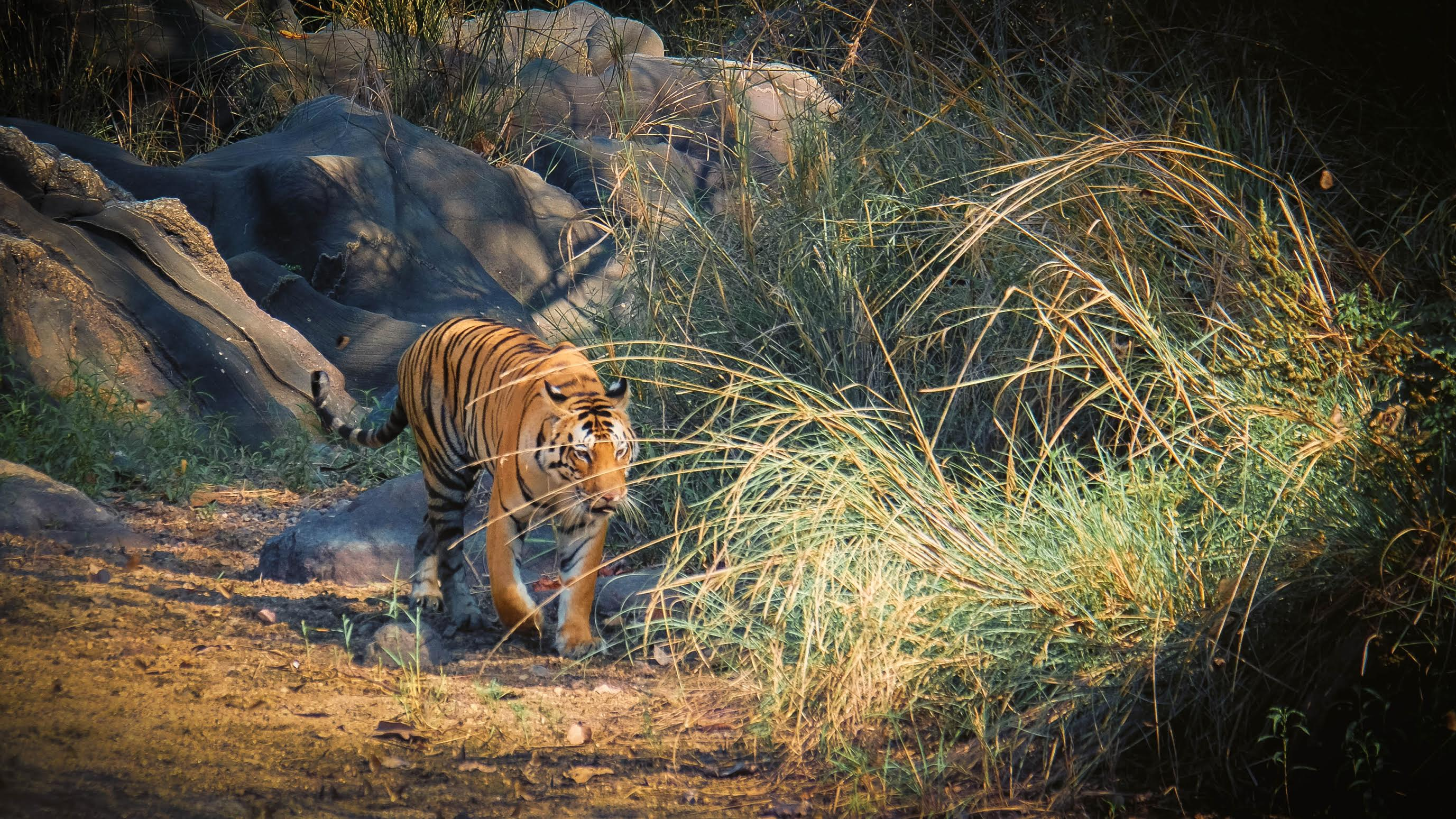
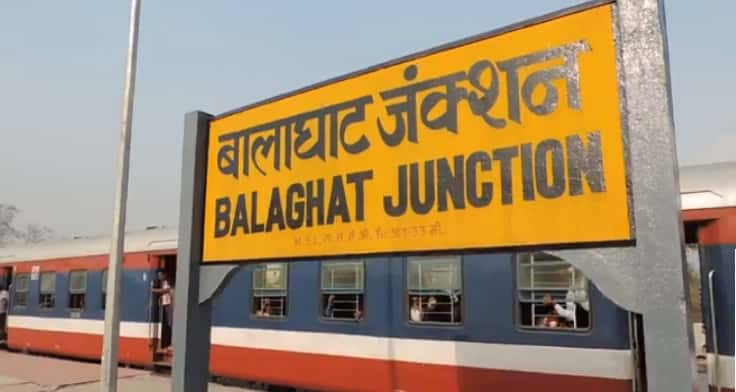
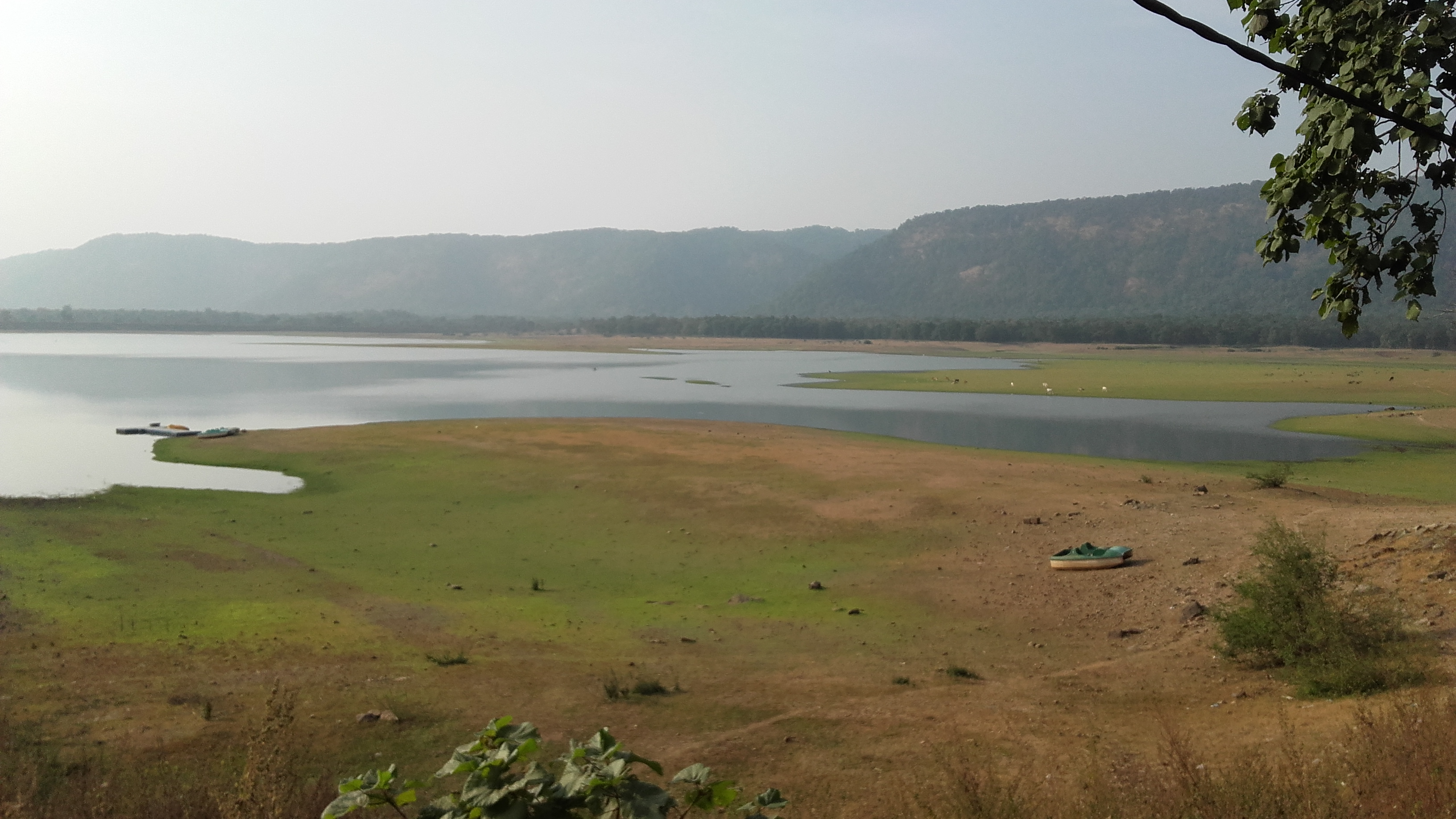
- Indian Tiger in Kanha Tiger Reserve Balaghat Junction Railway Station Gangulpara Reservoir Balaghat

- Location in Madhya Pradesh, India Balaghat (India)
- Coordinates: 21.8°N 80.18°E
- Country: India
- State: Madhya Pradesh
- District: Balaghat

Government
  - Type: Municipal Council
  - Body: Balaghat Municipal Council
- Elevation: 288 m (945 ft)

Population (2011)
  - Total: 84,261

Languages
  - Official: 1)Hindi (Primary); 2)English (Additional) 3)Powari (पोवारी) language (language of Powar/Panwar people's), 4) Gondi (caste language of schedule tribes people's), Chattisgarhi language (speaking in northeastern part of balaghat), 5) Marathi (speaking by some marathi communities in south part of Balaghat)
- Time zone: UTC+5:30 (IST)
- PIN: 481001
- ISO 3166 code: IN-MP
- Vehicle registration: MP-50
- Website: balaghat.nic.in

Balaghat is a city and a municipality in Balaghat district, in the state of Madhya Pradesh, India. It is the administrative headquarters of Balaghat District. The Wainganga River flows beside the town. The nearest airport is Birsi (Gondia).

The headquarters of the district was originally called "Burha" or "बूढ़ा". Later, however, this name fell into disuse and was replaced by "Balaghat", which was originally the name of the district only. Balaghat is known for its tile factories, rice mills and forests.

== Geography ==
Balaghat is located at 21°48′N 80°11′E. It has an average elevation of 288 metres (944 feet).

Balaghat is surrounded by dense forests of Satpura, Wainganga River flows through Balaghat.

== Demographics ==
As of the 2011 Census of India, Balaghat had a population of 84,216. Males constitute 51% of the population and females 49%. 11% of the population is under 6 years of age.

== Government ==
Balaghat Is part of Balaghat Assembly constituency, in 2023 Madhya Pradesh Legislative Assembly election Anubha Munjare is elected mla from Indian National Congress. Entire assembly is part of Balaghat Lok Sabha constituency in 2024 Bharti Pardhi is elected mp from balaghat lok sabha.

== Education Institute ==
Many Govt and Private School situated in balaghat, There are number of educational institutions in Balaghat, such as a Government Boys and Government Girls schools.

Many higher education college are available in balaghat belongs to Rani Durgawati University Jabalpur.

- Sardar Patel University, Balaghat
- JataShankar Trivedi Government P.G. College, Balaghat
- Government Kamla Nehru Girls College, Balaghat
- Govt. Polytechnic College, Balaghat

== Economy ==
Balaghat's economy relies primarily on agriculture, minerals, and forest wealth. It is considered one of the prosperous districts of Madhya Pradesh.

Industrial Status: Heavy industries are lacking in Balaghat, but rice mills, tile factories and mineral-based small industries are plentiful. Malajkhand has Asia's largest open-pit copper mine, operated by Hindustan Copper Limited.

== Notable people ==
- Anand Bais
- Gaurishankar Bisen
- Hemlata Mahishwar
- Hugh Bartlett

== Transport ==
Balaghat is connected with Railway and Roadways, Balaghat junction railway station is major railway station of city, Jabalpur - Gondia railline passing through balaghat. Many trains halting in here.
