= Presbyterian Free Church of Central India =

Church in India

The Presbyterian Free Church of Central India (formerly known as the Free Church of Central India) is a confessional Reformed denomination in India, established by Scottish missionaries.

The Free Church of Scotland established this church in Central India in the end of 19th century. The denomination has 4 churches in Jabalpur and other small villages like Chhapara and Lakhnadon, where it runs Mission Higher Secondary school in Chhapara, which is one of the best and reputed schools of the region. Mission school Chhapara is also well known for its facilities like Smart Digital Classes, Atal Tinkering Robatics Lab and CC cameras facilities, the school maintains a distinct identity in the region due to its excellent education, good discipline, excellent results, and remarkable achievements in science, General Knowledge, sports and other competitions. The school also provides scholarships, stationeries, medical help and uniforms etc. to the poorer students.

The Church is involved in educational, medical and social work in the region. The church was known as the "Free Church in Central India" until 2007 when the church become the Presbyterian Free Church of Central India.

The denomination subscribes the Westminster Confession of Faith (1647) and has one regional Presbytery.

The church is a member of the World Reformed Fellowship and the International Conference of Reformed Churches
