= Ghansor railway station =

Railway station in Madhya Pradesh, India

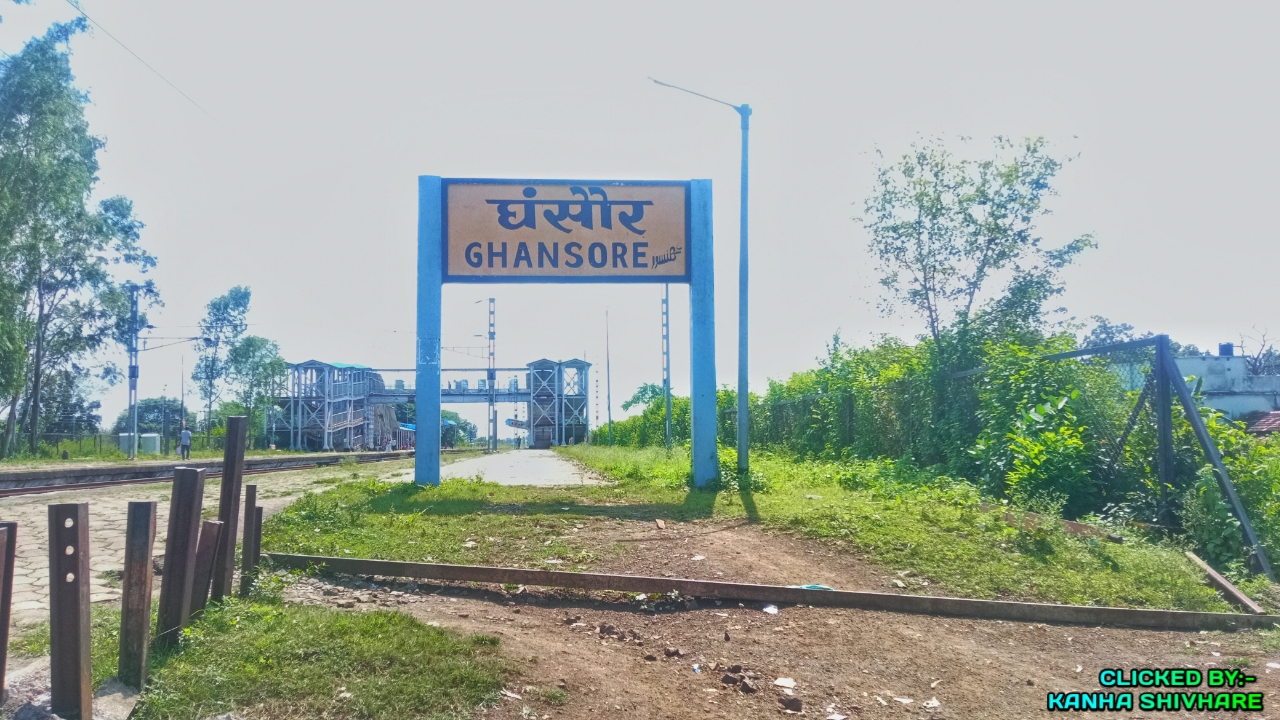
- Ghansor Railway Station

General information
- Other names: Ghansaur railway station or Ghansore railway station
- Location: Ghansor, Seoni district, Madhya Pradesh; India
- Coordinates: 22.656021°N 79.954369°E
- System: Indian Railways station
- Operator: Indian Railways
- Line: Jabalpur–Gondia line
- Platforms: 2
- Tracks: Single electrified line
- Connections: Auto stand

Construction
- Structure type: Standard (on-ground station)
- Parking: Yes
- Cycle facilities: No

Other information
- Status: Functioning
- Station code: GNS
- Fare zone: South East Central Railway
Location
- Location within Madhya Pradesh Location within India

Ghansor railway station (station code: GNS) serves the town of Ghansor in Seoni district, Madhya Pradesh. It is part of the South East Central Railway zone under the Nagpur division and lies on the Jabalpur–Gondia line. The station mainly handles regional trains connecting nearby towns and cities.

== Location ==
Ghansor railway station is situated in Ghansor town, a tehsil headquarters in Seoni district. The station provides access to several nearby villages and serves as an important transport hub for the local population.

== Station details ==
Feature	Details
Station code	GNS
Location	Ghansor, Seoni district, Madhya Pradesh
Zone / Division	South East Central Railway / Nagpur division
Platforms	2 (ground-level)
Tracks	Single electrified line
Daily train halts	Approximately 12
Main services	Passenger, MEMU, Mail/Express
Nearby stations	Binaiki(North) and Nidhani (south)
Connectivity	Jabalpur, Gondia, Rewa, Itwari (Nagpur)

== Train services ==
Several Passenger, MEMU, and Mail/Express trains stop at Ghansor station. Some of the key trains include:

- NSC Bose Itwari–Rewa Express (via Gondia and via Chhindwara)
- Jabalpur–Nainpur Passenger (51705/51706/51703)
- Jabalpur–Gondia Passenger (51707/51708)

These services connect Ghansor to important regional centers such as Jabalpur, Gondia, Rewa, and Nagpur.

== Facilities ==
The station has two platforms and offers basic amenities for passengers:

- Waiting areas: Covered seating and waiting rooms
- Tickets: Computerised reservation counters and on-site ticketing
- Food: Small stalls or kiosks selling snacks
- Sanitation: Drinking water and restrooms
- Other: Seating on platforms and parking area; auto-rickshaws and taxis are available outside

The station does not have escalators or lifts.

== Accessibility ==
- By road: Ghansor is connected by State Highway 40 with regular bus services to nearby towns including Lakhnadon, Seoni, Jabalpur, and Mandla.
- By air: The closest airport is Jabalpur Airport, about 58–59 km away.
- Local transport: Auto-rickshaws, taxis, and cycle rickshaws are available at the station.

== Cleanliness and safety ==
The station is generally clean and well-maintained. Proper Lighting and signage are available on the platforms. Basic security is provided by standard Railway Protection Force (RPF) patrols.

== Importance ==
Ghansor railway station plays a vital role in connecting the surrounding rural and tribal communities to larger cities. It also helps in the transport of agricultural products from the region. The station lies on the line connecting Jabalpur in Madhya Pradesh to Gondia in Maharashtra.

== Nearby attractions ==
- Payli Rest House (Bargi Reservoir): Offers scenic views of the Bargi reservoir.
- Mathghoghara Village (Shiva Cave Temple): Known for an ancient Shiva lingam cave temple, about 10 km west of Lakhnadon.
- Pench Tiger Reserve: Wildlife sanctuary located south of Ghansor.
- Local temples: Several small temples including Shiva and Hanuman temples in Ghansor town.

== See also ==
- Mehta (village)
- Ghansor
- Seoni
