= Bandol (disambiguation) =

Bandol may refer to:

- Bandol, France
- Bandol wine
- Bandol (instrument)
- Bandul, Iran
- Bandol, Seoni
- Bandul, Travnik - see list of populated places in Bosnia and Herzegovina
