= Ghansor =

Town in seoni district of Madhya Pradesh, India

Ghansor Ghansaur, ghansore, Kanhapaas
- town
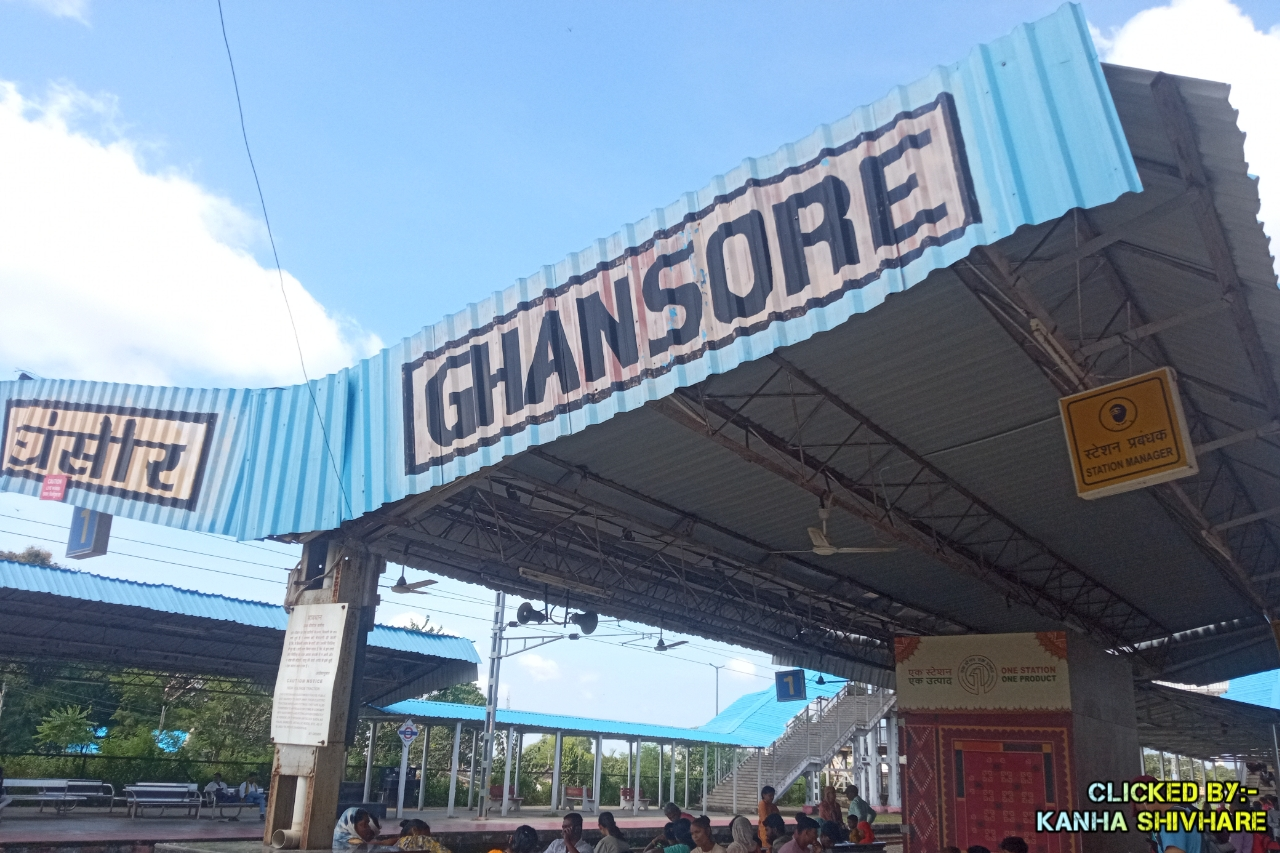
- Ghansor Railway station
- Nickname: Apna Ghansor
- Location in Madhya Pradesh, India Ghansor (India)
- Coordinates: 22.65°N 79.95°E
- Country: India
- State: Madhya Pradesh
- District: Seoni
- Established: After 1956

Government
  - Type: Sub-district (Tehsil)

Area
  - town: 1,096 km^{2} (423 sq mi)
  - Urban: 5.16 km^{2} (1.99 sq mi)
  - Rural: 1,091.31 km^{2} (421.36 sq mi)
  - Rank: Urban/Rural

Population (2011)
  - town: 7,120 (proper)
  - Rank: Shahari & Gramin
  - Density: 6.50/km^{2} (16.8/sq mi)
  - Urban: 7,120
  - Rural: 135,542

Languages
  - Official: Hindi
- Time zone: UTC+5:30 (IST)
- Postal code: 480997
- Postal code: 480997
- Area code: 07693
- ISO 3166 code: IN-MP fpop
- Vehicle registration: MP22
- Climate: Cwa

Ghansor(Kanhapaas) is a small census town in Seoni district in the state of Madhya Pradesh. It serves the headquarters for Janpad panchayat Ghansor. It hosts a railway station which is in the South Eastern Central Railways zone connecting Jabalpur and Balaghat. It has a government community health centre and has a robust government education centre with a network of schools and colleges both private and public. It is well connected with bus services from Lakhnadon, Seoni, Jabalpur and Mandla.

== Geography ==
Ghansor is located at 22.65°N 79.95°E. It has an average elevation of 582 metres (1,909 feet). The town is situated in the heart of India. Ghansor is a Tehsil / Block (CD) in the Seoni District of Madhya Pradesh. According to Census 2011 information the sub-district code of Ghansor block is 03661. Total area of Ghansor is 1,096 km^{2} including 1,091.31 km^{2} rural area and 5.16 km^{2} urban area. Ghansor as a sub-district has a population of 1,42,662 people. The average annual rainfall ranges from 1200 to 1400 mm. Agriculture forms the backbone of the local economy, with major crops including paddy, maize, wheat, and soyabean. It is well connected by both rail and road.

== Demographics ==
As of 2001 India census, Ghansor as a town had a population of 6,130. Males constitute 53% of the population and females 47%. Ghansor has an average literacy rate of 70%, higher than the national average of 59.5%: male literacy is 76%, and female literacy is 64%.There are 33,092 houses in the sub-district. There are about 216 villages in Ghansor block. In Ghansor, 15% of the population is under 6 years of age. Religious communities found here include Jains Hindus Muslims Christians. Equal respect and toleration among communities are found here. Further the majority of the population are tribes which follow gondi culture having rich custom and traditions.

== Education ==
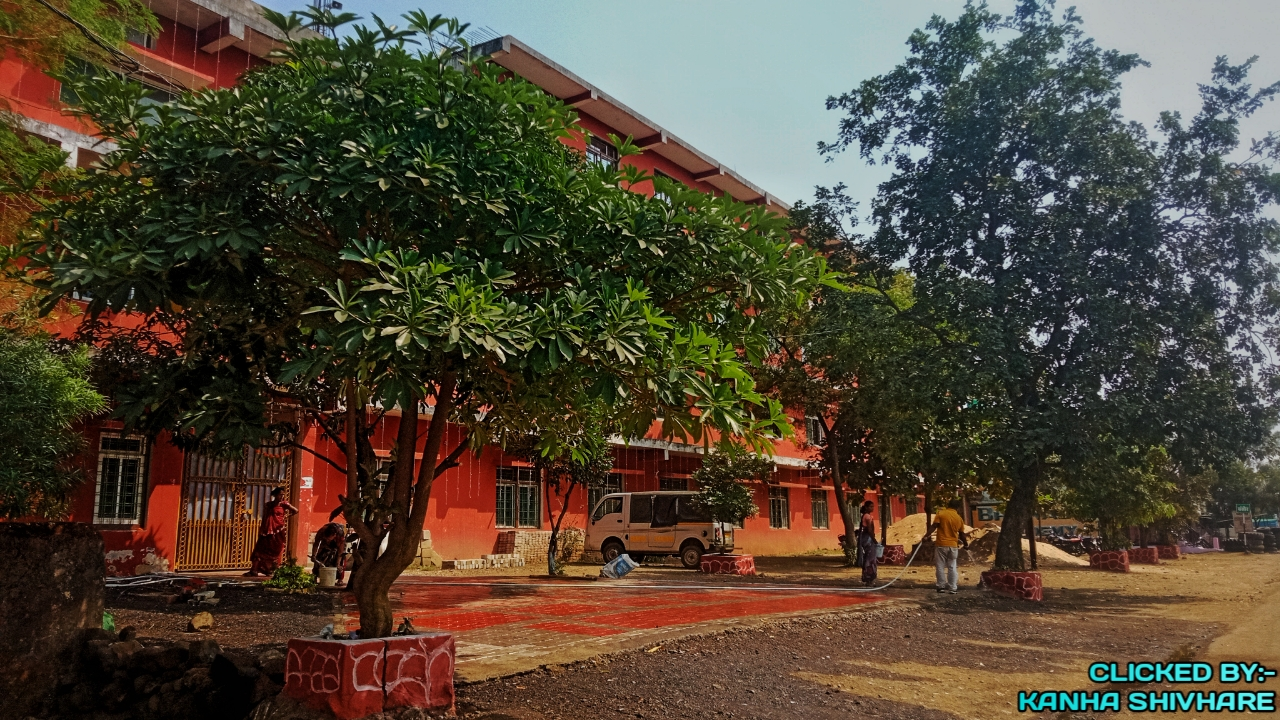
Bhawa's Academy Higher secondary school located at Ghansor

=== Schools in Ghansor ===
- Bhawa’s Academy High School – A private school in Ghansor providing education up to higher secondary level.
- Eklavya Model Residential School – A government senior secondary school in Ghansor, affiliated to the Central Board of Secondary Education (CBSE) (Affiliation No. 1020119). It offers education from middle to higher secondary levels.
- Saraswati Shishu Vidya Mandir, Ghansor – A school in Ghansor offering primary and secondary education, managed by the private aided sector.
- Anamika Convent High School – A private unassigned high school in Ghansore offering secondary and higher secondary classes.
- Government and Local Schools in Ghansor – Other government and local schools include middle schools and primary schools in rural Ghansore area, categorized under the Block Education Office (BEO) Ghansor.

== Transportation ==
=== Railways ===
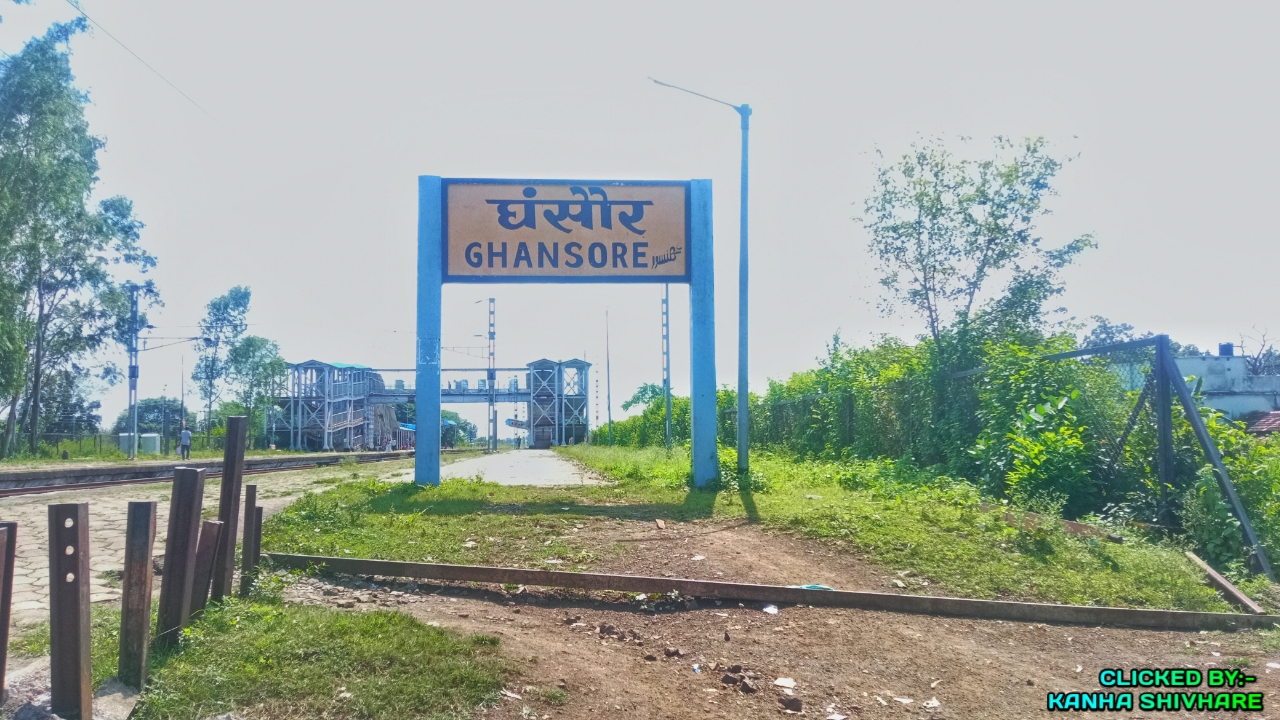
Ghansor railway station nameboard

Ghansor railway station is the railway station located at ghansor. several trains towards jabalpur and nainpur go through the railway station.

== Gallery ==
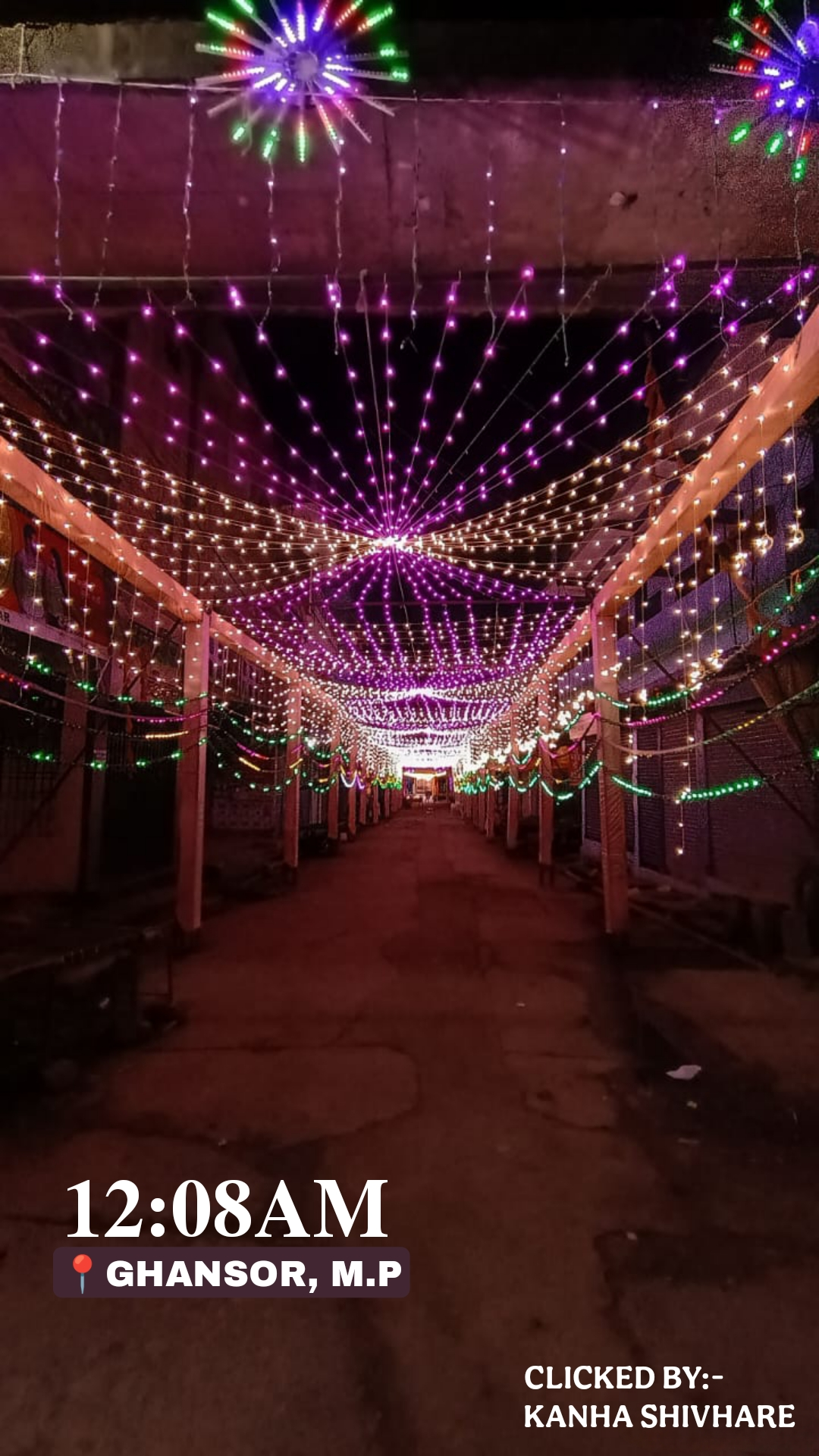
Night view of Navyug Mandal Chowk, Ghansor during Navratri

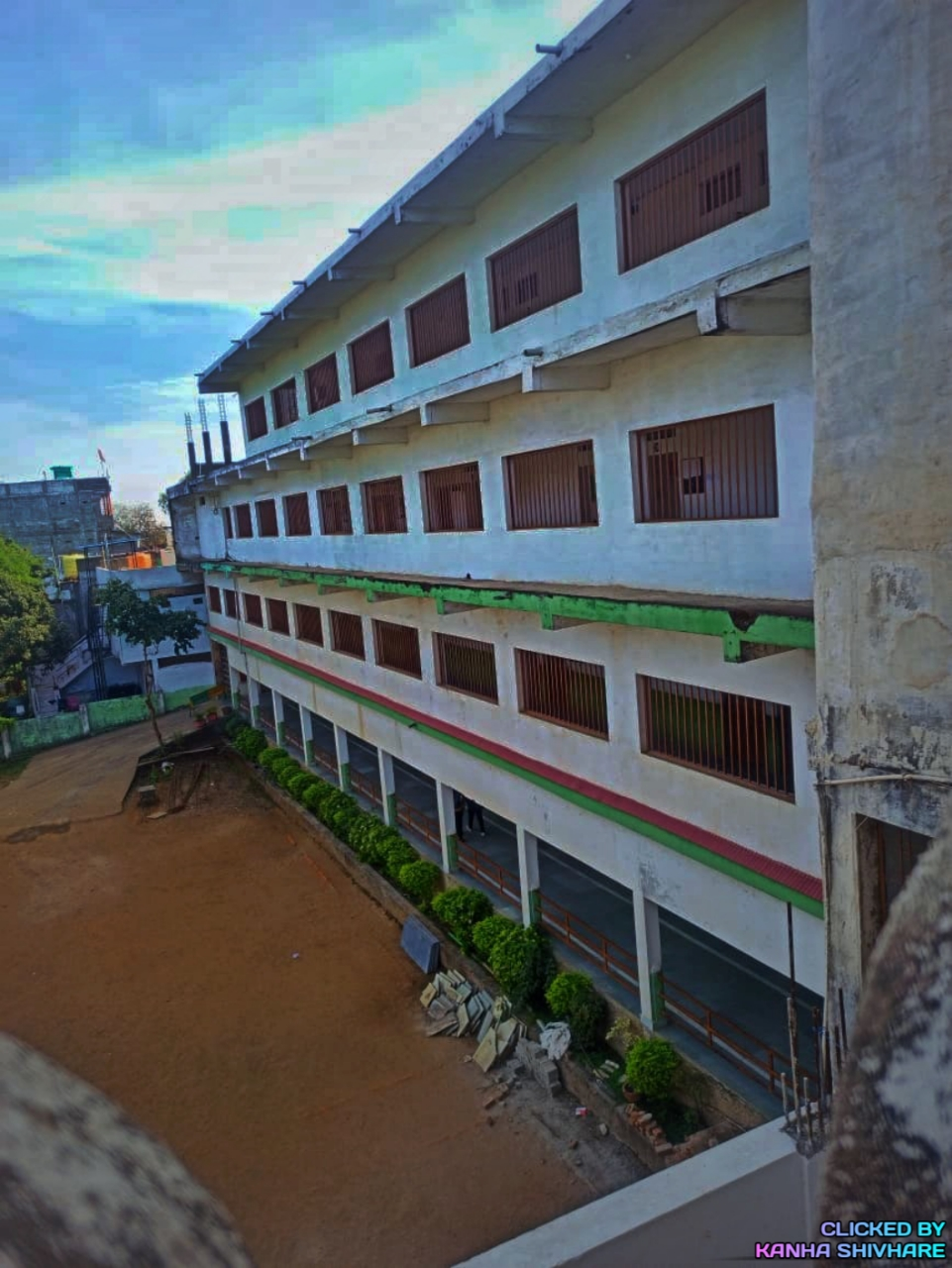
Inside view of Bhawa's academy school in Ghansor as per December 2025

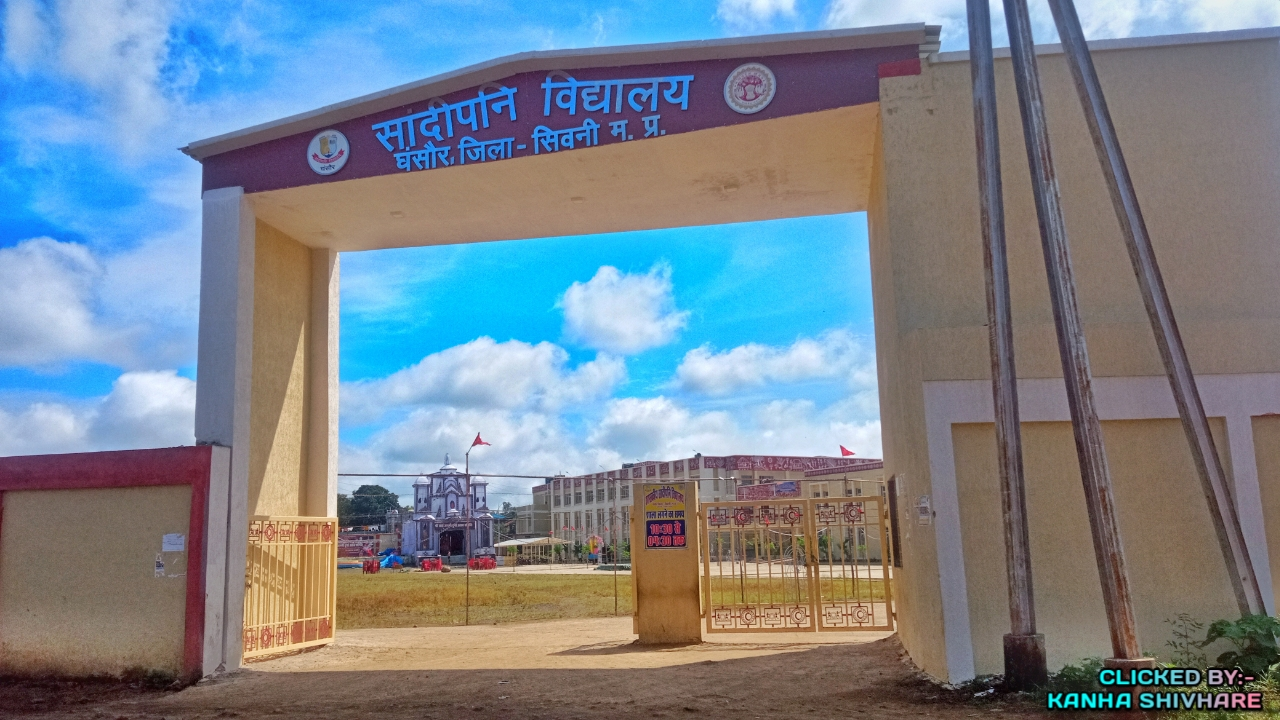
CM rise school also known as Sandipani Vidyalaya in Ghansor, Madhya Pradesh

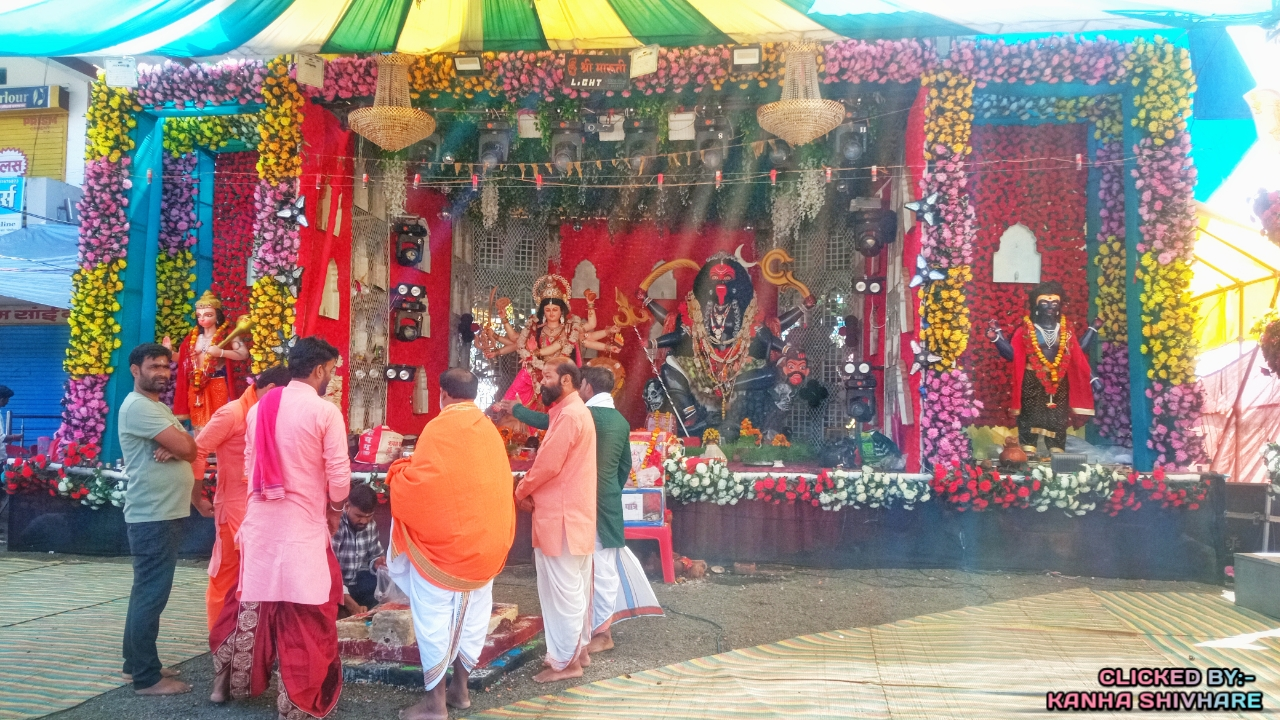
Navratri Durga Puja pandaal at Centre point-Ghansor

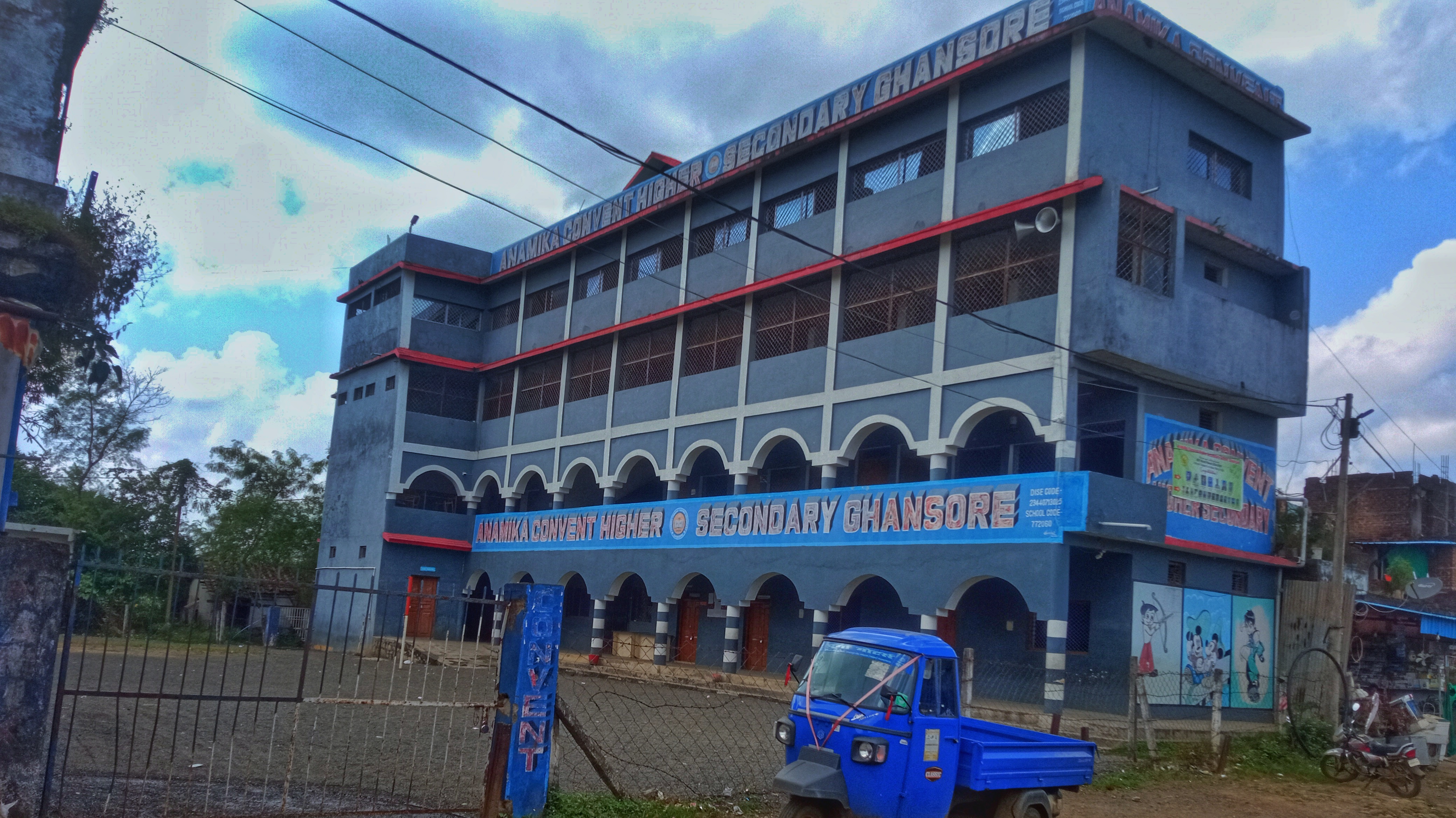
Anamika Convent school

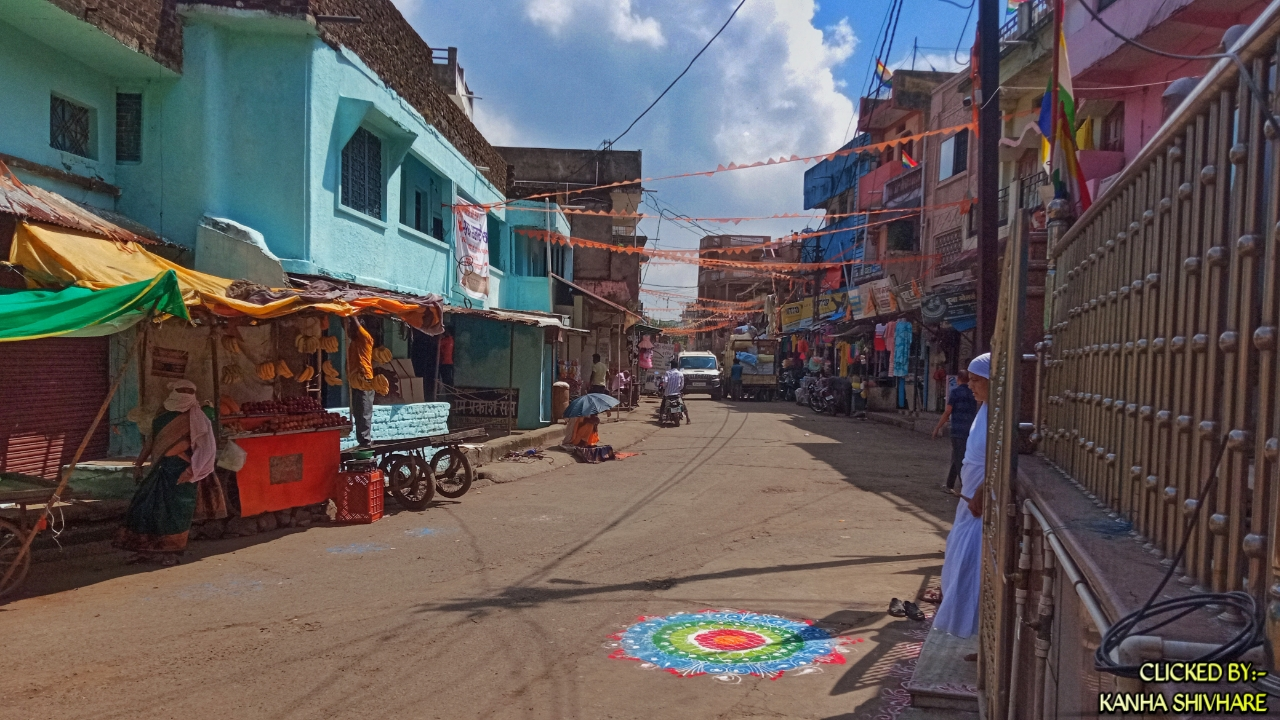
A street at Ghansor

== See also ==
- Mehta (village)
- Seoni District
- Ghansor railway station
