= Mehta (village) =

- village
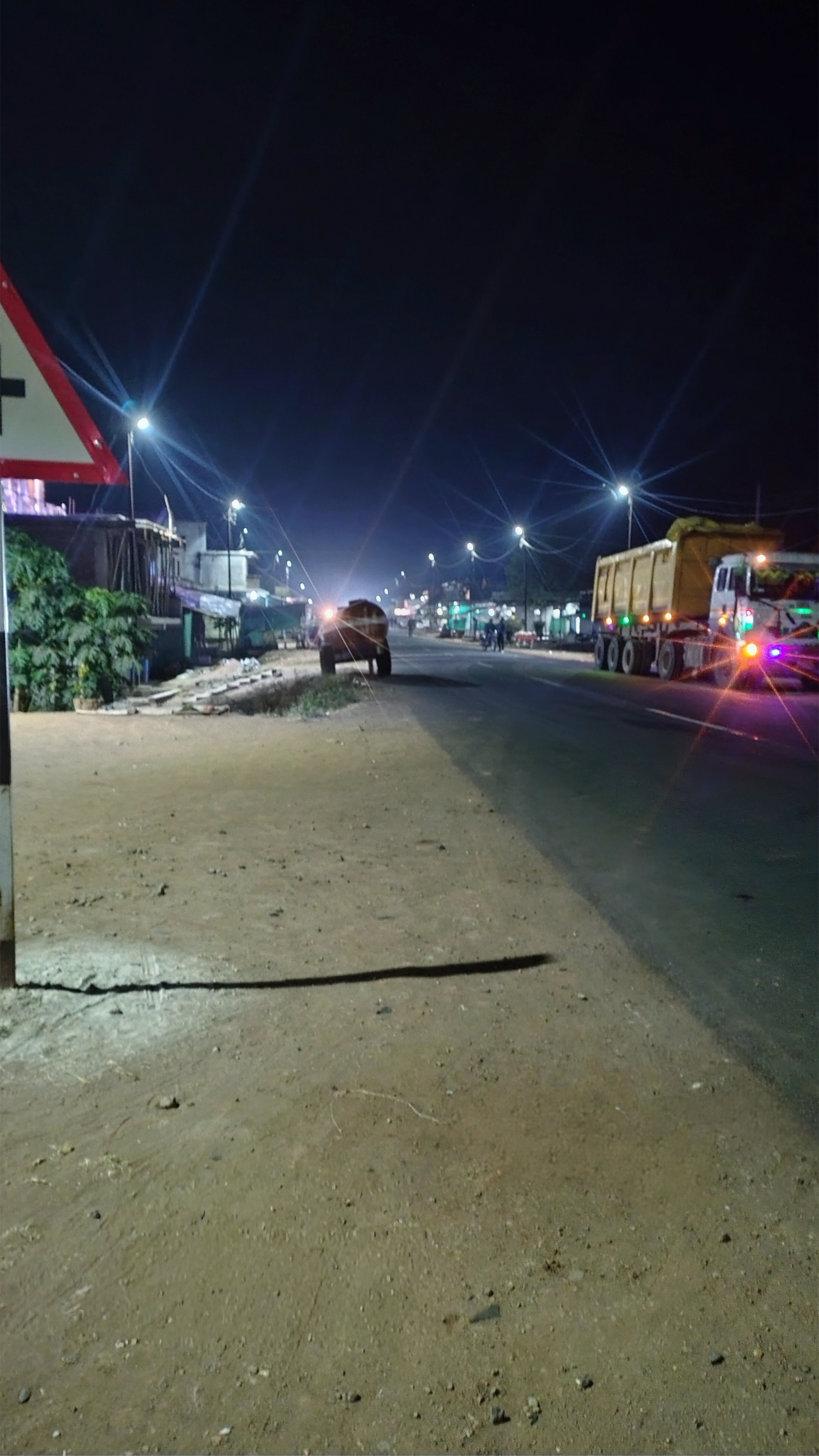
- Nickname: Apna Mehta
- Location in Madhya Pradesh, India Mehta (India)
- Coordinates: 22.6316416°N 79.8662469°E
- Country: India
- State: Madhya Pradesh
- District: Seoni
- Tehsil: Ghansor

Area
  - Total: 6.10 km^{2} (2.36 sq mi)

Population (2011)
  - Total: 1,966
- Time zone: UTC+5:30 (IST)
- Postal code: 480999
- Vehicle registration: MP-22

Mehta (IPA: [meːɦtaː]) is a village and gram panchayat in Ghansor tehsil, Seoni district, in the Indian state of Madhya Pradesh. It is approximately 11 km from Ghansor headquarters and 89 km from the district headquarters of Seoni. The village sits along the main road connecting Lakhnadon and Mandla which is madhya pradesh state highway 33(MP SH 33).

== Geography ==
With a total geographical area of around 609.6 hectares (6.10 km²), Mehta is located in the central Indian Satpura region, within the forest–agriculture transition zone. The terrain includes fields, small forest patches, and the broader Satpura–Mahadeo range ecosystem characteristic of the Seoni district.

== Demographics ==
According to the 2011 Census of India, Mehta is home to about 1,966 people living in 458 households. There are around 941 women for every 1,000 men in the village. About 14% of the population are young children aged 0 to 6, and among them, there are roughly 923 girls for every 1,000 boys.

The village has a literacy rate of 72.42%, which is higher than the average in the Seoni district (around 62–63%). Breaking it down by gender, about 78.42% of men and 66.06% of women in Mehta can read and write. In total, 854 residents were employed in work activities, with 81.1% engaged in main work (more than six months of employment), including 213 cultivators and 252 agricultural labourers.

== Administration ==
Mehta serves as its own gram panchayat, administered under the Panchayati Raj system by an elected sarpanch since at least 2009. It falls under Kahnapas (Ghansor) Block Panchayat, part of the Mandla Lok Sabha constituency and Lakhnadon Vidhan Sabha segment.

== Economy and infrastructure ==
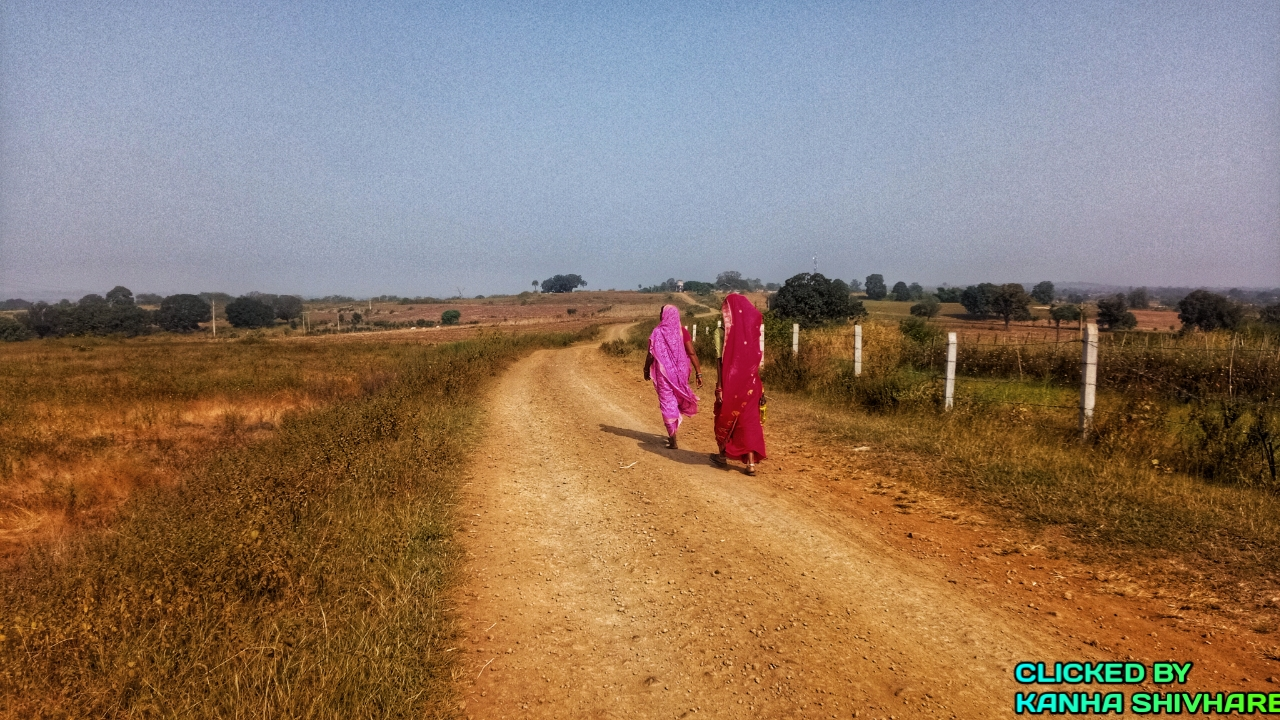
women going to work in the village

Agriculture is the primary economic activity; most workers are cultivators or labourers in local farms. Roads connecting Mehta to Ghansor, Lakhnadon, and Mandla facilitate travel and trade. While a public bus service is available within 10+ km and private buses operate through the village, the nearest railway station is in Ghansor, roughly 11 km away.

== Education and facilities ==
Mehta has several educational institutions providing primary, middle, and higher secondary education. The village has a mix of government and private schools, most of which are under the Tribal Welfare Department. Major schools include the GGMS Mehta (Upper Primary Girls School), GBMS Mehta (Upper Primary Boys School), Jay Shiv Shankar School(class 1st to 8th), GGPS Mehta(girls primary school), GPS Mehta(boys primary school), and Govt. Higher Secondary School, Mehta. These schools provide education from grades 1 to 12. Facilities such as drinking water, and playgrounds are available in some schools, though computer labs and advanced infrastructure are limited.

Basic facilities in Mehta include electricity, road connections, and access to drinking water through wells and handpumps. Transport connections link the village to nearby towns such as Ghansor and Lakhnadon. The nearest railway station is in Ghansor, approximately 11 km away. Health facilities within the village are limited, with residents relying on Community Health Centres and Sub Health Centres in nearby areas.

== Gallery ==
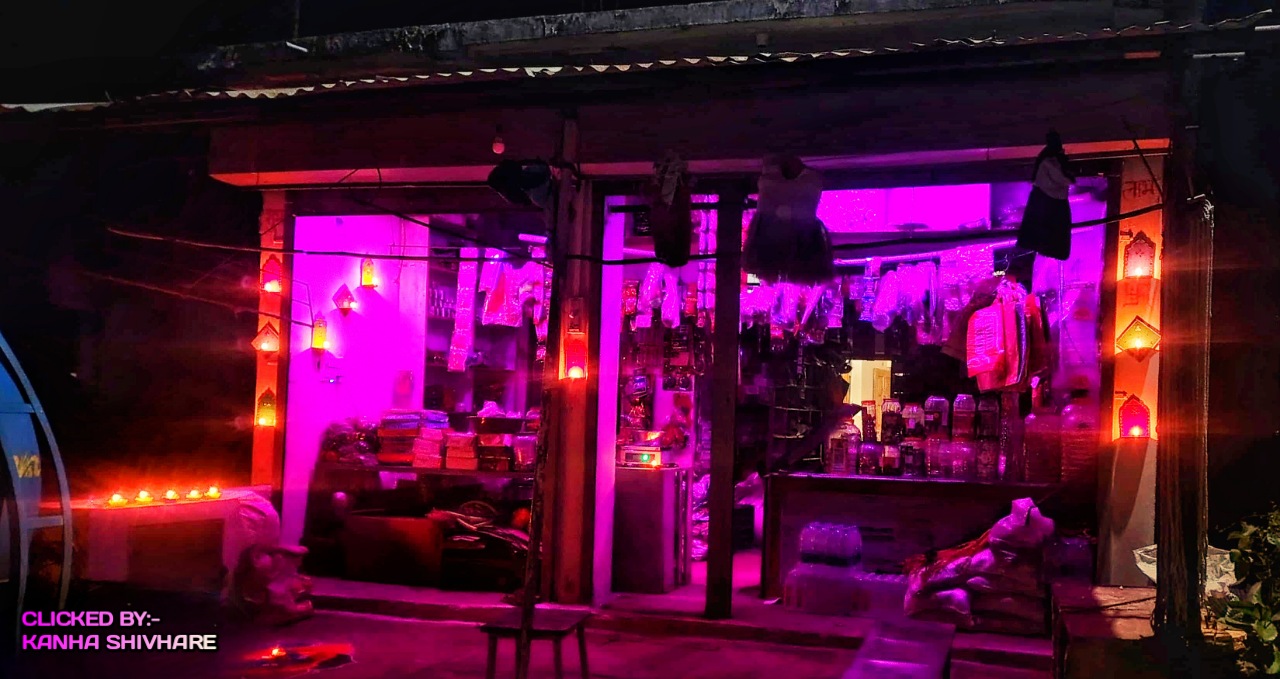
A shop in the village

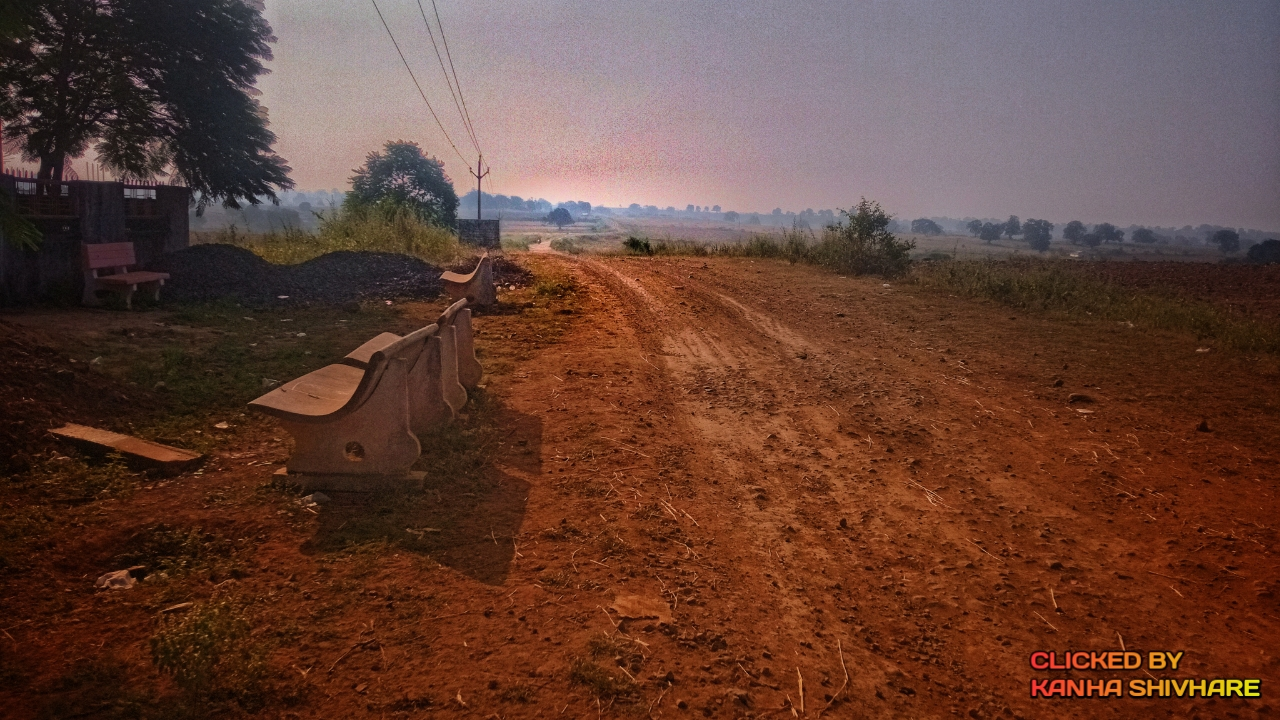
Road towards smaller nearby villages in mehta which is also the south entrance of the village

== See also ==
- Ghansor
- Ghansor railway station
- Seoni
- Jabalpur
