= Kanhiwara =

Village in Madhya Pradesh, India

- Town
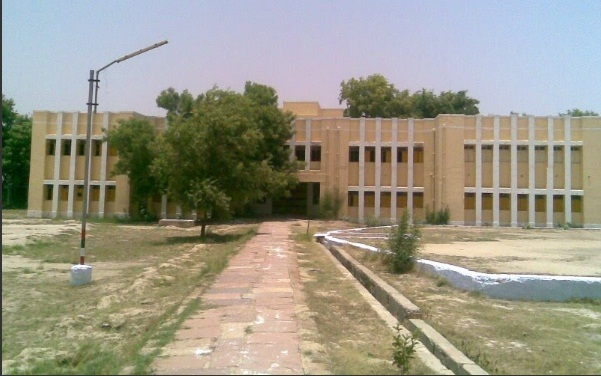
- JNV school

- Location in Madhya Pradesh, India
- Coordinates: 22.20°N 79.74°E

Population (2011)
  - Total: 8,085

Kanhiwara is a town and a Gram Panchayat in Seoni District of Madhya Pradesh it's located 27 km away from Seoni. it's a sub tehsil.

It is also the name of the railway station in Seoni District on the Nainpur-Chhindwara railway.

== Geography ==
Kanhiwara is located on 22.20°N 79.74°E. It has an average elevation of 741 m (2,431 ft. There is also a pond named Phuta Tal in the town. The region is predominantly agrarian. Paddy is mainly cultivated here.

== Demographics ==
As of Census of India 2011 Kanhiwada town has a population of 8,085, of which 4,179 were males and 3,906 were females.

In 2011 literacy rate of Kanhiwada village was 78.61 % . In Kanhiwada Male literacy stands at 84.49 % while female literacy rate was 72.39 %.

== Other Description ==
There is a Jawahar Navodaya Vidyalaya situated in Kanhiwara. it's a sub tehsil. Here's a Police Station in a Town and some rice mills also located in Kanhiwara. 480990 is pin code of Kanhiwara.

== Transportation ==
Kanhiwara is well connected with road. Here's a Major road connects it's from Seoni, Mandla, Jabalpur, and Chhindwara. Daily bus service available in the town.

=== Nearby Town's ===
- Keolari
- Seoni
- Chhapara
- Barghat
- Mandla
- Chhindwara
- Jabalpur
