= Piparwani =

Village in Madhya Pradesh, India

Coordinates: 21.66°N 79.57°E

Piparwani village is located in Kurai Tehsil of Seoni district in Madhya Pradesh, India. It is situated 27 km away from sub-district headquarter Kurai and 60 km away from district headquarter Seoni. As per 2009 statistics, Peeparwani is the gram panchayat of the Piparwani village. The total geographical area of the village is 607.94 hectares.

There are about 629 houses in Piparwani village. Seoni is the nearest town to Piparwani which is approximately 60 km away. The major road that passes through this village is Khawasa-Tirodi road, which connects National Highway 44 (Formerly NH7) and Balaghat-Tumsar road. Piparwani is located near the Seoni-Balaghat district boundary in the south direction.

Piparwani panchayat includes three villages - Piparwani, Paraspani and Dagitola.

== Population and Literacy Rate ==
Piparwani is a large village located in Kurai of Seoni district, Madhya Pradesh with a total of 629 families residing. The Piparwani village has a population of 2,746 of which 1,357 are males while 1,389 are females as per Population Census 2011.

In Piparwani village, the population of children age 0-6 is 328, which makes up 11.94% of the total population of the village. The Average Sex Ratio of Piparwani village is 1,024, which is higher than the Madhya Pradesh state average of 931. The Child Sex Ratio for the Piparwani as per census is 1,037 which is higher than the Madhya Pradesh average of 918.

Piparwani village has a higher literacy rate compared to Madhya Pradesh. In 2011, the literacy rate of Piparwani village was 76.72% compared to 69.32% of Madhya Pradesh. In Piparwani, the male literacy rate stands at 84.78%, while the female literacy rate is 68.82%.

== Educational Facilities ==
List of schools in Piparwani

School name	Classes	Category	Govt/Private Institution	Speciality	Medium
TWD Government Higher Secondary School	9th to 12th	Higher Secondary	Government	Mathematics, Biology, Arts	Hindi
TWD Government Middle School	6th to 8th	Upper Primary	Government		Hindi
TWD Government Primary School	1st to 5th	Primary	Government		Hindi
Saraswati Shishu Mandir	KG-1 to 8th	KG, Primary & Upper Primary	Private		Hindi
Awaken Public School	KG-1 to 5th	Kindergarten	Private		English
