= Quito Fest =

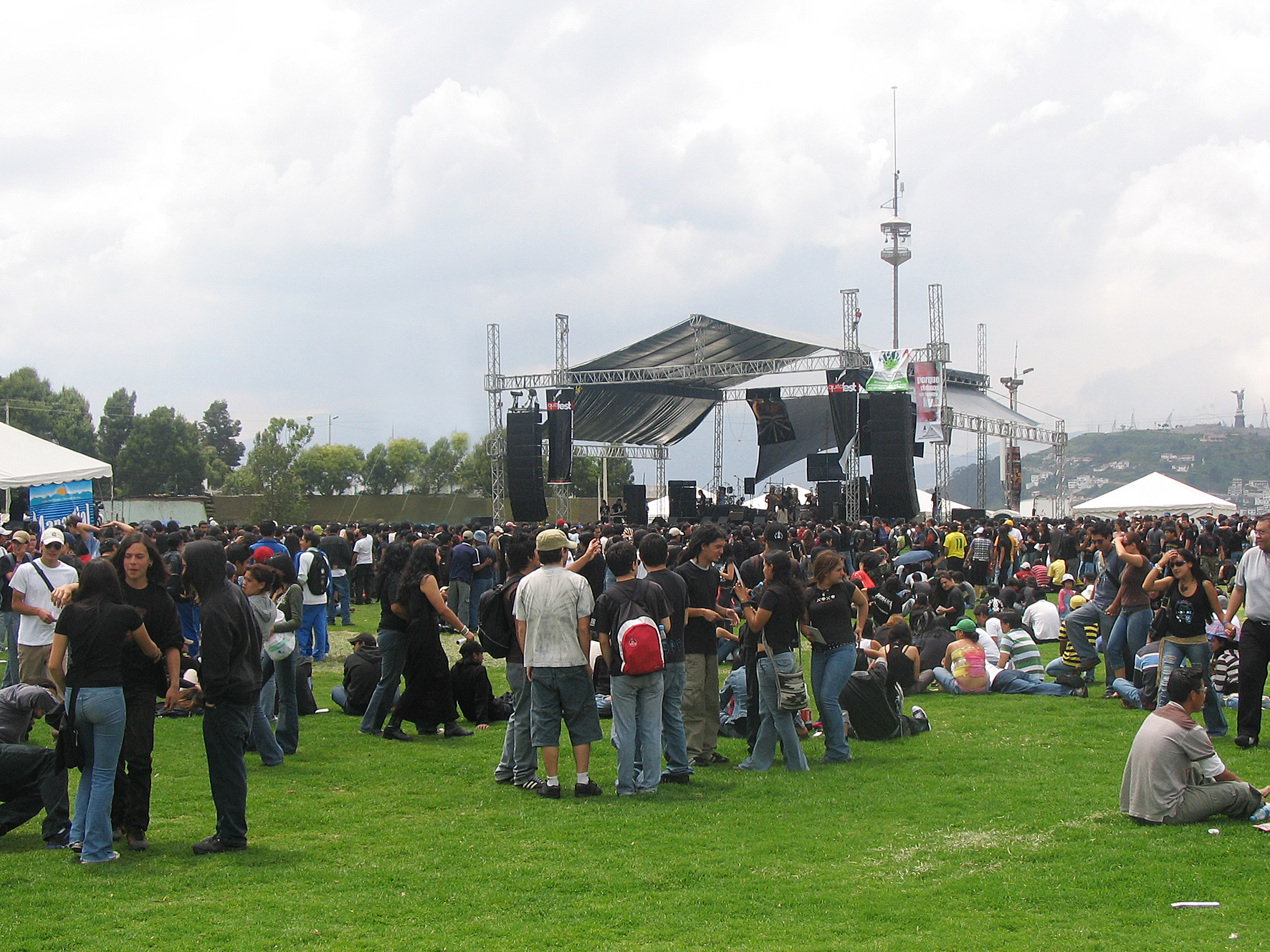
- Dates: September
- Locations: Quito, Ecuador
- Years active: since 2003
- Website: http://www.quitofest.com/

Quito Fest is a yearly, free of charge music festival. It takes place in Quito, Ecuador. Ecuadorian and international bands participate in the festival. During the first years, it took place in the Parque La Carolina but since 2005 it takes place in the Parque Itchimbía as the attendance is larger each year. In 2008, 80,000 persons attended the event.

== Lineups ==
=== 2003 ===
Date: December 5 - December 6

Location: La Carolina Park

Attendance: 3.000

Bands: Kid Cósmico, Mortero, Mamá Vudú, Tanque, Sudakaya, Can Can, Lablú, Rocola Bacalao, Guardarraya, Muscaria, El Retorno De Exxon Valdez.

=== 2004 ===
Date: December 5 - December 6

Location: La Carolina Park

Attendance: 20.000

Bands: Koyi K Utho, Chaos Avatar, Starflam, Sudakaya, Siq, Amigos de lo Ajeno, Cacería De Lagartos, Mortero, Mamá Vudú, Los Zuchos del Vado, 38quenojuega, Rocola Bacalao.

=== 2005 ===
Date: December 4 - December 5

Location: Itchimbia Park

Attendance: 30.000

Bands: Cartel de Santa, Korzus, Immer Fört, De2, Ente, Muscaria, Tzantza Matantza, Guanaco y Dj Zyborg, Tanque, Cacería de Lagartos, Zuchos del Vado, Chulpi Tostado, Siq, Cafetera Sub, Descomunal, Curare.

=== 2006 ===
Location: Itchimbia Park

Attendance: 35.000

Bands: Todos Tus Muertos, Chucknorris, La Caution, Ratos de Porão, Death By Stereo, Masacre, Sal y Mileto, Rocola Bacalao, Fusión Mutágeno, Alicia Se Tiro Por El Parabrisas, Alma Rasta, F415, Madbrain, Curare, Descomunal, Likaon, Total Death.

=== 2007 ===
Date: December 1 - December 2

Location: Itchimbia Park

Attendance: 41.800

Bands: Imposibles, Xtreme Tornamesas, Quito Mafia, Desus Nova, Lax'n'Busto, Messiah, Sarcoma, Funda Mental, Colapso, Paura, Koyi K Utho, Viuda Negra, Basca, Darkest Hour, Suburbia, Guardacan, Tanque, Canaille, Mamá Vudú, El Otro Yo, Sudakaya, Lucybell.

=== 2008 ===
Date: September 19, 20, 21

Location: Itchimbia Park

Attendance: 80,000

Bands: Plastilina Mosh, Amigos Invisibles, Kraken (band), Gondwana (band), Cienfue, La Etnnia, Cephalic Carnage, Eminence, Muscaria, Decapitados, Moortum, Kanhiwara, Asfixia, Alicia se tiro por el Parabrisas, Los Pescados, Los Nietos.

=== 2009 ===
Date: September 11, 12

Location: Itchimbia Park

Bands: Durga Vassago, La Demencia Extrema, The Grief, Brand New Blood, Descomunal, Walls of Jericho, Metamorfosis, Angra, Lado Sur, Humanzee, La PiÑata, Los Mox, Spiritual Lyric Sounds, The Vox, Guerrilla Clika, Austin TV, Can Can, Babasónicos

=== 2010 ===
Date: November 13, 14

Location: Parque Itchimbia

Bands: Krisiun, Carnifex, Basca, Viuda Negra, Curare, Madbrain, Chancro Duro, Romasanta, Cabal, Desorden Publico, El Cuarteto de Nos, Biorn Borg, Alma Rasta, Veda, NIÑOSAURIOS, Miss Goulash, Qm Fan, Monareta, Luis Rueda & Feroz Trio, Veda

=== 2011 ===
Date: - August 12, 13

Location: Itchimbia Park

Attendance: 80,000

Bands: Chernobyl, Réplika, Onírica, Bajo Sueños, Notoken, Confronto, Mortero, Colapso, Testament. Los TXK, The Fever Machine, The Cassettes, Reptil, Cadáver Exquisito, Sobrepeso, Guardarraya, Los Chigualeros, Guanaco MC, Panteón Rococó.

=== 2012 ===
Date: - August 10, 11, 12

Location: Parque Itchimbia

Attendance: 80,000

Bands: CRY, Eutanos, Torture Squad, Muscaria, Mortal Decisión, Black Sun, Custodia, Walking Dead Orchestra, Resistencia, Selva. Rocola Bacalao, El Retorno de Exxon Valdez, Jaime Guevara, Obrint Pas, G.O.E, Ra - La Culebra, Tanque, Biorn Borg, Los Smokings, Lagartija Electrónica. Sudakaya, Kinky, Los Nin, Doctor Krapula, Stich, Rampses, The Liners, Spiritual, La Malamaña.

=== 2013 ===
Date: August 10, 11

Location: Parque Bicentenario de Quito

Attendance: 50,000

Bands: No Te Va Gustar, Dread Mar I, Pulpo 3, Munn, Haga que Pase, Jodamassa, Suburbia, El Extraño, Mamá Vudú, Secta Selecta, Armada de Juguete, Estereo Humanzee. Ente, Hirax, Descomunal, Demolición, Necrofobia, Delicado Sonido del Trueno, Boargazm, Distemia, KOP, Aztra, Murder, Nix.

=== 2014 ===
Date: November 15, 16

Attendance: 15,000

Location: Alejandro Serrano Aguilar Stadium, Cuenca

Bands: Babasónicos, Sobrepeso, Swing Original Monks, Da Pawn, Keko Yoma, Los Corrientes, Barrio Calavera, Ricardo Pita, Radio Fantasma, Yahuarsónicos. Biohazard, Carajo, Curare, La Doble, Los Zuchos del Vado, Absolution Denied, La Bicicleta del Diablo, Decabulla, Da Culkin Klan.

Date: December 6

Location: Itchimbia Park, Quito

Attendance: 5,000

Bands: Sick of it All, Igor Icaza, Guanaco MC, Notoken, Mortal Decisión, PDE, Puño, Barrio Calavera, Don Palabra, Alkaloides.

=== 2015 ===
Date: August 22

Location: Itchimbia Park

Attendance: 20,000

Bands: A.N.I.M.A.L., Muscaria, Atari Teenage Riot, Mundos, Colapso, Los Pericos, La Máquina Camaleön, Mamá soy Demente, Sexores, Van Fan Culo.

=== 2016 ===
Date: August 12

Location: Itchimbia Park

Attendance: 20,000

Bands: Bajo Sueños, Descomunal, Mortal Decisión, 3Vol, Réplika, Kanhiwara, Legión, Kabeza de Lenteja, Oponente Interno, Ciclos.

=== 2017 ===
Date: August 5, 6

Location: Itchimbia Park

Attendance: 7,000

Bands: Café Tacvba, Los Cafres, Swing Original Monks, Sudakaya, Papaya Dada, Ximena Sariñana, Lolabúm, Le Petit Batards. Sepultura, Barón Rojo, Narcosis, Kataklysm, Abadón, 3Vol, Epidemia, Minipony.

=== 2018 ===
Date: September 8

Location: Parque de las Diversidades, Quito

Attendance: 8,000

Bands: Thell Barrio, Movimiento Original, Guardarraya, Total Death, Crossfire, La Vagancia, Ganja Roots, Kolizión, Cuestión de Actitud, The Rude Monkey Bones.

== See also ==
- List of festivals in Ecuador
