= Jhabua Thermal Power Project =

Coal power project in Madhya Pradesh

Jhabua Thermal Power Project at Seoni district in Madhya Pradesh
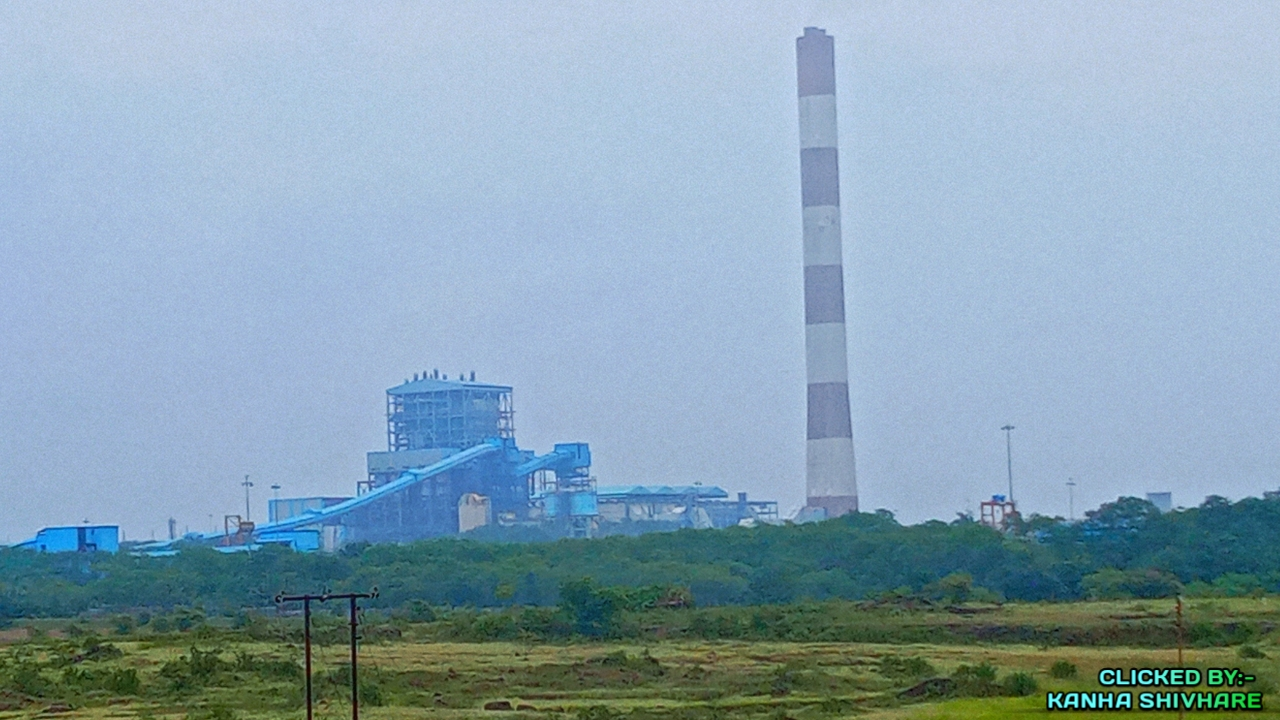
- Jhabua power Plant located at Barela, Seoni district of Madhya Pradesh
- Country: India
- Location: Seoni District, Madhya Pradesh
- Coordinates: 22.737°N 79.911°E
- Status: Unit 1 commissioned
- Commission date: Unit 1: May 2016 'Under implementation' Unit 2: 2017
- Owners: NTPC 50% shareholding and 50% shareholding with lenders
- Operator: NTPC
- Employees: 125

Thermal power station
- Primary fuel: Coal

Power generation
- Units operational: 1*600 MW
- Nameplate capacity: 600 MW

Jhabua Thermal Power Project is a coal based thermal power project located in village Barela – Gorakhpur, in Ghansore tehsil in Seoni district in Indian state of Madhya Pradesh. The power plant is owned by Jhabua Power Limited, a wholly owned subsidiary of Gautam Thapar led Avantha Group. On 5 September 2022, NTPC acquired the Jhabua power through insolvency process.

BHEL is EPC contractor for this power plant. Coal for the power plant is sourced from South Eastern Coalfields.

== Capacity ==
Its planned capacity is 1260 MW (1x600, 1x660 MW).

Unit Number	Capacity (MW)	Date of Commissioning	Status
Unit 1	600	2016 May	Running.
Unit 2	660		Proposed
