= Kurai, Seoni =

Town in Madhya Pradesh, India

Kurai
- Village
- Location in Madhya Pradesh, India
- Coordinates: 21.80°N 79.50°E
- Country: India
- State: Madhya Pradesh
- District: Seoni District

Languages
  - Official: Hindi
- PIN: 480880
- Vehicle registration: MP 22

Kurai is a village and tehsil in Seoni District of Madhya Pradesh, India. According to the 2011 census of India, it had a population of 1927.

== Geography ==
Kurai is located on 21.80°N 79.50°E, in the Satpura mountain range.

== Notable places ==
- Mundara, Mundara is the origin of Wainganga River, it is 17 km from Kurai.
- Sukhtara, Sukhtara is a major village in Seoni District, with a domestic airstrip. It's 20 km away from Kurai.
- Khawasa, is a major place in Seoni District where the main gate of Pench Tiger Reserve is, and the Maharashtra and Madhya Pradesh border. It is 25 km away from Kurai.
- Piparwani
