= Pench National Park =

National park in Madhya Pradesh, India

- IUCN category II (national park)
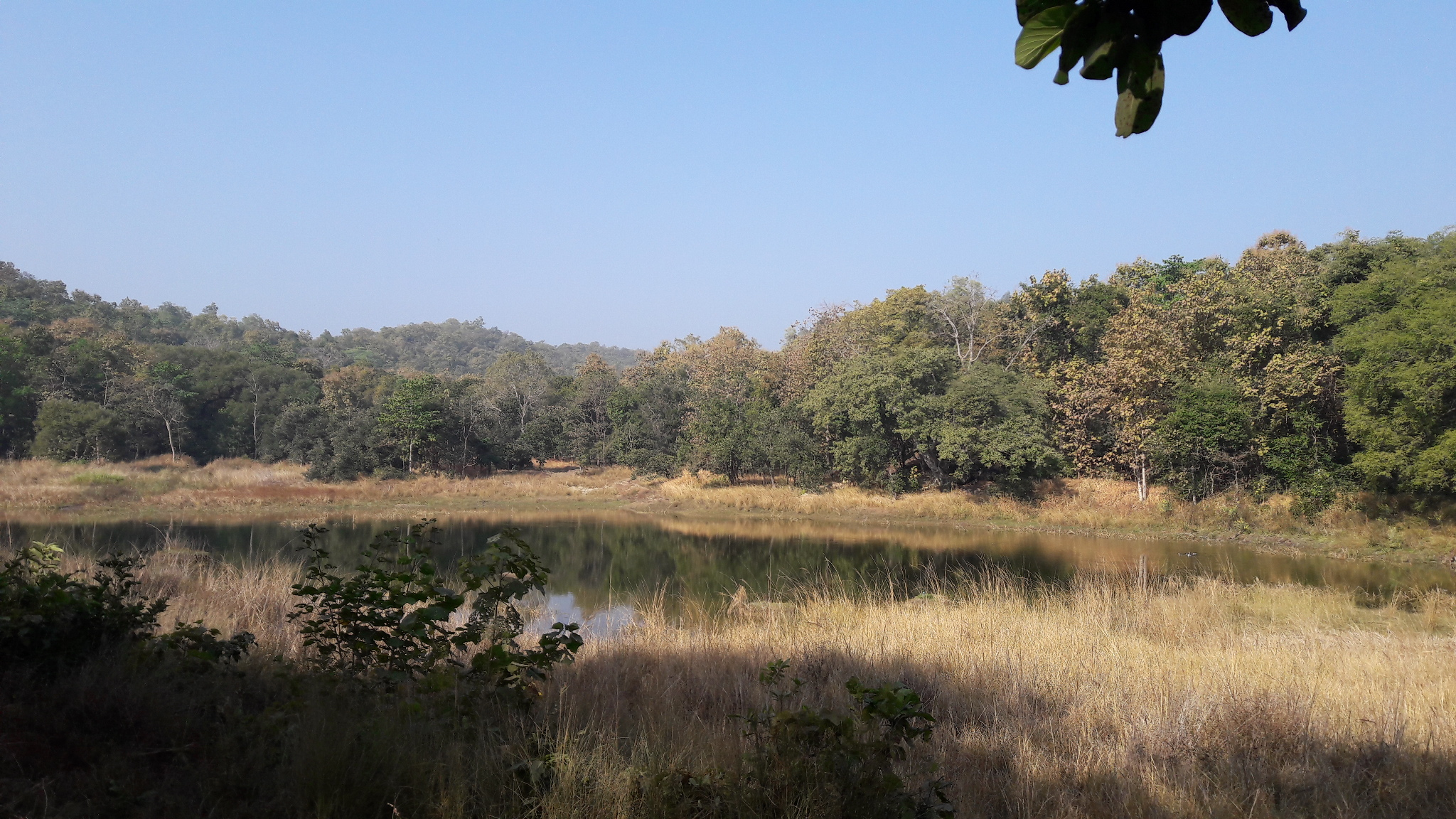
- Landscape in Pench National Park

- Location within Madhya Pradesh Location within Maharashtra Location within India
- Interactive map of Pench National Park
- Location: Seoni District and Chhindwara district, Madhya Pradesh, India
- Nearest city: Seoni
- Coordinates: 21°40′17.76″N 79°18′11.88″E
- Area: 292.85 km^{2} (113.07 sq mi)
- Established: 1977 as wildlife sanctuary; 1983 as national park
- Governing body: State Forest Department
- Website: penchnationalpark.in

Pench National Park is a national park in the Indian state of Madhya Pradesh. It was created in 1983 with an area of 292.85 km^{2} (113.07 sq mi) in the Seoni and Chhindwara districts. Since 1992, the park has formed part of the core of the Pench Tiger Reserve, together with Pench Mowgli Sanctuary. The wider reserve also includes a substantial buffer area.

== Geography ==
Pench National Park encompasses 292.85 km^{2} (113.07 sq mi) in the Seoni district and Chhindwara district of Madhya Pradesh. The Pench River and numerous small streams flow through the national park, which forms the core area of Pench Tiger Reserve. The temperature in this region varies from −2 °C (28 °F) in winter to 49.5 °C (121.1 °F) in summer, and mean yearly rainfall is 1,400 mm (55 in). Its elevation ranges from 425 to 620 m (1,394 to 2,034 ft).

== Vegetation ==
The forest in the park consists of dry deciduous forests, and the tree includes teak mixed with other species like saja, bijiayasal, lendia, haldu, dhaora, salai, amla, amaltas, mahua, and white kulu. The ground is covered with a maze of grasses, plants, bushes, and saplings. Bamboo is also found at places.

== Wildlife ==
Pench National Park is home to diverse flora and fauna, which includes over 40 species of mammals, 13 species of reptiles, and more than 210 bird species. It hosts snake species such as cobras, pythons, and the Indian krait.

=== Mammals ===
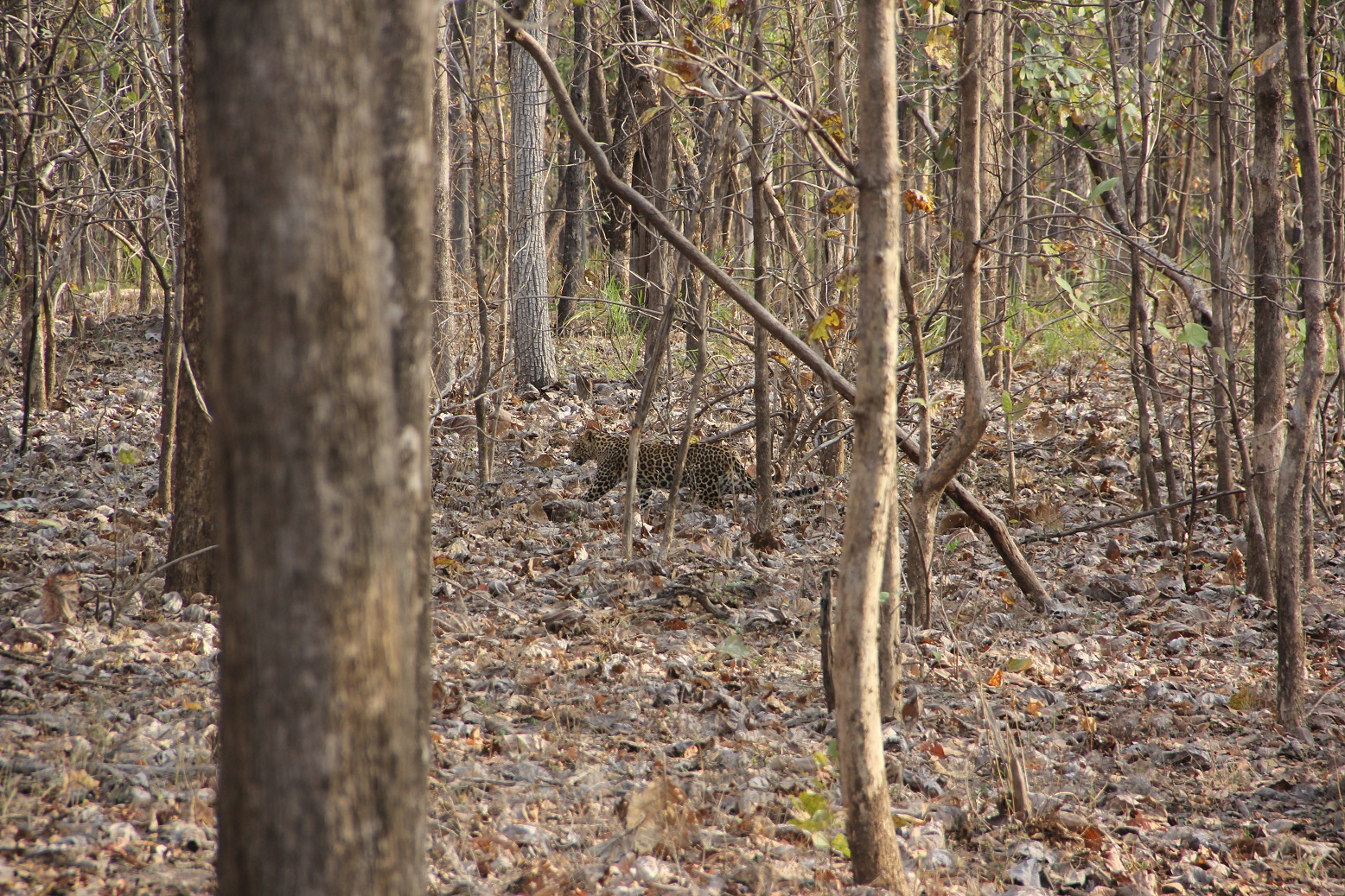
A leopard in Pench forest

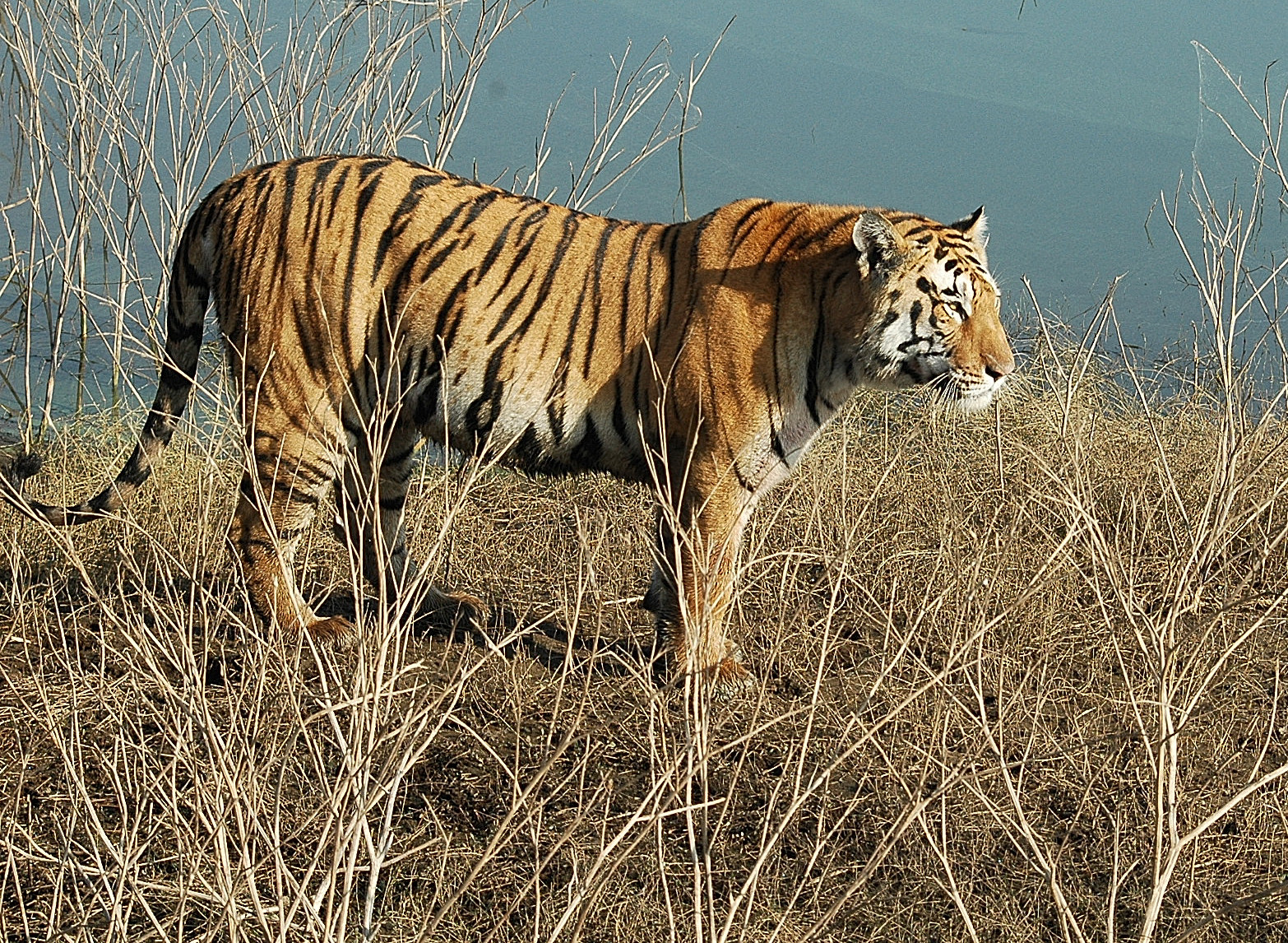
A tiger in Pench National Park

Mammal species in Pench National Park include Bengal tiger, Indian leopard, golden jackal, dhole, sloth bear, chital, sambar, northern red muntjac, four-horned antelope, gaur, nilgai, chinkara, wild boar, common langur, Rhesus monkey, Indian hare and Indian porcupine.

=== Birds ===
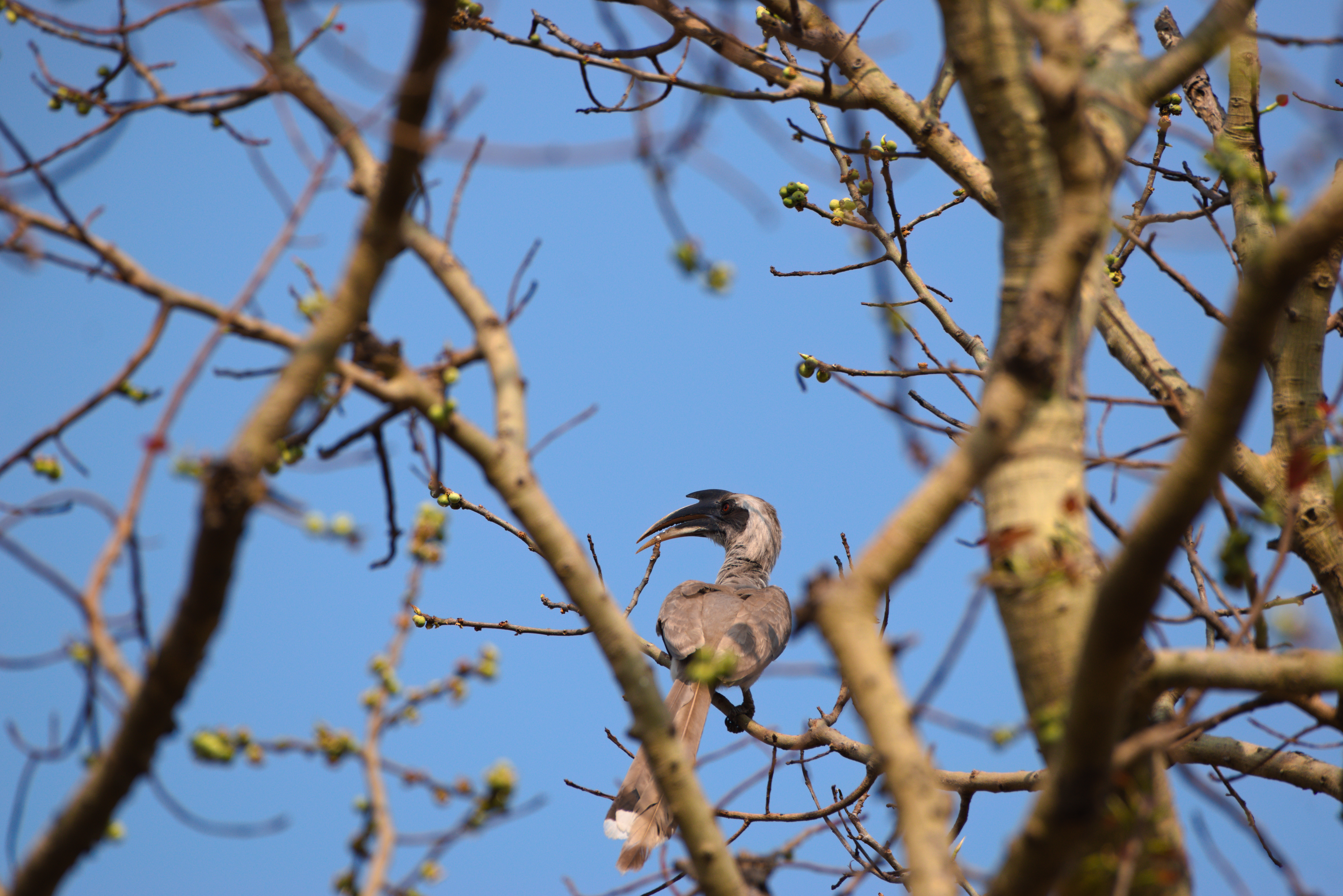
Indian grey hornbill in the tree

Pench National Park harbours more than 210 bird species including several migratory ones. Some of them are Indian peafowl, junglefowl, Indian vulture, crow pheasant, crimson-breasted barbet, red-vented bulbul, racket-tailed drongo, Crested serpent eagle, Nisaetus cirrhatus, Indian roller, magpie robin, lesser whistling teal, northern pintail, shoveller, egrets and herons, minivet, oriole, wagtail, munia, myna, waterfowl and common kingfisher.

== In popular culture ==
Pench National Park is one of many places that may have inspired Rudyard Kipling's The Jungle Book.

The national park served as a filming location for the BBC documentary series Tiger: Spy in the Jungle, narrated by David Attenborough.
