= Dhanora, Seoni =

Tehsil of Seoni district, Madhya Pradesh, India

Dhanaura
- Village
- Location in Madhya Pradesh, India
- Coordinates: 22°30′N 79°48′E

Dhanora is a tehsil of Seoni district, Madhya Pradesh, India. This administrative division has 3500 inhabitants.

== Richhariya Baba Dhanora ==
There is a very famous, historical and religious temple of Richaria Baba in Dhanaura, where a huge fair is held for 15 days after Diwali.
