= Dhuma =

- Town
- Location in Madhya Pradesh, India
- Coordinates: 22.75°N 79.72°E
- Country: India
- State: Madhya Pradesh
- District: Seoni District

Languages
  - Official: Hindi
- PIN: 480888
- Vehicle registration: MP 22

Dhuma is a town and a Gram Panchayat in Seoni District of Madhya Pradesh. Its pin code is 480888.

Dhuma is located on 22.75°N 79.72°E. It has an average elevation of 582 metres (1,909 feet).

As of 2011 census, Dhuma has a population of 5,314, of which 2,770 are males while 2,544 are females.
