= Bandul =

Bandul بندول
- Village
- Location within Iran
- Coordinates: 35°19′11″N 46°15′35″E
- Country: Iran
- Province: Kurdistan
- County: Sarvabad
- Bakhsh: Central
- Rural District: Dezli

Population (2006)
  - Total: 396
- Time zone: UTC+3:30 (IRST)
  - Summer (DST): UTC+4:30 (IRDT)

Bandul (Persian: بندول, also Romanized as Bandūl; Sorani Kurdish: بندۆڵ, romanized: Bindoł; also known as Bandol) is a village in Dezli Rural District, in the Central District of Sarvabad County, Kurdistan Province, Iran. At the 2006 census, its population was 396, in 87 families. The village is populated by Kurds.
