= Seoni district =

Coordinates: 22°05′24″N 79°33′00″E

- District of Madhya Pradesh
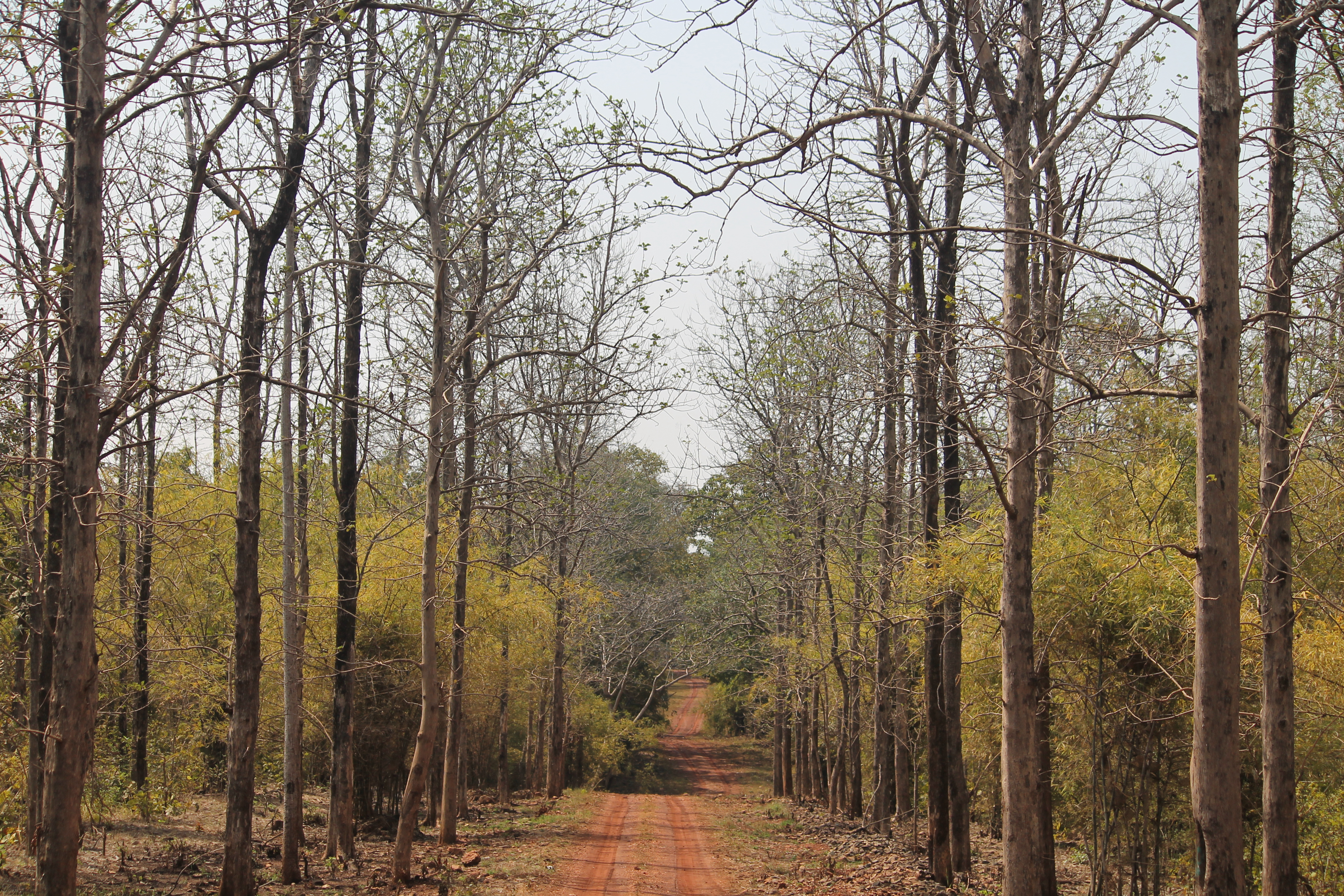
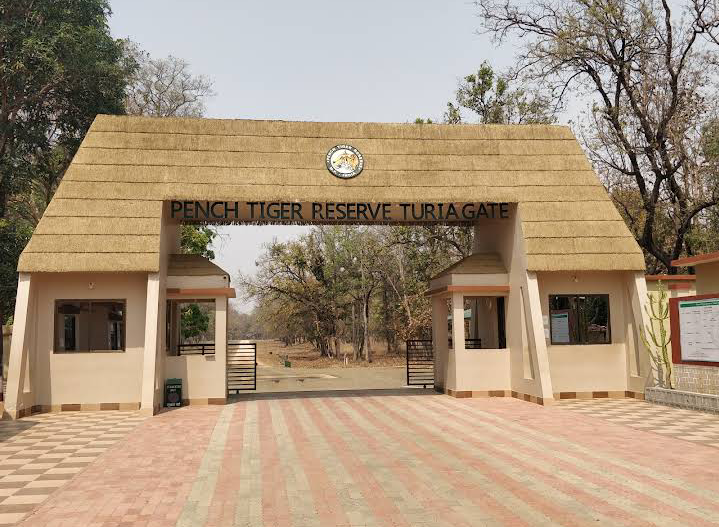
- Pench National Park

- Location of Seoni district in Madhya Pradesh
- Country: India
- State: Madhya Pradesh
- Division: Jabalpur
- Headquarters: Seoni

Government
  - District Magistrate: Smt. Sheetla Patle IAS
  - District Police Chief: Shri Sunil Kumar Mehta, IPS

Area
  - Total: 8,758 km^{2} (3,381 sq mi)

Population (2011)
  - Total: 1,379,131
  - Density: 157.5/km^{2} (407.8/sq mi)

Demographics
  - Literacy: 91.16 per cent
  - Sex ratio: 984
- Time zone: UTC+05:30 (IST)
- Average annual precipitation: 1384 mm
- Website: seoni.nic.in, seoni.mppolice.gov.in

Seoni district is an administrative district in the southeastern part of the Indian state of Madhya Pradesh. The district headquarters is located in the city of Seoni, Madhya Pradesh. The district is known for its rich biodiversity, its location in the Satpura hill ranges, and for its connection to Rudyard Kipling’s The Jungle Book.Seoni District is in southeastern Madhya Pradesh, India.

== History ==
The district was created as a separate District in the newly created Chief Commissioner's Province in 1861, but was merged with the adjoining Chhindwada District in 1931. The District was, however, revived on the day the new state of Madhya Pradesh was created viz 1 November 1956. The name of the district originated from the word 'Seona' (Gudina arborea), a species of tree commonly found in the area.

An early copper inscription found in Seoni is a land grant from Vakataka king Pravarasena II in the 3rd century CE. Although the region where the land grant was given is not indicated, more copper plates found in Nagpur, Chhindwara and the Ajanta Caves also indicate the region would have been under Vakataka rule. Later it was speculated the Satpura range was briefly part of the Gaur kingdom of Kshatriya (Rajputs). Afterwards the region most likely passed to the Kalachuris with capital at Tewar in Jabalpur district, who ruled from the 9th to 12th centuries. The Chandels of Mahoba then most likely ousted the Kalachuris, evidence being oral histories that cite Chandel generals as having captured the Seoni region to take a Kalachuri princess.

The first recorded historical records begin with the Gond Garha-Mandla kingdom. The forts of Ghansor, Chauri and Dongartal and the territory around them, which make up the majority of modern-day Seoni district, were included in the territory of Sangaram Shah in 1530. The Gonds fought against the Mughals and retained their independence, but paid tribute to the Mughals regardless.

In the late 17th century, the Raja of Mandla Narendra Shah asked fellow Gond king Bakht Buland Shah of Deogarh to help suppress a rebellion of two Afghan captains, Azim Khan and Lunde Khan. At Pratappur near Seoni, the two kings defeated the adventurers and Narendra Shah ceded the territory now part of Seoni district to Bakht Buland Shah. Bakht Buland Shah gave the Dongartal region to Raj Khan, an Afghan adventurer, as governor. He also put his relative Raja Ram Singh in charge of Seoni region, who built a fort at Chhapara. Raj Khan took part of modern Bhandara district, presumably at the instigation of Bakht Buland Shah. In 1743, Raghoji Bhosle of Nagpur took over Deogarh kingdom, including Seoni district. Raj Khan died the same year, but his son Muhammad Khan continued to hold Seoni in the name of the Raja of Deogarh for three years. Raghoji offered Muhammad Khan the entirety of Seoni to govern if he relinquished the part of Bhandara he conquered, which he accepted. Muhammad Khan moved to Chhapara and administered the region as a diwan until his death in 1759. During one of his absences in Nagpur, the Raja of Mandla took over Chhapara but Khan quickly drove him out and established the Wainganga and Thanwar as borders of the two kingdoms. During the Bhosale period Seoni came under Nagpur kingdom and many Jagirdari was given to Powars who mostly settled in Barghat, Seoni and Keolari regin of district. In 1774 his grandson Muhammad Amin Khan moved his headquarters to Seoni. Chhapara was twice sacked by the Pindaris and greatly reduced in size. Gonds also regularly attacked the district, and due to his inability to control them Amin's son Muhammad Zamin was recalled as Diwan and replaced by Bengaji Bhatoni. Although he tried to regain his hereditary land in Dongartal, Zamin died and his widow received a village near Seoni Modern Bori Kalan. A Kharak Bharti Gosain was then given the government of the region by Raghoji but proved to be so oppressive the revenue fell and many areas were depopulated. In 1818, after the Battle of Sitabuldi in the Third Anglo-Maratha War, Seoni was given to British control. At first the district was administered by officers reporting to Jabalpur, then to the British resident at Nagpur. The British raised a police force to counter Gond attacks and made landlords responsible for security of the roads.

During the 1857 rebellion, a Lodhi landlord in the north of the district rebelled. However most of the landlords, including the erstwhile Diwan family of Khans, supported the British.

== Geography ==
Seoni is in southeastern Madhya Pradesh in the Mahakoshal region and is bordered by Jabalpur district on the north, Narsinghpur and Chhindwara districts to the west, Nagpur district of Maharashtra to the south and Balaghat and Mandla districts to the east. Seoni district forms part of the Satpura tableland. It is largely covered with forest. The district is remarkable for the beauty of its scenery and the fertility of its valleys.

The northern and western portions include the plateaus of Lakhnadon and Seoni; the eastern section consists of the watershed and elevated basin of the Wainganga; and in the south-west is a narrow strip of rocky land known as Dongartal. The plateaus of Seoni and Lakhnadon vary in height from 1,800 to 2,000 ft.; they are well cultivated and clear of jungle, and their temperature is always moderate and healthy.

Geologically the north part of Seoni consists of trap hills and the south of crystalline rock. The soil of the plateaus is the rich black cotton soil formed by disintegrated trap, of which about two-thirds of the district are said to consist; but towards the south, where cliffs of gneiss and other primitive formations occur, the soil is siliceous and contains a large proportion of clay.

The chief river is the Wainganga, with its affluents the Sagar, Theli, Bijna and Thanwar; other streams are the Timar and the Sher, tributaries of the Narmada. The annual rainfall averages 53 in. The main crops grown in Seoni are rice, wheat, maize, chickpea (gram), and soybean.

It extends over an area of 8,758 km^{2}.

== Administration ==
Seoni district is divided into eight tehsils:

- Barghat
- Chhapara
- Dhanora
- Ghansor
- Keolari
- Kurai
- Lakhnadon
- Seoni Rural
- Seoni Nagar
- Kanhiwara (Sub Tehsil)

There are a total of 1579 villages in the district under 645 Gram Panchayats. There are also six revenue divisions: Seoni, Lakhnadon, Ghansor, Keolari, Barghat, Kurai.

== Economy ==
In 2006 the Ministry of Panchayati Raj named Seoni one of the country's 250 most backward districts (out of a total of 640). It is one of the 24 districts in Madhya Pradesh currently receiving funds from the Backward Regions Grant Fund Programme (BRGF).

Railway connectivity to Seoni has enhanced the agricultural import-export business from Seoni. The Seoni railway station and its goods yard serves as an important hub for agricultural exports. There are some rice and sugar mills in Seoni District. The district is also known for the Stone Crusher mill, which serves as a major source of income.

Jhabua Thermal Power Project is a coal based thermal power project operated by NTPC. Its planned capacity is 1260 MW (1x600, 1x660 MW).

Bhurkalkhapa Industrial Area, This industrial area is located near Seoni, where many small industrial units are operating. It is multi-product industrial area with total land of 676.9 hectares.

== Demographics ==
Historical population
Year	Pop.	±% p.a.
1901	328,281	—
1911	396,165	+1.90%
1921	348,871	−1.26%
1931	393,732	+1.22%
1941	423,333	+0.73%
1951	434,061	+0.25%
1961	523,741	+1.90%
1971	668,352	+2.47%
1981	809,713	+1.94%
1991	1,000,831	+2.14%
2001	1,166,608	+1.54%
2011	1,379,131	+1.69%

According to the 2011 census, Seoni District has a population of 1,379,131, roughly equal to the nation of Eswatini or the US state of Hawaii. This gives it a ranking of 355th in India (out of a total of 640). The district has a population density of 157 inhabitants per square kilometre (410/sq mi). Its population growth rate over the decade 2001-2011 was 18.2%. Seoni has a sex ratio of 984 females for every 1000 males, and a literacy rate of 73.01%. 11.88% of the population lives in urban areas.

The major hindu castes include Ahir, Powar, Brahmin, Rajput, Lodhi, Kunbi, Teli etc.

Scheduled Castes and Scheduled Tribes made up 9.48% and 37.69% of the population respectively. Gonds make up nearly 90% of the ST population and constitute 33.71% of the population.

Religions in Seoni district (2011)
Religion	Percent
Hinduism	83.03%
Other (tribal religion)	9.81%
Islam	5.78%
Buddhism	0.53%
Other or not stated	0.85%

Hindus make up 83.03% of the population, Muslims are 5.78%. Other religions (mainly various names for traditional Adivasi religion like Koya Punem) make up 9.81% of the population. Other significant populations are 7,300 Buddhists and 4,900 Jains.

Languages of Seoni district (2011)
1. Hindi (86.8%)
2. Gondi (6.91%)
3. Powari (1.83%)
4. Marathi (1.77%)
5. Urdu (1.36%)
6. Others (1.37%)

At the time of the 2011 Census of India, 86.76% of the population in the district spoke Hindi, 6.91% Gondi, 1.83% Powari, 1.77% Marathi and 1.36% Urdu as their first language.

As per 2001 census, Seoni district had a total population of 1,165,893, out of whom 588,135 were males and 577,758 were females. During the decade 1991-2001 population growth rate was 16.49 per cent. The Sex ratio was 982. The density of population was 133 / km^{2}.

== Culture ==
Rudyard Kipling's Jungle Book is set in the Seoni district (spelled Seeonee in the books).

== Tourist places ==
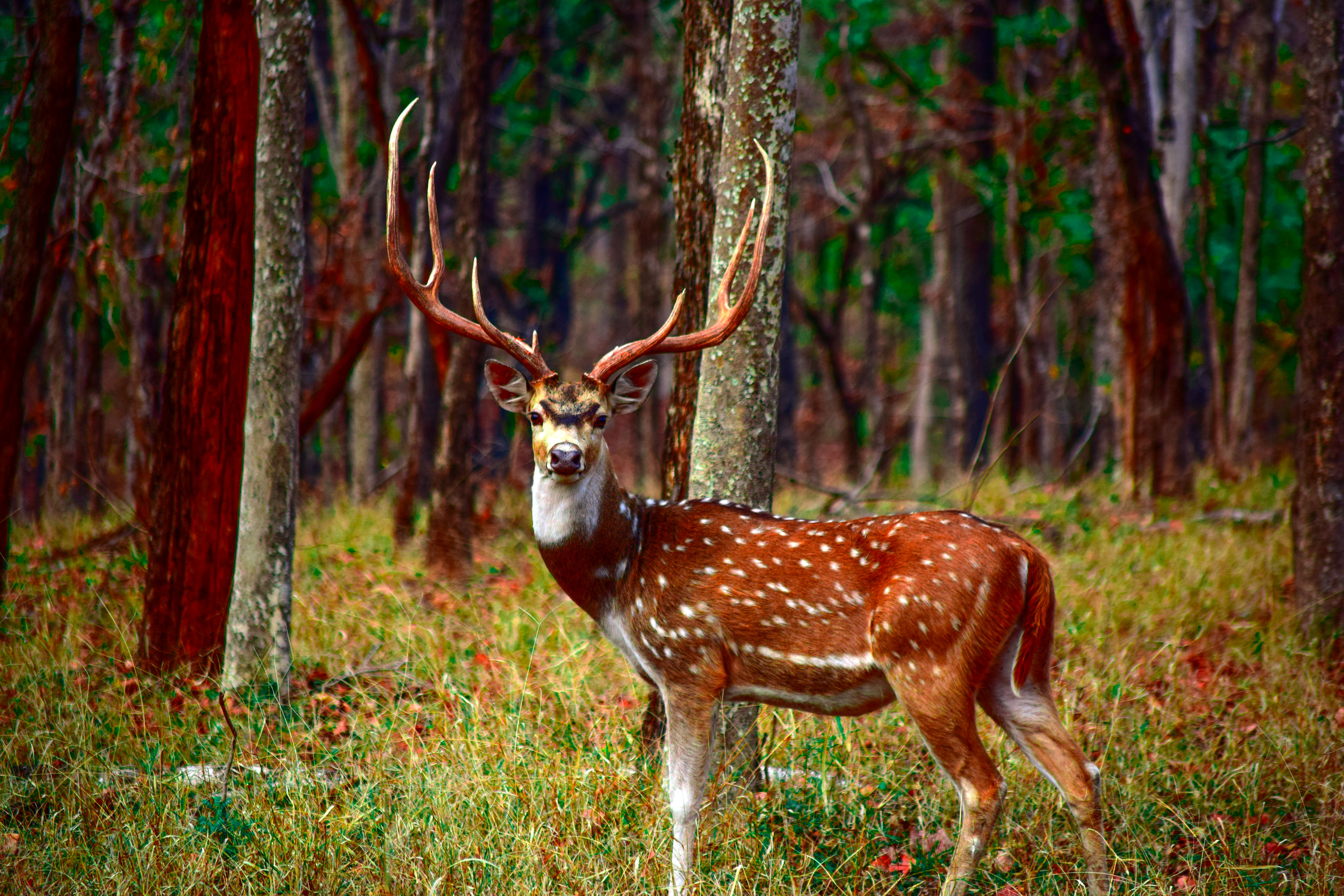
Pench National Park

- Richhariya Baba Dhanora
- Pench Tiger Reserve
- Mundara (Wainganga Origin)
- Bheemgarh Dam
- Shri Kala Bhairava Nath Swami Temple, Adegaon

=== Pench Tiger Reserve ===
The River Bainganga's source is located beneath the village Mundara, where it includes for example the Pench Tiger Reserve within 10 km. The Pench Tiger Reserve is named after the Pench River, which flows from north to south through the reserve, and is located in the southern reaches of the Satpura hill ranges in the Seoni and Chhindwara districts. The terrain is undulating, with most of the area covered by small hill ranges, steeply sloping on the sides. The Pench National Park is named after the Pench River, which flows from north to south through the park. This river constitutes the district boundary of Seoni and Chhindwara districts of Madhya Pradesh in the upper region and State boundary with Maharashtra State in the lower region. This area became the 19th tiger reserve of India in 1992. The tourist traffic is experiencing fast growth in this park. The Pench National Park which constitutes the core of the tiger reserves was notified in the year 1983. The total area of the park is 292.85 km^{2}. The total area of the Pench Tiger Reserve is 757.85 km^{2} (292.61 sq mi). The reserve is situated in an area that holds a significant place in the natural history of Central India. Descriptions of its flora and fauna have appeared in wildlife books dating back to the 17th century. Books written in the 19th and early 20th century by naturalists like Captain J. Forsyth and Rudyard Kipling's Jungle Book cover the panorama of nature's abundance in this tract. A forest belt extends in three directions: north, east and south, covering forest tracts of Seoni, Balaghat and Nagpur districts. The contiguous forest on the southern side in the Maharashtra state of India, initially named Pandit Jawaharlal Nehru National Park has been recently included in the Project Tiger network under the same name as this reserve. A dam was constructed on the Pench River on south-eastern boundary of the reserve.

The area is criss-crossed by numerous seasonal streams and "nalas". The Pench River flowing through the central line of the reserve is dry by the end of April but a number of water pools locally known locally as "dohs" are found, which serve as waterholes for wild animals. A few perennial springs also exist in this area. However, the water sources are not suitably distributed, hence large area remains unused by the wild animals. The Pench reservoir at the center of the reserve is the only major water source during pinch period.

As the prey concentration is high along the Pench River, tigers usually inhabit this belt. Leopards, though, generally operate in the peripheral areas but are occasionally seen in deep forests also. Jungle cats are commonly seen. Leopard cats, small Indian civet and palm civet are common but seen very rarely.

Wild dogs are commonly seen in packs of 12 to 15, near Chhedia, Jamtara, Bodanala and Pyorthadi areas of the reserve. Wild boars are ubiquitous. Sloth bears occupy the hilly, rocky outcrops and favour mahul bel-infested forest. Chinkara are present in very small numbers and are found in open areas around Turia, Telia, and Dudhgaon villages. Jackals are seen occasionally near Tekadi, Alikatta and Chhindimatta villages.

== See also ==
- Mehta (village)
- Ghansor
- Kanhiwara
- Dhuma
- Bandol
