= Bandol, Seoni =

Bandol बंडोल
- village
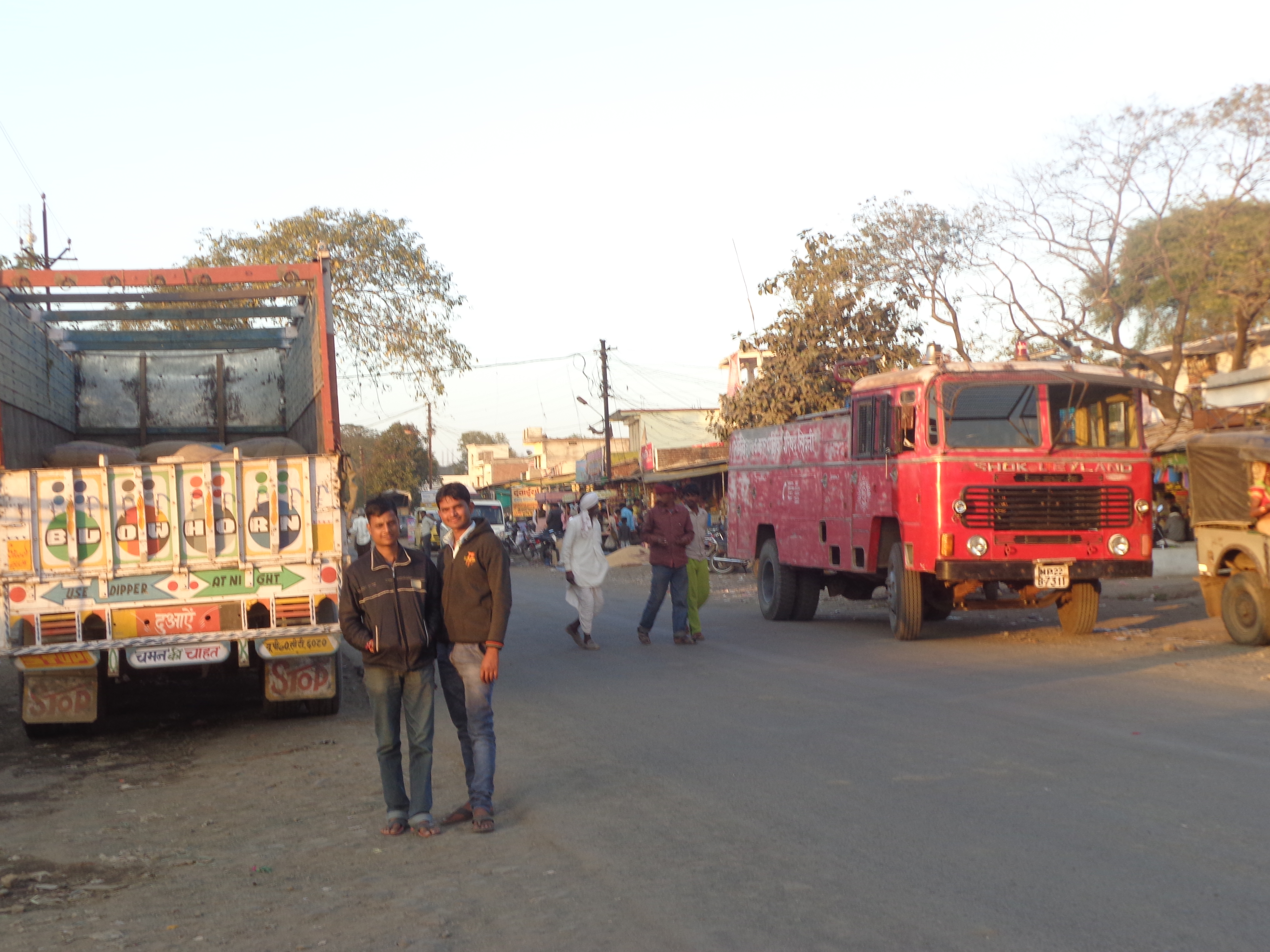
- Bandol bus stand

- Location in Madhya Pradesh, India Bandol (India)
- Coordinates: 22.23°N 79.54°E
- Country: India
- State: Madhya Pradesh
- District: Seoni
- Named for: Sarpanch Shrinevas (Pappu) Murti

Government
  - Body: Gram Panchayat

Population
  - Total: 5,000

Languages
  - Official: Hindi
- Time zone: UTC+5:30 (IST)
- PIN: 480882
- Telephone code: 07692
- Vehicle registration: DOES NOT HAVE A RTO
- Website: Prakash_Satnami

Bandol Panchayat (Hindi: सिवनी) बंडोल is a village in the Seoni district of Madhya Pradesh State, India. It belongs to the Jabalpur Division. Bandol is located 16 kilometres north of National Highway No. 7. The village is the geographic area of 706.95 hectares, mostly a large gram panchayat. The Wainganga river flows 2 kilometres west of Bandol village .

== Stone Crusher Industrial Area ==
Stone crusher is the highest in this area. These stone crushers are supplied in the surrounding areas. Stone is the most supplied in Balaghat district.

== Educational Institute ==
- Primary School
- Government Secondary School Bandol
- Government Medil School Bandol
- Pre Matric Scheduled Tribes Hostal Bandol
- Saraswati Shishu Mandir School Bandol
- Cypress Public School Bandol/Kuklah
- Saraswati Gyan Mandir School Bandol
- Balveer Public School Bandol (CBSE)
- Dehradun Public School Bandol (CBSE)

== Temples ==
- Katyani Mandir Temple
- Gram Devi Mandir
- Bhura Bhagat Temple
- Old Shankar Mandir Main Road Temple
- Hanumaan Temple Bazar Bandol
- Banjari Temple

== Government Primary Health Center. (Hospital) ==
The government primary health center is Bandol which is located in Bakhari Road Bando

Dr Mayank tiwari also giving his service in main road bandol

== Animal Feed Plant ==
It is the only animal feed plant in Seoni district, which is established here with Sanchi Milk Cold Center.

== Government Offices ==
- Police Station Bandol
- Gram Panchayat Office
- Poorv Kshetra Vidyut Vitaran Center Bandol (MPEB DC Office Bandol)
- Forest Office
- Animal Hospital
- Gramin Bank
- Sahkari Bank
- RI Office
- Aganwadi Centre 1,2
- Seva Sahkari Samiti Bandol
- Post Office
