= Bheemgarh Dam =

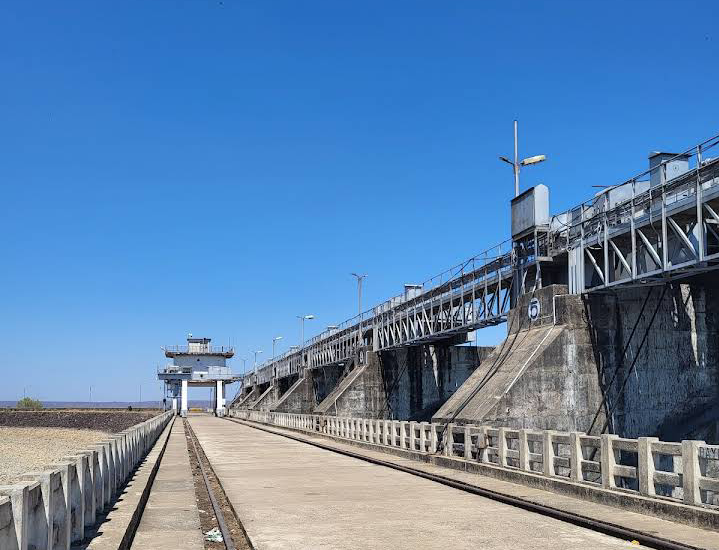

- Location within India
- Official name: Upper Wainganga dam
- Country: India
- Location: Seoni, Madhya Pradesh
- Coordinates: 22.3761089°N 79.661879°E
- Purpose: Irrigation For Balaghat & Seoni District apart Drinking Water for Seoni, fisheries & Industries
- Status: completed
- Construction began: 1972
- Opening date: 1984-85 partially open
- Construction cost: 14988.2 Lacs
- Owner: Water Resources Dept.M.P.

Dam and spillways
- Type of dam: Earthen
- Impounds: Wainganga River
- Height: Maximum 42.67 meter
- Length: 3,871 m (12,700 ft)
- Dam volume: 5070 lacs cubic metre
- Spillway capacity: It has sluice Gates.Size is 15.24 MX10.67 M X 10 Nos.It discharge 16700 Cubic Meter per Second. Spillway length 279.81 M

Reservoir
- Creates: Sanjay Sarovar
- Total capacity: 5070 Lacs Cubic Meter
- Active capacity: 4100 Lacs Cubic Meter
- Inactive capacity: 970 Lacs Cubic Meter
- Catchment area: 2007.75 Square Kilometre
- Surface area: 5536.087 hector
- Maximum length: Dam length 3.87 K.M.
- Maximum water depth: Dam lowest water level 506.27 M from MSL & 523.34 M Top level from MSL
- Normal elevation: Maximum height 42.67 Meter

Power Station
- Commission date: 2X 1200KW on main canal
- Irrigable command area covered 81839 Hector;Total agriculture command area 136305 hector, Yearly irrigation capacity 105253 Hector

Bheemgarh dam or Bhimgarh, officially the Upper Wainganga (Sanjay Sarovar) Dam, is built across the Wainganga river in Chhapara tehsil of Seoni district of Indian state of Madhya Pradesh.

The structure is 3,871 m long.

The Bhimgarh Sanjay Sarovar Dam is located 43 km away from the Seoni. It is bounded by mountains from all sides.

In recent years, the reservoir has failed to fill.

== External references ==
- "Photo of Bheemgarh Dam". 12 April 2016. Archived from the original on 21 July 2016.
- "Photo of Bheemgarh Dam". 20 August 2010. Archived from the original on 21 July 2016.
- "Photo of Bheemgarh Dam walkway". 20 August 2010. Archived from the original on 4 March 2016.
