= Chhapara =

Town in Madhya Pradesh, India

Seoni Chhapara
- Town
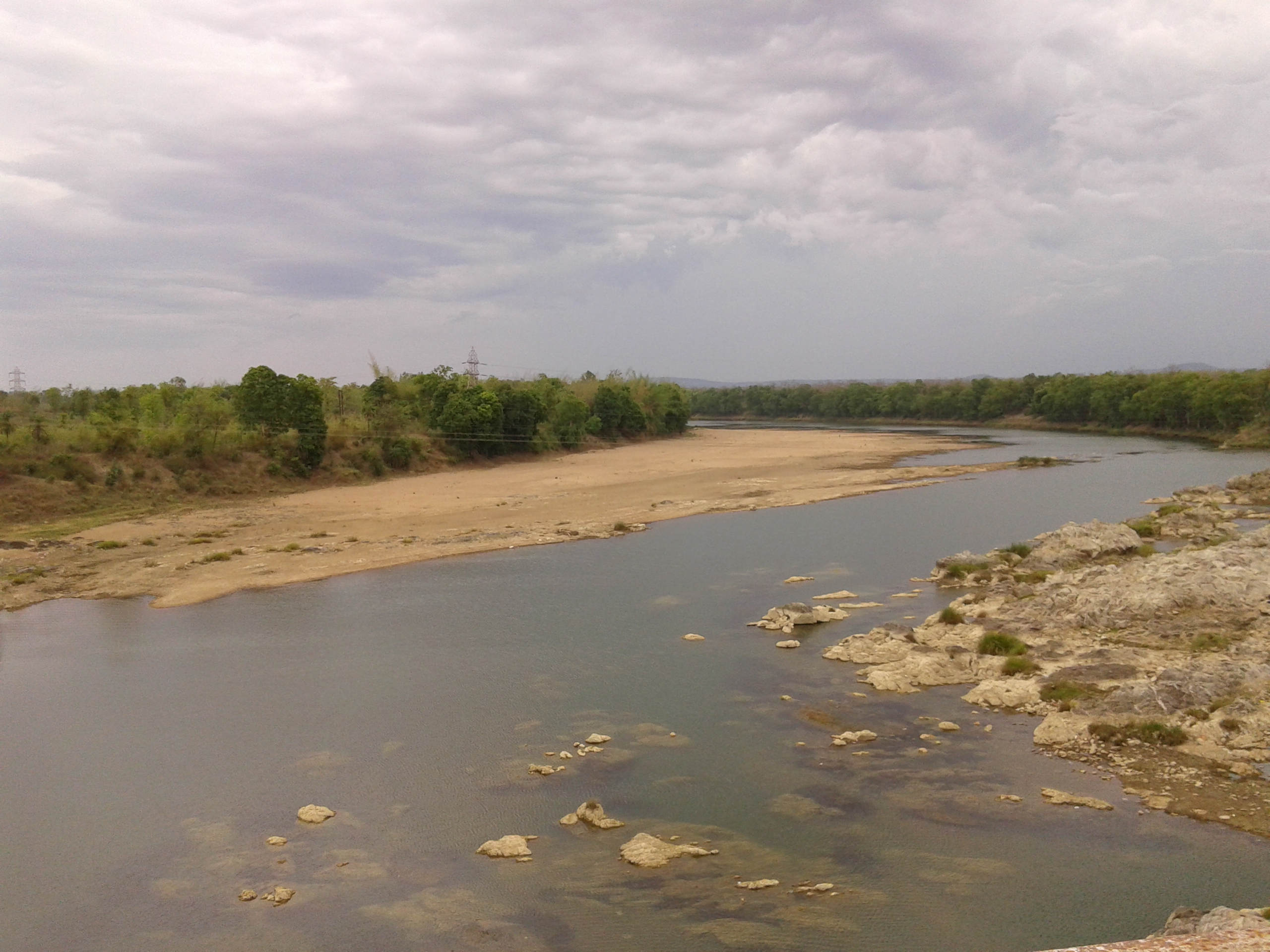
- Wainganga River Near Chhapara

- Location in Madhya Pradesh, India
- Coordinates: 22.39°N 79.54°E
- Country: India
- State: Madhya Pradesh
- District: Seoni District

Government
  - Type: Nagar panchayat

Population (2011)
  - Total: 15,371

Languages
  - Official: Hindi
- PIN: 480884
- Vehicle registration: MP 22

Chhapara or Seoni Chhapara is a town and a Nagar Panchayat in Seoni District of Madhya Pradesh, India.

== History ==
Chhapara was part of the Gond and Maratha kingdoms. It was one of the garhi of Maratha kingdom. Bakht Buland Shah gave the Dongaratal region to Raj Khan, an Afghan adventurer, as governor. He also placed his relative Raja Ram Singh in charge of Seoni region, who built a fort at Chhapara. Raj Khan took part of modern Bhandara district.

== Geography ==
Chhapara is located on 22.39°N 79.54°E. It has an average elevation of 741 m (2,431 ft). It is about 35 km (22 mi) from Seoni.

The Wainganga river flows through Chhapara.

== Population ==
Chhapara has a population of 15,371 of whom 7,844 are males while 7,527 are females as per a report released by Census India 2011.

== Administration ==
Chhapara is a tehsil headquarter and a development block. There are 157 villages in this tehsil.

Chhapara is a Nagar Panchayat city in district of Seoni, Madhya Pradesh. Chhapara city is divided into 15 wards for which elections are held every 5 years.

== Tourism in Chhapara ==
- Wainganga River
- Bheemgarh Dam Chhapara
- Banjari Devi Temple Chhapara
- Chhapara Garhi

== Transport ==
Chhapara is located on NH 44. It is well connected by road and is linked to Seoni, Jabalpur, Lakhnadon, Mandla and Narsinghpur. A number of buses ply from Chhapara.
