= Barghat =

- Town
- Location in Madhya Pradesh, India Barghat (India)
- Coordinates: 22.03°N 79.72°E
- Country: India
- State: Madhya Pradesh
- District: Seoni
- Elevation: 537 m (1,762 ft)

Population (2011)
  - Total: 12,100

Languages
  - Official: Hindi
- Time zone: UTC+5:30 (IST)
- PIN: 480667
- Telephone code: 07692-250...
- ISO 3166 code: IN-MP
- Vehicle registration: MP-22
- Climate: Aw

Barghat is a town and a Nagar Parishada in Seoni district in the a state of Madhya Pradesh, India. It has an average elevation of 537 metres (1,761 feet).

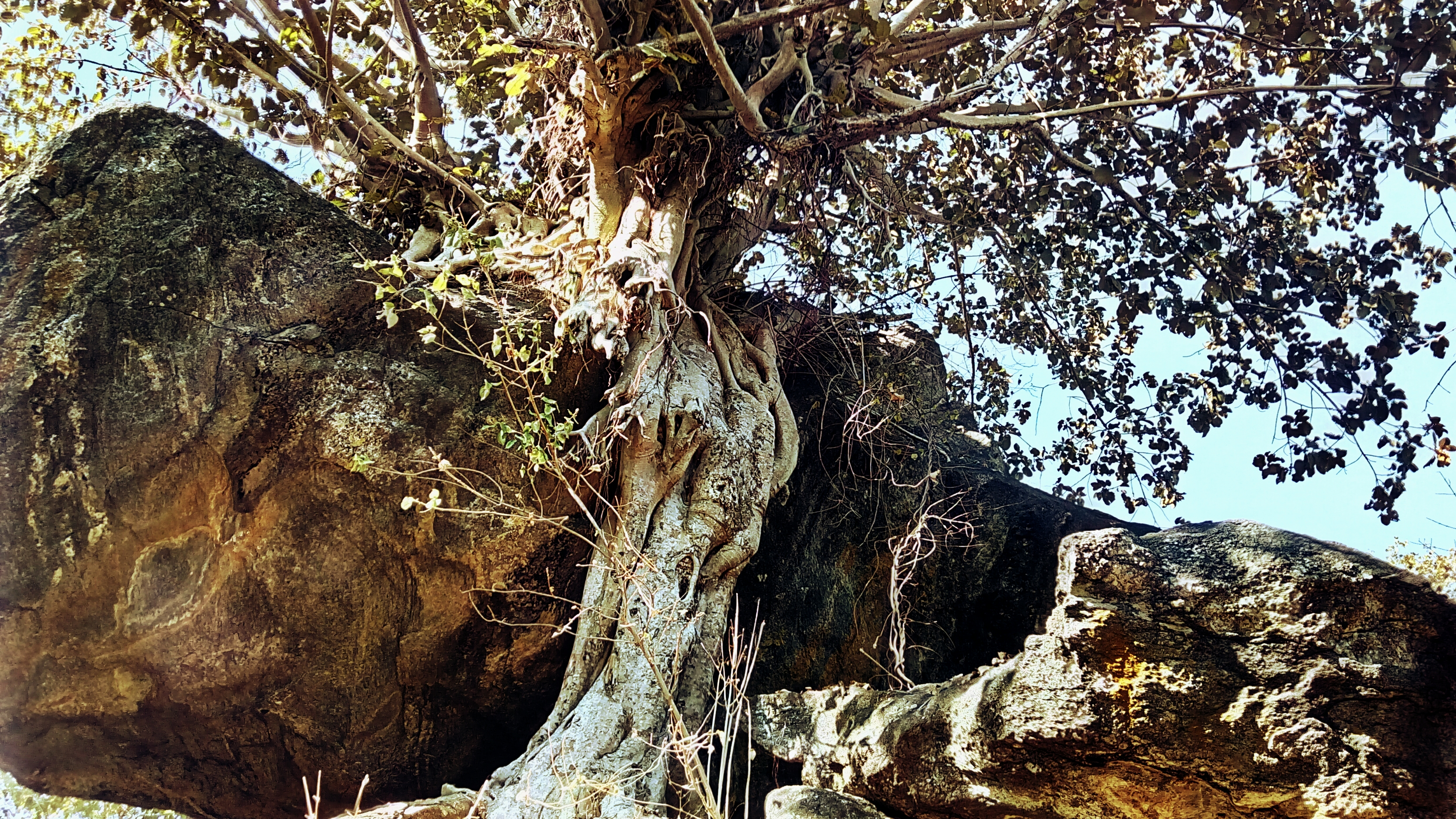

== Demographics ==
As of the 2001 India census, Barghat had a population of 20,000, with males constituting 51% and females 49%. Barghat has an average literacy rate of 73%, higher than the national average of 59.5%; with 56% of the males and 44% of females literate. 13% of the population is under 6 years of age.

== Education and sports ==
There are government and privately owned educational institutes. Some of them are:

-Government Degree College Barghat

-Govt ITI College Barghat. – Shri Ram ITI college

Now Barghat is setting to develop in a proper way as sports and sports ground are there such as – Takkar singh stadium, here state championship is being organised (don't confuse with Ranji). -indoor stadium

== Tourist Places ==
1. Chandiya Pahar
2. Morcha Devi
3. Salhe Dam
4. Manegaon Tample
5. Bandarjhiriya
