= Lakhnadon =

- Municipal Council
- Lakhnadon
- Nickname: Jahilabad
- Location in Madhya Pradesh, India Lakhnadon (India)
- Coordinates: 22.6°N 79.6°E
- Country: India
- State: Madhya Pradesh
- District: Seoni
- Founder: Shah Mahmud
- Named for: •Lakhnadon on the name of erstwhile ruler Maharaja Lakhan Kunwar •Jahilabad name given by Mughal Governor Shah Mahmud

Government
  - Type: Municipality
  - Body: Town council
  - Mayor: Meena Balram Golhani
  - Member of the Legislative Assembly: Yogendra Singh "Baba"
- Elevation: 607 m (1,991 ft)

Population (2011)
  - Total: 22,000
- Demonym(s): Adivasi & Ahir

Languages
  - Official: Hindi
- Time zone: UTC+5:30 (IST)
- PIN: 480886
- Telephone code: 07690
- ISO 3166 code: IN-MP
- Vehicle registration: MP22
- Climate: Cwa
- Sex ratio: 938 ♀ / 1000 ♂

Lakhnadon also called as Jahilabad is a Municipal Council Nagar parishad Seoni district in the Indian state of Madhya Pradesh, and the headquarters of Lakhnadon janpad and tehsil.

It is best known for its sagon wood, tendu leaves, and its pure khoya.

It is one of the oldest tehsils of Madhya Pradesh and is the second biggest town in Seoni district.

== Etymology ==
According to local belief, Lakhnadon gets his name from its mythical ruler Maharaja Lakhan Kunwar.

However, There is no archeological or anthropological evidence of existence of Maharaja Lakhan Kunwar and his family. It is a folklore created by locals.

Lakhnadon was also known as Jahilabad. This name was given by famous Mughal Governor Shah Mahmud Because of the illiterate population. Islamic Invaders called illiterates as Jahil and their town called Jahilabad.

== History ==
In Mughal Era, Governor Shah Mahmud developed the town primarily. He developed resources for daily livelihood like digging wells and making canals for water, irrigation, etc. He also developed horse routes for means of communication. He built mosque and graveyard for Muslims and ritual of gifting The Holy Qur'an to non-Muslims was also started by him.

In British Era, British Officers laid down the foundation of Education & Health. They started elementary schools and Civil Hospital also called as Mission Hospital. That hospital still exists in present-day and gives treatment to poor and needy persons at a very nominal cost.

== Geography ==
Lakhnadon has an average elevation of 607 metres (1991 feet). It is just a little far from the geographical centre of the Indian sub-continent. It lies in the southwest of Jabalpur and north of Seoni and also neighbours Narsinghpur by its west. It is surrounded by sagon and tendu trees that cover the town from all sides.

== Demographics ==
As per 2011 India census, the total population of Lakhnadon (urban area) is 17,302, of which 8,930 are males and 8,372 are females. Thus, the average sex ratio of Lakhnadon is 938, lower than the national average of 943. Furthermore, the literacy rate in Lakhnadon is 86.2%, which is higher than those of Seoni (72.1%) and India (74.04%). Specifically, in Lakhnadon, the male literacy rate is 90.4%, and the female literacy rate is 81.82%. The population as per religion gets a demographic change due to conversion by Islamic and Christian missionaries funded by foreign.

Religions in Lakhnadon
Religion	Percent
Hindu	70.37%
Muslim	15.63%
Jain	06.48%
Christian	05.40%
Buddhist	02.12%
demographic data of population on religious base

== Tourism ==
The tourist attractions in and around Lakhnadon include the Gaytri Shaktipeeth, Nehru park, Siddhbaba, Ranital, Chilachond dam, and Banjari temple. Ram Mandir and Hanuman Mandir are two of the oldest temples of Lakhnadon which were built on land donated by Shri Girdhari Lal and his son Shri Jugal Kishore Beohar and latterly renovated by Pandit Ram Shankar Shukla. Mathghogra, is also an important place of interest for forest tourism approximately 5 km from Lakhnadon toward tola village. Math Ghogra is popular for shiva temple located inside a dark cave surrounded by a small waterfall and holy pond. The town is reachable by Road or Railway. The Nearest Airport is Jabalpur Airport.
