= Sher River =

River in Madhya Pradesh, India

Sher River Sher
- Indian River Map

Location
- Country: India
- State: Madhya Pradesh
- Tributary: Umar river, Kanera River

Physical characteristics
- Source: Satpura Range
  - location: Patan, Seoni district
- Mouth: Narmada River
  - location: Sangon Ghat Narsinghpur District
  - coordinates: 23°05′N 79°01′E
- Length: 129 km (80 mi)
- Basin size: 2,901 sq. km.

The Sher River is a left tributary of the Narmada River in India. It flows in Seoni district and Narsinghpur district of Madhya Pradesh.

== See also ==
- Narmada River
- List of rivers of Madhya Pradesh
