= Katangi, Jabalpur =

Town in Jabalpur, India

Katangi
- Town
- Location in Madhya Pradesh, India
- Coordinates: 23.44°N 79.79°E
- Country: India
- State: Madhya Pradesh
- District: Jabalpuur
- Tehsil: Patan

Government
  - Type: Nagar Panchayat

Population (2011)
  - Total: 19,040
- Vehicle registration: MP 20

Katangi is located in Jabalpur District of Madhya Pradesh. It is a Nagar Parishad. Katangi is located on Damoh Jabalpur Road. Its pin code is 483105.

== Geography ==
Katangi is located on 23.44°N 79.79°E. Katangi has an average elevation of 442 metres (1,450 feet). Katangi is located on Damoh Jabalpur Road. Hiran River (Madhya Pradesh) flows near Katangi.

== Demographics ==
Katangi Nagar Panchayat has population of 19,040 of which 9,896 are males while 9,144 are females as Census India 2011. In Katangi Nagar Panchayat, the female sex ratio is 924 against state average of 931. Moreover, the child sex ratio in Katangi is around 886 compared to Madhya Pradesh state average of 918. The literacy rate of Katangi city is 77.55%, higher than the state average of 69.32%. In Katangi, male literacy is around 85.42% while the female literacy rate is 69.10%.

== Description ==
Katangi is famous for Nidan Waterfall and Katangi ke rasgulle. Many people visit this place.
