= Shakkar River =

Shakkar River Shakkar
- Indian River Map

Location
- Country: India
- State: madhya Pradesh
- City: Amarwara, Gadarwara
- Tributary: Harad, Sitarewa

Physical characteristics
- Source: Satpura range
  - location: Sukri Chhindwara district
- Mouth: Narmada River
  - location: Sokalpur Narsinghpur District
  - coordinates: 23°01′N 78°40′E
- Length: 150 km (93 mi)
- Basin size: 1,541 sq. km.

The Shakkar River is a left tributary of the Narmada River in the state of Madhya Pradesh in central India. It originates from Chhindwara District. Shakkar River mainly flows in Chhindwara and Narsinghpur District.

The Shakkar River passes through 23.0°N 78.41°E and joins the Narmada River near Gadarwara.

== See also ==
- Narmada River
- List of rivers of Madhya Pradesh
