= Hiran River (Madhya Pradesh) =

Hiran River Hiran
- Indian River Map

Location
- Country: India
- State: madhya Pradesh
- City: Kundam, Sihora, Katangi

Physical characteristics
- Source: Vindhya-Kaimur range
  - location: Kundam Jabalpur district
- Mouth: Narmada River
  - location: Sankal Narsinghpur District
  - coordinates: 23°06′N 79°20′E
- Length: 188 km (117 mi)
- Basin size: 4,792 sq. km.

Hiran is a river in Madhya Pradesh in India. Hiran is a tributary of Narmada River. It's Flowed in Jabalpur District.

== Description ==
Hiran River flows in Mahakaushal region. It originates from Kundam town in Jabalpur district. Katangi and Sihora town are also located on the banks of Hiran river.

The Hiran River flows primarily through the Jabalpur district, passing through areas such as Kundam, Sihora, Indrana, Katangi, and Belkheda; it serves as a major water source for the region, meeting agricultural and drinking water needs. On the border of Narsinghpur and Jabalpur district it joins Narmada River.

== See also ==
- Narmada River
- List of rivers of Madhya Pradesh
