= Barna Dam =

- Location within India
- Country: India
- Location: Bari tehsil in Raisen district, Madhya Pradesh
- Coordinates: 23°03′04.91″N 078°03′45.13″E
- Status: Operational
- Opening date: 1978

Dam and spillways
- Type of dam: Gravity
- Impounds: Barna River
- Height: 47.7 m (156 ft)
- Length: 432 m (1,417 ft)
- Elevation at crest: 352.7 m (1,157 ft)
- Width (crest): 4.6 m (15 ft)

Reservoir
- Total capacity: 539,000,000 m^{3} (437,000 acre⋅ft)
- Active capacity: 455,800,000 m^{3} (369,500 acre⋅ft)
- Catchment area: 1,176 km^{2} (454 mi^{2})

The Barna Dam is a gravity dam on the Barna River in Badi tehsil Raisen district, Madhya Pradesh, India. Barna river is a major tributary of the Narmada River. It is about 100 km (62 mi) east of Bhopal. The dam was constructed by Madhya Pradesh Water Resource Department. The primary purpose of the dam is irrigation and it was completed in 18.oct.1978.
