= Kaveri River (Madhya Pradesh) =

Kaveri
- Location of the Kaveri-Narmada confluence

Location
- Country: India
- State: Madhya Pradesh

Physical characteristics
- Mouth: [Narmada River]
  - location: Near Omkareshwar
  - coordinates: 22.231973°N 76.170469°E
  - elevation: 173 m
- Length: 40 km (25 mi)
- Basin size: 954 km^{2} (368 mi^{2})

Basin features
- River system: Narmada

The Kaveri is a tributary of the Narmada River in Madhya Pradesh, India. It has a length of 40 km, and a catchment area of 954 km^{2}.

The Kaveri river meets the Narmada river near Mandhata (Omkareshwar), around 882 km from the Narmada's source. The Narmada Mahatmya texts, which glorify the Narmada river, extol the confluence (sangam) of Narmada and Kaveri as a holy place (tirtha). Along with its bigger namesake in the south, the Kaveri river of Madhya Pradesh has been mentioned in the Matsya and the Kurma Puranas.

The Matsya and the Padma Puranas declare:

The junction of the Kaveri and Narmada is famed throughout the world; it destroys all sins; one should bathe there because the Kaveri is very sacred and the Narmada is a great river; whatever benefit a man may gain between the Ganges and Yamuna (that is, at Prayaga), the same accrues to him when he bathes at the Kaveri-sangama.

According to the Matsya Purana, Kubera performed a tapas in honour of Shiva at the confluence of Kaveri and Narmada, which made him the lord of yakshas. The Kurma Purana also similarly praises the confluence, declaring that it destroys guilts. It recommends that one should bathe and worship Shiva at this confluence. The Agni Purana also mentions a Kaveri sangama, which F. E. Pargiter identifies with the Kaveri-Narmada confluence.
