= Kundam =

Tehsil in Jabalpur District

- Town
- Location in Madhya Pradesh, India
- Coordinates: 23.21°N 80.34°E
- Country: India
- State: Madhya Pradesh
- District: Jabalpur District

Government
  - Type: Janpad panchayat

Population (2011)
  - Total: 4,856
- Vehicle registration: MP 20

Kundam is a Census Town City and a Tehsil headquarter located in Jabalpur District of Madhya Pradesh.

It lies in the Mahakoshal region.

== Geography ==
Kundam is located on 23.21°N 80.34°E. It has an average elevation of 381 metres. Hiran River is originates from here. 483110 is pin code of Kundam town. Kundam is located on NH 45.

== Description ==
Kundam is located on Jabalpur-Shahpura-Dindori Road. Kundam is a small town and many service available here. Interesting places in the town is kundeshwar Shiv Temple. Many kundas available here. Hiran river origin from here.

== Villages ==
1. Baghraji
2. Lakhanwara
3. Harduli

== Transportation ==
Kundam is located on NH 45. It's connected Jabalpur and Dindori with Kundam. Kundam is 45 km away from Jabalpur. Daily buses runs from here.
