= Narmada River =

River in central India

Narmada
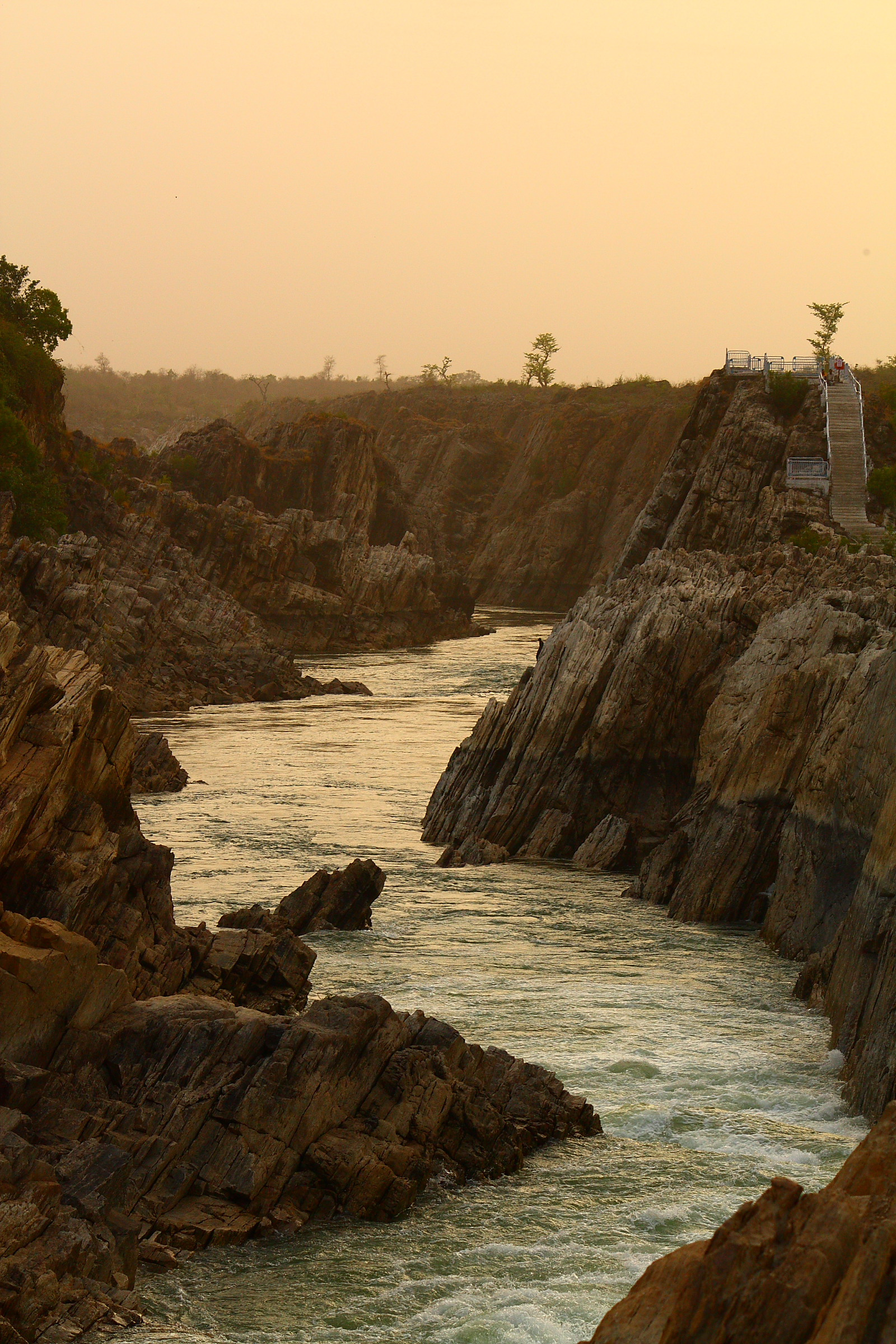
- Narmada River at Bhedaghat, Jabalpur, India

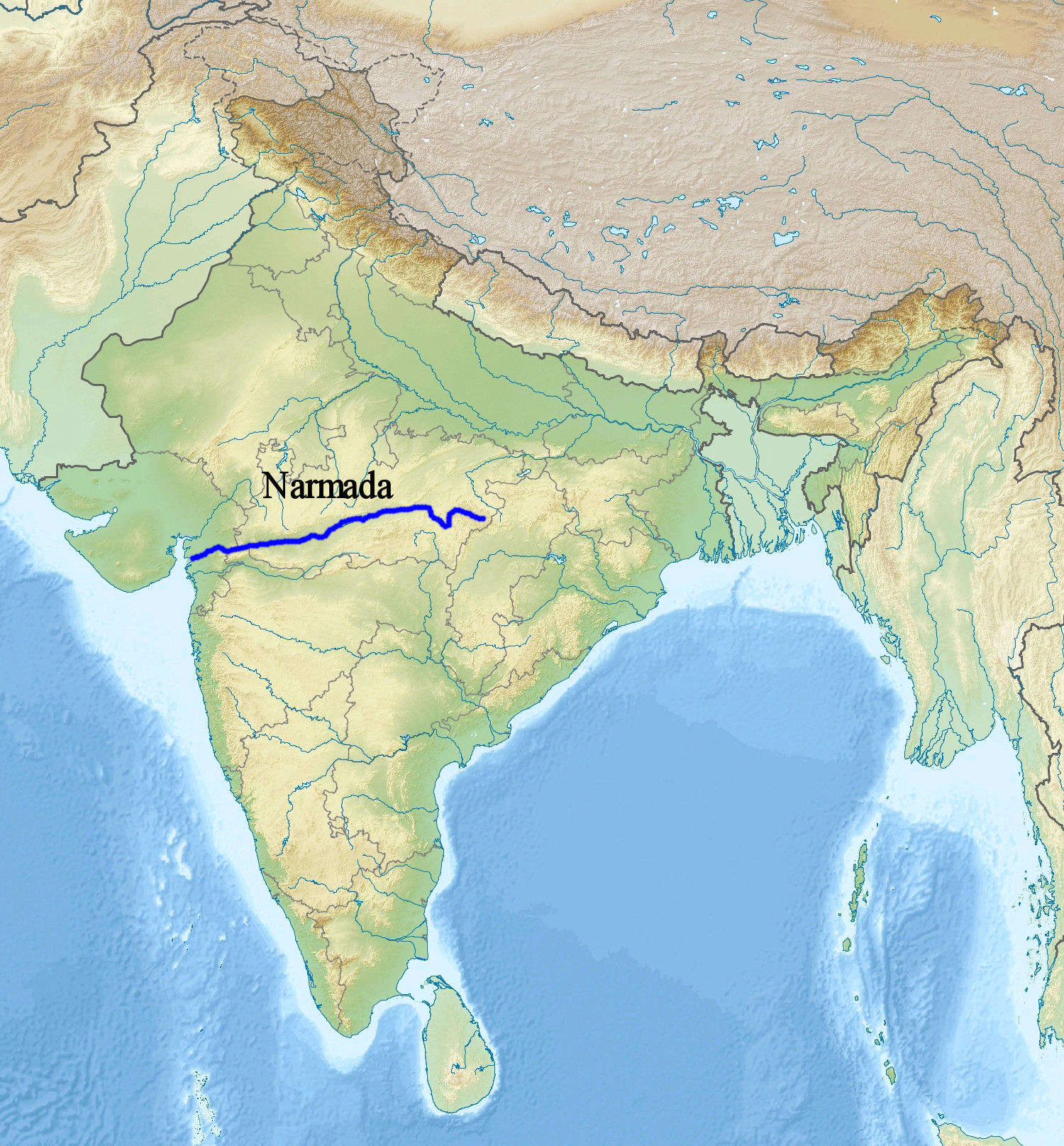
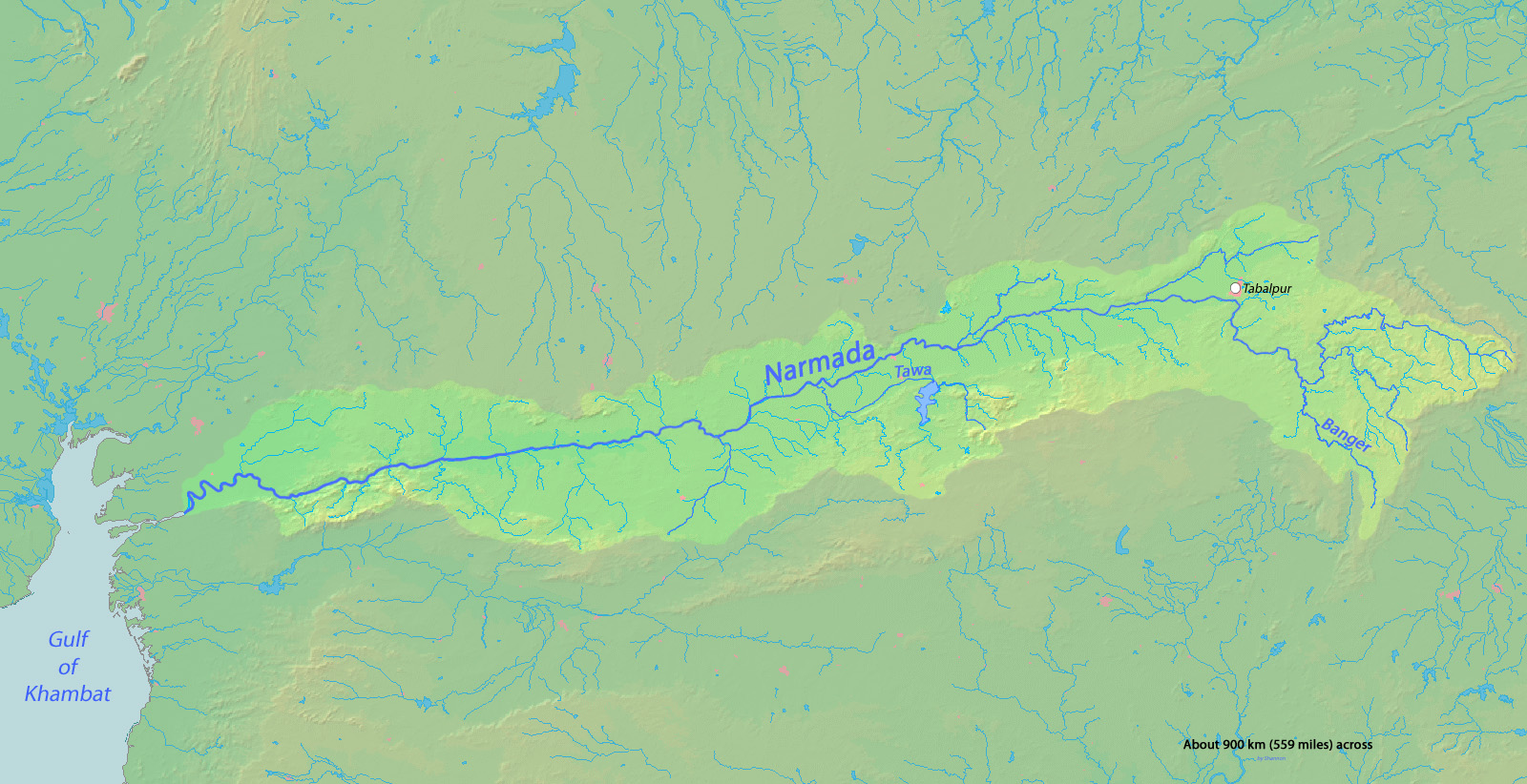
- Maps showing the course of the Narmada, selected tributaries, and the approximate extent of its drainage area

Location
- Country: India
- State: Madhya Pradesh, Maharashtra, Gujarat
- City: Jabalpur, Narmadapuram, Budhni, Dindori, Narsinghpur Harda, Mandhata, Omkareshwar, Barwaha, Mandleshwar, Maheshwar, Barwani, Mandla, Bharuch, Rajpipla, Sinor (Vadodara District), Dabhoi (Vadodara District), Karjan (Vadodara District), Dharampuri

Physical characteristics
- Source: Narmada Kund
  - location: Amarkantak Plateau, Anuppur district, Central India, Madhya Pradesh
  - coordinates: 22°40′0″N 81°45′0″E
  - elevation: 1,048 m (3,438 ft)
- Mouth: Gulf of Khambhat (Arabian Sea)
  - location: Bharuch District, Gujarat
  - coordinates: 21°39′4″N 72°48′43″E
  - elevation: 0 m (0 ft)
- Length: 1,312 km (815 mi)approx.
- Discharge
  - average: 1,447 m^{3}/s (51,100 cu ft/s)
- Discharge
  - location: Garudeshwar
  - average: 1,216 m^{3}/s (42,900 cu ft/s)
  - minimum: 10 m^{3}/s (350 cu ft/s)
  - maximum: 11,246 m^{3}/s (397,100 cu ft/s)

Basin features
- Tributaries
  - left: Kharmer, Burhner, Banjar, Temur, Sanair (Saner), Sher, Shakkar, Dudhi, Sukhri, Tawa, Hather, Ganjal, Ajnal, Machak, Chhota Tawa, Kaveri (MP), Khurkia, Kunda, Borad, Deb, Goi, Karjan
  - right: Silgi, Balai, Gaur, Hiran, Biranjo, Tendoni, Barna, Kolar (MP), Sip, Jamner, Chandrakeshar, Khari, Kenar, Choral, Karam, Man, Uri, Hathni, Orsang

The Narmada River (IPA: [nəɾməd̪aː]), also known as the Narbada or anglicised as Nerbudda, is the fifth longest river in India and overall the longest west-flowing river in the country. It is also the largest river in the state of Madhya Pradesh. This river flows through the states of Madhya Pradesh and Gujarat and is known as their lifeline due to its contribution to the two states in many ways. The Narmada River originates from the Amarkantak Plateau in the Anuppur district. It forms a traditional boundary between North and South India and flows westwards for approximately 1,312 km (815.2 mi) before draining through the Gulf of Khambhat into the Arabian Sea, 30 km (18.6 mi) west of Bharuch city of Gujarat.

Along with the Tapti, it is one of only two major rivers in peninsular India that runs from east to west, and the peninsula's longest west flowing river. It is one of a few rivers in India that flows in a rift valley, bordered by the Satpura and Vindhya ranges. As a rift valley river, the Narmada does not form a delta: rift valley rivers form estuaries. Other rivers which flow through the rift valley include the Damodar River in Chota Nagpur Plateau and the Tapti. The Tapti and Mahi also flow through rift valleys, but between different ranges. The Narmada flows through the states of Madhya Pradesh (1,077 kilometres or 669 miles), and Maharashtra, (74 kilometres or 46 miles along the border between Maharashtra and Gujarat plus 39 kilometres or 24 miles along the border between Madhya Pradesh and Maharashtra) and in Gujarat (161 kilometres or 100 miles).

The Periplus Maris Erythraei (c. 80 AD) called the river the Namnadius (Ναμνάδιος), Ptolemy called it Namadus (Νάμαδος) and Namades (Ναμάδης) and the British Raj called it the Nerbudda or Narbada. Narmada is a Sanskrit word meaning "The Giver of Pleasure".

== Course ==
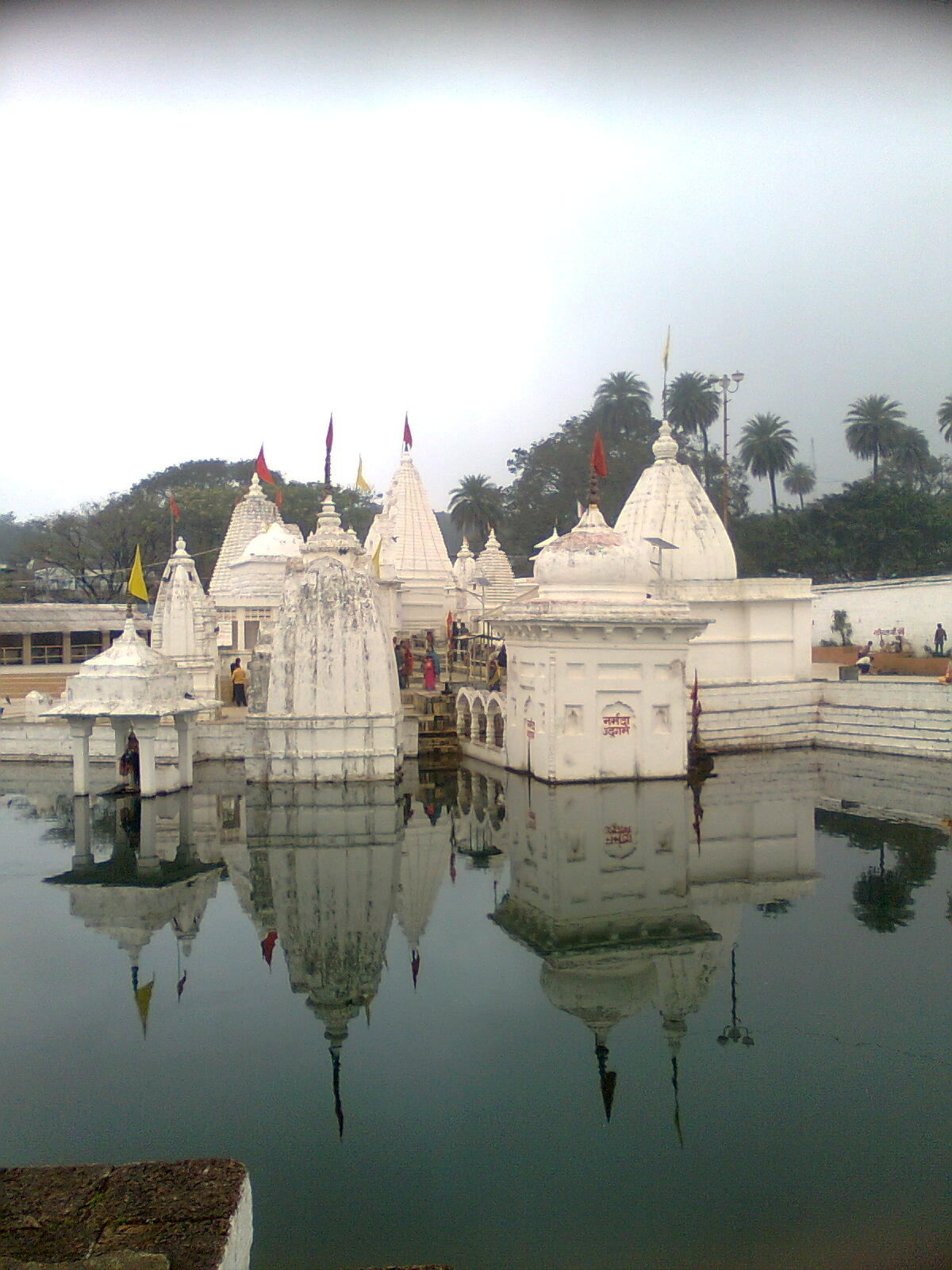
Narmada Kund, Narmada's origin at Amarkantak

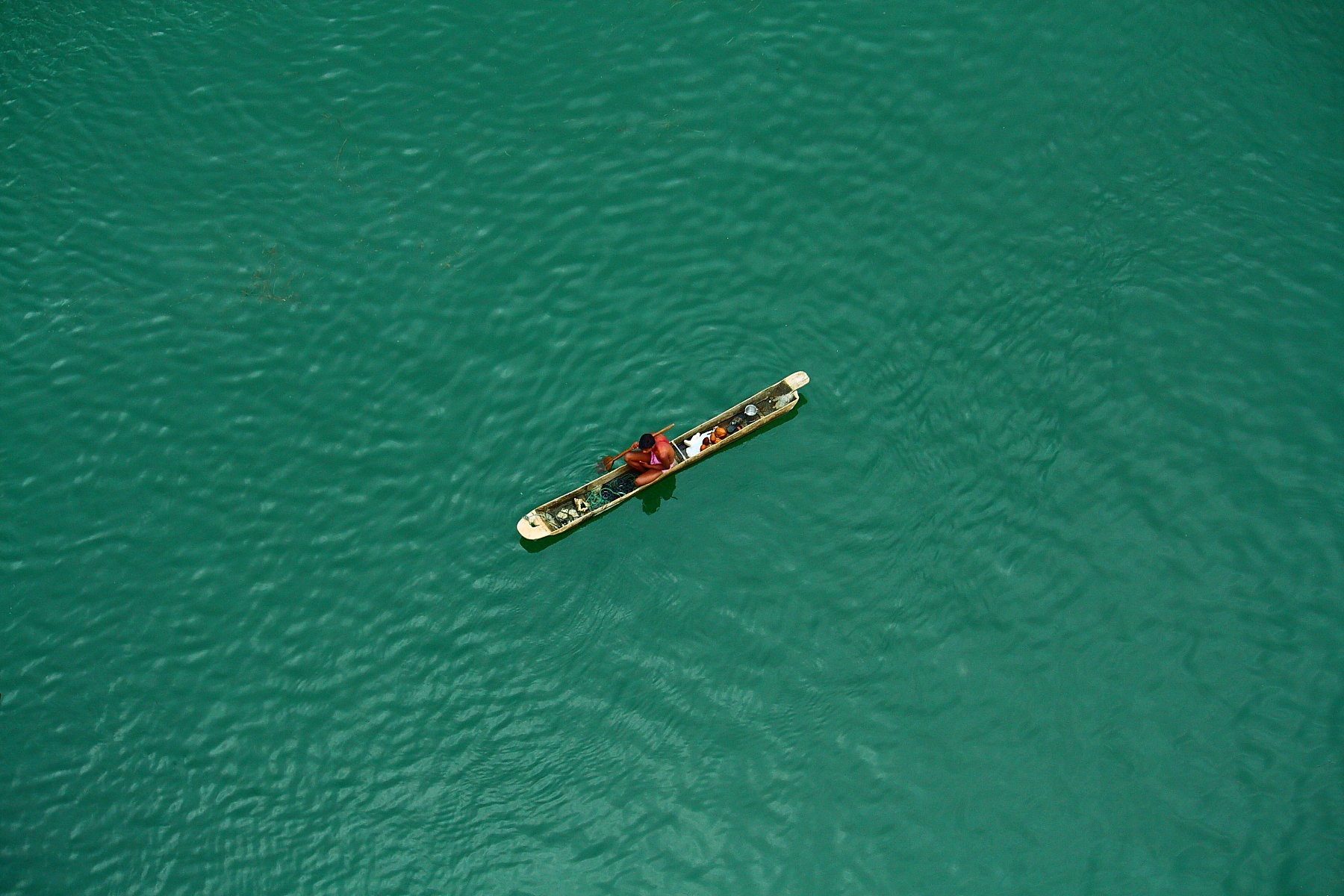
Narmada River at Tilwara Ghat, Jabalpur

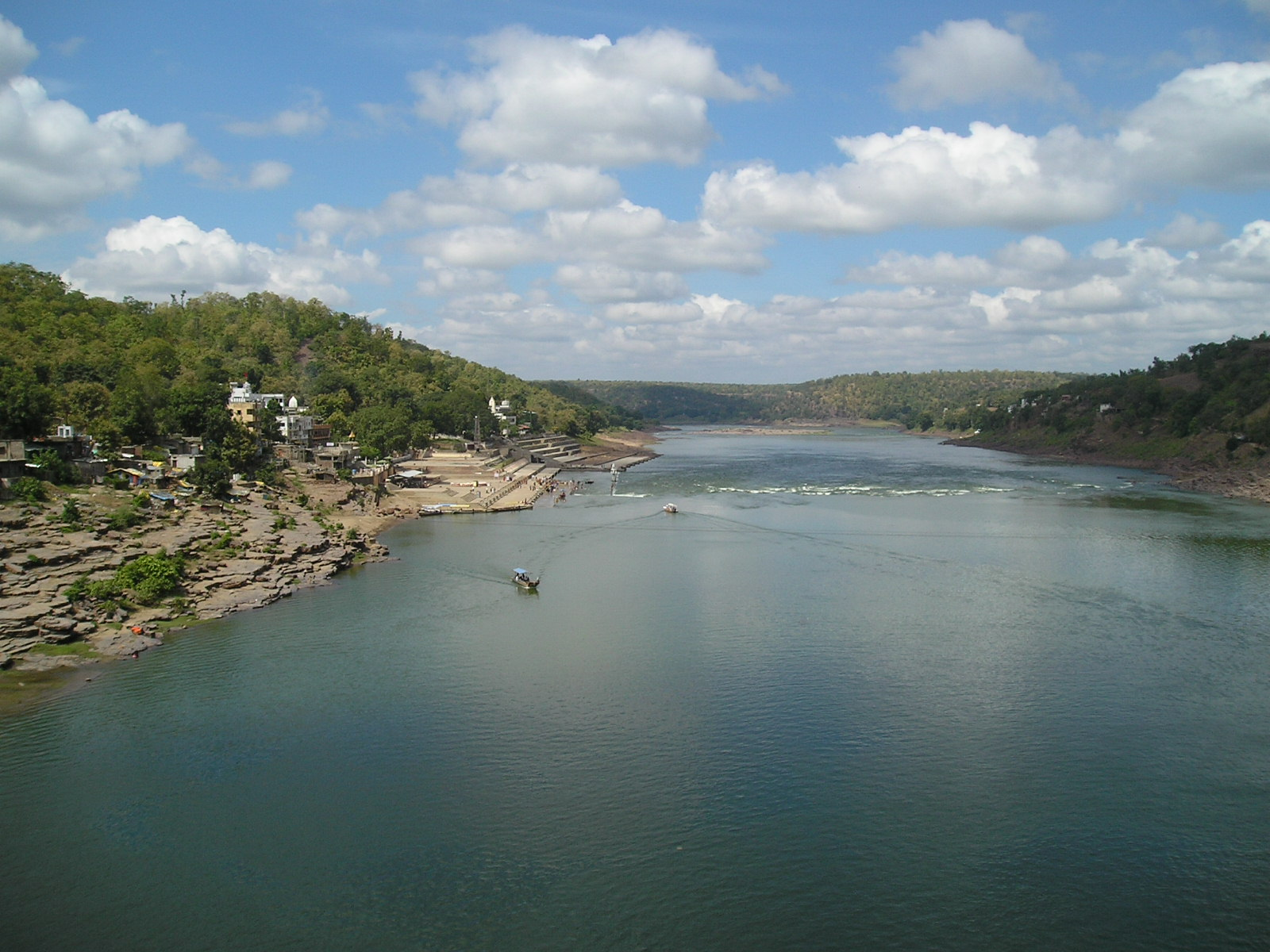
Narmada River in Omkareshwar

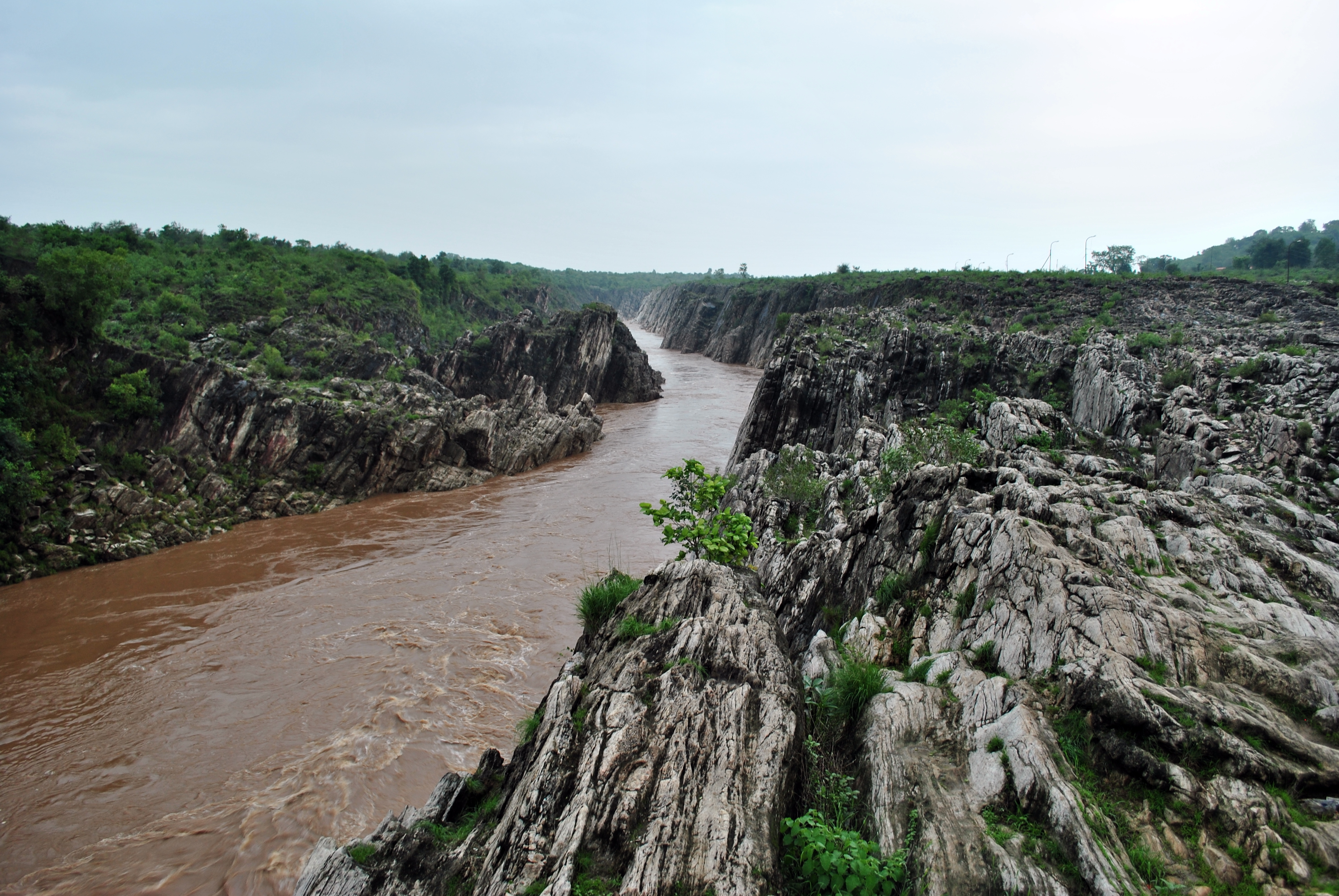
Narmada River flowing through a gorge of Marble Rocks in Bhedaghat

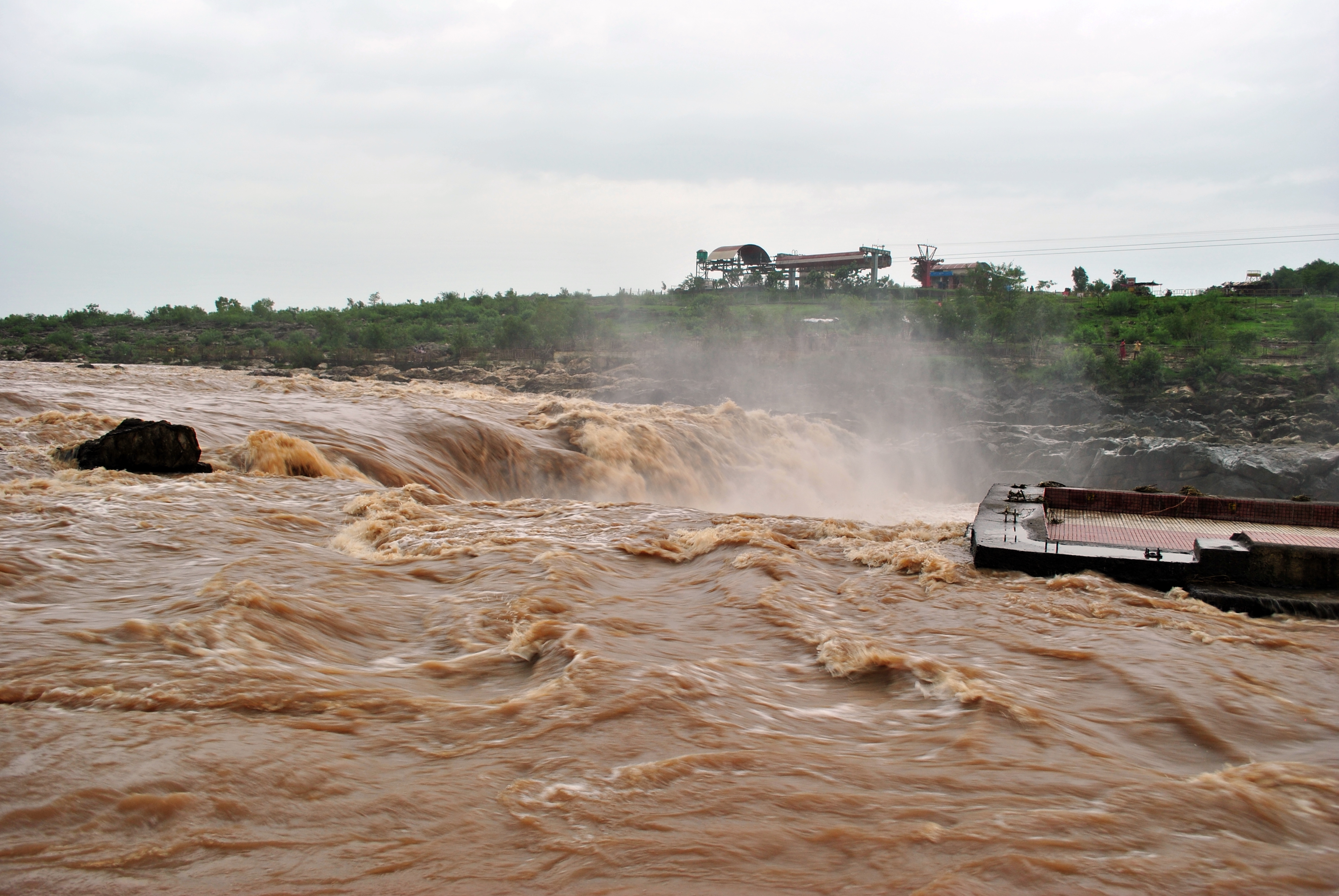
Side view of the Dhuandhar Falls seen during the monsoon season

The source of the Narmada is a small reservoir, known as the Narmada Kund. It is located at Amarkantak on the Amarkantak Plateau in the Anuppur District, on Shahdol zone of eastern Madhya Pradesh. The river descends from Sonmuda, then falls over a cliff as the Kapildhara waterfall, and meanders, in the hills, flowing through a tortuous course crossing the rocks and islands, up to the ruined palace of Ramnagar. Between Ramnagar and Mandla, 25 km (15.5 mi) further southeast, the course is comparatively straight, with deep water devoid of rocky obstacles. The Banger joins from the left. The river then runs north–west in a narrow loop towards Jabalpur. Close to this city, after a fall of some 9 m (29.5 ft), called the Dhuandhara (the fall of mist), it flows for 3 km (1.9 mi), in a deep, narrow channel through the magnesium limestone and basalt rocks, called the Marble Rocks; from a width of about 90 m (295.3 ft), above, it is compressed in this channel of (18 m (59.1 ft)), only. Beyond this point to its meeting with the Arabian Sea, the Narmada enters three narrow valleys between the Vindhya scarps in the north and the Satpura range in the south. The southern extension of the valley is wider at most places. These three valley sections are separated by the closely approaching line of the scarps and the Satpura hills.

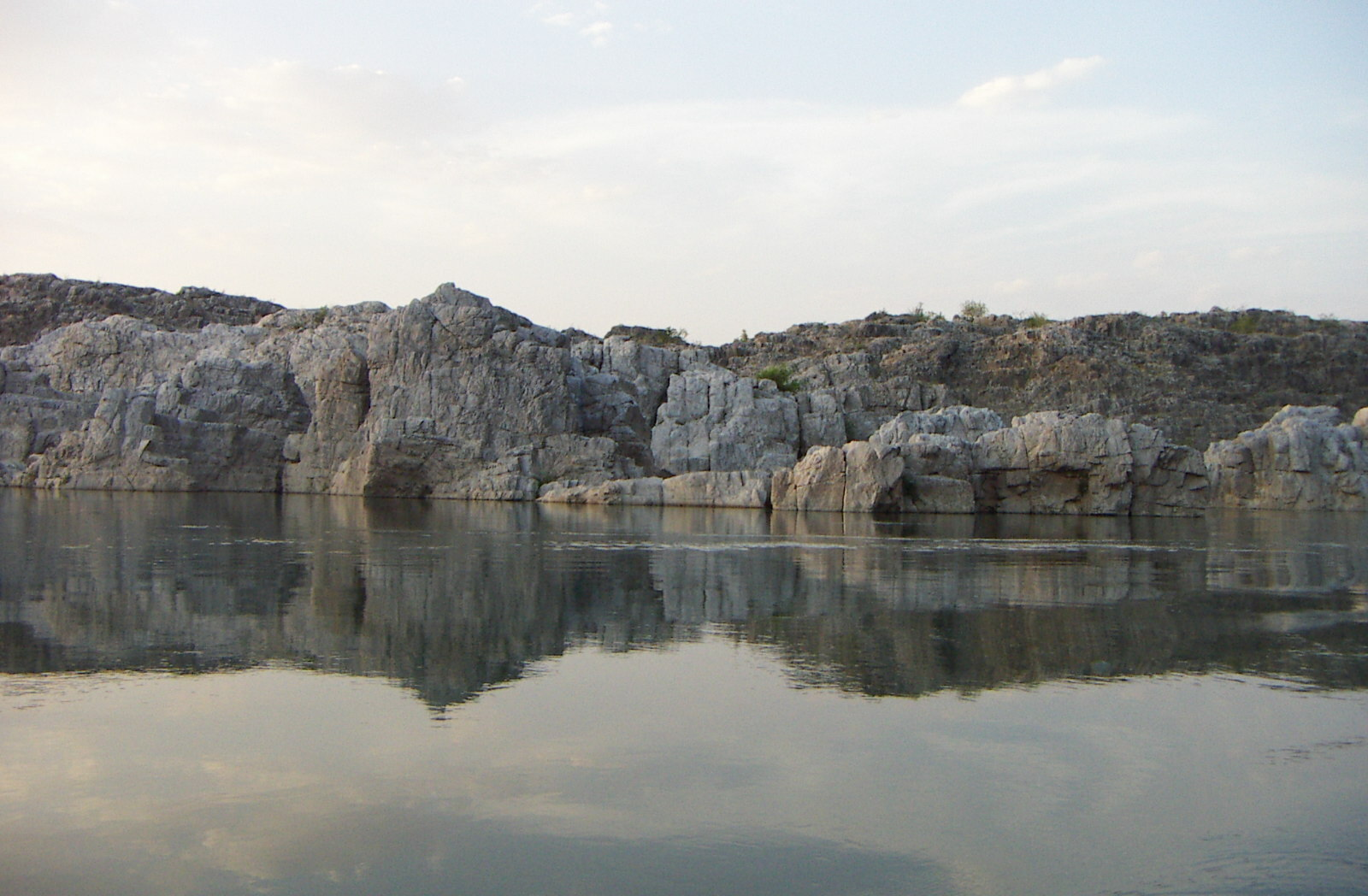
Marble Rocks alongside Narmada River

Emerging from the Marble Rocks the river enters its first fertile basin, which extends about 320 km (198.8 mi), with an average width of 35 km (21.7 mi), in the south. In the north, the valley is limited to the Barna–Bareli plain terminating at Barkhara Hills opposite Narmadapuram. However, the hills again recede in the Kannod plains. The banks are about (12 m (39.4 ft)) high. It is in the first valley of the Narmada that many of its important tributaries from the south join it and bring the waters of the northern slopes of the Satpura Hills. Among them are: the Sher River, Shakkar River, the Dudhi River, the Tawa (biggest tributary) and the Ganjal. The Hiran, the Barna, the Choral, the Karam and the Lohar are the important tributaries joining from the north.

Below Handia and Nemawar to Hiran fall (the deer's leap), the river is approached by hills from both sides. In this stretch the character of the river is varied. Omkareshwar, sacred to Shiva is an important place of worship in Madhya Pradesh. At first, the descent is rapid and the stream, quickening in pace, rushes over a barrier of rocks. The Sikta and the Kaveri join it below the Khandwa plain. At two points, at Mandhar, about 40 km (24.9 mi) below Nemawar, and Dadrai, 40 km (24.9 mi) further down near Punasa, the river falls over a height of about 12 m (39.4 ft).

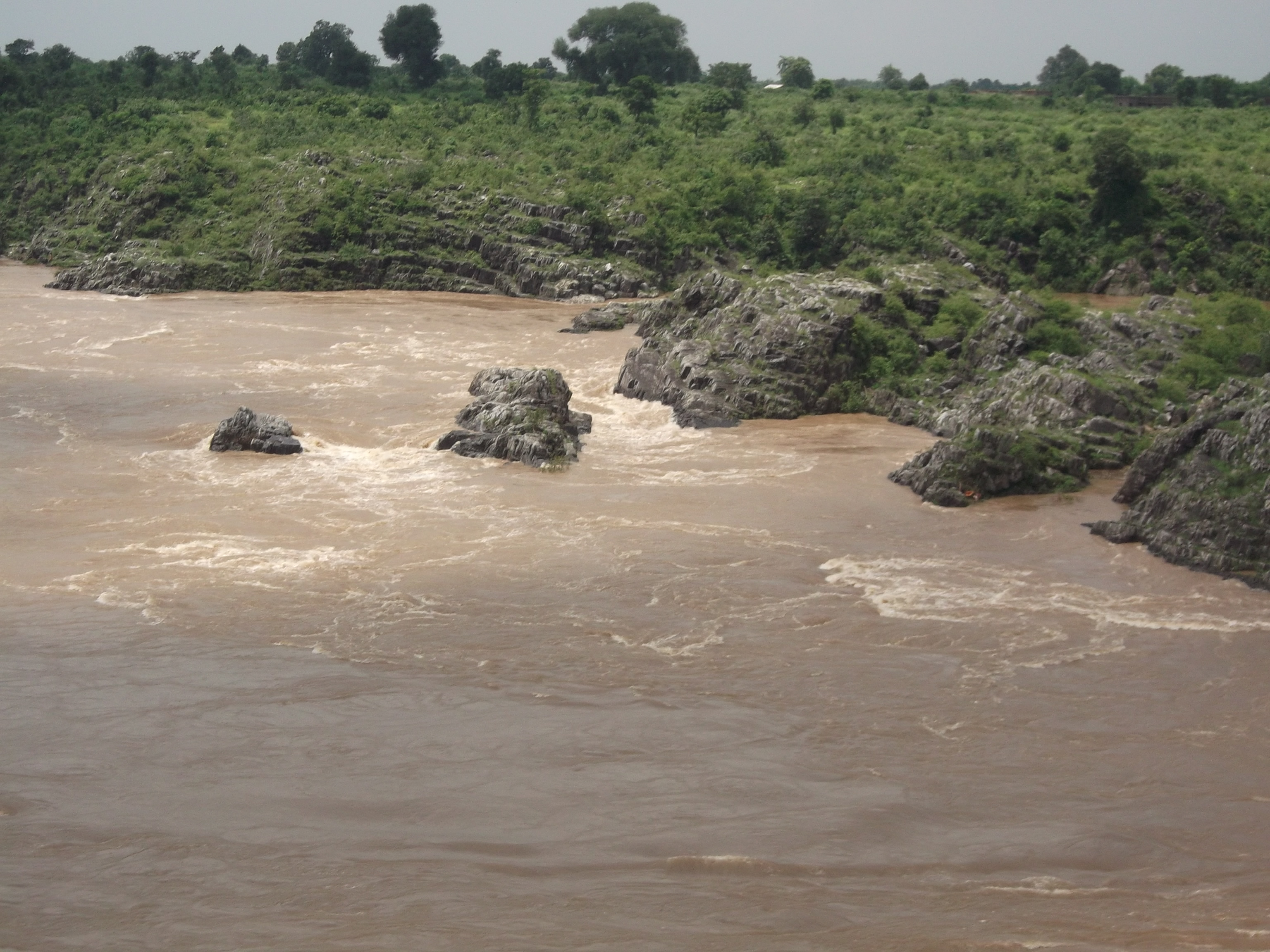
Narmada River at full flow during monsoon in Bhedaghat

A few kilometres further down in Barwaha the Narmada enters the Mandleshwar plain, the second basin about 180 km (111.8 mi) long and 65 km (40.4 mi) wide in the south. The northern strip of the basin is only 25 km (15.5 mi). The second valley section is broken only by Saheshwar Dhara fall. The early course of about 125 km (77.7 mi) up to Markari falls is met with a succession of cataracts and rapids from the elevated tableland of Malwa to the low level of the Gujarat plain. Towards the west of this basin, the hills draw very close but soon dwindle down.

Below Makrai, the river flows between Vadodara district and Narmada district and then meanders through the rich plain of Bharuch district of Gujarat state. The banks are high between the layers of old alluvial deposits, hardened mud, gravels of nodular limestone, and sand. The width of the river spans from about 1.5 km (0.9 mi) at Makrai to 3 km (1.9 mi) near Bharuch and to an estuary of 21 km (13.0 mi) at the Gulf of Cambay. An old channel of the river, 1 km (0.6 mi) to 2 km (1.2 mi) south from the present one, is very clear below Bharuch. The Karanjan and the Orsing are the most important tributaries in the original course. The former joins at Rundh and the latter at Vyas in Vadodara district of Gujarat, opposite each other and form a Triveni (confluence of three rivers) on the Narmada. The Amaravati and the Bhukhi are other tributaries of significance. Opposite the mouth of the Bhukhi is a large drift called Alia Bet or Kadaria Bet.

The tidal rise is felt up to 32 km (19.9 mi) above Bharuch, where the neap tides rise to about a metre and spring tide 3.5 m (11.5 ft). The river is navigable for vessels of 95 tonnes (i.e., 380 Bombay candies) up to Bharuch and for vessels up to 35 tonnes (140 Bombay candies) up to Shamlapitha or Ghangdia. The small vessels (10 tonnes) voyage up to Tilakawada in Gujarat. There are sand bases and shoals at the mouth and at Bharuch. The nearby island of Kabirvad, in the Narmada River, features a gigantic Banyan tree, which covers 10,000 square metres (2.5 acres).

== Narmada basin ==
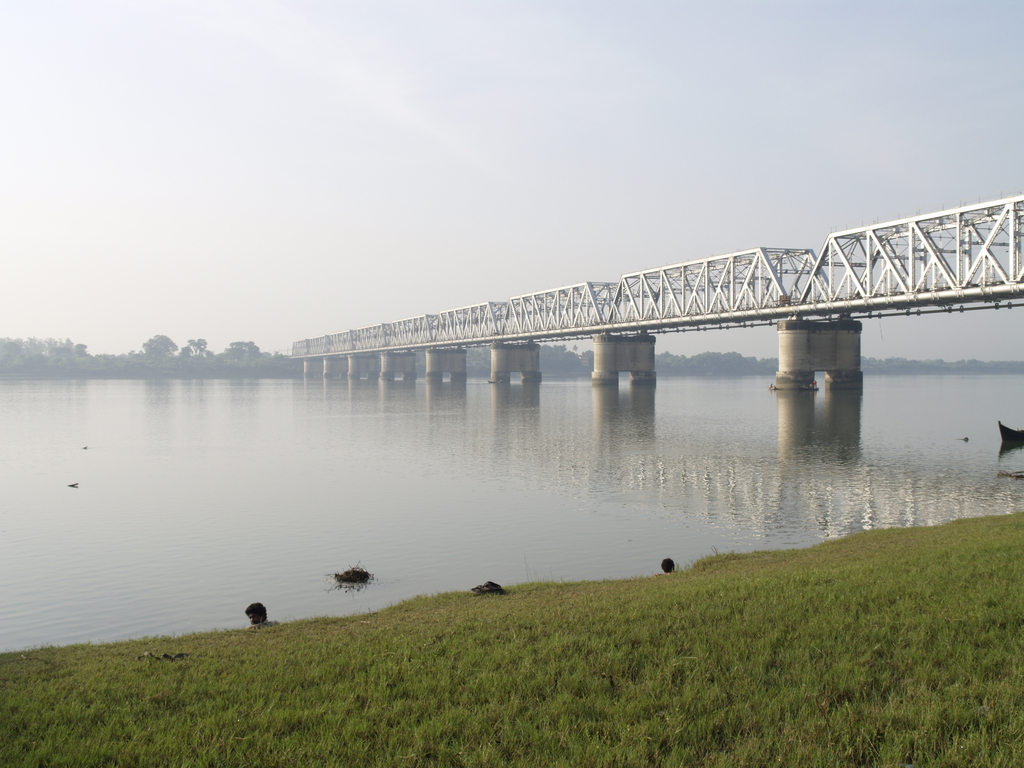
Railway Bridge on Narmada River at Bharuch, Gujarat

The Narmada basin, hemmed between Vindhya and Satpura ranges, extends over an area of 98,796 km^{2} (38,145.3 sq mi) and lies on the northern extremity of the Deccan Plateau. The basin covers large areas in the states of Madhya Pradesh (82%), Gujarat (12%), and a comparatively smaller area in Maharashtra (4%) and in Chhattisgarh (2%). 60% of the basin is arable land, 35% is forest cover, and 5% is made up of other types of land, such as grassland or wasteland. In the entire course of the river of 1,312 km (815.2 mi), there are 41 tributaries, out of which 22 are from the Satpura range and the rest on the right bank are from the Vindhya range. Dhupgarh (1,350 m), near Pachmarhi is the highest point of the Narmada basin.

The basin has five well-defined physiographic regions. They are:

1. The upper hilly areas covering parts of Anuppur, Mandla, Dindori, Balaghat and Seoni
2. The upper plains covering parts of Jabalpur, Narsinghpur, Chhindwara, Narmadapuram, Betul, Harda, Raisen and Sehore districts
3. The middle plains covering parts of Khandwa, Khargone, Dewas, Indore and Dhar
4. The lower hilly areas covering parts of Barwani, Alirajpur, Nandurbar, Chhota Udepur and Narmada
5. the lower plains covering mainly the districts of Narmada, Bharuch, and parts of Vadodara district.

The hill regions are well forested. The upper, middle, and lower plains are broad and fertile areas, well-suited for cultivation. The Narmada basin mainly consists of black soils. The coastal plains in Gujarat are composed of alluvial clays with a layer of black soils on the surface.

The valley experiences extremes of hydrometeorological and climatic conditions with the upper catchment having an annual precipitation in the range of 1,000 to 1,850 millimetres or 39 to 73 inches and with half or even less than half in its lower regions (650 to 750 millimetres or 26 to 30 inches); the diversity of vegetation from lush green in the upper region to dry deciduous teak forest vegetation in the lower region is testimony to this feature.

== Geology ==
About 160 million years ago, the supercontinent Pangea broke into two large masses. The northern part was Laurasia and the southern continental mass was Gondwana. Between the two continents, a large sea, Tethys existed. Presently, the Himalayas and the Tibetan Plateau have taken the position of the ancient Tethys Ocean. The Gondwana was intruded by few large marine transgressions. A deep gulf or sea existed along the Sindh-Baluchistan and Kutch. At one time, a marine ravine penetrated the very centre of Peninsular India through a narrow inlet along the present valley of Narmada. During this time, India was divided into two halves by narrow strips of marine transgressions, and there was no land communication between the Peninsular and northern India. Along the Narmada Valley, several patches of sediments have been deposited that contain ancient remains of animals. These fossils are similar to those found along the tracts of Tapi River. Such similarity probably suggests that even about 3 million years ago, Narmada and Tapi were confluent and the separate fate of these two rivers was decided by recent earth movements. The Bhedaghat falls of Narmada, near Jabalpur, was probably created during one such movement. The Narmada Valley is a graben, a layered block of the Earth's crust that dropped down relative to the blocks on either side due to ancient spreading of the Earth's crust. Two normal faults, known as the Narmada North fault and Narmada South fault, parallel to the river's course, and mark the boundary between the Narmada block and the Vindhya and Satpura blocks or Horsts, which rose relative to the Narmada Graben. The Narmada's watershed includes the northern slopes of the Satpuras, and the steep southern slope of the Vindhyas, but not the Vindhyan tableland, the streams from which flow into the Ganges and Yamuna.

== Significance in Hinduism ==
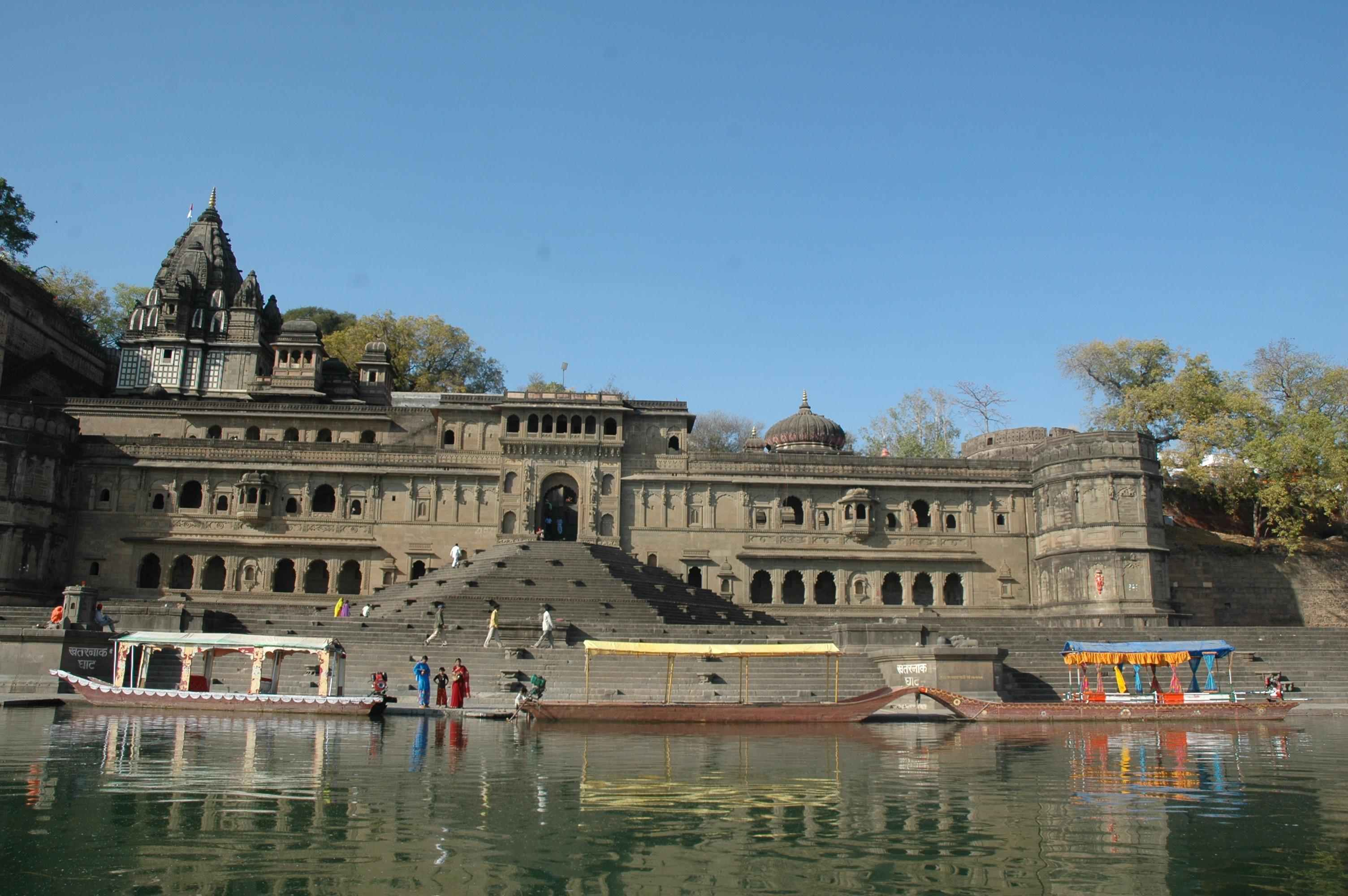
A scenic view of Maheshwar Temple on the banks of Narmada River

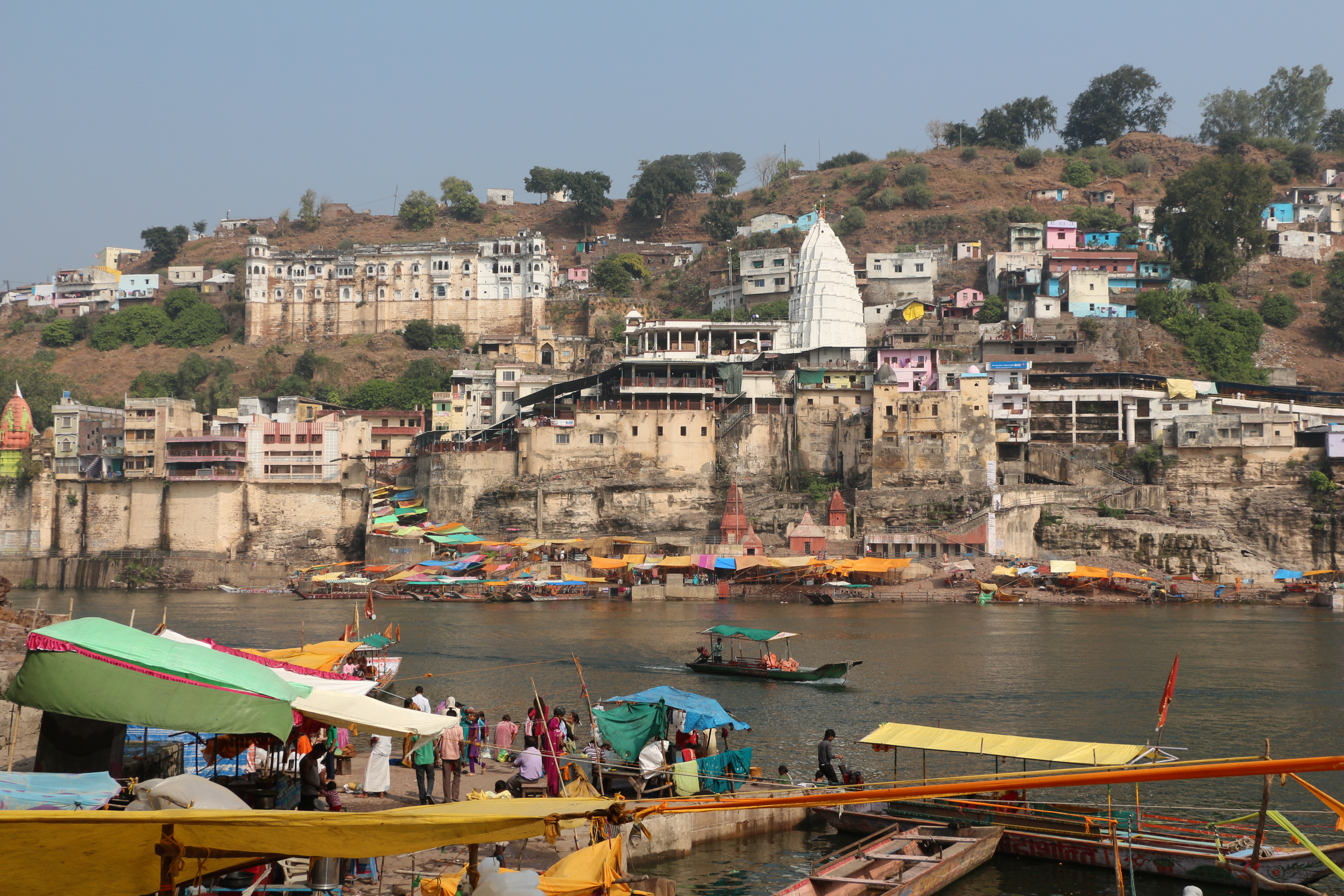
Omkareshwar Temple on the banks of Narmada River

=== Deity status ===
Like the Ganges, the Narmada River is a goddess and a river in Hinduism. The Matsya Purana states that all of the banks along the Narmada are sacred. Ptolemy called the Narmada River 'Nammadus' and the author of the Periplus called it 'Nammadios.'

There are many stories about the origin of the Narmada River. According to the Rewa Khand, the Narmada was created from Shiva's perspiration while he was performing penance on Mount Riksha. Due to this, the Narmada River is known as Shiva's daughter. In another legend, two teardrops fell from the eyes of Brahma, the creator of the universe, which yielded two rivers – the Narmada and the Son.

Narmada is also said to have been engaged with the Sonbhadra, another river flowing on the Chota Nagpur Plateau. According to the Puranas, the Narmada is also called the Reva, from its leaping motion (from the root 'rev') through its rocky bed.

The Narmada River is also worshipped as mother goddess Muktidayani, or liberating mother.

Adi Shankara met his guru Govinda Bhagavatpada in Omkareshwar, a town on the banks of the Narmada.

=== Source of sacred linga pebbles ===
Narmada is also considered sacred because of the pebbles known as banalinga that are found on the river bed. The pebbles are made up of white quartz and are linga-shaped. They are believed to be the personified form of Shiva and there is a popular saying, "Narmada Ke Kanker utte Sankar" which means that 'Shiva is in the pebbles of Narmada'.

=== Pilgrimage ===
Uttarvahini Panchkoshi Narmada Parikrama (literally "Northward-flowing 5- Narmada Circumbulation"), is a yearly month-long significant religious pilgrimage dedicated to the Narmada River. It spans a 14-kilometer path beside the Narmada River in Gujarat's Narmada region on a stretch of the river that is notable for its unusual northward flow, a direction considered exceptionally sacred in Hindu beliefs. Pilgrims traditionally traverse this route on foot, visiting important riverbanks known as ghats, including Shaherav Ghat, Rengan Ghat, Rampura Ghat, and Tilakwada Ghat. More than just a physical act of walking around the river, this parikrama offers an immersion into the cultural heritage of central India, providing insights into the local ways of life, customs, and religious observances. The Puranas state, "Ganga Snane, Yamuna Paane, Narmada darshane, Tatha Taapi Smarane" meaning "liberation is attained by bathing in the Ganges, drinking the water of the Yamuna, having darshan of the Narmada, and remembering the Tapi", i.e. "while bathing in the Ganges and drinking Yamuna's water are sacred, merely having darshan of the Narmada is believed to bestow liberation". Of the 150,000 rivers in the world, 400 are in India. Narmada is the only river in the world venerated through a sacredparikrama.

The importance of the Narmada River as sacred is testified by the fact that the pilgrims perform a holy pilgrimage of a parikrama or circumambulation of the river. The Narmada Parikrama, as it is called, is considered to be a meritorious act that a pilgrim can undertake.

The Uttarvahini Narmada Parikrama is a locally famous pilgrimage route that involves a 14-kilometer circumambulation along the Narmada River. This journey can commence at either the Rampura ghat or Tilakwada. Starting from Rampura ghat, pilgrims proceed along the riverbank towards Tilakwada, crossing a temporary bridge at Saherav before arriving at Rengan ghat. To complete the circle, they then cross the river by canoe. Alternatively, the parikrama can begin in Tilakwada, leading devotees through Rengan and Rampura, then via Saherav, ultimately returning to Tilakwada. Regardless of the starting point, the devotees traverse a seven-kilometer stretch on each side of the river, totaling the 14-kilometer sacred walk.

Many sadhus and pilgrims walk on foot from the Arabian Sea at Bharuch in Gujarat, along the river, to the source in Maikal Mountains (Amarkantak hills) in Madhya Pradesh and back along the opposite bank of the river. It is a 2,600-kilometre (1,600 mi) walk. The spiritual journey is usually taken for 3 years, 3 months and 13 days and the pilgrims are stipulated not to cross the river at any point of time. Important towns of interest in the valley are Jabalpur, Barwaha, Narmadapuram, Harda, Narmada Nagar, Omkareshwar, Dewas (Nemavar, Kity, Pipri), Mandla and Maheshwar in Madhya Pradesh, and Rajpipla and Bharuch in Gujarat. Some places of historical interest are Chausath Yogini Temple, Joga Ka Quilla, Chhatri of Baji Rao Peshwa and Bhimbetka, and among the falls are the Dhuandhar Falls, Dugdhdhara, Dhardi falls, Kapiladhara and Sahastradhara.

The pilgrimage, which is held in Hindu month of Chaitra (Late March to April), at least 100,000 daily pilgrims for a month, or at least 3 million pilgrims over the duration of the event making it one of the largest peaceful gatherings in the world.

== Ecology ==
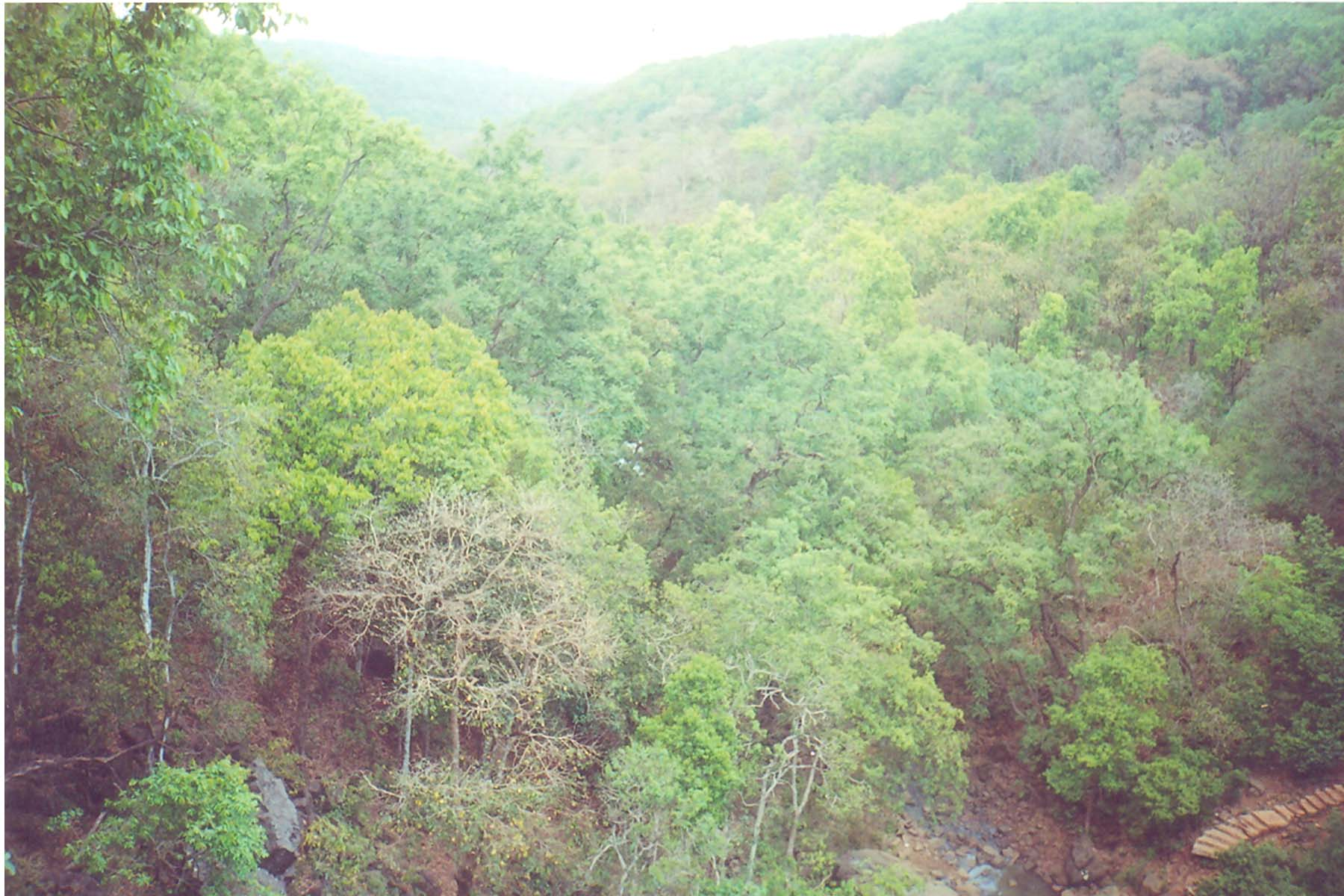
Forests of Amarkantak

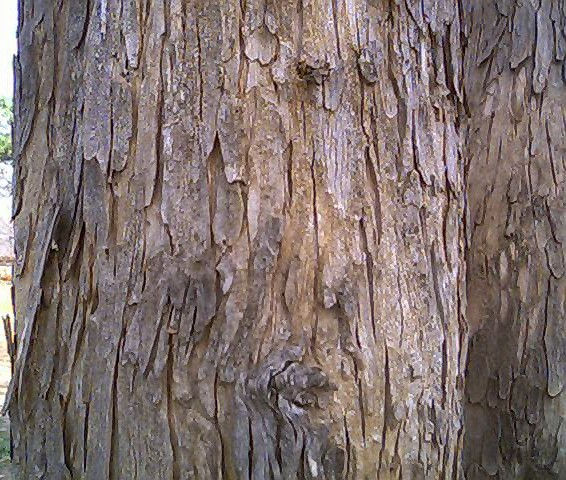
Bark of Lagerstroemia parviflora

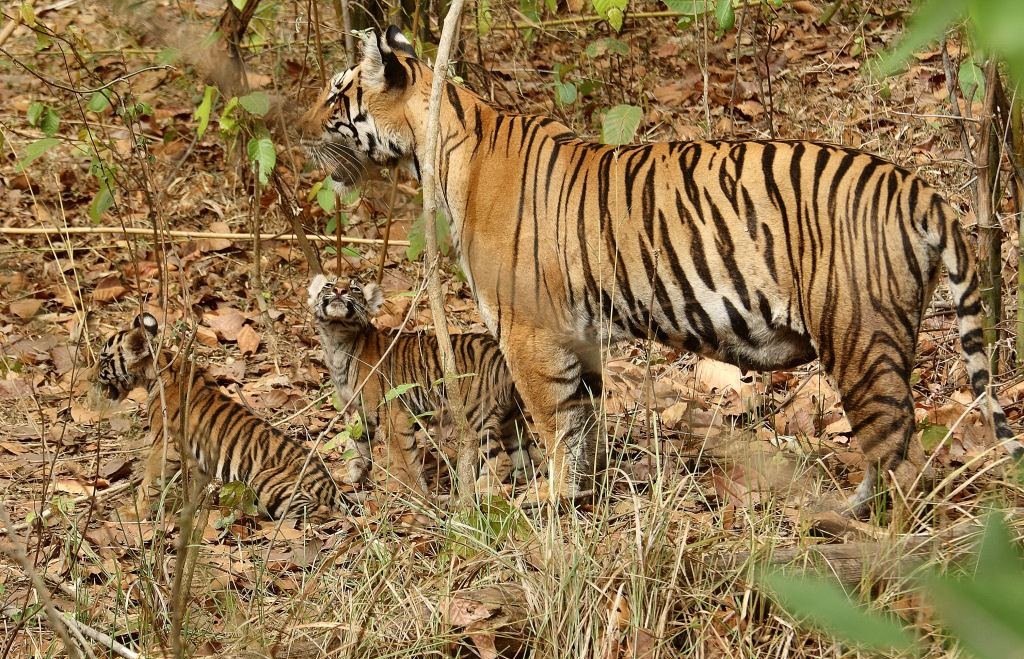
Tigress with her two cubs in Kanha National Park

The lower Narmada River Valley and the surrounding uplands, covering approximately 170,260 km² (65,738 sq mi), consist of dry deciduous forests. The ecoregion lies between moister forests to the northeast, southeast, and southwest, which receive greater rainfall from the southeast monsoon, and the drier forests and scrublands of the Deccan to the south and Malwa and Gujarat to the west and northwest. The natural vegetation of the region is a three-tiered forest.

Tectona grandis is the dominant canopy tree, in association with Diospyros melanoxylon, Dhaora (Anogeissus latifolia), Lagerstroemia parviflora, Terminalia tomentosa, Lannea coromandelica, Hardwickia binata and Boswellia serrata. Riparian areas along the regions' rivers and streams, which receive yearg– round water, are home to moist evergreen forests, whose dominant tree species are Terminalia arjuna, Syzygium cumini (Jambul), Syzygium Heyneanum, Salix tetrasperma, Homonoia riparia, and Vitex negundo.

The ecoregion is home to 76 species of mammals and to 276 bird species, none of which are endemic. About 30% of the ecoregion is covered in relatively intact vegetation. The ecoregion includes some large blocks of habitat in the Vindhya and Satpura ranges. About 5% of the ecoregion lies within protected areas, including Bandhavgarh, Panna, and Sanjay National Parks.

Some of the important national parks and wild life sanctuaries in the valley are the following: Kanha National Park located in the upper reaches of Narmada, about 18 km (11.2 mi) from Mandla, boasts of several wild animals including the Tiger. Two tributaries of Narmada, namely, Sulkum and Banjar, flow through this park. It is one of the best National Parks of Asia, which has been described vividly by Rudyard Kipling in his famous creation The Jungle Book.

Satpura National Park, set up in 1981, is located in Narmadapuram district of Madhya Pradesh. Its name is derived from Satpura hill ranges (Mahadeo hills) and covers an area of 524 km^{2} (202.3 sq mi) and along with the adjoining Bori and Panchmarhi Sanctuaries, provides 1,427 km^{2} (551.0 sq mi) of unique central Indian Highland ecosystem. Satpura National Park, being part of a unique ecosystem, is very rich in biodiversity. The fauna consists of tiger, leopard, sambar, chital, bhedki, nilgai, four-horned antelope, chinkara, gaur, wild boar, wild dog, sloth bear, black buck, fox, porcupine, flying squirrel, mouse deer, Indian giant squirrel. There are a variety of birds. Hornbill and peafowl are the common birds. The flora of the national park consists of mainly sal, teak, tendu, aonla, mahua, bael, bamboo, and a variety of grasses and medicinal plants.

Forest areas outside protected areas are also quite rich in floral and faunal diversity.

Mandla Plant Fossils National Park, Dindori National fossils park Ghughuya is situated in Dindori district of Madhya Pradesh in India. This national park has plants in fossil form that existed in India anywhere between 40 million and 150 million years ago spread over seven villages of Mandla District (Ghuguwa, Umaria, Deorakhurd, Barbaspur, Chanti-hills, Chargaon and Deori Kohani). The Mandla Plant Fossils National Park is an area that spreads over 274,100 m^{2} (2,950,387.8 ft^{2}). Such fossils are found in three other villages of the district also, but they lie outside the national park.

The Pachmarhi Biosphere Reserve covers part of three civil districts viz., Narmadapuram, Betul and Chhindwara of Madhya Pradesh. The total area is 4,926.28 km^{2} (1,902.0 sq mi). It envelops three wildlife conservation units viz., Bori Sanctuary (518.00 km^{2}), Satpura National Park (524.37 km^{2} (202.5 sq mi)), and Pachmarhi Sanctuary (461.37 km^{2} (178.1 sq mi)). Satpura National Park forms the core zone, while the remaining area of 4,501.91 km^{2} (1,738.2 sq mi)) surrounding the core zone serves as buffer zone. The area comprises 511 villages. The area exhibits variety of geological rock and soil formations. There is a wide spectrum of floral and faunal features that occupy the Satpura conservation area. It is one of the oldest forest reserves, which has an established tradition of scientific management of forests. It constitutes a large contiguous forest block that harbours a community of plant and animal species typical of the central highland region.

Apart from the above national parks, there are also some natural preserves such as the Amarkantak, the Bagh Caves and the Bhedaghat. In compliance of the Environmental Action Plan for the Narmadasagar and Omkareswar HEPs, as per the recommendations of the Wildlife Institute of India three new protected areas may be created, which are, a) the Narmada National Park (496.70 km^{2}), b) the Surmanya Sanctuary (126.67 km^{2}) and c) Omkareshwar Sanctuary (119.96 km^{2}) comprising a total area of 788.57 km^{2} (304.47 sq mi).

Shoolpaneshwar Sanctuary in Gujarat, near the Sardar Sarovar dam site, previously called the Dumkal Sloth Bear Sanctuary (the old sanctuary has been expanded four times) now covers an area of about 607 km^{2} (234.4 sq mi), a major watershed feeding the Sardar Sarovar and Karjan reservoir (on the Karjan River, a tributary of Narmada in Gujarat). It is the habitat of mammals and a variety of birds, including eagles and hawks.

== Anthropological and archaeological sites ==
The development of the Narmada river has led to the inundation of some archaeological and architectural sites. The Department of Archaeology, Museums and Archives, Government of Madhya Pradesh, undertook rescue excavations in response, and transplanted a number of temples. An attempt to comprehensively list and publish lost sites has been undertaken by Jürgen Neuss. Many Dinosaur fossils have been found in the Narmada valley. The first dinosaur fossil in India was discovered in 1828 by William Sleeman at Jabalpur. In 1982 fossil remains of Rajasaurus narmadensis, which lived in the Cretaceous Period, was discovered.

The Narmada Human, an extinct hominin species was discovered near Hathnora village in Sehore district in 1982, and is one of the earliest hominin bones in South East Asia. Other evidence or early hominin activity, including tools, have been found along the valley

== River development ==
The Narmada river has a huge water resources potential, as much as 33,210,000 acre-feet (40.96 km^{3}) of average annual flow (more than 90% of this flow occurring during the monsoon months of June – September), which according to estimates is greater than the combined annual flows of the Ravi, Beas and the Sutlej rivers, which feed the Indus basin. The 75% dependable flow is 28,000,000 acre-feet (35 km^{3}).

=== Sardar Sarovar Dam ===
As one of the 30 dams planned on river Narmada, the Sardar Sarovar Dam is the largest structure to be built. It is the second largest concrete dam in the world in terms of the volume of concrete used in its construction, after the Grand Coulee Dam across the Columbia River, US. It is a part of the Narmada Valley Project, a large hydraulic engineering project involving the construction of a series of large irrigation and hydroelectricity multi-purpose dams on the Narmada River. After a number of cases before the Supreme Court of India (1999, 2000, 2003), by 2014 the Narmada Control Authority had approved a series of changes in the final height and the associated displacement caused by the increased reservoir, from the original 80 m (260 ft) to a final 163 m (535 ft) from foundation.

==== Water dispute ====
Investigations for harnessing the Narmada waters began in 1945 to 1946 by A. N. Khosla who was the chairman of the Central Waterways, Irrigation and Navigation Commission (CWINC). In 1948 the Khosla Committee recommended that further investigations be carried out on four of the seven proposed sites. The four sites included Tawa, Bargi, Punasa and the Broach Barrage and Canal Project. In 1951 CWNIC was renamed Central Waterways & Power Commission (CWPC) and in 1957 a senior member of the CWPC selected further investigations to be completed at Navagam, a site that fell under the Broach Project. Navagam eventually became CWPC's preferred site because the geography allowed the dam's height to be raised higher. In 1960, the federal Government of India's Ministry of Irrigation and Power consultant team recommended that the Navagam Dam height be raised in one phase and that the drought prone areas in then Bombay State (modern day Saurashtra and Kutch regions) receive irrigation.

On 1 May 1960, Bombay state was separated into the states of Maharashtra and Gujarat. The Navagam Dam site and Broach Project fell under the newly formed State of Gujarat and further development and planning was given to the Gujarat State government. The Gujarat State government began planning studies for harnessing Narmada's water past the Punasa site in Madhya Pradesh. At the same time, the Government of Madhya Pradesh was also finalising a separate report for the Punasa Project. The competing plans led to inter-State water conflicts to arise because the Narmada did not have enough water supply to meet the requirements as planned by the two states. This began inter-State conflicts that went on for several years until 1963 when the Chief Ministers of Madhya Pradesh and Gujarat arrived at a set of compromises called the Bhopal Agreement. Gujarat State ratified the agreement but Madhya Pradesh did not, which led to another impasse.

To break the logjam, a high-level Committee was appointed by the Government of India (GOI) in September 1964. In 1965, the Committee prepared a Master Plan for the basin, which involved construction of 12 major projects in Madhya Pradesh and the Navagam Dam in Gujarat. Gujarat endorsed the proposal, but Maharashtra did not. After intense parleys failed to resolve the problem, in 1968 GOI agreed to establish the Narmada Water Disputes Tribunal (NWDT) under the Interstate River Water Disputes Act of 1956 to adjudicate on the dispute relating to sharing of water of the interstate Narmada and its valley.

After ten years of deliberations and taking into consideration the development of the water resources of the basin as a whole, the NWDT gave its verdict after assessing all the reports.

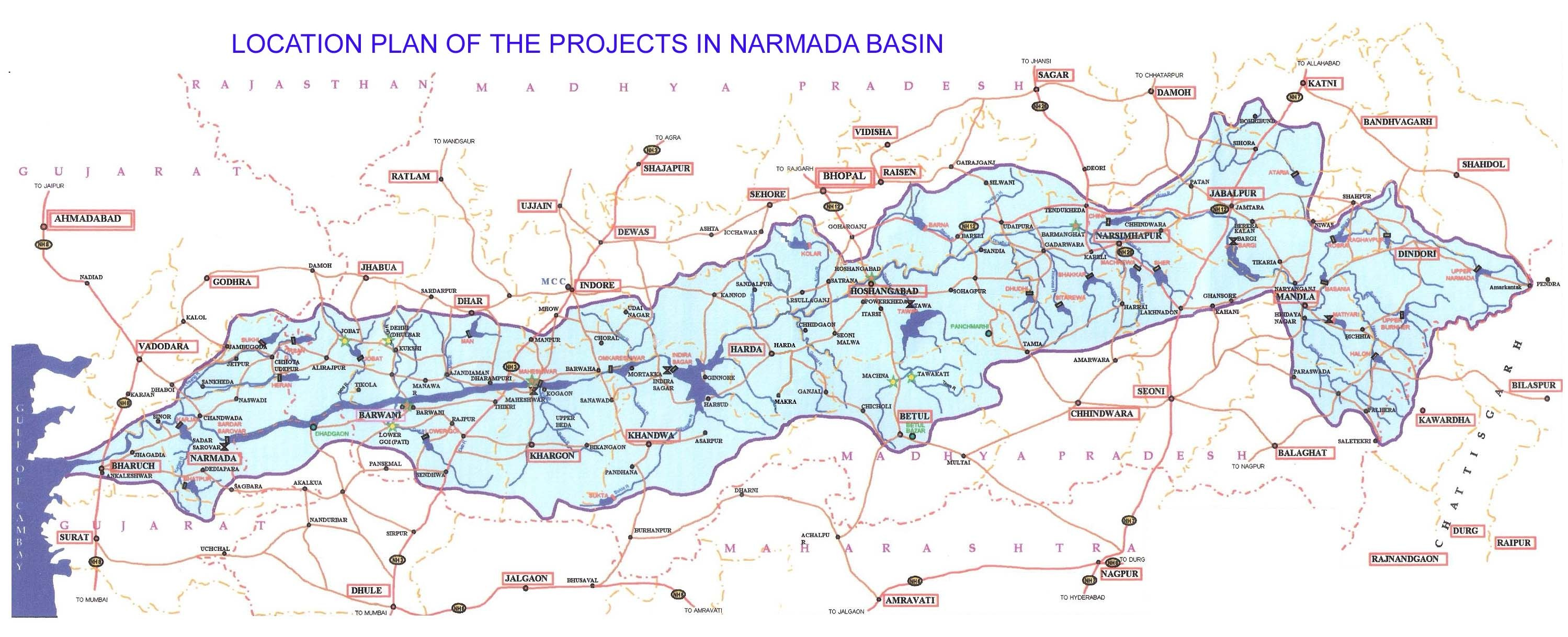
Layout of Water Resources Development Projects in the Narmada Basin in Gujarat and Madhya Pradesh

Even though the tribunal award resolved the initial issue of water sharing, the height of dam, benefit sharing and the mode of settlement of affected people caused serious difficulties in implementation, particularly of the Sardar Sarovar dam.

The social movement Narmada Bachao Andolan (NBA) was formed to address environmental concerns and rehabilitation and resettlement of affected people. The movement created worldwide attention to the major development activity planned in the valley. This resulted in the Bank conducting an Independent Review Mission (IRM) in 1991 of the Sardar Sarovar Project and identified several recommendations. However, the IRM's report was neither accepted by the Government of India or the World Bank. Finally the Government of India decided to terminate further drawing from the World Bank loan and would complete the project with national resources.

The Supreme Court has also deliberated on this issue for several years but finally upheld the Tribunal Award and allowed the construction to proceed, subject to conditions. The Court introduced a mechanism to monitor the progress of resettlement pari passu with the raising of the height of the dam through Grievance Redressal Authorities (GRA) in each of the party states. The court's decision referred in this document, given in the year 2000, after 7 years of deliberations, has paved the way for completing the project to attain full envisaged benefits.

==== Narmada Canal ====
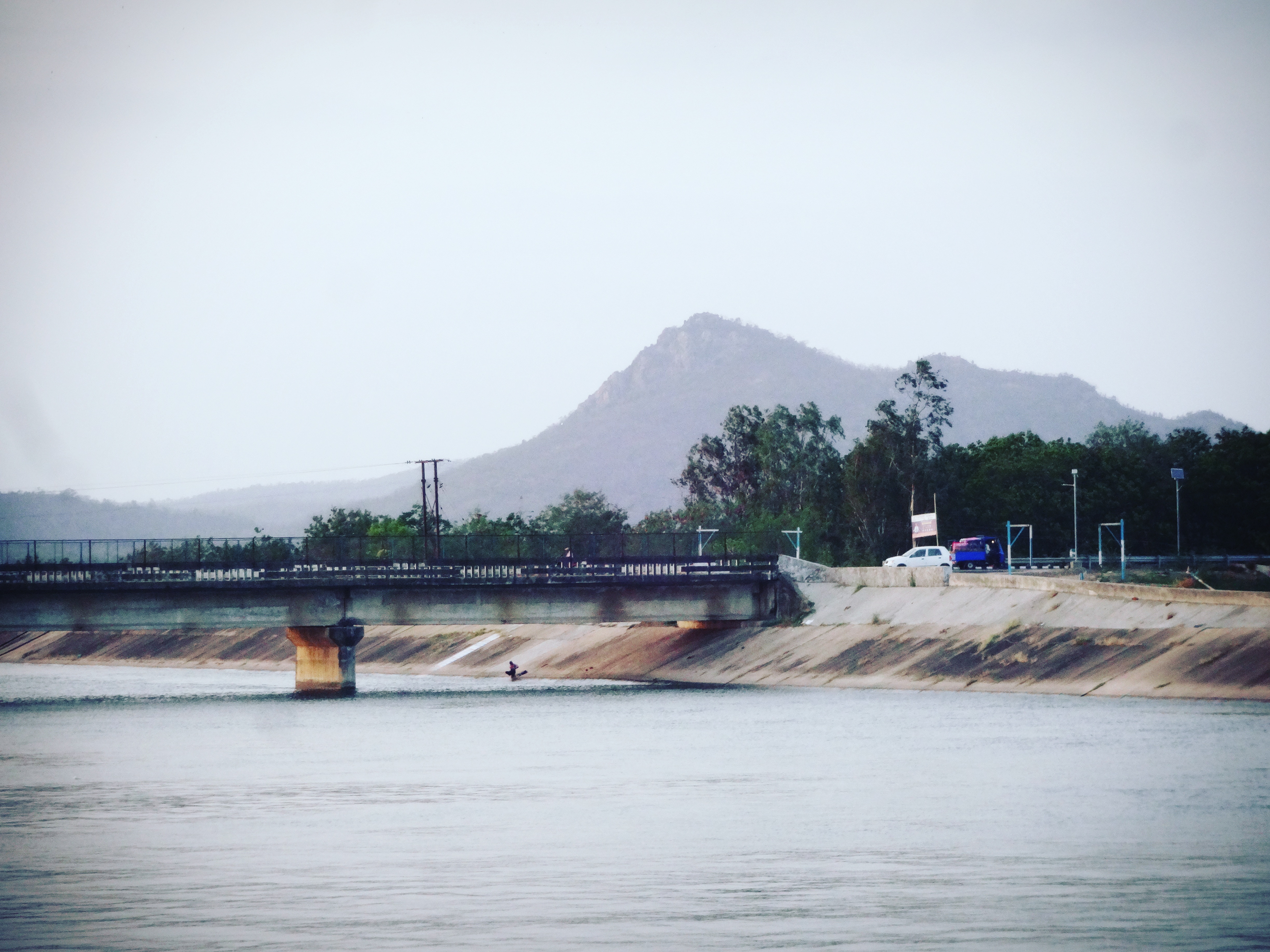
Waters flowing from Narmada Canal

The Narmada canal brings water from the Sardar Sarovar dam to the states of Gujarat and Rajasthan. The canal is 532 km long, with 485 km in Gujarat and 75 km in Rajasthan. The Narmada canal has helped both states supply water to arid regions of Kutch and Saurashtra for irrigation purposes. The Narmada canal had covered over 68 percent of the proposed villages (6,513) by 2010 in Gujarat.

=== Indirasagar Dam ===
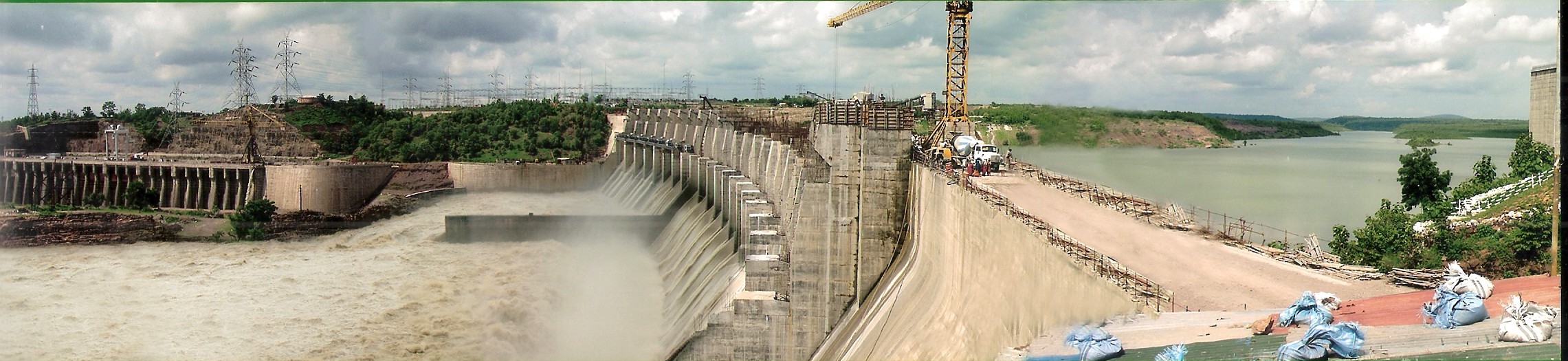
Indirasagar Dam on Narmada River

The Indira Sagar Project (ISP) at Punasa is one of the 30 major projects proposed in the Narmada basin with the largest storage capacity in the country. The project is located near Punasa village, in Khandwa District, Madhya Pradesh. This Multipurpose River Valley Project envisages construction of a concrete gravity dam, 653 metres (2,142 ft) long and 92 metres (302 ft) high with gross storage capacity of the reservoir of 12.22 km^{3} (9,910,000 acre⋅ft) and live storage of 9.75 km^{3} (7,900,000 acre⋅ft) to provide an annual irrigation potential of 1,690 km^{2} (650 sq mi) and a generation of 1000 MW of hydropower. The project also ensures supply of 60,000 acre⋅ft (74,000,000 m^{3}) of drinking water to rural areas in Khandwa district. In accordance with NWDT award, an annual regulated flow of 8,120,000 acre⋅ft (10.02 km^{3}) shall be released to the Sardar Sarovar Project (SSP), ex-Maheshwar Project. The operation of Indira Sagar Project will be carried out in such a way as to facilitate the regulation of Sardar Sarovar.

The dam and the powerhouse have been completed, but storage has been restricted up to EL 260 m under orders of the High Court, Jabalpur from R&R consideration. All the units of the powerhouse have been commissioned and generation of power from the eight units of 125 MW capacity, each commenced from January 2004. The irrigation component of the project is under a fairly advance stage of implementation.

== See also ==
- List of rivers of India
- Narmada Pushkaram – Indian festival
- 3rd Narmada Bridge – Bridge in Bharuch, India
- Bhadbhut barrage
- Sacred waters

== Bibliography ==
- Srivastava Pankaj (2007). Jungle Rahe taki Narmada Bahe. (Hindi). Narmada Conservation Initiative, Indore.
- Weir, Shelagh. The Gonds of central India: The Material Culture of the Gonds of Chhindwara District, Madhya Pradesh. London: British Museum, 1973
- Geoffrey Waring Maw (1991). Narmada, the life of a river. Marjorie Sykes.
- Yoginder K. Alagh; Mahesh T. Pathak; D. T. Buch (1995). Narmada and Environment: An Assessment. Har-Anand Publications.
- K. Sankaran Unni (1996). Ecology of River Narmada. APH Publishing. ISBN 978-81-7024-765-4.
- Singh Bal Hartosh (2013). Water close over us: A journey along the Narmada. HarperCollins India. ISBN 978-9350297056.
