= Patan, Madhya Pradesh =

Patan
- Town
- Location in Madhya Pradesh, India Patan (India)
- Coordinates: 22.53°N 79.42°E
- Country: India
- State: Madhya Pradesh
- District: Jabalpur

Government
  - Body: Nagarpalika patan
- Elevation: 652 m (2,139 ft)

Population (2001)
  - Total: 13,215

Languages
  - Official: Hindi
- Time zone: UTC+5:30 (IST)
- ISO 3166 code: IN-MP
- Vehicle registration: MP

Patan is a town and a nagar panchayat in Jabalpur district in the Indian state of Madhya Pradesh. Patan is 30 km from Jabalpur on State Highway 37A which connects Damoh to Jabalpur.

== Geography ==
Patan is located at 22.53°N 79.42°E. It has an average elevation of 652 metres (2139 feet).Katangi is another city 25 km away from Patan

== Demographics ==
As of 2001 India census, Patan had a population of 13,215. Males constitute 53% of the population and females 47%. Patan has an average literacy rate of 66%, higher than the national average of 59.5%: male literacy is 72%, and female literacy is 58%. In Patan, 14% of the population is under 6 years of age.

== Economy ==
Agriculture is core of Patan's economy. Area surrounding Patan is very fertile and Patan is hub for Grains-Trading. Patan has Krishi-Upaj Mandi as well as many Grain-Traders who purchase grains mainly wheat, pulses, grams, soybean from farmers and supply to major Grain-Markets of India.

== See also ==
- Katangi, Jabalpur
