= List of rivers of Madhya Pradesh =

Madhya Pradesh is a state in north-central India, is subtropical with substantial (1,400 mm (55.1 in)) monsoon rains that feed a large number of streams and rivers. The largest of these by volume is the Narmada, followed by the Tapti. Madhya Pradesh falls in five major river basins. The northern part of the state falls within the Ganges Basin where the Betwa, Chambal and Sone flow. South of the Ganges Basin is the Narmada Basin, the second largest in the state by surface area. The other three basins cover small portions of Madhya Pradesh, namely the Mahi Basin to the west, the Tapi Basin and the Godavari Basin to the south.

== Ganges Basin: Betwa ==
The Betwa drains off the Deccan plateau. Originating in the Kumra village in Raisen district of Madhya Pradesh, the Betwa flows for 590 km (232 km in MP and 358 km in UP). After meandering through Madhya Pradesh, it enters the neighbouring state, Uttar Pradesh, and joins the river Yamuna (Jamna) in Hamirpur. The Betwa takes along with it the waters of the eastern Malwa plateau. The tributaries of the Betwa include the Bina, Jamini, Dhasan . In ancient times, the Betwa was known as Vetrawati.

== Ganges Basin: Ken ==
- Ken River, which flows through the Bundelkhand region of Madhya Pradesh and Uttar Pradesh. It originates near Ahirgawan village in Jabalpur district and travels a distance of 427 kilometres (265 mi) before merging with the Yamuna at Chilla village, near Fatehpur in Uttar Pradesh. It has an overall drainage basin of 28,058 square kilometres (10,833 mi^{2}). Sunar and Urmil is major tributary of the Ken river.

- Sunar River is Major Tributary of ken river. It drains an approximately 12,000 square kilometre area of the southern boundary of Bundelkhand. Sunar River originates from Sagar District, Bewas, Kopra and Vyarma is major tributary of Sunar.

== Ganges Basin: Chambal ==
The Chambal originates from the Janapav Near Mhow Mountain in the Vindhya Range, and flows northeast through Ujjain, Ratlam and Mandsaur, before entering Rajasthan. It reenters Madhya Pradesh after meandering through parts of Rajasthan and touches Morena and Bhind. Here are the infamous Chambal Ravines that have been and still are the safest refuge for dacoits.

=== Shipra ===
The Shipra starts her journey in the Vindhya Range from a hill called Kokri Tekdi situated at a distance of 11 km from Dewas. This river is 195 km long, out of which 93 km flow through Ujjain. It then touches Ratlam and Mandsaur, before joining the river Chambal in Gwalior . The main tributaries of the Shipra are the Khan and the Gambhir.

== Ganges Basin: Sone ==
The Sone, also called the Maikalsut because its source is in the Maikal Hills, originates in Anuppur District in the Amarkantak highlands of the Maikal Range. Its chief tributaries are the Rihand and the North Koel. and also include the Kewai, Tipan, Kunak, Murna, Johilla, Mahanadi, and the Rer.

=== Kewai ===
The Kewai arises in the Maikal Hills and flows in Shahdol District and Anuppur District and then into the Son River.

=== Tipan ===
The Tipan River merges into the Son at the town of Anuppur. It is subject to illegal gravel mining.

=== Johilla ===
The Johilla (Juhila) arises near Jaleswar Dham near Amarkantak, in the Maikal Hills and is a tributary of the Son.

=== Chhoti Mahanadi ===
The Mahanadi tributary of the Son is distinct from the Mahanadi which originates in Chhattisgarh state and flows east. The political and mafia influence in western Madhya Pradesh's katni district's Ghunaur village has made this beautiful flowing perennial river worse than a drain. Once livelihood of the two villages namely Ghunaur and Barhata was inseparable of this river.

== Narmada Basin: Narmada ==
The Narmada basin, hemmed between Vindhya and Satpura ranges, extends over an area of 98,796 km^{2} (38,145.3 sq mi) and lies on the northern extremity of the Deccan Plateau. The basin covers large areas in the states of Madhya Pradesh (82%), Gujarat (12%) and a comparatively smaller area in Maharashtra (4%) and in Chhattisgarh (2%). 60% of the basin is made up of arable land, 35% is forest cover and 5% is made up of other types of land such as grassland or wasteland.

=== Tributaries ===
Many rivers like Tawa, Hiran, Shankar, Sher, Dudhi, Kolar Kaweri major tributary of Narmada in Madhya Pradesh.

== Mahi Basin: Mahi ==
In Madhya Pradesh the Mahi Basin consists of the headwaters of the Mahi in Dhar and Jhabua districts; and the headwaters of the Anas River and Panam River in Jhabua District. This river crosses tropic of Cancer twice.

== Tapi Basin: Tapti ==
The Narmada, the Mahi and the Tapti River (Tapi) all flow westward into the Gulf of Khambat, of the Arabian Sea. The 724 km long Tapti is agriculturally very important as it drains an area of over 65,145sq km spread over Madhya Pradesh, Maharashtra and Gujarat. This river originates at a height of 762m in Betul district of Madhya Pradesh (to the south of the Satpura Range). The Tapti journeys almost parallel to the Narmada, though it is much shorter in length than the Narmada and has a smaller catchment area.

== Godavari Basin: Wainganga ==
In Madhya Pradesh the Godavari Basin consists of the headwaters of the Kanhan, including the Pench, and the headwaters of the Wainganga River. Wardha River, originating near Multai, is also part of the Godavari Basin. Wardha originates in the Satpura Range and flows into the Wainganga river to form the Pranhita river which finally joins the Godavari river.
