= Gara =

Gara may refer to:

- Gara (newspaper), a bilingual Spanish newspaper
- Gara (given name), a given name
- Gara (surname), a surname

== Geography ==
- Gara, Rohtas, a village in India
- Gara, Srikakulam, a village in India
- Gara, Hungary, a village in Hungary
- Gara, Kermanshah, a village in Kermanshah Province, Iran
- Gara River (Australia), in New South Wales, Australia
- El Gara, a town in Morocco
- Ancien Village de Gara, a village in the Central African Republic
- Alternative name for the Gaya confederacy
- Alternative spelling for Qara Oasis, Egypt
- Lough Gara, lake in counties Roscommon and Sligo, Ireland

=== Romania ===
- Gara, a village administered by Milişăuţi town, Suceava County, Romania
- Gara Banca, a village in Banca Commune, Vaslui County, Romania
- Gara Berheci, a village in Gohor Commune, Galați County, Romania
- Gara Bobocu, a village in Cochirleanca Commune, Buzău County, Romania
- Gara Cilibia, a village in Cilibia Commune, Buzău County, Romania
- Gara Docăneasa and Gara Tălăşman, villages in Vinderei Commune, Vaslui County, Romania
- Gara Ghidigeni, a village in Ghidigeni Commune, Galați County, Romania
- Gara Ianca, a village administered by Ianca town, Brăila County, Romania
- Gara Leu, a village in Drăguşeni Commune, Suceava County, Romania
- Gara Roşieşti, a village in Roşieşti Commune, Vaslui County, Romania
- Călăraşi Gară, a village in Călăraşi Commune, Cluj County, Romania
- Dâlga-Gară, a village in Dor Mărunt Commune, Călăraşi County, Romania
- Fetești-Gară, a village administered by Fetești town, Ialomița County, Romania
- Frăsinet-Gară, a village in Vlădila Commune, Olt County, Romania
- Lăculeţe-Gară, a village in Vulcana-Pandele Commune, Dâmboviţa County, Romania
- Lehliu Gară, a town in Călăraşi County, Romania
- Mărculeşti-Gară, a village in Perişoru Commune, Călăraşi County, Romania
- Moţăţei-Gară, a village in Moţăţei Commune, Dolj County, Romania
- Sărmășel-Gară, a village administered by Sărmașu town, Mureș County, Romania
- Săruleşti-Gară, a village in Săruleşti Commune, Călăraşi County, Romania
- Şintereag-Gară, a village in Şintereag Commune, Bistriţa-Năsăud County, Romania

== Ethnicity ==
- Garra people (also Gara) of Jammu and Kashmir

== Other uses ==
- General Aviation Revitalization Act (GARA)
- Gara (raga), a Hindustani classical raga
- Gaara, a fictional character from the manga and anime franchise Naruto
- Gara, a playable character from Warframe

== See also ==
- Lough Gara, a lake in Ireland
- Garas
- Garra (disambiguation)
