= Garra (disambiguation) =

Garra is a genus of fish in the family Cyprinidae.

Garra or GARRA may also refer to:

== People ==
- Garra people (sometimes Gara) of Kashmir
- Garra Dembélé (born 1986), French-born Malian football forward
- Garra Negra, Mexican professional wrestler
- Antonio Garra (born 1999), Cupeño tribe leader
- Korra Garra, Ethiopian writer
- Vic Garra (born 1935), Australian rules footballer

== Places ==
- Garra, Balaghat, village in Madhya Pradesh state, India
  - Garra railway station, station serving the village
- Garra, Iran, a village in Kermanshah Province, Iran

== Other uses ==
- Garra (album), 1971 album by Marcos Valle
- Grand American Road Racing Association, a motor sport governing body in North America

== See also ==
- Gaara, a fictional character from the manga and anime series Naruto
- Garah, New South Wales, Australia
- La Garra (disambiguation)
