= Gara (surname) =

Gara is a surname. Notable people with the name include:

- Andy Gara (born 1878), Irish footballer
- Anita Gara (born 1983), Hungarian chess grandmaster
- Akaliza Keza Gara, a Rwandan IT activist and entrepreneur
- Dave Gara, drummer for the band Skid Row
- Jeremy Gara (born 1978), Canadian drummer
- Józef Gara (1929–2013), Polish miner and poet
- Josh "Gara" Garland (born 1998), Canadian Bodybuilder
- Les Gara (born 1963), member of the Alaska House of Representatives
- Mehdi Gara (born 1981), former Tunisian male volleyball player
- Sonom Gara (fl. 13th century), Mongol Buddhist monk and translator
- Teresa Żylis-Gara (1930– 2021), Polish operatic soprano
- Ticia Gara (born 1984), Hungarian chess grandmaster
- Tony Gara, Zimbabwean politician

== See also ==
- Gara (disambiguation)
- Gara (given name)
- Garas
