= List of countries by number of doctorates awarded =

This is a list of countries by the number of PhD degrees awarded in 2014 as per data available with the OECD.

* indicates "Research in COUNTRY or TERRITORY" or "Universities in COUNTRY or TERRITORY" links.

Country	PhDs awarded (2014)
United States *	67,449
Germany *	28,147
Great Britain *	25,020
India *	24,300
Japan *	16,039
France *	13,729
South Korea *	12,931
Spain *	10,889
Italy *	10,678
Australia *	8,400
Canada *	7,059
Turkey *	4,516
Indonesia	3,591
Russia *	2,223
South Africa *	2,060
