= Top Management (video game) =

1990 video game

- Cover art (Family Computer version)
- Developer: Koei
- Publisher: Koei
- Series: Koei Executive Series
- Platforms: Nintendo Family Computer; NEC PC-9801
- Release: Family Computer: JP: December 12, 1990
- Genre: Business simulation strategy
- Modes: Single-player, multiplayer

Top Management (トップマネジメント) is a multiplatform business simulation video game that turns the player into a highly respected corporate title holder.

== Gameplay ==
In order for NEC (NEG) to get ahead in the virtual "business world," they must advertise their products in order to get the consumers to abandon Toshiba's (Tochiba) sphere of influence over top of them.

Using the management abilities provided by the game, players must turn their fledgling corporation (会社, kaisha) into a profitable super corporation. Created by Koei, the game was geared towards Japanese business students in high school, college, and university while also attempting to appeal to casual gamers who have an interest in learning how a Japanese corporation is operated.

Literacy in the Japanese language is required in addition to advanced arithmetic skills. Top Management features abstract art that serves as the game's graphics. A general business meeting is always held on the beginning of April as a measure to set things like employment levels, executive salaries, and financial benefits for the employees. Meetings held every other month focus on spreading advertisement throughout Japan, improving the performance of the products, and determining how many products to manufacture for sale on the open market.

The game is mostly text-based and players can choose between five major electronics companies to play as (IBN, Pujitsu, Tochiba, Charp and NEG, parodying IBM, Fujitsu, Toshiba, Sharp, and NEC). Like most business games, bankruptcy results in a game over. The NEC PC-9801 version was sold primarily as a research guide into the Japanese business world, with the ability to purchase licenses for up to 10 students and a teacher's version.

== Sequel ==
A sequel named Top Management II was later released for the Super Famicom in addition to the Windows operating system and for the NEC PC-9801. The game was essentially the same type of gameplay except with enhanced graphics.
