= Higher education in Japan =

Higher education in Japan is provided at universities (大学 daigaku), junior colleges (短期大学 tanki daigaku), colleges of technology (高等専門学校 kōtō senmon gakkō) and special training schools and community colleges (専修学校 senshū gakkō). Of these four types of institutions, only universities and junior colleges are strictly considered postsecondary education providers. The modern Japanese higher education system has undergone numerous changes since the Meiji period and was largely modeled after Western countries such as Britain, France, Germany, and the United States of America combined with traditional Japanese pedagogical elements to create a unique Japanese model to serve its national needs. Unlike higher education in some other countries, public universities in Japan are generally regarded as more prestigious than private universities, especially the National Seven Universities (University of Tokyo, Kyoto University, Tohoku University, Kyushu University, Hokkaido University, Osaka University, and Nagoya University).

According to the Ministry of Education, Culture, Sports, Science and Technology (MEXT), the percentage of Japanese going on to any higher education institution in the eighteen-year-old cohort was 80.6 percent, with 52.6 percent of students going on to a university, 4.7 percent to a junior college, 0.9 percent to a college of technology and the remaining 22.4 percent attending a correspondence school, the Open University of Japan, or a specialized training college.

== History ==
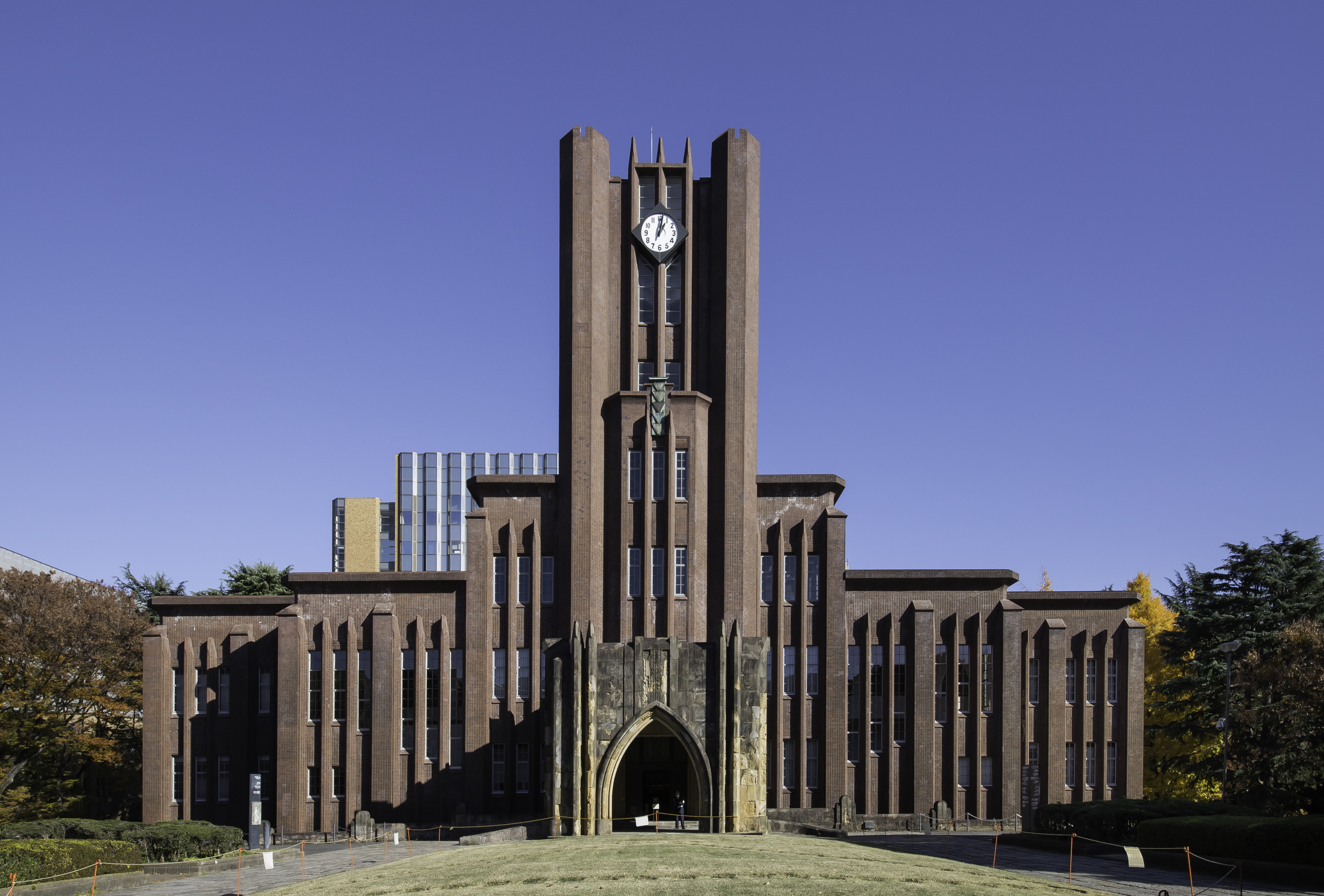
The University of Tokyo was founded as the nation's first university in 1877 by merging Edo-period institutions for higher education.

The modern Japanese higher education system was adapted from a number of methods and ideas inspired from Western education systems that were integrated with their traditional Shinto, Buddhist, and Confucianist pedagogical philosophies that served as the system's fundamental basis. Throughout the 19th and 20th centuries, many major reforms were introduced in the field of higher education across Japan, which contributed to individual work of students as well as the nation's overall originality, creativity, individuality, identity, and internationalization of higher education.

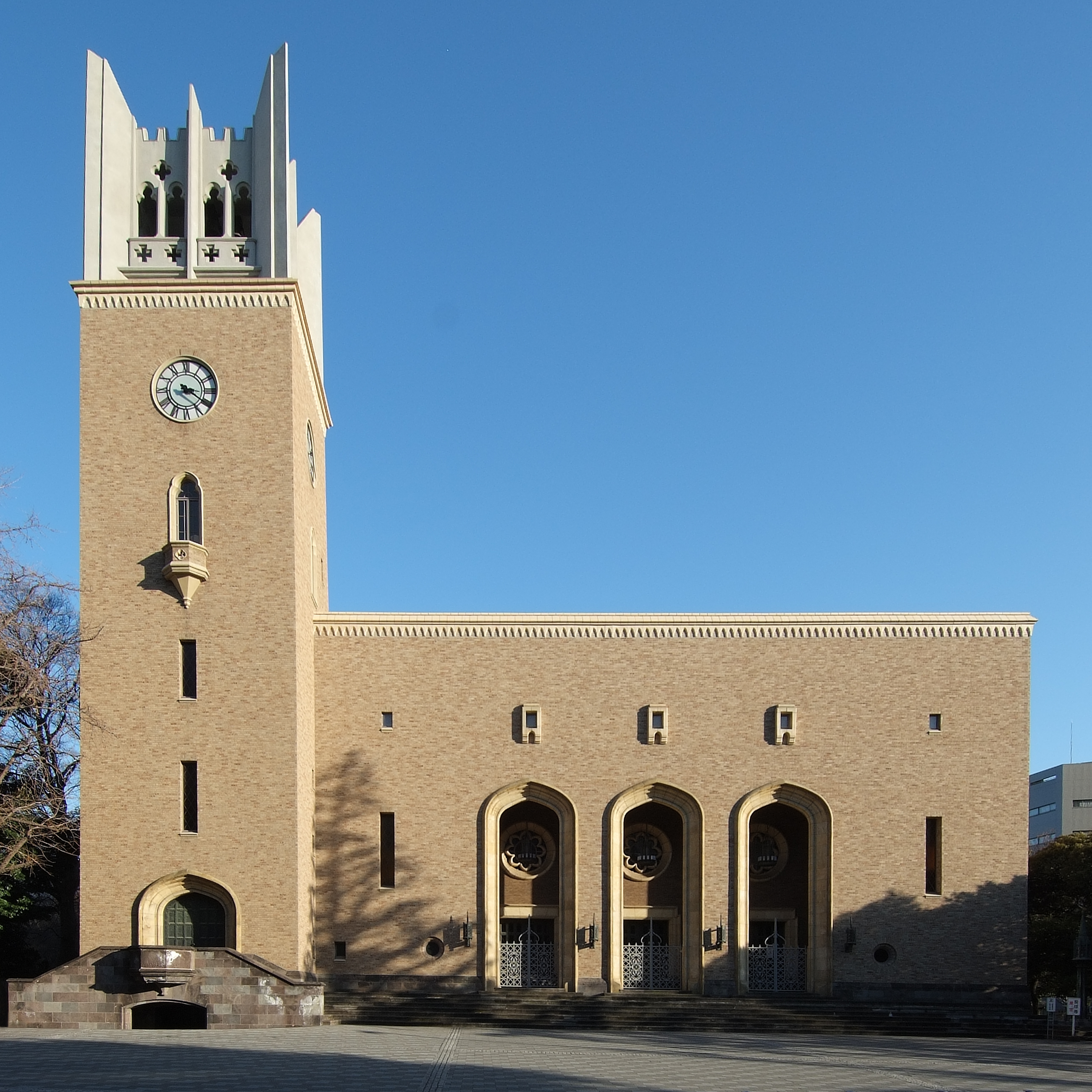
The first private universities were authorized in 1920; Waseda University was one of them.

During the Meiji Restoration of 1868, Japan actively embarked on a vigorous campaign of Westernization in order to modernize its education system, with a particular focus on higher education. This included a targeted effort in its focused initiative to revitalize its educational system, specifically emphasizing higher education, that would successfully assimilate its importation of transmitted Western knowledge to help realize the nation's ambitions to spur modern industrialization. Numerous Japanese university students were dispatched to Europe for academic purposes, while several foreign scholars from Western nations were also welcomed to Japan during the same time period to conduct an exchange of academic pursuits. During the 1880s, Japan sought to search for a higher education system prototype to model in order to suit its national needs. In 1881, the Meiji government decided to convert its institutional model, influenced from a variety of Western countries such as Great Britain, the United States and France, to a strictly German-oriented model as the Prussian model of higher education greatly interested the Meiji government at the time.

Prussia served as the largest inspiration for the modern Japanese higher education system, as German universities were regarded as one of the most innovative in all of Europe in addition to 19th-century Germany being close to Japan in its goals for industrialization. Furthermore, the Meiji government greatly admired the Prussian government bureaucracy, largely dominated by law school graduates, and it sought to absorb the Prussian prototype into the unique Japanese model. Inspired by the American, British, and French models on top of a predominantly-Prussian prototype that served as the fundamental basis for the Japanese model, Japan's modern higher education system soon became a catalyzing impetus that propelled the island archipelago's development as a major world power during the late 19th and the early 20th centuries.

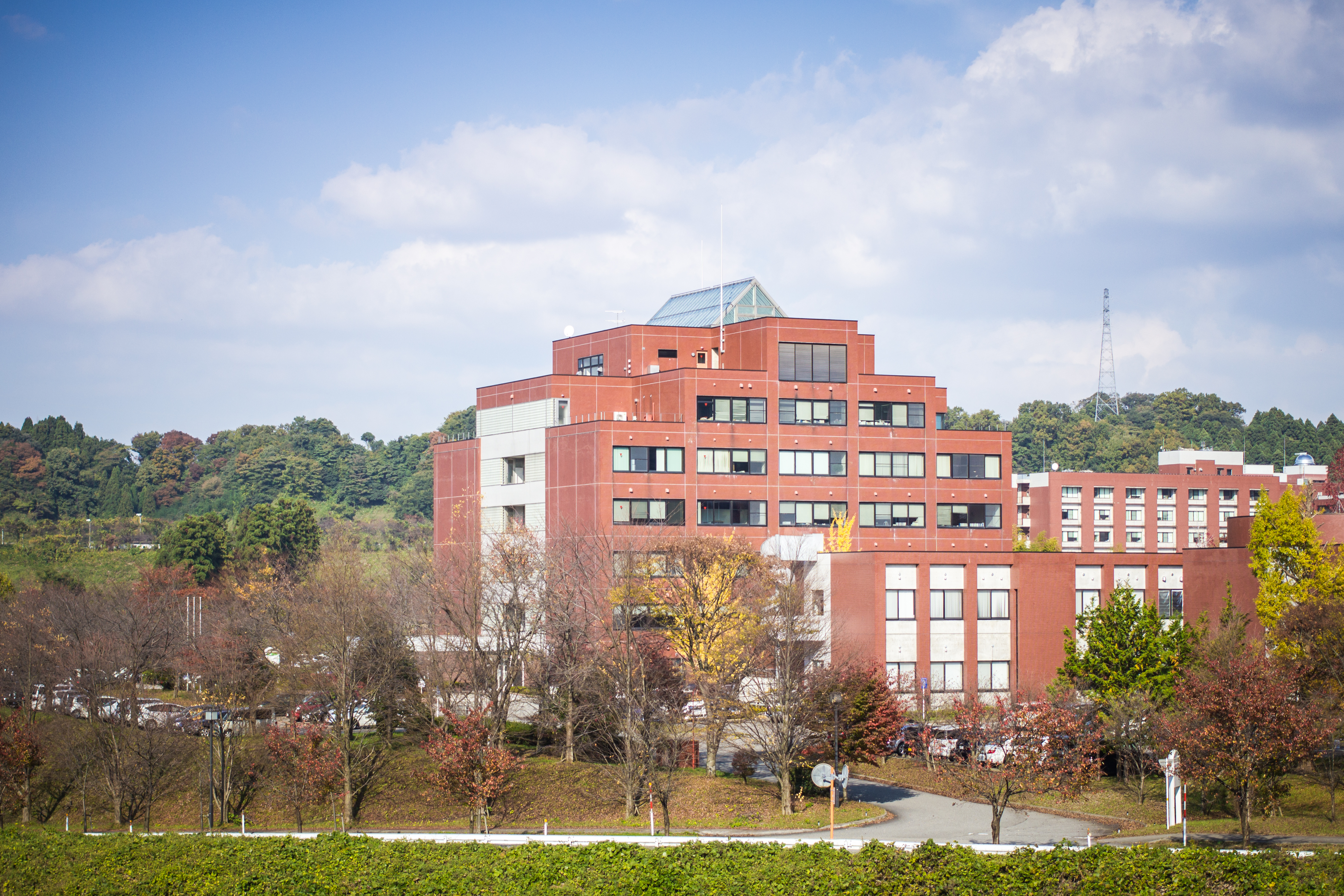
Kanazawa University, founded in 1949; the immediate aftermath of the Second World War saw the establishment of new universities across the country.

At the higher education level, Japan sought to incorporate a number of higher education ideas to suit its national needs. Many books, manuscripts, and documents from the West were translated and foreign professors were common during the Meiji era to disseminate Western knowledge in the arts and sciences as well as Western pedagogical teaching methods. For a modern university model, Japan incorporated many Prussian elements found in that of Germany as the German Empire at the time was similar to Japan in terms of goals for colonial expansion and national development. The German model continued to inspire the Japanese higher education system until the end of World War I. During the American occupation of World War II, Japan incorporated higher education ideas developed in the United States to modernize its higher education for the contemporary era. The contemporary Japanese higher education system now boasts elements incorporated from the United States on top of its European origins. The expansion and development of modern higher education in Japan has contributed to its economic growth after World War II which continued on until the late 1980s.

== University ==
=== Entrance ===
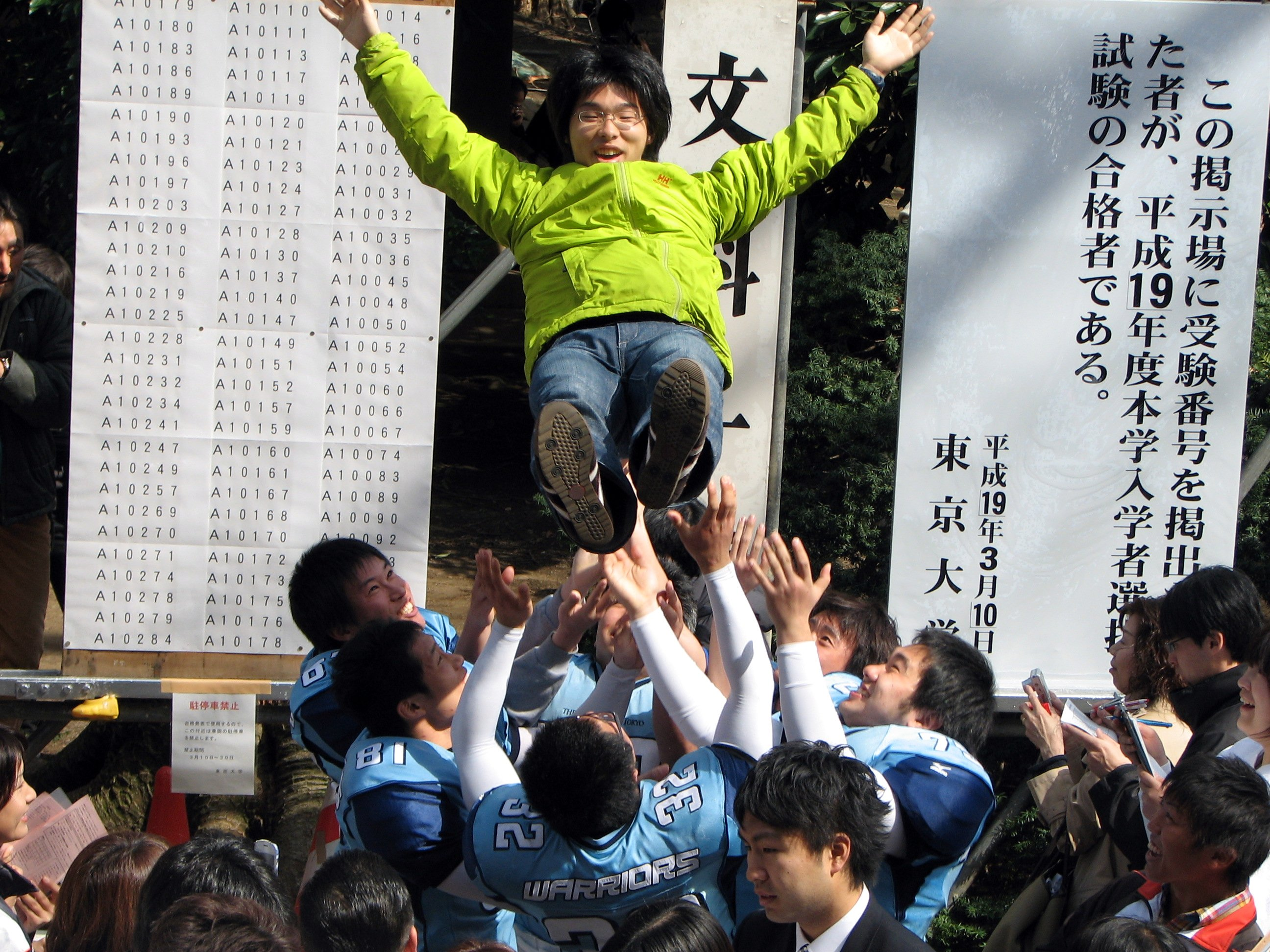
Passing the entrance exam to a university is a major life step for a young Japanese person.

University entrance is the traditional route taken by Japanese students to enter the gateway of higher education as it is by far the most prestigious form of higher education in the country. In contrast to the practice of relying on grade point averages and percentages for assessing eligibility in countries like Canada and the United States, entrance to universities in Japan is primarily determined by the scores obtained in entrance examinations (nyūgaku shiken (入学試験)), which serve as the main criteria for university admission. People enrolled in undergraduate schools are awarded bachelor's degrees which take four to six years. Graduate schools award master's (2 years), doctoral (3 years), and professional degrees (2–3 years). Though 88.7 percent of Japanese universities are private, the top ten universities in Japan are elite research institutions where 8 of them are national (University of Tokyo, Kyoto University, Tohoku University, Kyushu University, Hokkaido University, Osaka University, Nagoya University, and the Tokyo Institute of Technology) and the remaining two being private institutions (Keio University and Waseda University). Private institutions accounted for nearly 80% of all university enrollments in 1991, but with a few exceptions such as Waseda University and Keio University, the public national universities are more highly regarded, especially the National Seven Universities which are the most prestigious. This distinction had its origins in historical factors—the long years of dominance of the select imperial universities, such as the University of Tokyo and the University of Kyoto, which trained Japan's leaders before the war—and also in differences in quality, particularly in facilities and faculty ratios.

In order to secure employment at a major Japanese corporation or an international company that is based in Japan, earning a degree from a prestigious university isn't mandatory. Yet, certain prestigious employers throughout the country, most notably the Japanese government and a select number of large Japanese corporations (e.g. those listed in Nikkei 225), continue to restrict their hiring of prospective employees to graduates of the nation's most esteemed universities. In the context of employment recruitment, the educational background of individuals from universities holds considerable importance and remains a crucial element in the hiring process. This is due to the well-established connection between the reputation of the university a person graduated from and their chances of obtaining desirable job opportunities and promising career paths. Attending a prestigious Japanese university, particularly one known for a strong academic reputation, can often be the pivotal tiebraker in securing a lucrative, prestigious, and secure white-collar profession. Due to the paramount significance that this determining factor holds in the recruitment and hiring process, Japanese employers continue to place a high value on academic achievements, educational background, co-op and internship experience, as well as the reputation of educational institutions when assessing and selecting highly qualified candidates for job vacancies. Amongst prospective university applicants who aspire to enter the halls of the nation's most prestigious universities, competition in securing and matriculating the most highly sought-after spots at the country's most esteemed universities continues to remain fierce. A common custom practiced by Japanese employers is simultaneous recruiting of new graduates.

Students applying to national or other public universities take two entrance examinations. Firstly, a nationally administered uniform multiple-choice achievement test (大学入学共通テスト, Daigaku Nyūgaku Kyōtsū Tesuto), and then an examination separately administered by the university the student hopes to enter (niji shiken (二次試験)). For example, for the University of Tokyo, the second exam includes five subjects: mathematics, Japanese, one foreign language, and either two natural sciences subjects or two social sciences subjects. For national and public universities, applicants usually have only one chance, as all national and public universities conduct exams on the same dates (25, 26, and 27 February). Applicants to private universities typically need to take only the university's examination, usually covering fewer subjects (1-3), and they are allowed to apply to as many universities and degrees as they want, as long as the test dates don't overlap.

Such intense competition means that many students cannot compete successfully for admission to the university of their choice. An unsuccessful student can either accept an admission elsewhere, forgo a college education, or wait until the following spring to take the national examinations again. A large number of students choose the last option. These students, called ronin, meaning masterless samurai, spend an entire year, and sometimes longer, studying and making preparations to secure another opportunity to attempt at the entrance examinations. In 2011, the number of ronin who took the uniform test was 110,211, while the number of high school students who took the test was 442,421.

Yobikou are private schools that, like many juku, help students prepare for entrance examinations. While yobikou have many programs for upper-secondary school students, they are best known for their specially designed full-time, year-long classes for ronin. The number of applicants to four-year universities totaled almost 560,000 in 1988. Ronin accounted for about 40% of new entrants to four-year colleges in 1988. Most ronin were men, but about 14% were women. The ronin experience is so common in Japan that the Japanese education structure is often said to have an extra ronin year built into it.

Yobikou sponsor a variety of programs, both full-time and part-time, and employ an extremely sophisticated battery of tests, student counseling sessions, and examination analysis to supplement their classroom instruction. The cost of yobikou education is high, comparable to first-year university expenses, and some specialized courses at yobikou are even more expensive. Some yobikou publish modified commercial versions of the proprietary texts they use in their classrooms through publishing affiliates or by other means, and these are popular among the general population preparing for college entrance exams. Yobikou also administer practice examinations throughout the year, which they open to all students for a fee.

In the late 1980s, the examination and entrance process were the subjects of renewed debate. In 1987 the schedule of the Joint First Stage Achievement Test was changed, and the content of the examination itself was revised for 1990. The schedule changes for the first time provided some flexibility for students wishing to apply to more than one national university. The new Joint First Stage Achievement Test was prepared and administered by the National Center for University Entrance Examinations and was designed to accomplish better assessment of academic achievement.

The Ministry of Education, Science, Sports and Culture (Monbusho), the predecessor of MEXT, hoped many private schools would adopt or adapt the new national test to their own admissions requirements and thereby reduce or eliminate the university tests. But, by the time the new test was administered in 1990, few schools had displayed any inclination to do so. The ministry urged universities to increase the number of students admitted through alternate selection methods, including admission of students returning to Japan from long overseas stays, admission by recommendation, and admission of students who had graduated from upper-secondary schools more than a few years before. Although a number of schools had programs in place or reserved spaces for returning students, only 5% of university students were admitted under these alternate arrangements in the late 1980s.

Other college entrance issues include proper guidance for college placement at the upper-secondary level and better dissemination of information about university programs. The ministry provides information through the National Center for University Entrance Examination's on-line information access system and encourages universities, faculties, and departments to prepare brochures and video presentations about their programs.

=== Scandal ===
In response to allegations of bribery perpetrated by a former MEXT official, Futoshi Sano, who reportedly exchanged funds in return for a place for his son at Tokyo Medical University, an investigation into university officials began. The investigation found that priority was given to legacy applicants. In August 2018, the university was found to have manipulated entrance examination scores in order to artificially lower the number of female test-takers and male test re-takers who were able to enter the university. The investigation revealed that a computerized system that automatically deducted points from the final scores of female applicants and male re-takers had been in place since at least 2006. After the correction of the system in 2019, "the pass ratio for women was 20.2 percent, 0.4 percentage point higher than that of men. [In 2018], the successful ratio for women was only 2.9 percent, while that of men was 9 percent."

The incident made international headlines, many of which denounced the pervasive sexism of higher education in Japan, working culture in Japan, and of Japanese society in general. The Yomiuri Shimbun newspaper quoted an unknown source at the university who attempted to explain the rationale for the discrimination, saying "many female students who graduate end up leaving the actual medical practice to give birth and raise children."

In a subsequent government investigation of universities throughout Japan, several other medical schools, including Juntendo University and Showa University were found to have manipulated scores in a similar way. In December 2018, three additional universities – Iwate Medical University, Kanazawa Medical University, and Fukuoka University – also admitted to the manipulation of women's entrance exam scores.

=== Universities ===
In 2017, more than 2.89 million students were enrolled in Japan's 780 universities. At the top of the higher education structure are research institutions that provide four-year training leading to a bachelor's degree, and some offer six-year programs leading to a professional degree. There are two types of public four-year colleges: the 86 national universities (including The Open University) and the 95 local public universities, founded by prefectures and municipalities. The 597 remaining four-year colleges in 2010 were private. With a wealth of opportunities for students wishing to pursue a university education, the nation's prestigious universities are the most appealing for students seeking to gain the top notch employment prospects, particularly with the government and large corporations.

The overwhelming majority of university students attend full-time day programs. In 2005, the most popular courses, enrolling almost 38% of all undergraduate students, were in the social sciences, including business administration, law, and accounting. Other popular subjects were engineering (17.3%), the humanities (16%), and education (5.7%).

The average costs (tuition, fees, and living expenses) for a year of higher education in 1986 were 1.4 million Yen(US$10,000), of which parents paid a little less than 80%, or about 20% of the average family's income in 1986. To help defray expenses, students frequently work part-time or borrow money through the government-supported Japan Scholarship Association. Assistance also is offered by local governments, nonprofit corporations, and other institutions.

In 2005, there were approximately 89 females for every 100 males enrolled in post-secondary education in Japan, and their numbers are still slowly increasing. Women's choices of majors and programs of study still tend to follow traditional patterns, with more than two-thirds of all women enrolling in education, social sciences, or humanities courses. Only 15% studied scientific and technical subjects, and women represented less than 3% of students in engineering, the most popular subject for men in 1991.

The quality of universities and higher education in Japan is internationally recognized. There are 50 Japanese universities listed on the 2025 QS World University Rankings, with the University of Tokyo at 32nd and Kyoto University at 50th.

=== Postgraduate education ===
Graduate schools became a part of the Japanese higher education system only after World War II and were still not stressed in the 1990s. Even though 60 percent of all universities have graduate schools, only 7 percent of university graduates advance to master's programs, and total graduate school enrollment is about 4% of the entire university student population.

The pattern of graduate enrollment is almost the opposite of that of undergraduates: the majority (63%) of all graduate students are enrolled in the national universities, and it appears that the disparity between public and private graduate enrollments is widening. Graduate education is largely a male preserve, and women, particularly at the master's level, are most heavily represented in the liberal arts, humanities, social sciences, and education. Men are frequently found in engineering programs where, at the master's level, women comprise only 2 percent of the students. At the doctoral level, the two highest levels of female enrollment are found in medical programs and the humanities, where in both fields 30 percent of doctoral students are women. Women account for about 13 percent of all doctoral enrollments.

The low enrollment of graduate students and the profile of graduate enrollment are influenced by various factors, primarily the conventional employment practices in the industry. In the Japanese private sector, the demand for individuals holding advanced degrees, especially in fields outside of the hard sciences such as the liberal arts, social sciences, and humanities is low compared to other industrialized nations. This discrepancy can be attributed to the prevalent focus on science and technology within the Japanese economy, leading companies to favor hiring recent university graduates and providing them with on-the-job training to adhere to company protocols.

== Vocational education ==
Though university is the most prestigious form of higher education in Japan, a number of Japanese students choose to attend vocational schools instead. Vocational schools provide students with employment skills without them having to undertake the pressure of the national university entrance exam. In Japan, parents traditionally place a higher emphasis on traditional academic education rather than vocational education. Vocational school remains as a backup option for students with lower grades or those who come from lower socioeconomic backgrounds. Vocational schools have not only been successful in attracting secondary school graduates with lower grades but also university graduates who weren't able to secure employment upon graduation.

=== Junior colleges ===
Junior colleges (短期大学, tanki daigaku) – mainly private institutions – are a legacy of the occupation period; many had been prewar institutions upgraded to college status at that time. More than two-thirds of the students in junior colleges are women as many attend them as a form of preparation for a short-term career before marriage. Students who complete the course of study at a junior college are awarded an associate degree or a diploma. Junior colleges offer vocational education with a practical applicability as these institutes train people who will work in early childhood education or in health care.

Though the enrollment number of women going to junior colleges is decreasing as more Japanese women desire to gain access to more white-collar professional careers and have been choosing to attend universities in greater numbers. Junior colleges provide many women with vocational credentials to help them navigate through Japan's job market. These colleges frequently emphasize early childhood education, home economics, nursing, teaching, liberal arts, humanities, and social sciences in their curricula. Many polytechnic junior colleges have a small campus with several hundred students. Junior colleges also train people who are studying to become mid-level technicians in civil, mechanical, electrical, and systems engineering sectors. Graduates of polytechnic colleges have a very high rate of employment, as Japan's dominant high technology sector offers a high demand for skilled technicians.

=== Special training schools and community colleges ===
Special training schools and community colleges (senmon gakkō (専門学校) in Japanese) are two-year specialist schools that offer advanced courses for vocational careers that require upper-secondary school completion.

Specialized training colleges are not regulated by MEXT. These institutions are less competitive and simpler to enroll in than a university. These institutions awarded an associate degree or a "Diploma" after 2 years of study and an "Advanced Diploma" after three years. People holding a diploma are eligible to transfer to a four-year university and people holding an advanced diploma are eligible to enter a graduate school. These schools offer programs that are classified into eight fields of study: industry, agriculture, medical care, health, education, and social welfare. They offer training in specific skills related to fields such as carpentry, graphic design, hotel management, home economics, hairdressing, fashion design, typing, culinary arts, computer science, engineering, liberal arts, agriculture, early childhood education, bookkeeping, hygiene, foreign languages, therapy, dietetics and medicine. Most graduates of special training schools and community colleges do not continue on to university but instead join the workforce right after graduating. These institutions enroll a large number of men. Some students attend these schools in addition to attending a university to enhance their educational background and broaden their employment opportunities while others go to qualify for technical licenses or professional certifications. The prestige of special training schools is lower than that of universities, but graduates, particularly in technical areas, are readily absorbed by the job market. 80 percent of special training school and community college graduates are able to secure employment and about 90 percent found jobs in fields related to what they have studied.

A number of special training school and community colleges have created a dual education philosophy where students are able to take classes at a university and a special training school at the same time. Educational programs are organized through a timetable where a student can attend classes at a special training school in the morning and a university in the afternoon. Using this approach, a student can learn a variety of subjects at a university and gain vocational skills simultaneously at a special training school. Upon graduation, both the bachelor's degree awarded by the university and the associate degree or diploma awarded by the special training school are granted at the same time.

=== Colleges of technology ===
Colleges of technology (高等専門学校, kosen) in Japan are trade and technical schools training skilled tradespeople and mid level technicians. These schools offer apprenticeships, associate degrees, diplomas, licenses, and certificates for skilled trades and technical careers. Colleges of technology also offer certifications for workers in support roles in professions such as engineering, information technology, accountancy, business administration, nursing, medicine, architecture, and law. The five-year programs are offered within a number of fields such as broadcasting, business administration, computer science, arboriculture, medical care, web development, robotics, biotechnology, environmental technology and engineering. For the industrial trades, students can also take courses in subjects such as applied chemistry, industrial chemistry, public works, merchant marine shipping, drafting, CNC machinery operation and tool programming, construction management, landscape horticulture, early childhood education, livestock management, land surveying, city planning, interior design, and food inspection. Other trade specialties offered by colleges of technology include wastewater treatment plant operating, plastering, drywalling, home inspection, landscape and park maintenance, power engineering, power plant operation, power line and security systems installation and servicing, telecommunications and broadband installation and servicing, culinary arts, appliance and HVAC servicing, heat and frost insulation, pipeline maintenance, pipe-laying, ironworking, gasfitting, elevator systems installation and servicing, electronics and electronic equipment servicing, steamfitting, steel fabrication, plumbing, electrical works and electrical servicing, masonry, roofing, warehousing, carpentry, machine operation, welding, marine shipping maintenance and servicing, aviation and aircraft maintenance and servicing, automobile and vehicle servicing, and power equipment servicing.

As the Japanese economy began to experience major growth in the 1950s, major Japanese corporations lobbied the national government to place a stronger emphasis on vocational education to fill in the skills gap. Private colleges of technology were established in 1961 in response to Japan's growing need for vocational education as well as changing industry needs for well-trained manpower of tradespeople and technicians across the Japanese economy, especially the automotive industry and the industrial sector. There, high school age students acquire trade and technical skills through work-based learning, apprenticeships, and work placement programs. While university is by far the most prestigious form of education in Japan, many Japanese students choose to attend colleges of technology as an alternative route. These schools allow them to gain job skills without the intense pressure of the university admissions process. Many students attend specifically to get professional certifications and then proceed to enter the workforce afterwards. However, it is also common for university graduates to attend colleges of technology if their efforts to secure a job with a university degree are to no avail.

70 colleges of technology have been operating since the early 1960s. A small percentage of college technology graduates transfer to universities as third-year students, and some universities such as the University of Tokyo and the Tokyo Institute of Technology even earmarked entrance places for transfer students of colleges of technology in the 1980s who wished to continue to pursue and attain a university-level education. Students are eligible to enter colleges of technology halfway through their senior secondary years. College of technology programs usually last for 5 years. This system of institutions was founded in 1961 and they have enjoyed increased popularity as an alternative route besides the traditional path of going to university. Graduates of colleges of technology have been successful in navigating Japan's high-tech labor market as they been swamped with job offers despite Japan's sluggish economy during the 1990s.

Graduates of colleges of technology are awarded associate degrees or diplomas, which are respected by employers but are ranked below bachelor's degrees in terms of prestige. Many graduates of colleges of technology starting out move from company to company to gain experience and to move up into sales and upper-level management roles. After spending years gaining experience and honing their skills, some go on to become managers where they are able to supervise entire projects as well as younger apprentices. Nevertheless, technical graduates usually find employment immediately upon graduation. Technical education in the skilled trades and technical careers continues to be a solid option for Japanese high school graduates who enjoy working with their hands and have no plans of attending university.

One of the most well known colleges of technology in Japan is Nihon Kogakuin College, which is part of the Katayanagi Institute group. The school has offered industrial education for skilled trades and technical careers since its establishment in 1947. The school today proactively accepts foreign students due to the country's labor shortage of skilled technicians in Japan's information technology industry. With about 10,000 graduates a year, Kosen colleges have not produced nearly enough graduates to meet the demands of Japanese industry as major corporations would give preference in job offers to foreign-trained students, who are perceived as more competent in the workplace than graduates of Japan's four-year universities.

In Western Japan, the leading college of technology is the Kobe Institute of Computing. KIC was founded by Mr Tomio Fukuoka in 1958 as a small Electronics school in the city of Kobe, Hyogo prefecture, Japan, which was called Kobe Denshi and received recognition as an "Institute of Advanced Vocational Education" from the Japanese Ministry of Education in 1988 for its vital contribution to Japanese computing society. KIC is the first IT College in Asia. Now, KIC is one of the major institutes for professional, vocational, and practice-oriented education in ICT and other digital industries in Japan with 17,700 alumni.

A 2004 white paper from the Japanese Ministry of Education, Culture, Sports, Science and Technology indicated that the colleges of technology are leaders in the use of apprenticeships and internships, with more than 90% of institutions offering this opportunity compared to 46% of universities and 24% of junior colleges. As of 2008, 23.1% of high school graduates study at colleges of technology with 99.6% being employed after graduation.
