= Garas =

Garas is a surname. Notable people with the surname include:

- Dániel Garas (born 1973), Hungarian cinematographer and photographer
- Dezső Garas (1934–2011), Hungarian actor
- François Garas (1866-1925), French architect and painter
- Kaz Garas (born 1940), Lithuanian-American actor
- Sven Garas (born 1978), Norwegian pop musician, songwriter and producer

== See also ==
- Gara (surname)
- Gara (disambiguation)
