= Aurel Vlaicu Flight School =

Aurel Vlaicu Flight School
- Școala de Aplicație pentru Forțele Aeriene
- Boboc, Buzău County in Romania
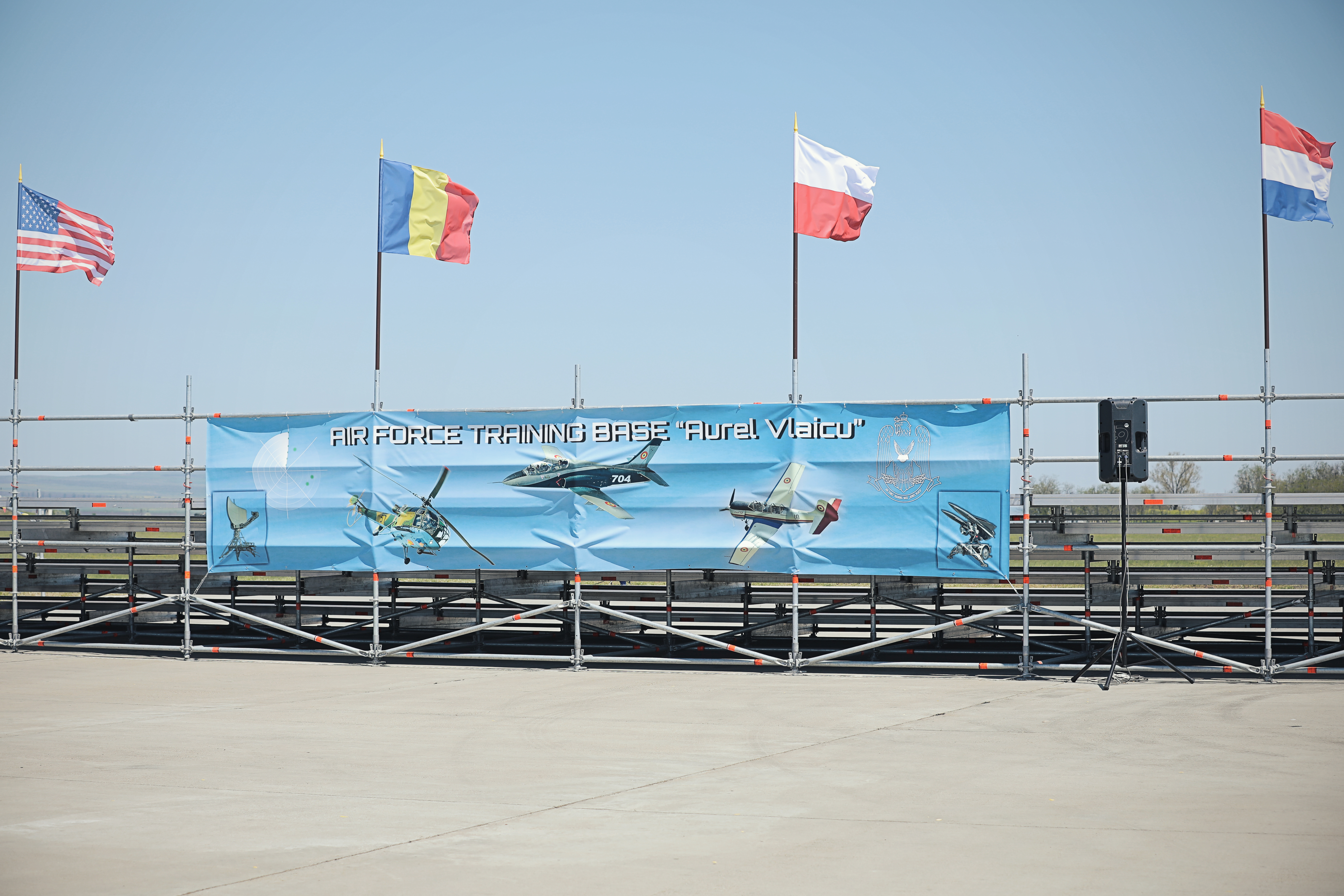
- Boboc Air Base during exercise Swift Response 21

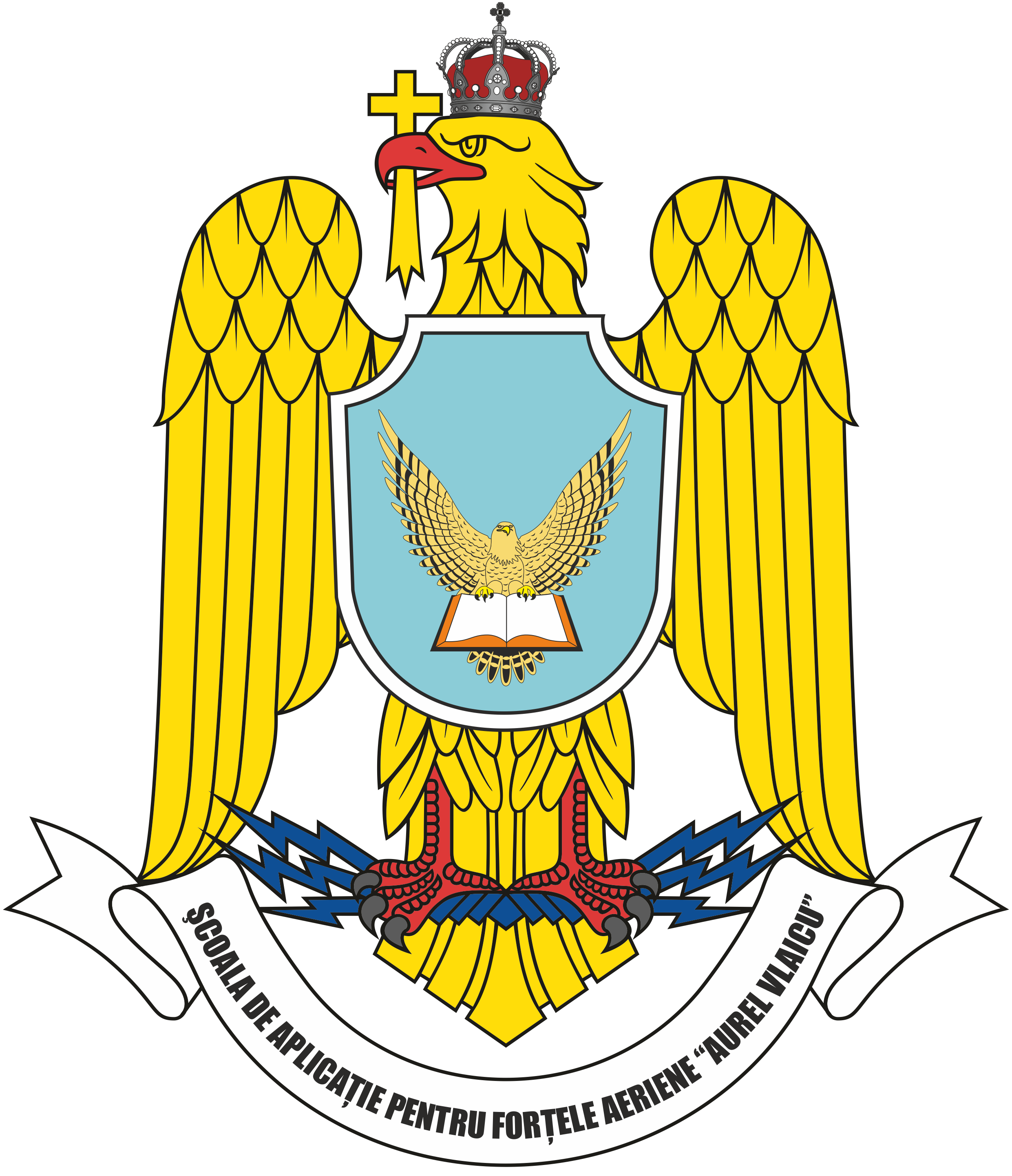
- Coat of arms of the "Aurel Vlaicu" Air Force Flight School

Site information
- Owner: Ministry of National Defence
- Operator: Romanian Air Force

Location
- Location within Romania Location within Europe
- Coordinates: 45°13′04″N 26°58′29″E

Site history
- Built: 1929–1939
- In use: 1939–Present

Garrison information
- Current commander: General de flotilă aeriană Anton Ovidiu Bălan
- Occupants: 1st Aviation Squadron; 2nd Aviation Squadron

Airfield information
- Identifiers: ICAO: LRBO
- Elevation: 105 metres (344 ft) AMSL
Runways
Direction	Length and surface
04/22	2,500 metres (8,202 ft) Concrete

The Aurel Vlaicu Flight School (Școala de Aplicație pentru Forțele Aeriene "Aurel Vlaicu"), also known as Boboc Air Base, is the Romanian Air Force flight training school based at Boboc, Buzău County. Originally located at the Boboc airfield starting from 1939, the school was re-established as the Aurel Vlaicu Aviation Officers School in 1953, and moved back to Boboc in 1958. Since August 2003, as a result of the Air Force transformation and re-sizing, the Air Force Flight School is the main training facility for the three main air force branches: air force, surface-to-air missiles, and radiolocation.

The base hosts two training squadrons equipped with IAK-52 and IAR 99 airplanes and IAR 316 helicopters. Bayraktar TB2 drones operated by the Romanian Land Forces are also deployed at the base.

== History ==
=== Origins ===
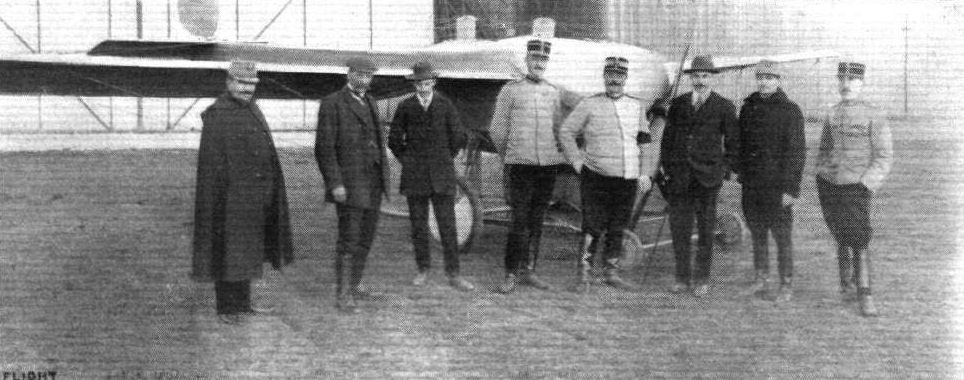
Major Ion Macri (4th from the right) at Cotroceni in 1912

The first training school of the Romanian military aviation was established in 1912 in Cotroceni, under the command of Major Ion Macri. The same year, a second school which allowed military pilots to be trained was established by Prince George Valentin Bibescu in Băneasa. Both functioned until 1915 when the Cotroceni flight school was disbanded, and its specialists were transferred to the Băneasa school.

With the events during the First World War, the school was evacuated successively to Tecuci, Bârlad, and Botoșani. From June 1917, the pilots and observer schools were split with the former being moved to Odesa, and the latter to Vaslui.

After the war, an officer training school functioned in Cotroceni, a military pilot school in Tecuci. The Școala de perfecționare pentru piloți de război functioned in Buzău with the task of continuing the flight training of the graduates of the schools in Cotroceni and Tecuci. In the 1920s, training started on Morane-Saulnier aircraft, then continued on Fokker D.XI or Blériot-SPAD S.61 for fighter pilots, and on Potez XV or Potez 25 for reconnaissance pilots. Due to the need of training aircraft at the School from Tecuci, a number of 120 Hansa-Brandenburg C.I were built at the Aeronautical Arsenal between 1922 and 1923.

In 1929, the lands previously owned by Alexandru Marghiloman were ceded for the benefit of aeronautics and aviators decorated with the Order of Aeronautical Virtue. The same year, construction on the Ziliștea-Boboc airdrome began, where the future aviation school was to be located. The new airdrome had a modern concrete runway and became operational in 1939. In 1940, the schools of Tecuci and Buzău were moved to Ziliștea-Boboc. During World War II, the airfield was used by the Royal Romanian Air Force to launch bombing raids into Bessarabia. From the spring of 1943, Luftwaffe units such as Jagdgeschwader 52 and Nachtjagdgeschwader 6 also began using the airdrome. After the war, the schools were disbanded, but from 1948 the military aviation education began to be reorganized in Sibiu, Mediaș, and Tecuci.

=== 1958 to present ===
The Military Aviation School No. 1 from Tecuci was renamed to the "Aurel Vlaicu" Aviation Officers School in 1953. This school was then moved to the Boboc airfield in 1958. It was used to train military pilots, civil aviation pilots, and non-flying personnel. Before 1989, school instructors were also sent to Angola where a school was formed on the model of the Romanian school.

In 1991, the school was transformed into the Aurel Vlaicu Military Aviation Institute, then into the Aurel Vlaicu Aviation School in 1997. The theoretical part of training was taken over by the Henri Coandă Air Force Academy from Brașov. After the school became the main training facility for the three main air force branches: air force, surface-to-air missile, and radiolocation on 1 August 2003, it was renamed to the School of Application for the Air Force. In 2007, the runway infrastructure was modernized, and a flight simulator for the IAR 99 Șoim was put into service. In 2008, the Air Force Training Center was established.

In 2010, with the 100th anniversary of Aurel Vlaicu's flight, the base was decorated with the Order of Aeronautical Virtue Officer Class. In 2022, it also received the Knight Class of the order. In 2025, it was announced that Bayraktar TB2 drones of the Romanian Land Forces along with operating and command structures have been deployed to the base.

== Structure ==
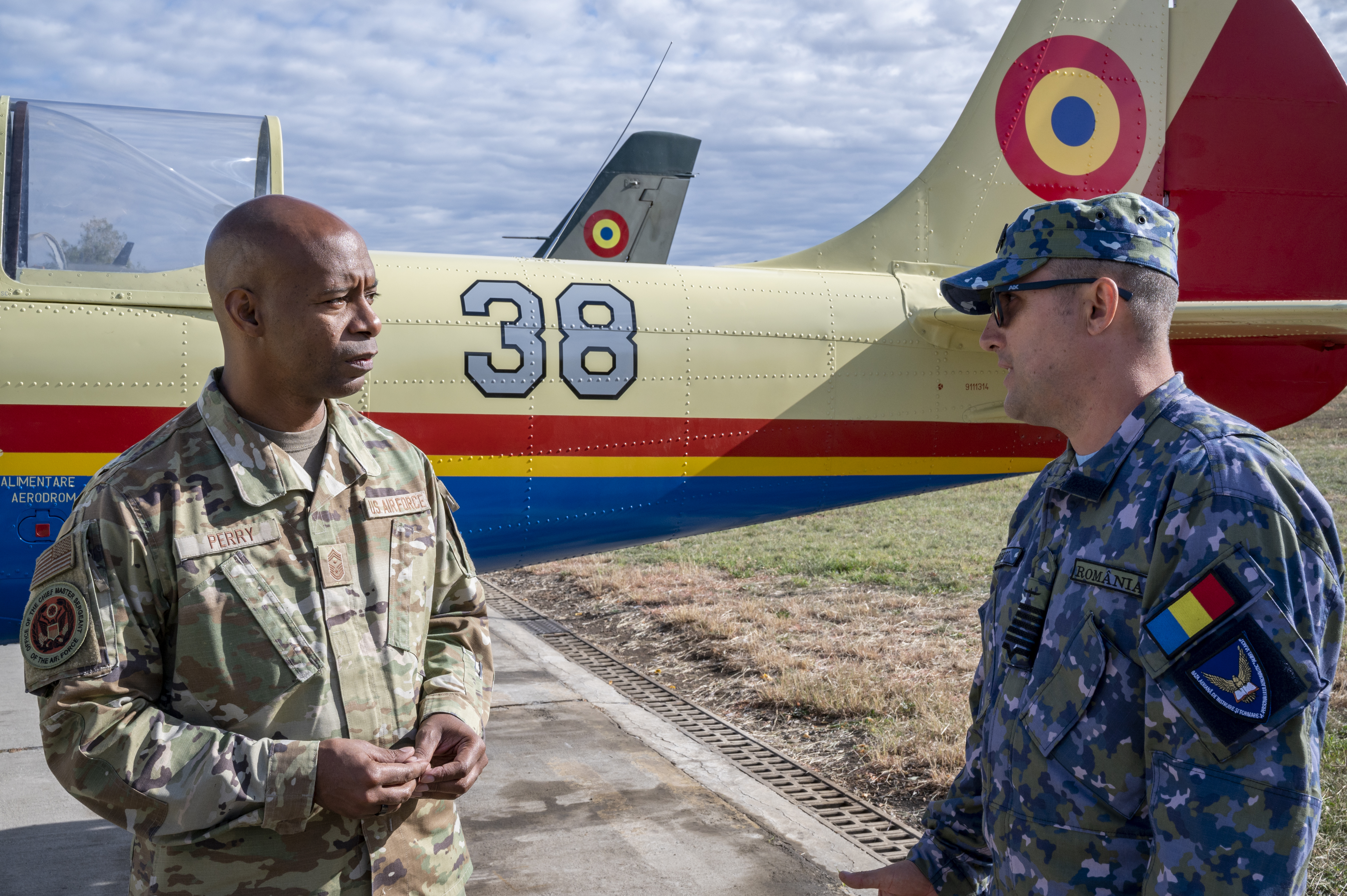
US Air Force Chief Master Sergeant Nathaniel Perry during a visit to Boboc Air Base in 2022

=== Air Force Interarm Training School ===
Within the Air Force Interarm Training School (SIIFA), education for the aviation, artillery and surface-to-air Missiles, and radiolocation is carried out by the Air Force Training Center (CIFA). The center conducts training courses for officers, warrant officers, non-commissioned officers, soldiers and professional graduates of the Air Force Staff, but also for specialized personnel for the Naval Forces, the Land Forces and the other structures of the defense, public order and national security.

CIFA also has a Secondary English Language Learning Center, with courses for improving the level of English language skills as well as the assimilation of NATO operational terminology. The courses are intended for military and civilian personnel from the Ministry of National Defence.

=== Aviation training group ===
The Aviation Training Group is a structure of the "Aurel Vlaicu" Flight School meant to train and develop the piloting skills of students from the Air Force Academy and the graduating officers.

The Aviation Training Group has the following squadrons:

- 1st Aviation Squadron – operating IAK-52W/TW and IAR 316B;
- 2nd Aviation Squadron – operating IAR 99 Standard.

=== Operational and support units ===
- Air Operations Center
- Operational Center
- Force Protection Group
  - Anti-Aircraft Artillery Battalion
  - Military Police Company
- Support Group
  - Air Communications and Air Navigation Technical Systems Company
  - Transport Company

== Decorations ==
The Air Force Flight School has received the following decorations:

- Order of Aeronautical Virtue, Peacetime (Officer – 2010)

== Gallery ==
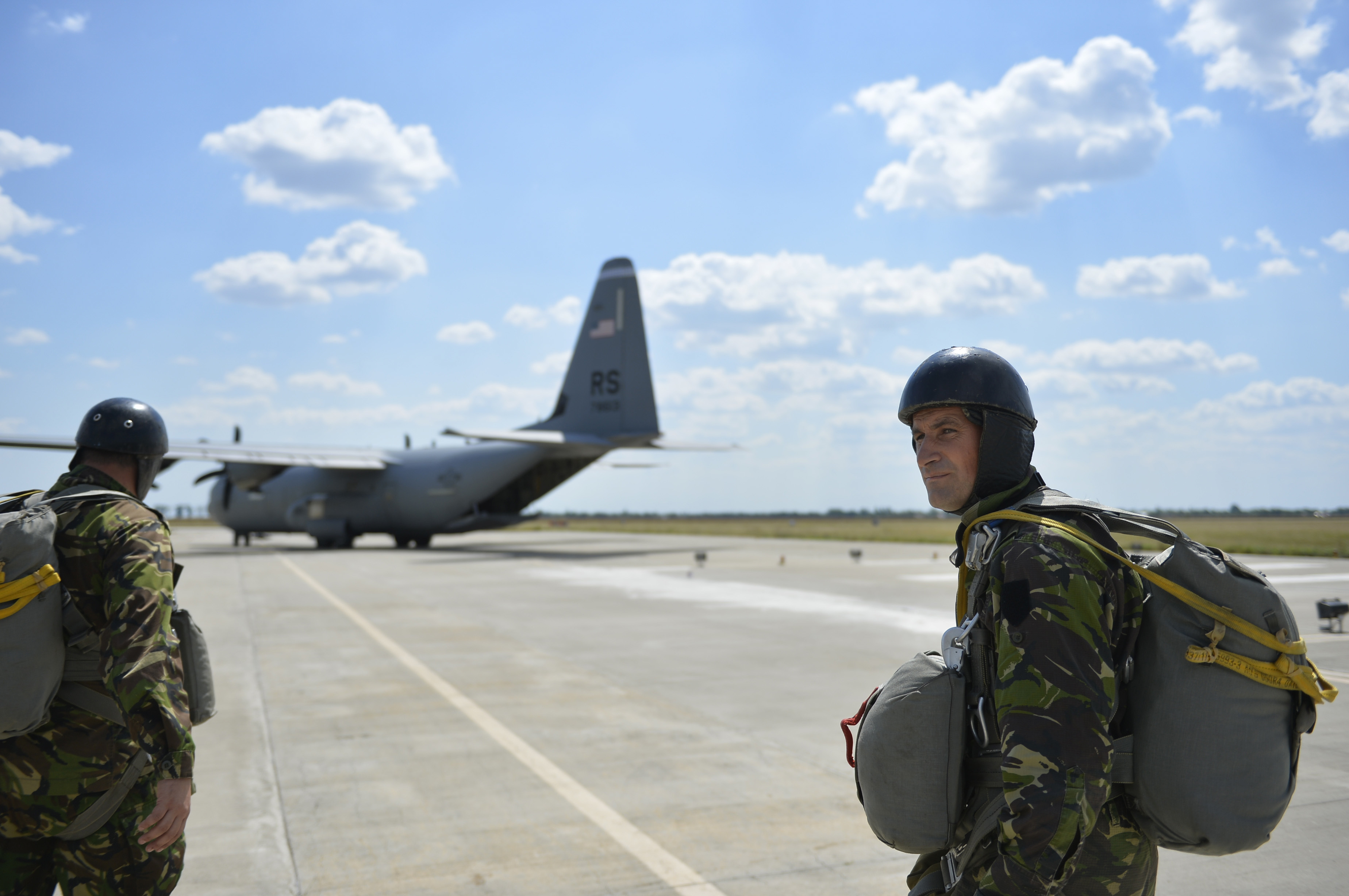
Romanian paratroopers prepare to board a C-130J Super Hercules during Carpathian Fall 2017 exercise.

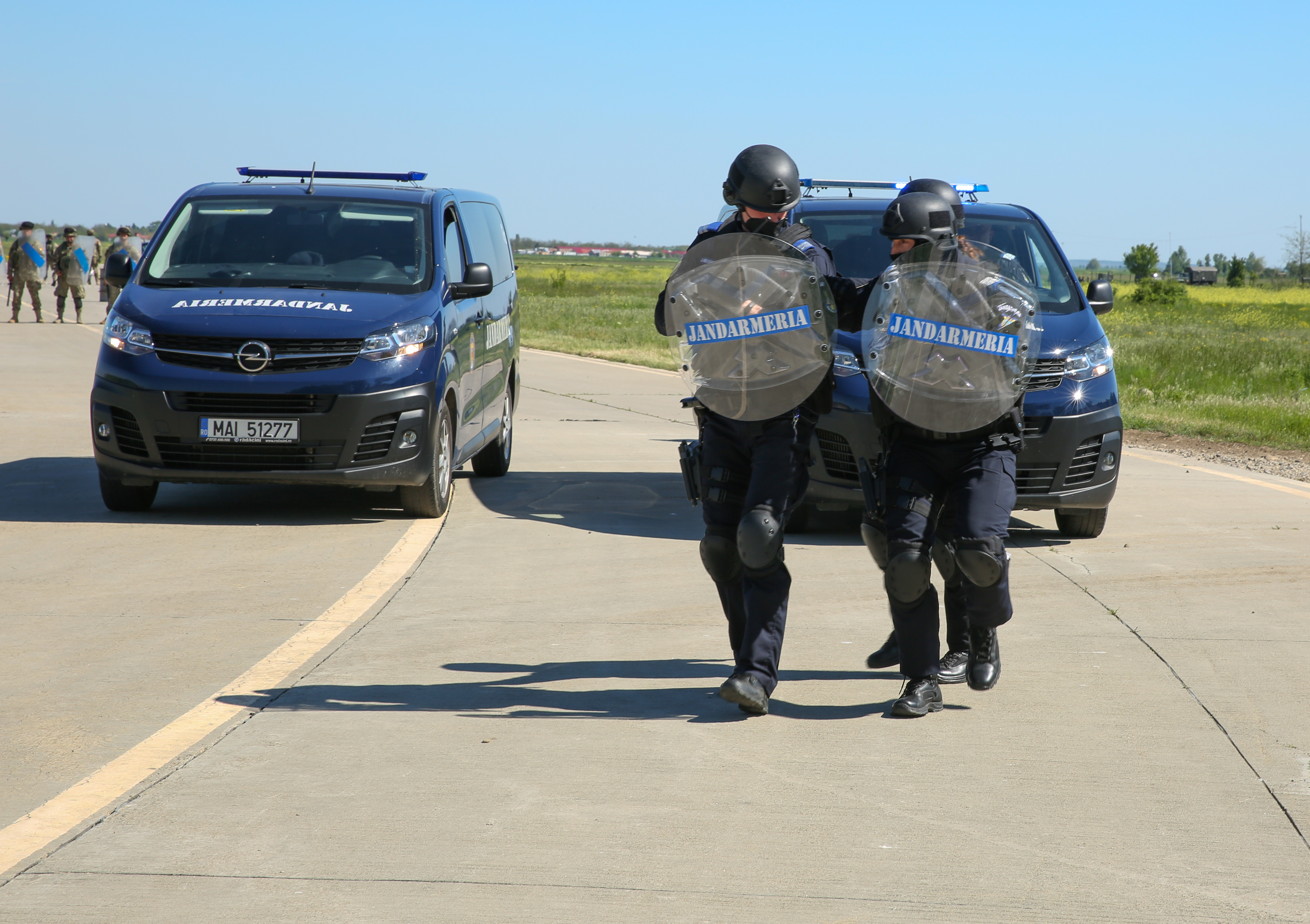
Romanian Gendarms during exercise Swift Response 21.

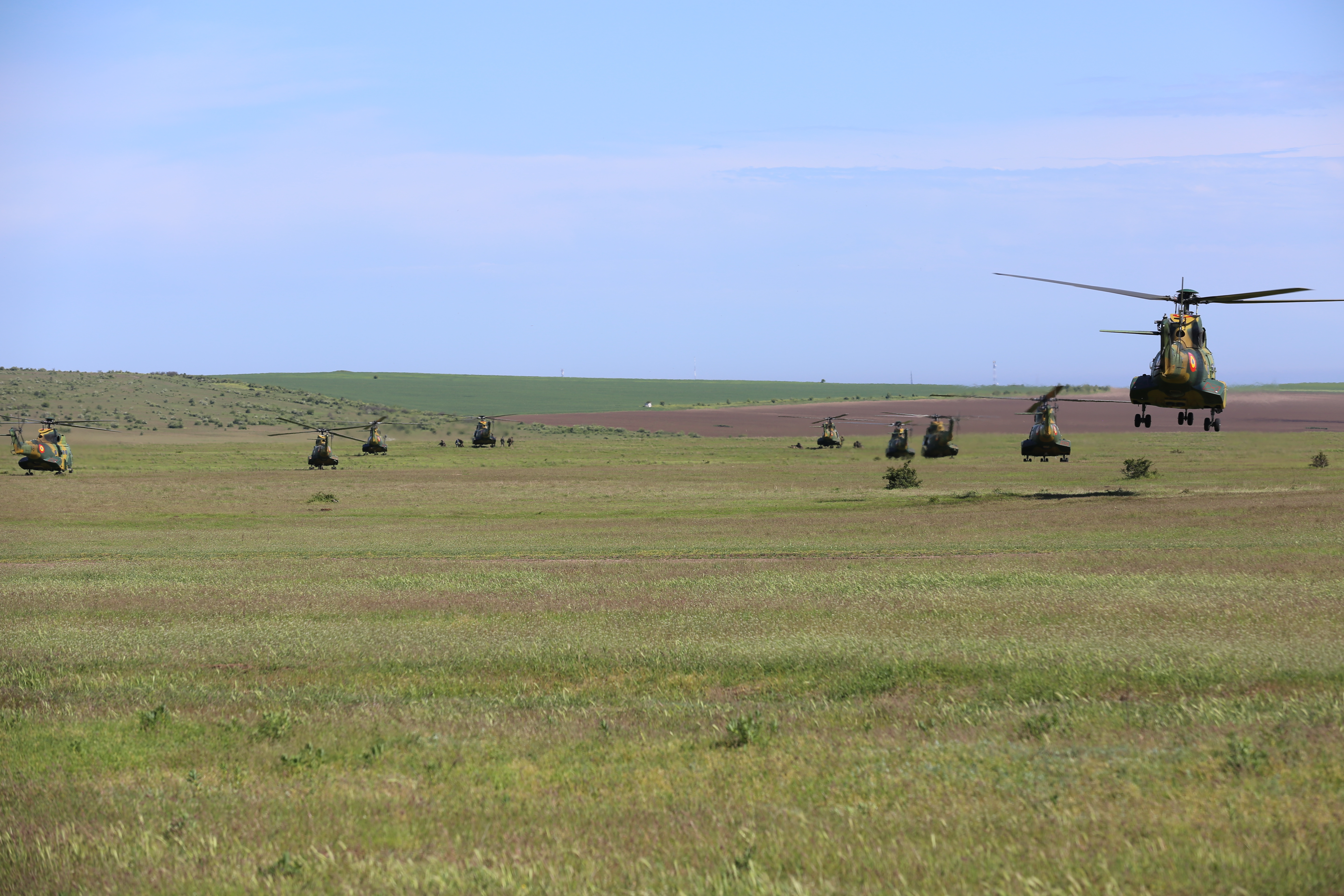
Romanian forces conducting Air Assault operations during Swift Response 21 in Boboc.

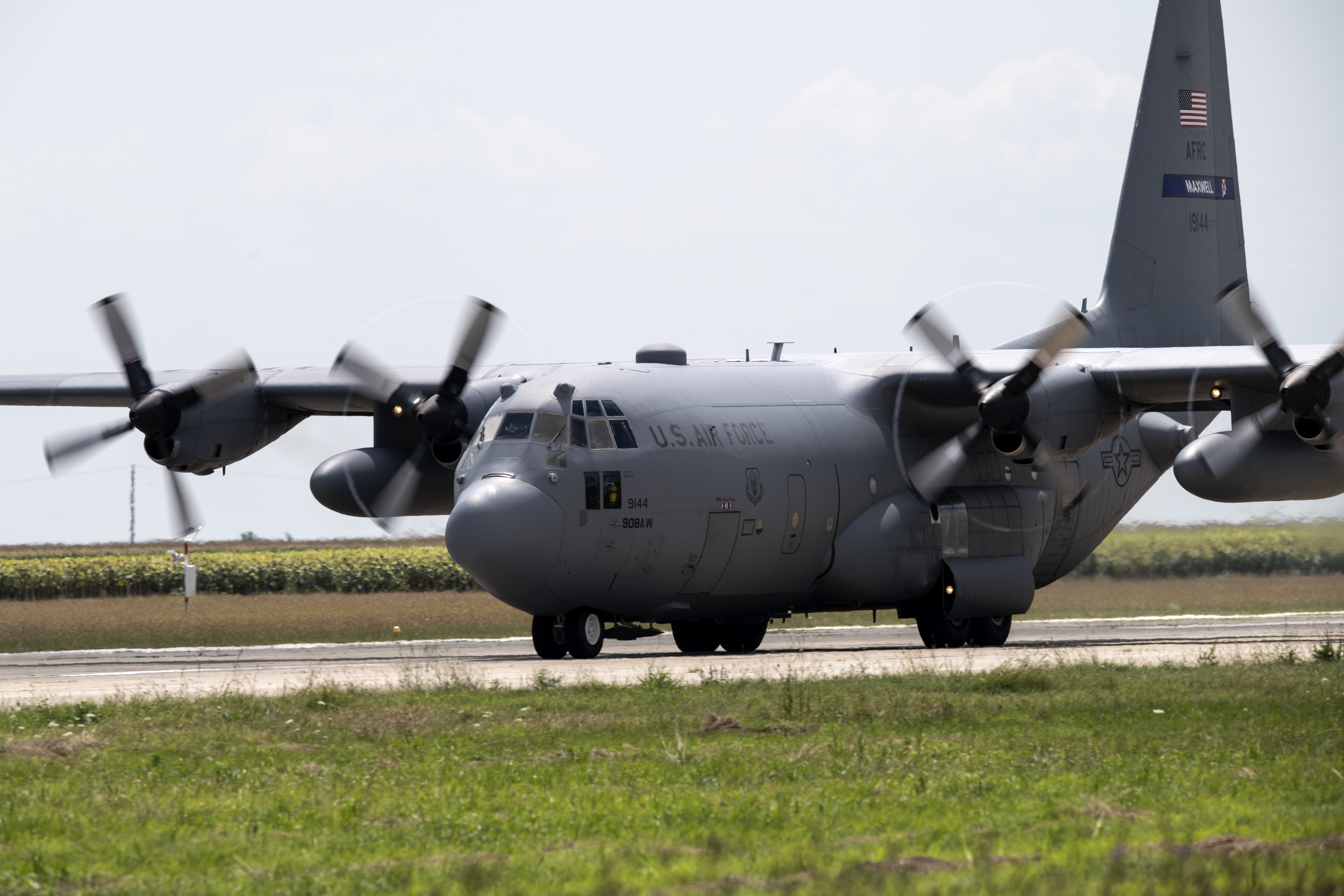
C-130H of the 908th Airlift Wing at Boboc Air Base in 2019.
