= Gara (given name) =

Gara is a given name.

- Gara Garayev (1918–1982), Azerbaijani composer
- Gara Garayev (footballer) (born 1992), Azerbaijani football defender
- Gara LaMarche (born 1954), an American politician
- Gara Takashima, Japanese voice actress

== Fictional characters ==
- Gaara, a character from the manga and anime series Naruto
- Gara, a character from the manga and anime series Dr. Slump.

== See also ==
- Gara (disambiguation)
- Gara (surname)
