= Top Management II =

1994 video game

- Super Famicom cover art
- Developer: Koei
- Publisher: Koei
- Series: Koei Executive Series
- Platforms: Super Famicom; Windows; NEC PC-9801
- Release: Super NES: JP: February 11, 1994
- Genres: Strategy w/ breeding and constructing elements
- Modes: Single-player, multiplayer

Top Management II (トップマネジメントII) is a multiplatform video game that emphasizes strategy and economic expansion.

== Gameplay ==
Before scheduling the next board meeting, the corporate executives are planning their big move.

Players must keep their corporation profitable by any means possible as a corporate executive. This entire video game is in Japanese, making it mandatory to be able to read the language. Frequent corporate meetings keep players aware of what is happening within the company. It is a sequel to Top Management for the Family Computer and NEC PC-9801. A typical game of Top Management begins in the year 1980.

The NEC PC-9801 version is a more complex version of the game; carrying complex information in addition to a business map of Japan and extra memory to chart the profit margin on a series of bars and graphs.

Starting in the first week of April, players must participate in strategic corporate meetings in order to guide the focus of the company into certain Japanese prefectures. Buying and selling is done on the Tokyo Stock Exchange in order to improve profits for the entire corporation. Employees can be hired, fired, or laid-off during these important meetings.
