= Korra Garra =

Korra Garra (or Kora Gara) is an Ethiopian writer, an expert in the Konso language and culture, and an authority on Konso agriculture. He is known for his presentations on the importance of the Moringa tree in the Konso economy and culture.

== Linguist and poet ==
Korra Garra has been involved in drafting spelling standards for the Konso language. Konso does not have a standard alphabet, although some Christian religious material has been published in the Fidäl script. Korra Garra has published two storybooks in the Latin script at Leiden University's department of African Languages and Cultures. One of these is Konso Water and Gods, or Torra Afaa Xonso (2003). Ato Kora Gara was one of the two representatives from Konso at the International Conference on Endangered Ethiopian/African Languages held in Addis Ababa on 27–30 April 2005, where he gave a poetry reading in Konso/Amharic.

== Agriculture ==
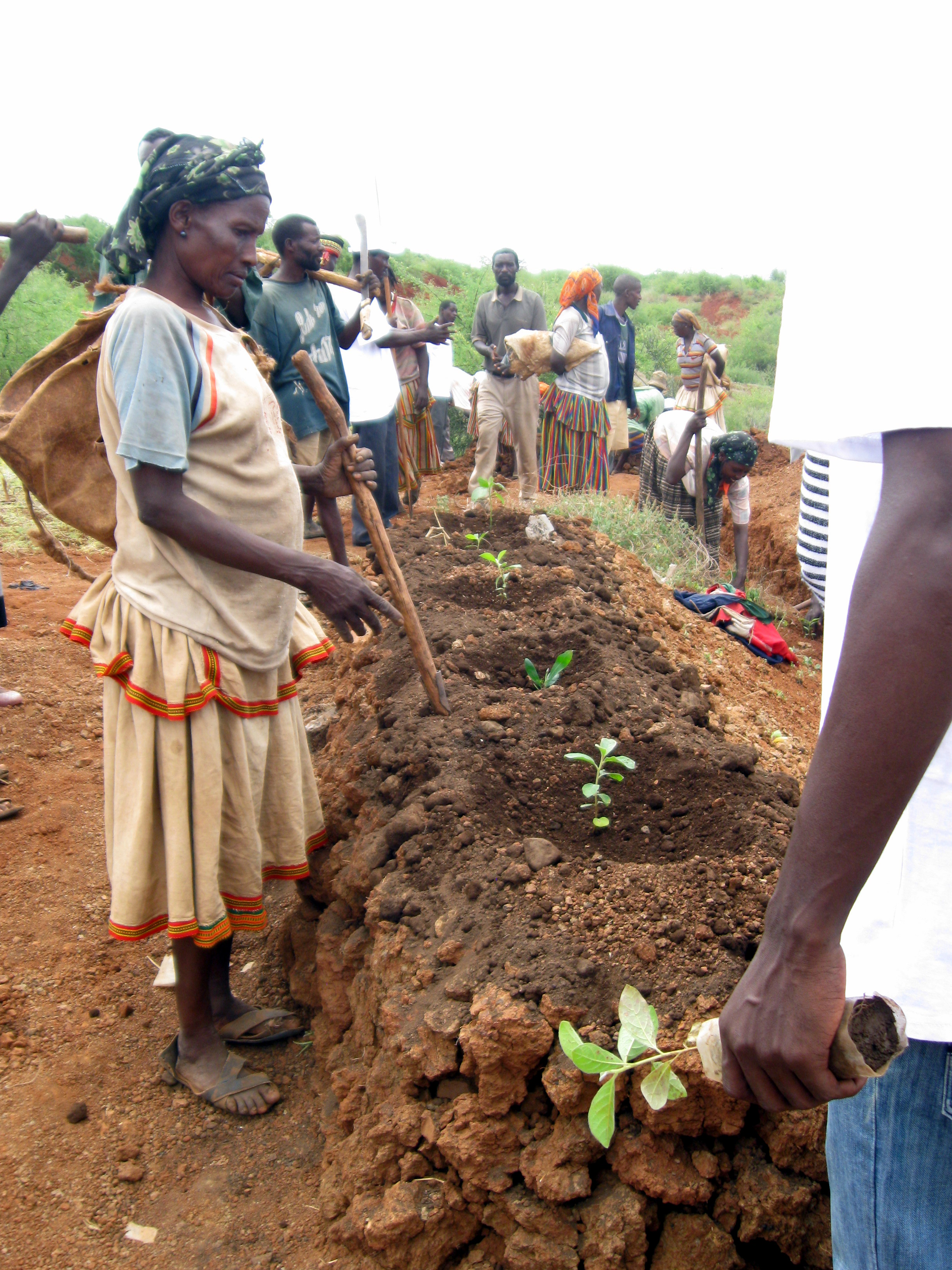
Planting Moringa stenopetala in Konso, 2012

Korra Garra is an official of the Ethiopian Ministry of Agriculture. In 2008 Korra Gara noted that 80% of the Konso economy was agricultural. The people practiced intercropping to reduce the risk of crop failure during drought. Population growth and declining rainfall due to deforestation are causing growing food insecurity. The leaves of the Moringa (cabbage tree) are an important part of the Konso diet. Korra Garra spoke in Turin in 21–25 October 2010 at the Mother Earth 2010 conference, where he discussed use of the Moringa stenopetala by the Konso peasants. The plant is of unusual importance to this community for food and medicine, and the Konso have many proverbs and myths related to the Moringa. He gave a talk on "What is Moringa stenopetala to Konso people?" at the Terracing & Moringa Conference held in December 2011 at the Italian Cultural Institute in Addis Ababa.

As of 2014 Korra Garra was running a community project "Plants and their Products" in Lower Dokattu, and gave talks to visitors on Konso culture, agriculture and the relation of the Konso people to the environment. As a Konso community elder he was appointed a member of the Moringa stenopetala Task Force in 2014.

== Publications ==
- Korra Garra. ለማስተዋል የቀረበ ግብዣ ግጥሞች ከኮንሶ - Invitation to Memory - Poems from Konso Land.
- Alemitu Abebe; Enrico Castelli (2003). Konso Music and Songs/Kirba afaa Xonso. Ethiopiques. Vol. 12. (CD) Translations from Xonso to English: Alemitu Abebe, Enrico Castelli, Korra Garra. Buda Musique 82252-2.
- Korra Garra (2003). Konso Water and Gods (Torra Afaa Xonso). Leiden University Department of African Languages and Cultures.
- Korra Garra, with the help of Maarten Mous (2004). "Rhyme in Konso poetry". Lassan. 18 (1): 56–67.
- Korra Garra (2011-12-14). "What is Moringa stenopetala to Konso people?". Proceedings of the 2nd Conference on Konso Cultural Landscape Terracing & Moringa. Italian Cultural Institute. Addis Ababa. p. 104. ISBN 9788859610526.
- Kora Garra (2014-05-23). "Indigenous use of Moringa stenopetala by the community of Konso and Hammer". Proceeding of Consultative Workshop on Moringa stenopetala to Maximize Its Potential Uses. p. 11.

== Sources ==
- "3 day trek". Strawberry Fields Eco-Lodge.
- Ashenif Tadele; Asfaw Debella (2014-05-23). "Proceeding of Consultative Workshop on Moringa stenopetala to Maximize Its Potential Uses" (PDF).
- Castelli, Enrico (2010-12-16). "Karat – Lunedì 13 dicembre 2010" (in Italian). Cooperazione Internationale Sud Sud.
- Demeulenaer, Élise (2002). "Le Moringa stenopetal est-il'arbe des Konso ?" (PDF). Patrimonialiser la Nature Tropicale: Dynamiques Locales, Enjeux Internationaux (in French). Paris. ISBN 2-7099-1496-4. Archived from the original (PDF) on 2014-10-16.
- Dixon, R. M. W.; Aikhenvald, Alexandra Y. (2009-08-06). The Semantics of Clause Linking: A Cross-Linguistic Typology. Oxford University Press. ISBN 978-0-19-160995-4.
- McCausland, Alex (2009-02-04). "Spotlight on Ethiopia". Permaculture Research Institute.
- Ongaye Oda Orkaydo (2003). "A Grammar of Konso" (PDF). Archived from the original (PDF) on 2014-10-19.
- Poissonnier, Nicole (2009). Das Erbe der "Helden": Grabkult der Konso und kulturverwandter Ethnien in Süd-Äthiopien (in German). Universitätsverlag Göttingen. ISBN 978-3-941875-03-6.
- "Report on the International Conference on Endangered Ethiopian/African Languages 27-30 April 2005, Addis Ababa, Ethiopia" (PDF). Leiden University. Archived from the original (PDF) on 2014-10-18.
- "Terracing & Moringa Conference". Konso Cultural Centre. 2011-12-02. Archived from the original on 2014-10-11.
- "Viaje solidario a Etiopia" (PDF) (in Italian). Tarannà Viajes con Sentido.
