= Sonom Gara =

Mongol Buddhist translator

Sonom Gara (fl. 13th century) was a Mongol Buddhist monk and translator. He was a Tantric priest. Sonom Gara is best known for translating, in the late 13th century, Sa-skya Pandita's Legs-bshad ("Elegant Sayings of Sakya Pandita"; "Aphorisms"). His version is not literal, but still faithful to the original. However, Sonom changed the sentence pattern and added and removed words; further, he reformulated the negative original message of the work into a positive one: "While the Tibetan says that wealth acquired by sin or violence is not genuine wealth, Sonom Gara states that only wealth acquired by knowledge is genuine."
