= La Garra (disambiguation) =

La Garra is the nickname of Jorge Luis Mendoza Cárdenas, a suspected Mexican drug lord

La Garra may also refer to:

- Argentina women's national handball team
- Mario Cuevas "La Garra", host of TeleHit, a Mexican TV network
