= Vlădila =

- Commune
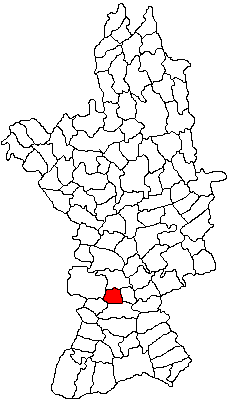
- Location in Olt County

- Location in Romania
- Coordinates: 44°0′N 24°24′E
- Country: Romania
- County: Olt
- Population (2021-12-01): 1,882
- Time zone: EET/EEST (UTC+2/+3)
- Vehicle reg.: OT

Vlădila is a commune in Olt County, Oltenia, Romania. It is composed of three villages: Frăsinet-Gară, Vlădila and Vlădila Nouă.
