= Vic Garra =

Australian rules footballer

Personal information
- Full name: Vic Garra
- Born: 27 September 1935 (age 91)
- Original team: University
- Height: 183 cm (6 ft 0 in)
- Weight: 82.5 kg (182 lb)

Playing career^{1}
Years	Club	Games (Goals)
1956–59	Carlton	22 (3)
- ^{1} Playing statistics correct to the end of 1959.

Vic Garra (born 27 September 1935) is a former Australian rules footballer who played with Carlton in the Victorian Football League (VFL).
