= Cochirleanca =

- Commune
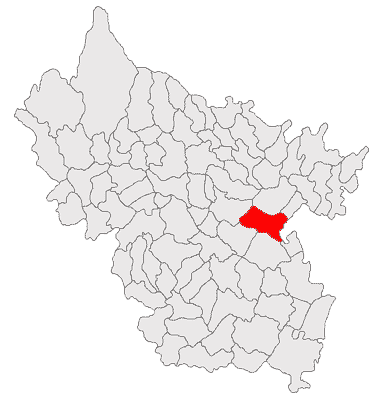
- Location in Buzău County

- Location in Romania
- Coordinates: 45°12′30″N 27°2′20″E
- Country: Romania
- County: Buzău
- Subdivisions: Boboc, Cochirleanca, Gara Bobocu, Roșioru, Târlele

Government
  - Mayor (2020–2024): Stancu Nicolae (PNL)
- Area: 69.64 km^{2} (26.89 sq mi)
- Elevation: 83 m (272 ft)
- Population (2021-12-01): 4,654
  - Density: 66.83/km^{2} (173.1/sq mi)
- Time zone: UTC+02:00 (EET)
  - Summer (DST): UTC+03:00 (EEST)
- Postal code: 127190
- Area code: +(40) 238
- Vehicle reg.: BZ
- Website: comunacochirleanca.ro

Cochirleanca is a commune in Buzău County, Muntenia, Romania. It is composed of five villages: Boboc, Cochirleanca, Gara Bobocu, Roșioru, and Târlele.

The Aurel Vlaicu Flight School is located in Boboc.

Historical population
Year	Pop.	±%
2002	5,805	—
2011	5,092	−12.3%
2021	4,654	−8.6%
Source: Census data

== Natives ==
- Dan Alexe (born 1961), writer and film director
