= Akaliza Keza Gara =

Rwandan IT activist and entrepreneur

- Born: Uganda
- Education: B.A., multimedia technology and design, University of Kent; Masters, Master of Information Systems, Kobe Institute of Computing
- Occupation: IT entrepreneur

Akaliza Keza Gara is a Rwandan IT activist and entrepreneur. She is active in promoting the field to girls and has been recognised for her activism by awards from the Rwandan government and the International Telecommunication Union. Gara has founded a technology consultancy and website design company and an animation studio. She has been described as "one of the few young Rwandan women who have made significant strides in changing the face of technology in the country" and is a member of the World Economic Forum’s Global Shapers Community.

== Career ==
Akaliza Keza Gara was born in Uganda and has lived at various times in South Africa, Kenya, the United States, France, Switzerland, and Italy. She has a bachelor's degree in multimedia technology and design from the University of Kent, Canterbury (UK). She settled in Kigali, Rwanda after completing her degree and won her first job in 2009 by competitive tender to design a website for the government's Public Sector Capacity Building Secretariat. She was 23 years old and had to borrow a laptop from the client to complete the work. Gara founded the multimedia business Shaking Sun to allow her to win more work in the fields of graphic design, website design and animation and to train young Rwandans. The company has designed websites for the Rwandan Ministry of Finance and Economic Planning and the Ministry of Natural Resources.

Since September 2012 Gara has worked as a mentor at kLab, an organisation to provide technology support and mentoring to people in Kigali and also works with Girls in ICT Rwanda, which brings together women working in information & communications technology professionals to promote the field as a career to girls. She is a member of the Kigali hub of the World Economic Forum’s Global Shapers Community. In 2012 Gara was awarded the Outstanding Woman Entrepreneur in ICT award by the Rwanda Ministry of Youth and ICT. In the same year she was one of four Rwandan women ICT entrepreneurs recognised as outstanding in their field by the International Telecommunication Union. She pioneered the use of the "Rwandans on Twitter" (#RwOT) hashtag.

In 2013 Microsoft appointed Gara as a youth representative for East Africa, the first time a Rwandan had been appointed to that position, and she was one of four members of the youth advisory council to the corporation's 4Afrika initiative.

Gara also founded the Yambi Animation Studios. She is developing the African Tales animation, which will be the first cartoon series for children produced in Rwanda. Gara made her first cartoon project in 2014, an educational series for children, and hopes to develop characters and settings that Rwandan children can relate to.

In 2018, Gara was appointed by the United Nations secretary-general António Guterres to be on the Digital Cooperation High Level Panel. Of the panel, the secretary-general stated, “Digital technologies make a significant contribution to the realisation of the Sustainable Development Goals and they cut uniquely across international boundaries. Therefore, cooperation across domains and across borders is critical to realizing the full social and economic potential of digital technologies as well as mitigating the risks that they pose and curtailing any unintended consequences.”

Gara has been described as "one of the few young Rwandan women who have made significant strides in changing the face of technology in the country". She has taken part in the Peace Through Business and the Academy for Leadership in Competitiveness and Prosperity courses and as of 2017 has completed a Master of Science degree in information technology from the Kobe Institute of Computing.

== Honors ==
Honors received by Akaliza Keza Gara include:

- Honorary Doctorate from University of Kent
- Member of the Microsoft 4Afrika Advisory Board
- Member of the UN Secretary General Panel on Digital Cooperation
