= Tomio Fukuoka =

Japanese educator

- 福岡富雄
- Born: January 1, 1936 (age 90); Kagawa Prefecture, Japan
- Occupations: Educator, Academian
- Known for: Founder of Kobe Institute of Computing (KIC)
- Title: Graduate School of Information Technology (KIC) - Founder and Chairman; Kobe Denshi- Founder and Chairman
- Spouse: Kazuko Fukuoka
- Children: 2
- Awards: Medal with Blue Ribbon(1993); Order of the Sacred Treasure (2008)

Tomio Fukuoka (福岡富雄) (born January 1, 1936) is a Japanese educator and Academian. He is the Founder/Chairman of Kobe Denshi and Graduate School of Information Technology (KIC).

== Early life ==
Tomio Fukuoka was born in Kagawa Prefecture, Japan.

== Professional career ==
Tomio Fukuoka founded KIC in 1958 as a small Electronic school in the city of Kobe, Japan was called Kobe Electronic School, which received the recognition Institute of Advanced Vocational Education from the Japanese Ministry of Education in 1988 for its vital contribution to Japanese computing society. Now KIC is one of the major institutes for professional, vocational, practical oriented education in ICT and other Digital related industries in Japan over 17,700 alumni.

== Awards and honors ==
- Medal with Blue Ribbon

Awarded for significant achievements in the areas of public welfare and public service by the Government of Japan in 1993.

- Order of the Sacred Treasure (GOLD AND SILVER RAYS)

Awarded for distinguished achievements in research fields, social work, state/local government fields or the improvement of life for handicapped/impaired persons by the Emperor of Japan in 2008.

== Publication ==
- 『AI基礎原理とその仕組み』 (in Japanese). KIC Planning and Publishing Department(Kobe Denshi／Kobe Institute of Computing). 12 March 2021. ISBN 978-4-87787-800-9. C3055

== See also ==
- Kobe Institute of Computing
- Kobe Denshi
