= Kobe Institute of Computing =

Private university in Kobe, Hyōgo, Japan

Coordinates: 34°41′56.3″N 135°11′35.6″E

Kobe Institute of Computing (KIC) - Graduate School of Information Technology
- 神戸情報大学院大学
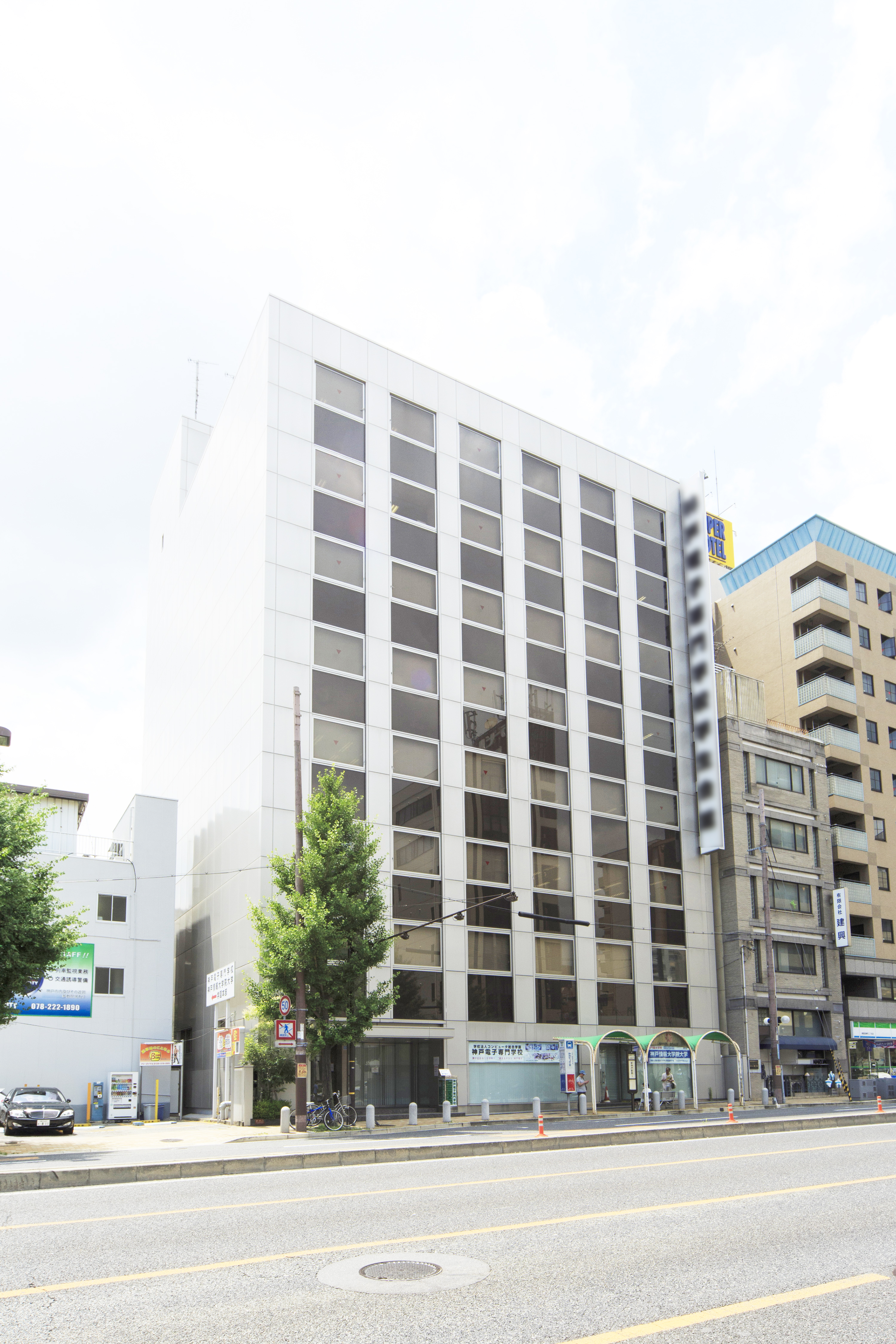
- Motto: Social Innovation by ICT and yourself
- Type: Private
- Established: 2005; 21 years ago Hyogo, Kobe
- Founder: Tomio Fukuoka
- President: Toshiki Sumitani
- Vice-president: Tomoyuki Naito
- Postgraduates: Master of Information Systems
- Location: 2-2-7 Kano-cho, Kobe Chuo-ku,, Kobe, Hyogo Prefecture, Japan
- Campus: Urban
- Website: www.kic.ac.jp/eng/

Kobe Institute of Computing; Graduate School of Information Technology (神戸情報大学院大学, Kōbe jōhō daigakuin daigaku) is a private university in Kobe, Hyogo Prefecture, Japan.

== History ==
KIC was found by Mr Tomio Fukuoka in 1958; 68 years ago. The Graduate School of Information Technology was established in April 2005; 21 years ago.

== Fields of study ==
KIC Graduate School of Information Technology has one Masters course called "Department of Information Systems" which has two courses: ICT Professional Course and ICT Innovator Course.

=== Course term / degree ===
- Normal course term: two years
- Degree: Master of Information Systems

== Recognition ==
KIC ranked #1 among 530 Japanese private universities in terms of the sustainability index, composed of growth of number of students, growth of government research grant, and financial soundness.

KIC has been awarded JICA President Award 2019 to commend the individuals and organizations with preeminent achievements of the socio-economic development in developing countries through Japan International Cooperation Agency's (JICA) international cooperation activities.

== Adopted projects ==
The ICT Innovator Program has been adopted for the promotion of internationalization of universities by the Ministry of Education, Culture, Sports, Science and Technology, and for the project to support human resource development and economic growth of programs in developing countries by the Japan International Cooperation Agency (JICA).

- Industrial human resource development initiative for young people of Africa (ABE initiative)
- The Project for Human Resource Development Scholarship by Japanese Grant Aid (JDS)
- Grass Roots Project
- Afghanistan “Project for the Promotion and Enhancement of the Afghan Capacity for Effective Development” (PEACE Project)
- Pacific Leaders’ Educational Assistance for Development of State (Pacific-LEADS)
- In 2018 Kobe Institute of Computing ventured with Swift Engineering (an American engineering firm, most notable for producing racing cars for a variety of open-wheel racing series, including Formula Ford, Formula Atlantic, the Champ Car World Series and Formula Nippon. From 2000 it diversified into Aerospace/Aviation markets) called Swift Xi located in Kobe, Japan.

== Academic agreements ==
KIC partners with institutions around the world to give further chances for the students to develop their skills and international cooperation through programs selected by the Japanese government.

- Advanced Institute of Industrial Technology, Japan
- Autonomous University of Bucaramanga, Colombia
- Budapest University of Technology and Economics, Hungary
- Cheng Shiu University, Taiwan
- Edith Cowan University, Australia
- Integrated Polytechnic Regional College Tumba (IPRC TUMBA), Rwanda
- Northeastern University (China), China
- Sabancı University, Turkey
- Technical University of Cologne, Germany
- University of Dhaka, Department of Electrical and Electronic Engineering, Bangladesh
- University of Hyogo Graduate School of Applied Informatics, Japan
- University of Rwanda, Rwanda
- Vietnam National University, Vietnam

== Notable alumni ==
- Akaliza Keza Gara - Rwandan IT activist and entrepreneur

== See also ==
- Colleges of technology in Japan
- Institute of technology
- Education in Japan
- Swift Xi
