= Maru River (Wainganga basin) =

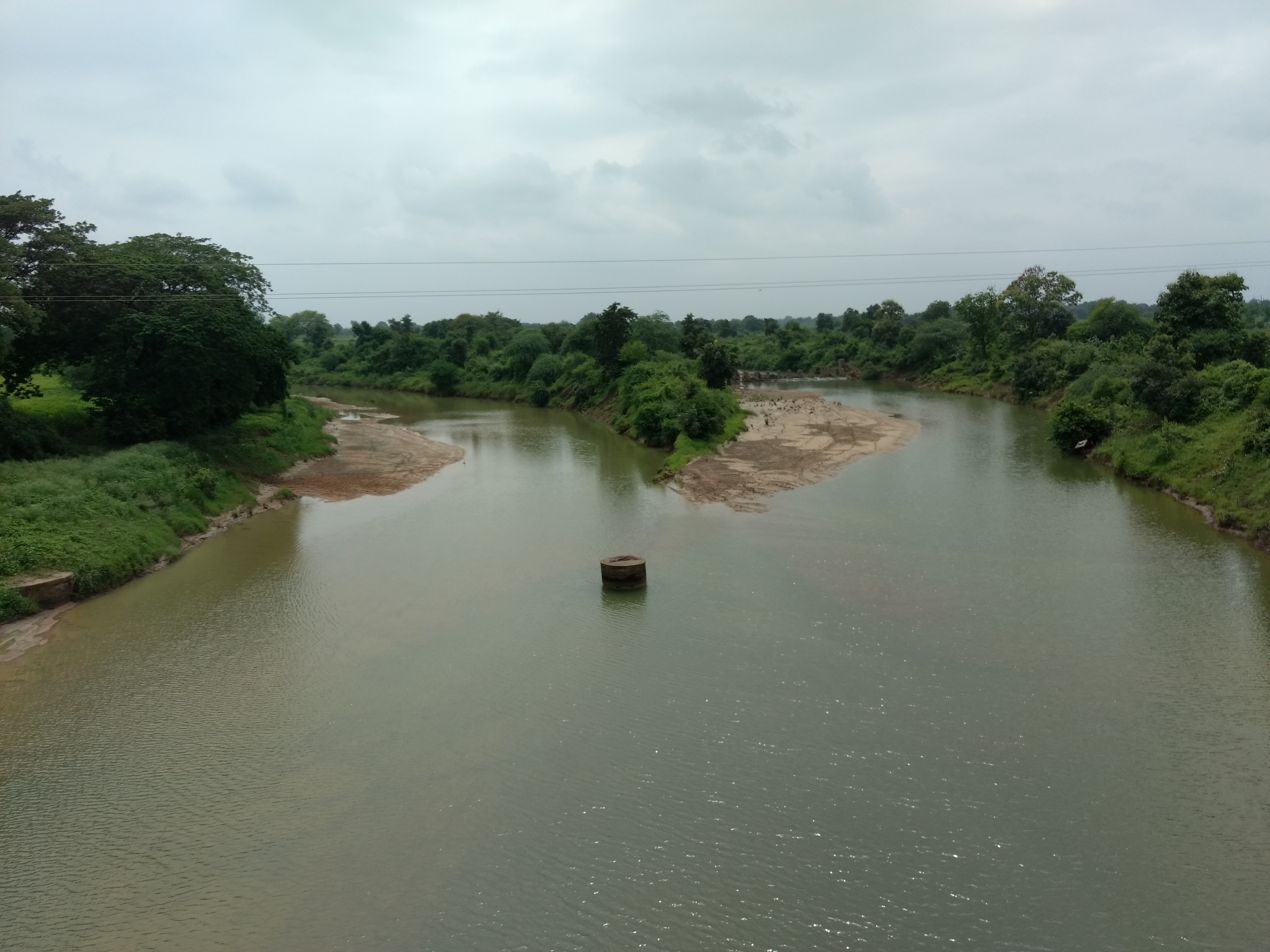
- Maru river near Bhiwapur
- Native name: मारू नदी (Marathi)

Location
- Country: India
- State: Maharashtra
- Region: Vidarbha
- District: Nagpur

Physical characteristics
- Source
  - coordinates: 20°42′44″N 79°19′48″E
- Mouth: Gose Khurd Dam
  - location: Marupar
  - coordinates: 20°53′8″N 79°33′17″E

Maru river (Marathi: मारू नदी) is a minor river of eastern Vidarbha flowing through Nagpur and Bhandara districts. It flows near Bhiwapur forming a boundary between Nagpur and Bhandara districts for a short distance. Further, it flows to the east of Umred Karhandla Wildlife Sanctuary and discharges itself into Gose Khurd Dam on Wainganga river. Maru is a seasonal river running dry in hot seasons, but flows good during monsoon.

It is said that alluvial gold mining is practiced in the basin of Maru river by the locals of Bhiwapur.
