= Ghodazari Wildlife Sanctuary =

- IUCN category IV (habitat/species management area)
- Interactive map of Ghodazari Wildlife Sanctuary
- Location: Chandrapur district, Maharashtra, India
- Area: 159 km^{2} (61 sq mi)
- Established: 2018

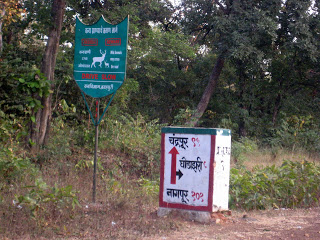

Ghodazari Wildlife Sanctuary is a wildlife reserve established in 2018 in Nagbhir, in the Chandrapur district of the Vidarbha region in Maharashtra, India. It includes 159 km^{2} (61 mi^{2}) of southern tropical dry forest and a lake. The forest is considered a key region on the connecting corridor for the tiger migration between the Tadoba Andhari Tiger Project and the Umred Karhandala Wildlife Sanctuary. It is named after a village of the same name, which is almost in the middle of the forest, about 2 km from the dam and the resort. In Marathi, ghoda means horse, and zari means a place with a water spring.

== Sanctuary ==
Tigers are the main attraction and the reason for the creation of the sanctuary. Census records show there are at least 12 tigers in the region, but because the sanctuary is on the tiger migration pathway, tigers from the Tadoba and Umred Karhandala sanctuaries have been seen and recorded in tiger research in this region. The sanctuary is also home to other wild mammals such as Indian leopards, sloth bears, gaur, dhole, nilgai, small Indian civet, jungle cats, sambar, barking deer, chital, and wild boar.

Ghodazari lake is an important destination for the native and migratory birds due to its undisturbed water body and abundance of food. Numerous reptiles have been recorded there, including the Indian python, common Indian monitor, Indian cobra and Russell's viper.

The Ghodazari Wildlife Sanctuary consists mainly of deciduous forest which has an extensive distribution of teak, palas, ain, bija, hald, salai, semal, tendu, beheda, hirda, karaya gum, mahua and Bamboo trees.

== Human–wildlife conflict ==
The Chandrapur area faces issues with human–wildlife conflict due to the presence of tigers near villages. In 2017, 21 tiger deaths were recorded in Maharashtra, the highest number recorded there in ten years. Some of these deaths may have been related to poaching, and some were due to tigers coming into contact with electric fences erected by farmers. A study by the NGO Wildlife Protection Survey of India, there were 84 tiger deaths in Maharashtra from 2010 to 2017, and 25 of them were due to poaching.

Humans are sometimes the victims of this conflict in this area as well. Between 2006 and 2010, up to 61 people in the Chandrapur district were killed by tigers.
