= Rupiamma =

Rupiamma
Great Satrap

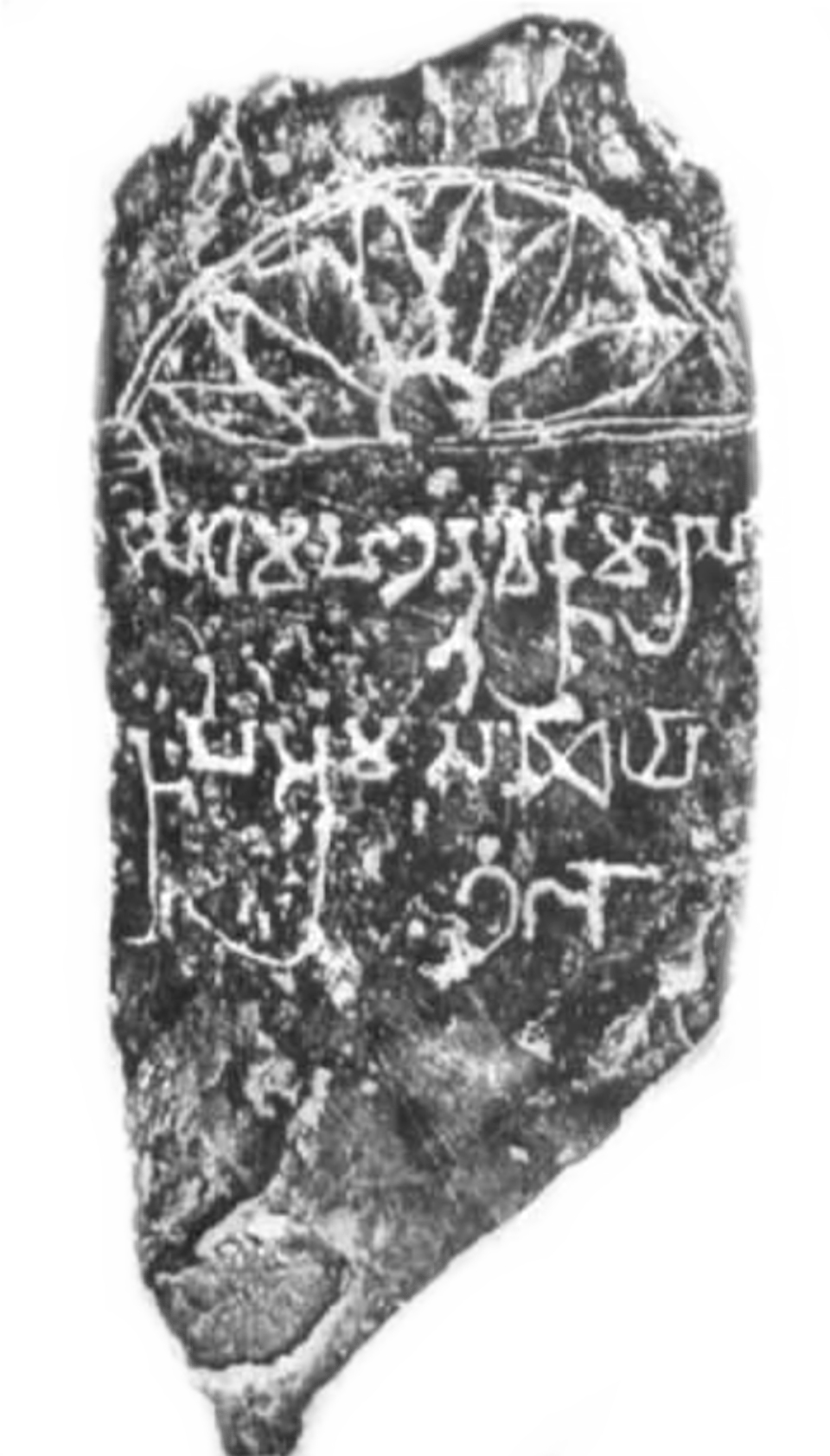
Mahakshatrapa Rupiamma pillar inscription, Pauni.

Location of Pauni in India.

Rupiamma was a Great Satrap in India during the 2nd century CE, who is known from an inscription found at Pauni in Central India, south of the Narmada River.

== Pillar inscription ==
A memorial pillar with an inscription in the name of "Mahakshatrapa Kumara Rupiamma" has been recovered in Pauni, and is dated to the 2nd century CE. Rupiamma is probably related to the Saka Western Satraps. This memorial pillar is thought to mark the southern extent of the conquests of the Western Satraps, much beyond the traditionally held boundary of the Narmada River. The use of the word "Kumara" may also mean that Rupiamma was the son of a Great Satrap, rather than holding the title himself.

The Middle Brahmi inscription reads:

𑀲𑀺𑀥𑀁 𑀫𑀳𑀔𑀢𑁆𑀢𑀯 𑀓𑀼𑀫𑀭𑀲 𑀭𑀼𑀧𑀺𑀅𑀁𑀫𑀲 𑀙𑀬𑀸 𑀔𑀁𑀪𑁄
Sidhaṃ Mahakhattava Kumarasa Rupiaṃmasa chayā Khambo
"Sculpted pillar of Lord Prince and Great Satrap Rupiamma"

— Rupiamma inscription, 2nd century CE

== Coinage ==
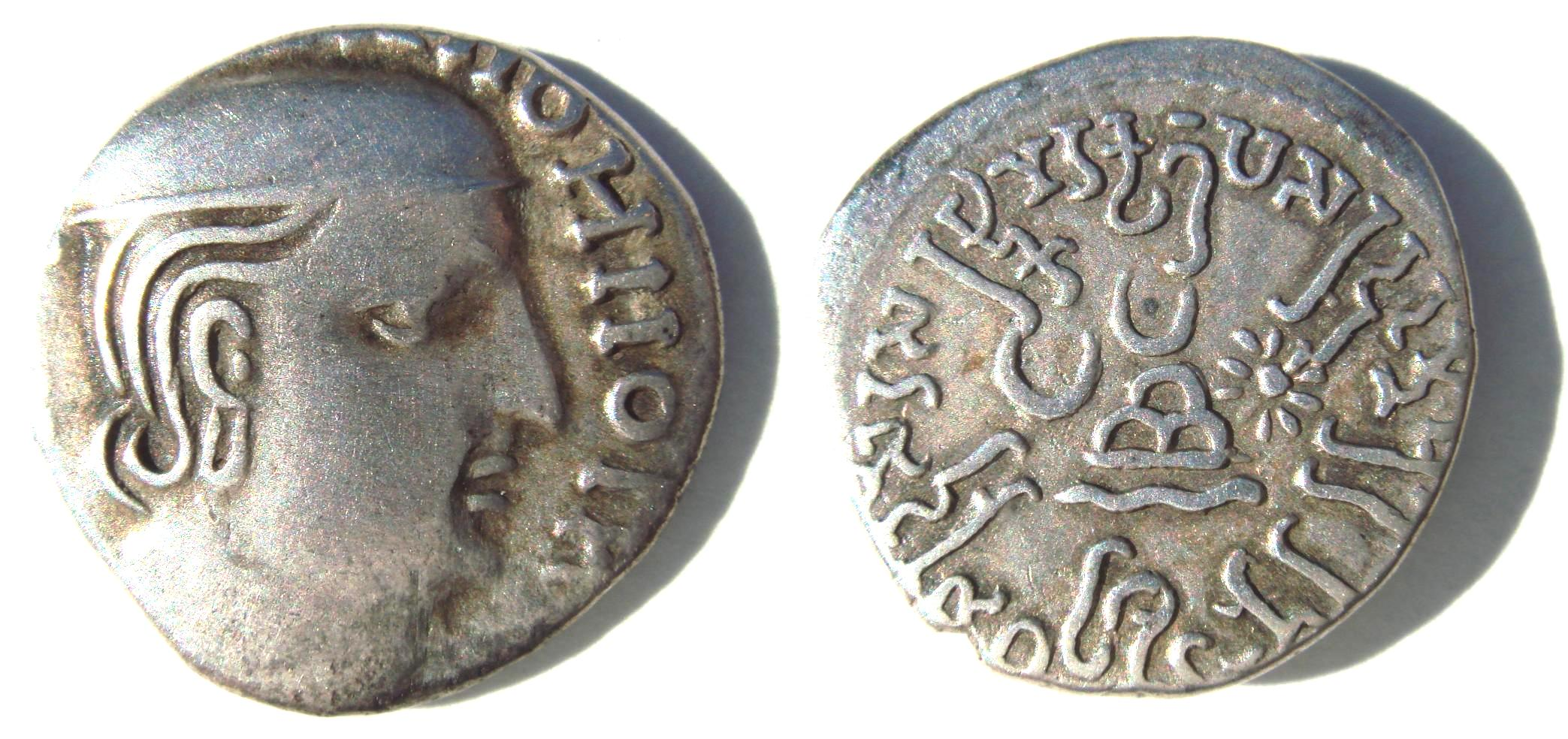
Coins and pillar inscriptions of the Western Satraps were found in Pauni.

There are no coins of Rupiamma known, but coins belonging to the Western Satraps (Rudrasimha) were also discovered in the ruins of Buddhist stupas at Pauni.

A few dozen donative inscriptions in the Brahmi script have been found at the site of Pauni, in a style similar to the inscriptions of Bharhut and Sanchi.

== Kushan or Western Satrap? ==
It is not known is Rupiamma, as a "Great Satrap", should be understood as a representative of the Kushan Empire, or as one of the Western Satraps, whose own political relationship with the Kushan is not clearly known. If Rupiamma belonged to the Kushan hierarchy, this would suggest that Kushan control extended this far south, beyond the generally accepted southern boundary formed by the Narmada River. According to the recently discovered Rabatak inscription, Kushan dominions expanded into the heartland of northern India in the early 2nd century CE. Lines 4 to 7 of the inscription describe the cities which were under the rule of Kanishka, among which six names are identifiable: Ujjain, Kundina, Saketa, Kausambi, Pataliputra, and Champa (although the text is not clear whether Champa was a possession of Kanishka or just beyond it).

== Sources ==
- Rezakhani, Khodadad (2017b). "From the Kushans to the Western Turks". In Daryaee, Touraj (ed.). King of the Seven Climes: A History of the Ancient Iranian World (3000 BCE - 651 CE). UCI Jordan Center for Persian Studies. pp. 1–236. ISBN 9780692864401.

Territories/ dates	Western India	Western Pakistan Balochistan	Paropamisadae Arachosia	Bajaur	Gandhara	Western Punjab	Eastern Punjab	Mathura
			INDO-GREEK KINGDOM					
90–85 BCE			Nicias	Menander II		Artemidoros		
90–70 BCE			Hermaeus	Archebius				
85-60 BCE			INDO-SCYTHIAN KINGDOM; Maues					
75–70 BCE			Vonones; Spalahores	Telephos		Apollodotus II		
65–55 BCE			Spalirises; Spalagadames			Hippostratos	Dionysios	
55–35 BCE			Azes I				Zoilos II	
55–35 BCE			Azilises; Azes II				Apollophanes	Indo-Scythian dynasty of the NORTHERN SATRAPS; Hagamasha
25 BCE – 10 CE				Indo-Scythian dynasty of the APRACHARAJAS; Vijayamitra (ruled 12 BCE - 15 CE) (Note: From the dated inscription on the Rukhana reliquary)	Liaka Kusulaka; Patika Kusulaka; Zeionises	Kharahostes (ruled 10 BCE– 10 CE) (Note: An Inscribed Silver Buddhist Reliquary of the Time of King Kharaosta and Prince Indravarman, Richard Salomon, Journal of the American Oriental Society, Vol. 116, No. 3 (Jul. - Sep., 1996), pp. 442); Mujatria	Strato II and Strato III	Hagana
10-20 CE		INDO-PARTHIAN KINGDOM; Gondophares		Indravasu	INDO-PARTHIAN KINGDOM; Gondophares		Rajuvula	
20-30 CE			Ubouzanes; Pakores	Vispavarma (ruled c.0-20 CE) (Note: A Kharosthī Reliquary Inscription of the Time of the Apraca Prince Visnuvarma, by Richard Salomon, South Asian Studies 11 1995, Pages 27-32, Published online: 09 Aug 2010)	Sarpedones		Bhadayasa	Sodasa
30-40 CE			KUSHAN EMPIRE; Kujula Kadphises	Indravarma	Abdagases		...	...
40-45 CE				Aspavarma	Gadana		...	...
45-50 CE				Sasan	Sases		...	...
50-75 CE							...	...
75-100 CE	Indo-Scythian dynasty of the WESTERN SATRAPS; Chastana		Vima Takto				...	...
100-120 CE	Abhiraka		Vima Kadphises				...	...
120 CE	Bhumaka; Nahapana	PARATARAJAS; Yolamira	Kanishka I				Great Satrap Kharapallana and Satrap Vanaspara for Kanishka I	
130-230 CE	Jayadaman; Rudradaman I Damajadasri I Jivadaman; Rudrasimha I Satyadaman; Jivadaman; Rudrasena I	Bagamira; Arjuna; Hvaramira; Mirahvara	Vāsishka (c. 140 – c. 160); Huvishka (c. 160 – c. 190); Vasudeva I (c. 190 – to at least 230)					
230-280 CE	Samghadaman; Damasena; Damajadasri II; Viradaman; Isvaradatta; Yasodaman I Vijayasena; Damajadasri III; Rudrasena II; Visvasimha	Miratakhma; Kozana; Bhimarjuna; Koziya; Datarvharna; Datarvharna	INDO-SASANIANS; Ardashir I, Sassanid king and "Kushanshah" (c. 230 – 250); Peroz I, "Kushanshah" (c. 250 – 265); Hormizd I, "Kushanshah" (c. 265 – 295)			Kanishka II (c. 230 – 240); Vashishka (c. 240 – 250); Kanishka III (c. 250 – 275)		
280-300 CE	Bhratadarman	Datayola II	Hormizd II, "Kushanshah" (c. 295 – 300)			Vasudeva II (c. 275 – 310)		
300-320 CE	Visvasena; Rudrasimha II; Jivadaman		Peroz II, "Kushanshah" (c. 300 – 325)			Vasudeva III; Vasudeva IV; Vasudeva V Chhu (c. 310? – 325)		
320-388 CE	Yasodaman II; Rudradaman II; Rudrasena III; Simhasena; Rudrasena IV		Shapur II Sassanid king and "Kushanshah" (c. 325); Varhran I, Varhran II, Varhran III "Kushanshahs" (c. 325 – 350); Peroz III "Kushanshah" (c. 350 –360); HEPHTHALITE/ HUNAS invasions			Shaka I (c. 325 – 345); Kipunada (c. 345 – 375)		GUPTA EMPIRE; Chandragupta I Samudragupta
388-395 CE	Rudrasimha III		Chandragupta II					
