= Bhuyar railway station =

Railway Station in Maharashtra, India

General information
- Location: Bhuyar, Bhandara district, Maharashtra; India
- Coordinates: 20.7045983°N 79.5783324°E
- Elevation: 263 metres (863 ft)
- System: Indian Railways station
- Owner: Indian Railways
- Operator: South East Central Railway zone
- Lines: Nagpur–Nagbhir NG branch line Bilaspur–Nagpur section Howrah–Nagpur–Mumbai line
- Platforms: 1
- Tracks: Broad gauge 1,676 mm (5 ft 6 in)

Construction
- Structure type: At ground
- Parking: Available
- Cycle facilities: Available

Other information
- Status: Functioning
- Station code: BHRH
- Zone(s): South East Central Railway zone
- Division(s): Nagpur SEC

Services
Preceding station	Indian Railways	Following station
Pauni Road towards ?	South East Central Railway zone Nagpur–Nagbhir NG Branch Line on Bilaspur–Nagpur section of Howrah–Nagpur–Mumbai line	Tempa towards ?
Location
- Location within India Location within Maharashtra

Bhuyar Railway Station Or Bhuyar Halt serves Bhuyar and surrounding villages in Bhandara District in Maharashtra, India.
