= Pauni Road railway station =

Railway station in Maharashtra, India

Pauni Road

General information
- Location: Nilaj, Bhandara district, Maharashtra; India
- Coordinates: 20.7476763°N 79.5519113°E
- Elevation: 262 metres (860 ft)
- System: Indian Railways station
- Owner: Indian Railways
- Operator: South East Central Railway zone
- Lines: Nagpur–Nagbhir NG branch line Bilaspur–Nagpur section
- Platforms: 1
- Tracks: Narrow gauge

Construction
- Structure type: At ground
- Parking: Available
- Cycle facilities: Available

Other information
- Status: Functioning
- Station code: PNRD
- Zone(s): South East Central Railway zone
- Division(s): Nagpur SEC

Services
Preceding station	Indian Railways	Following station
Bhiwapur towards ?	South East Central Railway zone Nagpur–Nagbhir NG branch line on Bilaspur–Nagpur section of Howrah–Nagpur–Mumbai line	Bhuyar towards ?
Location
- Location within India Location within Maharashtra

Pauni Road railway station serves Pauni city and surrounding villages in Bhandara district in Maharashtra, India.
