= Pauni =

- Town
- Nickname: Kashi of Vidarbha
- Location in Maharashtra, India Pauni (India)
- Coordinates: 20.78°N 79.63°E
- Country: India
- State: Maharashtra
- District: Bhandara

Government
  - Type: Municipal Council

Area
  - Total: 9 km^{2} (3.5 sq mi)
- Elevation: 226 m (741 ft)

Population (2011)
  - Total: 22,821
  - Density: 2,500/km^{2} (6,600/sq mi)

Languages
  - Official: Marathi
- Time zone: UTC+5:30 (IST)
- PIN: 441910
- Vehicle registration: MH-36
- Nearest Railway Station: Pauni Road

Pauni is a town and a Municipal Council in Bhandara district in Maharashtra. Now it has National Highway 247. Pauni is also known as Kashi of Vidarbha due to its wide swath of temples.

== Geography ==
Pauni is located at 20.78°N 79.63°E. It has an average elevation of 226 metres (741 feet). The town is surrounded on three sides by a moat and earthen rampart, and the fourth side by the Wainganga River. The main language of Pauni is Marathi, the regional language of the state of Maharashtra. Pauni is surrounded by Umred Pauni Karhandla Wildlife Sanctuary, famous for tigers and other wild animals.

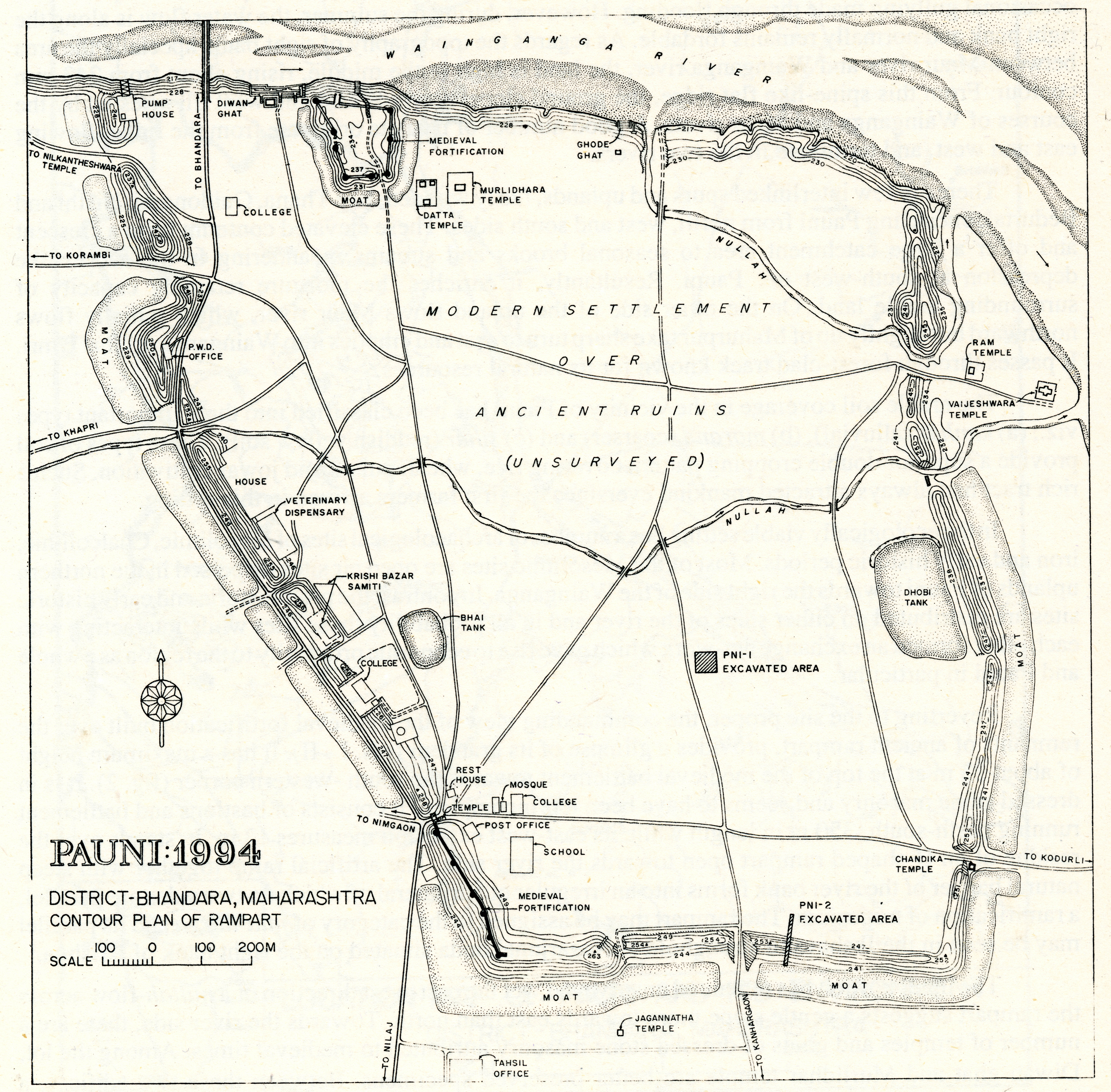
Pauni (Bhandara District). Plan of the historic city

== Introduction ==
Pauni (derived from the name of king "Pavan") is situated on the bank of the Wainganga River known as South Ganga. In ancient times, Pauni was famous for the handloom textile industry. Pauni is an ancient city, surrounded by a rampart and moat, the latter partly preserved. The remains of historical monuments are scattered all over the town. The city wall, atop the rampart, is partly preserved and dates to the seventeenth-eighteenth centuries.

Pawan Raja Fort is in roughly the middle of the town built by King Pavan. It is one of the architectural wonders in Pauni. Though in present time, only the walls of the fort are standing and no remains of the fort are seen, but it is said that the most part of the town was once a territory of the fort. On one side of the fort is a lake. While on the entrance of the fort is a big ancient gate which facilitates connections between two sides of the town.

=== Archaeological sites ===
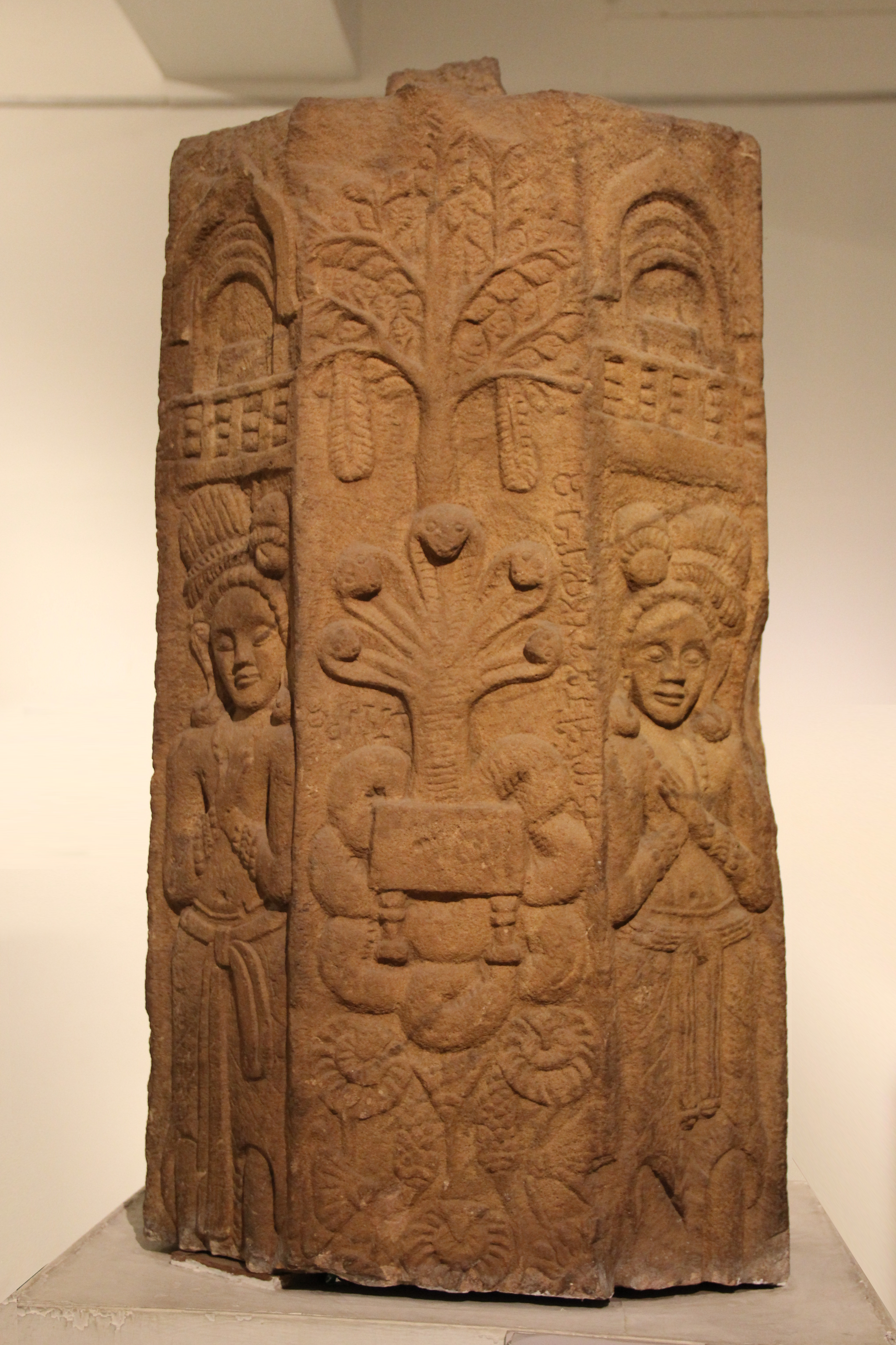
Pillar with Naga Mucilinda protecting the throne of The Buddha. Railing pillar from Jagannath Tekri. Pauni (Bhandara District). 1st century BCE. National Museum of India.

The excavations at Pauni have shown that the area was a centre of Buddhism from the Maurya Empire and Satavahana dynasty times, and coins of the early Satavahana ruler Satakarni were discovered in connection with archaeological finds. One of the excavated stupas, the Suleman Tekri stupa, had a diameter of 41.6 meters, larger than the main stupa at Sanchi.

Jagannath Tekri Stupa. 20.7835°N 79.6357°E There is an earthen mound to the south of Pauni, outside the fort-wall on the bank of the Balasamudra water body. A temple to Jagananath is built on the mound. Rashtrasant Tukadoji Maharaj Nagpur University carried out archaeological excavations around the Jagannath temple in 1969. These excavations unearthed the remains of a large stupa of the early historic period. The stupa has a diameter of 38.1 meters and seems to have been worshipped from the 3rd century BCE to the 3rd century CE, undergoing several waves of enlargements and renovations. The excavations revealed also a number of carved pillars, some on the site, and other pieces now in the National Museum of India and the Chhatrapati Shivaji Maharaj Vastu Sangrahalaya. A number of the pieces of this railing carry Brahmi inscriptions. Four gateways seemingly rather similar to those of Bharhut were also erected. The majority of the inscriptions record donations to the stupa, but one inscription mentions Mucilinda, the earliest reference to this deity in India.

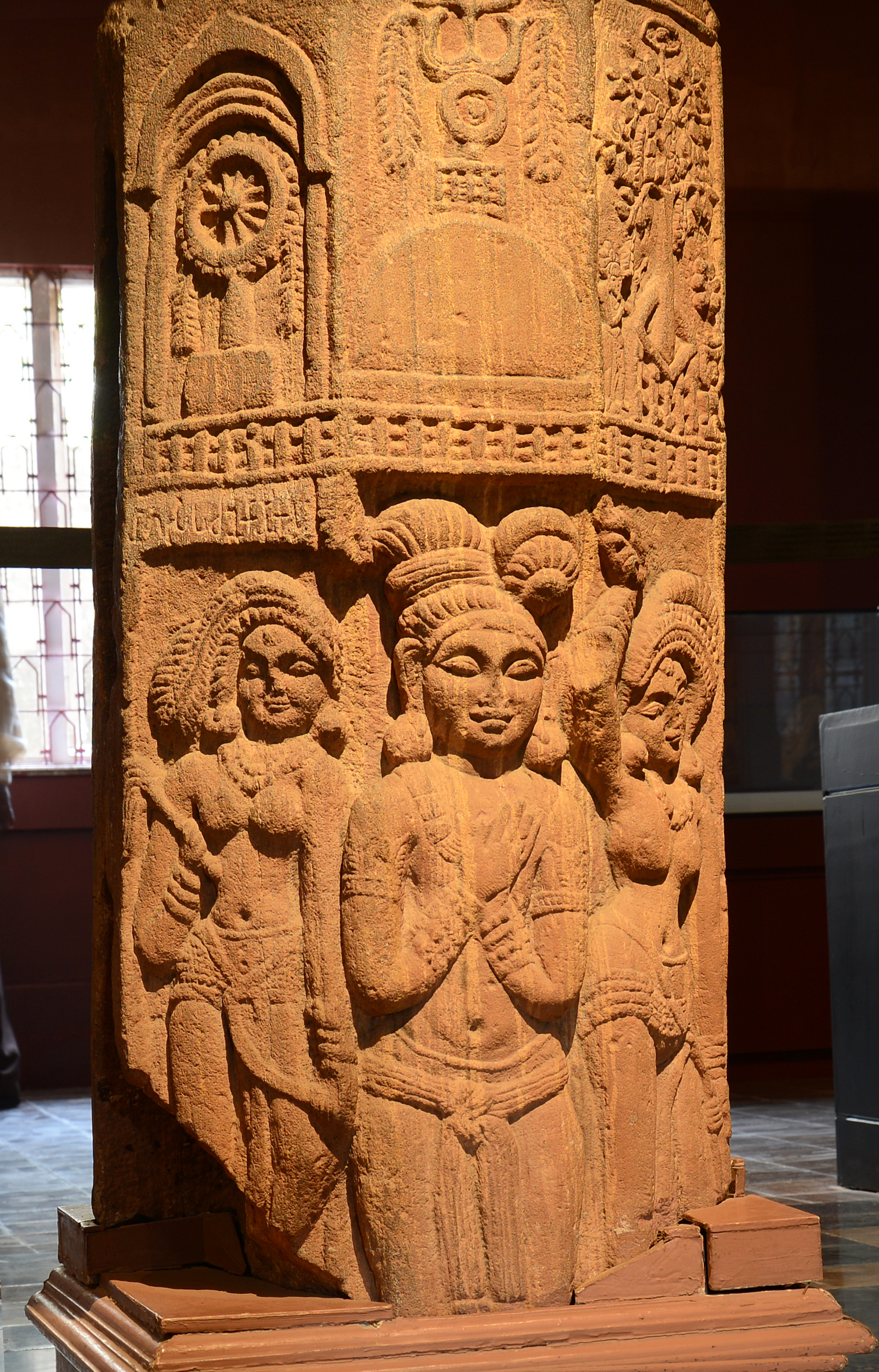
Pauni sculptures on railing pillar, 1st century BCE. Chhatrapati Shivaji Maharaj Vastu Sangrahalaya ref.78.91.

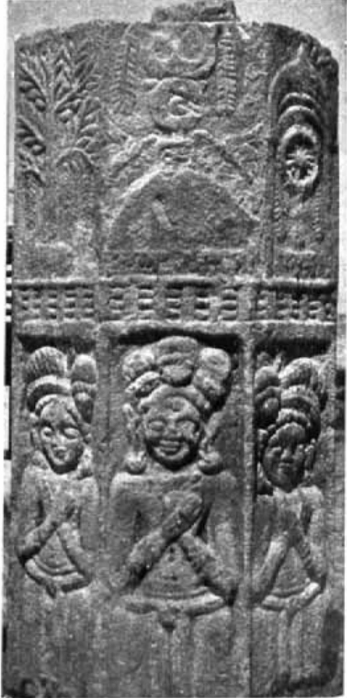
Pauni sculptures on railing pillar.

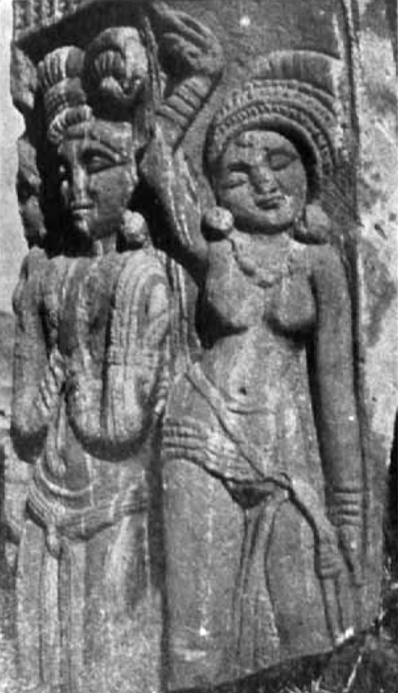
Pauni sculptures on railing pillar, 1st century BCE. Chhatrapati Shivaji Maharaj Vastu Sangrahalaya ref.78.91.

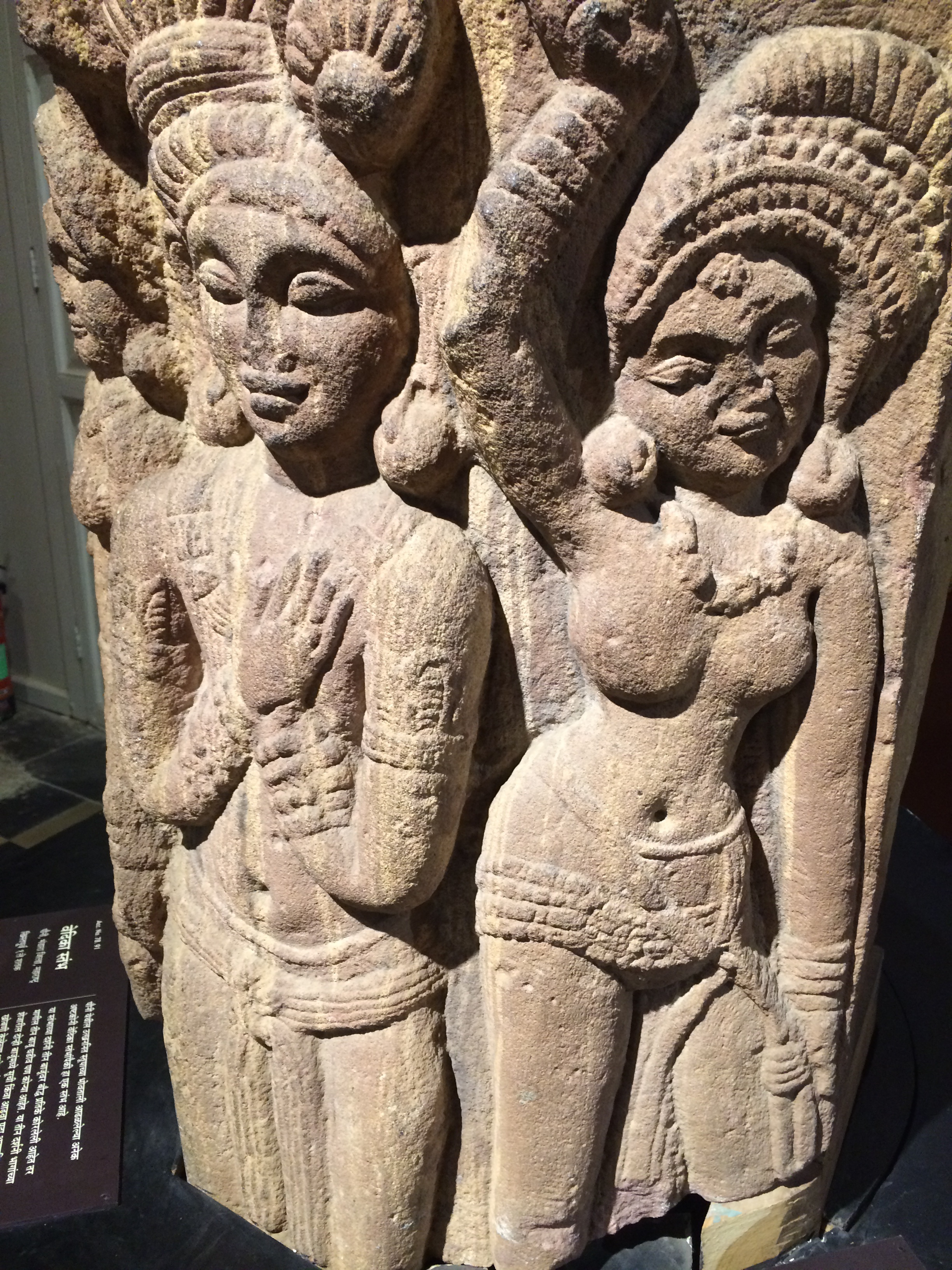
Railing pillar, Pauni, 1st century BCE. Chhatrapati Shivaji Maharaj Vastu Sangrahalaya ref.78.91.

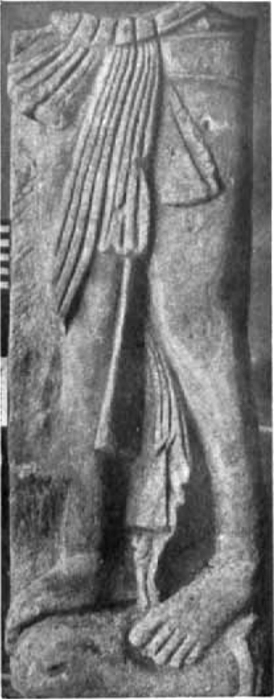
Pauni sculptures on railing pillar.

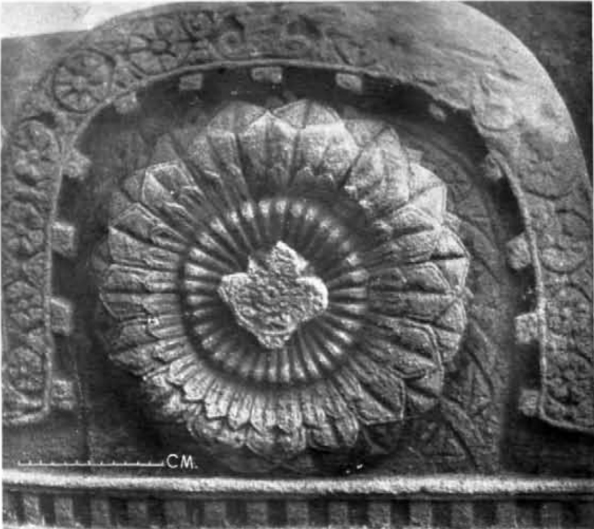
Pauni Carved medallion on coping.

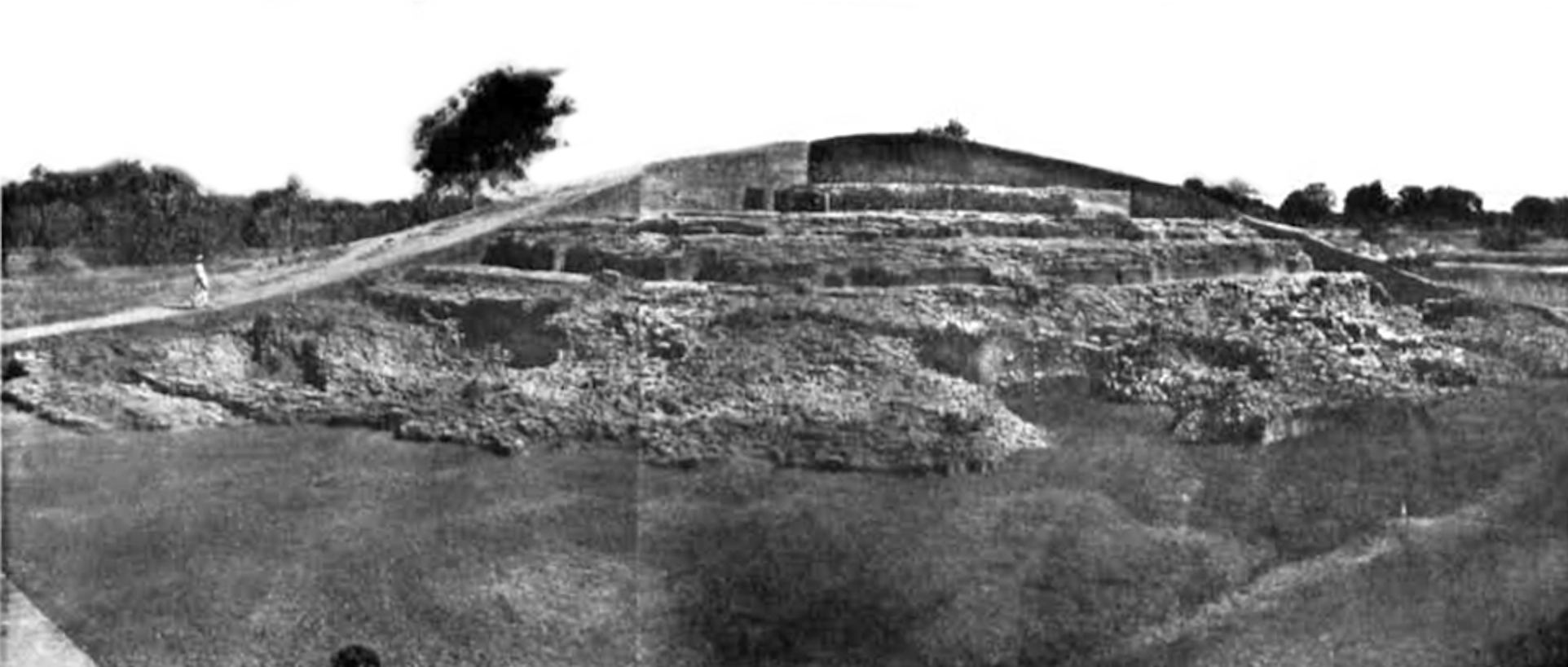
Sulaiman Tekri stupa in Pauni

Suleman Tekri Stupa. A second stupa was excavated by Rashtrasant Tukadoji Maharaj Nagpur University near the village of Chandakapur, about 600 meters south of Jagannath Tekri. The Suleman Tekri stupa has a diameter of 41.6 meters, larger than the main stupa at Sanchi, and is dated to circa the 1st century BCE, with extensions down to the 2nd century CE. Although monumental, no sculptures or decorations were found from this stupa, suggesting a severe, unadorned design. Coins of Satakarni were found in association with the stupa. Coins of the Western Satraps were also found.

Hardolal Tekri. This is a mound outside the town. A large megalith stone was found here, inscribed in the early historic period with the name of the ruler Bhagadatta. The stone is now in the collections of the Nagpur Central Museum. This mound was not a stupa.

=== Coins and inscriptions ===
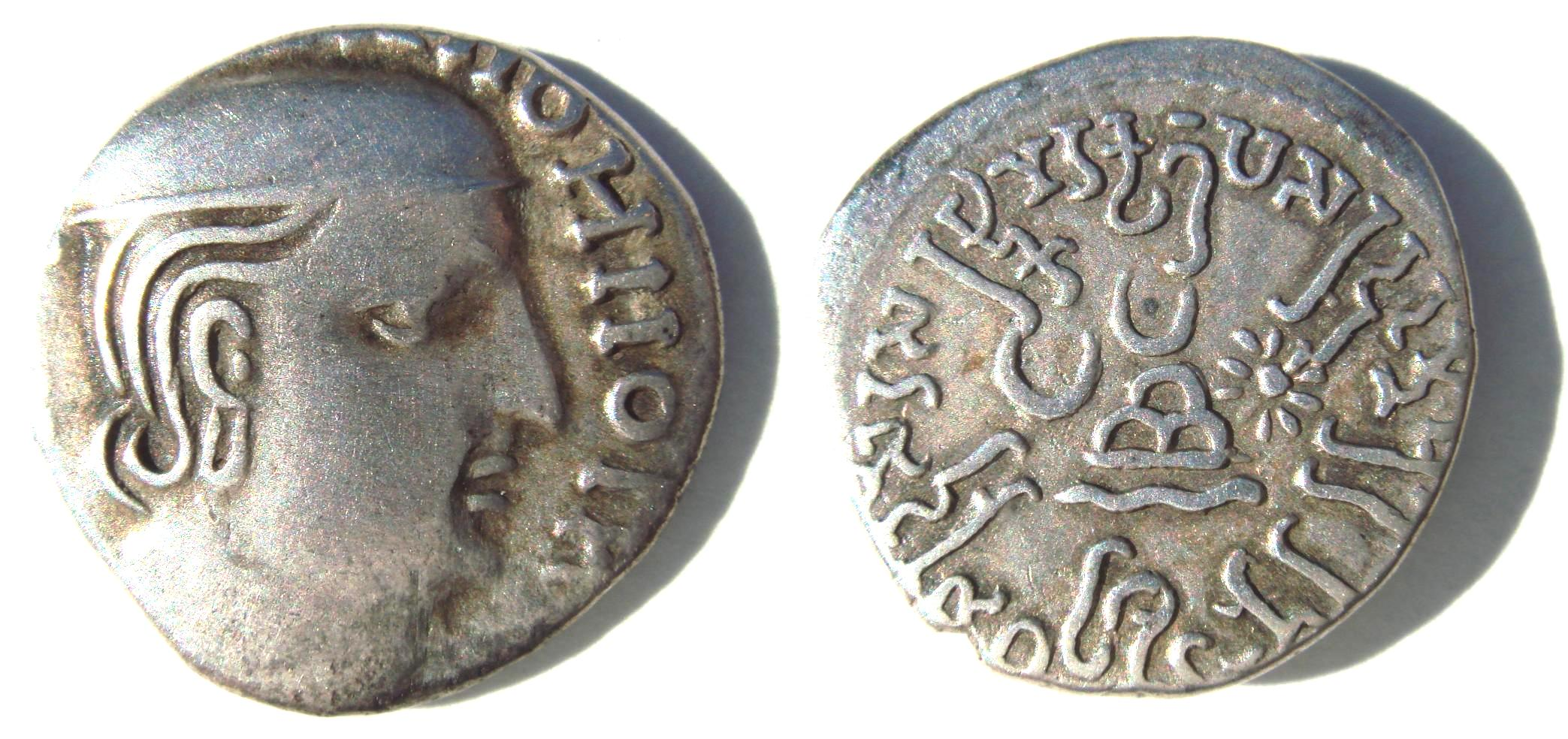
Coins and pillar inscriptions of the Western Satraps were found in Pauni.

Coins were found belonging to the Satavahanas and the Western Satraps (Rudrasimha I). These Satavahana coins, among them coins of the early Satavahana king Satakarni, were found at the two stupa sites, confirming that ancient Vidarbha was part of the Satavahana dynasty (1st century BCE - 2nd century CE).

A few dozen donative inscriptions in the Brahmi script have been found at the site of Pauni, in a style similar to the inscriptions of Bharhut and Sanchi.

==== Great Satrap Rupiamma (2nd century CE) ====
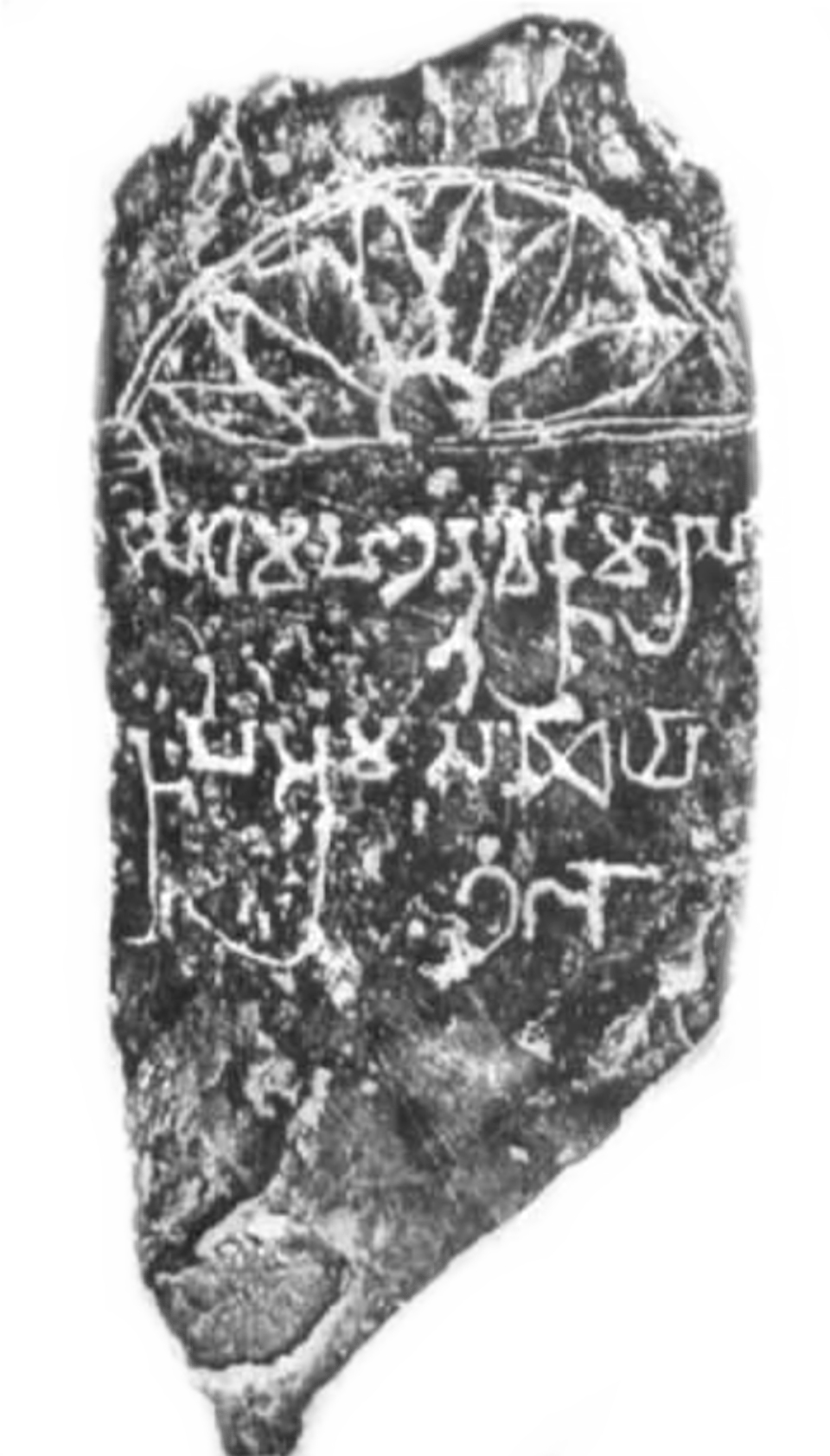
Mahakshatrapa Rupiamma pillar inscription, Pauni. Brahmi inscription: 𑀲𑀺𑀥𑀁 𑀫𑀳𑀔𑀢𑁆𑀢𑀯 𑀓𑀼𑀫𑀭𑀲 𑀭𑀼𑀧𑀺𑀅𑀁𑀫𑀲 𑀙𑀬𑀸 𑀔𑀁𑀪𑁄 Sidhaṃ Mahakhattava Kumarasa Rupiaṃmasa chayā Khambo "Sculpted pillar of Lord Prince and Great Satrap Rupiamma".

A memorial pillar with an inscription in the name of "Mahakshatrapa Kumara Rupiamma" has been recovered in Pauni, and is dated to the 2nd century CE. Rupiamma is probably related to the Saka Western Satraps. This memorial pillar is thought to mark the southern extent of the conquests of the Western Satraps, much beyond the traditionally held boundary of the Narmada River. As a "Great Satrap", Rupiamma may alternatively, or jointly, have been a feudatory or representative of the Kushan Empire, which would suggest that Kushan control also extended this far south, beyond the generally accepted southern boundary formed by the Narmada River. The use of the word "Kumara" may also mean that Rupiamma was the son of a Great Satrap, rather than holding the title himself.

== Demographics ==
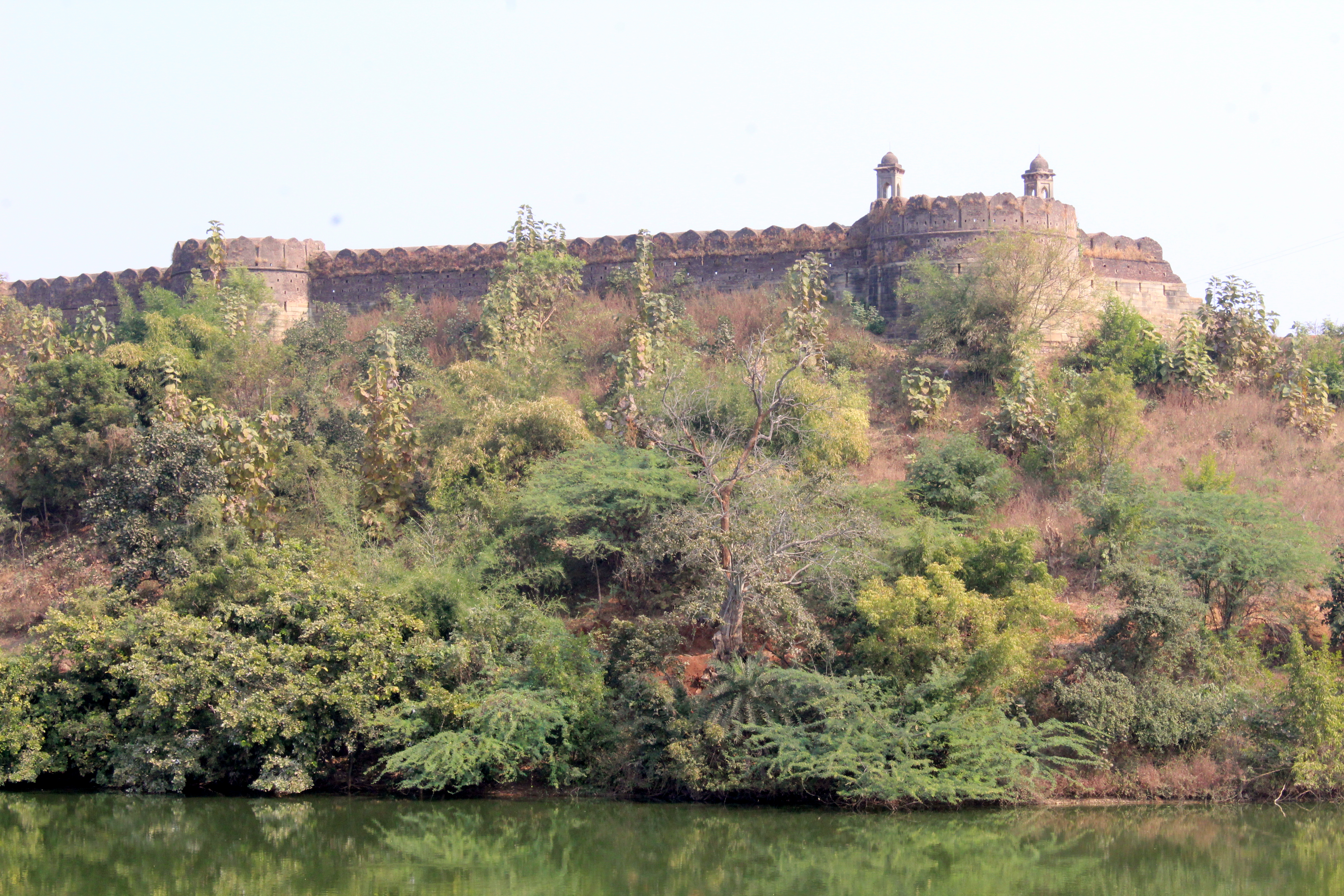
Pauni (Bhandara District). Moat and rampart surmounted by medieval fortification

As of 2001 India census, Pauni had a population of 26250. Males constitute 51% of the population and females 49%. Pauni has an average literacy rate of 71%, higher than the national average of 59.5%: male literacy is 80%, and female literacy is 63%. In Pauni, 12% of the population is under 6 years of age. It was an ancient Buddhist city. Many pilgrims have been found near and in the Pauni.

The river Wainganga flows on the northern side of the town. A number of bathing ghats viz. Diwan Ghat, Ghode Ghat, Vajreshwat Ghat, Hatti Ghat etc. are constructed along the river bank. Some of these ghats are still in good condition. There is a number of small lakes along the fort wall. It appears that there are remains of what once was the water barrier which served the purpose of defending the town from the invaders.

There are about 150 temples scattered all over the town. Pauni has therefore been described as a temple town. The important temples are The Great Goddess Bhangaram Mata Temple, the Dattatraya temples in Vitthal Gujari, the Nilkanth temple, Panchmukhi Ganesh temple, the Chandakai temple, Murlidhar temple, the Vaijeshwar temple, Dhobi Talav Maruti Temple and Ram temple. The entire existing town is located on the remains of an ancient settlement. A number of ring walls constructed of bricks or by placing earthen pots over one another can be seen at several places in Pauni. These were used for the purpose of draining the sewer.

| Year | Male | Female | Total Population | Change | Religion (%) | | | | | | | |
| Year | Male | Female | Total Population | Change | Hindu | Muslim | Christian | Sikhs | Buddhist | Jain | Other religions and persuasions | Religion not stated |
|---|---|---|---|---|---|---|---|---|---|---|---|---|
| 2001 | 11497 | 11090 | 22587 | - | 82.942 | 7.106 | 0.066 | 0.124 | 9.590 | 0.009 | 0.142 | 0.022 |
| 2011 | 11514 | 11307 | 22821 | 0.010 | 81.960 | 7.256 | 0.066 | 0.127 | 10.118 | 0.018 | 0.259 | 0.197 |

== Transportation ==
It is connected to the cities of Bhandara, Nagpur, Chandrapur, Gadchilroli via State and National Highways. Pauni is situated on National Highway 247. Pauni is not far from National Highway 53. It is hardly 45 km (28 mi) from NH 53. It has nearest railway station at Pauni Road at Amman railway station which goes from Nagpur to Nagbhid.
