= Gose Khurd Dam =

Dam in Bhandara, Maharashtra, India

Gosekhurd Dam
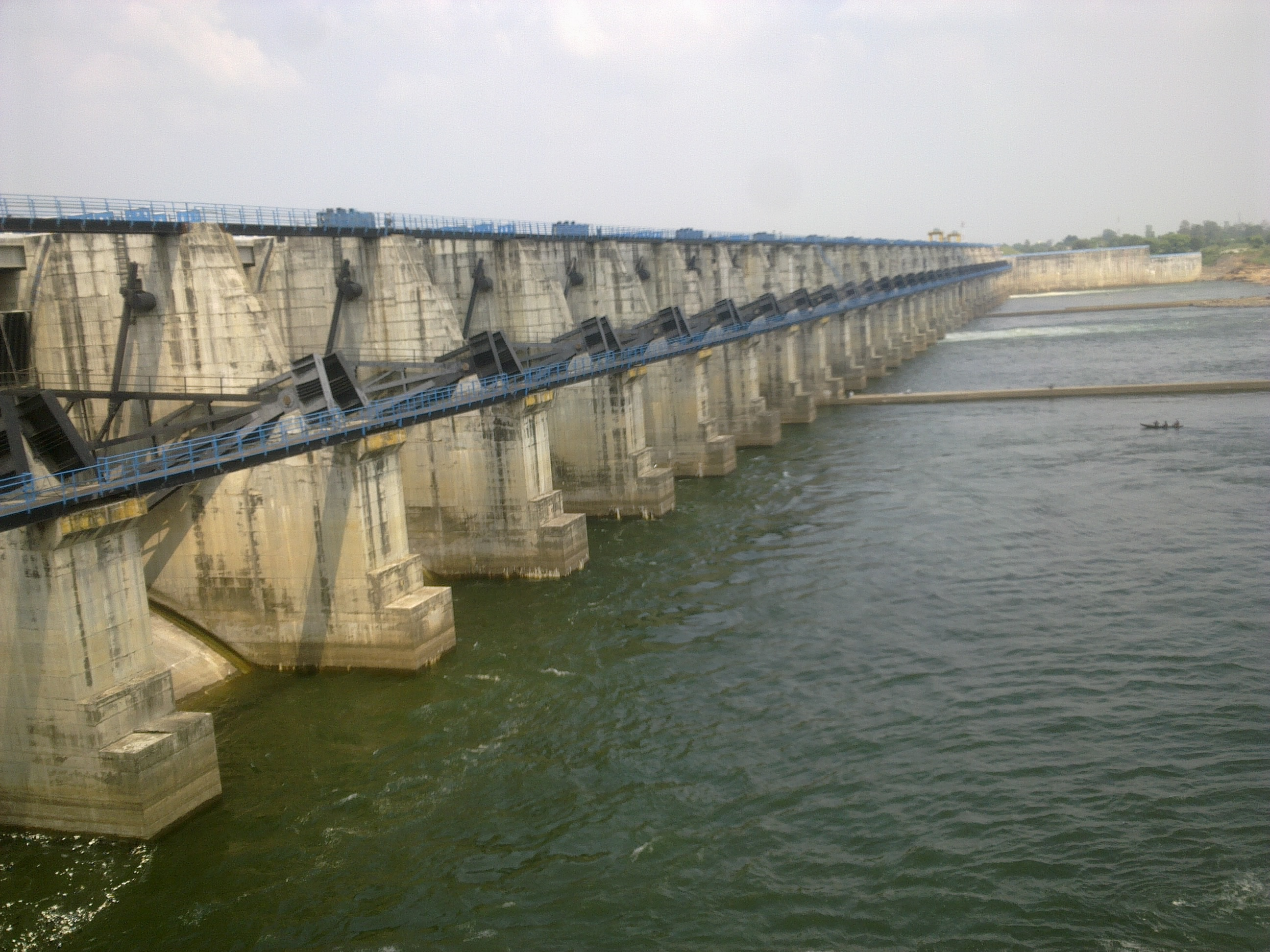
- Gosekhurd Dam

- Location within Maharashtra
- Official name: Gosikhurd Dam (Indirasagar Reservoir)
- Location: Pauni, Bhandara, Maharashtra, India
- Coordinates: 20.8738154°N 79.6081781°E
- Construction began: 1988
- Opening date: 2008
- Owners: Water Resources Department, Government of Maharashtra

Dam and spillways
- Type of dam: Earthen dam with Gates Spillway
- Impounds: Wainganga River
- Height: 22.55 m (74.0 ft)
- Length: 11,356 m (37,257 ft) / 11.35 km (7.05 mi)
- Dam volume: 3.83×10^{6} m^{3} (5,010,000 cu yd)
- Spillways: 33 Radial Gates of size 18.30 m (l) * 16.50 m (h)
- Spillway type: Ogee Shaped Spillway
- Spillway capacity: 67,300 m^{3}/s (2,380,000 cu ft/s)

Reservoir
- Creates: Indirasagar
- Total capacity: 1.15×10^{9} m^{3} (930,000 acre⋅ft)
- Active capacity: 740.168×10^{6} m^{3} (600,064 acre⋅ft)
- Inactive capacity: 405.907×10^{6} m^{3} (329,074 acre⋅ft)
- Catchment area: 34,862 km^{2} (13,460 sq mi)
- Surface area: 222.56 km^{2} (85.93 sq mi)
- Maximum water depth: 22.55 m

Gosekhurd Dam, (Marathi: गोसे खुर्द धरण) is an earthfill dam on the Wainganga River near Pauni in Bhandara district, in the state of Maharashtra in India. The dam contains 33 spillway gates to regulate water flow into the river for irrigation throughout the year.

The height of the dam above lowest foundation is 22.55 m (74.0 ft) while the length is 11,350 m (37,240 ft). The dam volume is 3.83×10^{6} m^{3} (135×10^{6} cu ft) and gross water storage capacity is 1,146×10^{6} m^{3} (40.5×10^{9} cu ft). Its purpose is irrigation and hydropower generation, as well as playing a role in systems for drinking water for the nearby Municipal Council as well as Grampanchayat. The dam was completed in 2008, and the Gosekhurd Reservoir began impounding water in 2009. Because of construction delays occurs due to Rehabilitation problems, the reservoir could not be filled to 100% capacity; the project was completed and the reservoir filled to 100% in Jan 2022.

== See also ==
- List of dams and reservoirs in Maharashtra
- List of dams and reservoirs in India
