= Umred Pauni Karhandla Wildlife Sanctuary =

Wildlife sanctuary in Maharashtra, India

Umred-Pauni-Karhandla Wildlife Sanctuary
- IUCN category IV (habitat/species management area)
- Location within Maharashtra
- Interactive map of Umred-Pauni-Karhandla Wildlife Sanctuary
- Location: Nagpur district and Bhandara district, Maharashtra, India
- Nearest city: Nagpur 58 km (36 mi)
- Coordinates: 20°50′08″N 79°30′40″E
- Area: 189 km^{2} (73 sq mi)
- Established: 2013
- Governing body: State Forest Department Maharashtra Forest Department
- Website: www.mahapenchtiger.com/Bor/Umred-Karhandala.aspx

Umred-Pauni-Karhandla Wildlife Sanctuary is a nature reserve in the state of Maharashtra in India. It is bounded roughly by the Wainganga River and the Gose Khurd Dam in the Bhandara and Nagpur district.

== Wildlife ==
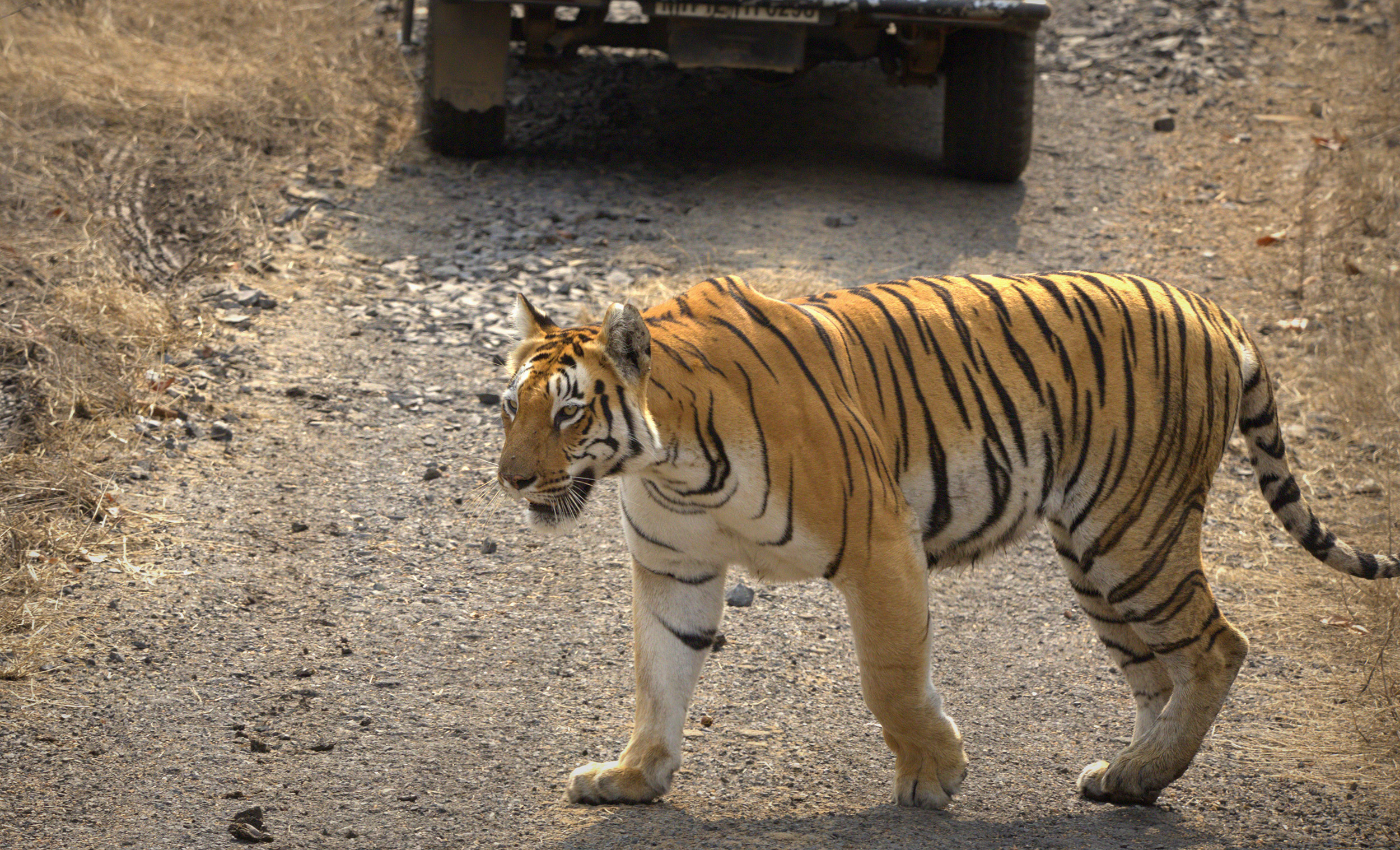
Bengal tiger in Umred Karhandla Wildlife Sanctuary

Umred Pauni Karhandla Wildlife Sanctuary harbours Tiger, Leopard, Dhole, Sloth bear, Gaur, Nilgai, Sambar deer and other deer species.

=== Birds ===
There are more than 90 species of birds belonging to 22 families of 12 different orders recorded in the sanctuary. This includes over 10 species of migratory birds and over seven species of endangered birds.

=== Reptiles ===
The reserve is home to over 26 species of reptiles belonging to eleven families, of which six species are endangered, namely, Indian cobra, Russell's viper, Indian python, Oriental rat snake, Checkered keelback and Monitor lizard.

== Conservation ==
Several water management programs have been created by the NGO Wildlife Trust of India.
