= Baagli =

Baagli Baaglee
- town
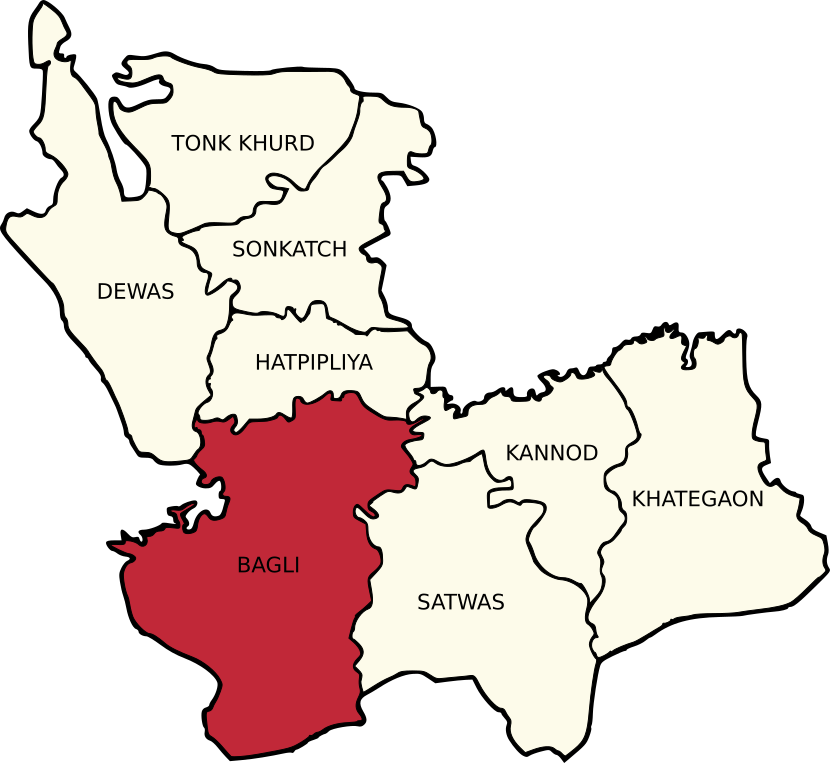
- Baagli Tehsil within Dewas District

- Location in Madhya Pradesh, India Baagli (India)
- Coordinates: 22.65°N 76.35°E
- Country: India
- State: Madhya Pradesh
- District: Dewas
- Elevation: 1,130 m (3,710 ft)

Population (2011)
  - Total: 10,310

Languages
  - Official: Hindi , Malvi
- Time zone: UTC+5:30 (IST)
- Postal code: 455227
- ISO 3166 code: IN-MP
- Vehicle registration: MP55

Baagli is a town and a nagar panchayat in the Malwa region of Dewas district in the state of Madhya Pradesh, India. Bagli is around 66 km (41 mi) from Dewas.

== Demographics ==
As of the 2011 Census of India, Bagli had a population of 10,310. Males constitute 51% of the population and females 49%. Bagli has an average literacy rate of 79.94%, higher than state average of 69.32%. Male literacy is around 87.86% while female literacy rate is 71.63%.

As per current estimates, the population of Bagli Nagar Panchayat in 2025 is approximately 15,000. The scheduled 2021 Census was postponed due to the COVID-19 pandemic, and updated official figures are expected after the next census. According to available data, Scheduled Tribes (ST) constitute 14.17% and Scheduled Castes (SC) 11.80% of the total population. Out of the working population, 3,568 residents are engaged in economic activities, of which 75.14% are main workers and 24.86% are marginal workers.

== Geography ==
One of the most important rivers of MP & Rajasthan, Kali Sindh, flows through the south of the town.

It is the largest tehsil of Dewas district. Parts of Vindhya Range are seen in and around Bagli.

== Religion ==
The Hindu temple of Jata-Shankar dedicated to Lord Shiva is located at the outskirts of the city. People from all over the state visit this religious site.

== History ==
The name "Bagli" comes from the Hindi word "Bagh", meaning "tiger". In the years after the 1857 revolt in India, it was merged with the Gwalior state. Bagli was one of the petty states under the Indore agency. It is situated 36 miles to the south of Indore. The chiefs of Bagli belong to the Jodhpur family of Rathore Rajputs, the state was founded by Thakor ur Gokul Das who was originally and subsequently an adherent of both Malhar Rao Holkar and Ranoji Scindia. Thakor Gokul Das had four sons - Beri Sal, Bharat Singh, Sher Singh and Salam Singh of whom Salam Singh was in position of Bagli state on the occasion of the settlement of Malwa by Sir John Malcolm in 1819 AD. Salam Singh was successfully followed by his son and grandson Bhim Singh and Kishore Singh respectively. Then, later at his death left his second son incharge of the estate. Thakor Raghunath Singh grandson of Kishore Singh who followed him, died suddenly in the year 1896 AD and was succeeded by his son Thakor Ranjit Singh. The chief had received his education at Daly College, Indore. The installation ceremony of the chief was performed by Captain LS Newmarch, who was the first assistant to the agent of the Governor General in India. 1897 AD since that time Raja Ranjit Singh had been conducting the affairs of his estate. Raja Sajjan Singh younger brother of Raja Ranjit Singh succeeded him till the eve of independence. His daughter Smt. Devi Singh married Sri Dayal Das Khemani, whose family has been handling the estate since then.

== Language ==
The most spoken language of Bagli is Malwi, a local dialect spoken in Malwa region of Madhya Pradesh.

== District Demand ==
The demand to make Bagli a district is also raised by the people and the local government. Former Chief Minister of Madhya Pradesh Kailash Joshi also wanted to make Bagli a district. There is a continuous demand for a district in Bagli due to its distance from the district headquarters and for the convenience of the citizens. There is a demand to include Bagli, Kannod, Satwas and Udainagar tehsils in this district.
