= Kheoni Wildlife Sanctuary =

Wildlife sanctuary in Madhya Pradesh, India

- IUCN category IV (habitat/species management area)
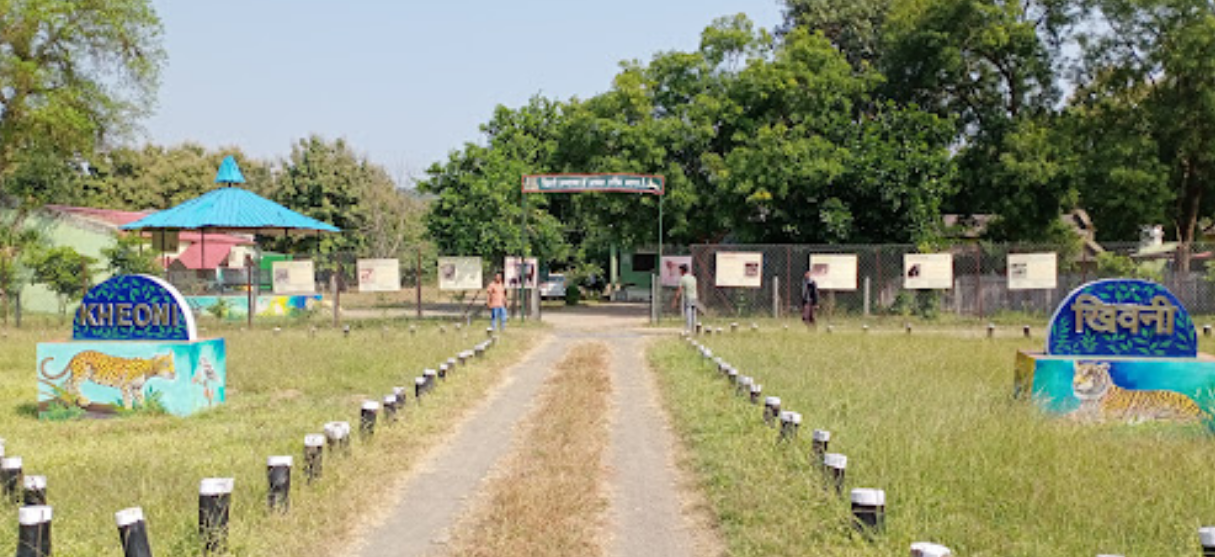

- Location within Madhya Pradesh
- Interactive map of Kheoni Wildlife Sanctuary
- Location: Dewas district and Sehore district in Madhya Pradesh, India
- Nearest city: Kannod
- Coordinates: 22.8373°N 76.8765°E
- Area: 134.778 km^{2} (52.038 sq mi)
- Established: 1974
- Governing body: Forest Department, Madhya Pradesh

Kheoni is a wildlife sanctuary located in Kannod Tehsil of Dewas district and parts of the Sehore district of Madhya Pradesh. It is spread over 132 square kilometers. It is connected to Ratapani Tiger Reserve through corridors. The dry deciduous forest consists of teak, tendu and bamboo.

It has a presence of tigers, which have apparently migrated from Ratapani and colonized Kheoni. Leopards are present in significant numbers. Other commonly found carnivores are jungle cats, jackals and striped hyena. The dominant herbivore species are nilgai, blackbuck, chinkara and chital (spotted deer). Sambar, wild boar, barking deer, four-horned antelope, and palm civet are also present, but rarely sighted.

According to a bird survey done in April 2018, Kheoni has around 125 species of birds, including the state bird of Madhya Pradesh, the Indian paradise flycatcher. Other birds in abundance are plum-headed parakeet, Eurasian collared dove, laughing dove, chestnut shouldered petronia, common crow and black drongo.

== Gallery ==
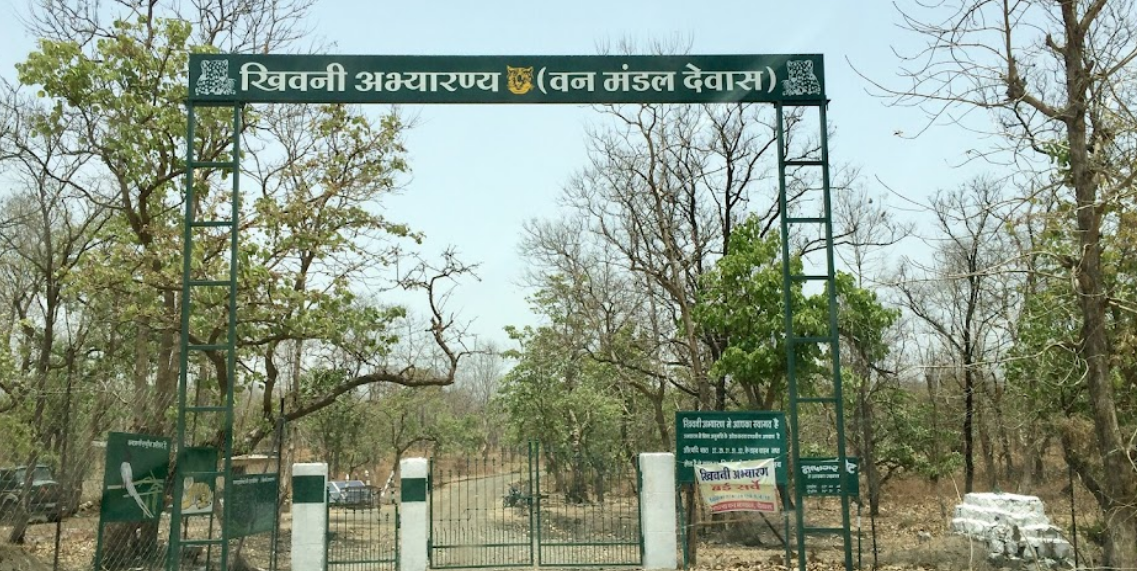
Kheoni Wildlife Sanctuary, Dewas

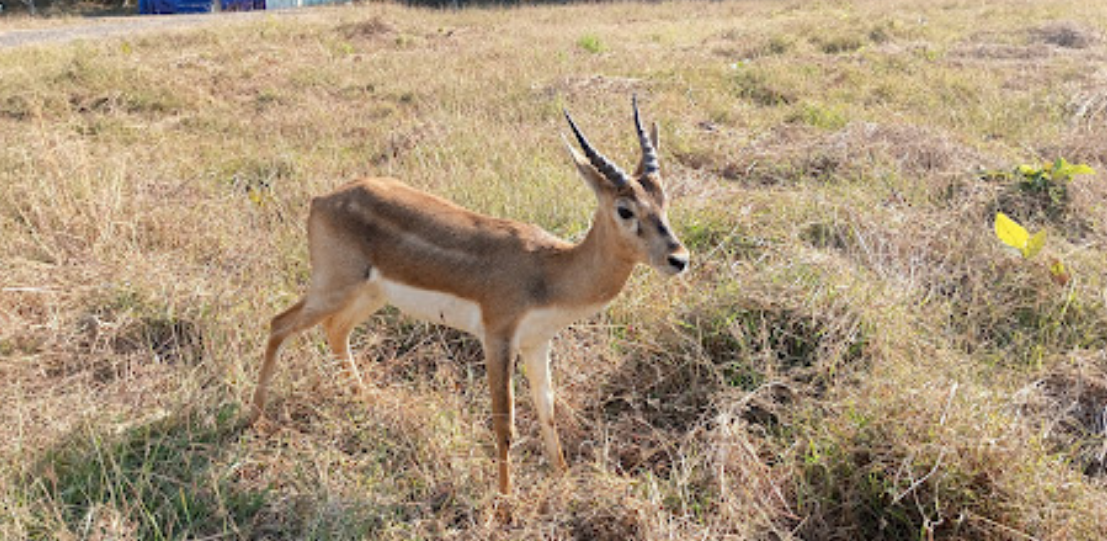
A deer spotted in Kheoni Wildlife Sanctuary
