= Tonk Khurd =

City in Dewas district, Madhya Pradesh, India

- Town
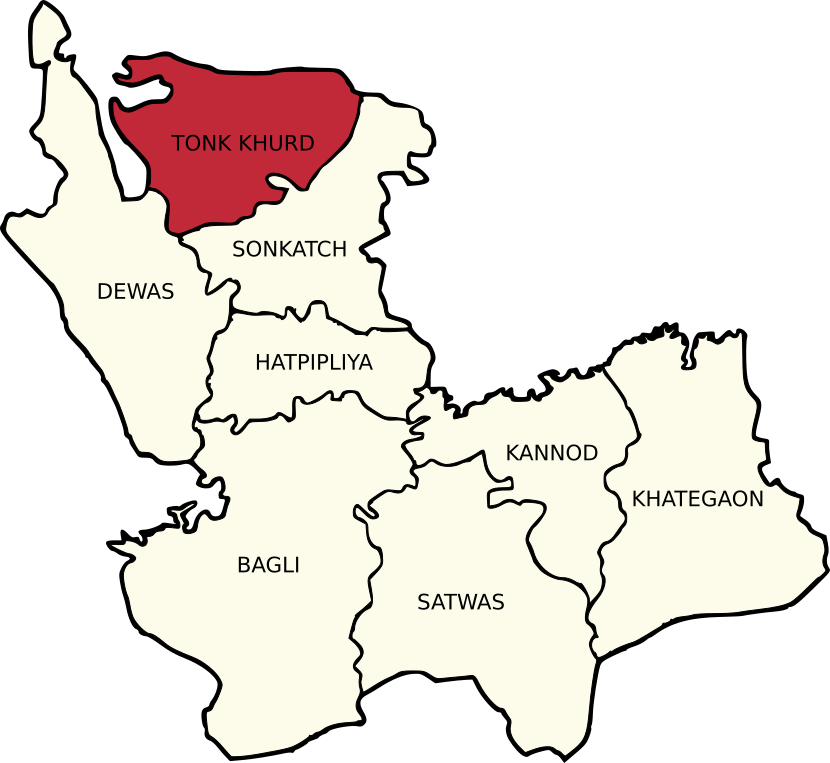
- Tonk Khurd tehsil within Dewas district

- Location in Madhya Pradesh, India Tonk Khurd (India)
- Coordinates: 23.098°N 76.215°E
- Country: India
- State: Madhya Pradesh
- Division: Ujjain
- District: Dewas
- Tehsil: Tonk Khurd

Government
  - Type: Nagar parishad

Area
  - Total: 4 km^{2} (1.5 sq mi)

Population (2011)
  - Total: 7,979
  - Density: 2,000/km^{2} (5,200/sq mi)

Languages
  - Official: Hindi and English
  - Other: Malwi
- Time zone: UTC+5:30 (IST)
- ISO 3166 code: IN-MP
- Vehicle registration: MP 41

Tonk Khurd is a city in Dewas district, in the state of Madhya Pradesh, India. It is the headquarters of Tonk Khurd tehsil and lies 28 km (17 mi) north-east of the district headquarters of Dewas and 172 km (107 mi) west of the state capital, Bhopal.

== Demographics ==
As of the 2011 India census, Tonk Khurd had a population of 7,979 spread over 1,409 households. Males constitute 51.7% of the population and females 48.3%. Tonk Khurd has an average literacy rate of 77.56%, male literacy is 89.09%, and female literacy is 65.46%. 13.84% of the population is under 6 years of age.

== Government and politics ==
=== Civic administration ===
Tonk Khurd is administered by a Nagar Parishad (City Council). Its responsibilities include sanitation, street lights, maintenance of birth and death records.

=== Representation in Parliament and State Assembly ===
At the state level, Tonk Khurd falls within the Sonkatch (Vidhan Sabha constituency). As of November 2020, its representative in the Vidhan Sabha is Sajjan Singh Verma of the Indian National Congress.

At the national level, the city is falls within the Dewas (Lok Sabha constituency). As of 2019, its Member of Parliament is Mahendra Solanki of the Bharatiya Janata Party.

== Education ==
As of the 2011 census, Tonk Khurd had 10 primary schools, 2 middle schools, 6 secondary schools, 3 senior secondary schools and 1 degree-level college.
