= Khategaon =

Khategaon Ktg hariganj
- City
- Location in Madhya Pradesh, India Khategaon (India)
- Coordinates: 22.6°N 76.92°E
- Country: India
- State: Madhya Pradesh
- District: Dewas

Government
  - MLA: Virendra Singh Rajawat (BJP)
  - Chairperson Nagar Palika: Smt. Sarika Narendra Choudhary
- Elevation: 405 m (1,329 ft)

Population (2026)
  - Total: 37,819

Languages
  - Official: Hindi
- Time zone: UTC+5:30 (IST)
- PIN: 455336
- Telephone code: 07274
- ISO 3166 code: IN-MP
- Vehicle registration: MP-41

Khategaon is a town and municipal council in Dewas district in the Indian state of Madhya Pradesh. It is a subdistrict headquarters and an assembly constituency. Khategaon has additional district and session courts under the jurisdiction of the high Court of Madhya Pradesh.

It is a major agriculture hub and has a developed agricultural produce market committee.

== Demographics ==
As of 2001 India census, Khategaon had a population of 21,018. Males constitute 52.5% of the population and females 47.5%.

== Government ==
Khategaon Assembly constituency is one of the 230 Vidhan Sabha (Legislative Assembly) constituencies of Madhya Pradesh state in central India. As of 2023 its representative is Virendra singh Rajawat of the Bharatiya Janata Party.

== Other information ==
Previously, Khategaon was called Harigarh (Hariganj), after a notable personality of Khategaon. Harda, Dewas, Indore, Bhopal, Hoshangabad, Nasrullaganj, Khandwa, Kannod, Satwas, Nemawar are nearby towns.

== Transportation ==
The National Highway 47 passes through Khategaon, connecting to major cities. Khategaon is connected with nearby towns by a daily bus services.
