= Kantaphod =

Kantaphod Kauntapoor
- city
- Location in Madhya Pradesh, India Kantaphod (India)
- Coordinates: 22°34′25″N 76°33′36″E
- Country: India
- State: Madhya Pradesh
- District: Dewas

Population (2001)
  - Total: 9,240

Languages
  - Official: Hindi
- Time zone: UTC+5:30 (IST)
- ISO 3166 code: IN-MP
- Vehicle registration: MP

Kantaphod is a small village and a nagar panchayat in Dewas district in the Indian state of Madhya Pradesh. It is located on the foot of Malwa plateau on the bank of Chandrakeshar river.

== Demographics ==
As of 2001 India census, Kantaphod had a population of 9,240. Males constitute 52% of the population and females 48%. Kantaphod has an average literacy rate of 52%, lower than the national average of 59.5%: male literacy is 63%, and female literacy is 41%. In Kantaphod, 18% of the population is under 6 years of age.

The main occupation of the people being agriculture, cotton, and soybean. These are the major kharif crops. Only .2 km from the village there is a dam on Chandrakeshar river. This is the major source of irrigation in the rabi season. A few number of ginning factories are situated in the region.

== Connectivity ==
=== Rail ===
Kanntaphod has no rail connectivity. The nearest important railway station is Indore Junction railway station and Harda railway station.

=== Air ===
The nearest airport is Devi Ahilyabai Holkar Airport, Indore.
