= Iklehra =

- Census town
- Location in Madhya Pradesh, India Iklehra (India)
- Coordinates: 23.15°N 76.38°E
- Country: India
- State: Madhya Pradesh
- District: Dewas district
- Elevation: 457 m (1,499 ft)

Population (2001)
  - Total: 9,206

Languages
  - Official: Hindi
- Time zone: UTC+5:30 (IST)
- ISO 3166 code: IN-MP
- Vehicle registration: MP

Iklehra is a census town in Dewas district in the Indian state of Madhya Pradesh.

== Geography ==
Iklehra is located at 23.15°N 76.38°E. It has an average elevation of 457 metres (1,499 feet).

== Demographics ==
As of 2001 India census, Iklehra had a population of 9,206. Males constitute 52% of the population and females 48%. Iklehra has an average literacy rate of 67%, higher than the national average of 59.5%: male literacy is 76%, and female literacy is 58%. In Iklehra, 12% of the population is under 6 years of age. There are five schools.

== Transport ==
The nearest airport is Jabalpur.
