= Loharda =

- Town
- Location in Madhya Pradesh, India Loharda (India)
- Coordinates: 22°35′33″N 76°35′48″E
- Country: India
- State: Madhya Pradesh
- District: Dewas

Population (2001)
  - Total: 8,101

Languages
  - Official: Hindi
- Time zone: UTC+5:30 (IST)
- ISO 3166 code: IN-MP
- Vehicle registration: MP

Loharda is a town and a nagar parishad in Dewas district in the Indian state of Madhya Pradesh.

== Demographics ==
As of 2001 India census, Loharda had a population of 8,101. Males constitute 52% of the population and females 48%. Loharda has an average literacy rate of 48%, lower than the national average of 59.5%: male literacy is 60%, and female literacy is 35%. In Loharda, 18% of the population is under 6 years of age.
