= Golpura =

- village
- Location in Madhya Pradesh, India Golpura (India)
- Coordinates: 22.494748576178633°N 76.78703521918804°E
- Country: India
- State: Madhya Pradesh
- District: Dewas

Government
  - MLA: Ashish Sharma (BJP)

Languages
  - Official: Hindi
- Time zone: UTC+5:30 (IST)
- PIN: 455336
- Telephone code: 07274
- ISO 3166 code: IN-MP
- Vehicle registration: MP-41

Golpura is a village and a Panchayat in Dewas district in the Indian state of Madhya Pradesh. Dulwa Village is a major agricultural production area in Madhya Pradesh. In the 2011 Census of India its population was reported as 585.
