= Kali Sindh River =

Coordinates: 25.5331°N 76.2820°E

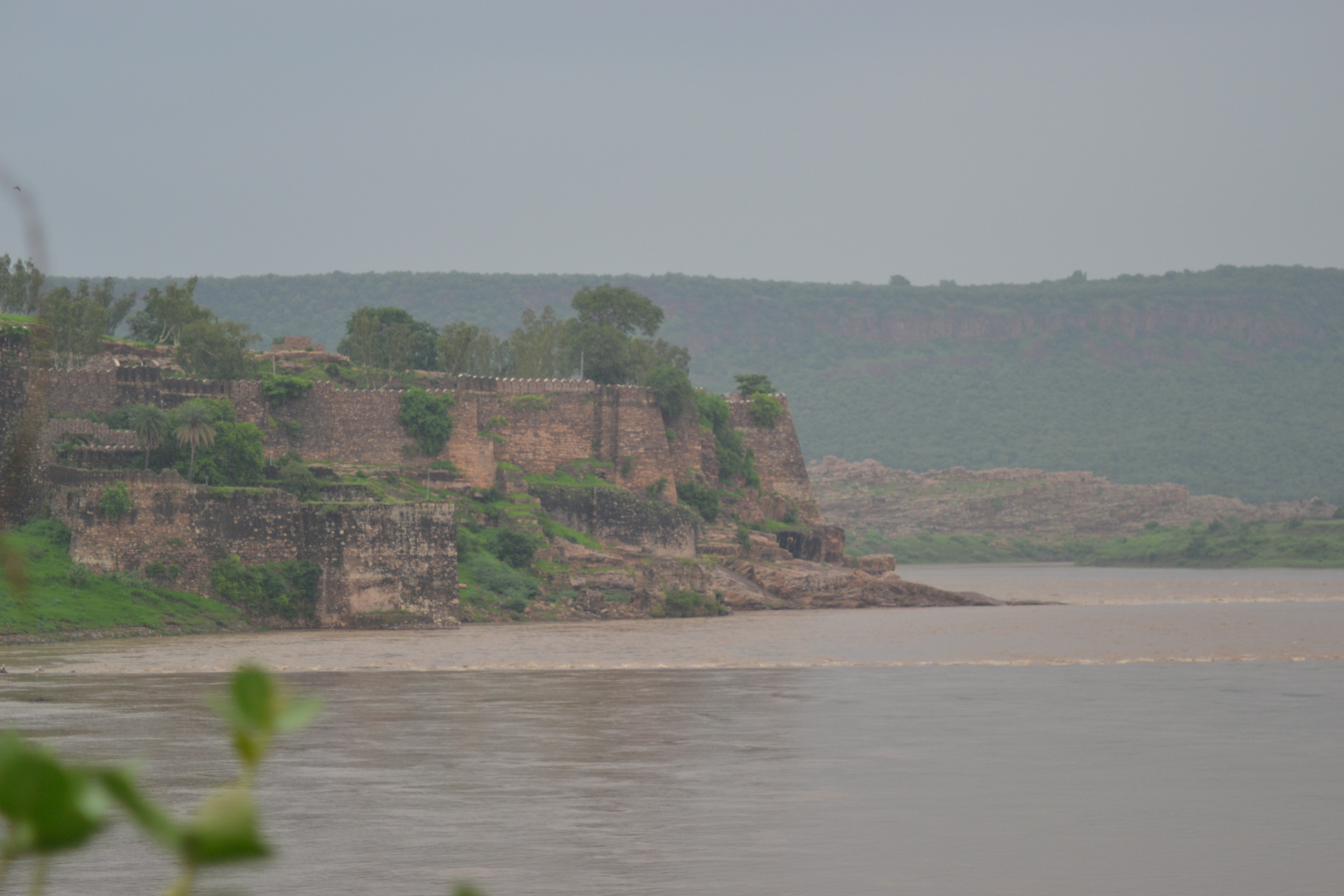
- Confluence of the Kali Sindh and Ahu rivers at Gagron Fort
- Native name: काली सिंध (Hindi)

Location
- Country: India

Physical characteristics
- Source: Vindhya Range near Bagli
  - location: Bagli, Dewas
- Mouth: Chambal River
- Length: 230 km (140 mi)
- Basin size: 48,492 km^{2} (18,723 sq mi)

The Kali Sindh (Krashna Sindhu) is a river in Madhya Pradesh and Rajasthan in northern India. It is a tributary of the Chambal River in the Ganges Basin. The main tributaries of the Kali Sindh are the Parwan, Niwaj and Ahu rivers. The Kali Sindh River drains a major portion of the Malwa region, and is the biggest river flowing in the Malwa region of Madhya Pradesh.

== Geography ==
The Kali Sindh is a perennial stream in the Chambal drainage of the Yamuna Basin of the greater Ganges Basin. It typically reaches flood stage during the monsoon season of India. In its lower reaches it forms an alluvial plain. Bauxite deposits are found along the Kali Sindh in Kota district at Baselio, Majola, and Sherol-khera.

The 550-kilometer Kali Sindh river flows for 405 kilometers in Madhya Pradesh and 145 kilometers in Rajasthan.

=== Course ===
The Kali Sindh rises in the Vindhya Range near Bagli in Dewas district of Madhya Pradesh.

It crosses State Highway No 18 east of Indore near Sonkatch where it used to block the road traffic for hours when in flood in older times. It passes through Sundersi town in Shajapur district. Then it marks the boundary between Shajapur and Rajgarh districts near Soyatkalan and enters Rajasthan near Binda village. It passes through Baran, Jhalawar and Kota districts of Rajasthan and joins the Chambal River at Nonera village in Kota district. The Kali Sindh is fed by the Ahu, Newaj and Parwan Rivers.

=== Major tributaries ===
The main tributaries of the Kali Sindh River are:

- the Ahu River which flows generally northerly through Jhalawar and Kota districts of Rajasthan, is joined by its tributary the Amjar, and flows into the Kali Sindh near Gagron Fort;
- the Newaj River which flows through Jhalawar and Kota districts of Rajasthan; and
- the Parban River (Parwan) which originates in Sehore district of Madhya Pradesh. The Parban flows through Sehore, Shajapur and Rajgarh districts in Madhya Pradesh, and through the Jhalawar, Kota and Baran districts of Rajasthan. It meets the Kali Sindh in Baran district of Rajasthan.

=== Dams on Kalisindh River ===
- Kalisindh Dam is a major dam across the river situated in Jhalawar district of Rajasthan.

== Historical places ==
- Sonkatch (Dewas district in Madhya Pradesh)
- Sundersi Famous for mahakaleshwar temple. The temple is same as mahakaleshwar temple of ujjain.
- Sarangpur (Rajgarh)
- Nalkheda (Agar Malwa)
- Soyatkalan (Agar Malwa)
- Jhalrapatan (Jhalawar) (On left bank)
- Jhalawar (On right bank)
- Palaitha Fort (On the right bank)
