= Chandpura Village =

Chandpuravillage
- village
- Location in Madhya Pradesh, India Chandpuravillage (India)
- Coordinates: 23.85446156557356°N 77.29701514064364°E
- Country: India
- State: Madhya Pradesh
- District: Dewas

Government
  - MLA: Ashish Sharma (BJP)

Languages
  - Official: Hindi
- Time zone: UTC+5:30 (IST)
- PIN: 455336
- Telephone code: 07274
- ISO 3166 code: IN-MP
- Vehicle registration: MP-41

Chandpura Village is a village and a Panchayat located in the Dewas district of the Indian state of Madhya Pradesh. It is known for its significant agricultural production in the region of Madhya Pradesh. According to the 2011 Census of India, the population of Chandpura Village was reported to be 585.
