= Nagukhedi =

Coordinates: 22.9861°N 76.0129°E

Nagukhedi is a village in Dewas district of Madhya Pradesh state of India.
