= Bardha Village =

- village
- Location in Madhya Pradesh, India Bardha Village (India)
- Coordinates: 22.625699384544564°N 76.95893190699881°E
- Country: India
- State: Madhya Pradesh
- District: Dewas

Government
  - MLA: Ashish Sharma (BJP)

Languages
  - Official: Hindi
- Time zone: UTC+5:30 (IST)
- PIN: 455336
- Telephone code: 07274
- ISO 3166 code: IN-MP
- Vehicle registration: MP-41

Bardha Village is a village and a Panchayat in Dewas district in the Indian state of Madhya Pradesh. It is one of the state's major agricultural production areas. Earlier, Harngaon was called Harigarh. As of 2001 India census,
