= Barchhakhurd =

- village
- Location in Madhya Pradesh, India Barchhakhurd (India)
- Coordinates: 22.555737511575057°N 76.89313201309193°E
- Country: India
- State: Madhya Pradesh
- District: Dewas

Government
  - MLA: Ashish Sharma (BJP)

Languages
  - Official: Hindi
- Time zone: UTC+5:30 (IST)
- PIN: 455336
- Telephone code: 07274
- ISO 3166 code: IN-MP
- Vehicle registration: MP-41

Barchhakhurd is a village and a Panchayat in Dewas district in the Indian state of Madhya Pradesh. Barchhakhurd Village is a major agricultural production area in Madhya Pradesh. Earlier, Harngaon was called Harigarh.As of 2001 India census,
