= Gulana, Madhya Pradesh =

Town in Madhya Pradesh (India)

Gulana
- town
- Location in Madhya Pradesh, India Gulana (India)
- Coordinates: 23°40′10″N 76°9′49″E
- Country: India
- State: Madhya Pradesh
- District: Shajapur

Population (2011)
  - Total: 6,594

Languages
  - Official: Hindi, Malwi
- Time zone: UTC+5:30 (IST)
- PIN: 465220
- Telephone code: 07362

Gulana or Golana is a town and Tehsil Headquarter in Shajapur District of Madhya Pradesh. Gulana was an assembly constituency until 2008. It was abolished in 2008.

465220 Is Pin Code of Gulana. Its located 21 km away from District Headquarter.

== Demographics ==
Gulana has population of 6,594 of which 3,409 are males while 3,185 are females as Census 2011.

== Agriculture ==
The economy of Gulana is mainly dependent on agriculture. Being in Kali Sindh besin, the land here is fertile. Wheat and soybean are the main crops here.

== Education ==
- CM rise School, Gulana
- Govt High School, Gulana
- Govt College, Gulana

== Transport ==
It is well connected by roads. Gulana is connected by private bus services to all nearest major cities.

- Nearest airport is Indore Airport.

== See also ==
- Bolai
- Sundarsi
