= Bolai =

- Town
- Location in Madhya Pradesh, India
- Coordinates: 23.38°N 76.47°E
- Country: India
- State: Madhya Pradesh
- District: Shajapur District

Languages
  - Official: Hindi
- PIN: 465220
- Vehicle registration: MP 42

Bolai (Village ID: 472818) is a town and railway station in Gulana Tehsil in Shajapur District in Malwa Region of the Indian state of Madhya Pradesh. It is around 26 km away from Shajapur.

== Demographics ==
As per Census of India 2011 Bolai town has population of 7,436, including 3,830 males and 3,606 females. The sex ratio is 942. 1,474 families reside there.

== Transport ==
Bolai is a railway station on Ujjain-Bhopal Section. The town is well-connected by road to Shajapur, 26 km away.

== Culture ==
Siddhaveer Hanuman Temple is a 300-year-old temple.

== See also ==
- Gulana
- Sundarsi
