= Nemawar =

- village
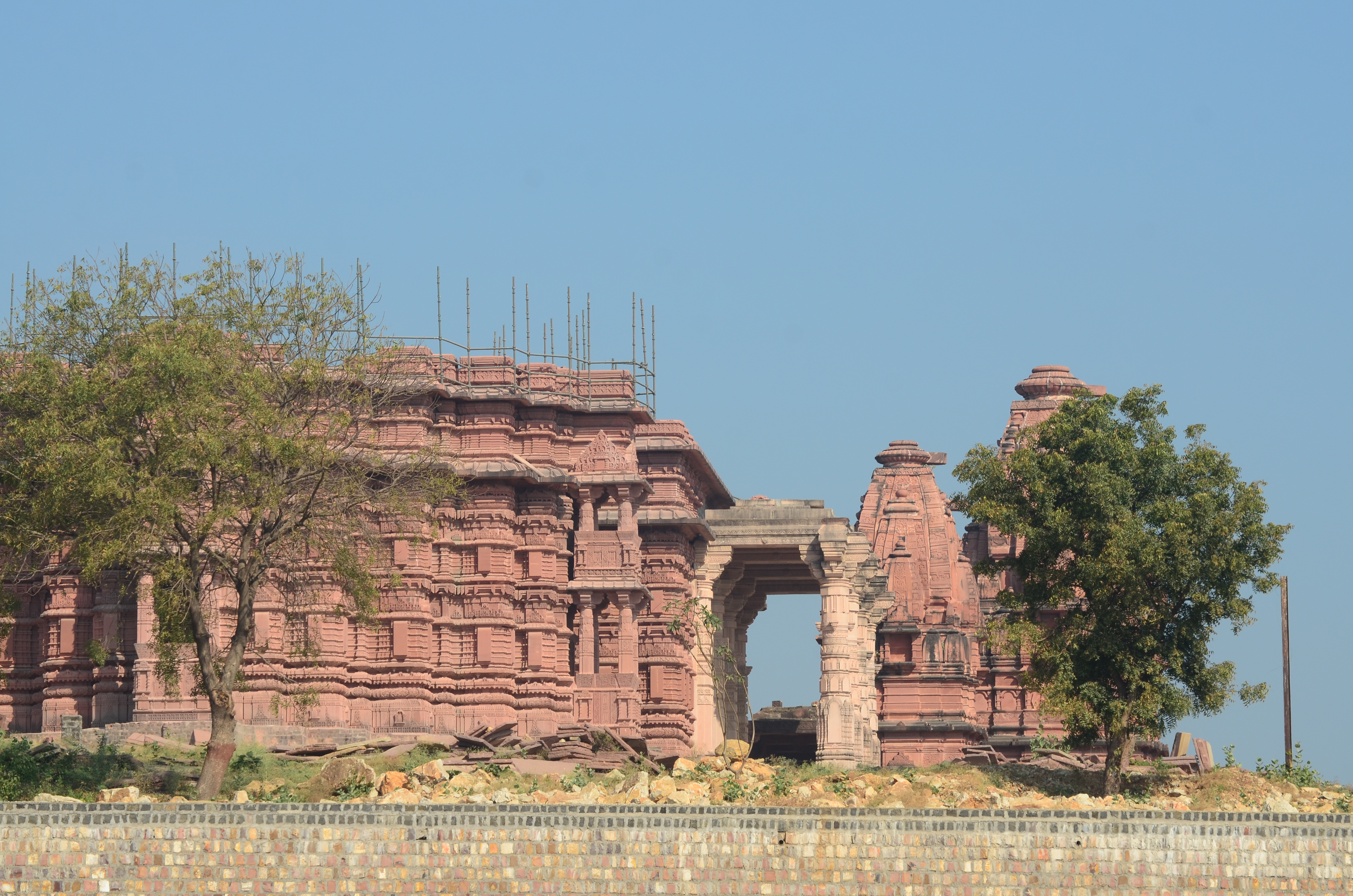
- Trikal Choubisi Jain Temple

- Location in Madhya Pradesh, India Nemawar (India)
- Coordinates: 22°30′0″N 76°58′0″E
- Country: India
- State: Madhya Pradesh
- District: Dewas
- Elevation: 250 m (820 ft)

Languages
  - Official: Hindi
- Time zone: UTC+5:30 (IST)
- PIN: 455339
- ISO 3166 code: IN-MP
- Vehicle registration: MP
- Nearest city: Harda
- Literacy: 77.2%
- Lok Sabha constituency: Vidhisha
- Avg. summer temperature: 48 °C (118 °F)
- Avg. winter temperature: 05 °C (41 °F)

Nemawar is a small town in Dewas District, Madhya Pradesh, India. Nemawar is located on the left bank of the Narmada river opposite to Handia. However, it belongs to Khategaon block and tehsil of the Dewas district

Nemawar is a holy place for both Hindus and Digambara sect of Jains. Pilgrims on Narmada Parikrama often visit this place.

== Location ==
Nemawar is 128 km from Indore, on National Highway 59A (Nemawar Road). Nearest Railway station Harda which is 24 km from Nemawar.

== Demographics ==
Nemawar is a village with a total 1,241 families residing. The Nemawar has population of 5,978 of which 3,131 are males while 2,847 are females as per Population Census 2011. In Nemawar village population of children with age 0-6 is 848 which makes up 14.19% of total population of village. Average Sex Ratio of Nemawar village is 909 which is lower than Madhya Pradesh state average of 931. Child sex ratio for Nemawar as per census is 884, lower than Madhya Pradesh average of 918.

Nemawar village has higher literacy rate compared to Madhya Pradesh. In 2011, literacy rate of Nemawar village was 74.15% compared to 69.32% of Madhya Pradesh. In Nemawar, male literacy stands at 82.51% while female literacy rate was 65.01%.

As per constitution of India and Panchyati Raaj Act, Nemawar village is administrated by Sarpanch (Head of Village) who is elected representative of village.

== History ==
Nemawar was ruled by Rege (Sarmandal) from 1765 to 1947, as they were Jahagirdars of Holkars of Indore. Prabhakarrao Sarmandal was the last ruler till 1947 and Ramchanchandrao was first from around 1765.

== Places of interest ==
Important places to see in Nemawar:

- Siddheshwar temple or Siddhanath Temple, Nemawar: This highly ornate ancient temple of Lord Shiva, called Siddhnath is the most impressive of all. This is the loftiest temple of Parmar dynasty. The temple is an example of Bhumija architecture style, similar to Udayeshwara temple at Udayapur. It is a west facing rather than usual east facing temples elsewhere. Temple has star shaped base with beautiful shikaras. This temple is under archeological survey of India protection. Narmada mata temple and Ganesh temple are also present in the temple vicinity.
- Sun temple: It is a roofless unfinished temple located little north of Siddheshwar temple, which is the only Vaishnava temple hitherto known of the stellate class of the bhumija style.
- Nabhi Kund: Nemawar is the Nabhi sthan (Navel) of Narmada river. It is present in the center of Narmada river.
- Surya kund or Suraj kund: It is also present in the middle of Narmada river. Lord Vishnu statue present here.
- Renuka mata temple: Temple of Renuka .
- Balmukund Seva Aashram 1 km from Nemawar ghat where people are served with food and place to stay who move for panchkoshi yatra (Narmada parikrama).
- Riddhanath temple: This temple present on the opposite bank of Narmada river, in Handiya. There are several ancient small temples nearby.
- Digambar Jain Teerth Kshetra or Siddhoday Jain temple and Trikal Choubisi Jain Temple - massive temple complex which is an architectural marvel nearing completion that is being built around the ancient Jain temples under the guidance of Acharya Shri Vidhya Sagarji Maharaj
