= Kannod tehsil =

Location in Madhyapradesh, India

- Tehsil
- Location in Madhya Pradesh Kannod tehsil (India)
- Coordinates: 22°39′58″N 76°44′13″E
- Country: India
- State: Madhya Pradesh
- District: Dewas district

Government
  - Type: Janpad Panchayat
  - Body: Council

Languages
  - Official: Hindi
- Time zone: UTC+5:30 (IST)
- ISO 3166 code: MP-IN

Dewas tehsil is a tehsil in Dewas district, Madhya Pradesh, India. It is also a subdivision of the administrative and revenue division of bhopal district of Madhya Pradesh.
