= Ahu River =

River in Madhya Pradesh and Rajasthan, India

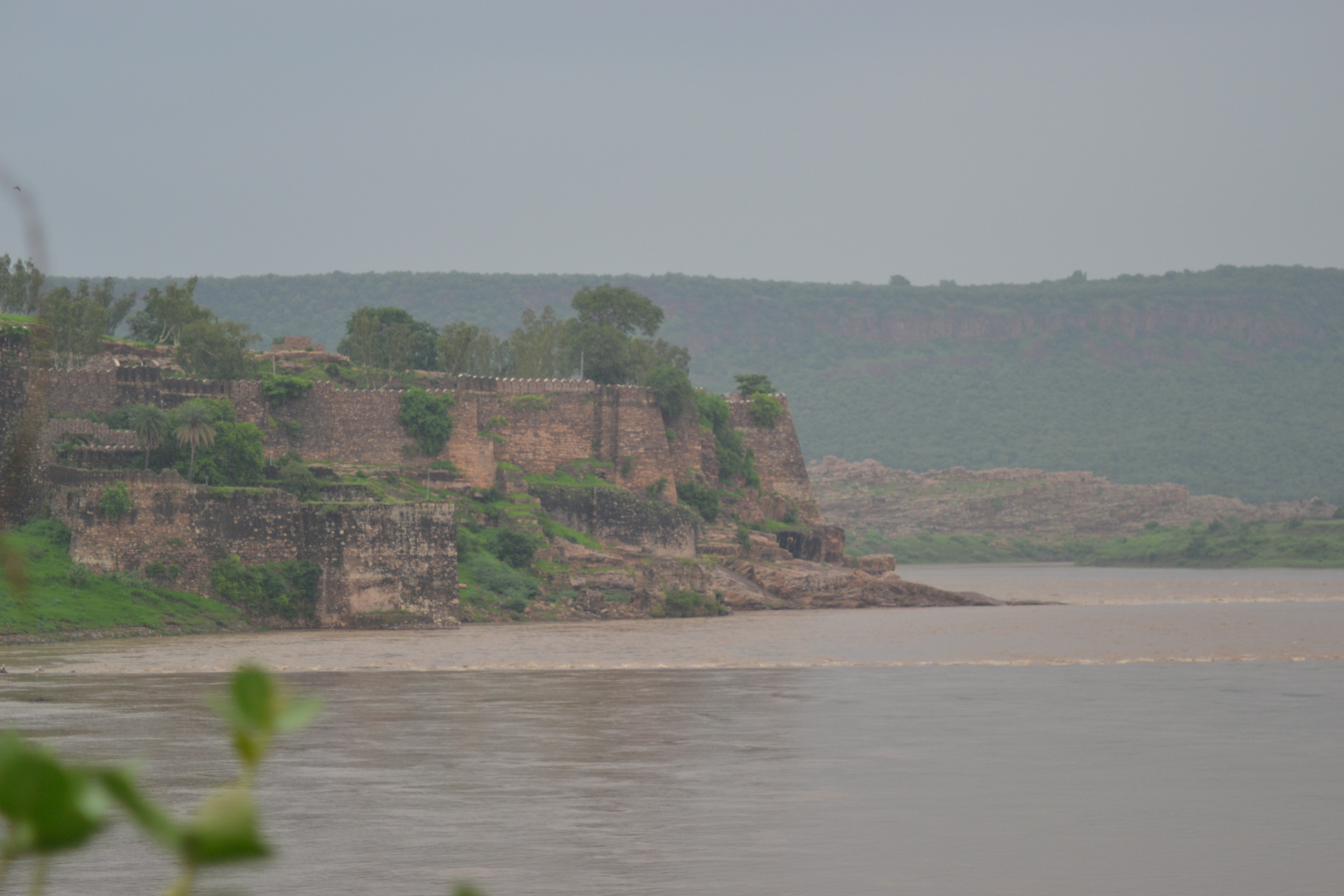
- Confluence of the Kali Sindh and Ahu rivers at Gagron Fort
- Interactive Map

Location
- Countries: India

Physical characteristics
- Source: Tonkra hill, Agar Tehsil, Agar Malwa District, Madhya Pradesh
- Mouth: Kali Sindh River
  - location: north of Jhalawar
  - coordinates: 24°37′17″N 76°11′14″E

The Ahu River is an Indian river that starts its journey from the Tonkra hill in Agar tehsil in Agar Malwa district. It flows through the north-western boundary of the district, forming a natural border with Jhalawar District, Rajasthan. The river's course is characterized by its meandering path as it winds through the landscape before merging with the Kali Sindh River.

== Geography ==
The Ahu River flows through the scenic landscapes of Shajapur District and Jhalawar District. Its waters originate from the heights of the Tonkra hill and eventually find their way to the Kali Sindh River.

== Tributaries ==
The Ahu River is relatively small and does not have major tributaries of its own. Its significance lies in its role as a contributor to the Kali Sindh River.

== See also ==
- Kali Sindh River
- Shajapur District
- Jhalawar District
