= Sonkatch =

Sonkatch Sonekutch
- Town
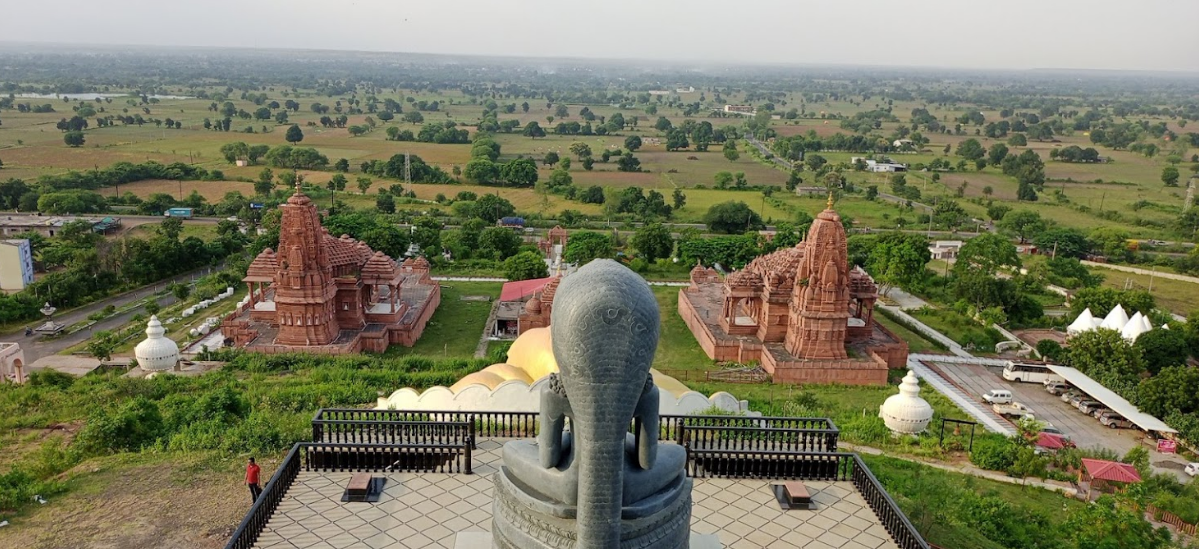
- Pushhpagiri Jain Mandir Sonkatch

- Location in Madhya Pradesh, India Sonkatch (India)
- Coordinates: 22°58′24″N 76°21′13″E
- Country: India
- State: Madhya Pradesh
- District: Dewas

Population (2011)
  - Total: 26,135

Languages
  - Official: Hindi
- Time zone: UTC+5:30 (IST)
- ISO 3166 code: IN-MP
- Vehicle registration: MP

Sonkatch is a town and a Nagar panchayat in Dewas district in the Indian state of Madhya Pradesh. It's also a Tehsil headquarter of District.

== Geography ==
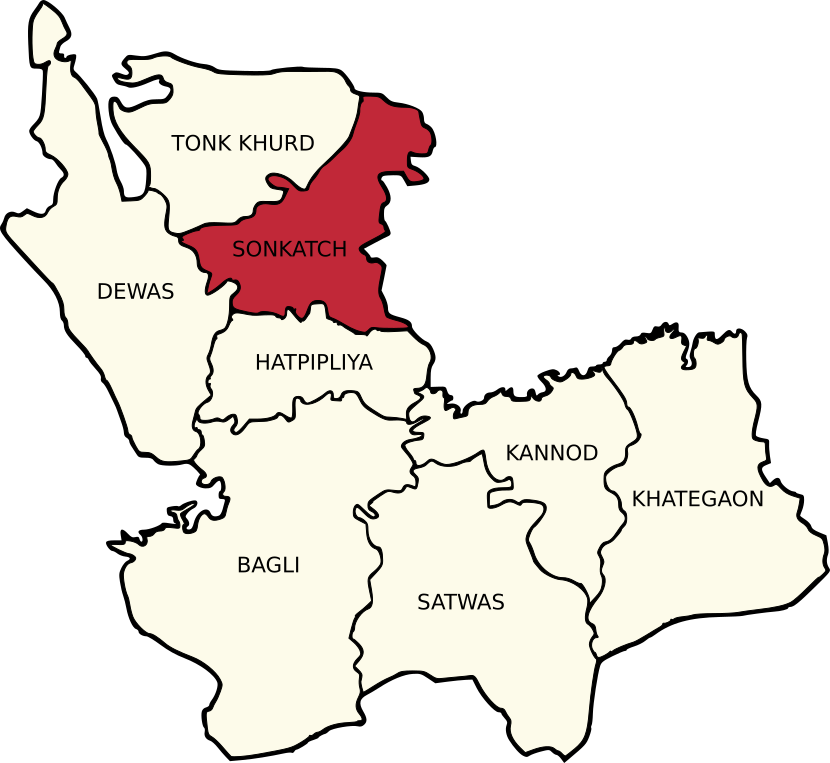
Sonkatch location in Dewas District

Sonkatch located on 22°58′24″N 76°21′13″E. Sonkatch located in Northestern part of dewas district, it's located on bank of Kali Sindh River.

== Demographics ==
At the 2001 India census, Sonkatch had a population of 15,543. Males constituted 51% of the population and females 49%. Sonkatch had an average literacy rate of 69%, higher than the national average of 59.5%: male literacy was 77%, and female literacy was 61%. In Sonkatch, 15% of the population were under 6 years of age.

== Temple ==
=== Pushpagiri Jain Teerth ===
The temple here is dedicated to Lord Mahavir. This Jain kshetra is a 250-acre complex housing Jain Sthanaks, school, hospital, museum, cottages, shopping centers and above all, a 108 fool tall idol of Bhagwan Paraswanath in a yogic (padmasan) posture. This would be one of tallest Jain idols surpassing even 57' height Bhagwan Bahubali idol at Shravanabelgola in Karnataka.

== Government ==
Sonkatch is one of the 230 Vidhan Sabha (Legislative Assembly) constituencies of Madhya Pradesh. Rajesh Sonkar is elected mla of Sonkatch from Bhartiya Janta Party in 2023 Madhya Pradesh Legislative Assembly election. entire assembly is part of Dewas Lok Sabha constituency.

== Transportation ==
Sonkatch is located on the bank of the Kali Sindh river on the NH-86 Indore - Bhopal road. It is 70 km from Indore, 33 km from Dewas, 70 km from Ujjain and 118 km from Bhopal. Dewas is the nearest Railway station.
