= Satwas =

Satwas Sutwas
- Town
- Nickname: Satya ki Nagri
- Location in Madhya Pradesh, India
- Coordinates: 22.53°N 76.68°E
- Country: India
- State: Madhya Pradesh
- District: Dewas

Government
  - Type: Nagar Parishad
- Elevation: 303 m (994 ft)

Population (2011)
  - Total: 14,108

Languages
  - Official: Hindi
- Time zone: UTC+5:30 (IST)
- Postal code: 455459

Satwas is a town and a Nagar Panchayat in the Indian state of Madhya Pradesh. Satwas is around 136.8 km (85.0 mi) from Dewas.

== Geography ==
Satwas is a Tehsil in Dewas District of Madhya Pradesh. Satwas Tehsil headquarters is Satwas town. It belongs to Ujjain Division and is located 105 km (65 mi) East of district headquarters Dewas and 150 km (93 mi) east of state capital Bhopal.

Satwas Tehsil is bordered by Khategaon Tehsil on the East, Kannod Tehsil on the North, Bagli Tehsil on the West and Baladi Tehsil on the South. Harda City, Sehore City, Dewas City, Barwaha City and Seoni-Malwa City are nearby cities.

Satwas Tehsil consists of 150 Villages and 40 Panchayats.

Nearby destinations include Jayantimata Temple (Barwaha) 40 km (25 mi), Indira Sagar Dam 52 km (32 mi), Omkareshwar (Omkareshwar Jyothirlinga) 120 km (75 mi), SalkanPur Mata Temple 100 km (62 mi), Nemawar 42 km (26 mi), Bhimbetka (Bhim Baithaka), Indore, Bhopal and Itarsi.

Satwas' summer day temperature ranges between 31 °C to 45 °C. Average temperatures of January is 21 °C, February is 23 °C, March is 29 °C, April is 34 °C, May is 37 °C.

== Demographics ==
=== Population ===
The Satwas Nagar Panchayat has a population of 14,108 of which 7,243 are males while 6,865 are females, living in 2,798 houses as per Census India 2011.

Children age 0-6 number 2274, 16.12% of the total. The female sex ratio is of 948 against state average of 931. The child sex ratio in Satwas is around 974 compared to Madhya Pradesh average of 918.

Literacy rate of Satwas city is 67.81%, lower than state average of 69.32%. In Satwas, male literacy is around 78.77% while female literacy rate is 56.19%.

Schedule Tribes (ST) make up 9.15% while Schedule Castes (SC) were 7.53% of the total.

Out of total population, 5,191 were engaged in work or business activity. Of this 3,700 were males while 1,491 were females. In census survey, worker is defined as person who does business, job, service, and cultivator and labour activity. Of total 5191 working population, 84.80% were engaged in Main Work while 15.20% of total workers were engaged in marginal work.

=== Religion ===
2011 Data
Hindu	Muslim	Christian	Sikh	Buddhist	Jain	Others	Not Stated
56.71%	40.86%	0.10%	1.83%	0.03%	0.47%	0.00%	0.01%

== Governance ==
Satwas Nagar Panchayat supplies basic amenities like water and sewerage. It builds roads within Nagar Panchayat limits and imposes taxes on properties coming under its jurisdiction.

Satwas city is divided into 15 wards for which elections are held every 5 years.

== Transport ==
The nearest railway station is Harda (60 km [37 mi]) away. The major railway station Indore Jn Bg is around 100 km (62 mi) away.
