= Sundersi =

Sundersi Shwah N'Dersey Sundarsi
- Town
- Nickname: Mini ujjain
- Location within Madhya Pradesh Location within India
- Coordinates: 23.26°N 76.44°E
- Country: India
- State: Madhya Pradesh
- Region: Malwa
- District: Shajapur
- First settled: 1032 B.C.
- Founder: King Sudarshan
- Named for: Queen Sundarabai

Area
  - Total: 40.1 km^{2} (15.5 sq mi)

Population (2011)
  - Total: 11,112
- Demonym: Sundersian

Languages
  - Official: Hindi, Malvi
- Time zone: UTC+5:30 (IST)
- PIN: 465113
- Area code: 07364
- Vehicle registration: MP-42

Sundersi is a town in the Shajapur District of Madhya Pradesh known for its Mahakaleshwar Jyotirlinga temple which mirrors the one in Ujjain.The town is situated at the banks of Kalisindh river. Sundarsi was estate of Rathore Rajputs with special status under Gwalior state .The sundarsi was initially a tributary of Gwalior state

== Demographics ==
=== Population ===
As of 2011 India census,[4] Sundersi had a population of 11,112. Males constitute 52% of the population and females 48%.

The current population of town is 15,125.Sundarsi's population is expected to reach 8,62,670 by 2050, according to analysts.

=== Literacy ===
Sundersi has an average literacy rate of 58.4%, lower than the national average of 59.5%: male literacy is 75%, and female literacy is 24.3%. In Sundersi, 15% of the population is under 6 years of age.

== History ==
=== Gupta Empire (Golden Era) ===
Sundersi, which is in Madhya Pradesh's Malwa region, has a long history that began when King Sudarshan founded the town in 1032 B.C. It flourished as a metropolis during its heyday. Notably, Sundarabai, the sister of Ujjain's King Vikramaditya, got married with Bhagwat singh ji in Sundersi, which inspired King Vikramaditya to build the Mahakaleshwar Jyotirlinga temple and several other temples in her honor.

=== Mughal Empire (Mughal Era) ===
Historical recognition came to the town when Abul Fazal, one of Akbar's nine jewels, wrote about Sundersi in his book "Ain-e-Akbari." This acknowledgement highlights the importance of the town during the Mughal Empire.

=== British Raj (British Era) ===
Sundersi contributed to the independence movement in a more modern setting. Tatya Tope, the famous independence warrior, came to Sundersi to organize a rebellion against the British Raj and the East India Company in Malwa.

== Geography ==
=== Location ===
Sundersi is located on Malwa Plateau at 23.26°N 76.44°E. It has an average elevation of 450 metres. The town is 88 km from the Devi Ahillyabai Holkar Airport and is reached by very good road. Town is situated at the bank of Kalisindh river. It is situated between Shajapur & Shujalpur on the SH-17 and is 24 km. from Shajapur, 30 Kilometers from Shujalpur and 82 Kilometers from Indore. The town is 600 km from the capital New Delhi.

=== Resources ===
The town of Sundersi also known as Mini Ujjain is situated along the Kalisindh River's banks. Black soil is the defining feature of the northern and western parts of Sundersi, whereas infertile and arid conditions are found in the southern area (Baldi) and a large portion in the Blaine County such as Lalbazar, Paleto, Western Mangliya and Badipura . Garhmundla is a stream located in the southwest, close to the Mahakaleshwar Jyotirlinga shrine.

== Pronunciation ==
Sundersi is pronounced: /suːnˈdɛərsi/. The second syllable is stressed the most.

The beginning vowel is pronounced very quickly, as opposed to being dragged out like in the English word soon. The first syllable should consequently be uttered in a short, compact way. The stressed middle syllable includes the /ɛər/ sound, which is similar to the vowel sound heard in English phrases like fair, bear, or care. The ending /si/ sounds the same as the English word see. "Sun-dar-si" and "sin-dar-si" are frequent mispronunciations. Although neither represents the preferred pronunciation in the area, the latter is more common among speakers from neighboring rural areas.

The name is also known by its native name, Shwah N'Dersey, which is the customary local pronunciation.

== Tourist attractions ==
Mahakaleshwar Jyotirlinga:Sundersi's largest temple, located in the south, is devoted to Lord Shiva.

Harsiddhi Mata Temple: This temple is dedicated to Harsiddhi Mata and is located near Mahakal Ashram and Mahakaleshwar Jyotirlinga Temple.

Gora Bhairav Temple:One of the main temples dedicated to Lord Gora Bhairav, located in Bhairupura village to the west of Sundersi.

Gopal Mandir:This temple is devoted to Lord Krishna and is located in Sundersi's market area.

Kshipreshwar Mahadev Temple:This temple is dedicated to Lord Shiva and is located on the banks of the Kalisindh River.

Jageshwar Mahadev Temple:This temple is devoted to Lord Shiva and is located in the central northeastern section of Sundersi.

Other Tourist attractions: Mahishasur Mardini, Garh Kalika, Kaal Bhairav, Chausath Yogini, Yogi Kund, Kaliadeh, Thop ka Chabutara, Ugnu Dhara, Garh mundla, Bhagwat Garh, Resham Tila, Suneri Darwaza, Maharaja Darwaza, Nagar Khal, Ghudsaal, Gaj Stambh, Saas Bahu ki Talai etc.

== See also ==
- Gulana
- Bolai
