= List of districts of Madhya Pradesh =

Chambal division Gwalior division Bhopal division Ujjain division Indore division Narmadapuram division Sagar division Rewa division Shahdol division Jabalpur division

The Indian state of Madhya Pradesh came into existence on 1 November 1956. Currently there are 55 districts in the state. Mauganj, Pandhurna and Maihar are newly created districts. Two more new districts, Chachaura and Nagda, were approved by the state cabinet on 18 March 2020. These 55 districts are grouped into 10 administrative divisions. Districts are subdivided into tehsils, of which there are 428 in Madhya Pradesh. Each of these districts is administered by a collector-cum-district magistrate, an IAS officer appointed by the government. The districts are further divided into subdivisions and tehsils, under a Sub-Divisional Magistrate (SDM) and a Tehsildar, respectively.

== List of districts ==
There are 55 districts in Madhya Pradesh, categorized into ten divisions.

Sl No	District	Code	Headquarters	Division	Area (km^{2})	Population (2011)	Population density (per km^{2})	Location Map
1	Bhopal	BP	Bhopal	Bhopal	2,772	2,371,061	855	
2	Raisen	RS	Raisen	Bhopal	8,446	1,331,597	158	
3	Rajgarh	RG	Rajgarh	Bhopal	6,154	1,545,814	251	
4	Sehore	SR	Sehore	Bhopal	6,578	1,311,332	199	
5	Vidisha	VI	Vidisha	Bhopal	7,371	1,458,875	198	
6	Morena	MO	Morena	Chambal	4,991	1,965,970	394	
7	Bhind	BD	Bhind	Chambal	4,459	1,703,005	382	
8	Sheopur	SP	Sheopur	Chambal	6,585	687,861	104	
9	Gwalior	GW	Gwalior	Gwalior	5,214	2,032,036	390	
10	Ashoknagar	AS	Ashoknagar	Gwalior	4,674	845,071	181	
11	Datia	DT	Datia	Gwalior	2,038	786,754	386	
12	Guna	GU	Guna	Gwalior	6,485	1,241,519	191	
13	Shivpuri	SV	Shivpuri	Gwalior	10,278	1,726,050	168	
14	Indore	IN	Indore	Indore	3,898	3,276,697	841	
15	Alirajpur	AL	Alirajpur	Indore	3,182	728,999	229	
16	Barwani	BR	Barwani	Indore	5,432	1,385,881	255	
17	Burhanpur	BU	Burhanpur	Indore	2,473	757,847	306	
18	Dhar	DH	Dhar	Indore	8,153	2,185,793	268	
19	Jhabua	JH	Jhabua	Indore	6,782	1,025,048	151	
20	Khandwa	EN (Note: It was previously known as East Nimar)	Khandwa	Indore	4,927	1,310,061	262	
21	Khargone	WN (Note: It was previously known as West Nimar)	Khargone	Indore	4,927	1,873,046	262	
22	Jabalpur	JA	Jabalpur	Jabalpur	5,210	2,463,289	473	
23	Balaghat	BL	Balaghat	Jabalpur	9,229	1,701,698	184	
24	Chhindwara	CN	Chhindwara	Jabalpur	10,293	1,716,612	177	
25	Dindori	DI	Dindori	Jabalpur	7,427	704,524	95	
26	Katni	KA	Katni	Jabalpur	4,927	1,292,042	262	
27	Mandla	ML	Mandla	Jabalpur	5,805	1,054,905	182	
28	Narsinghpur	NA	Narsinghpur	Jabalpur	5,133	1,091,854	213	
29	Pandhurna	PD	Pandhurna	Jabalpur	1,522	374,310	246	
30	Seoni	SO	Seoni	Jabalpur	8,758	1,379,131	157	
31	Narmadapuram	NA	Narmadapuram	Narmadapuram	6,698	1,241,350	185	
32	Betul	BE	Betul	Narmadapuram	10,043	1,575,362	157	
33	Harda	HA	Harda	Narmadapuram	3,339	570,465	171	
34	Rewa	RE	Rewa	Rewa	6,434	1,748,461	368	
35	Maihar	MH	Maihar	Rewa	2,722.79	856,028	314	
36	Mauganj	MG	Mauganj	Rewa	1,866	616,645	331	
37	Satna	ST	Satna	Rewa	7,502	2,228,935	297	
38	Sidhi	SI	Sidhi	Rewa	4,851	1,127,033	230	
39	Singrauli	SH	Waidhan	Rewa	5,672	1,178,273	208	
40	Sagar	SG	Sagar	Sagar	10,252	2,378,458	232	
41	Chhatarpur	CT	Chhatarpur	Sagar	8,687	1,762,375	203	
42	Damoh	DM	Damoh	Sagar	7,306	1,264,219	173	
43	Niwari	NI	Niwari	Sagar	1,170	404,807	346	
44	Panna	PA	Panna	Sagar	7,135	1,016,520	142	
45	Tikamgarh	TI	Tikamgarh	Sagar	3,878	1,040,359	268	
46	Shahdol	SH	Shahdol	Shahdol	6,205	1,066,063	172	
47	Anuppur	AP	Anuppur	Shahdol	3,746	749,237	200	
48	Umaria	UM	Umaria	Shahdol	4,026	644,758	160	
49	Ujjain	UJ	Ujjain	Ujjain	6,091	1,986,864	326	
50	Agar Malwa	AG	Agar	Ujjain	2,785	571,275	205	
51	Dewas	DE	Dewas	Ujjain	7,020	1,563,715	223	
52	Mandsaur	MS	Mandsaur	Ujjain	5,530	1,340,411	242	
53	Neemuch	NE	Neemuch	Ujjain	4,267	826,067	194	
54	Ratlam	RL	Ratlam	Ujjain	4,861	1,455,069	299	
55	Shajapur	SJ	Shajapur	Ujjain	3,460	941,403	272	

== Proposals for new districts ==
Demands for the creation of new administrative districts in Madhya Pradesh are a recurring theme in the state's governance. During the 2023–24 state election campaigns, the government announced plans to elevate certain sub-divisions to full district status. Beyond official announcements, numerous regional movements led by local citizens, trade bodies, and elected representatives continue to seek administrative reorganization to address challenges related to extensive geographical travel times and dense populations.

List of Proposed Districts in Madhya Pradesh Grouped by Current District
Proposed District	Expected Area of Jurisdiction	Rationale / Status
Proposed from Bhind
Gohad	Gohad tehsil and adjacent northern blocks.	Proposed to improve governance access and decentralized utility delivery for the northernmost blocks of the district.
Proposed from Chhatarpur
Bijawar	Southern forested and tribal tracts of Chhatarpur district.	Demanded to bring administrative services closer to remote communities in the southern interior regions.
Laundi (Lavkush Nagar)	Laundi and surrounding northeastern blocks.	Local campaigns have sought district status for this border sub-division to mitigate geographic distances to the main district center.
Chandla	Chandla assembly constituency limits.	Proposed to optimize administrative focus near the Uttar Pradesh state border.
Proposed from Chhindwara
Junnardeo	Western mining and tribal blocks of Chhindwara.	Officially announced by the state government during the 2023–24 election period to help decentralize administration in the expansive Chhindwara district.
Proposed from Dewas
Bagli	Eastern tribal and hilly belt of Dewas district.	Long-standing demand to reduce travel times for the eastern forest tracts and expedite regional infrastructure projects.
Proposed from Dhar
Manawar	Southern agricultural blocks along the Narmada River.	Demanded by local trade and farming networks to establish a dedicated administrative hub distinct from Dhar town.
Proposed from Gwalior
Dabra	Southern agricultural and industrial blocks of Gwalior district.	Proposed to streamline municipal governance and public service delivery for this high-density trading center.
Proposed from Hoshangabad
Pipariya	Eastern blocks adjacent to the Pachmarhi biosphere reserve.	Proposed to manage the high seasonal influx of tourism and decentralize rural development planning.
Proposed from Jabalpur
Sihora	Northern mineral-rich belt of Jabalpur district.	Driven by prolonged civic agitations demanding distinct administrative infrastructure to manage the northern mining and rural blocks.
Proposed from Khargone
Barwaha	Northern commercial and industrial blocks of Khargone district.	Proposed to bridge the geographical distance imposed by the Narmada River separating the northern industrial belt from Khargone city.
Proposed from Mandsaur
Garoth	Eastern sub-divisions bordering Rajasthan.	Demanded to optimize public utility operations and border area management for towns distant from Mandsaur city.
Proposed from Narsinghpur
Gadarwara	Western industrial and power-generation hub of Narsinghpur.	Proposed to accommodate rapid demographic expansion and industrial development separate from the primary district core.
Proposed from Ratlam
Jaora	Northern sugar-industrial and agrarian blocks of Ratlam.	Long-standing regional proposal aimed at enhancing localized judicial and executive governance frameworks.
Proposed from Sagar
Bina	Northern industrial sector, including the Bina Refinery zone.	Proposed to independently manage specialized urban-industrial development separate from Sagar's rural segment operations.
Khurai	Northwestern agricultural blocks.	Demanded by local representations to establish streamlined administrative channels for western farming networks.
Shahgarh	Northeastern border fringes.	Proposed to alleviate administrative delivery bottlenecks in the remote northeastern frontier of the district.
Proposed from Satna
Chitrakoot	Holy town zone and adjacent border blocks sharing boundaries with Uttar Pradesh.	Proposed to focus administrative and planning resources on the cultural, pilgrim, and tourism traffic of the trans-border region.
Proposed from Seoni
Lakhnadon	Northern high-altitude tribal belt.	Demanded to tackle unique developmental and connectivity challenges across northern Seoni's interior blocks.
Proposed from Shahdol
Beohari	Northernmost blocks bordering Sidhi and Satna districts.	Proposed to decentralize administration from the southern district core and provide basic utilities closer to peripheral residents.
Proposed from Shivpuri
Pichhore	Eastern sub-divisions bordering Jhansi (Uttar Pradesh).	Officially announced by the state government during the 2023–24 election cycle to streamline border governance and enhance public service reach.
Proposed from Vidisha
Ganj Basoda	Central industrial and stone-quarrying blocks of Vidisha district.	Demanded to manage high population density and provide a distinct trading and transport hub administration.
Sironj	Northwestern enclave blocks.	Grounded in its historical status as an independent territory pre-reorganization, local movements demand its restoration as a full district to improve regional governance.

== Regions of Madhya Pradesh ==
Madhya Pradesh has various geographic regions which have no official administrative governmental status; some correspond to historic countries, states or provinces.

- Malwa - Indore, Ujjain, Dewas, Ratlam, Sehore, Rajgarh, Mandsaur, Shajapur, Dhar districts
- Nimar - Khandwa, Khargone, Burhanpur, Barwani, Jhabua districts
- Chambal-Gwalior - Bhind, Morena, Gwalior, Shivpuri, Guna, Sheopur, Ashoknagar districts
- Bundelkhand - Sagar, Panna, Damoh, Datia, Chhatarpur, Tikamgarh, Orchha districts
- Mahakaushal - Jabalpur, Chhindwara, Katni, Mandla, Seoni Balaghat, Pandhurna, Dindori districts
- Baghelkhand - Rewa, Satna, Sidhi, Maihar, Shahdol, Umariya, Anuppur, Singrauli, Mauganj districts
- Madhya Bharat - Bhopal, Vidisha, Raisen, Narmadapuram, Narsinghpur, Harda, Betul districts
