= Ujjain division =

- Division of Madhya Pradesh
- Map of Madhya Pradesh with Ujjain division highlighted in blue

- Location within Madhya Pradesh Location within India
- Coordinates (Ujjain): 23.17°N 75.79°E
- Country: India
- State: Madhya Pradesh
- Headquarters: Ujjain
- Districts: 7 (Dewas, Mandsaur, Neemuch, Ratlam, Shajapur, Agar and Ujjain)
- Time zone: UTC+05:30 (IST)
- Website: ujjaindivisionmp.nic.in

Ujjain Division is an administrative geographical unit of Madhya Pradesh state of India. Ujjain is the administrative headquarters of the division. As of 2005, the division consists of the districts of Dewas, Mandsaur, Neemuch, Ratlam, Shajapur, Agar Malwa and Ujjain.

== Major City's of Division ==
- Ujjain
- Dewas
- Ratlam
- Mandsaur
- Neemuch
- Nagda
- Jaora
- Shajapur
- Shujalpur
- Agar
