= Kannod =

- Town
- Location in Madhya Pradesh, India
- Coordinates: 22°39′58″N 76°44′13″E
- Country: India
- State: Madhya Pradesh
- District: Dewas
- Founder: Kanna Gond

Government
  - Type: Nagar panchayat
  - MLA: Ashish Sharma (BJP)
- Elevation: 355 m (1,165 ft)

Population (2011)
  - Total: 17,744

Languages
  - Official: Hindi
- Time zone: UTC+05:30 (IST)
- Postal code: 455332
- ISO 3166 code: IN-MP
- Vehicle registration: MP 41MP

Kannod is a town situated in Malwa region of Madhya Pradesh, India. It is surrounded by the Vindhya Range from three sides. It is well connected with Indore, Harda, Khandwa and Bhopal. Area code 07273

Major highway road National Highway 47 is passing through Kannod, it's connected it major cities. Kannod is well connected with nearby towns by daily bus services.

== Etymology ==
The ancient name of Kannod was Kannar which was adopted from the name of King Kanna. Kanna was the king of the Gond community.

== Geography ==
Kannod is located at 22°39′58″N 76°44′13″E. 455332 is pin code of Kannod.

== Demographics ==
As of the 2011 Census of India, Kannod had a population of 17,575. Males constitute 51.20% of the population and females 48.80%. Kannod has an average literacy rate of 63%, higher than the national average of 59.5%: male literacy is 72%, and female literacy is 53%. In Kannod, 15% of the population is under 6 years of age. Mr Ashish sharma is the current MLA

== Connectivity ==
=== Rail ===
Kannod has no rail connectivity. The nearest important railway station is Indore Junction railway station and Harda railway station.

=== Air ===
The nearest Airport is Devi Ahilyabai Holkar Airport, Indore.

== Climate ==
Climate data for Kannod (1981–2010, extremes 1969–2002)
Month	Jan	Feb	Mar	Apr	May	Jun	Jul	Aug	Sep	Oct	Nov	Dec	Year
Record high °C (°F)	33.1 (91.6)	39.8 (103.6)	43.1 (109.6)	46.1 (115.0)	47.1 (116.8)	47.6 (117.7)	42.1 (107.8)	39.2 (102.6)	38.0 (100.4)	39.6 (103.3)	40.2 (104.4)	34.1 (93.4)	47.6 (117.7)
Mean daily maximum °C (°F)	28.1 (82.6)	30.1 (86.2)	35.3 (95.5)	39.8 (103.6)	42.3 (108.1)	38.8 (101.8)	32.3 (90.1)	30.1 (86.2)	32.0 (89.6)	33.3 (91.9)	30.4 (86.7)	28.1 (82.6)	33.4 (92.1)
Mean daily minimum °C (°F)	11.2 (52.2)	12.7 (54.9)	17.7 (63.9)	23.0 (73.4)	25.7 (78.3)	24.2 (75.6)	22.2 (72.0)	21.6 (70.9)	21.0 (69.8)	17.8 (64.0)	12.9 (55.2)	10.1 (50.2)	18.3 (64.9)
Record low °C (°F)	1.1 (34.0)	3.1 (37.6)	6.1 (43.0)	11.6 (52.9)	11.6 (52.9)	8.1 (46.6)	10.0 (50.0)	7.1 (44.8)	9.1 (48.4)	5.1 (41.2)	4.1 (39.4)	1.4 (34.5)	1.1 (34.0)
Average rainfall mm (inches)	0.2 (0.01)	3.9 (0.15)	0.8 (0.03)	0.0 (0.0)	10.1 (0.40)	73.5 (2.89)	151.0 (5.94)	145.1 (5.71)	51.2 (2.02)	13.7 (0.54)	7.6 (0.30)	0.9 (0.04)	458.1 (18.04)
Average rainy days	0.3	0.2	0.0	0.0	0.8	3.5	7.7	7.3	2.7	0.9	0.4	0.1	23.7
Average relative humidity (%) (at 17:30 IST)	45	40	31	31	30	50	72	80	71	52	43	45	50
Source: India Meteorological Department
