= Dewas district =

- District of Madhya Pradesh
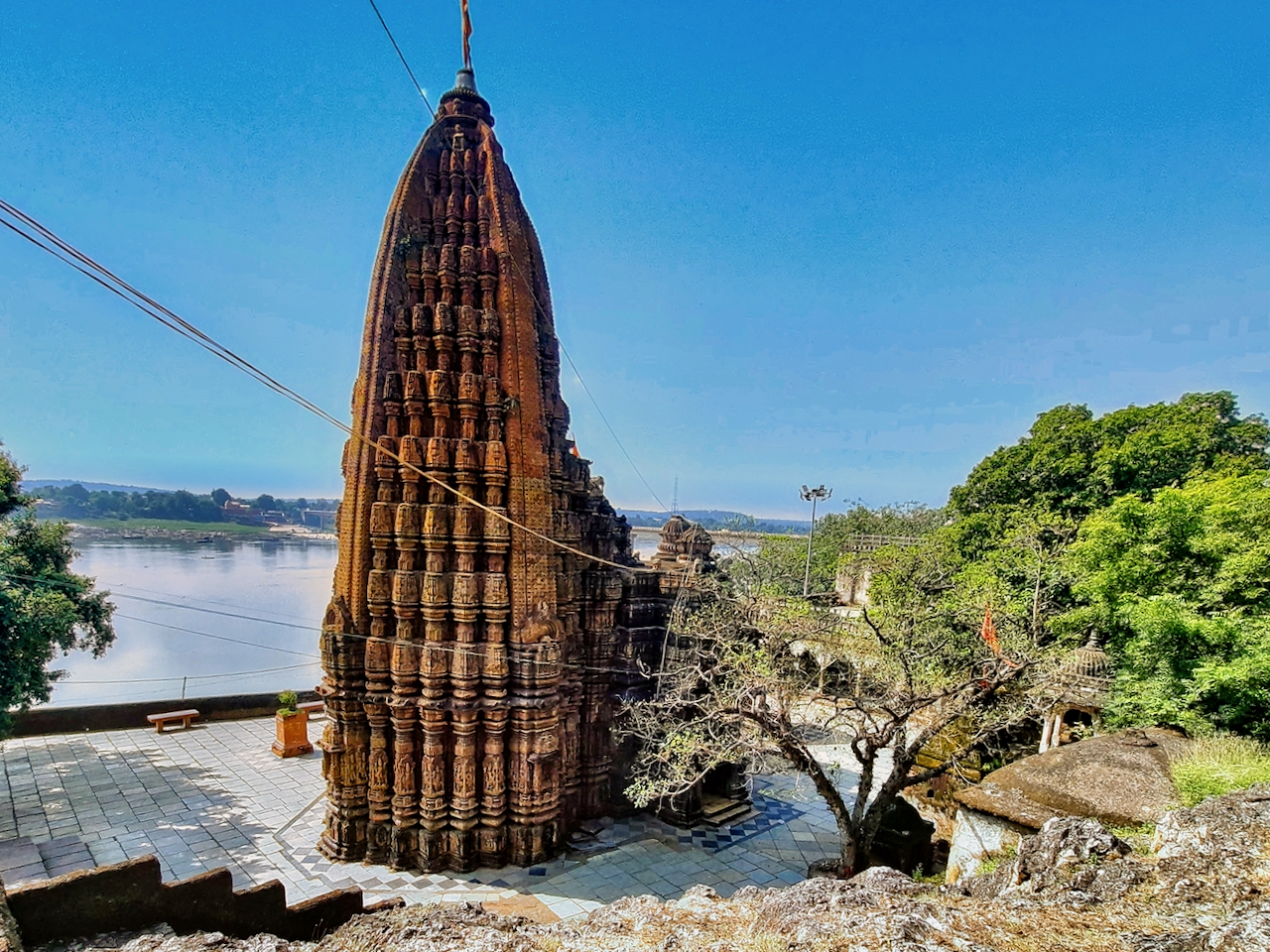
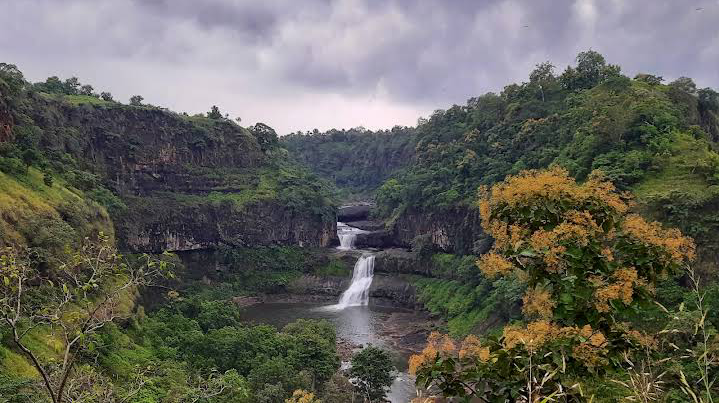
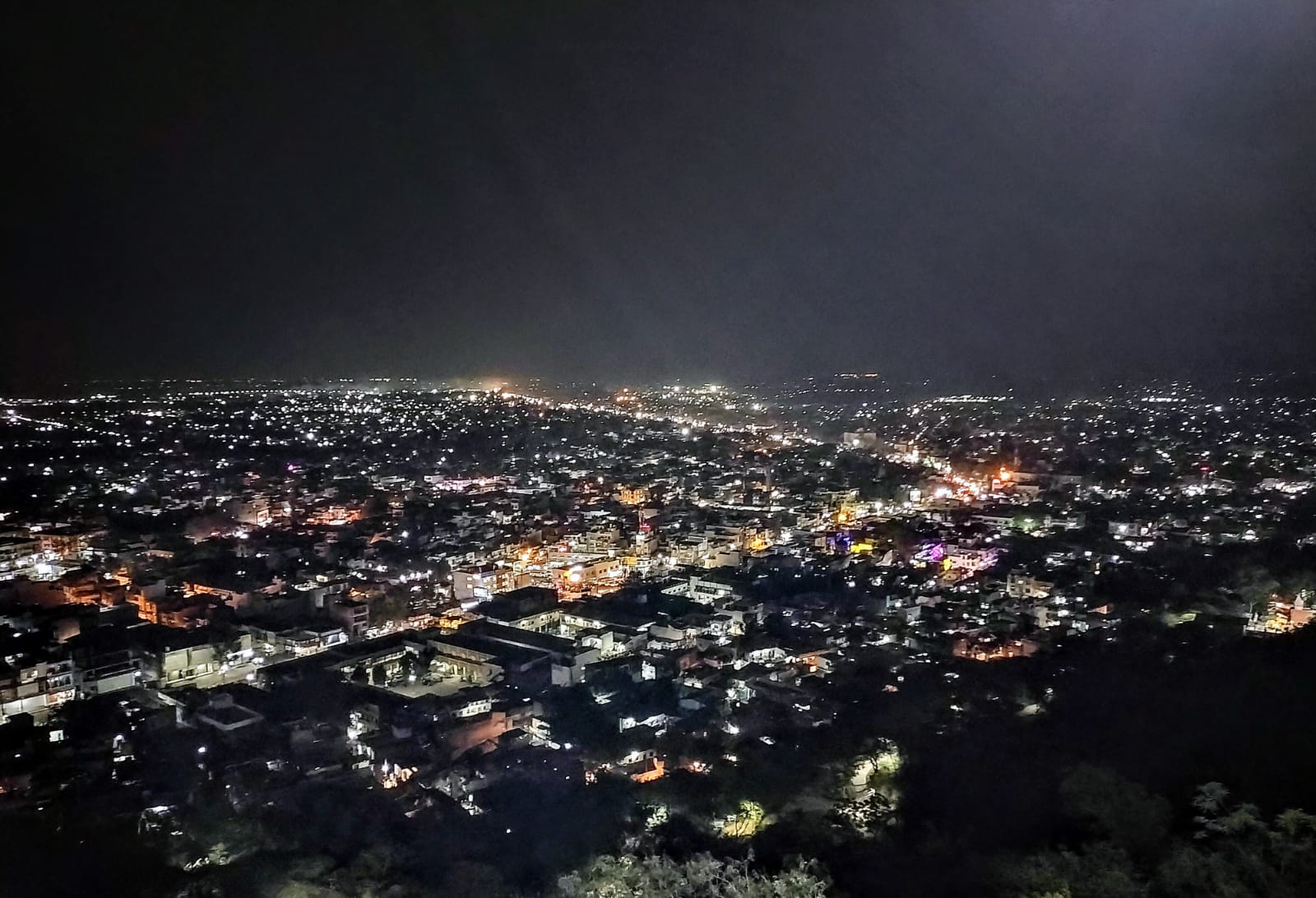
- Siddheshwar Mahadev Temple, Nemawar, Gidiya Khoh, Night view of Dewas City

- Location of Dewas district in Madhya Pradesh
- Country: India
- State: Madhya Pradesh
- Division: Ujjain
- Headquarters: Dewas
- Tehsils: 8 (Sonkatch, Dewas, Bagli, Kannod, Tonk Khurd, Khategaon, Hatpipliya and Satwas)

Area
  - Total: 7,020 km^{2} (2,710 sq mi)

Population (2011)
  - Total: 1,563,715
  - Density: 223/km^{2} (577/sq mi)

Demographics
  - Literacy: 70.53%
  - Sex ratio: 943:1000
- Time zone: UTC+05:30 (IST)
- Vehicle registration: MP 41
- Lok Sabha constituency: Dewas
- Vidhan Sabha constituencies: 5 (Dewas, Sonkatch, Hatpipliya, Bagli and Khategaon)
- Website: dewas.nic.in

Dewas district (Hindi pronunciation: [d̪eːʋaːs]) is a district in the Indian state of Madhya Pradesh. The town of Dewas is the district headquarters. It belongs to Ujjain Division.

The Dewas District roughly corresponds to the territories of the twin Maratha princely states of Dewas - Junior & Senior. The district straddles the Vindhya Range; the northern portion of the district lies on the Malwa plateau, while the southern portion lies in the valley of the Narmada River. The Narmada forms the southern boundary of the district. The district is bounded to the east by Sehore District, to the south by the Harda and Khandwa districts, to the west by the Khargone and Indore districts, and to the north by the Ujjain and Shajapur districts. Dewas District is part of Ujjain Division. Devsaal Rawats of Uttarakhand are said to have their origins in Dewas at the time of legendary king Vikramāditya. Dewas is about 152 kilometres (94 mi) from Bhopal and 40 kilometres (25 mi) from Indore by road.

== Etymology ==
The district takes its name from the district headquarters town, Dewas, which is said to have been derived on the basis of two traditions. One is that Dewas lies at the base of a 300-foot (91 m) conical hill, known as Chamunda hill, on top of which the shrine of Chamunda is located. The image of the goddess is cut into the wall of a cave, known as Devi Vashini or the goddess's residence. From this, the name Dewas (dev-vas) seems to have been derived. The other view of the probable origin is from the name of the founder of the city, Dewasa Bania.

== History ==
Dewas was formerly two separate Maratha princely states of British India (Dewas Junior) and (Dewas Senior). The original state was founded in the first half of the 18th century by the brothers - Jivaji Rao (Junior) and Tukaji Rao (Senior), from the Puar clan of Marathas. They had advanced into Malwa with the Maratha Peshwa, Baji Rao, in 1728. The brothers divided the territory among themselves and their descendants ruled as the senior and junior branches of the family. After 1841, each branch ruled its own portion as a separate state, though the lands belonging to each were intimately entangled. Both Dewas States were in the Malwa Agency of the Central India Agency.

Dewas Junior & Senior Darbars (Courts) were composed of Sardars, Mankaris, Istamuradars, Thakurs and Jagirdars.

After India's independence in 1947, the Rajas of Dewas acceded to India, and their states were integrated into Madhya Bharat, which became a state of India in 1950. Later, in 1956, Madhya Bharat was merged into Madhya Pradesh state.

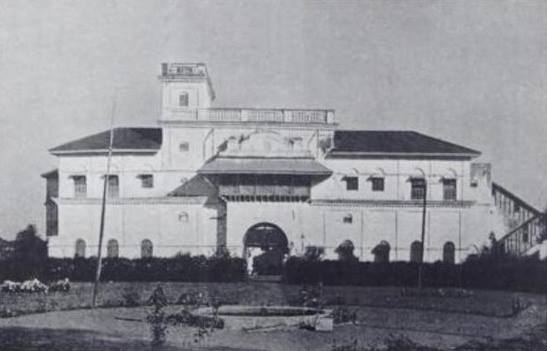
The Durga Bagh Palace, Dewas Junior State.

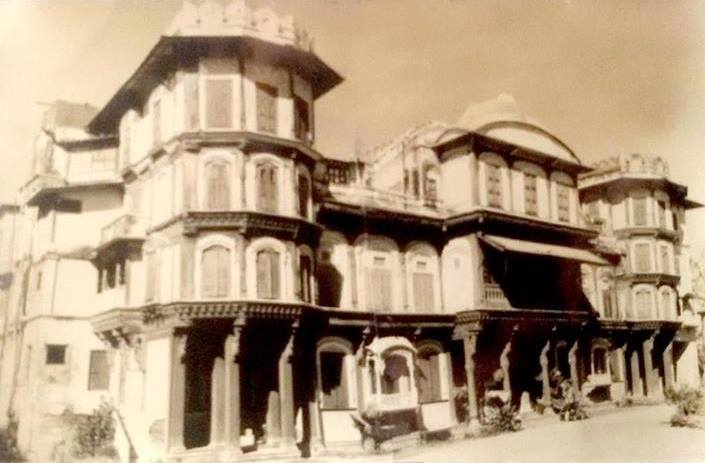
A rare photograph of the Old Palace (Rajwada) of Dewas Junior.

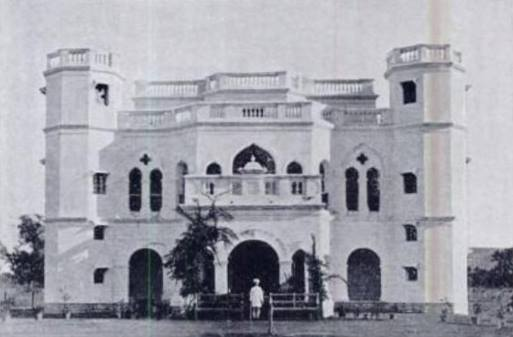
The Shree Lakshmi Narayan Bhawan Club, Dewas Junior State

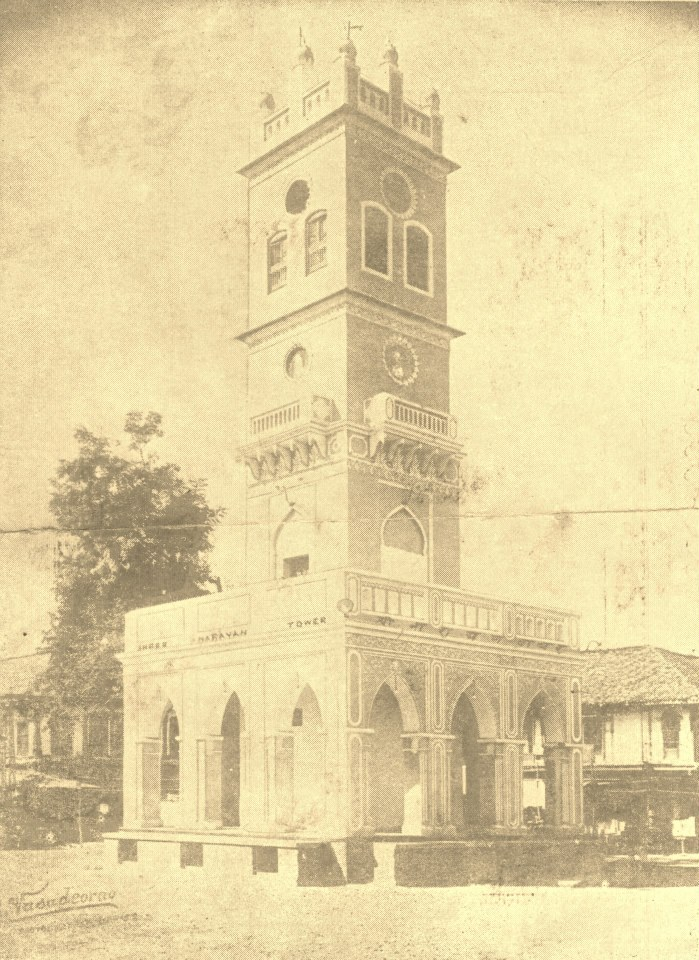
Shree Narayan Tower, Dewas Junior. The Clock Tower is named after HH Raja Srimant Narayanrao (Dada Sahib) Puar of Dewas (Junior).

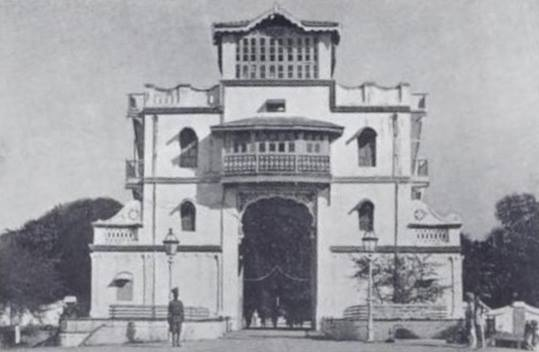
The Gate at Shree Malhar, The Residence of His Holiness Shri Shilnath Maharaj.

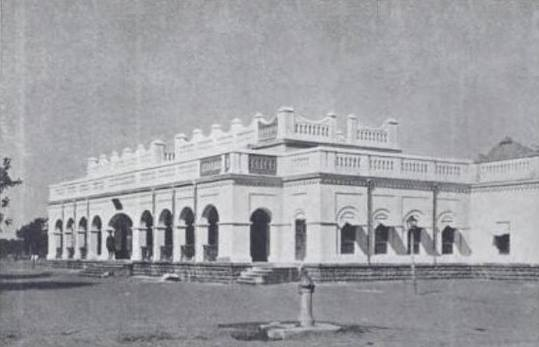
The Law Courts, Dewas Junior State.

== Geography ==
Dewas district lies in west Madhya Pradesh on the level plains of the Malwa plateau. To the south, the land rises gently to the Vindhya Range, which is the source of the Chambal and Kali Sindh rivers that flow north through the district on their way to the Ganges.

=== Climate ===
Due to its high elevation and inland location, even during the hottest months of the year, the nights are relatively cool, which is known as Shab-e-Malwa. Three distinct seasons are observed: summer, monsoon and winter. Dewas gets most of its rainfall during July–September due to the southwest monsoon.

Climate data for Dewas
Month	Jan	Feb	Mar	Apr	May	Jun	Jul	Aug	Sep	Oct	Nov	Dec	Year
Record high °C (°F)	26.5 (79.7)	29.3 (84.7)	34 (93)	38.1 (100.6)	40.4 (104.7)	36.3 (97.3)	29.7 (85.5)	28.5 (83.3)	29.7 (85.5)	31.7 (89.1)	29.3 (84.7)	27.1 (80.8)	40.4 (104.7)
Daily mean °C (°F)	18.3 (64.9)	20.5 (68.9)	25.1 (77.2)	29.7 (85.5)	33 (91)	30.6 (87.1)	26.3 (79.3)	25.4 (77.7)	25.6 (78.1)	24.7 (76.5)	21 (70)	18.7 (65.7)	24.9 (76.8)
Record low °C (°F)	10.2 (50.4)	11.8 (53.2)	16.2 (61.2)	21.3 (70.3)	25.6 (78.1)	24.9 (76.8)	22.9 (73.2)	22.3 (72.1)	21.5 (70.7)	17.7 (63.9)	12.7 (54.9)	10.4 (50.7)	10.2 (50.4)
Average rainfall mm (inches)	9 (0.4)	2 (0.1)	7 (0.3)	3 (0.1)	7 (0.3)	122 (4.8)	327 (12.9)	274 (10.8)	240 (9.4)	30 (1.2)	13 (0.5)	5 (0.2)	1,039 (41)
Source: climate-data.org

== Places of interest ==
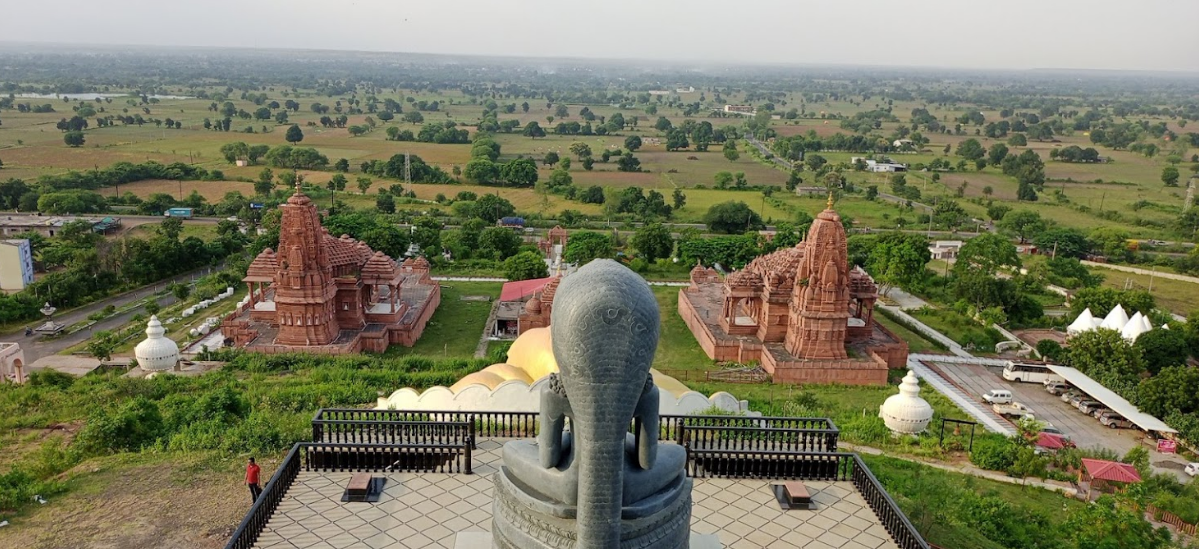
Pushpgiri Tirth, Sonkatch, Dewas

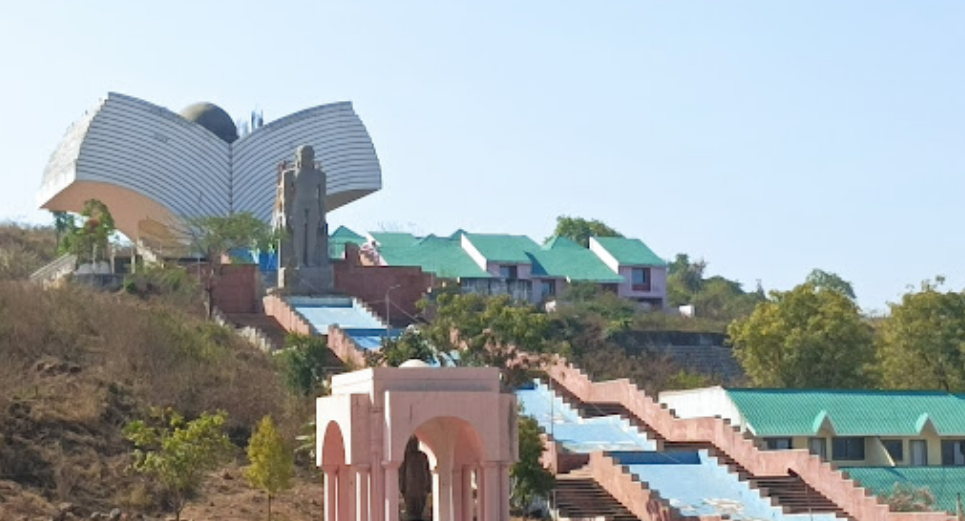
Pushpgiri Jain Tirth, Sonkatch, Dewas

=== Pushpgiri Tirth, Sonkatch ===
Shri Digambar Jain Teerth Kshetra, Pushpagiri is located 4 km (2.5 mi) west of Sonkatch, in the area of the Songiri Hills. The temple here is dedicated to Lord Mahavir. This Jain kshetra is a sprawling 250-acre complex housing Jain Sthanaks, schools, hospital, museum, cottages, shopping center and a 108-foot-tall (33 m) idol of Bhagwan Paraswanath in a Yogic (Padmasan) posture, one of the tallest Jain idols.

=== Kheoni wildlife Sanctuary ===
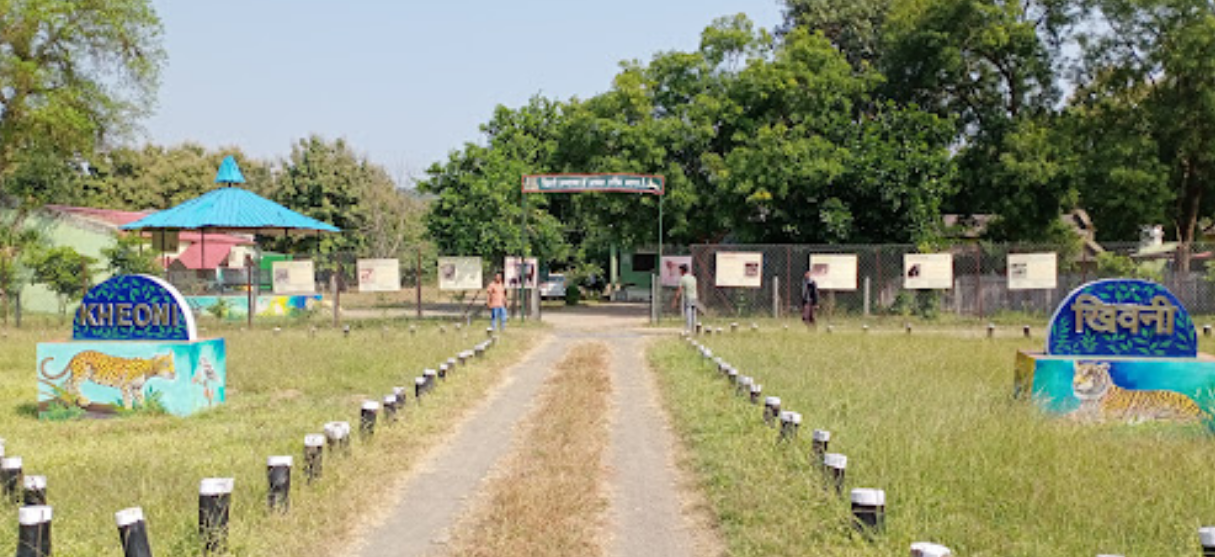
Kheoni Wildlife Sanctuary Area, Dewas

Kheoni Wildlife Sanctuary straddles Kannod tehsil of Dewas district and Sehore district It is spread over an area of 132 square kilometres (51 sq mi). According to a bird survey done in April 2018, Kheoni has around 125 species of birds, including the state bird of Madhya Pradesh, the Indian paradise flycatcher.

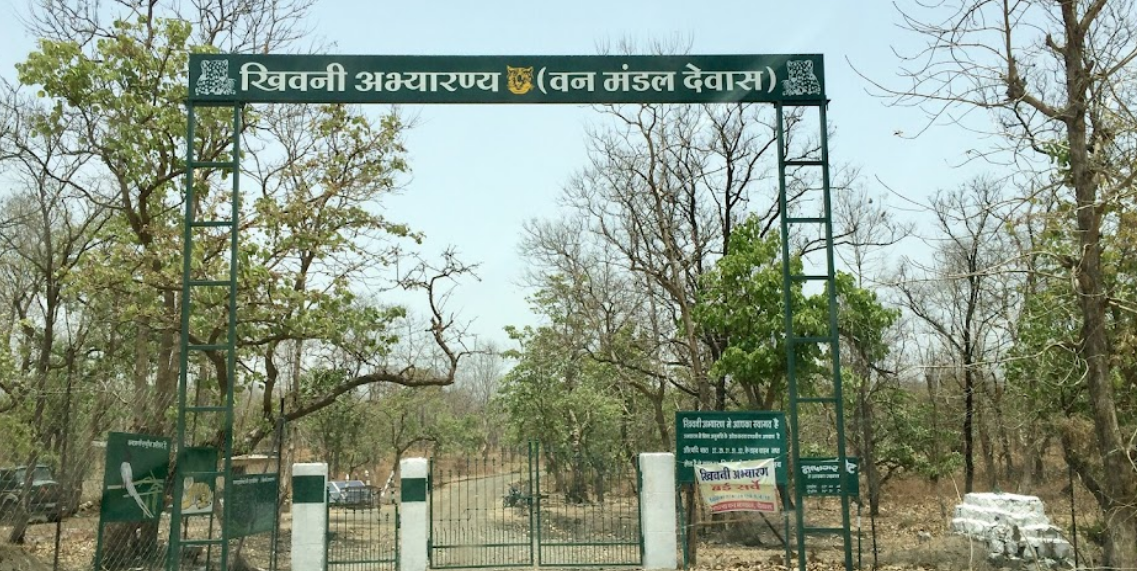
Kheoni Wildlife Sanctuary, Dewas

=== Nemawar ===
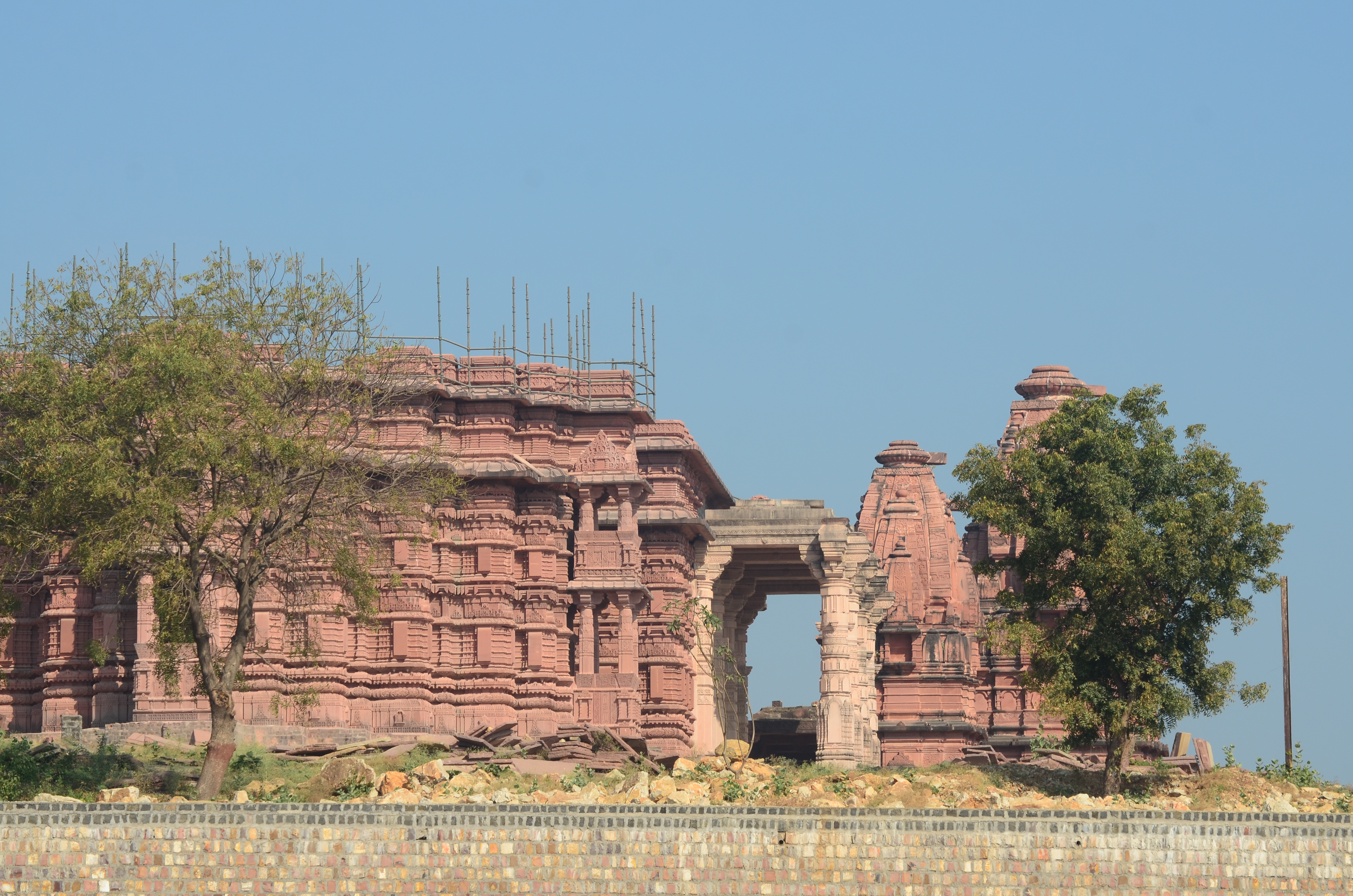
Jain Mandir, Nemawar

Nemawar is a small town located banks of Narmada River, here is many significance places like - Siddheshwar Mahadev Temple, Nabhi Kund, Digambar Jain Mandir, Ma Renuka Mandir ets.

=== Kavadia Hills ===
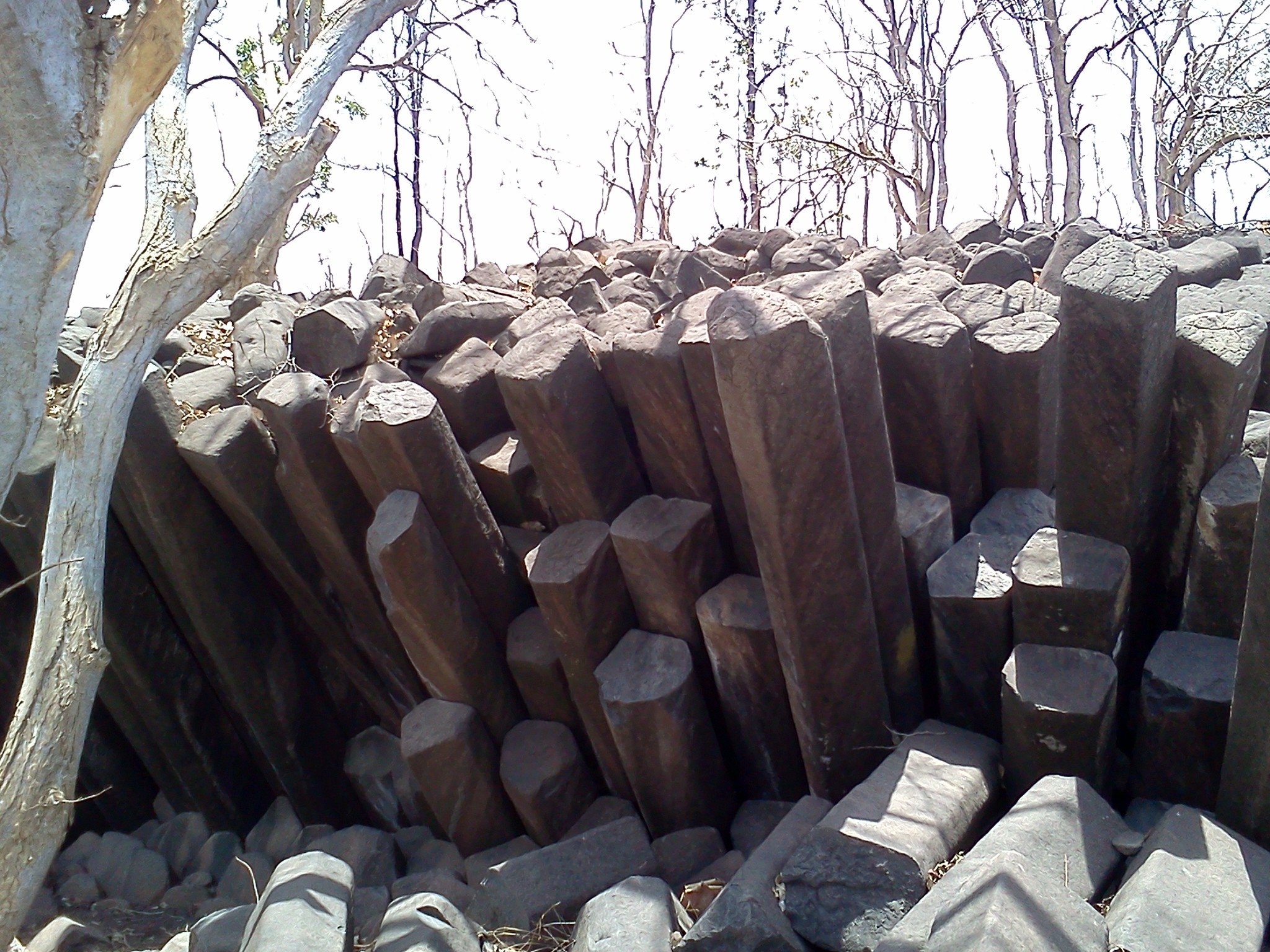
Basaltic columns at Kavadia hills

These are a series of hills, situated next to Potla and Pipri villages in Bagli Taluk of Dewas district. There are a total of seven mountain-like formations of shaped, interlocking, basalt columns that were probably created simultaneously as a result of volcanic eruption millions of years ago. These rock columns are arranged in a pattern that gives an appearance of a man-made structure. Most of the columns are hexagonal and interlocked with similar rocks on all the edges that emit a musical sound when struck. Most visible columns are 8 to 10 feet long but there can be longer rocks further deep inside the mountain. Although basalt columns are not unique and are found at several places around the world (including St. Mary's Islands in Karnataka, India), the quality, quantity, geometrical arrangement and location (far from an ocean) of this place is unique.

=== Gidiya Khoh ===
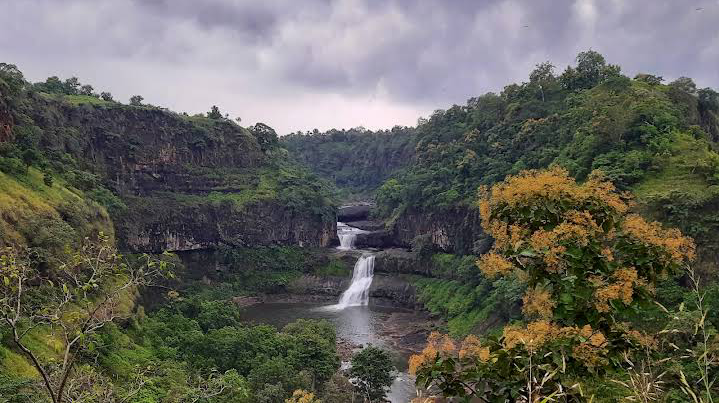
Gidiya Khoh

Situated on the Indore-Nemawar road, Gidya Khoh or Gidiya Khoh lies in the Dewas District, and has a waterfall surrounded by a valley. The waterfall cascades from a height of 500–600 ft. Khudel devta temple is located here. Gidya Khoh is located about 48 kilometres (30 mi) south of Dewas and 42 km east of Indore.

=== Other ===
- Pawar Chhatries
- Chamunda Tekri
- Mahadev Temple (Shankar Garh)
- Kela Devi Temple, Dewas
- Dharaji
- Shree Siddhi Vinayak Ganesh Temple, Nagda

== Dewas' water management programs ==
The United Nations awarded Dewas district's community water management works the 3rd place under the category of "Best Water Management Practices" for 2011–2012. The United Nations also praised Bhagirath Krishhak Abhiyan of Dewas district, started by district administrator Umakant Umrao. A documentary film made by Public Service Broadcasting Trust about Dewas water revolution was featured on Lok Sabha TV.

== Divisions ==
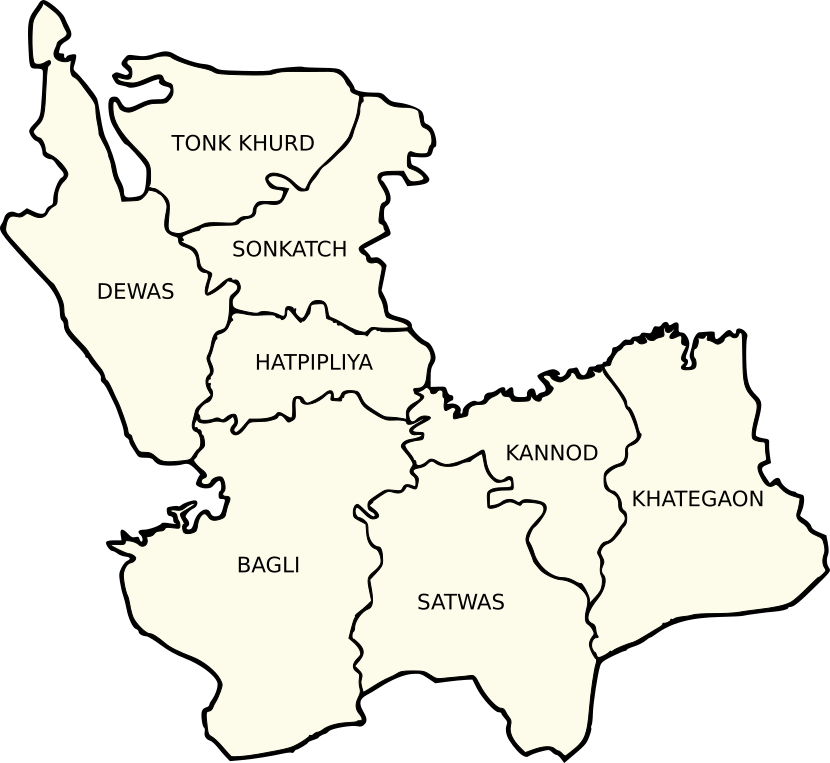
Tehsils of Dewas district

Dewas District is divided into nine tehsils:

1. Sonkatch,
2. Dewas,
3. Bagli,
4. Kannod,
5. Tonk Khurd,
6. Khategaon,
7. Hatpipliya
8. Satwas
9. Udainagar .

Dewas tehsil is situated on the north-western part of the district, Sonkatch on the north-eastern part, Bagli on the south, Kannod on the south-central part and Khategaon on the South-east. Dewas, the headquarters of Dewas tehsil, and the district headquarters, is situated on National Highway and is also connected by broad-gauge railway line of western Railway.

The district contributes 5 seats to the Madhya Pradesh Vidhan Sabha: Dewas, Sonkatch, Hatpipliya, Bagli and Khategaon.

Dewas is also spread across 3 Lok Sabha constituencies: Dewas (Sonkatch, Dewas, Tonk Khurd and Hatpipliya tehsils), Khandwa (Bagli and Satwas tehsils) and Vidisha (Khategoan and Kannod tehsils)

== Transport ==
In terms of roadways, NH-47 passes through the southern parts of the district and NH-52 passes through Dewas city. In addition, there are State Highways and other district highways within the district. The district has 3 railway stations, of which Dewas Junction (DWX), gets the most passenger traffic. It is a part of Ratlam Division of the Western Railway Zone.

== Demographics ==
Historical population

Year	Pop.	±% p.a.
1901	228,938	—
1911	274,986	+1.85%
1921	268,396	−0.24%
1931	306,975	+1.35%
1941	326,221	+0.61%
1951	345,306	+0.57%

Year	Pop.	±% p.a.
1961	446,901	+2.61%
1971	594,336	+2.89%
1981	795,309	+2.96%
1991	1,033,807	+2.66%
2001	1,308,223	+2.38%
2011	1,563,715	+1.80%

Religions in Dewas district (2011): Religion / Percent; Hinduism / 88.03%; Islam / 11.14%; Jainism / 0.42%; Other or not stated / 0.41%

According to the 2011 census Dewas District has a population of 1,563,715, roughly equal to the nation of Gabon or the US state of Hawaii. This gives it a ranking of 319th in India (out of a total of 640). The district has a population density of 223 inhabitants per square kilometre (580/sq mi). Its population growth rate over the decade 2001-2011 was 19.48%. Dewas has a sex ratio of 941 females for every 1000 males, and a literacy rate of 70.53%. 28.89% of the population lives in urban areas. Scheduled Castes and Scheduled Tribes make up 18.67% and 17.44% of the population respectively.

=== Languages ===
Languages of Dewas district (2011)
1. Hindi (55.5%)
2. Malvi (32.7%)
3. Nimadi (3.10%)
4. Urdu (1.90%)
5. Gondi (1.31%)
6. Bareli (1.08%)
7. Bhili (0.91%)
8. Others (3.46%)

As of the 2011 census, 55.51% of the population in the district spoke Hindi, 32.73% Malvi, 3.10% Nimadi, 1.90% Urdu, 1.31% Gondi, 1.08% Bareli, and 0.91% Bhili as their first language.
