= List of tehsils of Madhya Pradesh =

List of administrative divisions of Madhya Pradesh, India

The Indian state of Madhya Pradesh is divided into 55 districts, which are further divided into 428 tehsils, or subdistricts.

As an entity of local government, the tehsil office exercises certain fiscal and administrative power over the villages and municipalities within its jurisdiction. It is the ultimate executive agency for land records and related administrative matters. The chief official is called the tehsildar. In some instances, tehsils overlap with "blocks" (panchayat union blocks or panchayat development blocks) and come under the land and revenue department, headed by tehsildar; and blocks come under the rural development department, headed by the block development officer and serve different government administrative functions over the same or similar geographical area.

Mauganj, Maihar and Pandhurna are the newest district of Madhya Pradesh which were separated from Rewa Satna and Chhindwara in 2023 by Madhya Pradesh, chief minister shivraj singh chauhan

Districts of Madhya Pradesh

== List of Tehsils ==
Name	Headquarters	District	Division
Huzur	Bhopal	Bhopal	Bhopal division
Kolar	Kolar	Bhopal	Bhopal division
Berasia	Berasia	Bhopal	Bhopal division
Raisen	Raisen	Raisen	Bhopal division
Goharganj	Goharganj	Raisen	Bhopal division
Begamganj	Begamganj	Raisen	Bhopal division
Gairatganj	Gairatganj	Raisen	Bhopal division
Silwani	Silwani	Raisen	Bhopal division
Barely	Bareli	Raisen	Bhopal division
Badi	Badi	Raisen	Bhopal division
Udaipura	Udaipura	Raisen	Bhopal division
Sultanpur	Sultanpur	Raisen	Bhopal division
Rajgarh	Rajgarh	Rajgarh	Bhopal division
Khilchipur	Khilchipur	Rajgarh	Bhopal division
Zirapur	Zirapur	Rajgarh	Bhopal division
Biaora	Biaora	Rajgarh	Bhopal division
Narsinghgarh	Narsinghgarh	Rajgarh	Bhopal division
Sarangpur	Sarangpur	Rajgarh	Bhopal division
Pachore	Pachore	Rajgarh	Bhopal division
Khujner	Khujner	Rajgarh	Bhopal division
Suthaliya	Suthaliya	Rajgarh	Bhopal division
Sehore (Urban)	Sehore	Sehore	Bhopal division
Sehore (Rural)	Sehore	Sehore	Bhopal division
Shyampur	Shyampur	Sehore	Bhopal division
Ashta	Ashta	Sehore	Bhopal division
Jawar	Jawar	Sehore	Bhopal division
Ichhawar	Ichhawar	Sehore	Bhopal division
Nasrullaganj	Nasrullaganj	Sehore	Bhopal division
Budhni	Budhni	Sehore	Bhopal division
Rehti	Rehti	Sehore	Bhopal division
Vidisha Urban	Vidisha	Vidisha	Bhopal division
Vidisha Rural	Vidisha	Vidisha	Bhopal division
Ganj Basoda	Ganj Basoda	Vidisha	Bhopal division
Gyaraspur	Gyaraspur	Vidisha	Bhopal division
Kurwai	Kurwai	Vidisha	Bhopal division
Lateri	Lateri	Vidisha	Bhopal division
Nateran	Nateran	Vidisha	Bhopal division
Sironj	Sironj	Vidisha	Bhopal division
Gulabganj	Gulabganj	Vidisha	Bhopal division
Pathari	Pathari	Vidisha	Bhopal division
Shamshabad	Shamshabad	Vidisha	Bhopal division
Tyonda	Tyonda	Vidisha	Bhopal division
Morena Urban	Morena	Morena	Chambal division
Morena Rural	Morena	Morena	Chambal division
Bamor	Bamor	Morena	Chambal division
Ambah	Ambah	Morena	Chambal division
Porsa	Porsa	Morena	Chambal division
Joura	Joura	Morena	Chambal division
Sabalgarh	Sabalgarh	Morena	Chambal division
Kailaras	Kailaras	Morena	Chambal division
Sheopur	Sheopur	Sheopur	Chambal division
Badoda	Badoda	Sheopur	Chambal division
Karahal	Karahal	Sheopur	Chambal division
Vijaypur	Vijaypur	Sheopur	Chambal division
Birpur	Birpur	Sheopur	Chambal division
Bhind	Bhind	Bhind	Chambal division
Ater	Ater	Bhind	Chambal division
Lahar	Lahar	Bhind	Chambal division
Mehgaon	Mehgaon	Bhind	Chambal division
Mau	Mau	Bhind	Chambal division
Roun	Roun	Bhind	Chambal division
Mihona	Mihona	Bhind	Chambal division
Gohad	Gohad	Bhind	Chambal division
Gormi	Gormi	Bhind	Chambal division
Gwalior	Gwalior	Gwalior	Gwalior division
Dabra	Dabra	Gwalior	Gwalior division
Bhitarwar	Bhitarwar	Gwalior	Gwalior division
Chinore	Chinore	Gwalior	Gwalior division
Ghatigaon	Ghatigaon	Gwalior	Gwalior division
Tansen	Tansen	Gwalior	Gwalior division
Murar	Murar	Gwalior	Gwalior division
City Centre	City Centre	Gwalior	Gwalior division
Ashoknagar	Ashoknagar	Ashoknagar	Gwalior division
Chanderi	Chanderi	Ashoknagar	Gwalior division
Isagarh	Isagarh	Ashoknagar	Gwalior division
Mungaoli	Mungaoli	Ashoknagar	Gwalior division
Nai Sarai	Nai Sarai	Ashoknagar	Gwalior division
Piparai	Piparai	Ashoknagar	Gwalior division
Shadora	Shadora	Ashoknagar	Gwalior division
Shivpuri	Shivpuri	Shivpuri	Gwalior division
Pohari	Pohari	Shivpuri	Gwalior division
Bairad	Bairad	Shivpuri	Gwalior division
Kolaras	Kolaras	Shivpuri	Gwalior division
Badarwas	Badarwas	Shivpuri	Gwalior division
Pichhore	Pichhore	Shivpuri	Gwalior division
Khaniadhana	Khaniadhana	Shivpuri	Gwalior division
Karera	Karera	Shivpuri	Gwalior division
Narwar	Narwar	Shivpuri	Gwalior division
Datia	Datia	Datia	Gwalior division
Badoni	Badoni	Datia	Gwalior division
Seondha	Seondha	Datia	Gwalior division
Indergarh	Indergarh	Datia	Gwalior division
Bhander	Bhander	Datia	Gwalior division
Guna	Guna	Guna	Gwalior division
Aron	Aron	Guna	Gwalior division
Raghogarh	Raghogarh	Guna	Gwalior division
Chachaura	Chachoura	Guna	Gwalior division
Bamori	Bamori	Guna	Gwalior division
Maksudangarh	Maksudangarh	Guna	Gwalior division
Kumbhraj	Kumbhraj	Guna	Gwalior division
Alirajpur	Alirajpur	Alirajpur	Indore division
Jobat	Jobat	Alirajpur	Indore division
Sondwa	Sondwa	Alirajpur	Indore division
Bhavra	Bhavra	Alirajpur	Indore division
Katthiwada	Katthiwada	Alirajpur	Indore division
Barwani	Barwani	Barwani	Indore division
Pati	Pati	Barwani	Indore division
Sendhwa	Sendhwa	Barwani	Indore division
Warla	Warla	Barwani	Indore division
Anjad	Anjad	Barwani	Indore division
Rajpur	Rajpur	Barwani	Indore division
Thikri	Thikri	Barwani	Indore division
Niwali	Niwali	Barwani	Indore division
Pansemal	Pansemal	Barwani	Indore division
Burhanpur	Burhanpur	Burhanpur	Indore division
Khaknar	Khaknar	Burhanpur	Indore division
Nepanagar	Nepanagar	Burhanpur	Indore division
Old Indore	Indore	Indore	Indore division
Kanadiya	Kanadiya	Indore	Indore division
Bicholi Hapsi	Bicholi Hapsi	Indore	Indore division
Malharganj	Malharganj	Indore	Indore division
Khudail	Khudail	Indore	Indore division
Rau	Rau	Indore	Indore division
Dr. Ambedkar Nagar	Dr. Ambedkar Nagar	Indore	Indore division
Sanwer	Sanwer	Indore	Indore division
Depalpur	Depalpur	Indore	Indore division
Hatod	Hatod	Indore	Indore division
Dhar	Dhar	Dhar	Indore division
Badnawar	Badnawar	Dhar	Indore division
Kukshi	Kukshi	Dhar	Indore division
Manawar	Manawar	Dhar	Indore division
Gadwani	Gandhwani	Dhar	Indore division
Dahi	Dahi	Dhar	Indore division
Dharmapuri	Dharmapuri	Dhar	Indore division
Sardarpur	Sardarpur	Dhar	Indore division
Pithampur	Pithampur	Dhar	Indore division
Jhabua	Jhabua	Jhabua	Indore division
Ranapur	Ranapur	Jhabua	Indore division
Thandla	Thandla	Jhabua	Indore division
Petlavad	Petlawad	Jhabua	Indore division
Meghnagar	Meghnagar	Jhabua	Indore division
Rama	Ramanagar	Jhabua	Indore division
Khandwa	Khandwa	Khandwa	Indore division
Pandhana	Pandhana	Khandwa	Indore division
Mundi	Mundi	Khandwa	Indore division
Punasa	Punasa	Khandwa	Indore division
Harsud	Harsud	Khandwa	Indore division
Khalwa	Khalwa		Indore division
Khargone	Lonara	Khargone	Indore division
Khargone Nagar	Khargone	Khargone	Indore division
Kasrawad	Kasrawad	Khargone	Indore division
Maheshwar	Maheshwar	Khargone	Indore division
Badwah	Badwah	Khargone	Indore division
Sanawad	Sanawad	Khargone	Indore division
Gogawaan	Gogawaan	Khargone	Indore division
Bhikangaon	Bhikangaon	Khargone	Indore division
Jhirniya	Jhirniya	Khargone	Indore division
Bhagwanpura	Bhagwanpura	Khargone	Indore division
Segaon	Segaon	Khargone	
Balaghat	Balaghat	Balaghat	Jabalpur division
Baihar	Baihar	Balaghat	Jabalpur division
Birsa	Birsa	Balaghat	Jabalpur division
Katangi	Katangi	Balaghat	Jabalpur division
Khairlanji	Khairlanji	Balaghat	Jabalpur division
Kirnapur	Kirnapur	Balaghat	Jabalpur division
Lalbarra	Lalbarra	Balaghat	Jabalpur division
Lanji	Lanji	Balaghat	Jabalpur division
Paraswada	Paraswada	Balaghat	Jabalpur division
Waraseoni	Waraseoni	Balaghat	Jabalpur division
Chhindwara	Chhindwara	Chhindwara	Jabalpur division
Chhindwara Nagar	Chhindwara Nagar	Chhindwara	Jabalpur division
Parsia	Parsia	Chhindwara	Jabalpur division
Chaurai	Chaurai	Chhindwara	Jabalpur division
Junnardeo	Junnardeo	Chhindwara	Jabalpur division
Sauser	Sauser	Chhindwara	Jabalpur division
Pandurna	Pandurna	Chhindwara	Jabalpur division
Amarwada	Amarwada	Chhindwara	Jabalpur division
Harrai	Harrai	Chhindwara	Jabalpur division
Tamiya	Tamiya	Chhindwara	Jabalpur division
Mohkhed	Mohkhed	Chhindwara	Jabalpur division
Bichua	Bichua	Chhindwara	Jabalpur division
Umreth	Umreth	Chhindwara	Jabalpur division
Chand	Chand	Chhindwara	Jabalpur division
Jabalpur	Jabalpur	Jabalpur	Jabalpur division
Kundam	Kundam	Jabalpur	Jabalpur division
Majoli	Majoli	Jabalpur	Jabalpur division
Patan	Patan	Jabalpur	Jabalpur division
Panagar	Panagar	Jabalpur	Jabalpur division
Sihora	Sihora	Jabalpur	Jabalpur division
Shahpura	Shahpura	Jabalpur	Jabalpur division
Adhartal	Adhartal	Jabalpur	Jabalpur division
Ranjhi	Ranjhi	Jabalpur	Jabalpur division
Gorakhpur	Gorakhpur	Jabalpur	Jabalpur division
Katni	Katni	Katni	Jabalpur division
Katni Rural	Katni	Katni	Jabalpur division
Reethi	Reethi	Katni	Jabalpur division
Badwara	Badwara	Katni	Jabalpur division
Bahoriband	Bahoriband	Katni	Jabalpur division
Vijayraghavgarh	Vijayraghavgarh	Katni	Jabalpur division
Dhimarkheda	Dhimarkheda	Katni	Jabalpur division
Barhi	Barhi	Katni	Jabalpur division
Mandla	Mandla	Mandla	Jabalpur division
Nainpur	Nainpur	Mandla	Jabalpur division
Bichiya	Bichhiya	Mandla	Jabalpur division
Ghughri	Ghughri	Mandla	Jabalpur division
Nivas	Niwas	Mandla	Jabalpur division
Narayanganj	Narayanganj	Mandla	Jabalpur division
Narsinghpur	Narsinghpur	Narsinghpur	Jabalpur division
Gadarwara	Gadarwara	Narsinghpur	Jabalpur division
Gotegaon	Gotegaon	Narsinghpur	Jabalpur division
Tendukheda	Tendukheda	Narsinghpur	Jabalpur division
Kareli	Kareli	Narsinghpur	Jabalpur division
Sainkheda	Sainkheda	Narsinghpur	Jabalpur division
Seoni	Seoni	Seoni	Jabalpur division
Barghat	Barghat	Seoni	Jabalpur division
Chhapra	Chhapra	Seoni	Jabalpur division
Dhanora	Dhanora	Seoni	Jabalpur division
Ghansor	Ghansor	Seoni	Jabalpur division
Kevlari	Keolari	Seoni	Jabalpur division
Kurai	Kurai	Seoni	Jabalpur division
Lakhanadon	Lakhanadon	Seoni	Jabalpur division
Seoni Gramin	Seoni	Seoni	Jabalpur division
Dindori	Dindori	Dindori	Jabalpur division
Shahpura	Shahpura	Dindori	Jabalpur division
Bajag	Bajag	Dindori	Jabalpur division
Betul	Betul	Betul	Narmadapuram division
Multai	Multai	Betul	Narmadapuram division
Amla	Amla	Betul	Narmadapuram division
Bhainsdehi	Bhainsdehi	Betul	Narmadapuram division
Athner	Athner	Betul	Narmadapuram division
Shahpur	Shahpur	Betul	Narmadapuram division
Ghodadongri	Ghodadongri	Betul	Narmadapuram division
Chicholi	Chicholi	Betul	Narmadapuram division
Bhimpur	Bhimpur	Betul	Narmadapuram division
Prabhat Pattan	Prabhat Pattan	Betul	Narmadapuram division
Harda	Harda	Harda	Narmadapuram division
Handia	Handia	Harda	Narmadapuram division
Timarni	Timarni	Harda	Narmadapuram division
Rahatgaon	Rahatgaon	Harda	Narmadapuram division
Khirkiya	Khirkiya	Harda	Narmadapuram division
Sirali	Sirali	Harda	Narmadapuram division
Narmadapuram	Narmadapuram	Narmadapuram	Narmadapuram division
Itarsi	Itarsi	Narmadapuram	Narmadapuram division
Doleria	Doleria	Narmadapuram	Narmadapuram division
Seoni Malwa	Seoni Malwa	Narmadapuram	Narmadapuram division
Makhan Nagar	Makhan Nagar	Narmadapuram	Narmadapuram division
Sohagpur	Sohagpur	Narmadapuram	Narmadapuram division
Pipariya	Pipariya	Narmadapuram	Narmadapuram division
Bankhedi	Bankhedi	Narmadapuram	Narmadapuram division
Huzoor Rural	Rewa	Rewa	Rewa division
Huzoor Urban	Rewa	Rewa	Rewa division
Mauganj	Mauganj	Rewa	Rewa division
Hanumana	Hanumana	Rewa	Rewa division
Nai Garhi	Nai Garhi	Rewa	Rewa division
Jawa	Jawa	Rewa	Rewa division
Teonthar	Teonthar	Rewa	Rewa division
Raipur Kurchulian	Raipur Kurchulian	Rewa	Rewa division
Gurh	Gurh	Rewa	Rewa division
Sirmaur	Sirmaur	Rewa	Rewa division
Semaria	Semaria	Rewa	Rewa division
Mangawan	Mangawan	Rewa	Rewa division
Raghurajnagar Rural	Satna	Satna	Rewa division
Raghurajnagar Urban	Satna	Satna	Rewa division
Amapatan	Amapatan	Satna	Rewa division
Maihar	Maihar	Satna	Rewa division
Majhgawan	Majhgawan	Satna	Rewa division
Nagod	Nagod	Satna	Rewa division
Rampur Baghelan	Rampur Baghelan	Satna	Rewa division
Ramnagar	Ramnagar	Satna	Rewa division
Unchehra	Unchehra	Satna	Rewa division
Kotar	Kotar	Satna	Rewa division
Birsinghpur	Birsinghpur	Satna	Rewa division
Kothi	Kothi	Satna	Rewa division
Bahari	Bahari	Sidhi	Rewa division
Kusmi	Kusmi	Sidhi	Rewa division
Churhat	Churhat	Sidhi	Rewa division
Majhauli	Majhauli	Sidhi	Rewa division
Rampur Naikin	Rampur Naikin	Sidhi	Rewa division
Gopad Banas	Sidhi	Sidhi	Rewa division
Sihawal	Sihawal	Sidhi	Rewa division
Singrauli Urban	Waidhan	Singrauli	Rewa division
Singrauli	Waidhan	Singrauli	Rewa division
Chitrangi	Chitrangi	Singrauli	Rewa division
Devsar	Devsar	Singrauli	Rewa division
Mada	Mada	Singrauli	Rewa division
Sarai	Sarai	Singrauli	Rewa division
Chhatarpur	Chhatarpur	Chhatarpur	Sagar division
Bada Malhera	Bada Malhera	Chhatarpur	Sagar division
Bijawar	Bijawar	Chhatarpur	Sagar division
Buxwaha	Buxwaha	Chhatarpur	Sagar division
Chandla	Chandla	Chhatarpur	Sagar division
Gaurihar	Gaurihar	Chhatarpur	Sagar division
Ghuwara	Ghuwara	Chhatarpur	Sagar division
Laundi	Laundi	Chhatarpur	Sagar division
Maharajpur	Maharajpur	Chhatarpur	Sagar division
Nowgong	Nowgong	Chhatarpur	Sagar division
Rajnagar	Rajnagar	Chhatarpur	Sagar division
Damoh	Damoh	Damoh	Sagar division
Patharia	Patharia	Damoh	Sagar division
Batiagarh	Batiyagarh	Damoh	Sagar division
Hatta	Hatta	Damoh	Sagar division
Patera	Patera, Damoh	Damoh	Sagar division
Tendukheda	Tendu Kheda	Damoh	Sagar division
Jabera	Jabera	Damoh	Sagar division
Panna	Panna	Panna	Sagar division
Ajaygarh	Ajaygarh	Panna	Sagar division
Amanganj	Amanganj	Panna	Sagar division
Devendranagar	Devendranagar	Panna	Sagar division
Gunnor	Gunnor	Panna	Sagar division
Pawai	Pawai	Panna	Sagar division
Raipura	Raipura	Panna	Sagar division
Shahnagar	Shahnagar	Panna	Sagar division
Simariya	Simariya	Panna	Sagar division
Sagar	Sagar	Sagar	Sagar division
Bina	Bina	Sagar	Sagar division
Khurai	Khurai	Sagar	Sagar division
Malthone	Malthon	Sagar	Sagar division
Banda	Banda	Sagar	Sagar division
Shahgarh	Shahgarh	Sagar	Sagar division
Rahatgarh	Rahatgarh	Sagar	Sagar division
Jaisinagar	Jaisinagar	Sagar	Sagar division
Garhakota	Garhakota	Sagar	Sagar division
Rehli	Rehli	Sagar	Sagar division
Deori	Deori	Sagar	Sagar division
Kesli	Kesli	Sagar	Sagar division
Tikamgarh	Tikamgarh	Tikamgarh	Sagar division
Jatara	Jatara	Tikamgarh	Sagar division
Mohangarh	Mohangarh	Tikamgarh	Sagar division
Lidhora	Lidhora	Tikamgarh	Sagar division
Baldeogarh	Baldeogarh	Tikamgarh	Sagar division
Khargapur	Khargapur	Tikamgarh	Sagar division
Palera	Palera	Tikamgarh	Sagar division
Niwari	Niwari	Niwari	Sagar division
Prithvipur	Prithvipur	Niwari	Sagar division
Orchha	Orchha	Niwari	Sagar division
Anuppur	Anuppur	Anuppur	Shahdol division
Jaithari	Jaithari	Anuppur	Shahdol division
Kotma	Kotma	Anuppur	Shahdol division
Pushprajgarh	Pushprajgarh	Anuppur	Shahdol division
Shahdol	Shahdol	Shahdol	Shahdol division
Jaisinghnagar	Jaisinghnagar	Shahdol	Shahdol division
Sohagpur	Sohagpur (Shahdol)	Shahdol	Shahdol division
Beohari	Beohari	Shahdol	Shahdol division
Gohapur	Gohapur	Shahdol	Shahdol division
Burhar	Burhar	Shahdol	Shahdol division
Jaitpur	Jaitpur	Shahdol	Shahdol division
Umaria	Umaria	Umaria	Shahdol division
Bandhavgarh	Bandhavgarh	Umaria	Shahdol division
Manpur	Manpur	Umaria	Shahdol division
Pali	Pali	Umaria	Shahdol division
Chandia	Chandia	Umaria	Shahdol division
Nowrozabad	Nowrozabad	Umaria	Shahdol division
Karkeli	Karkeli	Umaria	Shahdol division
Agar	Agar	Agar Malwa	Ujjain division
Barode	Barode	Agar Malwa	Ujjain division
Susner	Susner	Agar Malwa	Ujjain division
Nalkheda	Nalkheda	Agar Malwa	Ujjain division
Bagli	Bagli	Dewas	Ujjain division
Dewas	Dewas	Dewas	Ujjain division
Hatpipliya	Hatpipliya	Dewas	Ujjain division
Kannod	Kannod	Dewas	Ujjain division
Khategaon	Khategaon	Dewas	Ujjain division
Satwas	Satwas	Dewas	Ujjain division
Sonkatch	Sonkatch	Dewas	Ujjain division
Tonk Khurd	Tonk Khurd	Dewas	Ujjain division
Mandsaur	Mandsaur	Mandsaur	Ujjain division
Malhargarh	Malhargarh	Mandsaur	Ujjain division
Sitamau	Sitamau	Mandsaur	Ujjain division
Suvasara	Suvasara	Mandsaur	Ujjain division
Bhanpura	Bhanpura	Mandsaur	Ujjain division
Garoth	Garoth	Mandsaur	Ujjain division
Shamgarh	Shamgarh	Mandsaur	Ujjain division
Daloda	Daloda	Mandsaur	Ujjain division
Neemuch Nagar	Neemuch	Neemuch	Ujjain division
Neemuch	Neemuch	Neemuch	Ujjain division
Jiran	Jiran	Neemuch	Ujjain division
Manasa	Manasa	Neemuch	Ujjain division
Rampura	Rampura	Neemuch	Ujjain division
Jawad	Jawad	Neemuch	Ujjain division
Singoli	Singoli	Neemuch	Ujjain division
Ratlam	Ratlam	Ratlam	Ujjain division
Ratlam Rural	Ratlam	Ratlam	Ujjain division
Sailana	Sailana	Ratlam	Ujjain division
Bajna	Bajna	Ratlam	Ujjain division
Raoti	Raoti	Ratlam	Ujjain division
Jaora	Jaora	Ratlam	Ujjain division
Piploda	Piploda	Ratlam	Ujjain division
Alot	Alot	Ratlam	Ujjain division
Tal	Tal	Ratlam	Ujjain division
Shajapur	Shajapur	Shajapur	Ujjain division
Mohan Badodiya	Mohan Badodiya	Shajapur	Ujjain division
Gulana	Gulana	Shajapur	Ujjain division
Shujalpur	Shujalpur	Shajapur	Ujjain division
Kalapipal	Kalapipal	Shajapur	Ujjain division
Avantipur Badodiya	Avantipur Badodiya	Shajapur	Ujjain division
Polay Kalan	Polay Kalan	Shajapur	Ujjain division
Ujjain	Ujjain	Ujjain	Ujjain division
Ujjain Rural	Ujjain	Ujjain	Ujjain division
Ujjain Kothi Mahal	Ujjain Kothi Mahal	Ujjain	Ujjain division
Ghatiya	Ghatiya	Ujjain	Ujjain division
Tarana	Tarana	Ujjain	Ujjain division
Makdone	Makdone	Ujjain	Ujjain division
Mehidpur	Mehidpur	Ujjain	Ujjain division
Jharda	Jharda	Ujjain	Ujjain division
Badnagar	Badnagar	Ujjain	Ujjain division
Khachrod	Khachrod	Ujjain	Ujjain division
Nagda	Nagda	Ujjain	Ujjain division

== See also ==
- List of districts of Madhya Pradesh
