= Warla =

Warla may refer to:

- Warla, Madhya Pradesh, a village in India
  - Warla tehsil, the large administrative unit
- Warla, Achham, a village in Nepal
- Warla (film), a 2025 Philippine transgender-related drama crime film

== See also ==
- Worla
