= Kachnariya =

Village in Madhya Pradesh, India

Kachnariya is a village in the Rajgarh district of Madhya Pradesh, India. It is located in the Biaora tehsil.

== Demographics ==
According to the 2011 census of India, Kachnariya has 267 households. The effective literacy rate (i.e. the literacy rate of population excluding children aged 6 and below) is 64.8%.

Demographics (2011 Census)
	Total	Male	Female
Population	1232	656	576
Children aged below 6 years	178	85	93
Scheduled caste	440	242	198
Scheduled tribe	15	10	5
Literates	683	426	257
Workers (all)	432	305	127
Main workers (total)	215	196	19
Main workers: Cultivators	51	49	2
Main workers: Agricultural labourers	132	116	16
Main workers: Household industry workers	3	3	0
Main workers: Other	29	28	1
Marginal workers (total)	217	109	108
Marginal workers: Cultivators	0	0	0
Marginal workers: Agricultural labourers	189	90	99
Marginal workers: Household industry workers	3	2	1
Marginal workers: Others	25	17	8
Non-workers	800	351	449
