= Agarda =

- village
- Location in Madhya Pradesh, India Agarda (India)
- Coordinates: 22.711°N 76.966°E
- Country: India
- State: Madhya Pradesh
- District: Dewas
- Tehsil: Khategaon

Government
  - MLA: Ashish Sharma (BJP)

Population (2011)
  - Total: 907

Languages
  - Official: Hindi
- Time zone: UTC+5:30 (IST)
- PIN: 455336
- Telephone code: 07274
- ISO 3166 code: IN-MP
- Vehicle registration: MP-41

Agarda is a village and a panchayat in Khategaon tehsil of Dewas district in the Indian state of Madhya Pradesh. As of the 2011 Census of India, the village had a population of 907 spread over 161 households.
