= Lanji tehsil =

Lanji
- Tehsil
- Location in Madhya Pradesh Lanji (India)
- Coordinates: 21.510916°N 80.549401°E
- Country: India
- State: Madhya Pradesh
- District: Balaghat district

Government
  - Type: Janpad Panchayat
  - Body: Council

Area
  - Total: 764.68 km^{2} (295.24 sq mi)

Population (2011)
  - Total: 187,624

Languages
  - Official: Hindi
- Time zone: UTC+5:30 (IST)
- Postal code (PIN): 481222
- Area code: 07635
- ISO 3166 code: MP-IN
- Vehicle registration: MP 50
- No. of Villages: 162
- Sex ratio: 1011

Lanji tehsil is a fourth-order administrative and revenue division, a subdivision of third-order administrative and revenue division of Balaghat district of Madhya Pradesh. It includes the Lanji village.

== Geography ==
Lanji tehsil has an area of 764.68 sq kilometers. It is bounded by Maharashtra in the south, southwest and west, Kirnapur tehsil in the northwest, Baihar tehsil in the north and Chhattisgarh in the northeast, east and southeast.

== Culture ==
The population of Lanji mostly speak Hindibut includes many other, including the Marathi& Chhattisgarhi. Lanji is a village with a rich culture and civilisation. Through Lanji History it has hosted many people coming from East (Chhattisgarh), South (Maharashtra) and North ( North Madhya Pradesh). All those civilisations have affected the social structure of Lanji

== Economy ==
=== Agriculture ===
There is sufficient rainfall in the Lanji region for purely Agriculture. The main agricultural crop is rice. floating rice. Seed is sown at the beginning of the rainy season (June–July).

== Education ==
=== Schools ===
- Government Model Higher Secondary School Lanji
- Saket Public School Lanji
- Central India Academy Lanji
- Pali Academic Institution, Bisoni, Lanji

== See also ==
- Balaghat district
- Hina Kaware
- Bhagwat Bhau Nagpure
