= Neelkanth temple, Alwar district =

Hindu temple in Rajasthan, India

Coordinates: 27.247407°N 76.351966°E

Neelkanth temple
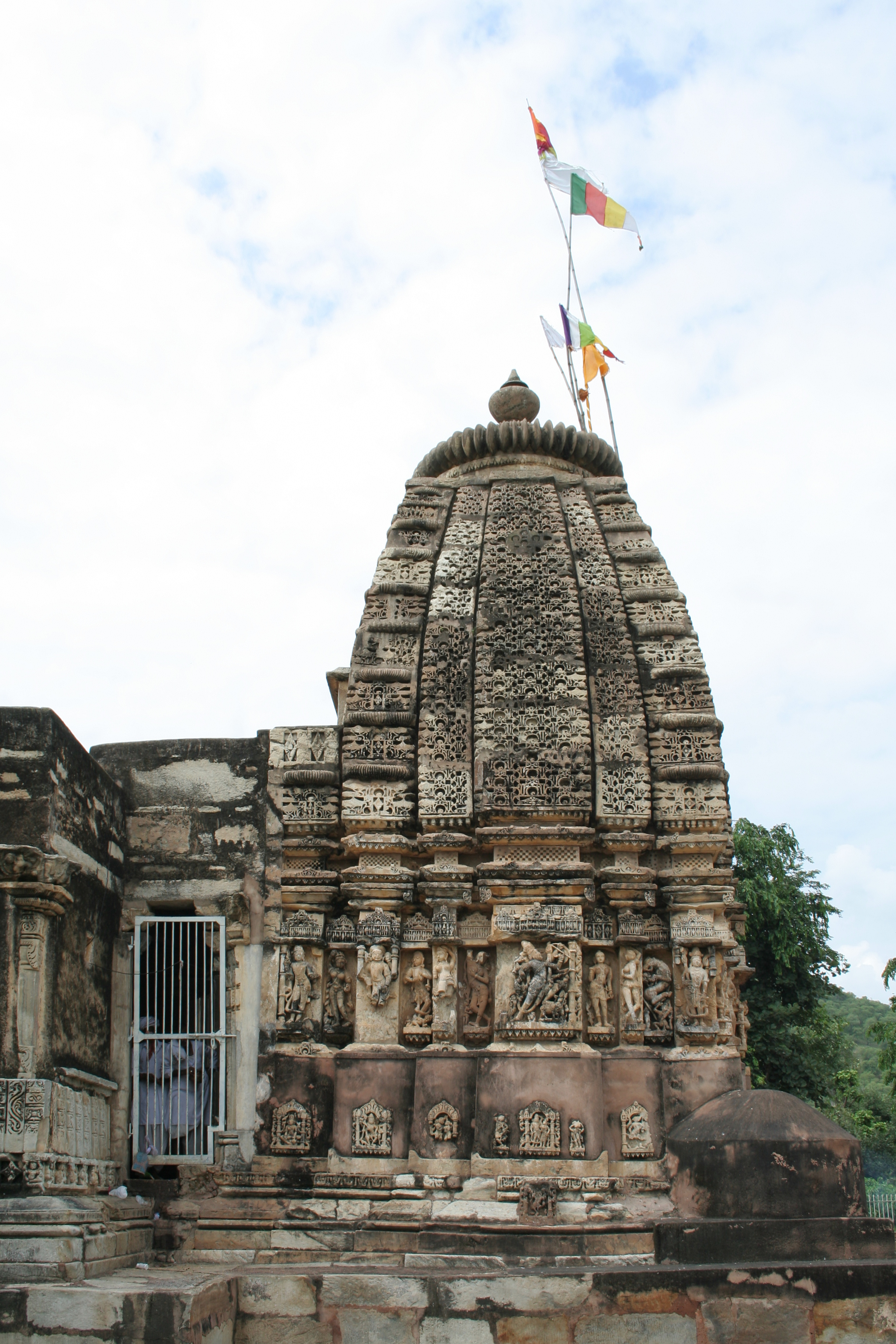

Religion
- Affiliation: Hinduism
- District: Alwar
- Deity: Shiva

Location
- Location: Rajgarh tehsil, Alwar district, Rajasthan, India
- State: Rajasthan
- Country: India

Architecture
- Creator: Parmeshwara Mathanadeva

Neelkanth temple is a Hindu temple in the Rajgarh tehsil, in Alwar district, Rajasthan, India. It is dedicated to the god Shiva (Neelkanth is one of the name given to Shiva). It is situated in an isolated hill near the Sariska National Park, and access can only be gained by a steep track. It was built between the 6th to the 9th century CE by Parmeshwara Mathanadeva, a local Pratihara feudatory.

== Erotic statues ==
It shows a number of sculptures, including erotic ones, in the same style shown in Khajuraho.

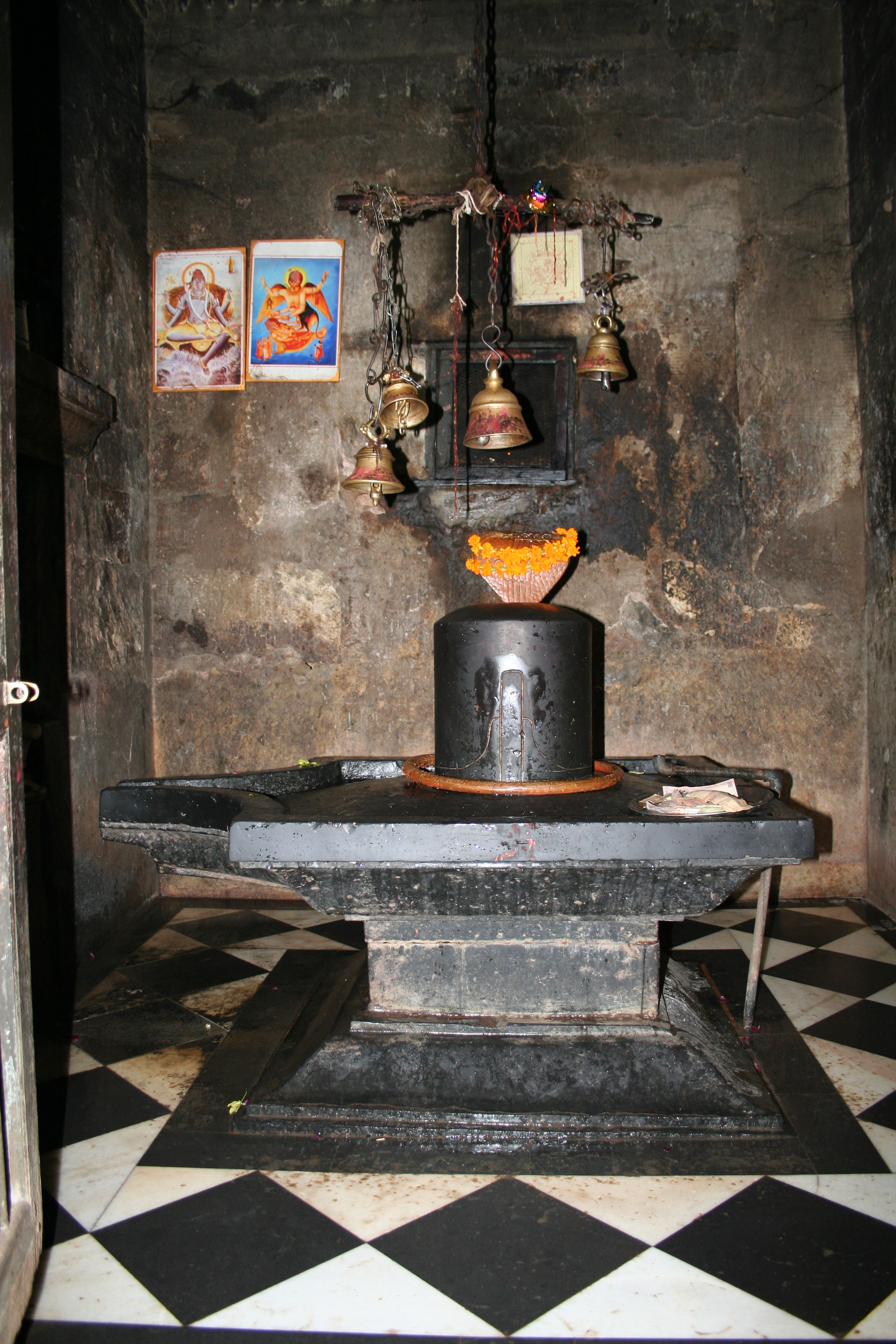
Shiv Lingam inside Neelkanth temple

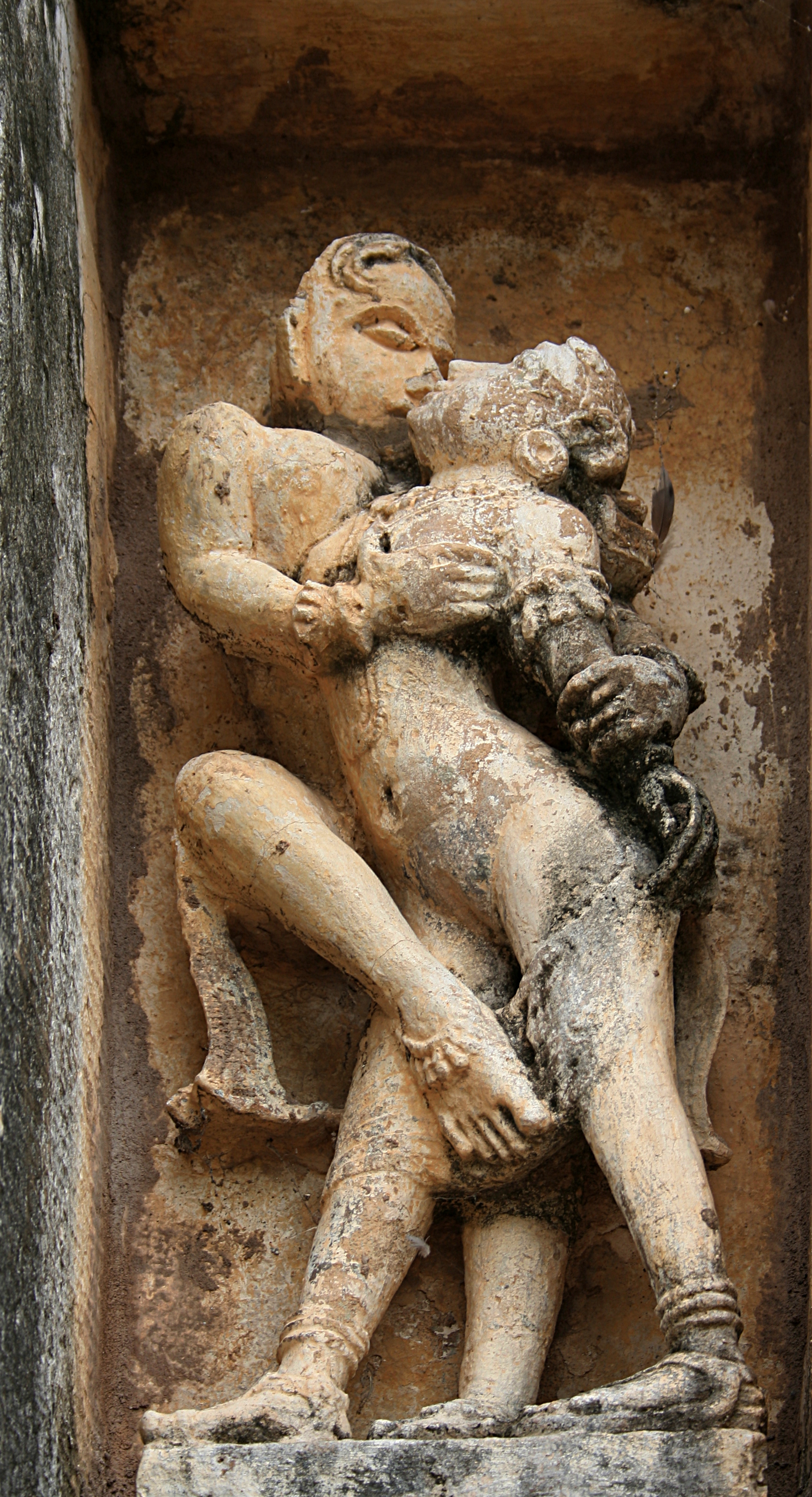
Erotic sculpture

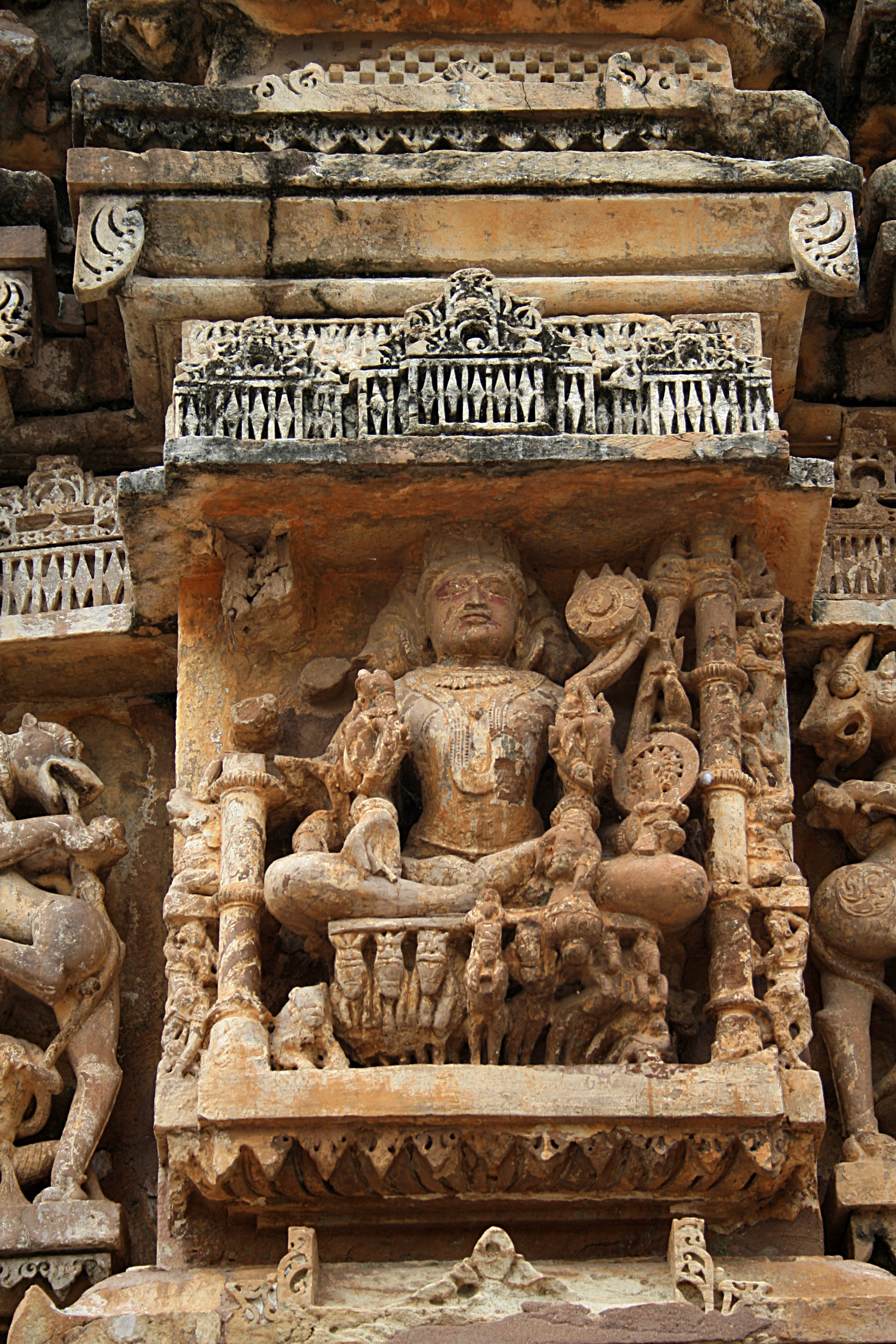
Sculpture of Shiva

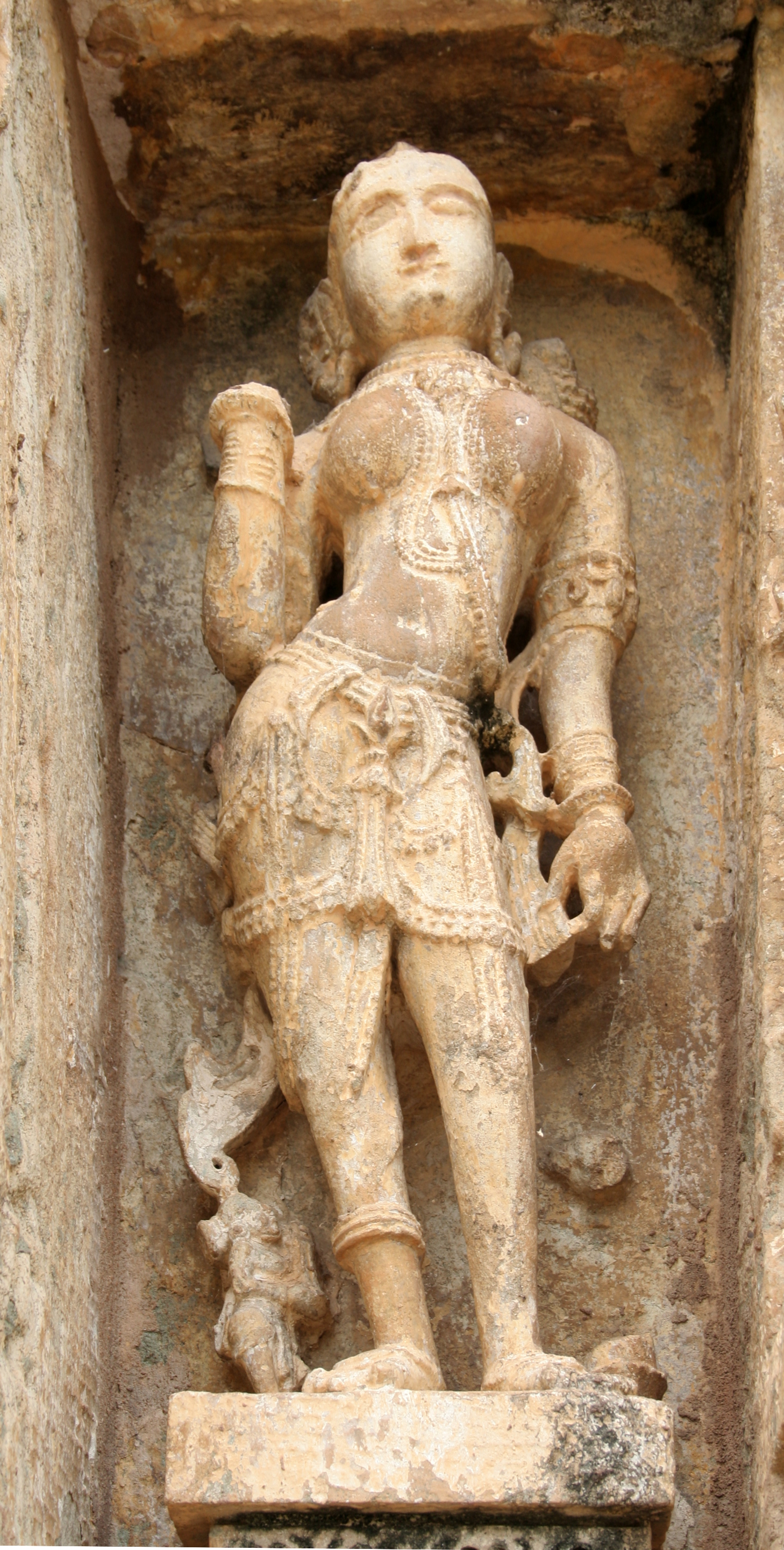

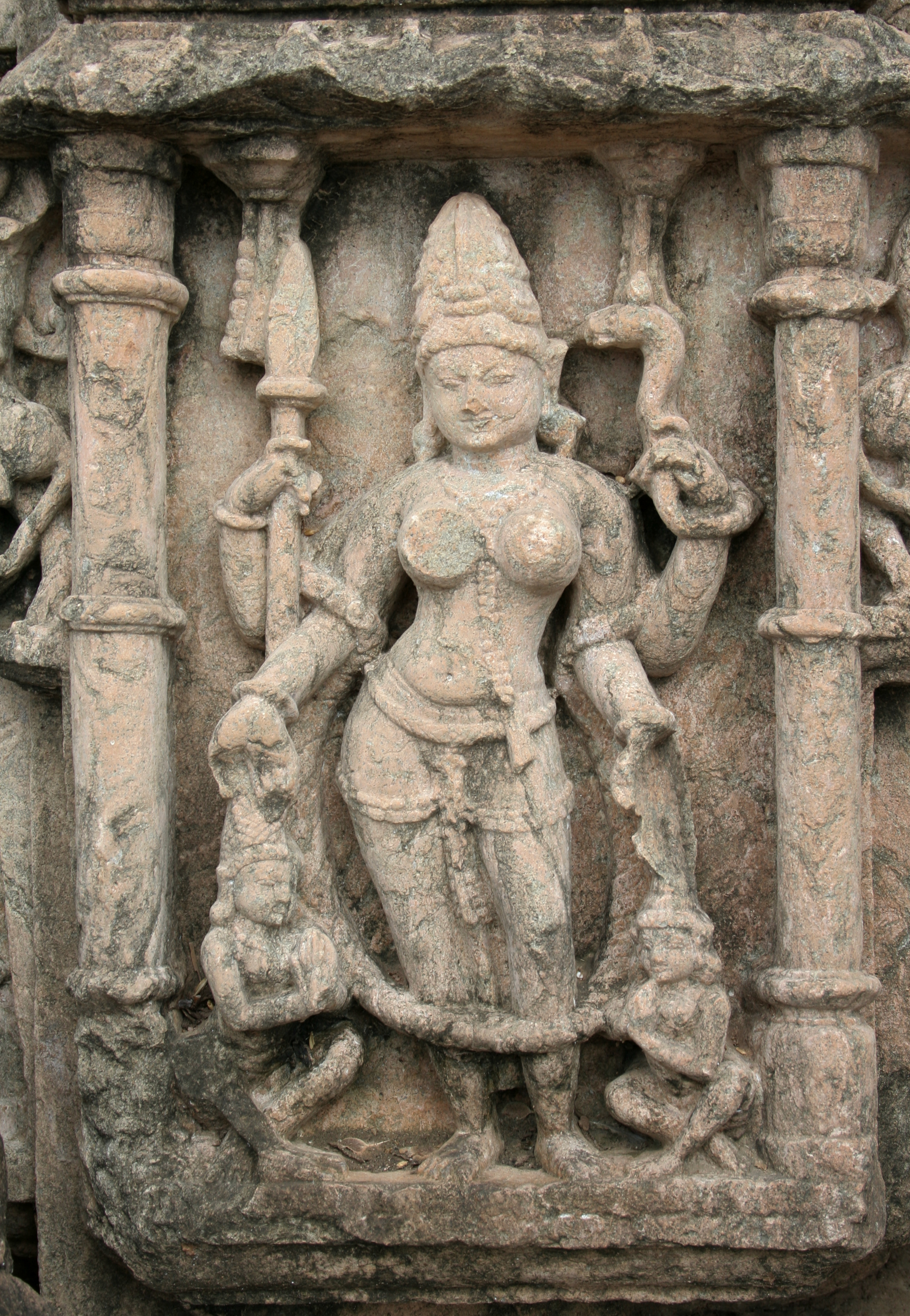

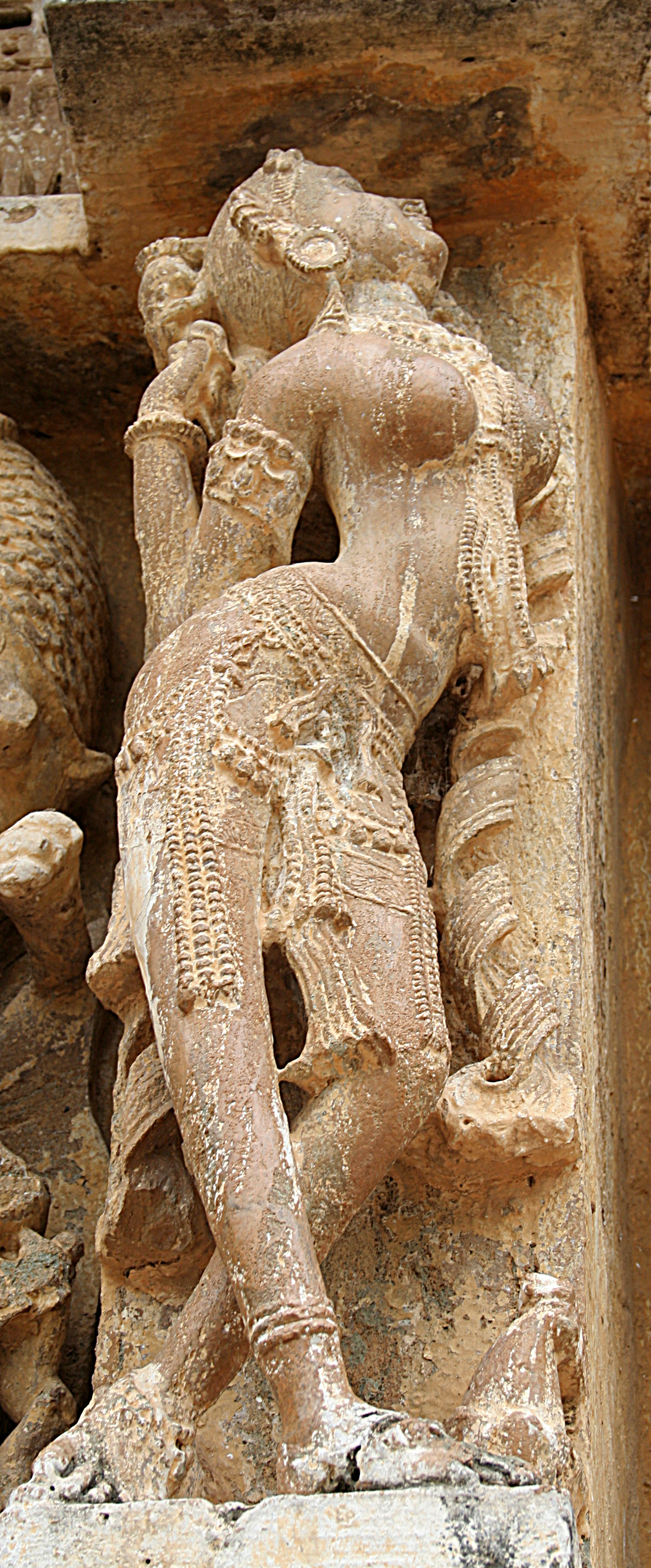
