= Cesare Majoli =

Italian priest and naturalist (1746–1823)

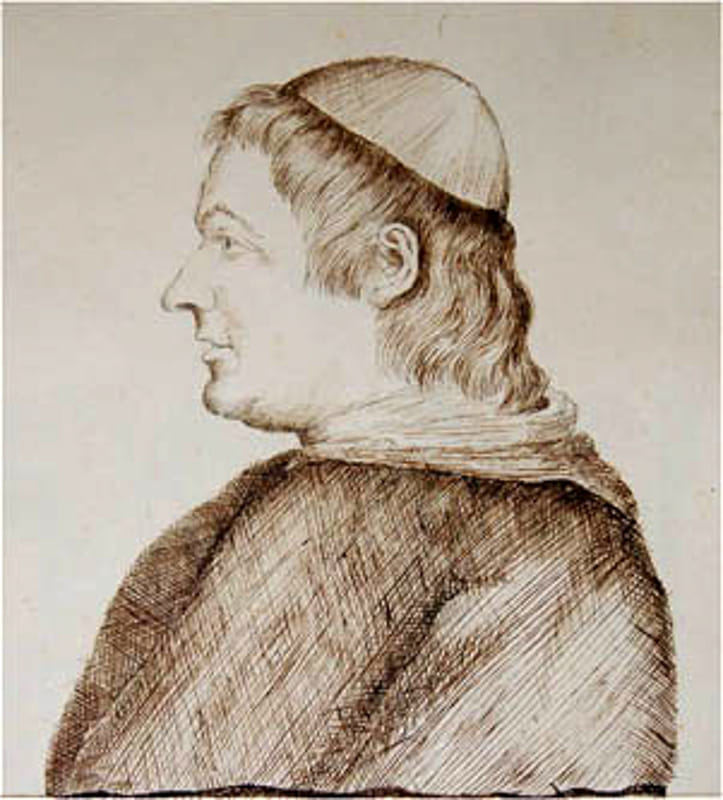

Cesare Majoli born Francesco Antonio Majoli (28 February 1746 – 11 January 1823) was an Italian priest, librarian, naturalist and polymath from Forli. He served as a professor of philosophy at the University of Rome, and took a keen interest in natural history and described and illustrated numerous plants and animals especially after returning to Forli. He favoured illustrations to collecting specimens and nearly 6000 watercolours made by him survive in the Forli Municipal Library in Italy.

== Life and work ==
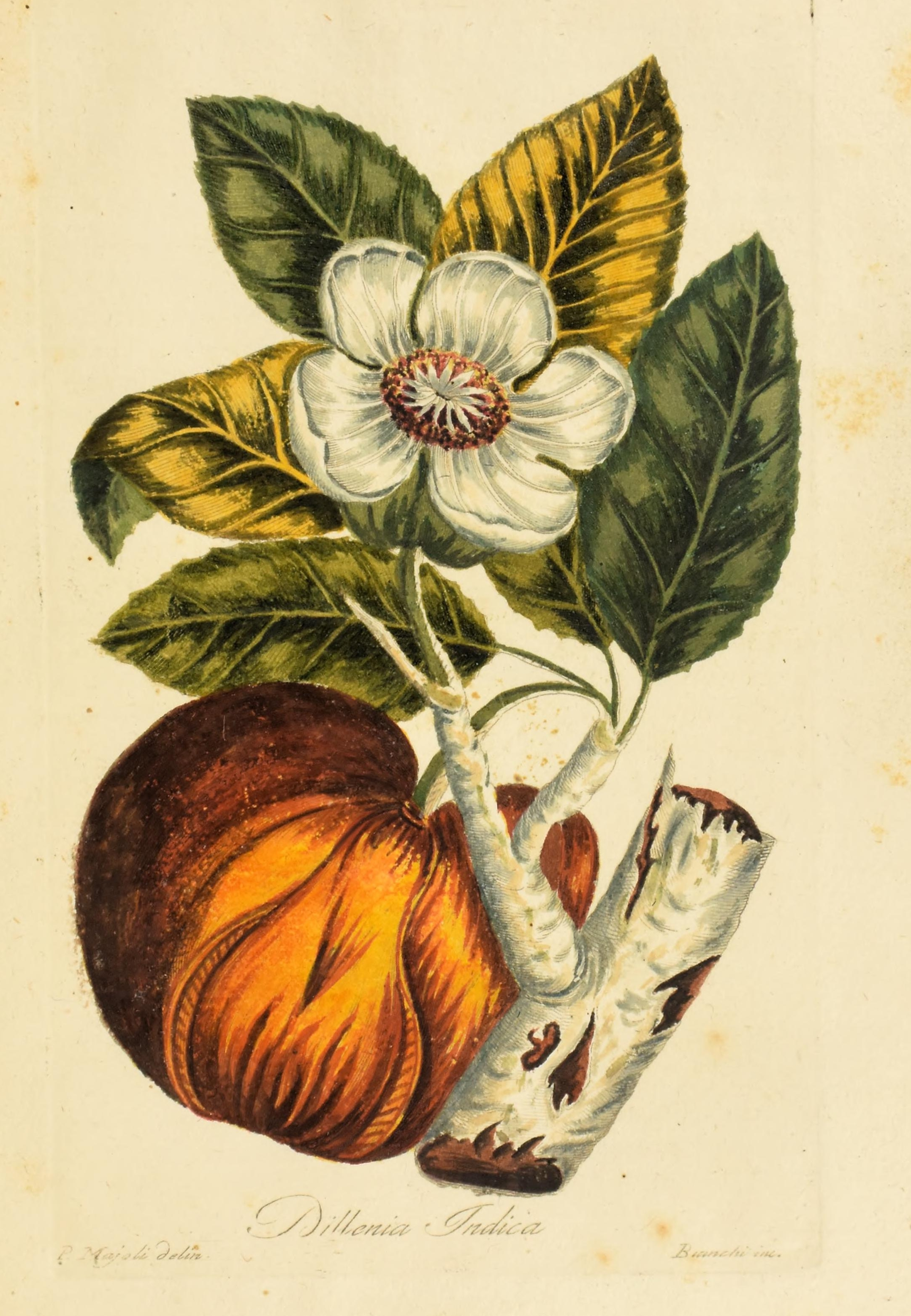
Dillenia indica drawn by Majoli in the work of John Hill

Majoli was born in Forli and entered the Order of the Hieronymites at the age of seventeen and studied theology at Rome, Ferrara (1770) and Bagnacavallo (where he studied under Antonio Lucchesi). One of the inspirations to study natural history was the lectures he attended of Giovanni Domenico Coleti between 1772 and 1773 in Romagna. He was given the name of Cesare upon being inducted at the convent of Montebello (Urbino). He taught theology at Imola and physics in Ferrara (1775) and in 1780 he taught physics in Fano. While in Ferrara he was in the circle of scholars that included Lorenzo Barotti, Gianfrancesco Malfatti, and Alessandro Zorzi. He moved to Rome in 1781 and became chair of philosophy at the university. He taught theology and philosophy and was put in charge of the library of the palace. In 1790 he returned to his hometown of Forli to the convent of San Michele and taught geometry at the Gymnasium. The invasion by the French resulted in the Jacobin Republic (1796) and the suppression of his religious order. In 1803 the local government selected him to help in the establishment of a civic library at Forli but he did not take it up due to eye problems. He had a bad cataract operation in 1814 and his vision was fixed with another surgery in 1818. He then took up the work of setting up the library which is now known as the Aurelio Saffi. He described plants and animals preferring to illustrate them rather than to collect specimens and some of his unpublished works included nearly 600 insects. He conducted some experiments on insect metamorphosis in 1813, producing intermediate forms between larvae and adults in silkworms using higher temperatures. His work on plants included 1800 illustrated plates some included in Dissertatio phytologica in collaboration with brother Angelo Gabrielli . He contributed 10 plates to the book A Decade of Curious and Elegant Trees and Plants by John Hill. He contributed plates to the work of Pietro Orlandi on livestock diseases. He collaborated with others including the Abbot Filippo Luigi Gigli and Gasparo Xuarez. He was also skilled in optics and made microscopes and he was so well known that many naturalists of the period including Andre Thouin, Gaetano Savi, and Ottaviano Tozzetti visited him. Eye problems including a cataract interrupted his researches but he also wrote on pedagogy, entomology, ichthyology and ornithology. A major work over a twenty year period was on the plants and made use of the Linnaean system of binomial names - Plantarum collectio iuxta Linnaeum sistema.
