= Tirodi tehsil =

Tehsil in Madhya Pradesh, India

Tirodi
- Tehsil
- Location in Madhya Pradesh Tirodi (India)
- Coordinates: 21.685861°N 79.723161°E
- Country: India
- State: Madhya Pradesh
- District: Balaghat district

Government
  - Type: Janpad Panchayat
  - Body: Council

Area
  - Total: 8.81 km^{2} (3.40 sq mi)

Population (2011)
  - Total: 79,401

Languages
  - Official: Hindi
- Time zone: UTC+5:30 (IST)
- Postal code (PIN): 481449
- Area code: 07630
- ISO 3166 code: MP-IN
- Vehicle registration: MP 50
- No. of Villages: 173
- Sex ratio: 1016

Tirodi tehsil is a fourth-order administrative and revenue division, a subdivision of third-order administrative and revenue division of Balaghat district of Madhya Pradesh.

== Geography ==
Tirodi tehsil has an area of 8.81 sq kilometers. It is bounded by Maharashtra in the southeast, south, southwest and west, Seoni district in the northwest, Katangi tehsil in the north and Khairlanji tehsil in the northeast and east.

== See also ==
- Balaghat district
