= Bamulia =

Village in Madhya Pradesh, India

Coordinates: 25.7953°N 76.7409°E

Bamulia is a village in Sheopur district of Madhya Pradesh state of India.
