= Majoli =

Majoli is a surname. Notable people with the surname include:

- Alex Majoli (born 1971), Italian photographer
- Cesare Majoli (1746–1823), Italian priest and naturalist
- Iva Majoli (born 1977), Croatian tennis player
- Monica Majoli (born 1963), American artist
- Simone Majoli (1520–1597), Italian canon lawyer, bishop, and author

== See also ==
- Majuli
