= Lanji Assembly constituency =

Constituency of the Madhya Pradesh legislative assembly in India

Coordinates: 21.51°N 80.55°E

Lanji
- Constituency No. 109 for the Madhya Pradesh Legislative Assembly

Constituency details
- Country: India
- Region: Central India
- State: Madhya Pradesh
- District: Balaghat
- Lok Sabha constituency: Balaghat
- Established: 1951
- Reservation: None

Member of Legislative Assembly
- 16th Madhya Pradesh Legislative Assembly
- Incumbent Rajkumar Karrahe
- Party: BJP
- Elected year: 2023
- Preceded by: Hina Kaware

Lanji Assembly constituency is one of the 230 Vidhan Sabha (Legislative Assembly) constituencies of Madhya Pradesh state in central India. It is part of Balaghat district.

== Members of Legislative Assembly ==
=== As a constituency of Madhya Bharat ===
- 1951, Tejlal Tembhre Indian National Congress

=== As a constituency of Madhya Pradesh ===
Election	Member	Party
1962	Narbada Prasad	Praja Socialist Party
1967	Narbada Prasad	Indian National Congress
1972	Narbada Prasad	Independent
1977	Yashwant Rao Khongal	Indian National Congress
1980	Yashwant Rao Khongal	Indian National Congress
1985	Narbada Parsad	Janata Party
1990	Dilip Bhatere	Independent
1993	Dilip Bhatere	Bharatiya Janata Party
1998	Bhagwat Bhau Nagpure	Indian National Congress
2003	Dileep Kumar	Bharatiya Janata Party
2008	Ramesh Dileep Bhatere	Bharatiya Janata Party
2013	Hina Kaware	Indian National Congress
2018	Hina Kaware	Indian National Congress
2023	Rajkumar Karrahe	Bharatiya Janata Party

== Election results ==
=== 2023 ===
2023 Madhya Pradesh Legislative Assembly election: Lanji
Party	Candidate	Votes	%	±%
BJP	Rajkumar Karrahe	101,005	47.61	+9.52
INC	Hina Kaware	98,232	46.3	−1.72
BSP	Ashok Marathe	3,556	1.68	−1.3
NOTA	None of the above	1,767	0.83	−0.11
Majority		2,773	1.31	−8.62
Turnout		212,144	85.26	+3.51
BJP gain from INC		Swing		

=== 2018 ===
2018 Madhya Pradesh Legislative Assembly election: Lanji
Party	Candidate	Votes	%	±%
INC	Hina Kaware	90,382	48.02	
BJP	Ramesh Deelip Bhatere	71,686	38.09	
BSP	Mira Nanaji Samrite	5,608	2.98	
GGP	Anaram Dhok	4,671	2.48	
Independent	Vijay Bisen (Manish)	2,668	1.42	
Independent	Kamalprasad Mandalwar	2,585	1.37	
Independent	Chunnelal Sudharam Harade	2,530	1.34	
Peoples Party of India (Democratic)	Narendra Jamre	2,198	1.17	
NOTA	None of the above	1,769	0.94	
Majority		18,696	9.93	
Turnout		188,225	81.75	
INC hold		Swing		

=== 2013 ===
2013 Madhya Pradesh Legislative Assembly election: Lanji
Party	Candidate	Votes	%	±%
INC	Hina Kaware	79,068	47.50	
BJP	Ramesh Dileep Bhatere	47318	28.43	
Independent	Yogesh Samarite	17501	10.51	
BSP	Jyoti Umare	6319	3.80	N/A
Independent	Sukharam Asatkar	3630	2.18	
Independent	Pt. Ramkishor Sharma	2644	1.59	
SS	Ranjish Jagdish Badaghaiya	2389	1.44	
Independent	Ramesh Kamde	1497	0.90	
SP	Vijay Beniram Ware	993	0.60	N/A
Independent	Meena Uikey	668	0.40	
Independent	Pt. Mithlesh Mishra	572	0.34	
Independent	Narendra Puranlal Jamare	539	0.32	
Independent	Dali Kaware	481	0.29	
Independent	Daulat Kumar Bagade	458	0.28	
NOTA	None of the Above	2368	1.42	
Majority				
Turnout		166445	80.27	
Swing to INC from BJP		Swing		

== See also ==
- Lanji
