= Niwali tehsil =

Niwali
- Tehsil
- Location in Madhya Pradesh Niwali (India)
- Coordinates: 21.682620°N 74.921430°E
- Country: India
- State: Madhya Pradesh
- District: Barwani district

Government
  - Type: Janpad Panchayat
  - Body: Council

Area
  - Total: 385.51 km^{2} (148.85 sq mi)

Population (2011)
  - Total: 112,639

Languages
  - Official: Hindi
- Time zone: UTC+5:30 (IST)
- Postal code (PIN): 451667
- Area code: 07286
- ISO 3166 code: MP-IN
- Vehicle registration: MP 46
- No. of Villages: 79
- Sex ratio: 1008

Niwali tehsil is a fourth-order administrative and revenue division, a subdivision of third-order administrative and revenue division of Barwani district of Madhya Pradesh.

== Geography ==
Niwali tehsil has an area of 385.51 sq kilometers. It is bounded by Barwani tehsil in the northwest, Rajpur tehsil in the north, Sendhwa tehsil in the northeast, east and southeast, Maharashtra in the south and southwest and Pansemal tehsil in the west.

== See also ==
- Barwani district
