= Sheopur district =

- District of Madhya Pradesh
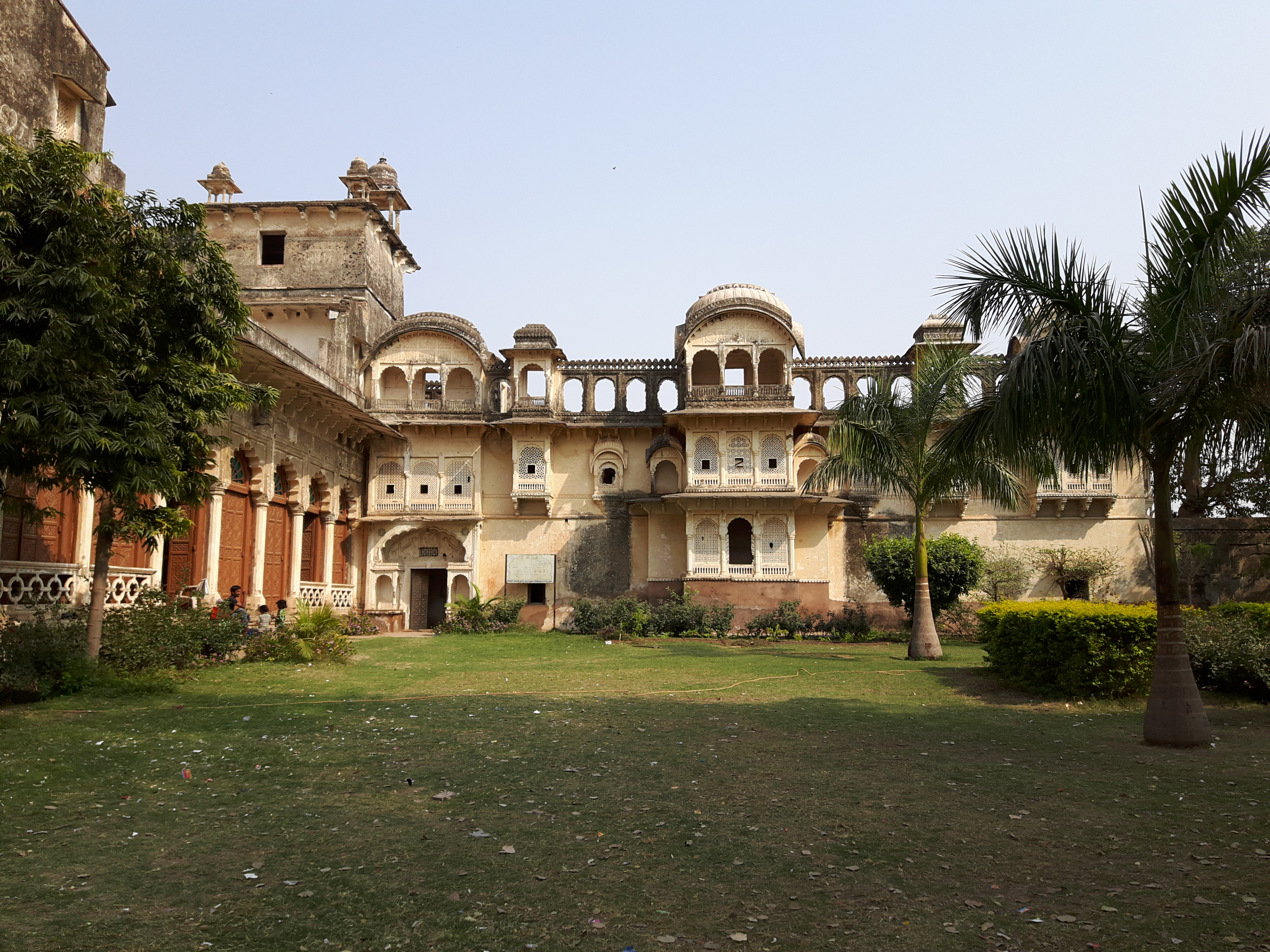
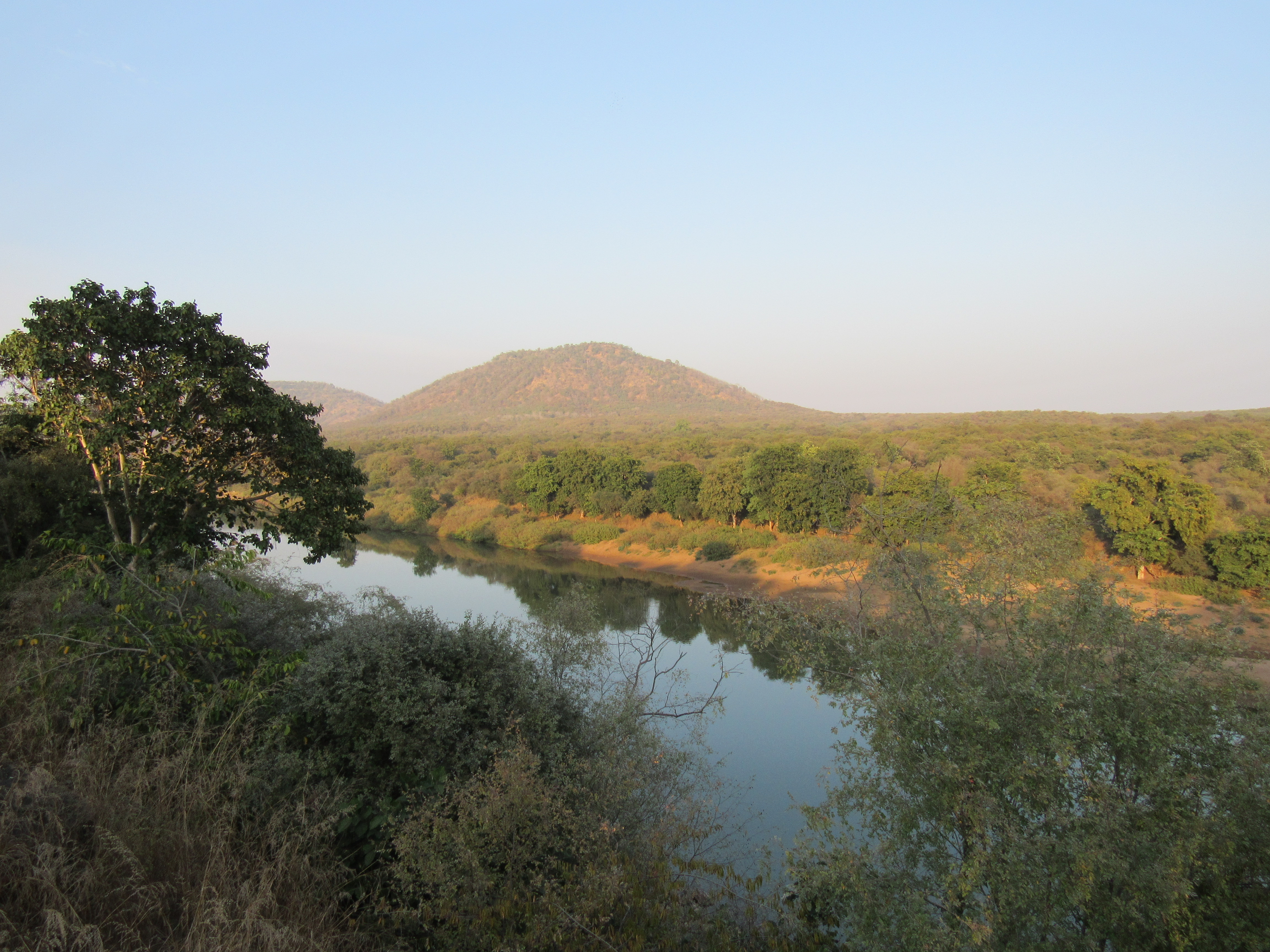
- Top: Sheopur Fort; Bottom: River in Kuno National Park

- Location of Sheopur district in Madhya Pradesh
- Country: India
- State: Madhya Pradesh
- Division: Chambal
- Headquarters: Sheopur
- Tehsils: 1. Sheopur 2. Vijaypur, 3. Karahal, 4. Birpur, 5. Badoda

Government
  - Collector & District Magistrate: Shri Shivam Verma IAS
  - Lok Sabha constituencies: Morena (shared with Morena district)
  - Vidhan Sabha constituencies: 1. Sheopur, 2. Vijaypur

Area
  - Total: 6,606 km^{2} (2,551 sq mi)

Population (2011)
  - Total: 687,861
  - Density: 104.1/km^{2} (269.7/sq mi)

Demographics
  - Literacy: 58.0
  - Sex ratio: 902
- Time zone: UTC+05:30 (IST)
- Vehicle registration: MP 31
- Website: sheopur.nic.in

Sheopur district (Hindi pronunciation: [ʃjoːpʊɾ]) is a district of Madhya Pradesh state in central India. The district is located in the north of the state and forms part of the Chambal division. It is situated on the periphery of Rajasthan, which shows in the influence of Rajasthani culture in this district.Sheopur District is in northern Madhya Pradesh, India.

The town of Sheopur is the district headquarters. Other towns include Bijeypur, Karahal and Badoda. The district has a population of 687,861 (2011 census) and covers an area of 6,606 km². It is the third least populous district of Madhya Pradesh (out of 50), after Harda and Umaria. It is one of 21 tribal districts of Madhya Pradesh.

== Geography ==
Sheopur district is located in the north of Madhya Pradesh in the Chambal division. It is bordered by Morena district to the north, Gwalior district to the east, Shivpuri district to the southeast, and Rajasthan to the south and northwest.

The region is chiefly marked by the presence of the Chambal ravines - the Chambal River marks the border with Rajasthan. Southeast of the Chambal is a plateau region which leads to a range of forested hills in the east of the district, where lies Kuno Wildlife Sanctuary.

== History ==
The town of Sheopur and its fort are believed to have been founded in 1537 by Indra Singh of the Gaur Rajputs, who were feudatories of Jaipur. The first historical mention of the region occurs thanks to Nimat Ullah, who recorded an expedition of SIkander Lodhi in support of Raj Dungar, who later converted to Islam. Sheopur surrendered to Akbar when he was advancing towards Chittor. Later it was made the headquarters of a mahal in Ranthambore Sarkar. In 1808, it was conquered by Daulat Rao Scindia of Gwalior, who gave it to his general Jean Baptiste Filose as a jagir. Filose managed to starve out the Gaurs remaining in the fort, who left in 1809. Under Daulat Rao, the town was a mint. While Filose was raiding the adjoining territory of Jai Singh of Raghogarh, Singh captured the fort and his family. After 1818, Filose retired to Sheopur as his jagir. Sheopur continued as a part of Gwalior state until 1947, when it became part of independent India. In 1956, it was merged with the remainder of Madhya Pradesh. Sheopur district was carved out of Morena District in 1998.

== Economy ==
In 2006, the Ministry of Panchayati Raj named Sheopur one of the country's 250 most backwards districts (out of a total of 640). It is one of the 24 districts in Madhya Pradesh currently receiving funds from the Backwards Regions Grant Fund Programme (BRGF).

== Divisions ==
The district comprises three sub-divisions: Sheopur, Vijaypur and Karahal. Sheopur sub-division consists of two tehsils: Sheopur and Baroda. Vijaypur sub-division also comprises two tehsils: Vijaypur and Veerpur. Karahal sub-division comprises the lone tehsil of Karahal. There are two nagar palikas in this district: Sheopur and Baroda, and a nagar panchayat, Vijaypur.

There are two Vidhan Sabha constituencies in this district, namely, Sheopur and Vijaypur. Both of these are part of the Morena Lok Sabha constituency.

== Demographics ==
Historical population
Year	Pop.	±% p.a.
1901	122,149	—
1911	120,427	−0.14%
1921	110,042	−0.90%
1931	120,805	+0.94%
1941	137,014	+1.27%
1951	151,107	+0.98%
1961	192,944	+2.47%
1971	242,988	+2.33%
1981	323,649	+2.91%
1991	431,480	+2.92%
2001	559,495	+2.63%
2011	687,861	+2.09%

Religions in Sheopur district (2011)
Religion	Percent
Hinduism	92.85%
Islam	6.02%
Sikhism	0.93%
Other or not stated	0.20%

According to the 2011 census, Sheopur District has a population of 687,861, roughly equal to the nation of Equatorial Guinea or the US state of North Dakota. This gives it a ranking of 505th in India (out of a total of 640). The district has a population density of 104 inhabitants per square kilometre (270/sq mi) . Its population growth rate over the decade 2001-2011 was 22.96%. Sheopur has a sex ratio of 902 females for every 1,000 males, and a literacy rate of 58.02%. 15.61% of the population live in urban areas. Scheduled Castes and Scheduled Tribes make up 15.76% and 23.47% of the population respectively. The Saharia are the main tribe in the area.

Languages of Sheopur district (2011)
1. Hindi (94.3%)
2. Urdu (2.02%)
3. Hinduri (1.73%)
4. Punjabi (0.91%)
5. Others (1.07%)

At the time of the 2011 Census of India, 94.27% of the population in the district spoke Hindi, 2.02% Urdu, 1.73% Handuri and 0.91% Punjabi as their first language.

== Tourist places ==
- Kuno National Park
- Sheopur Fort
- Saharia Museum

== See also ==
- Bamulia
- Kuno Wildlife Sanctuary
- Morena (Lok Sabha constituency)
