= Lanji =

- statutory town
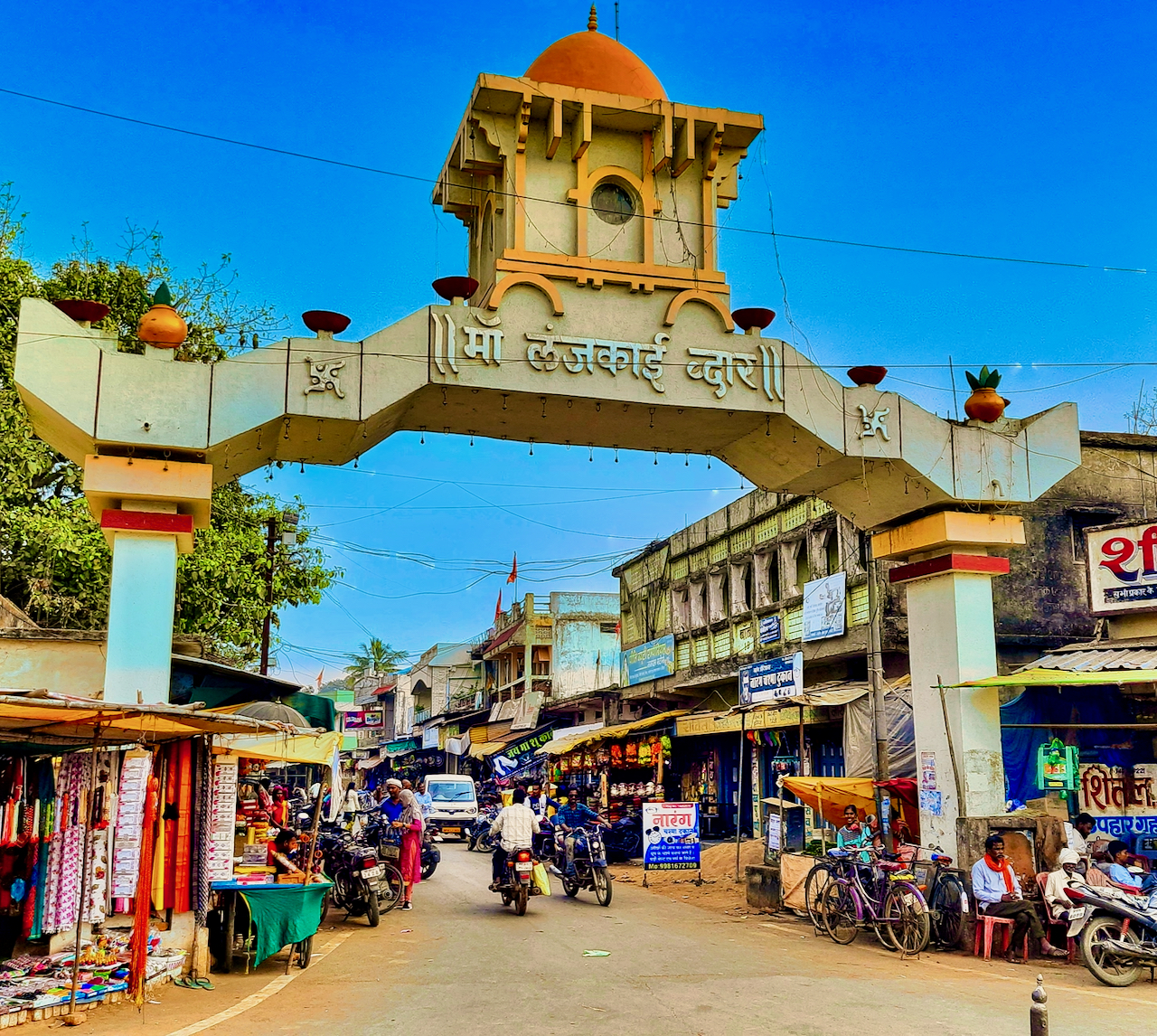
- Gateway of Lanji

- Location within Madhya Pradesh Location within India
- Coordinates: 21.5074°N 80.5512°E
- Country: India
- State: Madhya Pradesh
- District: Balaghat
- Block: Lanji

Population (2011)
  - Total: 13,558
- Time zone: UTC+5:30 (IST)
- Postal Index Number: 481222
- STD code: 07635
- ISO 3166 code: MP-IN
- Vehicle registration: MP-50 (RTO - Balaghat)

Lanji is a statutory town in the Lanji tehsil of Balaghat district in Madhya Pradesh, India. It is administered by a nagar panchayat, and is part of the Lanji assembly constituency and the Lanji community development block.

Lanji is located close to the Madhya Pradesh's border with Chhattisgarh and Maharashtra. It is located approximately 62 km from the district headquarters Balaghat. It is home to the Koteshwar Shiva temple, Gangli-raja (a site of the Gondwana Kingdom), the Lanji Fort (site under archeological survey of India) and a very beautiful waari dam is situated about 10 km distance from lanji.

== History ==
Lanji was earlier known as Lanjika, and was ruled by a branch of the Kalachuris of Ratnapura. During the Mughal period, it was a mahal (administrative division), as mentioned in the Ain-i-Akbari. Before the formation of the Balaghat district in 1867, it was a pargana (administrative unit).

== Demographics ==
|The Lanji Nagar Panchayat has population of 13,558; including 6,837 males and 6,721 females.

Hindi is the major language spoken here; notable minority languages include Marathi and some rural languages. Lanji is home to migrants from other areas, including from Chhattisgarh in east, Maharashtra in south, and other parts of Madhya Pradesh in north.

== Geography ==
The Lanji tehsil is situated on the border of Madhya Pradesh with Maharashtra and Chhattisgarh. The land includes plateau, forest, and the Maikal Hills.

A local pond shaped like the number "52" is called "Bawan talab" ("52 talab") by some locals.

== Education ==
Lanji has several schools, including

- Government Model Higher Secondary School Lanji
- Saket Public School Lanji
- Central India Academy Lanji
- Pali Academic Institution, Bisoni, Lanji
- Sarswati Shishu Mandir, Lanji

== Economy ==
Rice is the main crop in Lanji, and seed is sown at the beginning of the rainy season in June–July.

== Tourism ==
Notable tourist places in and around Lanji include:

- Lanji Fort & Temple
- Lanjkayi Temple
- Koteshwar Temple
- Balaji Temple
- Gangli Raja
- Lodama Waterfall
- Beautiful natural lake view point at Waari (about 10 km from lanji)
- Sai Temple at Kakodi (About 7 km from lanji)
- Son river is main source of tourism and cropping

== Lanji Fort (Lanji Ka Kila) ==
Lanji Fort (also known as Lanji Ka Kila) is a historical fort located in Lanji, Balaghat district, Madhya Pradesh, India. Built in the 12th century by Raja Malukoma, the fort is an important symbol of Rajput architecture and medieval defense systems. It is known for its massive stone walls, intricate carvings, and a deep moat that once contained crocodiles for security. Inside the fort, there is an ancient temple dedicated to Princess Hasla, who is revered for her bravery and sacrifice. The fort also has religious significance due to the Mahakali, Vishnu, and Ganesha temples nearby. Although the fort is now in ruins, it remains a site of historical and cultural importance and is protected by the Archaeological Survey of India (ASI).

== Politics ==
Lanji is administered by a nagar panchayat.

It is part of the Lanji Vidhan Sabha constituency. Hina Kaware, the Deputy Speaker of the Madhya Pradesh Legislative Assembly, is the current legislator from Lanji and Kirnapur. Past legislators include Bhagwat Bhau Nagpure.

In the past, Naxalites have operated in the area.

== Naxalism ==
Lanji is suffering from naxalism, many naxalite have active there. Generally it is very common problems in South East Madhya Pradesh.
