= Shadhora tehsil =

Shadhora
- Tehsil
- Location in Madhya Pradesh Shadhora (India)
- Coordinates: 24.621277°N 77.592684°E
- Country: India
- State: Madhya Pradesh
- District: Ashoknagar district

Government
  - Type: Janpad Panchayat
  - Body: Council

Population (2011)
  - Total: 73,653

Languages
  - Official: Hindi
- Time zone: UTC+5:30 (IST)
- Postal code (PIN): 473330
- Area code: 07543
- ISO 3166 code: MP-IN
- Vehicle registration: MP 67
- No. of Villages: 108
- Sex ratio: 915

Shadhora tehsil is a fourth-order administrative and revenue division, a subdivision of third-order administrative and revenue division of Ashoknagar district of Madhya Pradesh.

== Geography ==
Shadhora tehsil is bounded by Guna district in the southwest, west, northwest and north, Isagarh tehsil in the northeast and east, Ashoknagar tehsil in the southeast and south.

== See also ==
- Ashoknagar district
