= Khairlanji tehsil =

Khairlanji
- Tehsil
- Location in Madhya Pradesh Khairlanji (India)
- Coordinates: 21.596881°N 79.977945°E
- Country: India
- State: Madhya Pradesh
- District: Balaghat district

Government
  - Type: Janpad Panchayat
  - Body: Council

Area
  - Total: 459.40 km^{2} (177.38 sq mi)

Population (2011)
  - Total: 147,208

Languages
  - Official: Hindi
- Time zone: UTC+5:30 (IST)
- Postal code (PIN): 481337
- Area code: 07633
- ISO 3166 code: MP-IN
- Vehicle registration: MP 50
- No. of Villages: 84
- Sex ratio: 1027

Khairlanji tehsil is a fourth-order administrative and revenue division, a subdivision of third-order administrative and revenue division of Balaghat district of Madhya Pradesh.

== Geography ==
Khairlanji tehsil has an area of 459.40 sqkilometers. It is bounded by Tirodi tehsil in the west and northwest, Katangi tehsil in the north, Waraseoni tehsil in the northeast, Kirnapur tehsil in the east and Maharashtra in the southeast, south and southwest.

== See also ==
- Balaghat district
