= Bhanpura tehsil =

- Tehsil
- Location in Madhya Pradesh Bhanpura tehsil (India)
- Coordinates: 24.52°N 75.73°E
- Country: India
- State: Madhya Pradesh
- District: mandsaur district

Government
  - Type: Janpad Panchayat
  - Body: Council

Population (2022)
  - Total: 193,660

Languages
  - Official: Hindi
- Time zone: UTC+5:30 (IST)
- ISO 3166 code: MP-IN

Bhanpura tehsil is a tehsil in Mandsaur district, Madhya Pradesh, India. It is also a subdivision of the administrative and revenue division of ujjain district of Madhya Pradesh.

== Demographics ==
As of 2011, the tehsil had a population of 151,297.
