= Berasia tehsil =

- Tehsil
- Location in Madhya Pradesh Berasia tehsil (India)
- Coordinates: 23.636762°N 77.430687°E
- Country: India
- State: Madhya Pradesh
- District: Bhopal district

Government
  - Type: Janpad Panchayat
  - Body: Council

Languages
  - Official: Hindi
- Time zone: UTC+5:30 (IST)
- Postal code (PIN): 463106
- ISO 3166 code: MP-IN

Berasia tehsil is a tehsil in bhopal district, Madhya Pradesh, India. It is also a subdivision of the administrative and revenue division of bhopal district of Madhya Pradesh. Assembly constituency is Berasia.
