= Zirapur tehsil =

- Tehsil
- Location in Madhya Pradesh Zirapur tehsil (India)
- Coordinates: 24.02°N 76.38°E
- Country: India
- State: Madhya Pradesh
- District: Rajgarh district

Government
  - Type: Janpad Panchayat
  - Body: Council

Area
  - Total: 845.36 km^{2} (326.40 sq mi)

Population (2011)
  - Total: 199,675

Languages
  - Official: Hindi
- Time zone: UTC+5:30 (IST)
- Postal code (PIN): 465691
- ISO 3166 code: MP-IN

Zirapur is a tehsil in Rajgarh district, Madhya Pradesh, India.

== Demographics ==
As of the 2011 census of India, it had a population of 199,675 across 220 villages.
