= Anjad tehsil =

Anjad
- Tehsil
- Location in Madhya Pradesh Anjad (India)
- Coordinates: 22.043094°N 75.053814°E
- Country: India
- State: Madhya Pradesh
- District: Barwani district

Government
  - Type: Janpad Panchayat
  - Body: Council

Area
  - Total: 15.54 km^{2} (6.00 sq mi)

Population (2011)
  - Total: 89,465

Languages
  - Official: Hindi
- Time zone: UTC+5:30 (IST)
- Postal code (PIN): 451556
- Area code: 07284
- ISO 3166 code: MP-IN
- Vehicle registration: MP 46
- No. of Villages: 46
- Sex ratio: 975

Anjad tehsil is a fourth-order administrative and revenue division, a subdivision of third-order administrative and revenue division of Barwani district of Madhya Pradesh.

== Geography ==
Anjad tehsil has an area of 15.54 sq kilometers. It is bounded by Dhar district in the northwest and north, Thikri tehsil in the northeast and east, Rajpur tehsil in the southeast, south and southwest and Barwani tehsil in the west.

== See also ==
- Barwani district
