= Giandomenico Coleti =

Italian Jesuit

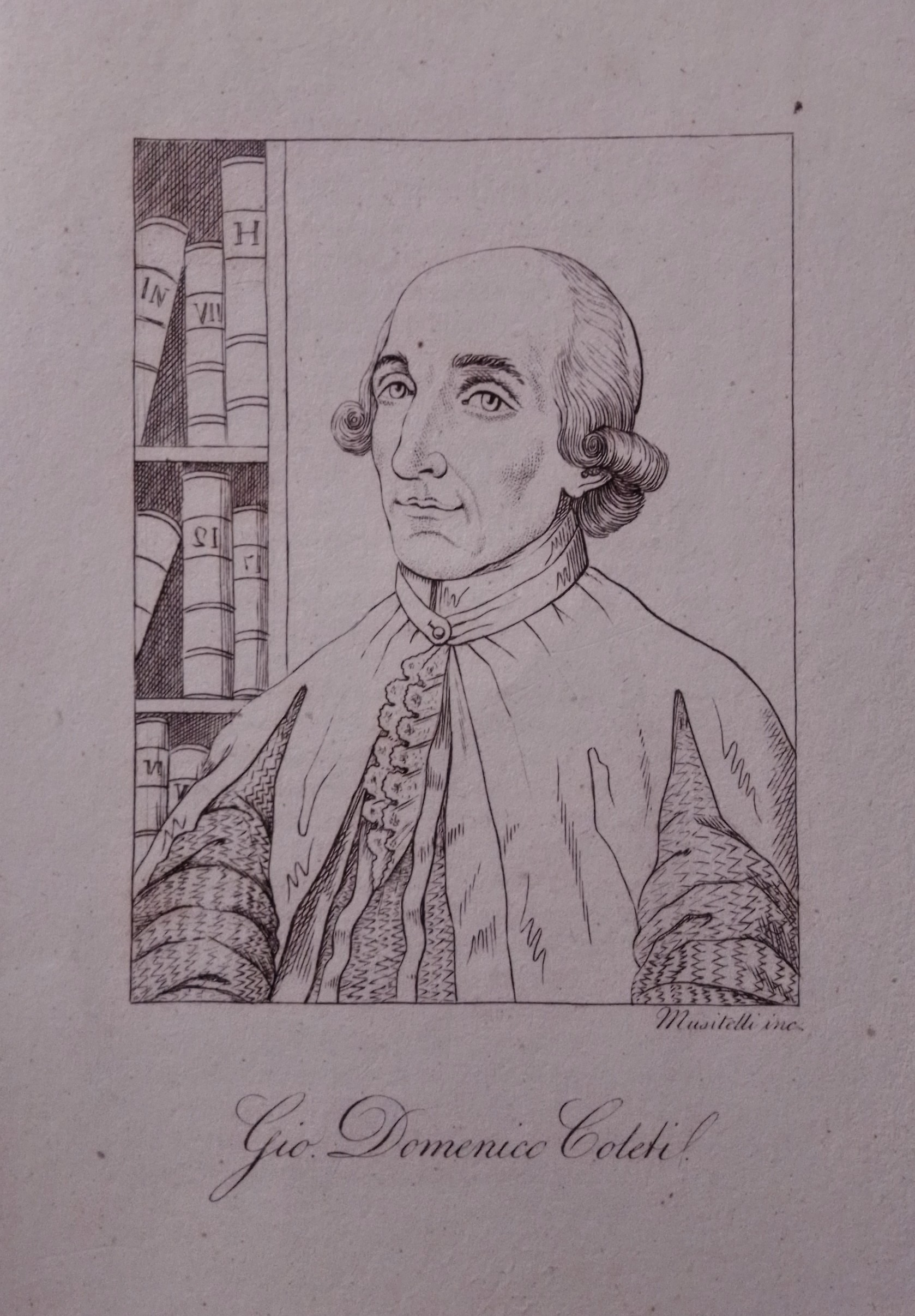

Giovanni Domenico Coleti or Giandomenico Coleti (5 October 1727 – 5 January 1798) was an Italian Jesuit who worked in Central and South America and wrote about the history, geography and culture of the region and its people.

== Life and work ==
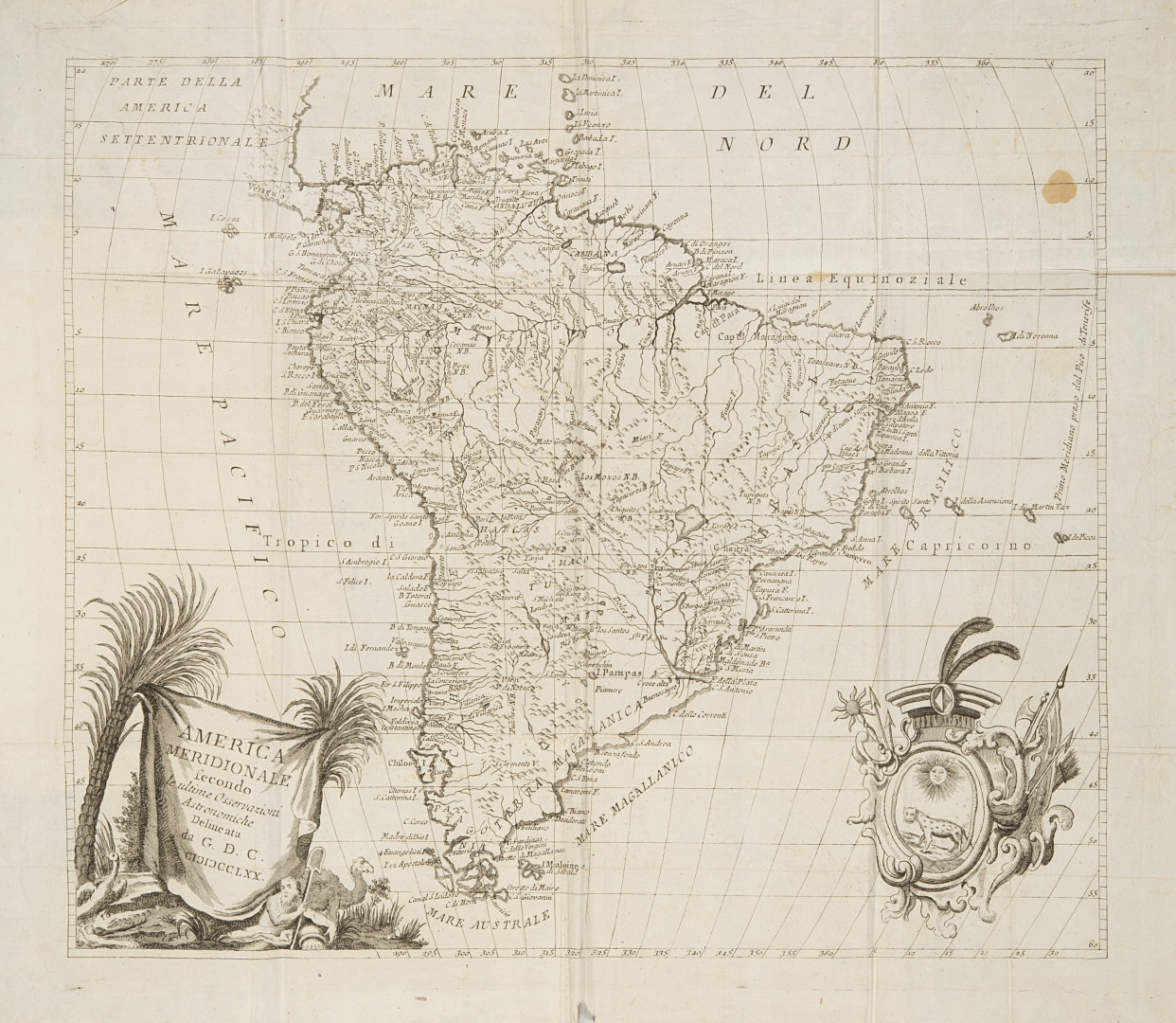
Map of America produced by Coleti

Coleti was born in Venice to Sebastiano and Marina Corradini Dall'Aglio and joined the Jesuit College at Ravenna, where he studied under the Latinist Camillo Berardi. He took his oath to joined the Society of Jesus and then left to South America along with fellow Jesuits Carlo Brentano and Nicolò Della Torre. He reached Cartagena in 1755 and then moved to Panama and Guayaquil. He later moved to Latacunga and then Quito, where he completed his studies and began to learn Spanish. He taught at Quito, reorganized a library and began to research the region.

In 1767, Charles III passed a decree to expel Jesuits and he left for Europe. He moved to Livorno and began to work towards publishing his researches, however his Vite de l'Inca Imperatori was unpublished and is lost.

In 1771, he published a geographical dictionary of Latin America. He lived in Venice where he taught moral theology at the Tivoli college until the Society of Jesus was suppressed in 1773 by Clement XIV. He then went to Bagnacavallo and worked for Count Gaetano Ginanni of Ravenna as a secretary. In 1778 he published Luciferi episcopi Calaritani opera omnia quae extant along with Iacopo. He moved back to Venice due to poor health and lived there until his death.
