= Chanderi tehsil =

Chanderi
- Tehsil
- Location in Madhya Pradesh Chanderi (India)
- Coordinates: 24.712834°N 78.136489°E
- Country: India
- State: Madhya Pradesh
- District: Ashoknagar district

Government
  - Type: Janpad Panchayat
  - Body: Council

Area
  - Total: 1,029.79 km^{2} (397.60 sq mi)

Population (2011)
  - Total: 158,330

Languages
  - Official: Hindi
- Time zone: UTC+5:30 (IST)
- Postal code (PIN): 473446
- Area code: 07547
- ISO 3166 code: MP-IN
- Vehicle registration: MP 67
- No. of Villages: 165
- Sex ratio: 906

Chanderi tehsil is a fourth-order administrative and revenue division, a subdivision of third-order administrative and revenue division of Ashoknagar district of Madhya Pradesh.

== Geography ==
Chanderi tehsil has an area of 1029.79 sq kilometers. It is bounded by Isagarh tehsil in the west and northwest, Shivpuri district in the north, Uttarpradesh in the northeast, east and southeast, Mungaoli tehsil in the south, Ashoknagar tehsil in the southwest.

== See also ==
- Ashoknagar district
