= Paraswada tehsil =

Paraswada
- Tehsil
- Location in Madhya Pradesh Paraswada (India)
- Coordinates: 22.176388°N 80.297632°E
- Country: India
- State: Madhya Pradesh
- District: Balaghat district

Government
  - Type: Janpad Panchayat
  - Body: Council

Area
  - Total: 590.53 km^{2} (228.00 sq mi)

Population (2011)
  - Total: 108,026

Languages
  - Official: Hindi
- Time zone: UTC+5:30 (IST)
- Postal code (PIN): 481556
- Area code: 07634
- ISO 3166 code: MP-IN
- Vehicle registration: MP 50
- No. of Villages: 173
- Sex ratio: 1036

Paraswada tehsil is a fourth-order administrative and revenue division, a subdivision of third-order administrative and revenue division of Balaghat district of Madhya Pradesh.

== Geography ==
Paraswada tehsil has an area of 590.53 sq kilometers. It is bounded by Balaghat tehsil in the southwest, west and northwest, Mandla district in the north and northwest, Baihar tehsil in the east and southeast and Kirnapur tehsil in the south.

== See also ==
- Balaghat district
