= Pati tehsil =

Pati
- Tehsil
- Location in Madhya Pradesh Pati (India)
- Coordinates: 21.940682°N 74.747046°E
- Country: India
- State: Madhya Pradesh
- District: Barwani district

Government
  - Type: Janpad Panchayat
  - Body: Council

Area
  - Total: 669.80 km^{2} (258.61 sq mi)

Population (2011)
  - Total: 162,432

Languages
  - Official: Hindi
- Time zone: UTC+5:30 (IST)
- Postal code (PIN): 451661
- Area code: 07290
- ISO 3166 code: MP-IN
- Vehicle registration: MP 46
- No. of Villages: 111
- Sex ratio: 986

Pati tehsil is a fourth-order administrative and revenue division, a subdivision of third-order administrative and revenue division of Barwani district of Madhya Pradesh.

== Geography ==
Pati tehsil has an area of 669.80 sq kilometers. It is bounded by Alirajpur district in the northwest, Dhar district in the north, Barwani tehsil in the northeast, east and southeast, Pansemal tehsil in the south and southwest and Maharashtra in the west.

== See also ==
- Barwani district
