= Baihar tehsil =

Baihar
- Tehsil
- Location in Madhya Pradesh Baihar (India)
- Coordinates: 22.101223°N 80.549401°E
- Country: India
- State: Madhya Pradesh
- District: Balaghat district

Government
  - Type: Janpad Panchayat
  - Body: Council

Area
  - Total: 910.50 km^{2} (351.55 sq mi)

Population (2011)
  - Total: 284,352

Languages
  - Official: Hindi
- Time zone: UTC+5:30 (IST)
- Postal code (PIN): 481111
- Area code: 07636
- ISO 3166 code: MP-IN
- Vehicle registration: MP 50
- No. of Villages: 330
- Sex ratio: 1027

Baihar tehsil is a fourth-order administrative and revenue division, a subdivision of third-order administrative and revenue division of Balaghat district of Madhya Pradesh.

== Geography ==
Baihar tehsil has an area of 910.50 sq kilometers. It is bounded by Mandla district in the northwest and north, Chhattisgarh in the northeast, east and southeast, Lanji tehsil in the south, Kirnapur tehsil in the southwest, Paraswada tehsil in the west.

== See also ==
- Balaghat district
