= Pachore tehsil =

- Tehsil
- Location in Madhya Pradesh Pachore tehsil (India)
- Coordinates: 23.42°N 76.43°E
- Country: India
- State: Madhya Pradesh
- District: Raisen district

Government
  - Type: Janpad Panchayat
  - Body: Council

Languages
  - Official: Hindi
- Time zone: UTC+5:30 (IST)
- Postal code (PIN): 465683
- ISO 3166 code: MP-IN

Pachore tehsil is a tehsil in Rajgarh district, Madhya Pradesh, India. It is also a subdivision of the administrative and revenue division of bhopal district of Madhya Pradesh.
