= Sauser =

Sauser is a surname. Notable people with the surname include:

- Christoph Sauser (born 1976), Swiss cross-country mountain biker
- Ekkart Sauser (1933–2019), Austrian Roman Catholic priest, theologian, and church historian
