= Thikri tehsil =

Thikri
- Tehsil
- Location in Madhya Pradesh Thikri (India)
- Coordinates: 22.070718°N 75.394656°E
- Country: India
- State: Madhya Pradesh
- District: Barwani district

Government
  - Type: Janpad Panchayat
  - Body: Council

Area
  - Total: 575.64 km^{2} (222.26 sq mi)

Population (2011)
  - Total: 79,054

Languages
  - Official: Hindi
- Time zone: UTC+5:30 (IST)
- Postal code (PIN): 451660
- Area code: 07284
- ISO 3166 code: MP-IN
- Vehicle registration: MP 46
- No. of Villages: 56
- Sex ratio: 951

Thikri tehsil is a fourth-order administrative and revenue division, a subdivision of third-order administrative and revenue division of Barwani district of Madhya Pradesh.

== Geography ==
Thikri tehsil has an area of 575.64 sq kilometers. It is bounded by Dhar district in the northwest and north, Khargone district in the northeast, east and southeast, Rajpur tehsil in the south and Anjad tehsil in the southwest and west.

== See also ==
- Barwani district
