= Warla, Madhya Pradesh =

Warla
- village
- Location in Madhya Pradesh, India Warla (India)
- Coordinates: 21.43°N 75.17°E
- Country: India
- State: Madhya Pradesh
- District: Barwani

Languages
  - Official: Hindi
- Time zone: UTC+5:30 (IST)
- ISO 3166 code: IN-MP
- Vehicle registration: MP

Warla is a village in Barwani district in the Indian state of Madhya Pradesh. It is the headquarters of Warla tehsil.

== Geography ==
Warla is located in the Tapti Valley, at 21.43°N 75.17°E. It has an average elevation of 271 m (889 ft). Situated on the border of Madhya Pradesh and Maharashtra, Warla lies 41 km (25 mi) from Sendhwa. It is a Tehsil of Barwani district.

== Transport ==
The nearest airport is indore.
