= Alessandro Zorzi =

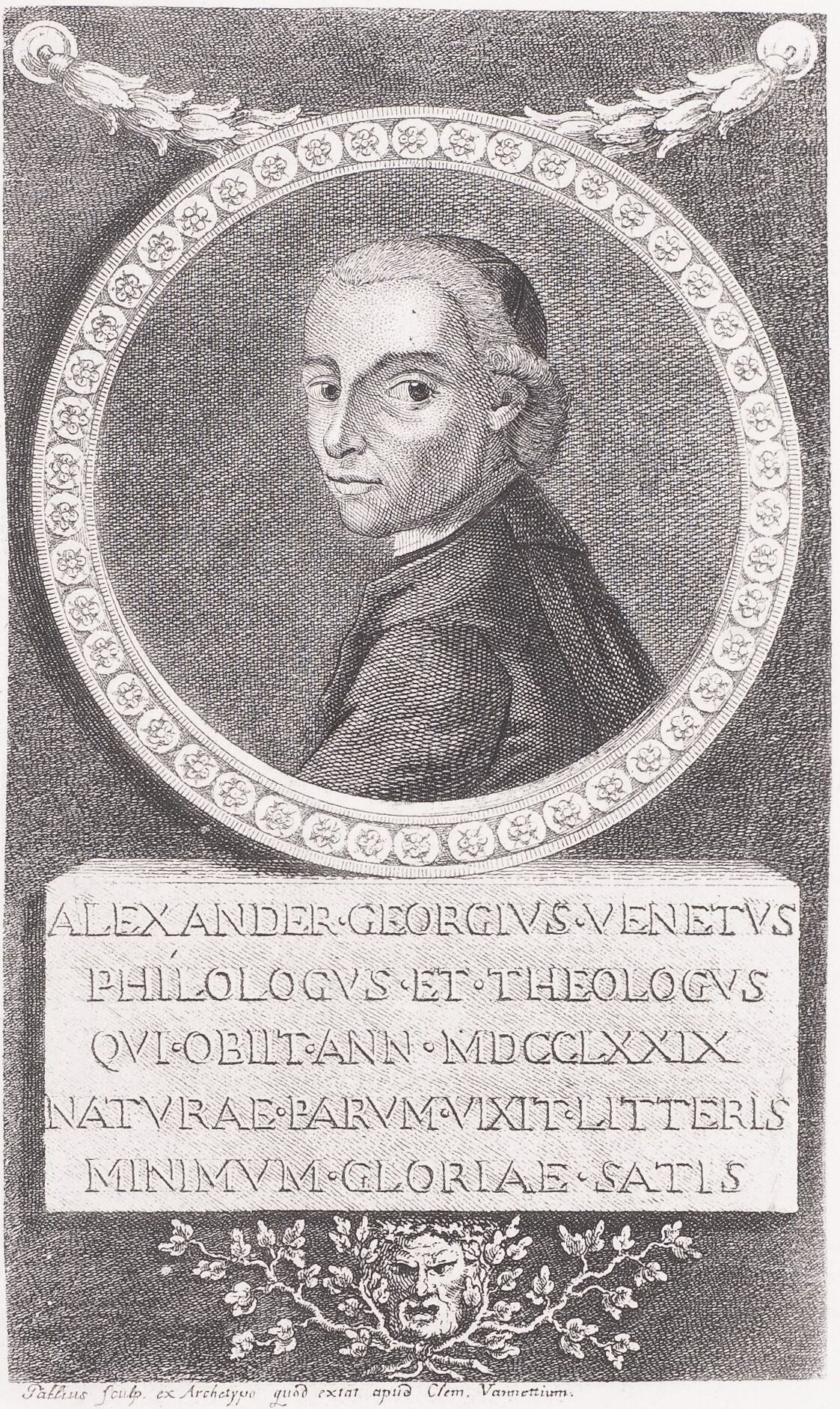

Alessandro Zorzi in Latin as Alexander Georgius (11 September 1747 – 14 July 1779) was an Italian Jesuit theologian and was a promoter of an Italian encyclopedia project called the Nuova enciclopedia italiana. He collected geographical information and the itineraries of early African travellers.

Zorzi was born in Venice and taught theology at the college of Saint Lucia in Bologna in 1772. Following the suppression of the institute, he moved to Ferrara to teach the nephews of Cristino Bevilacqua. He began an Italian encyclopedia project similar to that of Diderot and promoted the idea around 1775 but he died in Ferrara, at the age of 31. He collected literature on the geography of Ethiopia and the itineraries of travellers to Africa between 1400 and 1524.
