= Pansemal tehsil =

Pansemal
- Tehsil
- Location in Madhya Pradesh Pansemal (India)
- Coordinates: 21.658194°N 74.697126°E
- Country: India
- State: Madhya Pradesh
- District: Barwani district

Government
  - Type: Janpad Panchayat
  - Body: Council

Area
  - Total: 365.11 km^{2} (140.97 sq mi)

Population (2011)
  - Total: 157,975

Languages
  - Official: Hindi
- Time zone: UTC+5:30 (IST)
- Postal code (PIN): 451770
- Area code: 07286
- ISO 3166 code: MP-IN
- Vehicle registration: MP 46
- No. of Villages: 103
- Sex ratio: 986

Pansemal tehsil is a fourth-order administrative and revenue division, a subdivision of third-order administrative and revenue division of Barwani district of Madhya Pradesh.

== Geography ==
Pansemal tehsil has an area of 365.11 sq kilometers. It is bounded by Maharashtra in the northwest, west, southwest and south, Pati tehsil in the north, Barwani tehsil in the northeast and Niwali tehsil in the east and southeast.

Pansemal and Khetia is a centre for industry. Other places of note include:

- The ancient fort of Ramgarh (Ramgad) is located in the Satpura Range, 17 km from Pansemal.
- Ancient Bandhareshwar Temple and Jharna (Waterfall) is located in Bandhara Buzurg Village, 8 km from Pansemal.
- Jalgone Fort and Tin Taal Bawadi (Well) is located in Jagone Village, 4 km from Pansemal.

== Notable people ==
- Bala Bachchan (Former Home Minister)
