= Nasrullaganj tehsil =

- Tehsil
- Location in Madhya Pradesh Nasrullaganj tehsil (India)
- Coordinates: 22.684978°N 77.271738°E
- Country: India
- State: Madhya Pradesh
- District: Sehore district

Government
  - Type: Janpad Panchayat
  - Body: Council

Languages
  - Official: Hindi
- Time zone: UTC+5:30 (IST)
- Postal code (PIN): 466331
- Area code: 07563
- ISO 3166 code: MP-IN
- Vehicle registration: MP 37

Nasrullaganj is a tehsil in Sehore district, Madhya Pradesh, India. It is also a subdivision of the administrative and revenue division of Sehore district of Madhya Pradesh. It is represented in the Madhya Pradesh Legislative Assembly by the Budhni Assembly constituency.
