= Sultanpur tehsil =

- Tehsil
- Location in Madhya Pradesh Sultanpur tehsil (India)
- Coordinates: 23.150000°N 77.930000°E
- Country: India
- State: Madhya Pradesh
- District: Raisen district

Government
  - Type: Janpad Panchayat
  - Body: Council

Languages
  - Official: Hindi
- Time zone: UTC+5:30 (IST)
- Postal code (PIN): 464886
- ISO 3166 code: MP-IN

Sultanpur tehsil is a tehsil in Raisen district, Madhya Pradesh, India. It is also a subdivision of the administrative and revenue division of Bhopal district of Madhya Pradesh.
