= Jhirniya =

- village
- Location within Madhya Pradesh Location within India
- Coordinates: 23.352865°N 77.239004°E
- Country: India
- State: Madhya Pradesh
- District: Bhopal
- Tehsil: Berasia

Population (2011)
  - Total: 962
- Time zone: UTC+5:30 (IST)
- PIN: 462030
- ISO 3166 code: MP-IN
- Census code: 482106

Jhirniya is a village in the Bhopal district of Madhya Pradesh, India. It is located in the Berasia tehsil.

== Demographics ==
According to the 2011 census of India, Jhirniya has 197 households. The effective literacy rate (i.e. the literacy rate of population excluding children aged 6 and below) is 59.3%.

Demographics (2011 Census)
	Total	Male	Female
Population	962	498	464
Children aged below 6 years	161	68	93
Scheduled caste	386	199	187
Scheduled tribe	0	0	0
Literates	475	315	160
Workers (all)	505	266	239
Main workers (total)	337	181	156
Main workers: Cultivators	158	112	46
Main workers: Agricultural labourers	166	60	106
Main workers: Household industry workers	2	1	1
Main workers: Other	11	8	3
Marginal workers (total)	168	85	83
Marginal workers: Cultivators	27	21	6
Marginal workers: Agricultural labourers	84	39	45
Marginal workers: Household industry workers	5	4	1
Marginal workers: Others	52	21	31
Non-workers	457	232	225
