= Badoda =

- city
- Location in Madhya Pradesh, India Badoda (India)
- Coordinates: 25.50°N 76.65°E
- Country: India
- State: Madhya Pradesh
- District: Sheopur

Population (2001)
  - Total: 15,672

Languages
  - Official: Hindi
- Time zone: UTC+5:30 (IST)
- ISO 3166 code: IN-MP
- Vehicle registration: MP

Badoda is a city and a municipality in Sheopur district in the state of Madhya Pradesh, India. It's also a Tehsil Headquarter.

== Geography ==
Badoda is located on 25.50°N 76.65°E. It has an average elevation of 229 metres (751 feet). It comes under the Vindhya series.

== Demographics ==
As of 2001 India census, Badoda had a population of 15,672. Males constitute 53% of the population and females 47%. Badoda has an average literacy rate of 48%, lower than the national average of 59.5%; with 67% of the males and 33% of females literate. 19% of the population is under 6 years of age.

== Place to Interest ==
Badoda Fort, There is a fort situated in the middle of Baroda city which has its own historical importance in the city. Sheesh Mahal, Hawa Mahal and Shankar Mahal are worth seeing in the fort.
