= Waraseoni tehsil =

Waraseoni
- Tehsil
- Location in Madhya Pradesh Waraseoni (India)
- Coordinates: 21.765401°N 80.059080°E
- Country: India
- State: Madhya Pradesh
- District: Balaghat district

Government
  - Type: Janpad Panchayat
  - Body: Council

Area
  - Total: 465.02 km^{2} (179.55 sq mi)

Population (2011)
  - Total: 176,291

Languages
  - Official: Hindi
- Time zone: UTC+5:30 (IST)
- Postal code (PIN): 481331
- Area code: 07633
- ISO 3166 code: MP-IN
- Vehicle registration: MP 50
- No. of Villages: 78
- Sex ratio: 1019

Waraseoni tehsil is a fourth-order administrative and revenue division, a subdivision of third-order administrative and revenue division of Balaghat district of Madhya Pradesh.

== Geography ==
Waraseoni tehsil has an area of 465.02 sq kilometers. It is bounded by Lalbarra tehsil in the northwest and north, Balaghat tehsil in the northeast, Kirnapur tehsil in the east and southeast and Khairlanji tehsil in the south and southwest and Katangi tehsil in the west.

== See also ==
- Balaghat district
