= Mungaoli tehsil =

Mungaoli
- Tehsil
- Location in Madhya Pradesh Mungaoli (India)
- Coordinates: 24.414076°N 78.093717°E
- Country: India
- State: Madhya Pradesh
- District: Ashoknagar district

Government
  - Type: Janpad Panchayat
  - Body: Council

Area
  - Total: 1,211.58 km^{2} (467.79 sq mi)

Population (2011)
  - Total: 221,572

Languages
  - Official: Hindi
- Time zone: UTC+5:30 (IST)
- Postal code (PIN): 473443
- Area code: 07548
- ISO 3166 code: MP-IN
- Vehicle registration: MP 67
- No. of Villages: 251
- Sex ratio: 892

Mungaoli tehsil is a fourth-order administrative and revenue division, a subdivision of third-order administrative and revenue division of Ashoknagar district of Madhya Pradesh.

== Geography ==
Mungaoli tehsil has an area of 1211.58 sq kilometers. It is bounded by Ashoknagar tehsil in the southwest, west and northwest, Chanderi tehsil in the north, Uttarpradesh in the northeast, Sagar district in the east and southeast and Vidisha district in the south.

== See also ==
- Ashoknagar district
