= Katangi tehsil =

Katangi
- Tehsil
- Location in Madhya Pradesh Katangi (India)
- Coordinates: 21.770464°N 79.804459°E
- Country: India
- State: Madhya Pradesh
- District: Balaghat district

Government
  - Type: Janpad Panchayat
  - Body: Council

Area
  - Total: 580.73 km^{2} (224.22 sq mi)

Population (2011)
  - Total: 102,594

Languages
  - Official: Hindi
- Time zone: UTC+5:30 (IST)
- Postal code (PIN): 481445
- Area code: 07630
- ISO 3166 code: MP-IN
- Vehicle registration: MP 50
- No. of Villages: 60
- Sex ratio: 1028

Katangi tehsil is a fourth-order administrative and revenue division, a subdivision of third-order administrative and revenue division of Balaghat district of Madhya Pradesh.

== Geography ==
Katangi tehsil has an area of 580.73 sqkilometers. It is bounded by Seoni district in the southwest, west, northwest and north, Lalbarra tehsil in the northeast, Waraseoni tehsil in the east, Khairlanji tehsil in the southeast and Tirodi tehsil in the south.

== See also ==
- Balaghat district
- K. D. Deshmukh
- Tamlal Sahare
