= Karahal =

Town in Madhya Pradesh, India

- Town
- Location in Madhya Pradesh, India
- Coordinates: 25.49°N 77.05°E
- Country: India
- State: Madhya Pradesh
- District: Sheopur District

Languages
  - Official: Hindi
- PIN: 476355
- Vehicle registration: MP-31

Karahal is a small town in Sheopur district in the Indian state of Madhya Pradesh. It's a Tehsil Headquarter and a Sub Division in District.

Karahal is located on 25°29′N 77°03′E. It is about 44 km from Sheopur city and 165 km from Gwalior city.

As per Census of India 2011 Karahal town has population of 12,790 of which 6 672 are males while 6,118 are females. Average Sex Ratio of Karahal town is 917.
