= Lalbarra tehsil =

Lalbarra
- Tehsil
- Location in Madhya Pradesh Lalbarra (India)
- Coordinates: 21.938849°N 80.050698°E
- Country: India
- State: Madhya Pradesh
- District: Balaghat district

Government
  - Type: Janpad Panchayat
  - Body: Council

Area
  - Total: 502.62 km^{2} (194.06 sq mi)

Population (2011)
  - Total: 170,960

Languages
  - Official: Hindi
- Time zone: UTC+5:30 (IST)
- Postal code (PIN): 481441
- Area code: 07633
- ISO 3166 code: MP-IN
- Vehicle registration: MP 50
- No. of Villages: 110
- Sex ratio: 1015

Lalbarra tehsil is a fourth-order administrative and revenue division, a subdivision of third-order administrative and revenue division of Balaghat district of Madhya Pradesh.

== Geography ==
Lalbarra tehsil has an area of 502.62 sq kilometers. It is bounded by Seoni district in the west, northwest and north, Balaghat tehsil in the northeast, east and southeast, Waraseoni tehsil in the south and Katangi tehsil in the southwest. Water for agriculture is provided from the Dhuty Dam.

== See also ==
- Balaghat district
