= Ashoknagar tehsil =

Ashoknagar
- Tehsil
- Location in Madhya Pradesh Ashoknagar (India)
- Coordinates: 24.577515°N 77.731849°E
- Country: India
- State: Madhya Pradesh
- District: Ashoknagar district

Government
  - Type: Janpad Panchayat
  - Body: Council

Area
  - Total: 1,237.82 km^{2} (477.92 sq mi)

Population (2011)
  - Total: 215,267

Languages
  - Official: Hindi
- Time zone: UTC+5:30 (IST)
- Postal code (PIN): 473331
- Area code: 07543
- ISO 3166 code: MP-IN
- Vehicle registration: MP 67
- No. of Villages: 187
- Sex ratio: 907

Ashoknagar tehsil is a fourth-order administrative and revenue division, a subdivision of the third-order administrative and revenue division of Ashoknagar district of Madhya Pradesh.

== Geography ==
Ashoknagar tehsil has an area of 1237.82 sq kilometers. It is bounded by Shadhora tehsil in the northwest, Isagarh tehsil in the north, Chanderi tehsil in the northeast, Mungaoli tehsil in the east and southeast, Vidisha district in the south and Guna district in the southwest and west.

== See also ==
- Ashoknagar district
