= Lateri =

- Town
- Location in Madhya Pradesh, India Lateri (India)
- Coordinates: 24°3′26″N 77°24′38″E
- Country: India
- State: Madhya Pradesh
- District: Vidisha

Government
  - Member of the Legislative Assembly: Ayush
  - Chairperson of Municipal Corporation: Abhishek

Population (2011)
  - Total: 30,000 approx

Languages
  - Official: Hindi
- Time zone: UTC+5:30 (IST)
- PIN: 464114
- Telephone code: 91-7590
- Vehicle registration: MP-40

Lateri is a town and a nagar panchayat in Vidisha district in the Indian state of Madhya Pradesh.

== Demographics ==
As of the 2011 Census of India, Lateri had a population of 30,000. Males constitute 53% of the population and females 47%. Lateri has an average literacy rate of 50%, lower than the national average of 59.5%: male literacy is 59%, and female literacy is 39%. In Lateri, 18% of the population is under 6 years of age.

== Politics ==
Laxmikant Sharma was chosen four times consecutively as BJP M.L.A. from Sironj-Lateri constituency but he lost to Gowardhan Upadhyay an INC candidate in assembly elections of 2013.
