= Nateran =

Town in Madhya Pradesh, India

- Town
- Location in Madhya Pradesh Nateran (India)
- Coordinates: 23.682369°N 77.907488°E
- Country: India
- State: Madhya Pradesh
- District: Vidisha district

Government
  - Type: Janpad Panchayat
  - Body: Council

Nateran is a small town in the Vidisha District of Madhya Pradesh, India. Its a tehsil in the Vidisha district.

Nateran had a population of 4,742 as of the 2011 census.

It is 35 km away from the district headquarters. The region is predominantly agrarian. Its main agriculture product is soybeans.
