= Malhargarh tehsil =

- Tehsil
- Location in Madhya Pradesh Malhargarh tehsil (India)
- Coordinates: 24.073392°N 75.068694°E
- Country: India
- State: Madhya Pradesh
- District: mandsaur district

Government
  - Type: Janpad Panchayat
  - Body: Council

Languages
  - Official: Hindi
- Time zone: UTC+5:30 (IST)
- ISO 3166 code: MP-IN

Malhargarh tehsil is a tehsil in Mandsaur district, Madhya Pradesh, India. It is also a subdivision of the administrative and revenue division of ujjain district of Madhya Pradesh.
