= Balaghat tehsil =

Balaghat
- Tehsil
- Location in Madhya Pradesh Balaghat (India)
- Coordinates: 21.812876°N 80.183829°E
- Country: India
- State: Madhya Pradesh
- District: Balaghat district

Government
  - Type: Janpad Panchayat
  - Body: Council

Area
  - Total: 638.99 km^{2} (246.72 sq mi)

Population (2011)
  - Total: 269,352

Languages
  - Official: Hindi
- Time zone: UTC+5:30 (IST)
- Postal code (PIN): 481001
- Area code: 07632
- ISO 3166 code: MP-IN
- Vehicle registration: MP 50
- No. of Villages: 166
- Sex ratio: 1015

Balaghat tehsil is a fourth-order administrative and revenue division, a subdivision of third-order administrative and revenue division of Balaghat district of Madhya Pradesh.

== Geography ==
Balaghat tehsil has an area of 638.99 sq kilometers. It is bounded by Mandla district in the north, Paraswada tehsil in the northeast, east and southeast, Kirnapur tehsil in the south, Waraseoni tehsil in the southwest, Lalbarra tehsil in the west and Seoni district in the northwest.

== See also ==
- Balaghat district
