= Barwani tehsil =

Barwani
- Tehsil
- Location in Madhya Pradesh Barwani (India)
- Coordinates: 22.036316°N 74.903339°E
- Country: India
- State: Madhya Pradesh
- District: Barwani district

Government
  - Type: Janpad Panchayat
  - Body: Council

Area
  - Total: 501.69 km^{2} (193.70 sq mi)

Population (2011)
  - Total: 211,061

Languages
  - Official: Hindi
- Time zone: UTC+5:30 (IST)
- Postal code (PIN): 451551
- Area code: 07290
- ISO 3166 code: MP-IN
- Vehicle registration: MP 46
- No. of Villages: 99
- Sex ratio: 974

Barwani tehsil is a fourth-order administrative and revenue division, a subdivision of third-order administrative and revenue division of Barwani district of Madhya Pradesh.

== Geography ==
Barwani tehsil has an area of 501.69 sq kilometers. It is bounded by Dhar district in the northwest and north, Anjad tehsil in the northeast, Rajpur tehsil in the east and southeast, Niwali tehsil in the south, Pansemal tehsil in the southwest and Pati tehsil in the west.

== See also ==
- Barwani district
