= Isagarh tehsil =

Isagarh
- Tehsil
- Location in Madhya Pradesh Isagarh (India)
- Coordinates: 24.840854°N 77.876744°E
- Country: India
- State: Madhya Pradesh
- District: Ashoknagar district

Government
  - Type: Janpad Panchayat
  - Body: Council

Area
  - Total: 1,100.49 km^{2} (424.90 sq mi)

Population (2011)
  - Total: 176,249

Languages
  - Official: Hindi
- Time zone: UTC+5:30 (IST)
- Postal code (PIN): 473335
- Area code: 07541
- ISO 3166 code: MP-IN
- Vehicle registration: MP 67
- No. of Villages: 188
- Sex ratio: 909

Isagarh tehsil is a fourth-order administrative and revenue division, a subdivision of third-order administrative and revenue division of Ashoknagar district of Madhya Pradesh.

== Geography ==
Isagarh tehsil has an area of 1100.49 sq kilometers. It is bounded by Shivpuri district in the northwest, north and northeast, Chanderi tehsil in the east and southeast, Ashoknagar tehsil in the south and Shadhora tehsil in the southwest and west.

== See also ==
- Ashoknagar district
