= Bhagwat Bhau Nagpure =

Indian politician

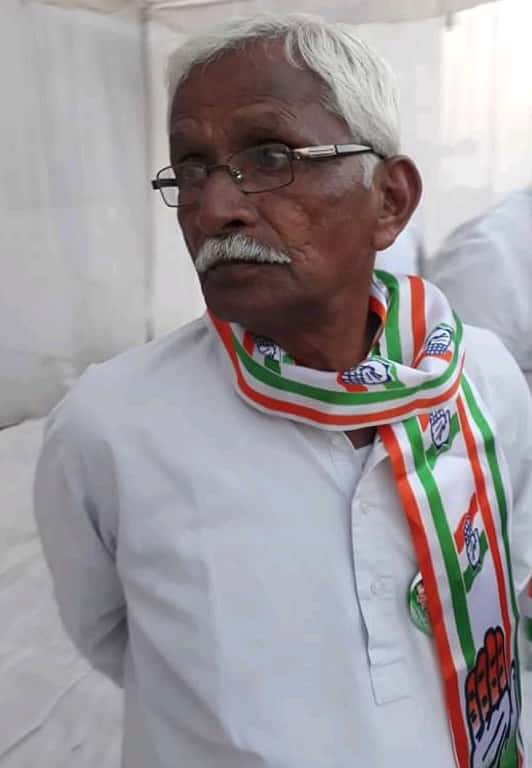
- Bhagwat Bhau Nagpure

Member of the U.S. House of Representatives from Madhya Pradesh
- Constituency: Lanji

Personal details
- Party: Indian National Congress
- Parent: Saduji Nagpure

Bhagwat Bhau Nagpure was the Indian National Congress MLA for Lanji, Balaghat district, Madhya Pradesh, India.
