= Rajpur tehsil =

Rajpur
- Tehsil
- Location in Madhya Pradesh Rajpur (India)
- Coordinates: 21.940149°N 75.135566°E
- Country: India
- State: Madhya Pradesh
- District: Barwani district

Government
  - Type: Janpad Panchayat
  - Body: Council

Area
  - Total: 715.01 km^{2} (276.07 sq mi)

Population (2011)
  - Total: 213,216

Languages
  - Official: Hindi
- Time zone: UTC+5:30 (IST)
- Postal code (PIN): 451447
- Area code: 07284
- ISO 3166 code: MP-IN
- Vehicle registration: MP 46
- No. of Villages: 98
- Sex ratio: 980

Rajpur tehsil is a fourth-order administrative and revenue division, a subdivision of third-order administrative and revenue division of Barwani district of Madhya Pradesh.

== Geography ==
Rajpur tehsil has an area of 715.01 sq kilometers. It is bounded by Barwani tehsil in the southwest, west and northwest, Anjad tehsil in the north, Thikri tehsil in the northeast, Khargone district in the east and southeast and Sendhwa tehsil in the south.

== See also ==
- Barwani district
