= Kirnapur tehsil =

Kirnapur
- Tehsil
- Location in Madhya Pradesh Kirnapur (India)
- Coordinates: 21.623919°N 80.333844°E
- Country: India
- State: Madhya Pradesh
- District: Balaghat district

Government
  - Type: Janpad Panchayat
  - Body: Council

Area
  - Total: 709.49 km^{2} (273.94 sq mi)

Population (2011)
  - Total: 922,732

Languages
  - Official: Hindi
- Time zone: UTC+5:30 (IST)
- Postal code (PIN): 481115
- Area code: 07635
- ISO 3166 code: MP-IN
- Vehicle registration: MP 50
- No. of Villages: 148
- Sex ratio: 1019

Kirnapur tehsil is a fourth-order administrative and revenue division, a subdivision of third-order administrative and revenue division of Balaghat district of Madhya Pradesh.

== Geography ==
Kirnapur tehsil has an area of 709.49 sq kilometers. It is bounded by Balaghat tehsil in the northwest, Paraswada tehsil in the north, Baihar tehsil in the northeast and east, Lanji tehsil in the southeast, Maharashtra in the south and southwest and Waraseoni tehsil in the west.

== See also ==
- Balaghat district
