= Hina Kaware =

Indian politician

MLA Hina Kaware

Deputy Speaker of Madhya Pradesh Legislative Assembly
- In office 10 January 2019 – 22 March 2020
- Preceded by: Rajendra Kumar Singh, INC

Member of the Legislative Assembly, Madhya Pradesh
- In office 2013–2023

Personal details
- Born: 12 November 1982 (age 43) Teh. Kirnapur, Balaghat
- Party: INC (Indian National Congress)
- Education: PhD
- Profession: Politician
- As of 27 July 2018, 2018 Source: ["Biography:Kaware, Hina" (PDF). Vidhan Sabha, Madhya Pradesh Legislative Assembly.]

Hina Kaware is an Indian politician and a member of the INC. She has served as the deputy speaker of Madhya Pradesh Legislative Assembly.

== Political career ==
She became an MLA for the first time in 2013. She was among the 58 candidates of INC who won in the assembly election held in 2013 . In 2018, she again won the assembly seat with thumping majority from Lanji (Balaghat) assembly constituency. On 10 January 2019, she was elected as the deputy speaker of the Madhya Pradesh Legislative Assembly.

== See also ==
- 2013 Madhya Pradesh Legislative Assembly election
