= Warla tehsil =

Warla
- Tehsil
- Location in Madhya Pradesh Warla (India)
- Coordinates: 21.432977°N 75.175328°E
- Country: India
- State: Madhya Pradesh
- District: Barwani district

Government
  - Type: Janpad Panchayat
  - Body: Council

Population (2011)
  - Total: 128,721

Languages
  - Official: Hindi
- Time zone: UTC+5:30 (IST)
- Postal code (PIN): 451666
- Area code: 07281
- ISO 3166 code: MP-IN
- Vehicle registration: MP 46
- No. of Villages: 46
- Sex ratio: 951

Warla or Varla tehsil is a fourth-order administrative and revenue division, a subdivision of third-order administrative and revenue division of Barwani district of Madhya Pradesh.

== Geography ==
Warla tehsil is bounded by Sendhwa tehsil in the northwest, north and northeast, Khargone district in the east and southeast, Maharashtra in the south, southwest and west.

== See also ==
- Barwani district
