= Khilchipur Assembly constituency =

Constituency of the Madhya Pradesh legislative assembly in India

Coordinates: 24.04°N 76.58°E

Khilchipur
- Constituency No. 163 for the Madhya Pradesh Legislative Assembly

Constituency details
- Country: India
- Region: Central India
- State: Madhya Pradesh
- District: Rajgarh
- Lok Sabha constituency: Rajgarh
- Established: 1962
- Reservation: None

Member of Legislative Assembly
- 16th Madhya Pradesh Legislative Assembly
- Incumbent Hajarilal Dangi
- Party: Bharatiya Janata Party
- Elected year: 2023
- Preceded by: Priyavrat Singh

Khilchipur Assembly constituency is one of the 230 Vidhan Sabha (Legislative Assembly) constituencies of Madhya Pradesh state in central India.

It is part of Rajgarh district. There are five Vidhan Sabha seats in Rajgarh district and Khilchipur is one of them. It consists of two blocks, Khilchipur and Jirapur, and two small towns Chhapiheda and Machalpur. There are more than around 200 Panchayat in Khilchipur constituency.

== Members of the Legislative Assembly ==
Year	Member	Party
1962	Hari Singh Pawar	Independent politician
1967	Prabhu Dayal	Indian National Congress
1972	Prabhu Dayal	Indian National Congress
1977	Narayan Singh Panwar	Janata Party
1980	Kanhaiyalal Dangi	Indian National Congress
1985	Kanhaiyalal Dangi	Indian National Congress
1990	Poor Singh Pawar	Bharatiya Janata Party
1993	Ramprasad Dangi	Indian National Congress
1998	Hajarilal Dangi	Indian National Congress
2003	Priyavrat Singh	Indian National Congress
2008	Priyavrat Singh	Indian National Congress
2013	Hajarilal Dangi	Bharatiya Janata Party
2018	Priyavrat Singh	Indian National Congress
2023	Hajarilal Dangi	Bharatiya Janata Party

== Election results ==
=== 2023 ===
2023 Madhya Pradesh Legislative Assembly election: Khilchipur
Party	Candidate	Votes	%	±%
BJP	Hajarilal Dangi	105,694	52.2	+12.29
INC	Priyavrat Singh	92,016	45.44	−10.94
NOTA	None of the above	1,114	0.55	−0.13
Majority		13,678	6.76	−9.71
Turnout		202,489	87.22	+0.5
BJP gain from INC		Swing	YES	

=== 2018 ===
2018 Madhya Pradesh Legislative Assembly election: Khilchipur
Party	Candidate	Votes	%	±%
INC	Priyavrat Singh	101,854	56.38	
BJP	Hajarilal Dangi	72,098	39.91	
BSP	Indersingh Varma	1,746	0.97	
NOTA	None of the above	1,230	0.68	
Majority		29,756	16.47	
Turnout		180,671	86.72	
INC gain from BJP		Swing		

=== 2013 ===
2013 Madhya Pradesh Legislative Assembly election: Khilchipur
Party	Candidate	Votes	%	±%
BJP	Hajarilal Dangi	82,712	51.03	
INC	Priyavrat Singh	71233	43.95	
Majority		11479		
Turnout				
BJP gain from INC		Swing		

== See also ==
- Rajgarh district
- List of constituencies of the Madhya Pradesh Legislative Assembly
