= Chhapiheda =

Town in Madhya Pradesh, India

- city
- Location in Madhya Pradesh, India Chhapiheda (India)
- Coordinates: 24.03°N 76.57°E
- Country: India
- State: Madhya Pradesh
- District: Rajgarh
- Elevation: 394 m (1,293 ft)

Population (2011)
  - Total: 8,501

Languages
  - Official: Hindi
- Time zone: UTC+5:30 (IST)
- Postal code: 465679
- ISO 3166 code: IN-MP
- Vehicle registration: MP

Chhapiheda is a Nagar Panchayat city in Rajgarh district of Madhya Pradesh, India. It belongs to Khilchipur Tehsil.

Chhapiheda is divided into 15 wards, for which elections are held every 5 years. Chhapiheda's postal code is 465689.

== Geographics ==
Chhapiheda belongs to Bhopal Division. It is located 40 km away from the district headquarters Rajgarh. National Highway 725C is through here, connecting it to Jirapur Pachore and Aashta.

== Demographics ==
Chhapiheda has a population of 8,501 of which 4,346 are males while 4,155 are females as Census India 2011. The literacy rate of Chhapiheda City is 69.97% higher than the state average of 69.32%. In Chhapiheda, Male literacy is around 81.91% while female literacy rate is 57.63%.

== See also ==
- Khilchipur Assembly constituency
- Khilchipur
- Rajgarh District
