= Jirapur =

- Town
- Location in Madhya Pradesh, India
- Coordinates: 24.02°N 76.38°E
- Country: India
- State: Madhya Pradesh
- District: Rajgarh

Population (2011)
  - Total: 21,724
  - Male: 11,052
  - Female: 10,672
- Time zone: UTC+5:30 (IST)
- Pincode(s): 4656xx
- Area code(s): +91-7370
- Vehicle registration: MP-39

Jirapur is a town and a nagar panchayat in Rajgarh district in the Indian state of Madhya Pradesh. In 2022 Janpad Panchayat election held across Madhya Pradesh, Congress won the election and secure position as a Janpad Adhyaksh under the leadership of Khilchipur vidhayak Shri Kunwer Hajarilal Dangi ji Ji (currently MLA of Khilchipur constituency (2023-2028)). He put all the efforts to win this election and doing great work for Khilchipur constituency. He won 2023 assembly election of Madhya Pradesh with huge margin of 14000+ votes by defeating Priyavart Singh of Congress (Inc) candidate.

Jirapur is a Tehsil and belongs to Bhopal Division. It is located 39 km towards west from district headquarters Rajgarh, 158 km from the state capital of Bhopal from the east.

== Jirapur Tehsil ==
Jirapur Tehsil is bounded by Khilchipur Tehsil towards east, Nalkheda Tehsil towards south, Susner Tehsil towards west, Bakani Tehsil towards the north. Sarangpur City, Shajapur City, Pachore City, Jhalawar City are the nearby Cities to Jirapur. This city is near on MP and Rajasthan border. Jirapur consists of 88 Villages and 88 Panchayats. It is 434 metres in elevation.

For tourists, there are a few places to visit, such as the Balaji Temple, Jirapur dam, the Shiv temple near it, Dug Hanumanji for picnic.

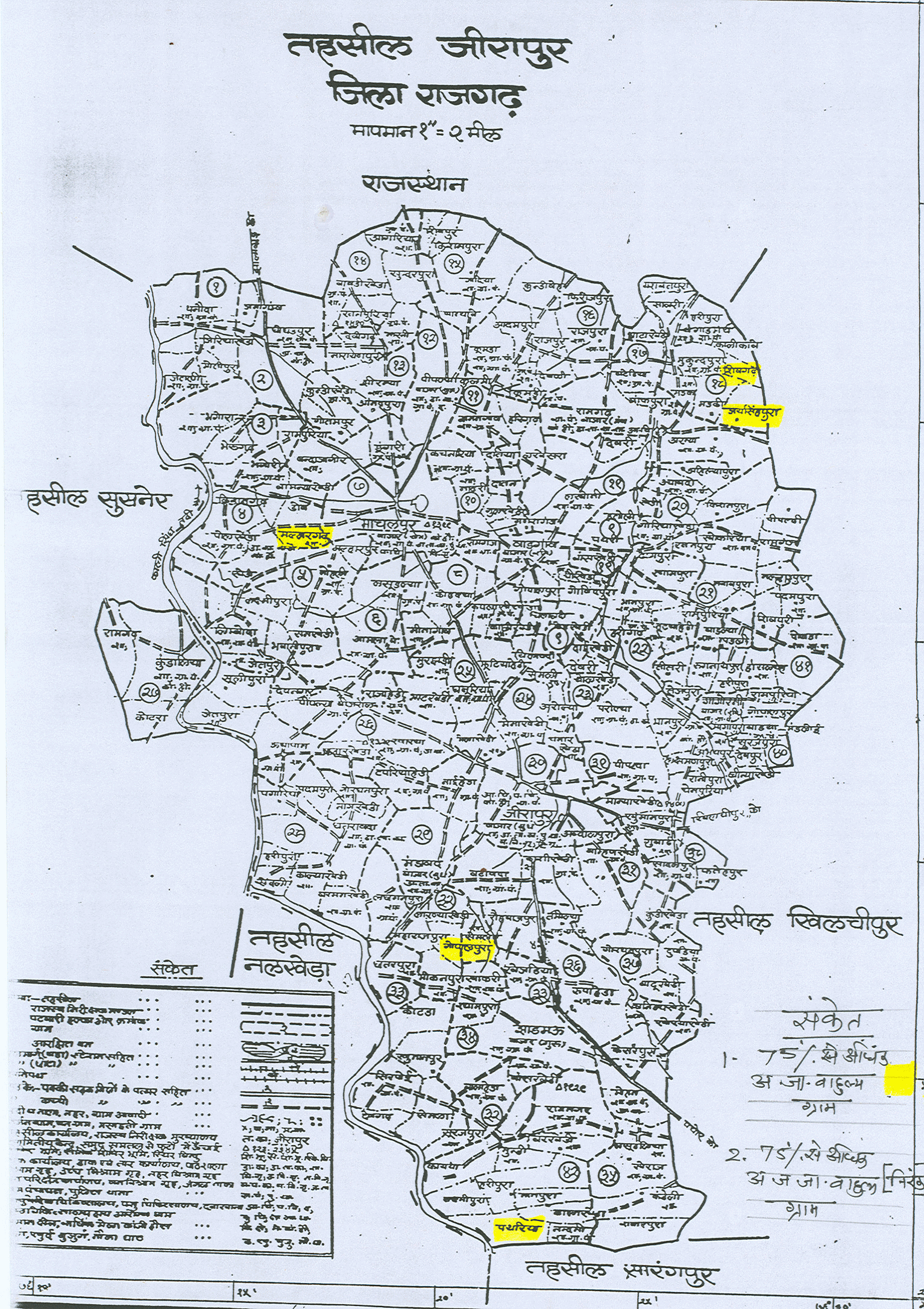
Map of Jirapur Tehsil

== Demographics ==
As of 2011 India census, Jirapur had a population of 21,724. Males constitute 50.87% of the population and females 49.13%. Jirapur has an average literacy rate of 77.23%, higher than the national average of 69.32%. Male literacy is around 86.29% while female literacy rate is 67.90%. About 16% of the population is under 6 years of age.

== Pin Codes of Jirapur Tehsil ==
- 465691 Jirapur
- 465693 Machalpur
- 465689 Chhapiheda
- 465695 Pipliya Kulmi

== See also ==
- Chhapiheda
