= National Highway 752C (India) =

National highway in India

National Highway 752C
- Map of the National Highway in red

Route information
- Length: 139 km (86 mi)

Major junctions
- North end: Zirapur
- South end: Ashta

Location
- Country: India
- States: Madhya Pradesh

Highway system
- Roads in India; Expressways; National; State; Asian
← NH 752B	→ NH 86

National Highway 752C, commonly referred to as NH 752C is a national highway in India. It is a spur road of National Highway 52. NH-752C traverses the state of Madhya Pradesh in India.

== Route ==
Jirapur - Chhapiheda - Khujner -Pachor - Talen - Shujalpur-Arniya kalan- Ashta.

== Junctions ==
Location	Destinations	Notes
Zirapur	NH 752B	Terminal
near Pachor	NH 52	
1.000 mi = 1.609 km; 1.000 km = 0.621 mi

== See also ==
- List of national highways in India
- List of national highways in India by state
