= Gangahoni =

- Village
- Interactive map of Gangahoni
- Coordinates: 23.866°N 77.134°E
- Country: India
- State: Madhya Pradesh
- District: Rajgarh
- Elevation: 423 m (1,388 ft)

Population (2011)
  - Total: 2,755

Languages
  - Official: Hindi
- Time zone: UTC+5:30 (IST)
- PIN: 465669
- Telephone code: 7374
- Vehicle registration: mp-39-xxxx

Gangahoni is a village in suthaliya tehsil in Rajgarh district in the state of Madhya Pradesh, India.

== Geography ==
Gangahoni is situated along the Suthaliya-Narsinghgarh State Highway, 25 km from Narsinghgarh, 20 km from Suthaliya, 35 km from Biaora, and 100 km from the state capital, Bhopal.

== Demographics ==
Gangahoni is a large village with a total of 639 families residing within it. The village has a population of 2,755 of which 1,418 are males while 1,337 are females as per the 2011 census. The population of children with age 0-6 is 452 which makes up 16.41% of total population of the village. Gangahoni village has a lower literacy rate compared to Madhya Pradesh. In 2011, the literacy rate of Gangahoni village was 54.58% compared to 69.32% of Madhya Pradesh. In Gangahoni, male literacy stands at 71.76% while female literacy rate was 36.78%.

== Languages ==
The primary languages spoken in Gangahoni are Hindi and Malvi.
