= Harana =

Harana may refer to:

- Harana/Valle de Arana a municipality in the autonomous community of Basque Country, northern Spain
- Harana, Rajgarh, a village in Madhya Pradesh, India
- Sierra Harana mountain range in the center of the province of Granada, southern Spain
- Harana Halli (Kannada:ಹಾರನಹಳ್ಳಿ) village in the southern state of Karnataka, India
- the Philippine spelling of the Spanish jarana
- Harana (band), Philippines band founded in 2015
- Harana (serenade), traditional serenade in the Philippines
- Harana (elopement), a Sanskrit term for seizure or elopement
- Harana (flatworm), a genus of land planarians in the subfamily Geoplaninae
