= Harana, Rajgarh =

Harana
- Village
- Location in Madhya Pradesh, India Harana (India)
- Coordinates: 23.767901°N 76.528384°E
- Country: India
- State: Madhya Pradesh
- District: Rajgarh
- Tehsil/Block: Sarangpur
- Pincode: 465687

Government
  - Type: Gram Panchayat
  - Sarpanch Harana: Bhawna Shiv Narayan Bandela
- Elevation: 9.20 m (30.2 ft)

Population (2011)
  - Total: 2,471

Language UK
  - Official: Hindi
- Time zone: UTC+5:30 (IST)
- PIN: 465687
- Telephone code: 07371
- Vehicle registration: MP 39
- Sex ratio: 1000/964 ♂/♀

Harana is a village in Rajgarh district in the state of Madhya Pradesh in India. It belongs to Bhopal Division.

== Geographical ==
It is located 41 km to the south of District headquarters Rajgarh. 25 km from Sarangpur. 124 km from State capital Bhopal. Nearby villages to Harana include Panda (3 km), Bhatkhedi (7 km), Dhamanda (8 km), Bhumka (9 km), Simrol (10 km). Harana is surrounded by Nalkheda Tehsil to the west, Moman Badodia Tehsil to the south, Khilchipur Tehsil to the north, and Zirapur Tehsil to the east. Nearby cities include Sarangpur, Pachore, Shujalpur, and Shajapur.

This place is in the border of the Rajgarh District and Shajapur District. Shajapur District Moman Badodia is south of this place.

== Demographics ==
As of 2011 India census, Harana had a population of 2,471. Males constitute 51% of the population and females 49%. Harana has an average literacy rate of 57.79%, lower than the state average of 69.32%: male literacy is 75.66%, and female literacy is 39.52%. In Harana, 12.18% of the population is under 6 years of age.

Religions in Harana
Religion	Percent
Hindus	100%
Muslims	0%
Distribution of religions

== Religious/Devotional places around Harana ==
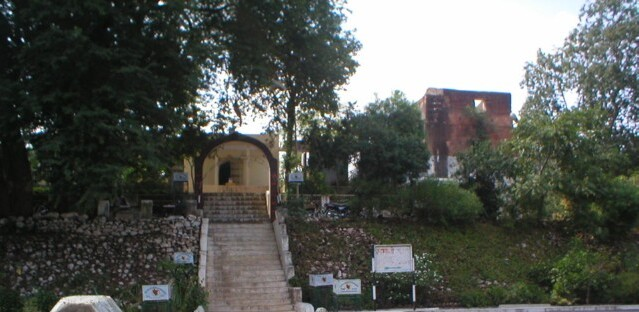
Khoiry Mahadev Temple, Rajgarh

- Bijashan mata Temple Bhaiswa
- Hanuman Mandir Leema chouhan
- Hanuman Mandir Bhatkhedi
- Narsinghgarh Town
- Shyamji Sanka Temple
- Jalpamata Temple
- Dargah Shareif
- Chidikho
- Biora Mandu
- Kotra
- Khoiry Mahadev Temple
- Habban Valley
- Shringul Temple

== Nearby villages ==
- Darana
- Devipura
- Panda
- Baoli
- Sumriahedi
- Arania
- Kalali
- Patadiya Dabi
- Amlawata
- Pipalya Pal
- Babadlya

== Schools in Harana ==
- Government Primary School Harana
- Government Middle School Harana
- Government High School Harana
- Saraswati Shishu Mandir Harana
- Udit Development School Harana
