= Narsinghgarh, Madhya Pradesh =

Narsinghgarh Nursinggurh
- Town
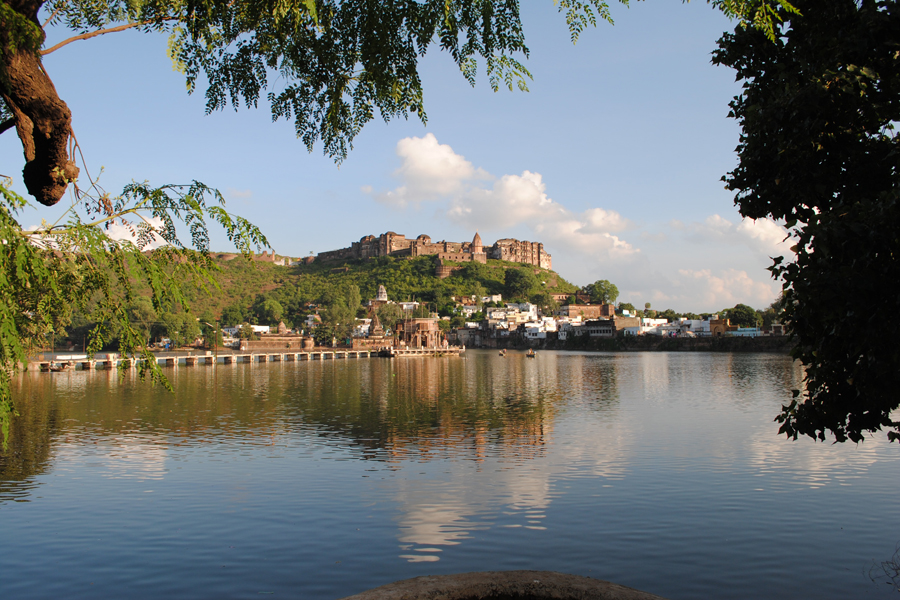
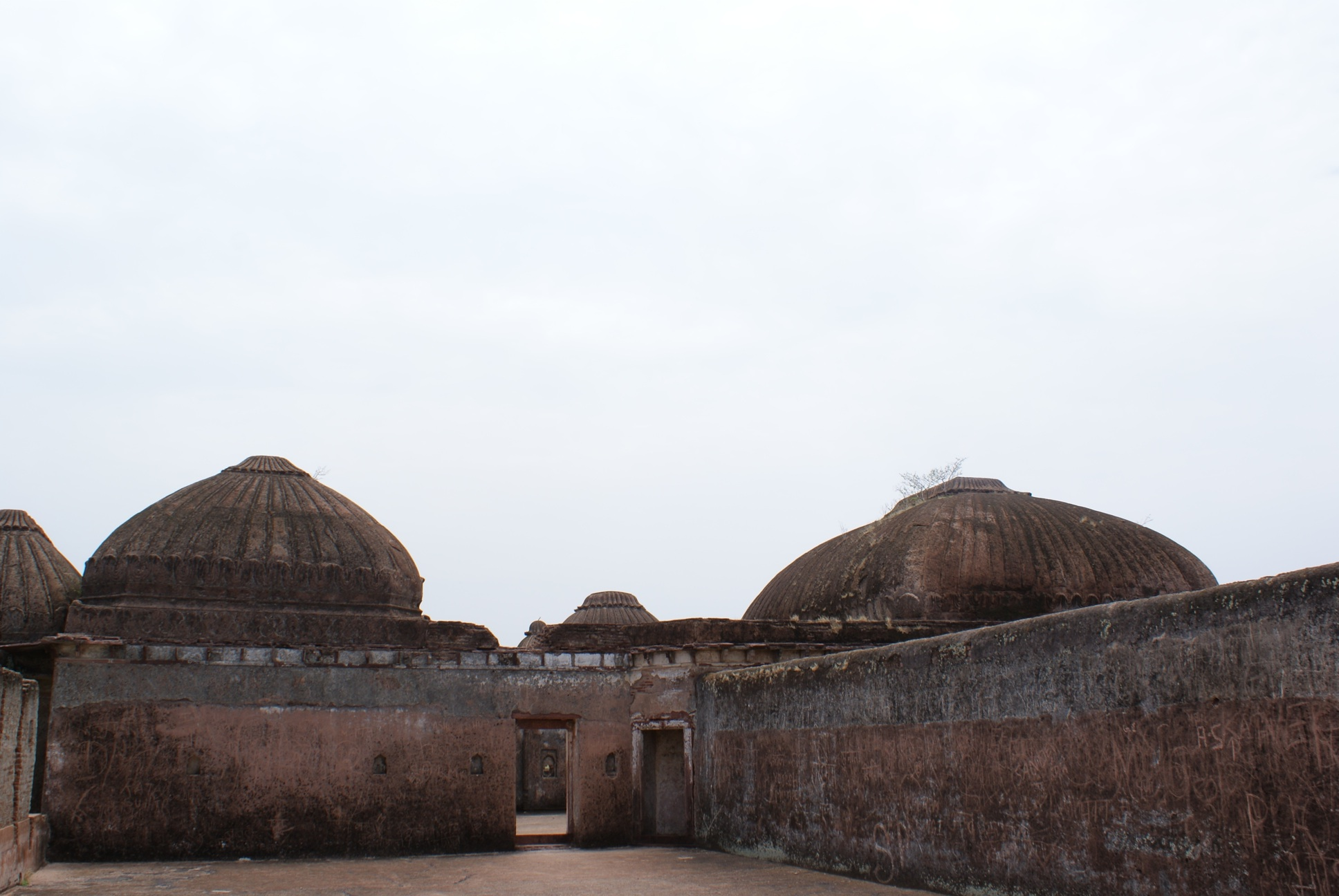
- Narsinghgarh fort in Rajgarh District, Madhya Pradesh, India

- Location within Madhya Pradesh Location within India
- Coordinates: 23.7°N 77.1°E
- Country: India
- State: Madhya Pradesh
- Region: Malwa
- District: Rajgarh

Government
  - Body: Narsinghgarh Municipality

Area
  - Total: 1,368 km^{2} (528 sq mi)
- Elevation: 483 m (1,585 ft)

Population (2011)
  - Total: 32,329

Languages
  - Official: Hindi, Malvi
- Time zone: UTC+5:30 (IST)
- PIN: 465669
- Telephone code: 07375
- Vehicle registration: MP-39
- Website: narsinghgarh.com

Narsinghgarh is a town and a municipality, near Rajgarh city in Rajgarh district in the Indian state of Madhya Pradesh.

== History ==
The town is over 300 years old, having been founded in 1681 by Dewan Parasram. After partition Rawat Paras Ramji named his state after Bhagwan Shri Narsingh (incarnation of the god Vishnu), who was his deity and aradhya Dev. Thereafter, he founded the town of Narsinghgarh and transferred his capital there and constructed the temple of his aradhya Dev Shri Narsingh Bhagwan. He built a tank known as Paras Ram Sagar. The town's lake still bears the name of the founder. The royal family was well connected directly and indirectly in relationship with all the important Rajput royal families of India. The State of Narsinghgarh was carved out of the State of Rajgarh by Paras Ramji, the younger brother of the then Ruler of Rajgarh, Rawat Mohan Singhji in 1681 A.D

- Rawat Paras Ramji (1681–95)
- Rawat Dalel Singhji (1695)
- Rawat Moti Singhji (1695–1751)
- Rawat Khuman Singhji (1751–66)
- Rawat Achal Singhji (1766–95)
- Rawat Sobhagh Singhji (1795–1827)
- Raja Hanwant Singhji (1827–73)
- Raja Pratap Singhji (1873–90)
- Raja Mehtab Singhji (1890–95)
- Raja Arjun Singhji (1895–1924)
- Maharaja Vikram Singhji (1924–57)
- Maharaja Bhanu Prakash Singhji (1957–2019)

== Fort ==
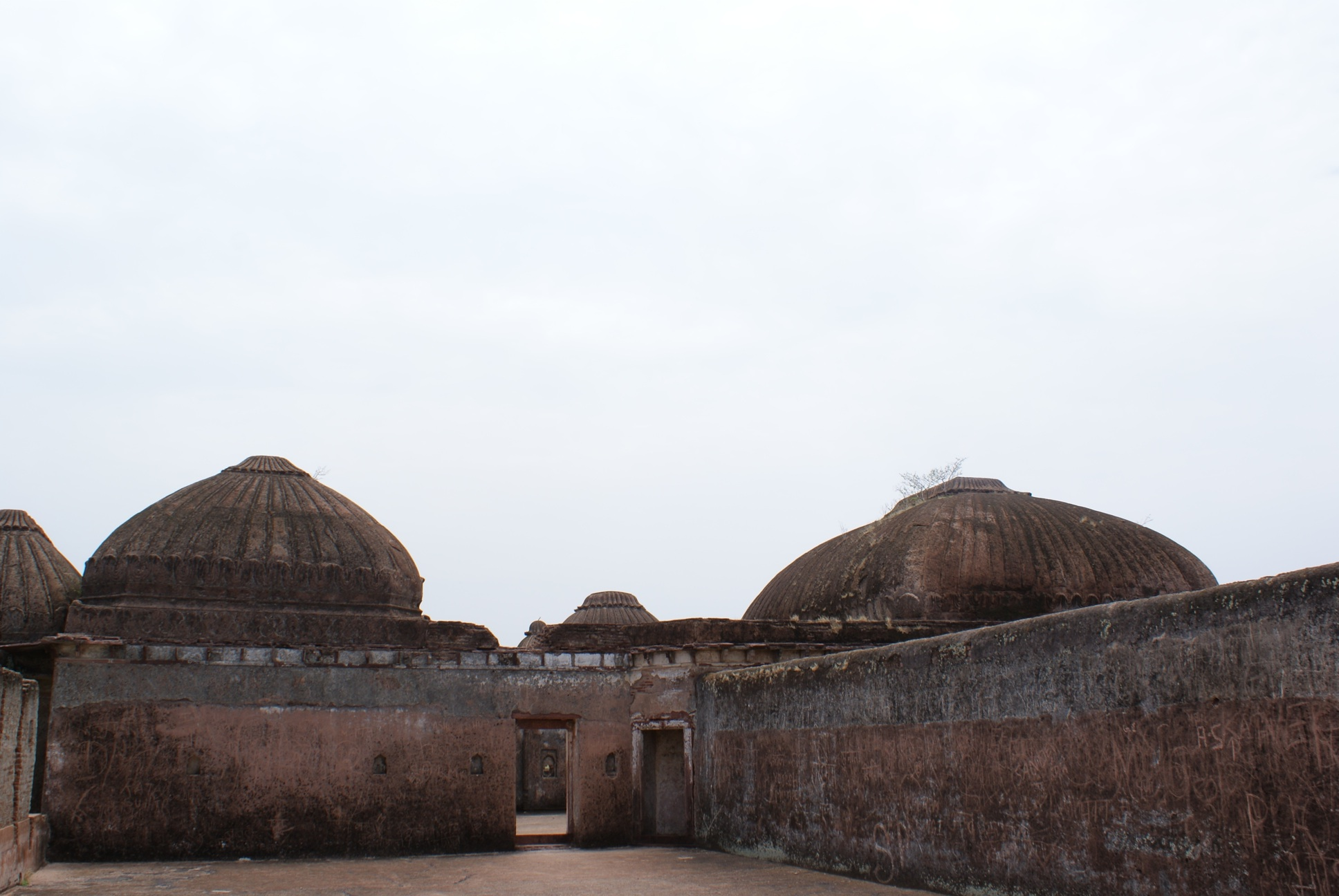
Narsinghgarh Fort

The fort and palace at Narsinghgarh was the official residence of the rulers of Narsinghgarh State till Maharaja Bhanu Prakash Singhji shifted to the Bhanu Niwas Palace in the town in 1962. In Madhya Pradesh and Rajasthan the rulers of Narsinghgarh were the only rulers who lived in the fort. The fort was built nearly 300 years ago in the Rajpur, Mughal and Malwa style. The entire complex covers an area of 45.323 acres and a built in area of more than 177000 sq. feet. It has 304 rooms, 4 halls, 12 chowks and 64 varandas. It is situated nearly 350 feet above the town on the hood of a snake-like hill and the approach to the Fort by vehicles is through its tail. This fort is the third biggest in the former State of Madhya Bharat, now part of Madhya Pradesh State, after the Forts of Mandu & Gwalior. The fort's pool was made in 19th century.

== Geography ==
Narsinghgarh is located on Malwa Plateau at 23.7°N 77.1°E. It has an average elevation of 483 metres (1584 feet). The town is 72 km from the Raja Bhoj Airport and is reached by a good road. Town is surrounded by Vindhyanchal Mountain Range and has three lakes. It is situated between Kota & Bhopal on the Jaipur-Jabalpur National Highway No.12 and is 82 km. from Bhopal, 265 Kilometers from Kota and 200 Kilometers from Indore. The main railway stations are Bhopal Junction on the main Delhi-Chennai line and Biaora nearly 33 km on the Maksi-Gwalior branch line. The town of Vidisha is 84 km. east of Narsinghgarh. The town of Sundersi is 81 kilometers south west of Narsinghgarh. There is a new railway line proposed from Bhopal to Kota via Bairagarh, Shyampur, Narsinghgarh, Biaora, Rajgarh, Khilchipur, Jhalawar, Ramganj Mandi etc. Close to Narsinghgarh is a state wildlife sanctuary with a big lake and a good rest house. Area of Narsinghgarh – 1368 km^{2} >and total 306 villages.

== Demographics ==
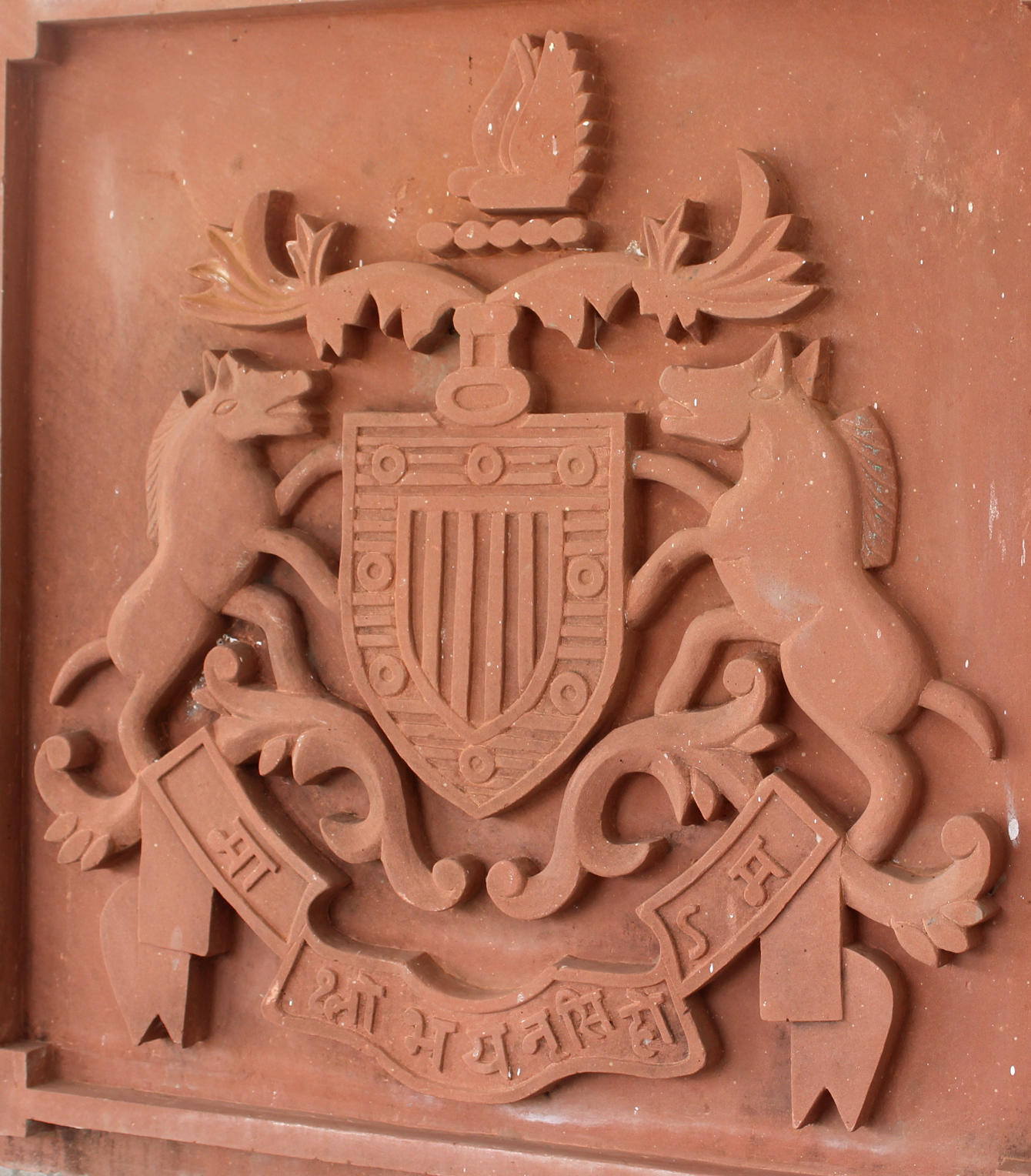
Narsinghgarh state emblem

As of 2001 India census, Narsinghgarh had a population of 27,657. Males constitute 52% of the population and females 48%. Narsinghgarh has an average literacy rate of 66%, higher than the national average of 59.5%: male literacy is 73%, and female literacy is 57%. In Narsinghgarh, 15% of the population is under 6 years of age.

== Art and music ==
The Rulers of Narsinghgarh were patrons of arts and music. The Malwa School of Arts as known today had its origin in the Narsinghgarh School of Arts in the 18th and 19th centuries. One of its artists was Madhav Das, whose collections of paintings were known as "Rag Ragini". The temples of Kunwarani ji and Chapawatji built by the Ranis of Narsinghgarh on the banks of Paras Ram Sagar depicted the paintings of Krishna Leela. From Narsinghgarh it was carried to Mandu and thus later on called the Malwa School of Arts.

The college of Narsinghgarh is affiliated with Khairagarh University.

== Tourist attractions ==
Narsinghgarh's main tourist attractions are Bada Mahadev Mandir, Chota Mahadev Mandir, Gupteshwar Mahadev Mandir, Nadiya Pani, Kodu Pani, raghunathji mandir, Narsinghgarh Fort, Badi Hanuman Gadi, shri jagannath mandir, Choti Hanuman Gadi, Jamaat Mandir and the jal Mandir.There is also Swarn Jain temple, dedicated to Mallinath Swamy along with Jain Dadawadi, it is made up of marble with detailed mirror and gold work, a visual treat for the visitors. There is also one wildlife sanctuary near Narsinghgarh, which is called "Paradise of Peacock"(chiddi kho). Also within short distance there is Shyam Ji shakha mandir, famous for its history and beauty. Narsinghgarh mahotsav is celebrated in winter every year. Nearby Narsinghgarh is Kotra village having wonderful Shamji temple along with Karotia – A narrow cave like structure on the Satpura ranges.

== See also ==
- Narsinghgarh Wildlife Sanctuary
