= Rajgarh State =

Former Hindu Kingdom

Coordinates: 24°02′N 76°53′E

Rajgarh State राजगढ़ राज्य
- Late 15th century–1948
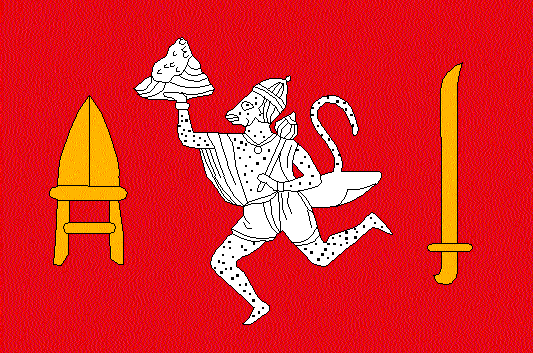
- Flag
- Motto: Rao adwitīya Rājgarh Darbār ("the chief of Rajgarh has no equal")
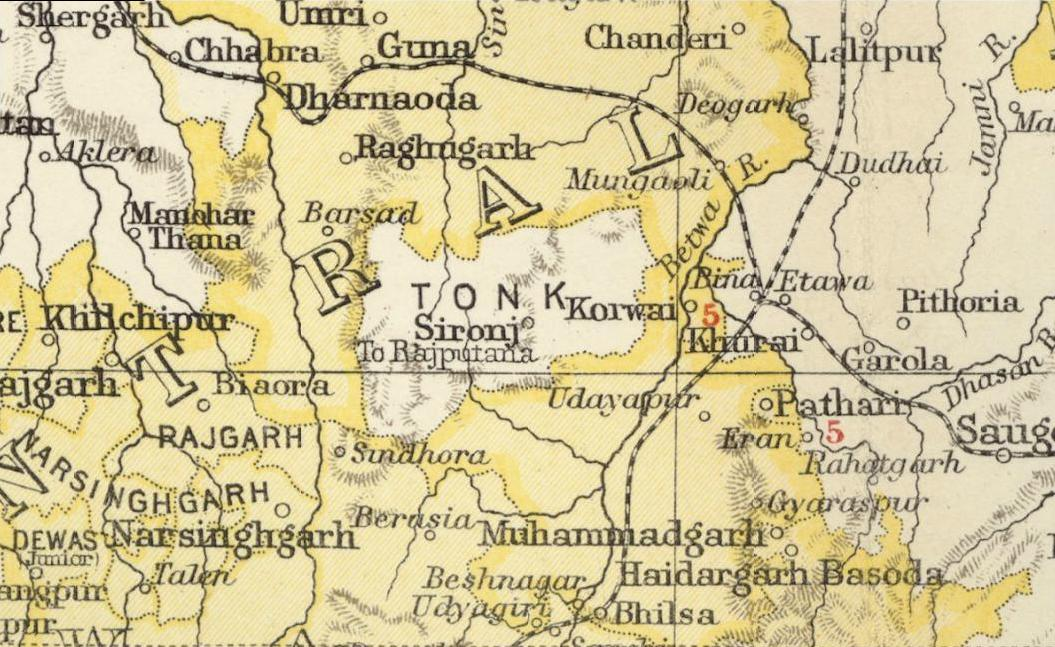
- Rajgarh State in the Imperial Gazetteer of India
- Capital: Rajgarh
- Religion: Hinduism
- History
  - Established: Late 15th century
  - Partition with Narsinghgarh State: 1681
  - Accession to the Union of India: 1948

Area
- 1901: 2,492 km^{2} (962 sq mi)

Population
  - 1901: 88,376
Succeeded by
India

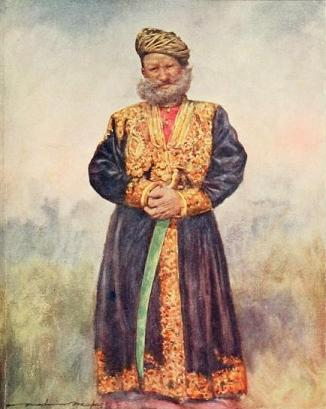
A umat ruler of Rajgarh

The Kingdom of Rajgarh also known as Rajgarh State was a princely state in present-day India, named after its capital Rajgarh, Madhya Pradesh. It was part of the colonial Bhopal Agency of the Central India Agency during the British Raj. It lay in the region of Malwa known as Umathwara after the ruling Umath clan of Rajputs, a branch of the Paramara dynasty. The neighbouring Narsinghgarh State was ruled by a cadet branch of this family, after being partitioned in 1681. The Rajgarh State had an area of 2,492 km² and a population of 88,376 in 1901.

The state revenue reached Rs.450,000 in 1901, the privy purse was Rs.140,000 rupees. The Grain and opium were the principal articles of trade.

== History ==
The Umats of Rajgarh claim descent from the medieval Paramara dynasty that ruled over Malwa for some 600 years. The Umats were driven out of Sindh by the Samma dynasty during the 14th century; Samma sources assign this event to either 1334 or 1351 CE, while the Umats assign it to 1347. Upon being expelled from Sindh, the Umats migrated to Malwa under the leadership of one Sarangsen, who then acquired land in the area between the Sindh and Parbati rivers. This area would come to be known as Umatwara after the Umats.

Sarangsen is said to have later received the title of Rawat by the Rana of Chittor. His descendants were held in high regard by the Delhi Sultans; Rawat Karam Singh, 4th in descent from Sarangsen, is said to have been made governor of Ujjain under Sikandar Lodi. Karam Singh received a sanad for 22 districts in Umatwara, and he made his capital at Duparia, near Shajapur.

A later descendant, Rawat Krishnaji or Kishen Singh, was also governor of Ujjain, and the Kishenpura quarter of Ujjain was supposedly named after him. He died in 1583 and was succeeded by his son Dungar Singh, who founded the town of Dungarpur near Rajgarh and made it his capital. Dungar Singh had six sons, with the two oldest being Udaji and Dudaji. After Dungar Singh was killed at Talen in 1603, Udaji inherited the estate and was recognised as the rightful heir in a sanad granted by Akbar. He moved the capital to Ratanpur and ruled until 1621.

Udaji's successor, Chhatar Singh, died in battle in 1638 and was succeeded by his son Mohan Singh. As Mohan Singh was still a minor at the time, the diwan Ajab Singh, a descendant of Dudaji who had served as a minister of Chhatar Singh, was made regent of the Umatwara estate. The capital was moved back to Dungarpur for the duration of Ajab Singh's regency, and the town of Rajgarh was founded in 1640. After Ajab Singh died in battle at Nalkhera in 1668, his son Paras Ram succeeded as manager of the estate. At this point, Mohan Singh moved his capital to Rajgarh, while Paras Ram moved his capital to Patan, just south of Rajgarh, where he built a fort.

The division of Umatwara into Rajgarh and Narsinghgarh States took place in 1681. An initial division of villages had been made in 1675, leading to a sort of dual jurisdiction between Mohan Singh and Paras Ram that proved to be unmanageable. Thus, a formal division of the Umatwara territory into two states was made in 1681, with the ruler of Rajgarh (Mohan Singh) receiving five extra villages in recognition of his seniority. The daughter Mrinalini fled to the Himalayas and named her new seat (in present Himachal Pradesh) Rajgarh as well.

In 1800, Jujhar Singh signed a subsidiary treaty of alliance with the East India Company, after Sambalpur, to which Rajgarh was a feudatory state, was annexed by the Marathas.

In 1855, Rajgarh State contributed Rs. 25,000 towards the construction of the parts of the Agra-Bombay road that were within its borders.

After India's independence in 1947, the last ruling Raja acceded to the Indian government on 15 June 1948. Rajgarh became part of Madhya Bharat state, which was formed out of the western half of the Raj's Central India Agency of princely states. In 1956 Madhya Bharat was merged into Madhya Pradesh state.

== Geography ==
The southern and eastern parts of Rajgarh State lay on the Malwa plateau, while the northern part was very hilly. The northern hills were Vindhyan sandstone, while the rest of the state was part of the Deccan Traps. This area has a mostly temperate climate, with more variation in temperature in the hills. The main rivers traversing the former state's territory are the Parbati, on the eastern border, and its tributary the Newaj.

Around the turn of the 20th century, 214,900 acres of Rajgarh State were covered by forests, about half of which were in the pargana of Biaora. These forests consisted of decidious trees interspersed with patches of bamboo. Common trees included the karrai (Sterculia urens), Bombax malabaricum, Butea frondosa, Buchanania latifolia, dhaora (Anogeissus latifolia), and Diospyros chloroxylon (called in some earlier sources D. tomentosa).

Animal species native to the area of Rajgarh State include various types of deer, leopard, and wild boar.

== Economy ==
The main exports of Rajgarh State around the turn of the 20th century were grain, crude opium (chik), ghee, poppy seeds, and tilli, while the major imports included piece goods, silk, salt, sugar, kerosene oil, rice and other grains, and hardware. No opium was produced in the state; all crude opium grown locally was collected by the state darbar and then exported. The main manufactured goods produced were khadi cloth, blankets, and ghee; there was also a cotton mill at Biaora which employed 26 people and produced 5,000 maunds of cotton cloth annually.

Rajgarh State had no mines, although two sandstone quarries existed, one at Silapati and the other at Kotda. A majority of the population was engaged in agriculture, with the 1901 census recording 60% of the population engaged in agricultural work.

The main centres of trade were Rajgarh and Biaora, and to a lesser extent the other pargana headquarters. Rajgarh and Biaora also hosted large cattle fairs. The major merchant groups were the Banias (Hindu and Jain), dealing in food, opium, and piece goods; and the Bohoras (Muslim), dealing mainly in hardware. The main trade routes were by road to Guna, Sehore, and Indore, where goods were then transported by rail.

Rajgarh State never minted its own currency. Instead, coins produced by Bhopal State and other princely states were in use until 1897, when the British rupee was declared the sole legal tender.

== Administration ==
The monarch of Rajgarh State held absolute authority in matters of governance. He generally delegated executive authority to a diwan, who was responsible for the day-to-day administration of the state's various departments (Darbar, Revenue, Judicial, Public Works, Police, Educational, and Medical).

Rajgarh State was divided into seven parganas: Newalganj, Biaora, Kalipith, Karanwas, Kotra, Sheogarh, and Talen. Each pargana was overseen by a tahsildar, who served as the chief revenue officer and also presided over the lowest level of criminal courts in the state.

At the turn of the 20th century, the state maintained a small army of 30 cavalry, 102 infantry, and 7 artillery with 4 guns. The annual military budget was Rs. 20,000.

A police force was established in 1902, consisting of 309 constables under the direction of a Muntazim, who was in turn assisted by an Assistant Muntazim, 5 inspectors, and 13 sub-inspectors. The police force was distributed among 11 thanas.

== Rulers ==
The heads of the state held the title of “Rawat”, equivalent to that to Raja until 1872. In 1886, the rulers also held the title of Raja, sometimes collectively called as “Maharaj Rawat”. These titles was somewhat similar to “King” but in British context, roughly translates to ruling “Prince”. One of its ruler Rawat Moti Singh, converted to Islam under the influence of his Muslim courtier and adopted the title of Nawab.

=== List of rulers ===
- 1638 – 14 April 1714 Rawat Mohan Singh (d. 1714)
- 1714? – 1740 Rawat Amar Singh
- 1740 – 1747 Rawat Narpat Singh
- 1747 – 1775 Rawat Jagat Singh
- 1775 – 1790 Rawat Hamir Singh
- 1790 – 1803 Rawat Pratap Singh
- 1803 – 1815 Rawat Prithvi Singh
- 1815 – 1831 Rawat Newal Singh (d. 1831)
- 1831 – 1872 Rawat Moti Singh (converted to Islam)
- 1846 – November 1847 Thakur Khok Singh – temporary administrator on behalf of the ruler
- 1872 – October 1880 Nawab Mohammad 'Abd al-Wasih Khan (previously Rawat as Rawat Moti Singh)
- 1880 – 1882 Rawat Bakhtawar Singh (d. 1882)
- 6 July 1882 – 1 January 1886 Rawat Maharashi Balbhadra Singh (b. 1857 – d. 1902)
- 1 January 1886 – January 1902 Maharaj Rawat Sir Balbhadra Singh
- 20 January 1902 – 9 January 1916 Maharaj Rawat Sir Bane Singh (b. 1857 – d. 1916)
- 17 January 1916 – 26 October 1936 Maharaj Rawat Sir Birendra Singh (b. 1878 – d. 1936)
- 18 December 1936 – 15 August 1947 Maharaj Rawat Sir Bikramaditya Singh (Note: Also sometimes spelled as "Vikramaditya Singh".) (b. 1936 – d. before 2018)

== See also ==
- Political integration of India
