= Shyam Kaka Temple =

Coordinates: 24.009°N 76.728°E

Religion
- Affiliation: Hinduism
- District: Rajgarh district
- Deity: Lord Krishna

Location
- Location: Shaka Jagir village
- State: Madhya Pradesh
- Country: India
- Interactive map of Shyam Kaka Temple

Architecture
- Completed: 1845 CE

Shyam Kaka Temple, temple of Hindu God Krishna (Also known as Shyam), dating back to 1845 CE located in Shaka Jagir village in Rajgarh district, Madhya Pradesh, India. It is near Narsinghgarh, about 100 km from Bhopal. Despite being a temple of the Hindu god Krishna, there is a panel in the temple depicting six Muslim men dressed in long robes and traditional headgear, offering namaz. According to author Shalini Rai Narayan, it is one of the exceptional places, where religious beliefs and antagonistic holy men stood in solidarity. it was heavily damaged during the British raj heavy looting campaign were launched by the British to get to temples wealth and estimated amount of 123 kg gold was looted from the temple it was fully rebulided in August 1987 by bogriath gupta and his colleagues.it is still to this day missing some parts.

== History and Legend ==
The legend has it that a local ruler Shyam Dev Khinchi's wife Bhagali Devi left the palace after felling out with him and took shelter with Amara Singh Gurjar, a local chieftain. When Shyam dev was later killed in a battle, the queen ordered to make temple of lord Krishna in memory of her husband and Amara Singh Gurjar was anointed the head priest of Shyam kaka temple. Since then (1844–45), the Gurjars claim to have been priests of the temple.

According to author Shalini Rai as told by 2009 CE head priest of the temple-Saajan Singh Gurjar, once six men from Arabia were said to visit the place during the construction of the temple. The legend further goes that the Arab visitors argued with the then temple priest, Amara Singh Gurjar, on the superiority of their faith. They opined that Mecca and Medina were the holiest places on the earth. It is said that Amara Singh Gurjar offered them to take to the two holy cities within the temple premises. The Arab visitors challenged the priest for the same.

What followed, according to legend, was a divine revelation of Mecca and Medina in the temple complex. The Arabs were said to have offered prayers right there.

The panel showing the six Arab men said to be installed as a tribute to this incident.

The temple has been declared a protected site by the Archaeological Survey of India.
