= National Highway 552G (India) =

National Highway in India

National Highway 552G
- Map of National Highway 552G in red

Route information
- Auxiliary route of NH 52
- Length: 166 km (103 mi)

Major junctions
- North end: Jhalrapatan
- South end: Ujjain

Location
- Country: India
- States: Madhya Pradesh, Rajasthan

Highway system
- Roads in India; Expressways; National; State; Asian
| ← NH 52 | → NH 552G |

National Highway 552G, commonly referred to as NH 552G is a national highway in India. It is a secondary route of National Highway 52. NH-552G runs in the states of Rajasthan and Madhya Pradesh in India.

== Route ==
NH552G connects Jhalrapatan in Rajasthan to Ujjain in the state of Madhya Pradesh.

Rajasthan

Jhalrapatan, Beenda, Dawal - M.P. border

Madhya Pradesh

Rajasthan border - Dongargaon, Agar Malwa - Soyat, Susner, Agar, Ghosla, Ghatia, Ujjain

== Junctions ==
NH 52 Terminal near Jhalrapatan.
NH 752B near Susner.

== See also ==
- List of national highways in India
- List of national highways in India by state
