= Udankhedi =

- village
- Location in Madhya Pradesh, India
- Coordinates: 23°41′44″N 76°38′1″E
- Country: India
- State: Madhya Pradesh
- District: rajgarh

Languages
  - Official: Hindi
- Time zone: UTC+5:30 (IST)
- PIN: 465683
- Vehicle registration: mp-39
- Nearest city: Sarangpur, Pachore
- Lok Sabha constituency: Rajgarh
- Climate: normal (Köppen)

Udankhedi is a village within the Rajgarh District in central Madhya Pradesh, India. Located in Sarangpur Mandal of Rajgarh District in Madhya Pradesh State. Udankhedi is 19.9 kilometres (12.4 mi) far from its Mandal town of Sarangpur. Udankhedi is located 39.3 kilometres (24.4 mi) distance from its district headquarters at Rajgarh. It is located 92 kilometres (57 mi) from its state capital Bhopal.

== Transportation ==
Udyan Kheri railway station is the main railway station of the locality situated on Indore–Gwalior line under the Bhopal railway division of West Central Railway zone.
