= Jhiri, Rajgarh =

Jhiri
- Village
- Location within Madhya Pradesh
- Coordinates: 24.038°N 77.088°E
- Country: India
- State: Madhya Pradesh
- Time zone: UTC+5:30 (IST)

Jhiri is a village in Rajgarh, Madhya Pradesh, India. The village is noted for the usage of Sanskrit by the local population.

== Demographics ==
Per the 2011 Census of India, Jhiri has a total population of 976; of whom 472 are male and 504 female.
