= Udyan Kheri railway station =

Railway station in Madhya Pradesh, India

Udyan Kheri

General information
- Location: National Highway 52, Udankhedi, Rajgarh district, Madhya Pradesh; Pakistan
- Coordinates: 23°40′48″N 76°38′22″E
- Elevation: 435 m (1,427 ft)
- System: Passenger train station
- Owner: Indian Railways
- Operator: West Central Railway
- Line: Indore–Gwalior line
- Platforms: 1
- Tracks: 1

Construction
- Structure type: Standard (on ground station)

Other information
- Status: Active
- Station code: UDK
- Zone(s): West Central Railway zone
- Division(s): Bhopal

History
- Opened: 1899
- Former names: Gwalior Light Railway

Services
Preceding station	Indian Railways	Following station
Pachor Road towards ?	West Central Railway zone Indore–Gwalior line	Parhana Mau towards ?
Location

Udyan Kheri railway station is a railway station on Indore–Gwalior line under the Bhopal railway division of West Central Railway zone. This is situated beside National Highway 52 at Udankhedi in Rajgarh district of the Indian state of Madhya Pradesh.
