= National Highway 752B (India) =

National highway in India

National Highway 752B
- Map of the National Highway in red

Route information
- Length: 151 km (94 mi)

Major junctions
- West end: Susner
- East end: Sironj

Location
- Country: India
- States: Madhya Pradesh

Highway system
- Roads in India; Expressways; National; State; Asian
← NH 52	→ NH 46

National Highway 752B, commonly referred to as NH 752B is a national highway in India. It is a spur road of National Highway 52. NH-752B traverses the state of Madhya Pradesh in India.

== Route ==
Rajasthan/M.P. border - Susner, Khilchipur, Biaora, Maksundangarh, Lateri, Sironj.

== Junctions ==
NH 752C near Zirapur.
NH 52 near Khilchipur.
NH 46 near Biaora.

== See also ==
- List of national highways in India
- List of national highways in India by state
