= Sikhwal Brahmins =

- Religions: Hinduism
- Languages: Hindi, Rajasthani
- Region: Rajasthan, Madhya Pradesh, Uttar Pradesh, Gujarat

Sikhwal Brahmins (also spelled Sukhwal) are a subcaste of Brahmins primarily found in the Indian states of Rajasthan, Madhya Pradesh, Uttar Pradesh, and Gujarat. The community traces its lineage to the sage Rishi Shringi, a revered figure in Hindu mythology known for performing the Putrakameshti Yajna that led to the birth of Lord Rama and his brothers, as narrated in ancient texts.

== History ==
The Sikhwal Brahmins trace their lineage to Rishi Shringi. According to 'Sikhwal Rajasthan Itihas' by N.M. Sharma, the community's roots are embedded in Rajasthan and historically associated with priestly and scholarly roles. The book documents the migration, settlement, and contributions of Sikhwal Brahmins in Rajasthan's religious and social history.

== Distribution ==
The Sikhwal Brahmins are predominantly settled in Rajasthan, with notable populations also in Madhya Pradesh, Uttar Pradesh, and Gujarat. Key regions include:

- Rajasthan: Jaipur, Ajmer, Kota, Udaipur
- Madhya Pradesh: Bhopal, Jabalpur, Sagar, Bina, Khurai, Damoh
- Uttar Pradesh: Jhansi, Lalitpur, Kanpur, Baruasagar
- Gujarat: various regions with smaller populations

In recent decades, members of the Sikhwal community spread across India and abroad, including the United States and Europe.

== Cultural practices ==
Sikhwal Brahmins follow traditional Brahminical customs, including Vedic rituals, festivals, and scriptural recitations. Education and the preservation of religious texts are highly valued. Marriages are usually endogamous, typically arranged within the subcaste, and follow traditional Hindu rites.

== Notables ==
- Dr. Vikrant Pandey – 2005-batch IAS officer of the Gujarat cadre, MBBS graduate, and Secretary to the Chief Minister of Gujarat.
- Vikas Upadhyay (b. 1975), Indian National Congress politician; served as Member of the Chhattisgarh Legislative Assembly representing Raipur City West from 2018 to 2023.

== Activities ==
In January 2024, members of the Sikhwal Brahman Samaj from Begum Bazar, Hyderabad, participated in the Ram Mandir Pran Pratistha (consecration) ceremonies in Ayodhya. Over 70 members traveled to Ayodhya to serve tea and coffee to devotees from January 14 to January 31. Concurrently, the community organized a Chappan Bhog offering and a Shobha Yatra (religious procession) in Hyderabad.

In July 2024, the Sikhwal community in Neemuch observed Shringi Rishi Jayanti on Guru Purnima, organizing a rally and cultural events.
