= Priyavrat Singh =

Indian politician

Minister of Energy Department Government of Madhya Pradesh
- In office 25 December 2018 – 23 March 2020
- Chief Minister: Kamal Nath
- Preceded by: Paras Chandra Jain, BJP
- Succeeded by: Pradhuman Singh Tomar, BJP

Member of the Madhya Pradesh Legislative Assembly
- In office 8 December 2018 – 3 December 2023
- Preceded by: Hajarilal Dangi, BJP
- Succeeded by: Hajarilal Dangi, BJP
- Constituency: Khilchipur
- In office December 2008 – November 2013
- Preceded by: Priyavrat Singh
- Succeeded by: Hajarilal Dangi, BJP
- Constituency: Khilchipur
- In office December 2003 – November 2008
- Preceded by: Hajarilal Dangi, INC
- Succeeded by: Priyavrat Singh
- Constituency: Khilchipur

Personal details
- Born: 5 December 1977 (age 48) Indore, Madhya Pradesh, India
- Citizenship: India
- Party: Indian National Congress

Priyavrat Singh (born 5 December 1977) is an Indian politician who is a member of the Indian National Congress, and the Formar Member of the Legislative Assembly (MLA) of Madhya Pradhesh, He was the Ex. MLA from Khilchipur Assembly constituency, He is very Popular in his constituency. Hailing from the erstwhile royal family of Khilchipur State, he is also known as Raja Rao Bahadur Priyavrat Singh. He also served as the state President of the Madhya Pradesh Youth Congress.

Priyavrat Singh has spent his political career in the Congress, starting out as a zilla panchayat member from Rajgarh district in 1998 at the age of 21. His first Assembly election was from Khilchipur in 2003, which he won with a huge margin. He became a popular face due to his work and development initiatives, and was re-elected in 2008. He lost the Assembly polls in 2013 to the BJP’s Hajarilal Dangi.

He was elected as member of madhya pradesh legislative assembly first time in 2003 and was re-elected in 2008. He lost the assembly poll in 2013 election, In 2018, he won back Khilchipur by over 29,000 votes, and was made Energy Minister by Kamal Nath., He represented the constituency of Khilchipur Vidhan Sabha. In 2023 assembly election he lost to BJP's Hajarilal Dangi by 13678 margin.

== Early life and education ==
He passed Secondary examination (10th) in the year 1993 from The Daly college Indore. And passed Senior School Examination (12th) from IPS Indore in the year 1995. He graduated (BA) from Devi Ahilya Bai University, Indore in 1998.

== Electoral history ==
Third time MLA from khilchipur Assembly constituency.

	Constituency	Tenure	
Member of Madhya Pradesh Legislative Assembly	Khilchipur	2018	2023
Member of Madhya Pradesh Legislative Assembly	Khilchipur	2008	2013
Member of Madhya Pradesh Legislative Assembly	Khilchipur	2003	2008
Member of Jila Panchayat, Rajgarh	Rajgarh	1998	2003

== Political career ==
He was elected for the record third time as an MLA from Khilchipur Assembly constituency in 2018, and was made cabinet minister of energy in the Kamal Nath ministry of the Madhya Pradesh Congress government, between December 2018 and March 2020.

He became Jila Panchayat Sadasya (in very young age of 21 years) from Rajgarh district from 1998 to 2003,

Based on his popularity in Khilchipur Assembly constituency, he was given ticket for MLA in 2003 from Congress Party, he won it with huge margin and became MLA (first time) from Khilchipur constituency. He became very popular face in the Khilchipur Assembly constituency due to his work in his constituency.

He was reelected in 2008 (2nd time) from Khilchipur constituency as MLA.

In 2013 he was again given ticket from Khilchipur Assembly constituency but he lost this election to Hajari Lal Dangi of BJP, but he kept serving his constituency people.

In 2018 he again fight assembly election on Congress ticket and won it with huge margin and became MLA (third time) from Khilchipur Assembly constituency, and became energy minister of cabinet rank in Kamalnath government.

He had been served as the state president of the Madhya Pradesh Youth Congress.

== Portfolio Held ==
Minister of Energy Department in Madhya Pradesh government, Cabinet minister (Urja Mantri) in Kamalnath Government From December 2018 to March 2020.

Priyavrat Singh

Minister of Energy Department Government of Madhya Pradesh
- In office 25 December 2018 – 23 March 2020
- Chief Minister: Kamal Nath
- Preceded by: Paras Chandra Jain, BJP
- Succeeded by: Pradhuman Singh Tomar, BJP

== In Media ==
Priyavrat Singh had a public exchange with Hajarilal Dangi in August 2023 when he accused the latter of inclining towards any party that is in power.

Priyavrat Singh won back in 2018 legislative assembly election with over 29000 voters.
