= National Highway 46 (India) =

National highway in Madhya Pradesh, India

National Highway 46
- Map of the National Highway in red

Route information
- Part of AH47
- Length: 634 km (394 mi)

Major junctions
- North end: Gwalior
- South end: Betul

Location
- Country: India
- States: Madhya Pradesh

Highway system
- Roads in India; Expressways; National; State; Asian
← NH 44	→ NH 47

National Highway 46 (NH 46) is a primary National Highway in India. This highway is in the state of Madhya Pradesh, running from Gwalior to Betul. This national highway is 634 km (394 mi) long. Before renumbering of national highways, NH-46 was variously numbered as old national highways 3, 12 & 69. Gwalior-Biaora section of this highway is a part of the Legendary Agra-Bombay Road, also known as AB Road

== Route ==
Schematic map of National Highways in India

NH46 connects Gwalior, Shivpuri, Guna, Chachaura-Binaganj, Biaora, Bhopal, Obedullaganj, Hoshangabad and terminates at Betul in the state of Madhya Pradesh.

== Junctions ==
NH 44 Terminal near Gwalior.
NH 27 near Shivpuri
NH 752B near guna
NH 52 near Guna
NH 346 near Jharkheda
NH 86 near Bhopal
NH 146 near Bhopal
NH 45 near Obedullaganj
NH 146B near Budhni
NH 246 near Baretha
NH 47 Terminal near Betul

== Asian Highways ==
Gwalior to Biora stretch of National Highway 46 is part of Asian Highway 47. From Biora AH47 continues along NH52.

== Further expansion ==
By 2025, NH46 is planned to extend up till Etawah in Uttar Pradesh. For this project NH719 running from Gwalior to Etawah via Bhind will be made into a 4 Lane Highway & merged with NH46. Post completion of this work NH46 will become 750 kilometres (470 mi) long. Also Baretha Chhindwara Seoni Nainpur Road is upgraded as National Highway 246(NH246) which connects NH46 at Baretha with Ghoradongri, NTPC Sarni, Damua Coal Washery, Eklehra, Parasia, Chhindwara, Seoni, Bhoma, Kanhiwada, Keolari & finally ending on NH543 at Nainpur. Total distance covered by NH246 is 302.7 Kilometers(188 miles) & it runs fully through Madhya Pradesh.

== See also ==
- List of national highways in India
- List of national highways in India by state
