= Narsinghgarh Wildlife Sanctuary =

Wildlife sanctuary in Madhya Pradesh, India

- IUCN category IV (habitat/species management area)
- Location within Madhya Pradesh Location within India
- Interactive map of Narsinghgarh Wildlife Sanctuary
- Location: Rajgarh district in Madhya Pradesh, India
- Nearest city: Narsinghgarh
- Coordinates: 23.625°N 77.0667°E
- Area: 57.197 km^{2} (22.084 sq mi)
- Established: 1978
- Governing body: Forest Department, Madhya Pradesh

Narsinghgarh Wildlife Sanctuary also known as Chidi Kho Wildlife Sanctuary is a protected area in the Rajgarh district of Madhya Pradesh, India. Established in 1978, it covers 57.197 km^{2} (22.084 sq mi) of dry deciduous forest on the northern edge of the Malwa Plateau.

== Flora ==
The sanctuary is characterized by dry deciduous trees such as teak (Tectona grandis), dhawda (Anogeissus latifolia), saja (Terminalia tomentosa), khair (Acacia catechu) and understorey species including bamboo and tendu.

== Fauna ==
Large herbivores include chital (Axis axis), sambar (Rusa unicolor) and nilgai (Boselaphus tragocamelus), which roam freely around Chidikho Lake in the sanctuary’s centre. Leopards (Panthera pardus) have also been recorded in the area, often venturing close to Narsinghgarh town.

== Avifauna ==
The sanctuary supports over 175 species of resident and migratory birds, including the state bird of Madhya Pradesh,the Indian paradise flycatcher (Terpsiphone paradisi), and large numbers of peafowl (Pavo cristatus).

== Tourism and access ==
Chidikho Lake is the main bird-watching spot. Visitors can explore natural caves bearing ancient red and white wall paintings. The best season to visit is November–June. The nearest airport is Raja Bhoj Airport, Bhopal (≈85 km), and the nearest railhead is Biaora (≈35 km), with road access via NH-46.

== Conservation and research ==
A 2019 government study assessed the impact of tourism and unregulated development on Madhya Pradesh’s protected areas, recommending carrying-capacity limits and habitat-friendly infrastructure in sanctuaries like Narsinghgarh.
