= National Highway 146B (India) =

National highway in India

National Highway 146B
- Map of the National Highway in red

Route information
- Length: 50 km (31 mi)

Major junctions
- West end: Budhni
- East end: Nasrullaganj

Location
- Country: India
- States: Madhya Pradesh

Highway system
- Roads in India; Expressways; National; State; Asian
← NH 46	→ NH 46

National Highway 146B, commonly referred to as NH 146B is a national highway in India. It is a spur road of National Highway 46. NH-146B traverses the state of Madhya Pradesh in India.

== Route ==
Budhni, Kosmi, Rehti, Nasrullaganj.

== Junctions ==
NH 46 Terminal near Budhni.

== See also ==
- List of national highways in India
- List of national highways in India by state
