= National Highway 719 (India) =

National highway in India

National Highway 719
- Map of National Highway 719 in red

Route information
- Auxiliary route of NH 19
- Length: 124 km (77 mi)

Major junctions
- From: Etawah
- To: Gwalior

Location
- Country: India
- States: Uttar Pradesh, Madhya Pradesh
- Primary destinations: Bhind

Highway system
- Roads in India; Expressways; National; State; Asian
← NH 19	→ NH 44

National Highway 719 (NH 719) is a National Highway in India. It connects Etawah in Uttar Pradesh and Gwalior in Madhya Pradesh it was formerly known as National Highway 92. NH719 is being widened to 4 Lane Highway & set to be merged with NH46 by 2025. This will provide seamless movement from Kanpur to Gwalior, Guna, Bhopal & Indore.

== Route ==
- NH19 near Etawah
- Bhind
- NH44 near Gwalior in Madhya Pradesh
