= National Highway 346 (India) =

National highway in India

National Highway 346
- Map of the National Highway in red

Route information
- Length: 222 km (138 mi)

Major junctions
- South end: Jharkheda
- North end: Chanderi

Location
- Country: India
- States: Madhya Pradesh

Highway system
- Roads in India; Expressways; National; State; Asian
← NH 46	→ NH 47

National Highway 346, commonly referred to as NH 346 is a national highway in India. It is a spur road of National Highway 46. NH-346 traverses the state of Madhya Pradesh in India.

== Route ==
Jharkheda, Berasia, Vidisha, Kurwai, Mungaoli, Chanderi.

== Junctions ==
NH 46 Terminal near Jharkheda.

== See also ==
- List of national highways in India
- List of national highways in India by state
