= Kurawar, Madhya Pradesh =

Town in Madhya Pradesh, India

Kurawar
- Town
- Location in Madhya Pradesh, India
- Coordinates: 23.51°N 77.02°E
- Country: India
- State: Madhya Pradesh
- District: Rajgarh District

Government
  - Type: Nagar panchayat

Population (2011)
  - Total: 13,971

Languages
  - Official: Hindi
- PIN: 465667
- Vehicle registration: MP 39

Kurawar is a town and Nagar Parishad in Rajgarh District of Madhya Pradesh, India.

== Geography ==
Kurawar is located at 23°51′N 77°02′E. It has an average elevation of 483 metres (1,585 ft). Kurawar is 55 km away from Bhopal.

== Demographics ==
Kurawar town has a population of 13,917, of which 7,262 are males while 6,655 are females, with a total of 2854 families residing in Kurawar.

== Economy ==
The main business in the region is agriculture. Mainly wheat, gram and soybeans are grown in the area because of the good quality of soil.

There are several small and big villages attached with Kurawar and various people come here to buy various daily use products and selling of their grains.

== Civil administration ==
Kurawar town is divided into 15 wards for which elections are held every 5 years.

Kurawar town has total administration over 2,854 houses to which it supplies basic amenities like water and sewerage. It is also authorize to build roads within Nagar Panchayat limits and impose taxes on properties coming under its jurisdiction.

== Transport ==
Kurawar is well connected with roads. It is connected with Rajgarh, Biaora, and Bhopal. Daily buses run from there.

The nearest airport is Bhopal Airport.
