= Pachor Road railway station =

Railway station in Madhya Pradesh, India

Pachor Road

General information
- Location: National Highway 52, Pachore, Rajgarh district, Madhya Pradesh; India
- Coordinates: 23°43′45″N 76°44′30″E
- Elevation: 426 m (1,398 ft)
- System: Passenger train station
- Owner: Indian Railways
- Operator: West Central Railway
- Line: Indore–Gwalior line
- Platforms: 2
- Tracks: 1

Construction
- Structure type: Standard (on ground station)

Other information
- Status: Active
- Station code: PFR
- Zone(s): West Central Railway zone
- Division(s): Bhopal

History
- Opened: 1899
- Former names: Gwalior Light Railway

Services
Preceding station	Indian Railways	Following station
Biyavra Rajgarh towards ?	West Central Railway zone Indore–Gwalior line	Udyan Kheri towards ?
Location

Pachor Road railway station is a railway station on the Indore–Gwalior line under the Bhopal railway division of West Central Railway zone. This is situated beside National Highway 52 at Pachore in the Rajgarh district of the Indian state of Madhya Pradesh.
