= Vikrant Pandey =

Secretary to the Chief Minister of Gujarat

Vikrant Pandey IAS

Secretary to the Chief Minister of Gujarat
- Incumbent
- Assumed office May 2025
- Preceded by: Avantika Singh Aulakh

Personal details
- Born: 22 April 1979 (age 46) Bakani, Jhalawar district, Rajasthan, India
- Education: (MBBS) Dr. Sampurnanand Medical College
- Occupation: Civil servant

Vikrant Pandey (born 22 April 1979) is an Indian Administrative Service officer of the 2005 batch from Gujarat cadre. In May 2025, he was appointed as the Secretary to the Chief Minister of Gujarat, returning to the state's administration after a six-years of central deputation.

== Early life and education ==
Pandey hails from Bakani, a town in the Jhalawar district of Rajasthan. He completed his MBBS from Dr. Sampurnanand Medical College in Jodhpur. After briefly practicing medicine, he transitioned to the civil services, clearing the UPSC Civil Services Examination and joining the IAS in 2005.

== Career ==
Pandey began his administrative career in Gujarat, serving as District Collector in several districts, including Rajkot, Bharuch, Valsad, and Ahmedabad. During his tenure as Bharuch Collector, he was recognized with the Prime Minister's Award for Excellence in Public Administration.

In November 2019, Pandey was deputed to the Ministry of Home Affairs, where he served as Director in the Inter-State Council Secretariat. He held this position until December 2024, after which he was appointed as the Resident Commissioner of Gujarat in New Delhi.

In May 2025, Pandey was appointed as the Secretary to the Chief Minister of Gujarat, returning to the state's administrative framework after six years.
