= Talen, Rajgarh =

Talen Taragarh
- Town
- Location in Madhya Pradesh, India Talen (India)
- Coordinates: 23.57°N 76.72°E
- Country: India
- State: Madhya Pradesh
- District: Rajgarh
- Elevation: 428 m (1,404 ft)

Population (2001)
  - Total: 12,098

Languages
  - Official: Hindi
- Time zone: UTC+5:30 (IST)
- Telephone code: 07371
- ISO 3166 code: IN-MP
- Vehicle registration: MP
- Sex ratio: 9:8 ♂/♀

Talen is a town in Madhya Pradesh, India.

== Geography ==
Talen is located at 23.57°N 76.72°E. It has an average elevation of 428 metres (1,404 feet).

== Demographics ==
As of 2001 India census, Talen had a population of 9,098. Males constitute 52% of the population and females 48%. Talen has an average literacy rate of 56%, lower than the national average of 59.5%: male literacy is 61%, and female literacy is 35%. In Talen, 20% of the population is under 6 years of age.

== Transport ==
The town has bus services only during the day time. Nearest railway station is Shujalpur at 21 km (on Indore-Bhopal track) another one is pachore (17 km). The nearest airport is in Bhopal which is 84 km (by train) and 115 km (by bus)
