= Hajarilal Dangi =

Indian politician

Member of the Madhya Pradesh Legislative Assembly
- In office 1998–2008
- Preceded by: Ramprasad Dangi
- Succeeded by: Priyavrat Singh
- Constituency: Khilchipur
- In office 2013–2018
- Preceded by: Priyavrat Singh
- Succeeded by: Priyavrat Singh
- Constituency: Khilchipur
- Incumbent
- Assumed office 2023
- Preceded by: Priyavrat Singh

Personal details
- Party: Bharatiya Janata Party
- Other political affiliations: Indian National Congress
- Profession: Politician

Hajarilal Dangi is an Indian politician from Madhya Pradesh. He is a three time elected Member of the Madhya Pradesh Legislative Assembly from 1998, 2013, and 2023, representing Khilchipur Assembly constituency as a Member of the Bharatiya Janata Party.

== See also ==
- List of chief ministers of Madhya Pradesh
- Madhya Pradesh Legislative Assembly
