= Khujner =

- Town
- Nickname: Kunj Nagar
- Location in Madhya Pradesh, India Khujner (India)
- Coordinates: 23.78°N 76.6°E
- Country: India
- State: Madhya Pradesh
- District: Rajgarh
- Elevation: 531 m (1,742 ft)

Population (2001)
  - Total: 10,785

Languages
  - Official: Hindi
- Time zone: UTC+5:30 (IST)
- ISO 3166 code: IN-MP
- Vehicle registration: MP

Khujner is a town and a nagar panchayat in Rajgarh district in the Indian state of Madhya Pradesh. Khujner also called Khatu of Malwa. 465687 is Pin Code of Khujner.

== Geography ==
Khujner is located at 23.78°N 76.6°E. It has an average elevation of 531 metres (1,742 feet).

== Demographics ==
Khujner is divided into 15 wards for which elections are held every five years. As per the Population Census 2011, there are total 2,052 families residing in the Khujner. The total population is 10,785 out of which 5,432 are males and 5,353 are females thus the average sex ratio of Khujner is 985.

The population of Children of age 0–6 years in Khujner is 1,603 which is 15% of the total population. There are 837 male children and 766 female children between the age 0–6 years. Thus as per the Census 2011 the child sex ratio of Khujner is 915 which is less than the average sex ratio (985).

As per the Census 2011, the literacy rate of Khujner is 76.3%. Khujner has higher literacy rate compared to 61.2% of Rajgarh district. The male literacy rate is 74% and the female literacy rate is 55.8%.

== Transport ==
- The nearest railway station is Pachor Road railway station (15 km).
- The nearest airport is Indore Airport (160 km).
- Khujner is connected by road to Indore, Kota, Bhopal and Jhalawar by direct buses.
