= Harana Halli =

- village
- Country: India
- State: Karnataka
- District: Shimoga District
- Talukas: Shimoga

Population (2001)
  - Total: 6,000

Languages
  - Official: Kannada
- Time zone: UTC+5:30 (IST)
- PIN: 577416
- Telephone code: (91) 8182
- Nearest city: Shimoga

Harana Halli is a village in the southern state of Karnataka, India. It is located in the Shimoga taluk of Shimoga district in Karnataka. Harana Halli is about 21 km from Shimoga town. The trains operating from Birur to Sagara go via Harana Halli railway station . The famous Shimoga-Talaguppa railway (RailBus) route which provides access to Jog Falls goes via Harana Halli. The Rail bus service is now stopped.

== Demographics ==
As of 2001 India census, Harana Halli had a population of 5655 with 2864 males and 2791 females.

== Education ==
Harana Halli has been the hub of education till pre-university level, and conveniently located for students from the surrounding villages. It has both Kannada and English medium schools and pre-university college.

== Cultivation and crafts ==
Harana Halli is surrounded by many rain dependent ponds and major cultivation including paddy, raagi, corn, ginger etc..

Harana Halli is famous for its handy craft work made of mud that is called gudigaarike and making Pots, Ganesha idols, show case small items including statues and also wood craft is famous in this region.

== See also ==
- Shimoga
- Districts of Karnataka
