= Suthaliya =

- Town
- Location in Madhya Pradesh, India
- Coordinates: 23°59′43″N 77°8′16″E
- Country: India
- State: Madhya Pradesh
- District: Rajgarh

Government
  - Type: Nagar parishad
  - Body: Adhyaksh (current - laxmibai leeladhar Lodhi)

Population (2010)
  - Total: 9,456

Languages
  - Official: Hindi
- Time zone: UTC+5:30 (IST)
- Postal code: 465677
- ISO 3166 code: IN-MP
- Vehicle registration: MP
- Sex ratio: 54 ♂/♀

Suthaliya is a town and a nagar panchayat in Rajgarh district in the Indian state of Madhya Pradesh.

== Demographics ==
As of 2001 India census, Suthaliya had a population of 9,456. Males constitute 53% of the population and females 47%. Suthaliya has an average literacy rate of 50%, lower than the national average of 59.5%: male literacy is 62%, and female literacy is 37%. In Suthaliya, 18% of the population is under 6 years of age.

Yagya Ashram in Near Suthaliya.

Yagya Ashram was Established 7 August 2020.
