= Shyampur, Bhopal =

Shyampur
- village
- Location within Madhya Pradesh Location within India
- Coordinates: 23.339555°N 77.4192758°E
- Country: India
- State: Madhya Pradesh
- District: Bhopal
- Tehsil: Huzur
- Elevation: 483 m (1,585 ft)

Population (2011)
  - Total: 659
- Time zone: UTC+5:30 (IST)
- ISO 3166 code: MP-IN
- 2011 census code: 482455

Shyampur is a village in the Bhopal district of Madhya Pradesh, India. It is located in the Huzur tehsil and the Phanda block.

== Demographics ==
According to the 2011 census of India, Shyampur has 130 households. The effective literacy rate (i.e. the literacy rate of population excluding children aged 6 and below) is 73.79%.

Demographics (2011 Census)
	Total	Male	Female
Population	659	351	308
Children aged below 6 years	102	53	49
Scheduled caste	142	83	59
Scheduled tribe	7	4	3
Literates	411	247	164
Workers (all)	497	271	226
Main workers (total)	389	224	165
Main workers: Cultivators	186	102	84
Main workers: Agricultural labourers	181	109	72
Main workers: Household industry workers	10	4	6
Main workers: Other	12	9	3
Marginal workers (total)	108	47	61
Marginal workers: Cultivators	60	28	32
Marginal workers: Agricultural labourers	46	18	28
Marginal workers: Household industry workers	2	1	1
Marginal workers: Others	0	0	0
Non-workers	162	80	82
