= Biaora =

Biaora Biyavra, ब्यावरा
- City
- Biaora
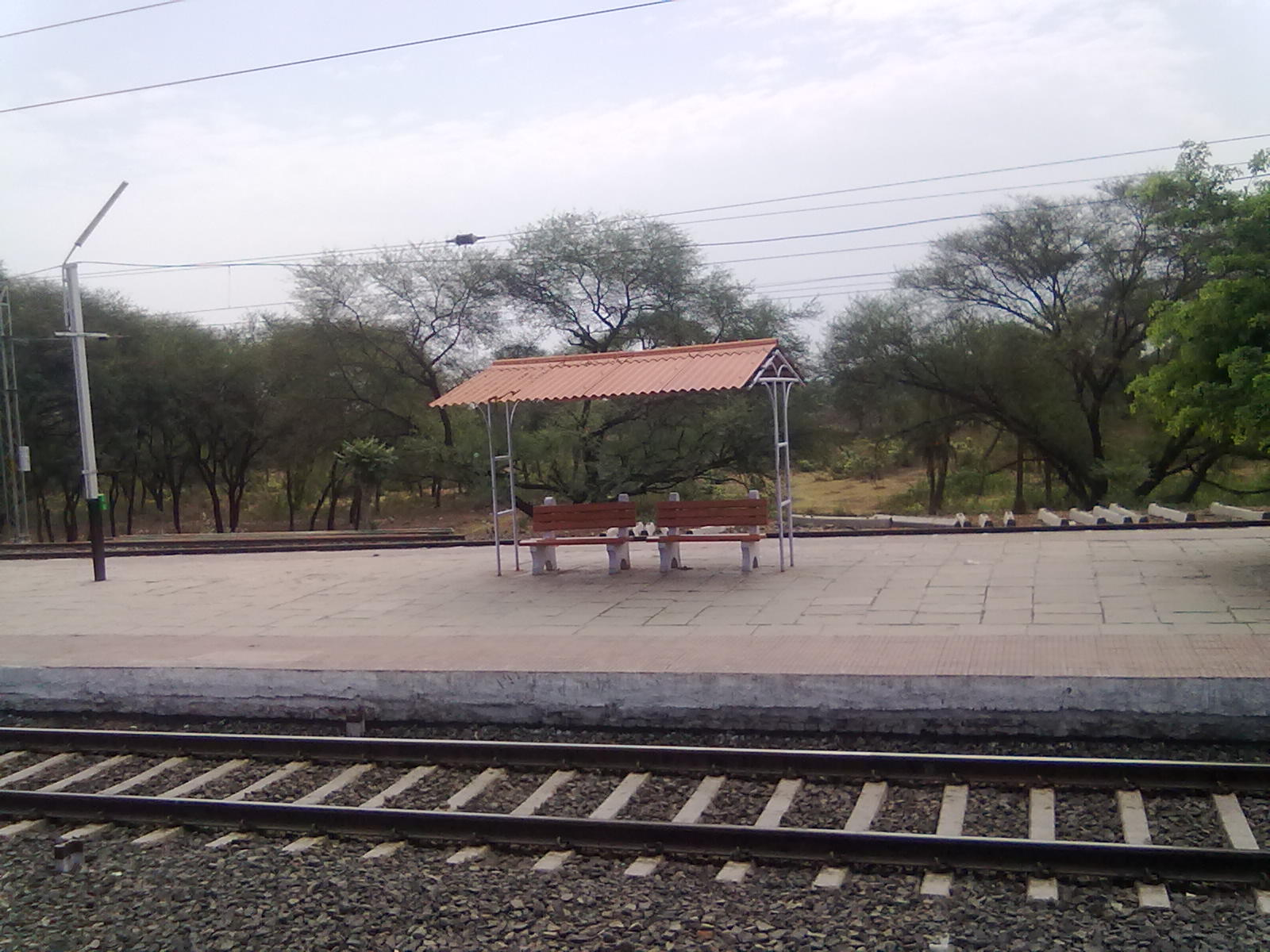
- Resting Shed at Biaora Railway Station

- Location within Madhya Pradesh
- Coordinates: 23.9194°N 76.9099°E
- Country: India
- State: Madhya Pradesh
- District: Rajgarh
- Established: 17th century
- Elevation: 415 m (1,362 ft)

Population (2011)
  - Total: 89,093
  - Density: 300/km^{2} (780/sq mi)

Languages
  - Official: Hindi
- Time zone: UTC+5:30 (IST)
- PIN: 465674
- 07374: 465674
- Vehicle registration: MP 39 XXXX

Biaora is a town (Tehsil) located in Rajgarh, Madhya Pradesh, India. With a population of around 220,887 people, the town is known for its distinctive architecture, rich history, and vibrant culture.

== History and language ==
Biaora was considered an important centre of trade and commerce during the medieval period and was ruled by various dynasties, including the Rajputs and the Marathas. The city was known as Biyasalpur in the 17th century.

The Malvi dialect spoken in Biaora is known as Umadwadi.

== Geography ==
Biaora is located at 23.87°N 76.92°E. It has an average elevation of 415 metres (1,362 ft). The town is at a distance of 110 kilometres from Bhopal, 184 km from Indore and 120 km from Vidisha.

The town lies at the northern edge of the Malwa plateau. Black soil, light red soil, and coarse sands are the main soil types available in Biaora. The Ajnar River flows through the city.

=== Climate ===
Biaora has a humid subtropical climate, with three main seasons: summer, monsoon, and winter. Summers start in mid-March. The weather can be extremely hot from April to May, with daytime temperatures sometimes reaching 45 to 48 °C (113 to 118 °F). Average summer temperatures range from 36 to 39 °C (97 to 102 °F), and humidity is generally low. Winters are moderate and usually dry. Minimum temperatures can be as low as 4 to 6 °C (39 to 43 °F), with a usual temperature range of 8 to 26 °C (46 to 79 °F). The monsoon season typically occurs from mid-June to mid-September, contributing 32 to 35 inches (81 to 89 cm) of annual rainfall. About 95% of the rain occurs during the monsoon season.

== Demographics ==
As of the 2011 census of India, Biaora had a population of 49,093. The town has an average literacy rate of 75%, higher than the national average. Around 15% of the population is under six years of age.

== Education ==
Biaora has the highest number of schools in the Rajgarh District, with over 20 private schools and several large government schools. PG College (formerly Subhas Chandra College), located on Rajgarh Road, is the city's only higher education institute.

== Notable people ==
21-year-old BSc student and environmental born in Biaora.

== Nearby attractions ==
Biaora is home to many notable examples of Rajput and Maratha architecture, including temples, palaces, and other historic buildings. It is known for its historical significance, hosting the ruins of an ancient fort and the Kali Mata Temple.

=== Anjani Laal Mandir ===
Multiple temples are located here.

=== Pashupati Nath Ghurel temple ===
The Pashupati Nath Ghurel temple is dedicated to Pashupati. Residents gather there for the annual Makar Sankranti fair.

=== Veshnodevi Temple Suthalia ===
Veshnodevi Temple is located 26 km from Biora, near Suthalia and the Maksudangarh–Latteri road. In this temple, Veshnodham Cave was also constructed imitating the Vaishno Devi Temple.

=== Mohanpura Dam ===
The Mohanpura Dam is located on the Nevaj River, approximately 16 km from Biaora's railway station. It is part of the Mohanpura–Kundalia lift irrigation project, delivering water using pressurized pipes. The dam project was initiated in 2014 to help farmers who were forced to migrate due to acute water scarcity seasonally, as well as provide water for domestic and industrial uses. The dam was inaugurated on June 23, 2018, costing 3,800 crore rupees. The catchment area intercepted at the dam site is 3,726 km^{2} and has a gross storage capacity of million cubic metres; as of 2024, it provided irrigation for 110,000 hectares, intending to irrigate 145,000 hectares.

== Transportation ==
National Highway 52, National Highway 46, and National Highway 752B pass through Biaora.

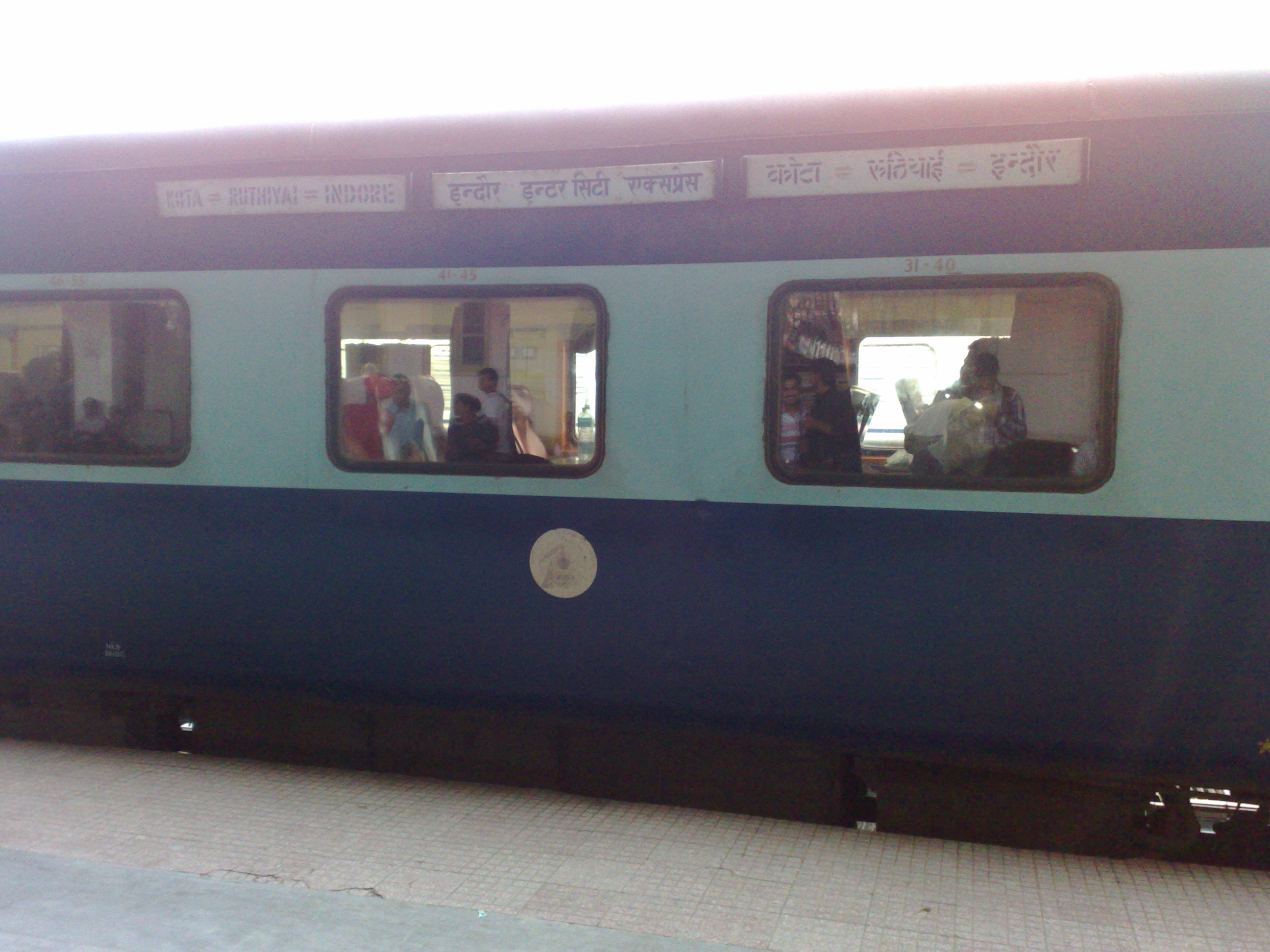
Kota-Indore Intercity train arriving at Biaora Railway Station

Biyavra Rajgarh Railway Station (BRRG) is a small railway station located in Biaora. It is situated off Mumbai-Agra Road (NH 46) and serves as a vital connection for passengers travelling between Indore and Bhopal. The station features two platforms and basic amenities such as ticket counters, waiting rooms, and public restrooms. BRRG/Biyavra Rajgarh is located on the Indore–Gwalior line.
