= Machalpur =

Machalpur Malwa
- Town
- Location in Madhya Pradesh, India
- Coordinates: 24.13°N 76.3°E
- Country: India
- State: Madhya Pradesh
- District: Rajgarh
- Elevation: 389 m (1,276 ft)

Population (2011)
  - Total: 9,476

Languages
  - Official: Hindi
- Time zone: UTC+5:30 (IST)
- ISO 3166 code: IN-MP
- Vehicle registration: MP

Machalpur is a town and a nagar parishad in Rajgarh district in the Indian state of Madhya Pradesh.

== Geography ==
Machalpur is located at 24.13°N 76.3°E. It has an average elevation of 389 metres (1,276 feet).

== Demographics ==
As of the 2011 Census of India, Machalpur had a population of 9,476. Males constitute 52% of the population and females 48%. Machalpur has an average literacy rate of 53%, lower than the national average of 59.5%: male literacy is 67%, and female literacy is 39%. In Machalpur, 17% of the population is under 6 years of age. it is near the border of Madhya Pradesh and Rajasthan where a mix of the Rajasthani and Malvi language is spoken.
