= Bakani =

- Census town
- Location in Rajasthan, India Bakani (India)
- Coordinates: 24.28°N 76.23°E
- Country: India
- State: Rajasthan
- District: Jhalawar
- Elevation: 354 m (1,161 ft)

Population (2001)
  - Total: 17,938

Languages
  - Official: Hindi
- Time zone: UTC+5:30 (IST)
- 326022: 326022
- ISO 3166 code: RJ-IN

Bakani is a census town in Jhalawar district in the state of Rajasthan, India. Bakani is 42 kilometres (26 mi) from its district headquarters, Jhalawar.

== Demographics ==
As of 2001 India census, Bakani had a population of 17938. Males constitute 52% of the population and females 48%. Bakani has a literacy rate of 65%, higher than the national average of 59.5%; with 62% of the males and 38% of females literate. 16% of the population is under 6 years of age. Khera is the nearest village to Bakani.
