= Khilchipur =

- Town
- Location in Madhya Pradesh, India Khilchipur (India)
- Coordinates: 24.03°N 76.57°E
- Country: India
- State: Madhya Pradesh
- District: Rajgarh
- Elevation: 394 m (1,293 ft)

Population (2011)
  - Total: 18,928

Languages
  - Official: Hindi
- Time zone: UTC+5:30 (IST)
- Postal code: 465679
- ISO 3166 code: IN-MP
- Vehicle registration: MP

Khilchipur is a town and a nagar panchayat in the Rajgarh district of the Indian state of Madhya Pradesh.

== History ==
Founded in 1544 by Dewan Ugra Sen, a Khichi Rajput. A Fort is also in the khilchipur which is situated near the gad ganga river. A grant of land was made to him by the Mughal Emperor, which included the adjoining Jirapur and Machalpur parganas, later a part of Indore state, and Shujalpur, later in Gwalior state. Currently Priyavrat Singh is owner of khilchipur fort. He is also a vidhayak MLA of khilchipur constituency. Khilchipur is also known as prem nagari, 11 miles and many different aspects – its food, culture, its natural landscapes, its languages, classical dances, Brahmakumari spirituality and many more. Khilchipur have some famous places like

•Astana of Peer Yazdani Sarkar where people from all over the world comes to take spiritual blessings

•Shani mandir where people come from nearby villages for blessings. It also have Dangi Darwaja and a fort to visit.

== Geography ==
Khilchipur is located at 24.03°N 76.57°E. It has an average elevation of 394 metres (1,292 feet).

== Demographics ==
As of 2001 India census Khilchipur had a population of 18,928. Males constitute 51% of the population and females 49%. Khilchipur has an average literacy rate of 61%, higher than the national average of 59.5%: male literacy is 72%, and female literacy is 51%. In Khilchipur, 16% of the population is under 6 years of age.

== Economy ==
Khilchipur comes under the category of very backward place, economically it is very weak. There is now new railway station in khilchipur. 465679 is pin code of Khilchipur. ACME Solar group establish his 25 MW plant in Khilchipur.
