= Susner =

Susner Susner
- Tehsil
- Location in Madhya Pradesh, India Susner (India)
- Coordinates: 23.95°N 76.08°E
- Country: India
- State: Madhya Pradesh
- District: Agar Malwa district
- Founder: Swargiy Seth Shree Lalchand Ji Jain sahab.

Area
  - Total: 3 km^{2} (1.2 sq mi)
- Elevation: 502 m (1,647 ft)

Population (2001)
  - Total: 13,440
  - Density: 4,500/km^{2} (12,000/sq mi)

Languages
  - Official: Hindi
- Time zone: UTC+5:30 (IST)
- ISO 3166 code: IN-MP
- Vehicle registration: MP

Susner is a town and a Nagar panchayat and Sub division in Agar Malwa district in the Madhya pradesh state of India. Its also a tehsil and an assembly.

== Geography ==
Susner is located at 23.95°N 76.08°E. It has an average elevation of 502 metres (1,646 feet).

== Demographics ==
As of 2001 India census, Susner had a population of 16,432. Males constitute 52% of the population and females 48%. Susner has an average literacy rate of 72%, higher than the national average of 59.5%: male literacy is 79%, and female literacy is 64%. In Susner, 16% of the population is under 6 years of age.

== Susner Assembly ==
Susner is one of the 230 Vidhan Sabha (Legislative Assembly) constituencies of Madhya Pradesh state in central India. Bhairon Singh is current MLA from Susner.

== Transportation ==
Susner is located on Ujjain-Kota National Highway Road. Susner is connected by private bus services to all nearest major cities.

The nearest airport is Bhopal Airport.
