= Bhopal division =

Administrative division of Madhya Pradesh, India

Coordinates: 23.2°N 77.4°E

Bhopal Division
- Location of Bhopal division in Madhya Pradesh
- Country: India
- State: Madhya Pradesh
- Headquarters: Bhopal
- Districts: 1. Bhopal; 2. Vidisha; 3. Raisen; 4. Rajgarh; 5. Sehore

Area
  - Total: 31,321 km^{2} (12,093 sq mi)

Population
  - Total: 8,018,679
  - Density: 256.02/km^{2} (663.08/sq mi)
- Time zone: UTC+05:30 (IST)
- Website: bhopaldivisionmp.nic.in

Bhopal Division is an administrative geographical unit of Madhya Pradesh state of central India. Bhopal is the administrative headquarters of the division. The division consists of districts of Bhopal, Raisen, Rajgarh, Sehore, and Vidisha.

Before they were merged into Madhya Pradesh in 1956, Bhopal, Sehore, and Raisen districts were part of the former Bhopal State, and Vidisha was part of the former Madhya Bharat state.
