= Rajgarh, Madhya Pradesh =

Rajgarh Rajghur
- City
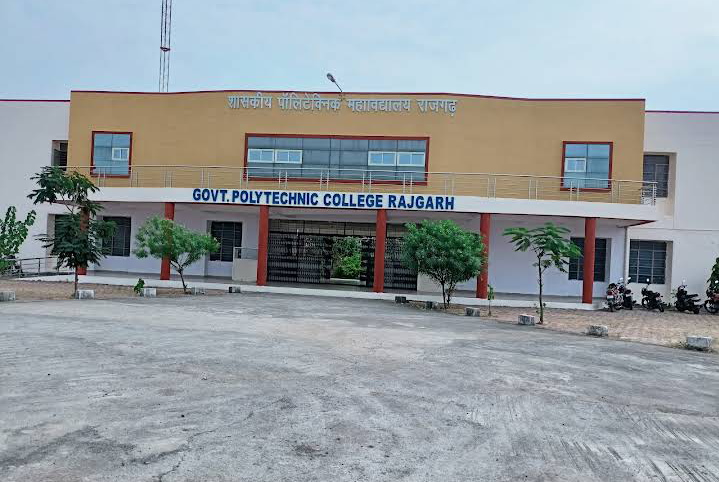
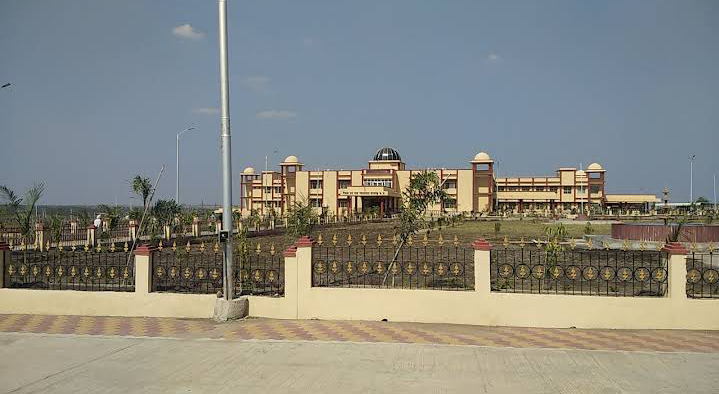
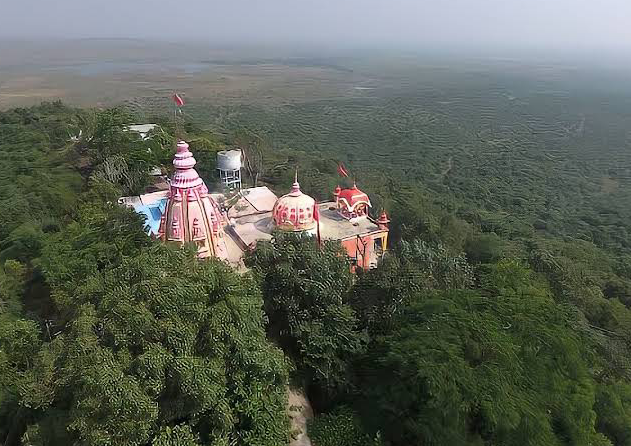
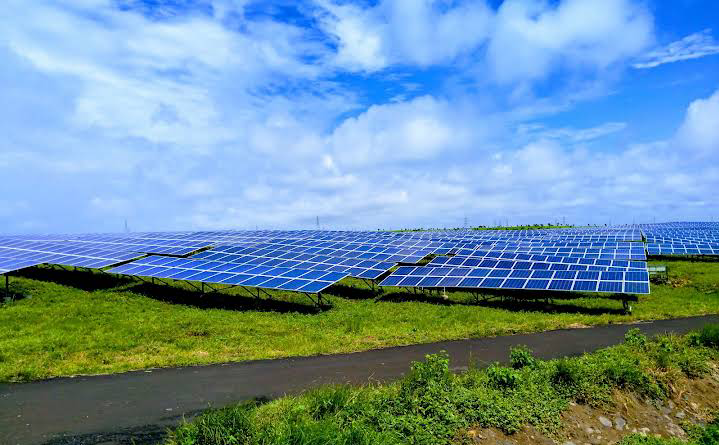
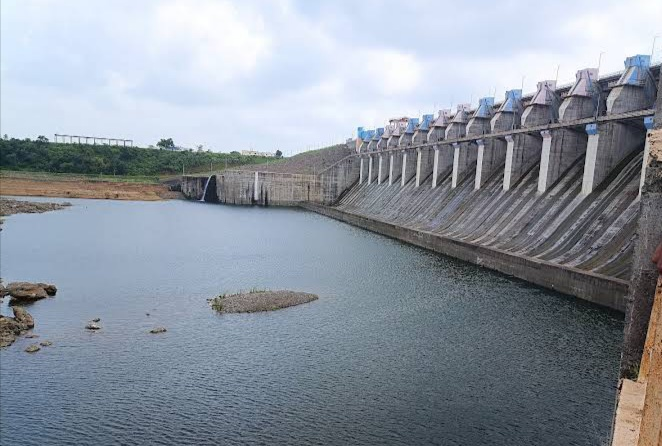
- Polytechnic College of Rajgarh Administrative Headquarter of Rajgarh Jalpa Mata Mandir NTPC Solar Plant Rajgarh Mohanpura Dam Rajgarh

- Location in Madhya Pradesh, India Rajgarh (India)
- Coordinates: 24.03°N 76.88°E
- Country: India
- State: Madhya Pradesh
- District: Rajgarh

Government
  - Member of Parliament Rajgarh: Rodmal Nagar (BJP)
  - Member of Legislative Assembly Rajgarh: Bapu singh tanwar (INC)

Area
  - Total: 1,105 km^{2} (427 sq mi)
- Elevation: 491 m (1,611 ft)

Population (2011)
  - Total: 45,726
  - Density: 41.38/km^{2} (107.2/sq mi)
- Demonym: Rajgarhians

Languages
  - Official: Hindi
- Time zone: UTC+5:30 (IST)
- PIN: 465661
- Telephone code: 07372
- ISO 3166 code: IN-MP
- Vehicle registration: MP-39
- Sex ratio: 1000/956 ♂/♀
- Website: rajgarh.nic.in

Rajgarh is a city and a municipality in the Indian state of Madhya Pradesh. It serves as the administrative headquarters of Rajgarh district. Historically, it was the capital of the former princely state of Rajgarh State during the British Raj. The old city is located in the Malwa region and is enclosed by a battlemented wall.

Rajgarh district is known for the Mohanpura and Kundalia Irrigation Projects, among the most significant contemporary water infrastructure developments in the region. Designed to alleviate water scarcity in one of Madhya Pradesh's driest zones, these projects provide irrigation to over 290,000 hectares and supply water to approximately 1,300 villages, benefiting more than 500,000 farmers.

== Geography ==
Rajgarh district is located in the northern part of Malwa Plateau & Rajgarh is almost in the middle of the district. It forms the North Western part of Division of Bhopal Commissioner. Rajgarh District extends between the parallels of Latitude 23027' 12" North and 24017' 20" North and between the meridians of Longitude 76011' 15" and 77014' East. It has a Quadrangular shape with the Northern and Western sides longer than the Southern and Eastern sides respectively. The zigzag boundaries of the District resemble a pear. Rajgarh District is bounded by Shajapur District in the South as well as west. The District of Sehore, Bhopal, Guna and Jhalawar (Rajasthan) enclose it from the South-East, East, North-East, and North directions respectively. The total Geographical area of the District is 6,154 km2. with a population of 1,545,814 according to census 2011.

It is about 145 km north-west from the state capital Bhopal & 198 km from Indore. Newaj River flows from Rajgarh town.

== Climate ==
Climate data for Rajgarh (1991–2020, extremes 1955–2011)
| Month | Jan | Feb | Mar | Apr | May | Jun | Jul | Aug | Sep | Oct | Nov | Dec | Year |
|---|---|---|---|---|---|---|---|---|---|---|---|---|---|
| Record high °C (°F) | 33.8 (92.8) | 38.2 (100.8) | 42.1 (107.8) | 46.3 (115.3) | 46.8 (116.2) | 48.3 (118.9) | 43.6 (110.5) | 39.0 (102.2) | 39.0 (102.2) | 39.3 (102.7) | 37.2 (99.0) | 35.8 (96.4) | 48.3 (118.9) |
| Mean daily maximum °C (°F) | 25.9 (78.6) | 29.0 (84.2) | 35.0 (95.0) | 39.5 (103.1) | 42.2 (108.0) | 39.2 (102.6) | 32.8 (91.0) | 30.4 (86.7) | 32.4 (90.3) | 34.2 (93.6) | 31.1 (88.0) | 28.2 (82.8) | 33.3 (91.9) |
| Mean daily minimum °C (°F) | 8.5 (47.3) | 11.4 (52.5) | 17.0 (62.6) | 22.5 (72.5) | 27.4 (81.3) | 26.8 (80.2) | 24.4 (75.9) | 23.3 (73.9) | 22.2 (72.0) | 17.9 (64.2) | 13.2 (55.8) | 9.1 (48.4) | 18.6 (65.5) |
| Record low °C (°F) | 1.3 (34.3) | 1.2 (34.2) | 5.7 (42.3) | 12.3 (54.1) | 16.7 (62.1) | 16.8 (62.2) | 16.2 (61.2) | 18.2 (64.8) | 13.8 (56.8) | 9.1 (48.4) | 4.3 (39.7) | 0.0 (32.0) | 0.0 (32.0) |
| Average rainfall mm (inches) | 0.3 (0.01) | 0.9 (0.04) | 0.4 (0.02) | 0.9 (0.04) | 2.0 (0.08) | 57.5 (2.26) | 147.4 (5.80) | 166.5 (6.56) | 36.2 (1.43) | 4.4 (0.17) | 2.8 (0.11) | 1.5 (0.06) | 421.0 (16.57) |
| Average rainy days | 0.0 | 0.3 | 0.1 | 0.1 | 0.3 | 2.9 | 6.9 | 8.6 | 3.1 | 0.4 | 0.2 | 0.2 | 22.9 |
| Average relative humidity (%) (at 17:30 IST) | 41 | 35 | 28 | 27 | 28 | 47 | 70 | 77 | 66 | 46 | 42 | 43 | 46 |
Source: India Meteorological Department

== Demographics ==
As of the 2011 Census of India, Rajgarh had a population of 29,726. Males constitute 52% of the population and females 48%. Rajgarh has an average literacy rate of 70%, higher than the national average of 59.5%: male literacy is 78%, and female literacy is 61%. In Rajgarh, 14% of the population is under 6 years of age.

Religions in Rajgarh
| Religion | Percent |
| Hindus | 75% |
| Muslims | 20% |
| Jains | 3.7% |
| Others† | 1.3% |
Distribution of religions †Includes Sikhs (0.2%), Buddhists (<0.2%).

== Governance and administration ==
Rajgarh Vidhan Sabha seat is one of the seats in Madhya Pradesh Legislative Assembly in India. It is a segment of Rajgarh Lok Sabha seat.

Rajgarh is a Municipality city in district of Rajgarh, Madhya Pradesh. The Rajgarh city is divided into 15 wards for which elections are held every 5 years.

Rajgarh Municipality has total administration over 5,847 houses to which it supplies basic amenities like water and sewerage. It is also authorize to build roads within Municipality limits and impose taxes on properties coming under its jurisdiction.

== Education institutes ==
School and College's

- Jawahar navodaya vidyalaya, Rajgarh
- Govt. Excellence School, Rajgarh
- Govt. Post Graduation College, Rajgarh
- Govt. Polytechnic College, Rajgarh
- Industrial Training Institute, ITI College, Rajgarh

== Places of interest ==
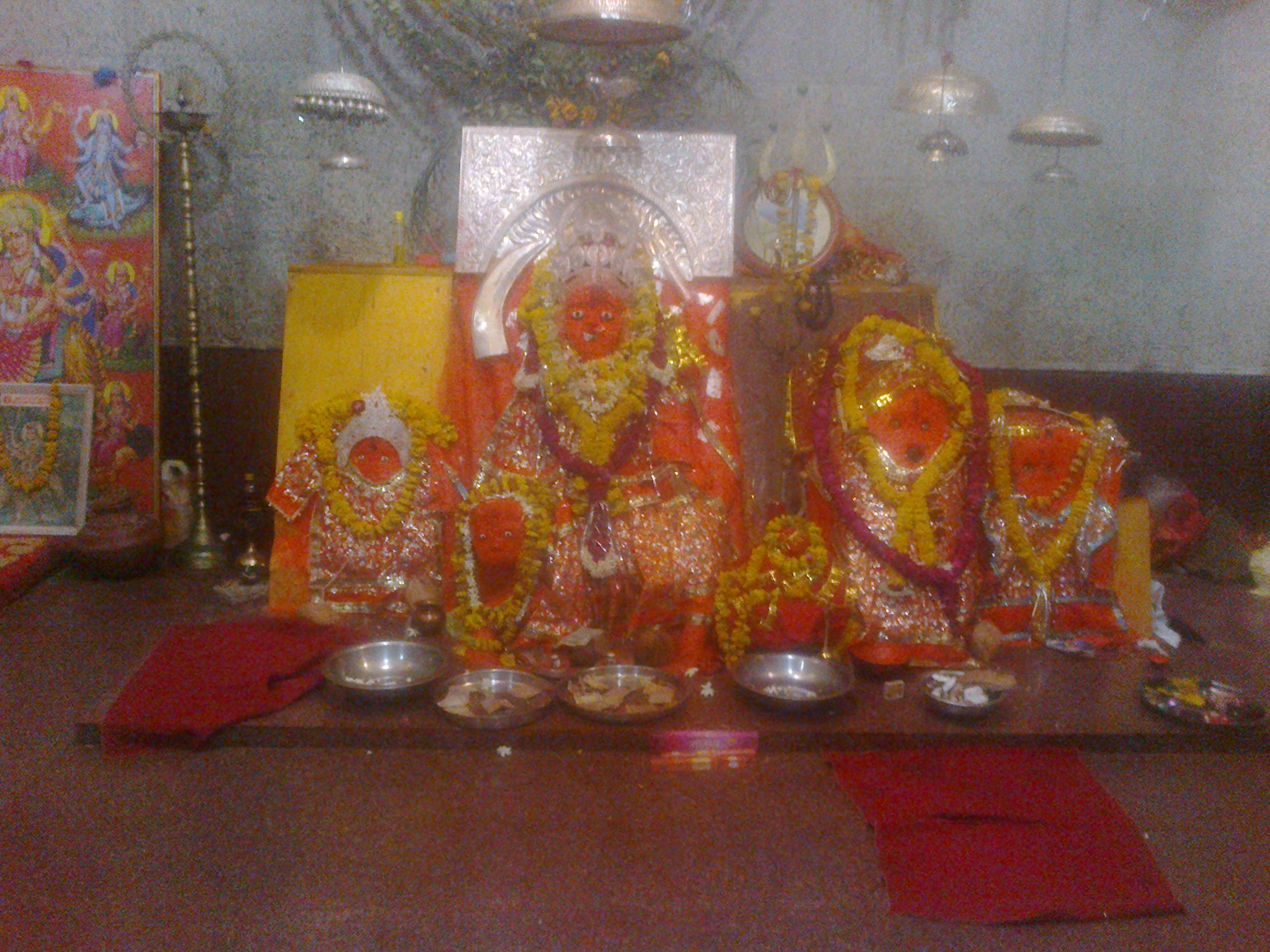
Jalpa Mata Temple

- Jalpa Mata Mandir - A unique confluence of devotion and patriotism can be seen on Durga Ashtami in the ancient Maa Jalpa Devi temple situated on a high hill of Rajgarh. A large number of devotees from Madhya Pradesh, Rajasthan, Gujarat, Maharashtra and Uttar Pradesh come for darshan.
- Shrinath Ji Mandir - The temple is dedicated to Shrinathji (a form of Lord Krishna) and is an important religious place of the Pushtimarg sect. This temple is built among the hills on the banks of River Nevaj and is famous for its beauty and architecture.

== Economy ==
Black cotton soil locally known as kalmat (black soil) or chikat-kali (deep black) is highly fertile and retains moisture. It supports both kharif and rabi crops with or without irrigation. Major crops gown in this soil include wheat, gram, jowar and cotton.

It is situated in Jaitpura and Ganeshpura. NTPC's 50 MW Rajgarh solar power project in Madhya Pradesh is the biggest solar photovoltaic plant in the country using domestically manufactured modules. The 50 MW plant in Rajgarh, which was set up by Tata Power Solar.

== Transportation ==
Rajgarh is well connected with major cities of the state. Many National Highways and State Highways pass through Rajgarh. Indore is 190 km and Bhopal is 115 km away from Rajgarh.

Daily bus service is available in Rajgarh. Buses connect it to nearby villages and towns.

Rajgarh will have a train station on the Bhopal-Ramganj Mandi Railway Line when it opens.
