= Pachore =

- Town
- Location in Madhya Pradesh, India Pachore (India)
- Coordinates: 23.42°N 76.43°E
- Country: India
- State: Madhya Pradesh
- District: Rajgarh

Population (2011)
  - Total: 35,000
- Time zone: UTC+5:30 (IST)
- PIN: 465683
- Telephone code: 7371
- ISO 3166 code: IN-MP
- Vehicle registration: MP 39

Pachore is a Tahsil Place and a nagar panchayat in Rajgarh district of Madhya Pradesh in India. It is situated on Agra-Bombay Road - NH 52 at the bank of the river Nevaj. Pachore Mandi is the biggest Mandi (B Grade) of Rajgarh District.

== Demographics ==
As of 2001 India census, Pachore had a population of 20,940. Males constitute 53% of the population and females 47%. Pachore has an average literacy rate of 59%, which is lower than the national average of 59.5%; male literacy is 68% and female literacy is 48%. In Pachore, 17% of the population is under 6 years of age.

The main language spoken in Pachore is Hindi, along with Malvi (a regional language and local dialect of Hindi, generally spoken in rural parts of the tehsil).

== Economy ==
The land surrounding Pachore is extremely fertile. The main crops grown are wheat, soya and gram.

== Education ==
Many government offices, schools and colleges operate in Pachore, including Government Veer Savarkar College, Government Polytechnic College, Government Boys H.S.S. and Government Girls H.S.S. Jawahar Navodaya Vidyalaya is around 5 km away.

Private educational institutions Providence Convent School, Sanskar Academy Pachore, Prof. Santosh Mittal H.S.School, Granth prerna public high school, Pragya Sagar College, Sanskar Public Academy, and Saraswati Shishu Mandir. The alumni are spread out in various places across the globe.

== Health services ==
Pachore has a government hospital and an ambulance. Several practitioners operate private clinics.

== Religion ==
Pachore is a secular town. People of several religions live peacefully there.Temples in Pachore include the Lord Mahaveer Jain chaity alag located at Jeen press colony. The Hanuman temple is the biggest temple, founded by Shri Bhaddhai Patel (kushwah) (1885–1943). The Shiva temple is the oldest. Ramayan has been recited continuously there since February 1984. The Shiva temple is historic. Legend says that it had flown in the air centuries ago. Another one is Maa Dayalu temple, which is also a Siddhpeeth,

== Geography ==
Thikana Baredi (AKA Maharaja sa ki Baredi): Rajputana - Ancient Jagir and the place of Parmar(Umath) Rajput located at the bank of the river Nevaj at a distance of 5 km from Pachore.

Bilapura is a small village near Pachore that also constitutes ward no. 1 in Pachore Nagar Panchayat.

Bhojpuriya is ward no. 5 of Pachore Nagar Panchayat.

Other villages surrounding Pachore include Dultariya, Damdiya, Bokdi, Kadiya (Sansi), Napliya Khedi, Badal Khedi, Mohanpura, Mitthanpur and Saredi Pura.

Kadiya Chourasi is a small township nearby.

== Transport ==
- Pachor Road railway station is situated on Indore–Gwalior line under the Bhopal railway division.
- The nearest airport is in Bhopal, Raja Bhoj Airport.
