= Rajgarh district =

- District of Madhya Pradesh
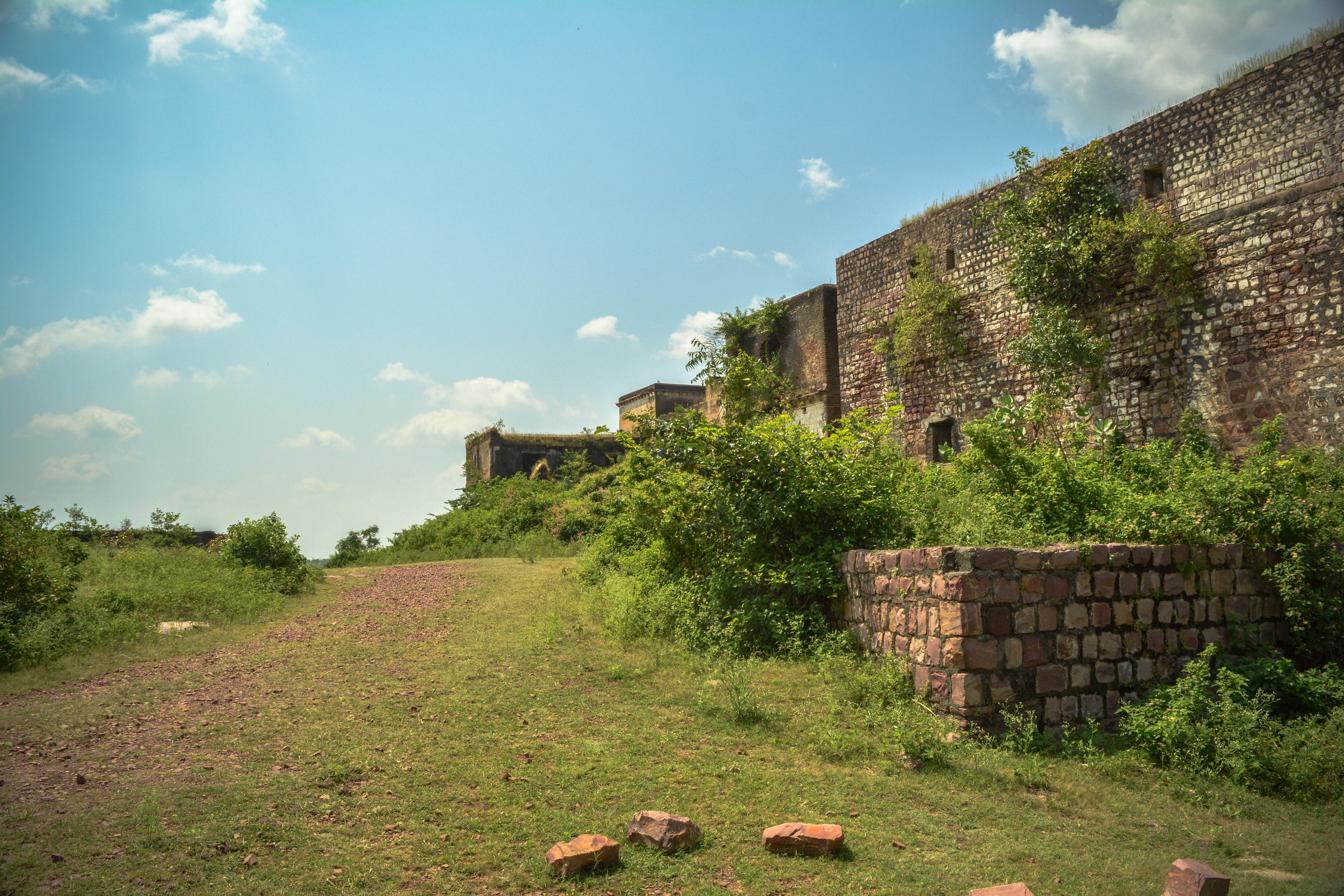
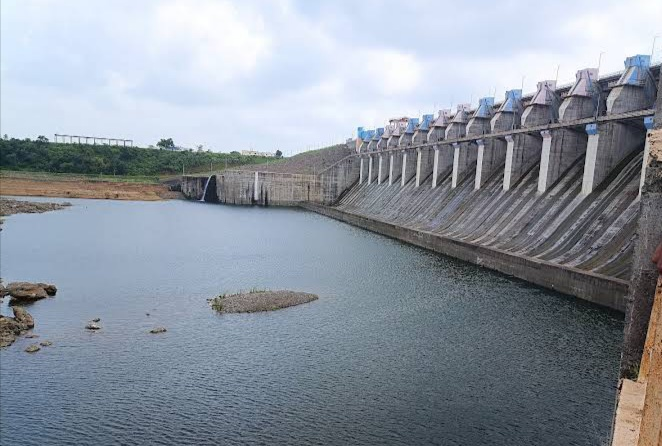
- Narsingarh Fort Mohanpura Dam

- Location of Rajgarh district in Madhya Pradesh
- Country: India
- State: Madhya Pradesh
- Division: Bhopal
- Headquarters: Rajgarh (Madhya Pradesh)
- Tehsils: 8

Government
  - Lok Sabha constituencies: Rajgarh

Area
  - Total: 6,154 km^{2} (2,376 sq mi)

Population (2011)
  - Total: 1,545,814
  - Density: 251.2/km^{2} (650.6/sq mi)

Demographics
  - Literacy: 61.21 %
- Time zone: UTC+05:30 (IST)
- Major highways: NH-3, NH-46
- Website: rajgarh.nic.in/en/

Rajgarh district (Hindi pronunciation: [ɾaːd͡ʒgəɽʱ]) is a district of Madhya Pradesh in central India. The city of Rajgarh is the administrative headquarters of the district. The old name of Rajgarh was Jhanjhanipur. Rajgarh in Madhya Pradesh is one of the aspirational districts selected by Government of India. The district has an area of 6,154 km^{2} and the population is 1,545,814 (2011 census). The district lies on the northern edge of the Malwa plateau, and the Parbati River forms the eastern boundary of the district, while the Kali Sindh River forms the western boundary. The district has seven tehsils, Rajgarh, Khilchipur, Jirapur, Biaora, Narsinghgarh, Sarangpur and Pachore. The district is bounded by Rajasthan state to the north, and by the districts of Guna to the northeast, Bhopal to the east, Sehore to the southeast, and Shajapur to the south and west. It is part of Bhopal Division. There are 1728 villages in Rajgarh.

The district was created May 1948, and includes the territory of the former princely states of Rajgarh, Narsinghgarh, Khilchipur, and parts of the states of Dewas Junior and Senior (Sarangpur tehsil) and Indore (Jirapur tehsil, now part of Khilchipur tehsil).

In addition to the town of Rajgarh, Khilchipur, Kotravihar, Narsinghgarh and Kurawar are places of interest.

== Topography ==
The District lies on the northern edge of the Malwa Plateau, and the Parvati River forms the eastern boundary of the district, while the Kalisindh River forms the western boundary. Black soil, light red and core sands are the main soil type available in the district.

== History ==
The district takes its name from the headquarters town Rajgarh. Rajgarh District was constituted after the formation of Madhya Bharat in May, 1948. Prior to this the area of the present District was parceled out among the States of Rajgarh, Narsinghgarh, Khilchipur, Dewas (Senior) Dewas (Junior) and Indore. Rajgarh was the headquarters of a mediatised State, ruled by the Umath Rajputs (a branch of the Paramaras), they enjoyed a Sanad Estate under the Sultans of Delhi and Mughal emperors in succession. The first capital was Duparia, now in Shajapur District. Later on it was shifted to Dungarpur (19 km from Rajgarh) and then to Ratanpur (19 km west of Narsinghgarh) and back. In order to avoid disturbance by the frequently passing Mughal armies, the Ruler of the Estate, Mohan Singh, acquired the present side, originally known as Jhanjhanipur from the Bhils in A.D. 1640. Finally he shifted the headquarters in the year 1645, giving the place its present name.

During the reign of Akbar (1556–1605) a Khilat and a Sanad were granted to Udaji of Tatanpur. At that time, Sarangpur was a Sarkar in the Subah of Malwa. Its jurisdiction extended from the western part of present Sehore District to the eastern part of Ujjain District. Among its twentyfour mahals many have retained their original names and are identified as Ashtah, Talain (Talen), Agra (Agar), Bajilpur (Bijilpur), Bhorsah, Khiljipur, Jirapur, Sarangpur, Sondarsi (Sundarsi), Sosner (Sunner) Sajapur, Kayath and Navgam (Tarana)1. In 1908, Rajgarh State was divided into seven Parganas, namely Newalganj, Biaora, Kalipith, Karanwas, Kotra, Seogarh and Talen. Narsinghgarh State was divided into four Parganas, namely Huzur (Narsinghgarh), Pachor, Khujner and Chhapera. The Parganas were placed in the charge of a Tahsildar each for revenue matters and magisterial work. 2 Khilchipur State was divided into three Paraganas. Sarangpur was as now, the tehsil headquarters of Dewas (Senior) and Dewas (Junior) States. Jarapur was a tehsil of Mahidpur District of former Indore State. It has now been abolished and merged in Khilchipur tahsil.

In 1645 with the permission of Rajmata, Deewan Ajab Singh defeated the Bhils in the hilly region of Rajgarh and he constructed a Palace in 1745 which was having five main gates namely, Itwaria, Bhudwaria, Surajpol, Panradia and Naya Darwaja. And it constitutes three very ancient temple namely Raj Rajeshwar Temple, Chatubhujnathji Temple and Narsingh Temple, and in which Rajmata and his 15-year-old son Rawat Mohan singh was living safely. In Jhanjherpur which was capital and it is having a palace due to which this place is known as Rajgarh and it had become famous.

== Economy ==
=== Agriculture ===
Soil and cropping pattern :- The first and the most predominant black cotton soil known as kalmat (black soil) or chikat-kali (deep black) are highly fertile with great power of retaining moisture and bears kharif and rabi crops with or without irrigation. Besides suitability, the black soil yields wheat, gram, jowar and cotton crops.

=== Pilukhedi Industrial Area ===
Pilukhedi is an industrial area in Rajgarh district which has been developed by MP government. Many small and medium scale industries have been established in Pilukhedi, this area is continuously developing due to its proximity to Bhopal.The main industries here are Flour Mills, Food Processing Units, Steel Furniture, Readymade Garments, Embroidery Work, Wooden Furniture, As major industries are established.

=== Solar Power Plant ===
It is situated in Jaitpura, Ganeshpura and Khilchipur. NTPC's 50 MW Rajgarh solar power project in Madhya Pradesh is the biggest solar photovoltaic plant in the country using domestically manufactured modules. The 50 MW plant in Rajgarh, which was set up by Tata Power Solar And ACME Solar group establish his 25 MW plant in Khilchipur

In 2006 the Ministry of Panchayati Raj named Rajgarh one of the country's 250 most backward districts (out of a total of 640). It is one of the 24 districts in Madhya Pradesh currently receiving funds from the Backward Regions Grant Fund Programme (BRGF). Rajgarh is one of 84 district of NITI Ayog's Aspirational district Program.

== Demographics ==
Historical population
Year	Pop.	±% p.a.
1901	274,676	—
1911	347,311	+2.37%
1921	325,082	−0.66%
1931	366,303	+1.20%
1941	401,933	+0.93%
1951	427,523	+0.62%
1961	516,871	+1.92%
1971	644,346	+2.23%
1981	801,384	+2.21%
1991	992,764	+2.16%
2001	1,254,085	+2.36%
2011	1,545,814	+2.11%

According to the 2011 census Rajgarh District has a population of 1,545,814, which is more than that of nations like Eswatini or Mauritius This gives it a ranking of 322nd in India (out of a total of 640). The district has a population density of 251 inhabitants per square kilometre (650/sq mi). Its population growth rate over the decade 2001–2011 was 23.26%. Rajgarh has a sex ratio of 956 females for every 1000 males and a literacy rate of 61.21%. Scheduled Castes and Scheduled Tribes make up 19.13% and 3.48% of the population respectively.

Religions in Rajgarh district (2011)
Religion	Percent
Hindus	92.76%
Muslims	6.92%
Other or not stated	0.38%

Languages of Rajgarh district (2011)
1. Hindi (74.6%)
2. Malvi (24.2%)
3. Others (1.22%)

At the time of the 2011 Census of India, 74.58% of the population in the district spoke Hindi and 24.20% Malvi as their first language.

== Divisions ==
9 Tehsils in Rajgarh District :

1. Rajgarh,
2. Khilchipur,
3. Biaora,
4. Sarangpur,
5. Narsinghgarh
6. jirapur,
7. Pachore,
8. Khujner,
9. Suthaliya

== Education ==
ECGC, a premier Export Credit Agency (ECA) of Government of India (GOI) has earmarked Rs.2.50 crores during Financial Year 2018-19 for education projects including supporting secondary education of girls in Rajgarh, Madhya Pradesh.

== Newaj River ==
The Newaj is left bank tributary of the river Parwan which is a right bank principal tributary of the Kalisindh. The Newaj River rises at an elevation of 634 m in the Astha tehsil of the Sehore district in Madhya Pradesh and traverses a total length of 220 km, out of which 205 km is in Madhya Pradesh. The Mohanpura dam site is located in Mohanpura Village of Biaora tehsil of Rajgarh.

== Climate ==
The district has dry climate except in the south-west monsoon season. The year may be divided into four seasons. The period from March to the second week of June is the summer season. The succeeding period up to the end of September is the south-west monsoon season. October and November constitute the postmonsoon or retreating monsoon season. The cold season is from December to February. The annual rainfall in the district is 813.6 mm. About 93 percent of the annual rainfall in the district is received during the monsoon June to September. In Rajgarh and Khilchipur tahsils-bordering Rajasthan, the rainfall is generally below the district average.

=== Forest ===
The forests of the district belong to the dry deciduous mixed and scrub types. Mostly their timber value is small. The eastern forests are better than those in the western and central belts. The common species of the forests are dhow (Anogeissus latifolia), khair (Acacia catechu), ber (Ziziphus jujuba), karondi (Carissa spinarum), kardhai (Anogeissus pendula), babul (Acacia arabica), achar (Buchanania latifolia), chheola (Butea frondosa), and tendu (Diospyros melanoxylon). In the village forests there was a good number of chandan (Santalum album) trees in Sarangpur tahsil. The common trees of the village areas araam (Mangifera indica), babul (Acacia arabica), ber (Ziziphus jujuba), gular (Ficus glomerata), khakra or chheola (Butea frondosa), mahuta (Bassia latifolia), nim (Melia indica) and papal (Ficus religiosa). Jamun (Eugenia jambolana) occurs along the nala banks as does the khajur (Phoenix dactylifera).

== Rajgarh tourism ==
=== Shri Tirupati Balaji Mandir Zirapur ===
Every year lakhs of people visit at Tirupati Dev, situated in south of India. One of the devotee from Zirapur, District Rajgarh of M.P. is Shri Om Prakash Mundra & his wife Shakuntala. When this couple reached to have darshan of Tirupati Balajee, a thought came in their mind to build a similar grand temple in Zirapur. It was a dream of Late Shri Kishanjee Mundra, resident of Baikunth and father of Shri O.P. Mundra to have such a grand temple at Zirapur also. Mundra couple then & their determined to construct the grand temple at Zirapur and returned to home town. Later they went with their other family members to Jhalariya Peeth situated at Didwana, (Rajasthan) and met Shree 1008 Shree Swami Shri Ghanshyamacharyajee Maharaj to detail about their dream. Swamijee immediately gave his consent for this great work. The starting was with the formation of Shree Shridhar Gyan Prasar Parmarthik Trust under the guidance of Swamijee Maharaj. Thereafter on 3 September 1998 at Zirapur, a town of Shri S.K. MLmdra with a small population of 25000 people, foundation of Balaji Temple was laid by Swami Shree Ghanshyamacharyajee Maharaj. The construction of temple took about 2 years. From 29 April to 4 May 2000 Pran Pratishtha Samaroh was conducted and Vyankatesh Lord Balajee temple was opened for public, and since then every day 2000–2500 devotees come here to have darshan and-get their wish fulfilled.

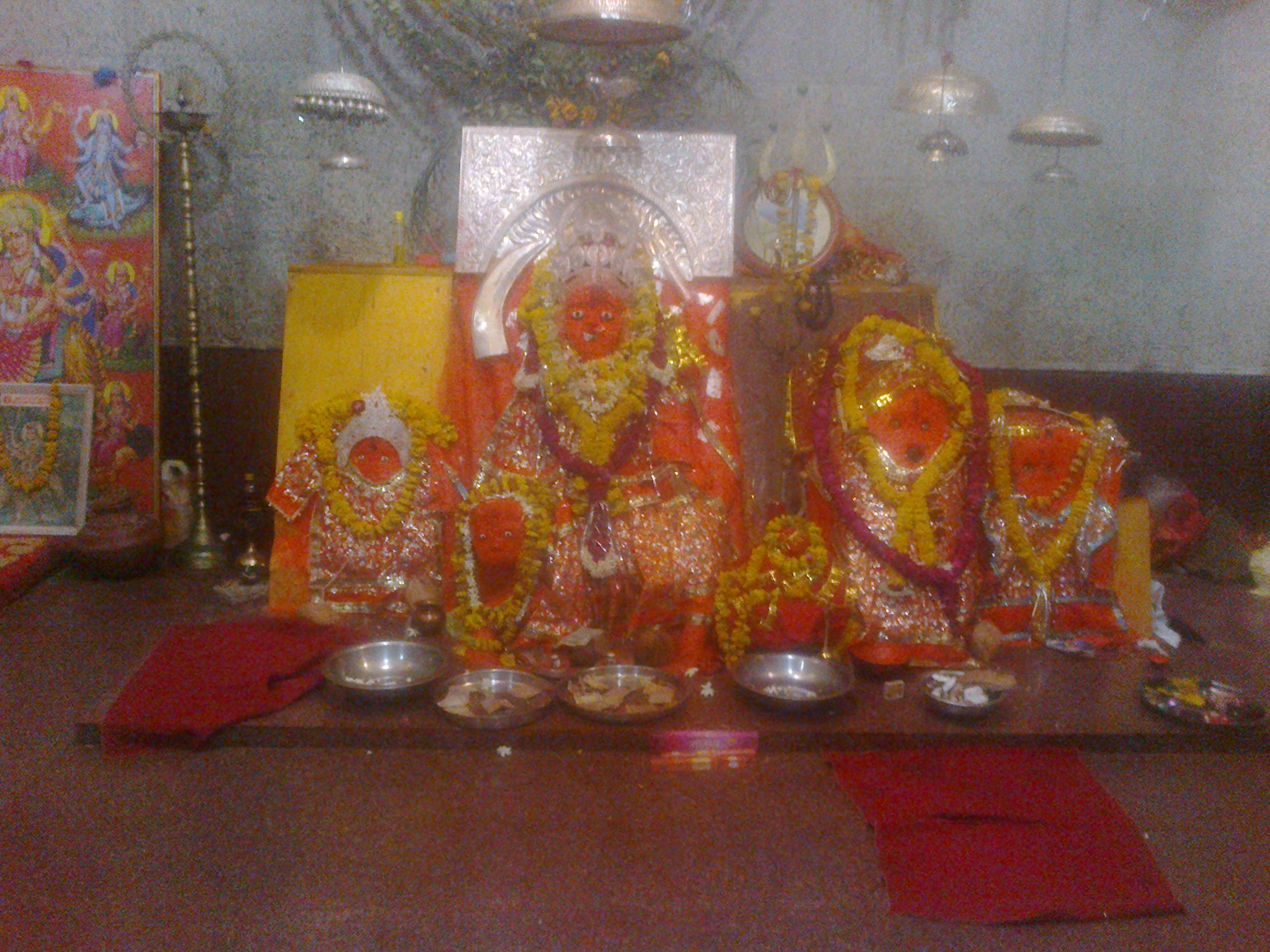
Jalpa Mata Temple

=== Jalpa Mata Temple ===
A famous temple of maa durga situated 6 km from rajgarh city on the top of the hill. Raja Umath of Rajgarh had once worshiped the mother to protect people. due to which the mother herself appeared here. Here every year 1111 meters long Chunar is taken from rajmahal to the court of Mata Rani.

=== Sakha shyamji temple ===
The temple of Shyamji (lord Vishnu) was built in the memory of the king Sangram Singh (Shyam Singh) by his wife Bhagyawati near parvati river in a village Kotra. During the 16-17th century, the king died in an encounter with a mughal soldier of Haji Wali. Temple contain many wall arts. The temple is protected by the state govt.

== Dams in Rajgarh ==
=== Kundaliya Dam ===
The major dam constructed in 2018 near Zirapur is called Kundaliya. The Dam is constructed with the purpose of supplying pressurized water for farmers of nearly 419 villages to facilitate micro irrigation in their fields in Rajgarh and Agar malwa districts. The dam also serves the purpose of drinking water in both the districts.

=== Mohanpura Dam ===
A dam has been built on the Newaj river, 8 kilometers away from Rajgarh. The catchment area of the dam is 3726 square km. Water will be provided in the dam for irrigation, domestic and industrial use. It is proposed to irrigate about 35500 hectares in Kharif and 62250 hectares in Rabi season from the dam.

== Notable people ==
- Ajijan Bai, Indian women freedom fighter.

== See also ==
- Udankhedi
- Narsinghgarh Wildlife Sanctuary
