= Tuman =

Tuman or Tumen may refer to:

- Tumen River, a river between China and North Korea
- Tuman River, a river in Shufu County, Xinjiang, China
- Tuman (Soviet patrol boat), a 1931 Soviet World War II warship
- Tuman bay II (died 1517), medieval Egyptian sultan
- Tuman Monastery, a monastery in eastern Serbia
- Tuman Tumanian (1879–1906), participant of the Armenian national liberation movement
- Tuman (album), by Sofia Rotaru
- "Tuman" (song), by the Russian band Kommunizm
- Tuman, Chhattisgarh, a village in Chhattisgarh, India

== See also ==
- Iranian toman, an Iranian currency
- Teoman, a Turkish given name used for Touman, leader of a nomadic tribe in Asia
- Tuman bay (disambiguation)
- Tumandar, a title given to the leader of a Baloch or Pashtoon tribe in Pakistan
- Tumen (disambiguation)
- Tyumen (disambiguation)
