= Nagda–Bina Passenger =

Train in India

Nagda - Bina Passenger Bina - Ratlam Passenger
Overview
- Service type: Passenger
- Current operator: Western Railway zone

Route
- Termini: Bina Junction (BINA); Ratlam Junction (RTM)
- Stops: 50
- Distance travelled: 471 km (293 mi)
- Average journey time: 12h
- Service frequency: Daily
- Train number: 59341/59342

On-board services
- Class: Unreserved
- Seating arrangements: No
- Sleeping arrangements: Yes
- Catering facilities: No
- Entertainment facilities: No

Technical
- Rolling stock: 2
- Track gauge: 1,676 mm (5 ft 6 in)
- Operating speed: 39 km/h (24 mph)

Nagda - Bina Passenger or Bina - Ratlam Passenger is a Passenger express train of the Indian Railways connecting Nagda Junction in Madhya Pradesh and Bina Junction in Madhya Pradesh. It is currently being operated with 53229/53230 train numbers on daily basis.

== Service ==
It averages 36 km/h as 59341 Nagda Bina Passenger starts from Nagda Junction covers 429 km in 11 hrs 50 mins and at 39 km/h as 53230 Bina - Ratlam Passenger starts from Bina Junction and covers 471 km in 12 hrs and ends it journey at Ratlam Junction.

== Route and halts ==
The important halts of the Nagda - Bina Passenger are :

- Nagda Junction
- Ujjain Junction
- Maksi Junction
- Shajapur
- Ruthiyai Junction
- Guna Junction
- Ashoknagar
- Piprai
- Bina Junction

The important halts of the Bina - Ratlam Passenger are :

- Bina Junction
- Ashoknagar
- Guna Junction
- Ruthiyai Junction
- Shajapur
- Maksi Junction
- Ujjain Junction
- Nagda Junction
- Ratlam Junction

== Traction ==
Both trains are hauled by a Ratlam Diesel Loco Shed based WDM-3A diesel locomotive.

== See also ==
- Ujjain Junction railway station
- Ratlam Junction railway station
- Bina Junction railway station
- Nagda Junction railway station
