= Ratikhera =

- Location within India
- Country: India
- State: Madhya Pradesh
- District: Ashoknagar

Languages
- Time zone: UTC+5:30 (IST)

Ratikhera is a village in Ashoknagar district of Madhya Pradesh state of India.
