= Ashoknagar, Madhya Pradesh =

Ashoknagar
- City
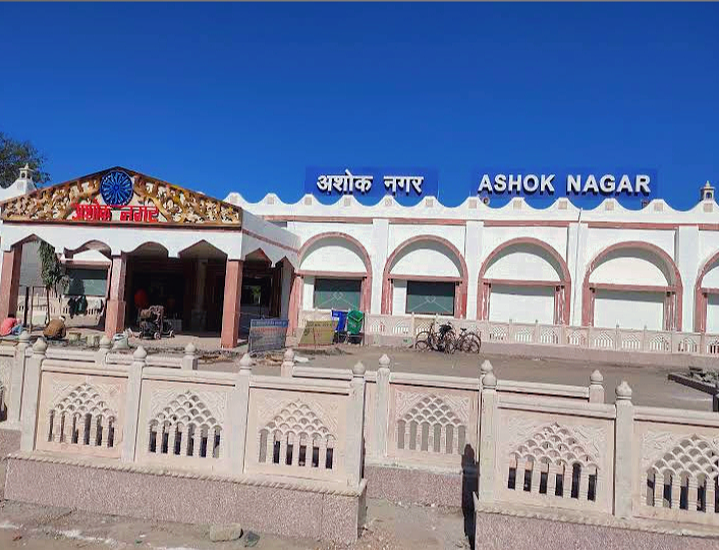
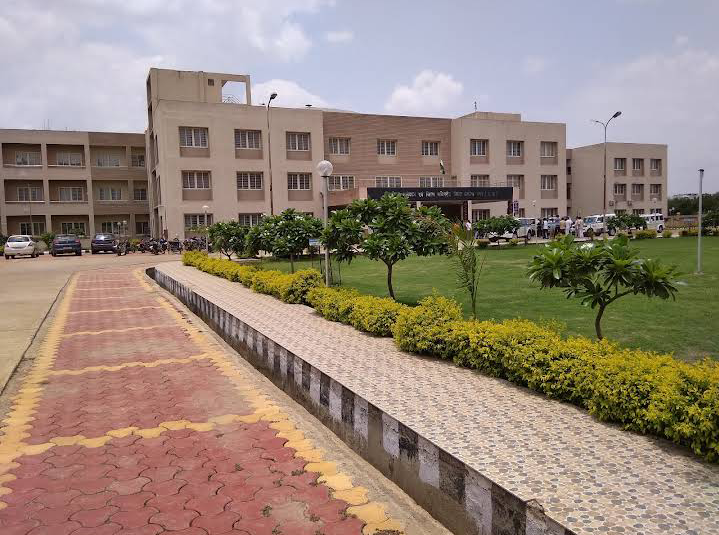
- Ashoknagar Railway Station; Collector Office Ashoknagar

- Location of Ashok nagar in the Central Indian state of Madhya Pradesh
- Coordinates: 24°34′48″N 77°43′48″E
- Country: India
- State: Madhya Pradesh
- Region: Bundelkhand
- District: Ashoknagar
- Named for: Great Emperor Ashoka

Government
  - Type: Municipality Council
  - Body: BJP
  - Chairman: Neeraj Manoriya

Area
  - Total: 57.3 km^{2} (22.1 sq mi)
- Elevation: 499 m (1,637 ft)

Population (2011)
  - Total: 81,828
  - Density: 1,430/km^{2} (3,700/sq mi)

Languages
  - Official: Hindi, Bundelkhandi (partly)
- Time zone: UTC+5:30 (IST)
- PIN: 473331
- Vehicle registration: MP-67
- Website: ashoknagar.nic.in

Ashoknagar (also Ashok Nagar) is a city and a municipality council in Ashoknagar District in Madhya Pradesh state of central India. It is the administrative headquarters of Ashoknagar District. Earlier it was part of Guna district. Ashoknagar is well known for its Grain Mandi and "Sharbati Gaihu", a type of wheat. The nearest city Guna 46 km from the city. Ashoknagar was formerly known as Pachar. The railway line passes from the middle of the city. Ashoknagar has a railway station and Two Bus stations. Ashoknagar is connected to the main cities of Madhya Pradesh by road and railway.

Ashoknagar is located in the northern part of Madhya Pradesh, between the rivers Sindh and the Betwa. It comes under the northern part of Malwa plateau, though main part of its district lies in the Bundelkhand Plateau. The eastern and western boundaries of the district are well defined by the rivers. The Betwa flows along the eastern boundary separating it from Sagar District and Lalitpur District, India of Uttar Pradesh. The Sindh is the main river flowing along the western boundary. Chanderi, a part of Ashoknagar, is famous for its brocades and muslins, especially for its handwoven Chanderi sarees. Ashoknagar is situated on the Kota-Bina railway section of Western Central Railway. Ashoknagar district has boundary to the border of UP in the east, about 87 km from Lalitpur in Uttar Pradesh. Ashoknagar is approximately 190 km away from the capital of the state Bhopal, 360 km from Indore, 153 km from Jhansi and about 250 km from Gwalior.

== Etymology ==
It is believed that Great Emperor Asoka, while on his trip to conquer Ujjain, had spent a night in Ashoknagar and hence the name.

== History ==
History of the town goes back around the ancient Indian Mahabharat, according to many early historians, Ashoknagar town was a part of Chedi Kingdom along with Chanderi.

Rather than this, In the 19th and early 20th century, the town being a part of Ishagarh District of Scindhiyas of Gwalior. In the late 20th century, Ashoknagar was known as PACHHAR. Later on it was renamed by MP government as Ashoknagar. Ashokanagar used to be a town of guna district. it became district in 2003.

== Demographics ==
Religion in Ashoknagar (2011)
Religion	Percent
Hindus	81.59%
Muslims	8.07%
Jains	9.65%
Sikhs	0.65%

The female-to-male ratio in Ashoknagar stands at 900 females per 1000 males compared to the 2001 census figure of 879 per 1000. The average national female-to-male ratio in India is 940 per 1000 as per latest reports of Census 2011 Directorate.

== Culture ==
The city lies in the Bundelkhand region and follows traditional Indian culture. Ashoknagar is famous for the Jain temple called Trikaal Choubeese, where the idols of past, present, and future Thirthankars, as described in the Jain religion, have been kept. The district is also famous for a small town called 'Chanderi', which is about 60 km from Ashoknagar. Chanderi was earlier, at the time of Mahabharata, known as "Chendi". Chendi Naresh Shishupal was its ruler, who was then killed by Lord Krishna In Chanderi, ancient sculptures have been discovered in large numbers. Thubonji Sidhdha Kshetra is another one of the pilgrim center for Jains. It is about 32 km from Ashoknagar. In the south, about 35 km from Ashoknagar, is the famous Karila Mata Mandir, which is known to be the birthplace of Luv and Kush, sons of Lord Rama and Sita Mata. A huge fair is organized every year on Rangpanchmi in which the Rai Dance is performed by the Bedni women. Tumen is also a famous historical pilgrim center situated at Triveni known for Mata Vindhyavasini temple. There are many more places of religious importance in the district of Ashoknagar.

Chanderi is a tehsil of the Ashoknagar district and is a famous historical & tourist palace. The main occupation of the people of Chanderi is handicraft. Chanderi sarees are famous all over the world. These are made by cotton and silk by hand through Khatka. Khatka is a self made machine for preparing sarees. Another famous place in Ashoknagar district is Sri Anandpur, the world headquarters of the Sri Advaith Paramhansa Sect. Disciples from across the globe visit Anandpur twice a year during Baisakhi and Guru Purnima to seek blessings from the gurus. Kadwaya, a small village in the district is also famous for the ancient Shiv Mandir, Garhi and Mata Mandir.

== Geography ==
Ashoknagar is situated at the average elevation of 507 metres(1640 ft) above sea level. It is in the plateau region and has an agricultural topography. The plateau is an extension of the Deccan Traps, formed between 60 and 68 million years ago at the end of the Cretaceous period. In this region, the main classes of soil are black, brown and bhatori (stony) soil. The volcanic, clay-like soil of the region owes its black colour to the high iron content of the basalt from which it is formed. The soil requires less irrigation because of its high capacity for moisture retention. The other two soil types are lighter and have a higher proportion of sand. The year is popularly divided into three seasons: summer, the rains, and winter. Summer extends over the months of Chaitra to Jyestha (mid-March to mid-May). The average daily temperature during the summer months is 35 °C, which typically rises to around 46 °C on a few days. The rainy season starts with the first showers of Aashaadha (mid-June) and extends to the middle of Ashvin (September). Most of the rain falls during the southwest monsoon spell, and ranges from about 100 cm in the west to about 165 cm in the east. Ashoknagar and surrounding areas receive an average of 140 cm of rainfall a year. The growing period lasts from 90 to 150 days, during which the average daily temperature is below 30 °C, but seldom falls below 20 °C. Winter is the longest of the three seasons, extending for about five months (mid-Ashvin to Phalgun, i.e., October to mid-March). The average daily temperature ranges from 15 °C to 20 °C, though on some nights it can fall as low as 5 °C. Some cultivators believe that an occasional winter shower during the months of Pausha and Maagha—known as Mawta—is helpful to the early summer wheat and germ crops.[5]

=== Climate ===
The climate of Ashoknagar is sub-tropical. In summers, the temperature reaches 47 °C, while dropping to 4 °C in the winter. Rainfall is adequate and sometimes less.

== Tumen Temple ==
TUMEN

There are a number of tourist spots in Ashoknagar Town, including: vindyvashni temple and many other temple here tumen

== Jain Temples ==
Ashoknagar district is one of the largest district on the basis of Jain population in India after Sagar, Tikamgarh, and Lalitpur. The Seven Super designed Jain Temples lie in the center of the Town. These are:

- Trikal Chaubisi – "Shanti Nagar"
- Gaon Ka mandir – Purana Bazar
- Shri Chandra prabhu Jain Mandir
- Subhash gunj Jain Mandir
- Swaadhyay Jain Mandir – Mahavir Colony
- Shri Parasnath Jain Temple- Soni Colony
- Shri Adinath Jain Mandir
- Shri Swetambar Jain Mandir, Bajariya Mohalla

== Other interesting places ==
- Tulsi Sarovar – Huge natural water lake. Boating at evening.
- Amai Dam
- Sankat Mochan

There are four Temples of lord Hanumana lies at all four Outskirts of the main city.

- Shri Taare Waale Balaji Temple in Aajad Mohalla
- Nehru Bal Udhyan
- Tulsi Sarovar Park

Along with the above-mentioned locations, there are many other tourist spots in the outskirts of Ashoknagar.

=== Chanderi ===
The Chanderi Fort is situated on a hill 71 meters above the town. The fortified walls were constructed mainly by the Muslim rulers of Chanderi. The main entrance to the fort is through a series of three gates, the uppermost of which is known as Hawa Paur and the lowermost is called the Khuni Darwaja, or the gate of blood. The peculiar name is derived from the fact that criminals were executed at this point by hurling them from the battlements above, breaking their bodies into pieces to the ground. Within the fort there are only two ruined buildings: the Hawa and Nau-Khanda Mahals built by Bundela Chiefs. A rest house on the northern ridge provides a view of the town below by the countryside.

=== Chanderi Fort ===
To the southwest of Fort there is a curious gateway called katti-ghatti built through the hillside. It is 59 meters long, 12 meters broad and 24.6 meters high. In its center, the rock has been sculpted into the shape of a gate, with a pointed arch, and flanked by sloping towers.

=== Kaushak Mahal ===
The Kaushak Mahal of Chanderi is also known as Tawarikh-i-Ferishta. According to history, in 1445 AD Mehmood Shah Khilji of Malwa was passing through Chanderi, when he ordered a seven-storied palace to be built there, which came to be Kaushak Mahal. It is an imposing building of some grandeur, though standing in a half-ruined condition. To the south, east and north of the Kaushak Mahal, well maintained palaces of Ramnagar, Panchamnagar and Singhpur are situated respectively. All were built by Bundela chiefs of Chanderi in the 18th century.

=== Shri Anandpur ===
Shri Anandpur is a religious place, which is the part of Issagarh Tehsil, about 30 km from the district center of Ashoknagar. The institution is influenced by "Advait Mat". The founder of this institution was Shri Advait Anand Ji. He is also known as Maharaj Shri Paramhans Dayal Ji. The place is surrounded with greenery. The Ashram is situated near Vindhyachal Mountain range and is the center of attraction for its glorious architecture and pollution free environment. The development of Anandpur started away back in 1939 and continued till 1964. The institution was established as " Shri Anandpur Trust" on 22 April 1954 and this trust is running a charity hospital which is a main attraction point for the locals where they can get good medical facility free. Most of its development took place during Shri Padshahi Ji Maharaj IV & Shri Padshahi Ji Maharaj V. Shri Anand Shanti Bhavan is the main part of the sacred place, is constructed with pure white marble. The pillar can be seen from a long distance away from the building. The Satsang Bhavan is a huge place of Shri Anandpur. It is the centre of attraction for the devotees. In Shri Anandpur the facilities of Hospital, School, Post Office etc. are present too.

=== Kadwaya ===
Kadwaya a small village of ISAGARH tehsil of district ashoknagar having number of temples. One of these temples has been constructed in the 10th century in Kachhapaghata style of architecture. It has garbha-griha (sanctum), antaral and mandapa. Another old temple of Kadwaya is known as Chandal math. As per history, it was built to house Matta Mourya, members of Shaiva sect. During Akbar's reign Kadwaya was the headquarters of Gwalior's sarkar. Kadwaya is alSo the birthplace of pandit late ramvali sharma who served till death for the socio, political and economic development of the village. Besides this KADWAYA GADI(buried fort) is the site of world heritage. it is also famous for mata BIJASEN TEMPLE. it is said that one cures there defected eyes, by her blessings. total population of kadwaya is approx. 3000.

=== Thubonji Sidhdha Kshetra ===
In Thubonji Sidhdha Kshetra, there are a group of 26 temples imparting the message of peace, nonviolence & non-affection ness to pilgrims. This sacred place Thuvonji came to knowledge during the period of famous businessman Padashah. It is believed that when Padashah put his metal Tin here, it got converted into Silver. Temple No. 15 is the main among them known as big temple, with 28 feet high miraculous colossus of Lord Adinath in standing posture, installed by Vikram Samvat in 1672.

Atishay – It is said that sound of various musical instruments is heard at the night as the gods from heaven come here for prayers & worships. It is also said that after the completion of this high colossus, initially devotees were unable to install it in the standing posture. At that night, Head of the Construction saw a dream that worshipping the colossus will only allow it to be installed in the standing posture, accordingly in the next morning colossus was worshipped and then Head of the Construction alone was able to place the high colossus in standing posture. The public present at that time saw this miracle with wonder.

There are number of Jain temples are also present in the Kshetra :

- Lord parsvanath Jain Temple – There is a magnificent 15 feet high colossus of Lord Parsvanath (23rd Teerthankar) installed in V.S. 1864. The colossus have a very artistic serpent hood over the head as well as in both the sides of the colossus.
- Lord Shantinath Jain temple – 18 feet high standing posture of Lord Shantinath (16th Teerthankar) is the principal deity in the temple.
- Ajitnath Jain Temple – Principal deity is the Lord Ajitnath(2nd Teerthankar).
- Adinath Jain Temple – It is also a magnificent and vast temple having 16 feet high colossus of Lord Adinath. This was installed by Savasingh of Chanderi in V.S. 1873. He also completed the famous Choubeesee Mandir of Chanderi
- Chandraprabhu Jain Temple – Lord Chandraprabhu (8th Teerthankar) is the principal deity in the temple, 1.5 feet sitting(Padmasana) statue of the Lord is the idol in the temple.

Other temples are also worth being seen.

Museum – Some ancient idols are kept there, among them a standing 12 feet high idol.

== Employment ==
In Ashoknagar, the occupation of the people is mostly agricultural. People are associated with grain merchandising. Textiles business is also very active. In recent times, Commodity Exchange Market has also grown along with logistic business. Ashoknagar is famous for its market which includes textiles, automobiles, utensils, cement works, groceries, gold and ornaments and almost all other things. It is a business hub, people from all around the division come over here for the trade.

== Transport ==
Ashoknagar has road and rail connections to the main cities of the state and nation. Ashoknagar railway station is the part of Kota-Bina railway section of West Central Railway. The nearest airports to Ashoknagar are Bhopal Airport and Gwalior Airport.

The roads inside the city are however quite wide, but are not in good paved condition. Thus, during rainy seasons there is a chance of lot of accidents occurring. A major issue is of the dust on the city's roads, it is such that there is a great chance of spreading diseases like severe cough and a lot more dust causing diseases.

Ashoknagar is situated on the state highway 20 (SH 20) with local connections to Guna, SH 10 to Vidisha and Shivpuri and connections on to Indore, Bhopal and Gwalior. SH 20 as GUNA-ISHAGARH road towards north, is about 3 km inside the city, while SH 19 is about a single km at thobon/Chanderii road. Rather than this, There are some shorter city roads are also has links to nearer villages and towns, such as Pachaadi Kheda Road, Mohri road, Aron road, Kolua road, Pawargarh road, Kabira road etc.

Ashoknagar is 44 km from the NH-3 Agra Bombay highway and one hour drive away from the NH-76.
