= Ashoknagar railway station =

Railway station in Madhya Pradesh

Ashoknagar

General information
- Location: Officer Colony Road, Ashoknagar, Madhya Pradesh; India
- Coordinates: 24.5793°N 77.7279°E
- Elevation: 502 metres (1,647 ft)
- System: Indian Railway station
- Owner: Indian Railways
- Operator: West Central Railway
- Line: Kota–Bina line
- Platforms: 3
- Tracks: 4
- Connections: Auto stand

Construction
- Structure type: Standard (on-ground station)
- Parking: Yes
- Cycle facilities: No

Other information
- Status: Functioning
- Station code: ASKN
- Zone(s): West Central Railway
- Division(s): Bhopal
Location
- Location within Madhya Pradesh Location within India

Ashoknagar railway station is a small railway station in Ashoknagar district, Madhya Pradesh. Its code is ASKN. It serves Ashoknagar city. The station consists of 3 platforms. The platforms are not well sheltered. It lacks many facilities including water and sanitation. Ashoknagar is the part of Kota–Bina railway section of West Central Railway.

== Major trains ==
- Dayodaya Express
- Bhopal–Gwalior Intercity Express
- Sabarmati Express
- Ujjaini Express
- Jabalpur–Indore Intercity Express
- Gorakhpur–Okha Express
- Durg–Jaipur Weekly Express
- Gwalior - SMVT Bengaluru Express
