= Tyumen (disambiguation) =

Tyumen is a city in Russia.

Tyumen may also refer to:

- Tyumen Oblast, a federal subject of Russia
- Tyumen Urban Okrug, a municipal formation which the City of Tyumen in Tyumen Oblast, Russia is incorporated as
- Tyumen (inhabited locality), several inhabited localities in Russia
- FC Tyumen, an association football club based in Tyumen, Russia
- MFK Tyumen, a futsal club based in Tyumen, Russia

== See also ==
- Tumen (disambiguation)
- Tyumensky (disambiguation)
