= Rājmatī stepwell =

Singhpur stepwell
- Stepwell
- Possible location in present-day Madhya Pradesh, India Singhpur stepwell (Madhya Pradesh)
- Coordinates: 24.58°N 78.10°E
- Country: India
- State: Madhya Pradesh
- District: Ashoknagar
- Elevation: 300 m (980 ft)

Languages
  - Official: Hindi
- Time zone: UTC+5:30 (IST)

The Rājmatī stepwell (24°41'10.7095"N, 78°06'26.4485"E) is a water management structure dating to the end of the 1400s. It is located a short distance north of Singhpur village near Chanderi in Ashoknagar district, Madhya Pradesh, India. The stepwell was built by Rājamatī who is named in the inscription inserted in one of the walls of the structure.

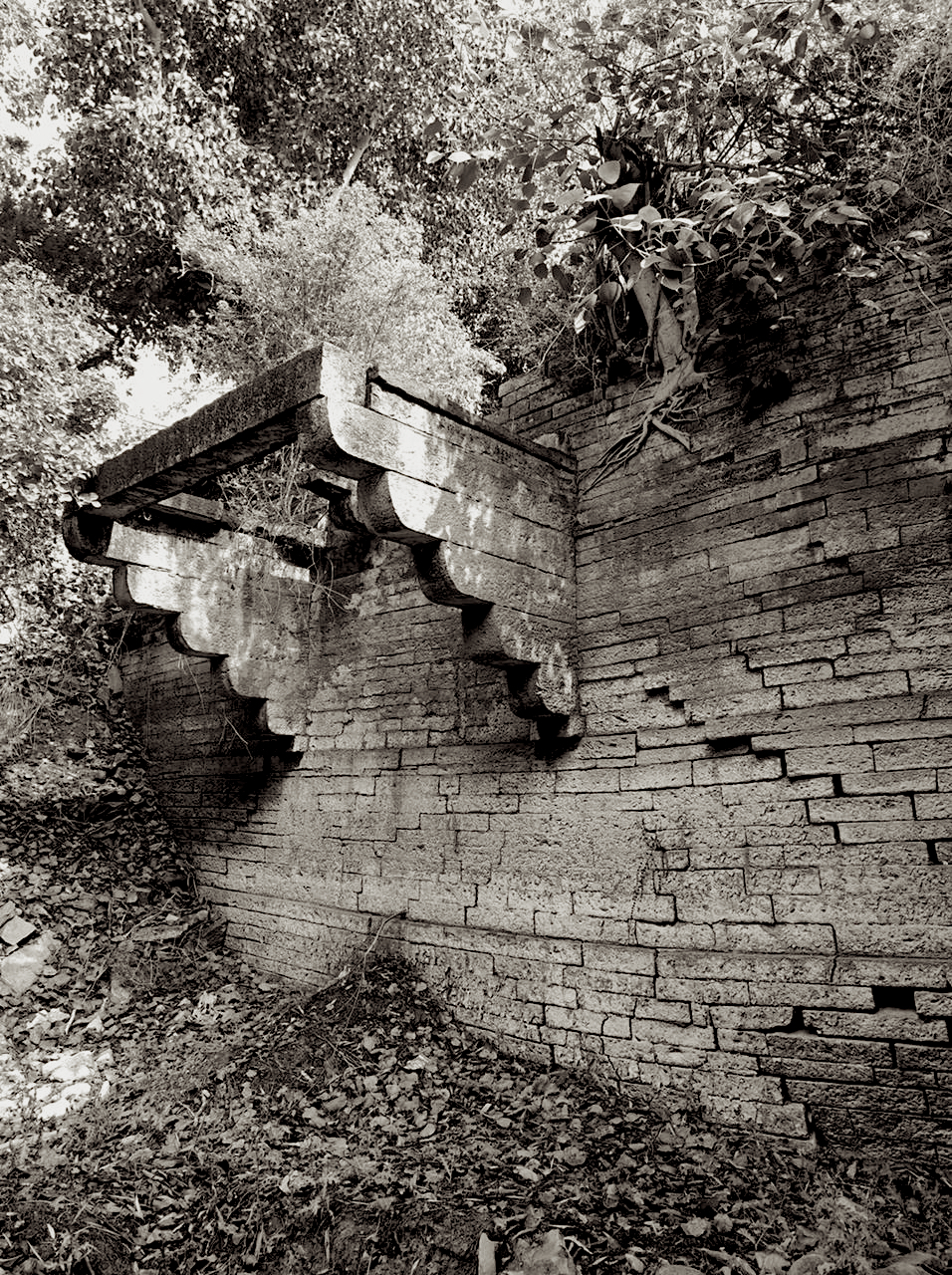
Rājmatī stepwell, interior, dated by inscription to VS 1535/1479 CE.

The inscription, composed in a mixture of Sanskrit and old Hindi, presents an unusual biography of Rājamatī, the patron. She is said by the text to have received gifts from the Sultans of the seven leading kingdoms of the time, and built the water facility for travellers as an honourable act of public piety (dānadharma).
