= Kadwaya =

Village in Madhya Pradesh, India

Kadwaya Kadwaha
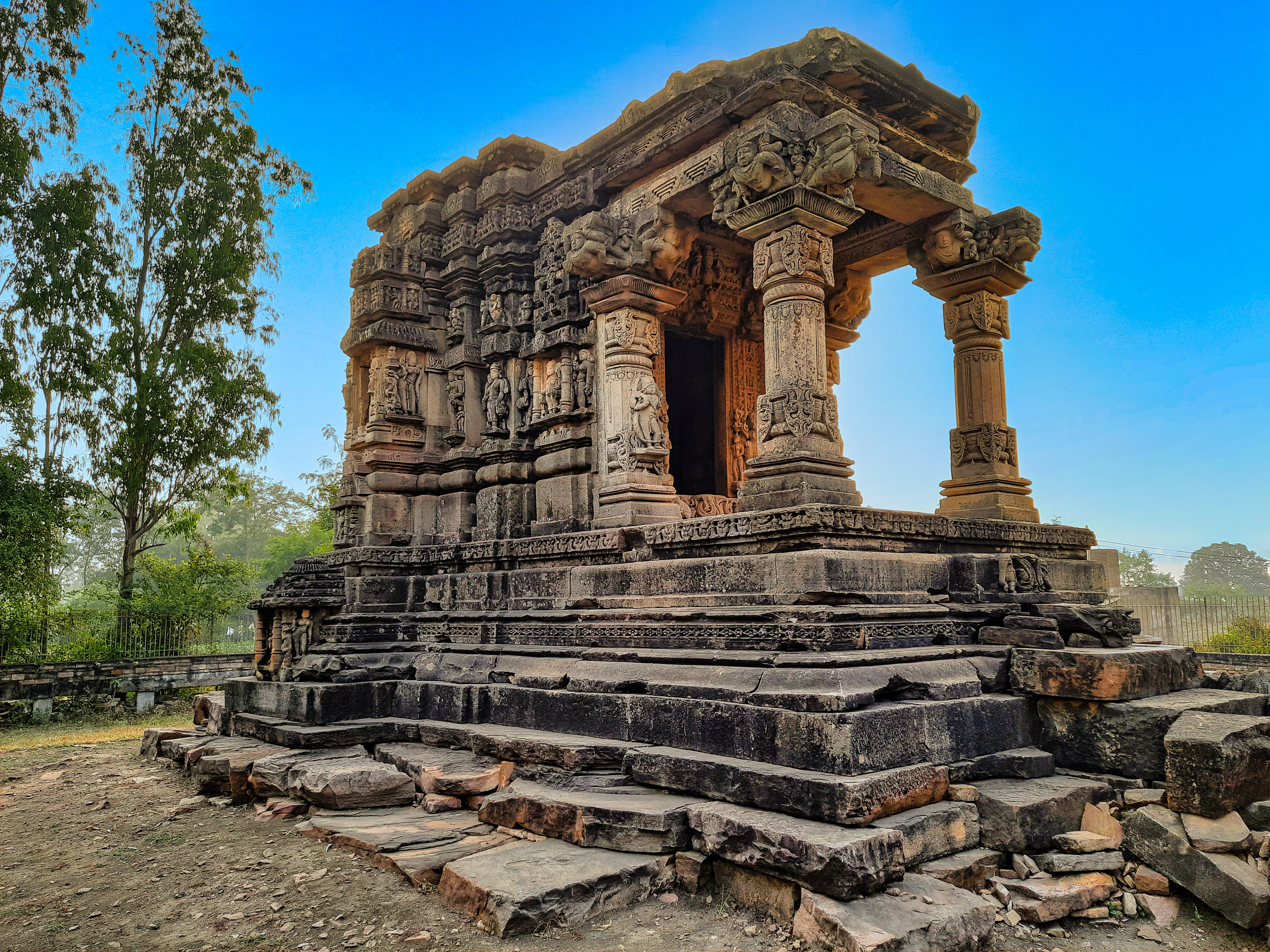
- Temple of Vishnu, 10th century, part of the Pachhali Marghat complex

- Location in Madhya Pradesh, India
- Coordinates: 24°57′47″N 77°54′55″E
- Country: India
- State: Madhya Pradesh
- District: Ashoknagar

Population (2011)
  - Total: 4,572

Languages
- Time zone: UTC+5:30 (IST)

Kadwaya (Kadwāyā), also called Kadwaha (Kadwāhā), is a village in Madhya Pradesh, India. It is located in the Isagarh Tehsil in the Ashoknagar district. The village has a number of temples. The population in 2011 was 4,572.

== Name ==
Kadwaya has been identified with the medieval settlement of Kadambaguhā, mentioned in an inscription dated to c. 1000, although V. V. Mirashi disputed this identification. Kadambaguhā may or may not be the same place as the Kadambapadraka mentioned in an early 12th-century inscription. Kadwaya also may be identical to the place called Mattamayūra, which was the main centre of the Mattamayūra sect during this period. The name of the village today is variously spelled as "Kadwāhā" or "Kadwāyā", with "Kadwāyā" being a local variant of "Kadwāhā".

== Geography ==
Kadwaya is located between the upper reaches of the Mahuar and Ahiravati rivers, two tributaries of the Sindh River flowing north-south. It is roughly parallel with a westward bend in the Betwa River to the east.

== History ==
Kadwaya underwent a major development between the 9th and 11th centuries, growing "from a humble settlement into a monumental temple town that contained no fewer than fifteen temples, a monastery, and a range of wells, gardens, and water tanks." The town essentially grew up around the Mattamayūra monastery, known as the Chaṇḍāla Maṭh, which is dated to the 9th century and is the oldest surviving structure at Kadwaya. Assuming the identification with Kadambaguhā is correct, then Kadwaya would be the original home of the Mattamayūras — the earliest known Mattamayūra āchārya was known as Kadambaguhādhivāsin, which literally means "the inhabitant of Kadambaguhā", and a contemporary inscription calls it "the venerable abode of the line of siddhas".

Besides its importance to the Mattamayūras, Kadwaya's growth likely owed much to its geographical location. It was between Narwar and Chanderi on a major route connecting the Narmada valley in the south with the Yamuna plain in the north. This route followed the paths of several rivers, and Kadwaya's location – on the upper tributaries of the Sindh, but near a westward bend in the Betwa – probably made it an attractive transition point where travellers could cross from one basin to the other.

Medieval Kadwaya was located in the southern part of a region known as Gopakṣetra, between Jejākabhukti (modern Bundelkhand) to the east, Dāśārṇa to the south, and Mālavā to the west. It was likely part of a fairly remote region, far from the major political centres and probably home to various itinerant groups such as autonomous tribal groups (known as āṭavikas at the time) ascetics, and merchants. Kadwaya was probably ruled by a local branch of the Pratihara dynasty based at nearby Budhi Chanderi ("Old Chanderi"), who are known to have patronized the monastery (maṭha) at Kadwaya.

A temple adjoining the Chaṇḍāla Maṭh was probably built during the early 900s, and most of the other temples were probably also built during the 900s. The exceptions are the Toteshvara Mahādeva and the Mārgatvāla, which were probably built in the 1000s. Of the 15 medieval temples in Kadwaya, 10 were dedicated to Shiva and 5 to Vishnu. Sometime around the 1200s, a fortress (gaḍhī) was built around the central monastery-temple complex. In the 1300s, it was probably converted into a Muslim ribaṭ (frontier outpost), and a mosque was also built. (Note: Although textual sources do not explicitly identify Kadwaya as a Muslim ribaṭ (frontier outpost), Sears considers it likely based on archaeological evidence that it was one.)

Kadwaya is likely the "Kajarrā" or "Kajwarā" visited by Ibn Battuta in the 1340s. Although this place is commonly identified with Khajuraho, Tamara Sears argues that Khajuraho was neither particularly important at the time nor anywhere near Ibn Battuta's likely route, so according to her Kadwaya is a more likely identification. Kadwaya can likely also be identified with the "Kachwa" or "Kachwaha" mentioned in the Baburnama as Babur's last major stop before conquering Chanderi in 1527-28.

== The village today ==
Although Kadwaya today is a rather out-of-the-way village, it "remains the nexus of the surrounding area": its modern temple to Bījāsan Devī (Note: Bījāsan Devī is a regionally important goddess worshipped in central India, especially north of the Narmada; her temple at Kadwaya probably dates from the late 1700s or early 1800s.) hosts a festival every other week, which attracts "crowds of villagers and merchants to worship and exchange goods". The old monastery-turned-fort still forms the centre of the village, with fragments of the medieval town's walls still visible, and the various outlying medieval temples roughly mark the village boundaries on the north, east, and west.
