= Chanderi fort =

Fort in India

Coordinates: 24°43′12″N 78°07′48″E

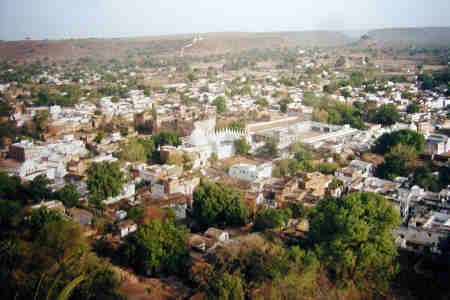
View of Chanderi town from Qila Kothi

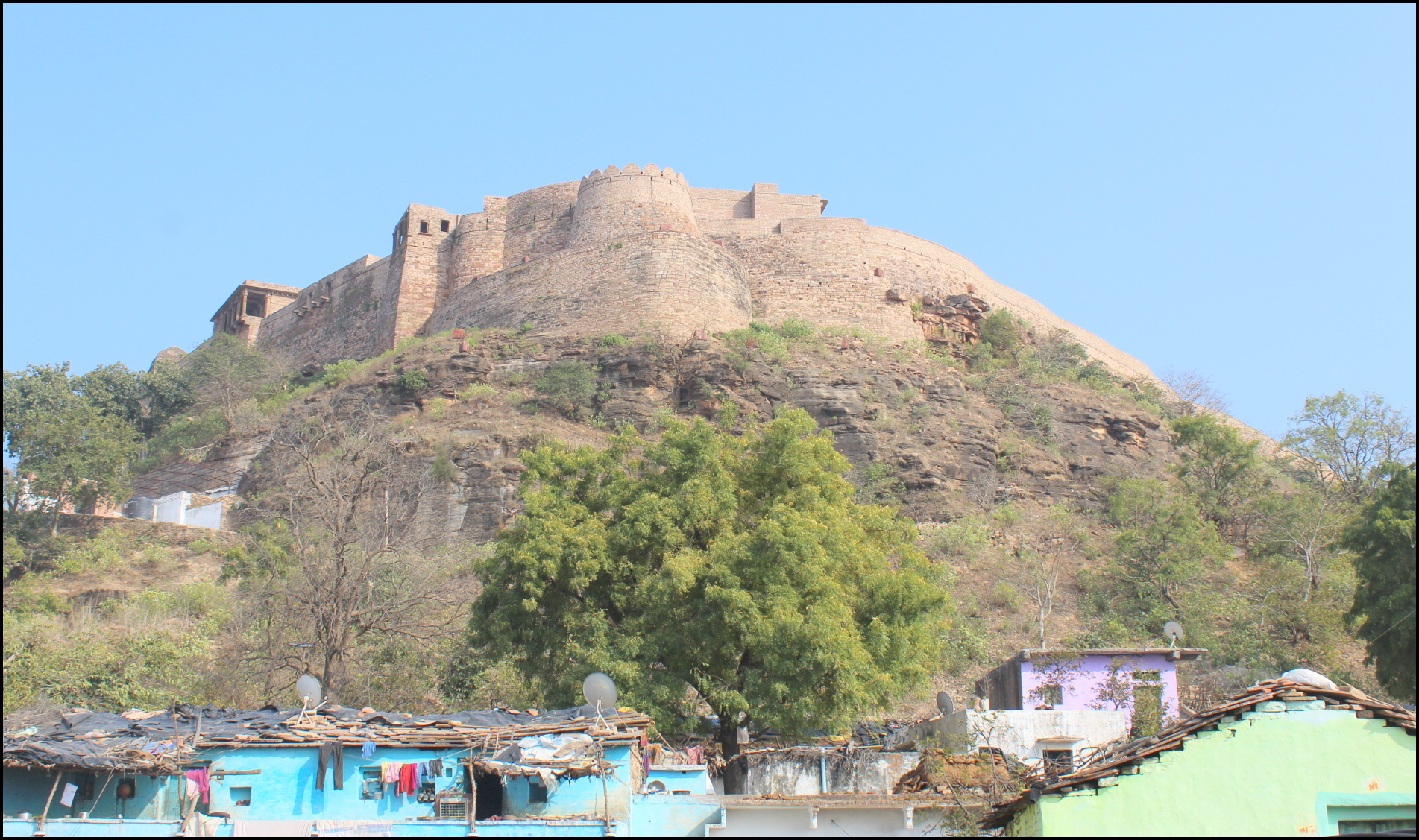
A view of Chanderi Fort

Chanderi Fort located at Chanderi in Ashoknagar District of Madhya Pradesh state in India is situated at a distance of 127 km from Shivpuri and 37 km from Lalitpur and about 45 km from Esagarh and 38 km from Mungoali It is located on a hill southwest of the Betwa River. Chanderi is surrounded by hills, lakes and forests and there are several monuments. Chanderi finds mention in Mahabharata. Shishupal was the king of Mahabharata period.

Chanderi is located strategically on the borders of Malwa and Bundelkhand. History of Chanderi goes back to the 11th century, when it was dominated by the trade routes of Central India and was proximate to the arterial route to the ancient ports of Gujarat as well as to Malwa, Mewar, Central India and the Deccan. Consequently, Chanderi became an important military outpost.

Chanderi Fort, a vast Rajput fort, dominates the skyline of the lovely old town of Chanderi. The main gate of the fort is known as the "Khooni Darwaza". Chanderi fort is situated on a hill 71 meter above the town. The fortification walls were constructed mainly by the Hindu rulers of Chanderi. To the southwest of the fort there is a curious gateway called katti-ghatti made through a hill side.

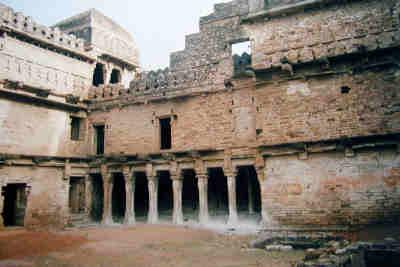
A courtyard inside the fort

== History ==
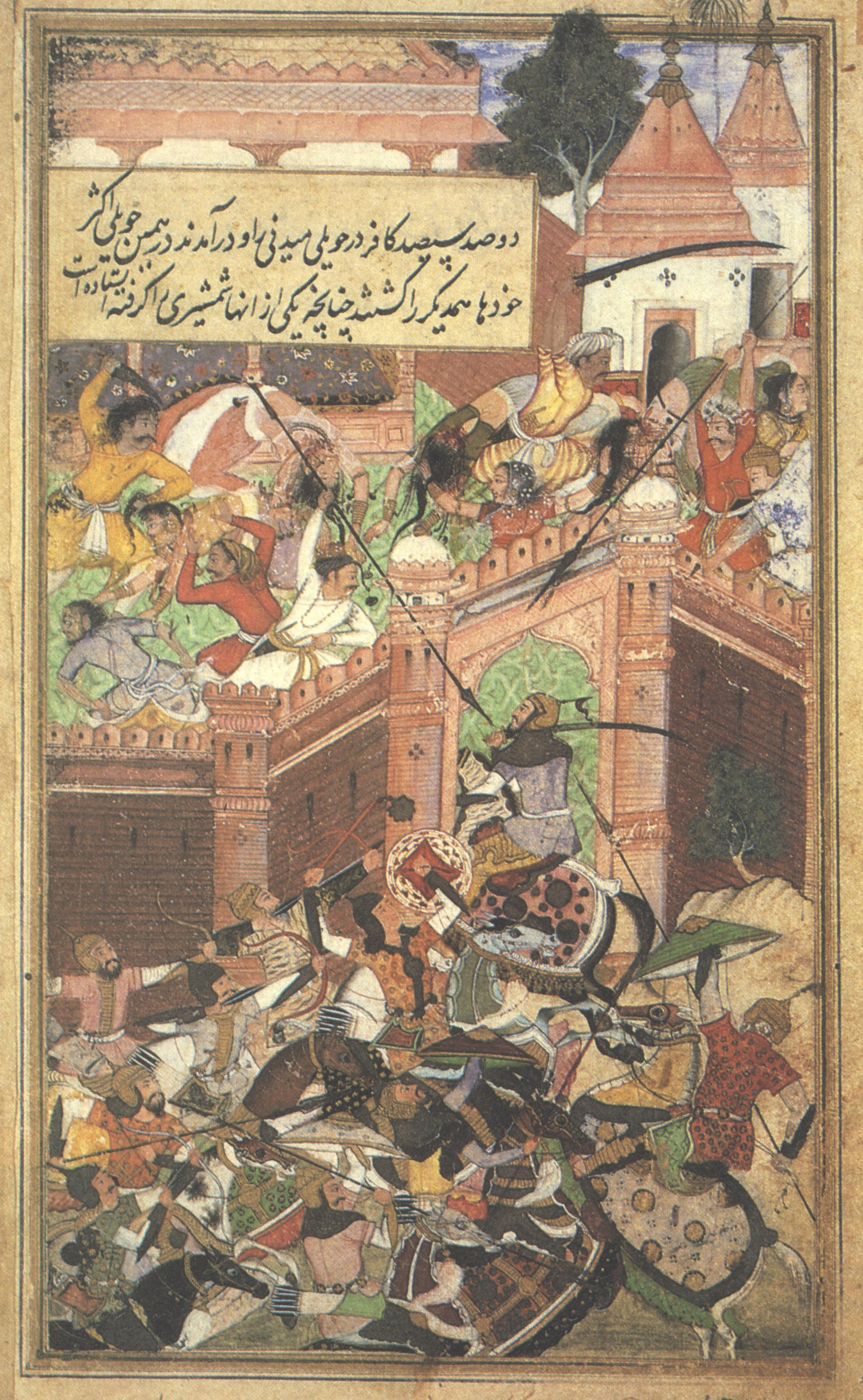
The Mughal Army of Babur capture Chanderi fort.

Chanderi is mentioned by the Persian scholar Alberuni in 1030. Ghiyas ud din Balban captured the city in 1251 for Nasiruddin Mahmud, Sultan of Delhi. Sultan Mahmud Khilji of Malwa captured the city In 1438 after a siege of several months. In 1520 Rana Sangha of Mewar captured the city, and gave it to Medini Rai, a rebellious minister of Sultan Mahmud II of Malwa. The Mughal Emperor Babur captured the city from Medini Rai, In 1529 Raja Puran Mal defeated Babur's forces and captured the city. He ruled on chanderi for 11 years, and in 1540 it was captured by Sher Shah Suri, and added to the governorship of Shujaat Khan. The Mughal Emperor Akbar made the city a sarkar in the subah of Malwa. The Bundela Rajputs captured the city in 1586, and it was held by Ram Sab, a son of Raja Madhukar of Orchha. In 1680 Devi Singh Bundela was made governor of the city with his commander in chief and prime minister of chanderi state Maharaja Chaubey Bhim singh, and Chanderi remained in the hands of his family until it was annexed in 1811 by Jean Baptiste Filose for the Maratha ruler Daulat Rao Sindhia of Gwalior. The city was transferred to the British in 1844. The British lost control of the city during the Revolt of 1857, and the city was recaptured by Sir Hugh Rose on February 14, 1858. Richard Harte Keatinge was awarded the Victoria Cross for leading this assault. The city was transferred back to the Sindhias of Gwalior in 1861, and became part of Isagarh District of Gwalior state. After India's independence in 1947, Gwalior became part of the new state of Madhya Bharat, which was merged into Madhya Pradesh on November 1, 1956.
