= Piprai =

Town in Madhya Pradesh, India

- Town
- Location in Madhya Pradesh, India
- Coordinates: 24.51°N 77.96°E
- Country: India
- State: Madhya Pradesh
- District: Ashoknagar
- Elevation: 608 m (1,995 ft)

Population (2011)
  - Total: 9,037

Languages
  - Official: Hindi
- Time zone: UTC+5:30 (IST)
- Postal code: 473335
- ISO 3166 code: IN-MP
- Vehicle registration: MP-67

Piprai is a town and Nagar Panchayat in Ashoknagar District of Madhya Pradesh in India. It is also a Tehsil

== Geography ==
Piprai town is located on 24.51°N 77.96°E. It has an average elevation of 358 metres (1174 feet). Multiple villages surround the city. The region is predominantly agrarian.

== Demographics ==
The Piprai Town population of 9037 of which 4734 are males while 4303 are females as of the 2011 census. A total 1664 families reside there.

== Transportation ==
Piprai's Railway Station is located on Kota Bina Line, which connects it Gwalior, Sagar, Bina, Kota Junction, Ratlam Junction, Guna, Bhopal, and Jabalpur Junction.

A Major Road Connects it from Ashoknagar, Mungaoli and Chanderi.

== See also ==
- Ashoknagar District
