= Tumen =

Tumen may refer to one of the following.

== Places ==
- Tumen River, a river in China, North Korea, and Russia
- Tumen, Jilin, a city in China
- Tumen, Madhya Pradesh, a village in India

== People ==
- Tumen, Bumin Khan, Turkic Khagan
- Tümen Jasagtu Khan, a Khagan of Mongolia in the late 16th century
- Tumen Dashtseveg, head of the Department of Anthropology & Archaeology at the National University of Mongolia

== Others ==
- Tumen (unit), a Turkic and Mongol military unit of 10,000 people

== See also ==
- Tuman (disambiguation)
- Tyumen (disambiguation)
