= Vikatgad =

Fort in Maharashtra, India

Vikatgad Fort
- Part of Matheran Hill Range
- Raigad district, Maharashtra
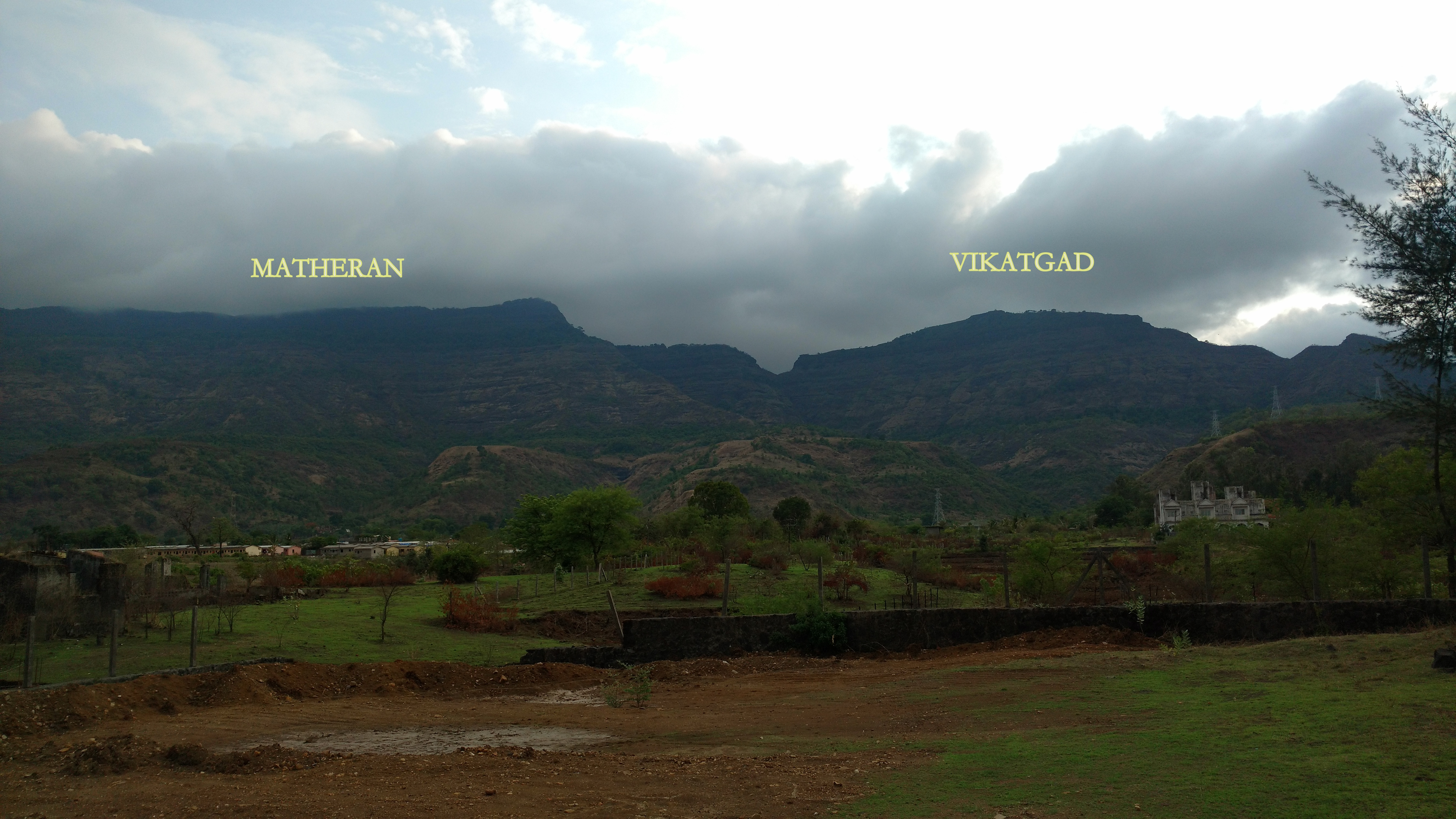
- Vikatgad fort in Neral

Site information
- Type: Hill fort
- Owner: Government of India
- Open to the public: Yes
- Condition: Ruins

Location
- Shown within Maharashtra
- Location within Maharashtra
- Coordinates: 19°01′43.3″N 73°16′44.6″E
- Height: 2100 Ft.

Site history
- In use: Surveyllance
- Materials: Stone

Vikatgad , also known as Peb Fort, is a fort located 19 km (12 mi) from Karjat, in Raigad district, of Maharashtra. This fort is in continuation with the Malang gad, Tauli Hill and Chanderi fort of the Matheran Hill Range. Vikatgad is a favourite destination for one-day trekkers. The trek path to Vikatgad is along deep ravines and cliffs. Its closeness to Matheran and Neral attracts many trekkers on weekends. The forest department and local villagers are doing plantation and some restoration works on the fort. The altitude of Vikatgad is 640 meters (2100 feet) above sea level.

== History ==
Very less history about this fort is available. It has store rooms for storing food grains and ammunition, and was visited by Captain Dickinson in 1818.

== How to reach ==
This fort can be reached from Panvel and Neral towns. The nearest town is Matheran which is 8 km (5.0 mi) from Neral. The Neral is well connected by rail and road. It is a busy station on the Mumbai-Pune railway line. There are good hotels in Matheran and Neral. Tea and snacks are also available in small hotels on the way to Matheran. There are many routes to reach the fort. The easiest is to reach Matheran by bus/car/train and start walking along the railway track. The route is very narrow. There are few trees on the trekking route. It takes about an hour to reach the entrance stairs of the fort. The night stay on the fort can be made in the Datta temple on the fort. The other path is from the Kadya Ganpati idol. A scary walk along the lonely path is followed to reach the col on the north, then follow the trek path on the other side of the hill to reach the Peb fort. The other two routes are very difficult. The path becomes slippery during monsoon and may lead to These trek routes start from the base village Mamadapur and Fanaswadi. It requires three hours to reach the fort from the base villages. A path which leads to the col on the north of the fort is to be approached with high endurance. The trek path along the electric towers leads to the col. After reaching the col, the path over the southern narrow ridge should be followed to reach the Vikatgad fort scarp. There are three five-foot high rock patches to be negotiated to reach the entrance gate. The path moves along the western side of the scarp. A nice cave temple is on the way. There is water available in the rock-cut cisterns. There are some narrow caves dug along the scarp. The caves are very narrow so that only one person can enter inside at a time. One of the cave is 20–30 feet long with a small iron ladder to climb down. It is very humid and dark in the cave. This fort can be visited in all seasons, however, it is very windy and cloudy in the rainy season.

== Places to see ==
There are two gates on the entrance path of the fort, however, only ruins of the gates can be seen. There are water cistern and ruins of the buildings on the fort. The top of the fort is very narrow and a recently built temple with Lord Datta's paduka idol at the center is constructed. There is a lone residential hut or Datta temple on the southern side of the fort. There is a lone bastion on the southern ridge of the fort. The water is available in a small cistern round the year for drinking purpose located on the eastern ridge. There is an idol of Hanuman on the fort. The ground on the fort is very irregular and hilly. It takes about an hour to visit all places on the fort.

== Gallery ==
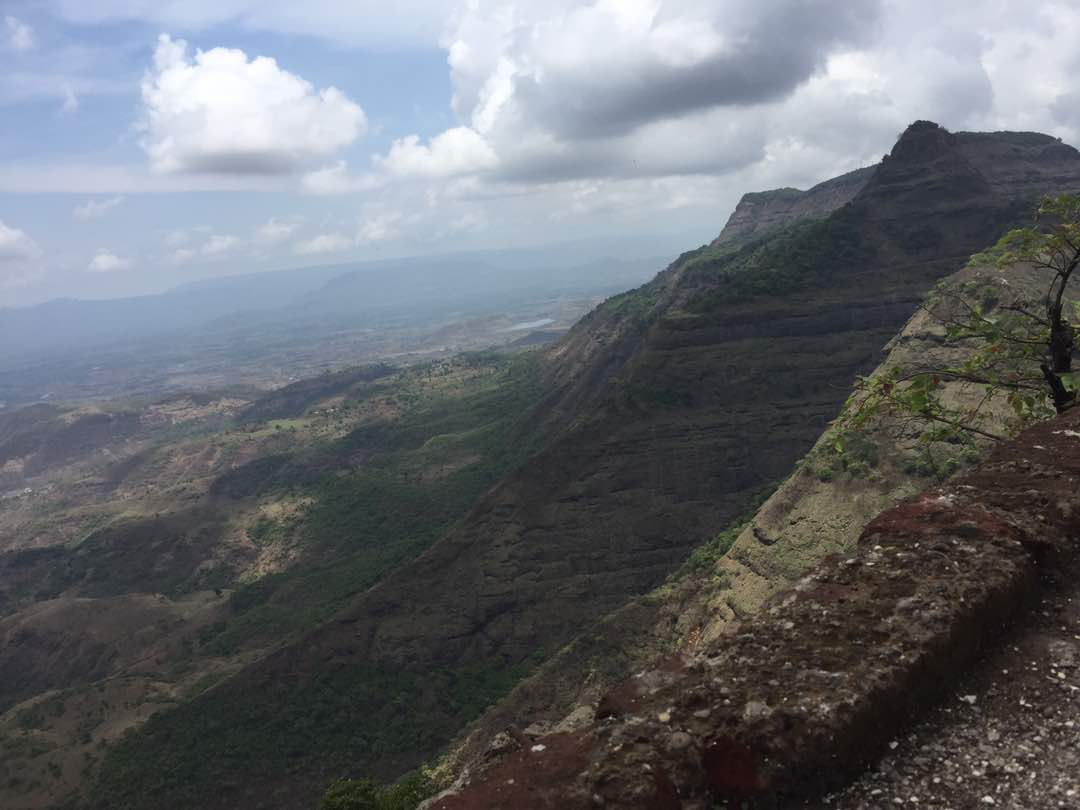
Steep hills around the Fort

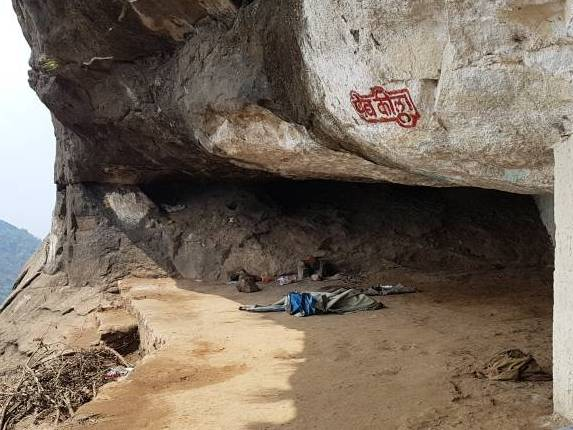
The cave

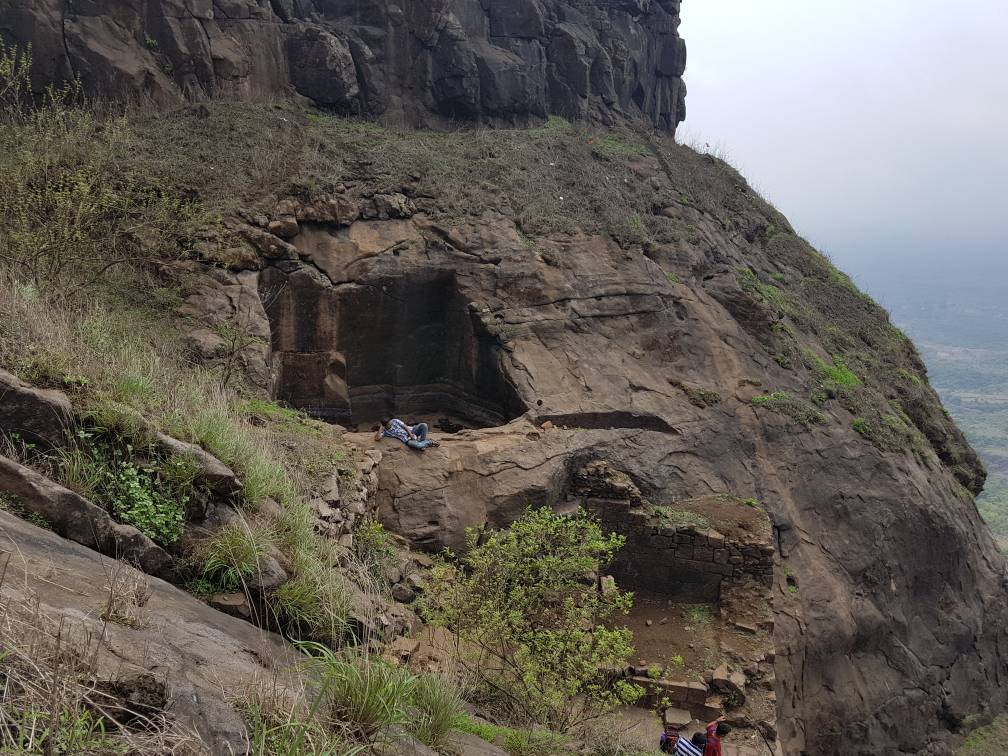
Rock cut water cistern

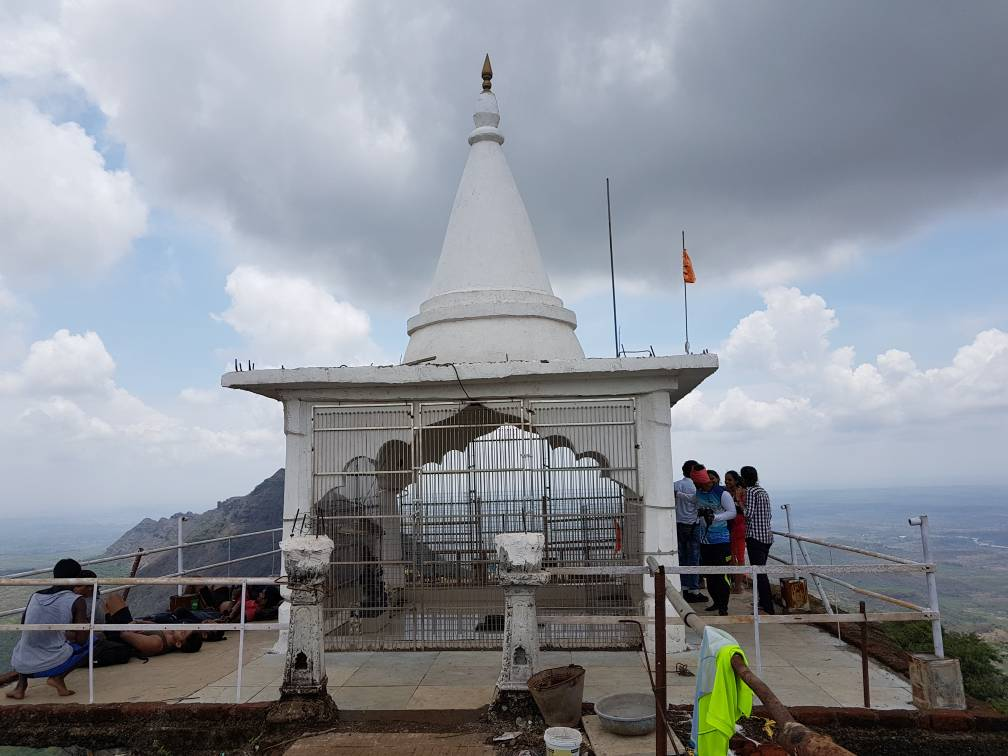
The temple at the top

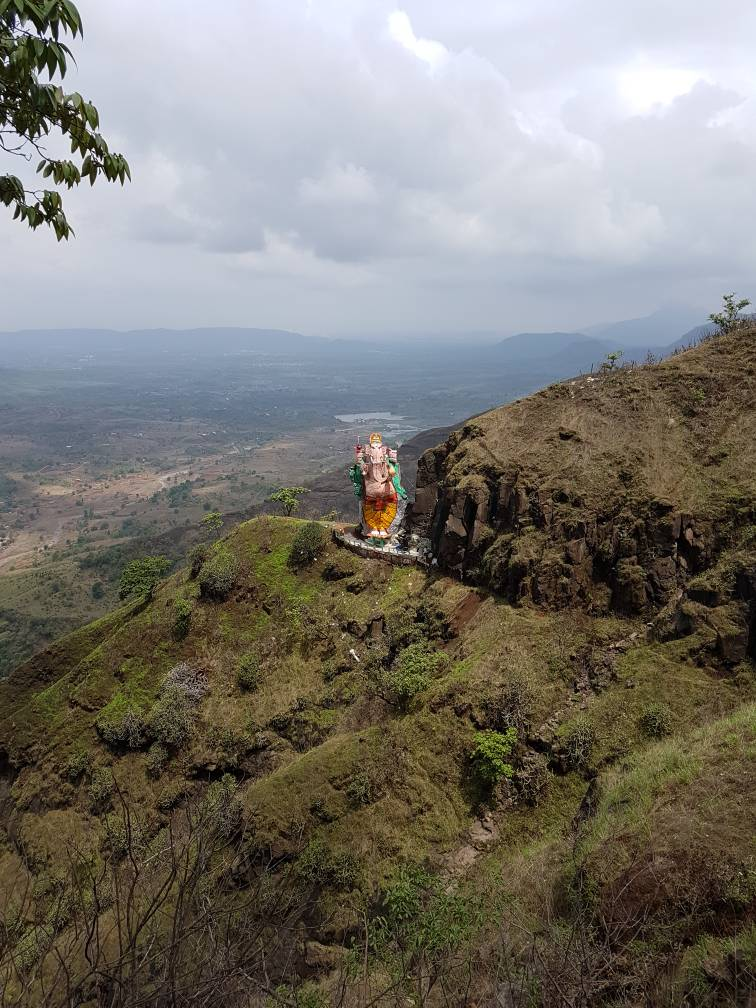
Kadya Varcha Ganapati idol

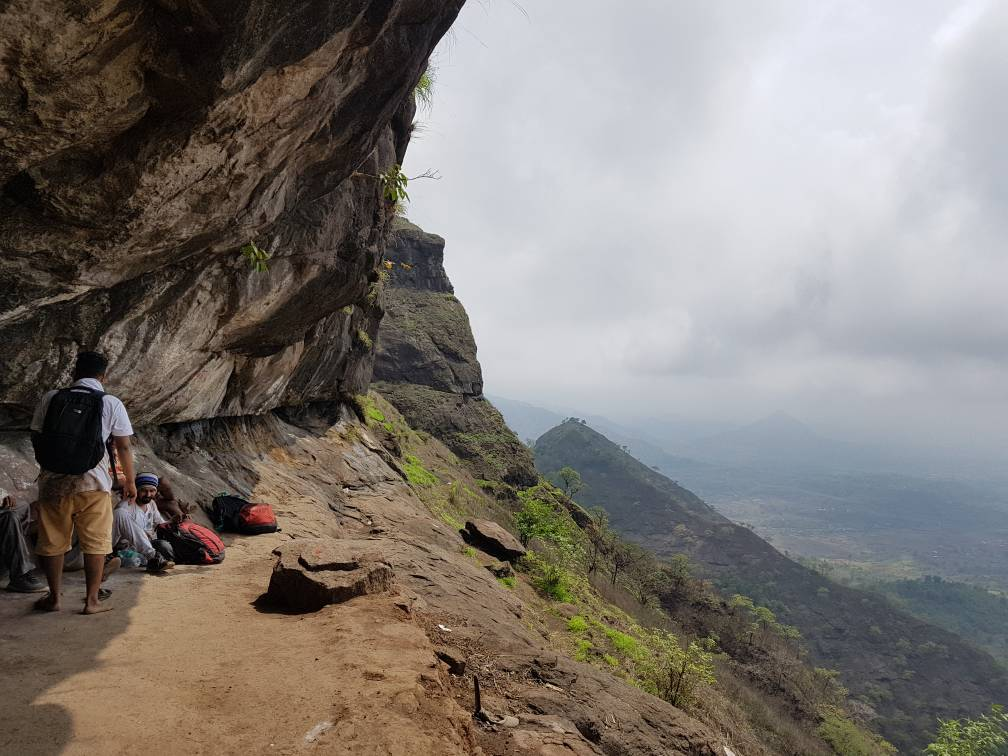
Way to the fort

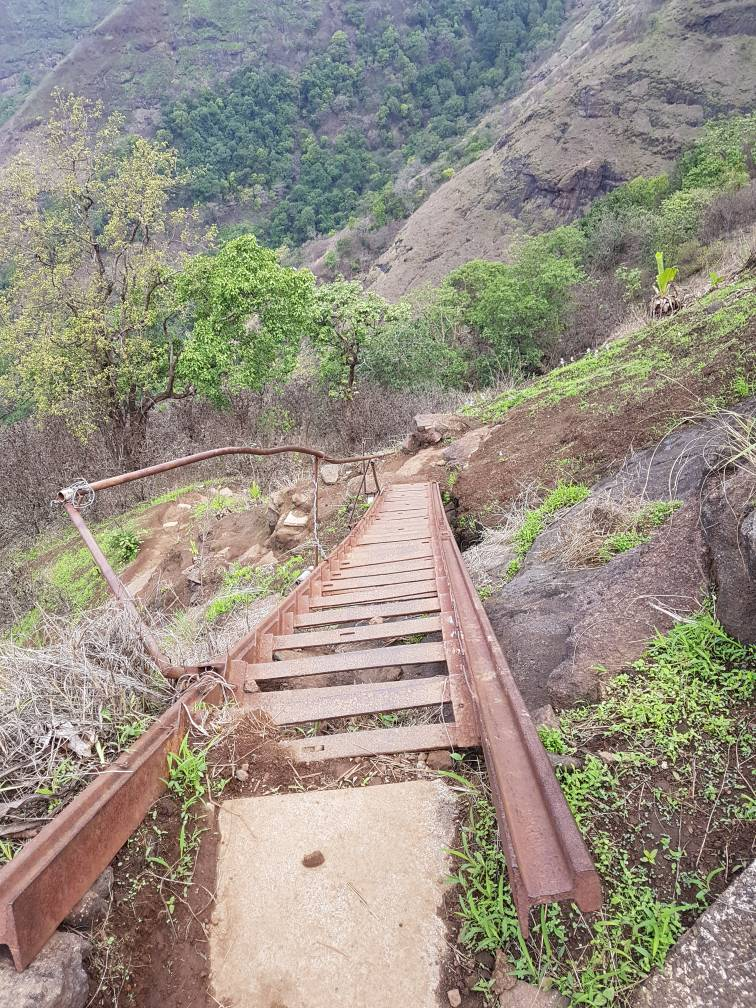
The ladder on the way to fort

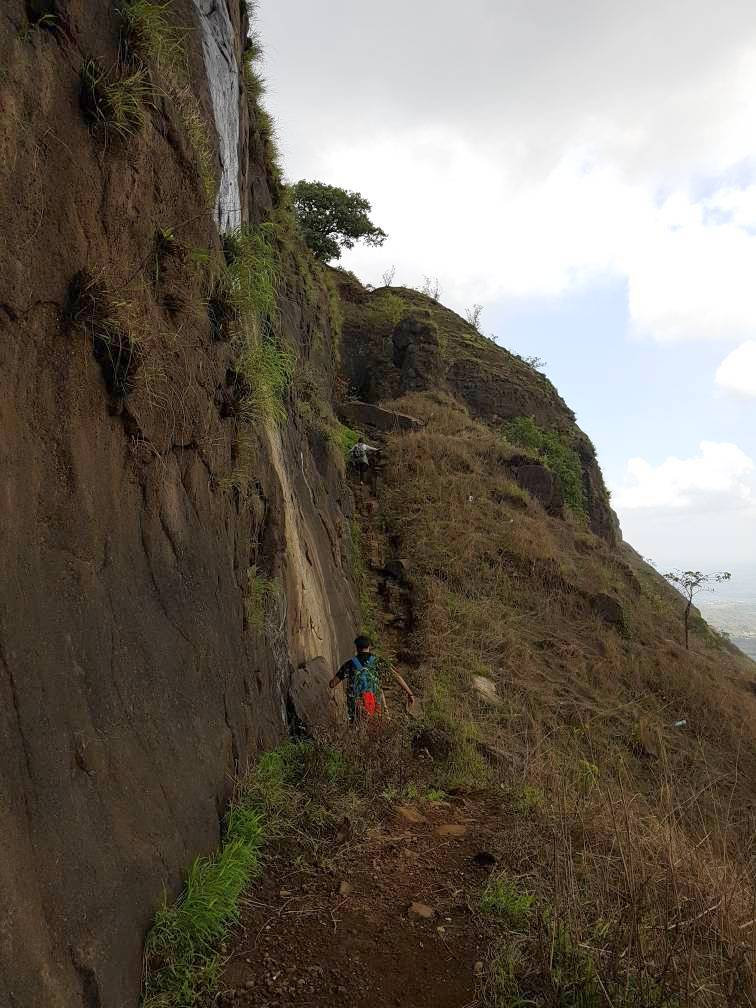
The path along the scarp

== See also ==
- List of forts in Maharashtra
- List of forts in India
- Marathi People
- List of Maratha dynasties and states
- Maratha War of Independence
- Battles involving the Maratha Empire
- Maratha Army
- Maratha titles
- Military history of India
