= Isagarh District =

Isagarh District is a former administrative district (zila) of the princely state of Gwalior in central India. Gwalior state existed from the 18th century until shortly after Indian Independence in 1947. Geographically, the district included most of the present-day districts of Guna and Ashoknagar, along with a portion of northeastern Vidisha district. The administrative headquarters of the district was the town of Isagarh. The district was overseen by a subah, or district magistrate, who answered directly to the Sadr Board, the governing administrative body of the state.

== After independence ==
After Indian Independence in 1947, the state of Gwalior acceded to the Government of India, and its territory was integrated into the new state of Madhya Bharat. The territory of several feudal estates (Thakurs and Zamindars), including Sirisi, Umri, Raghogarh, Paron, Theka, Aron, Miana, Garha, Bajrangarh, and Bahadurpur, were merged into Isagarh District, and it was renamed Guna District. Madhya Bharat state was merged into Madhya Pradesh on 1 November 1956. Guna District was split into the districts of Guna and Ashoknagar on 15 August 2003.
