= Gwalior Residency =

Gwalior State political office

- Agency of British India
- 1782–1947
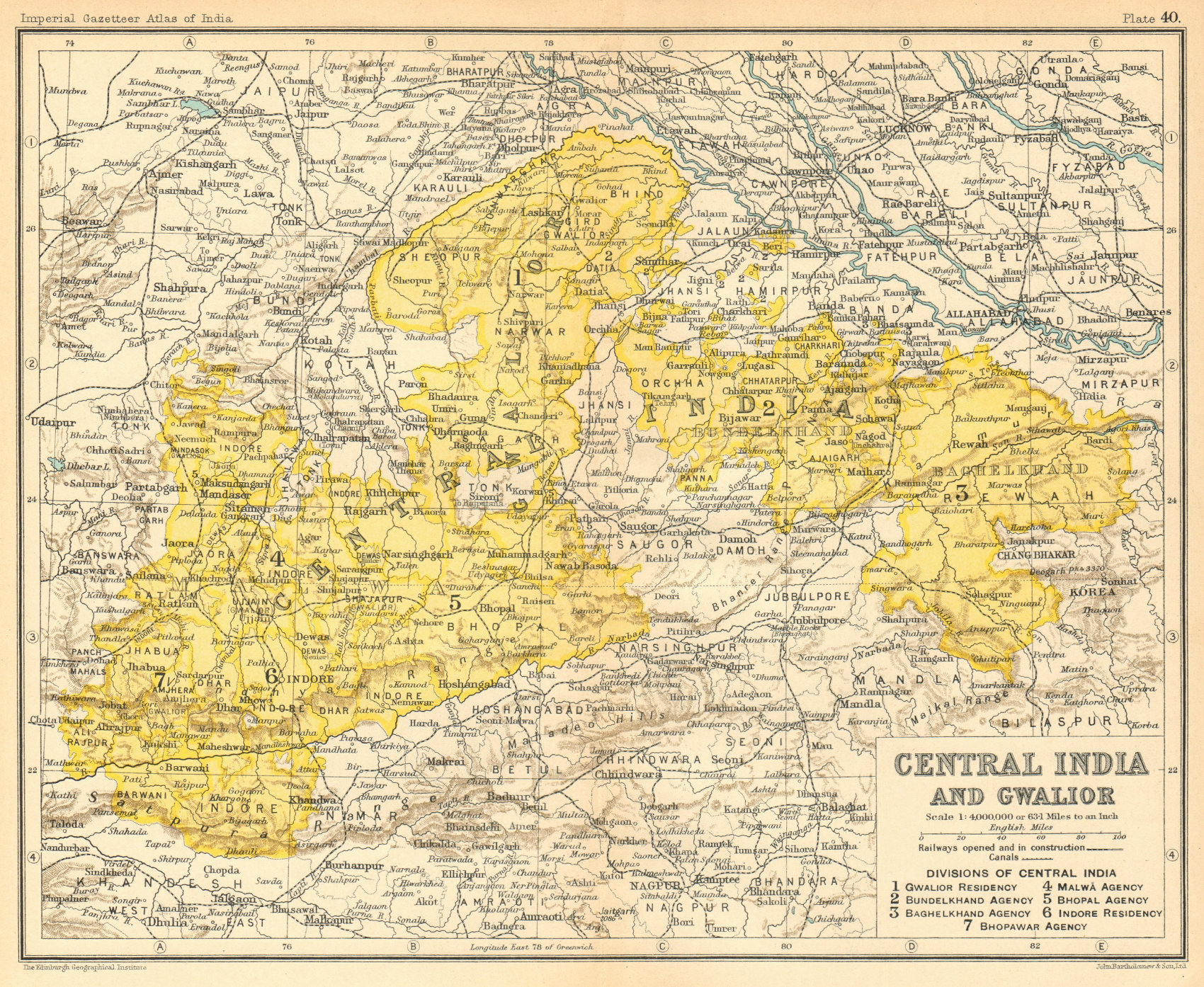
- Map of Central India in 1909 with the Gwalior Residency in its northern and western sectors
- Capital: Gwalior
- Area
  - 1901: 46,167 km^{2} (17,825 sq mi)
- Population
  - 1901: 2,187,612
- History
  - Treaty of Salbai: 1782
  - Gwalior separated from Central India Agency: 1921
  - Rampur and Benaras transferred to Gwalior Residency: 1936
  - Independence of India: 1947
Preceded by	Succeeded by
Maratha Empire	India

Gwalior Residency was a political office in the British Indian Empire, which existed from 1782 until the British withdrawal from India in 1947.

The Gwalior Residency was placed under the Central India Agency in 1854, and separated from it in 1921.

== States under the residency ==
The Gwalior residency dealt with a number of Princely States of Central India. Salute states, in order of precedence :

- principally Gwalior State, title Maharaja Scindia, Hereditary salute of 21-guns
- Rampur, title Nawab; Hereditary salute of 15-guns
- Benares, title Maharaja, Hereditary salute of 13-guns (15-guns local)

Non-salute states :

- Bhadaura,
- Garha
- Khaniadhana
- Paron
- Raghugarh
- Umri
- Agra Barkhera.
- Kathaun
- Khiaoda
- Sangul Wardha
- Sirsi

Also the Chhabra pargana (district) of Tonk State

== History ==
After the Treaty of Salbai was concluded in 1782 between the British and Maharaja Mahadji Sindhia of Gwalior, David Anderson, who contributed to drafting the treaty, was appointed resident at the Gwalior court. The court was a moving camp until 1810, when Mahadji's successor Daulat Rao Sindhia permanently fixed his headquarters near the fortress of Gwalior, on the spot where Lashkar city now stands. Daulat Rao Sindhia was forced to sign a treaty of subsidiary alliance with the government of British India in 1817 at the conclusion of the Third Anglo-Maratha War. The Resident at Gwalior answered directly to the Governor-General of India until 1854, when Gwalior Residency was placed under the authority of the Central India Agency. The fortress of Gwalior was captured by rebels during the Indian Rebellion of 1857, and recaptured by British troops in 1858, who occupied the fortress until 1886. In 1860 the smaller states were made into a separate charge, under the officer commanding the Central India Horse at Guna. This arrangement was abolished in 1896, when these states were again placed under the resident, with the officer commanding at Guna continuing to act as ex officio assistant to the Resident, with very limited powers. In 1888 Khaniadhana state was transferred from the Bundelkhand Agency to the Resident at Gwalior, and in 1895 the Gwalior State districts of Bhilsa and Isagarh were transferred from Bhopal Agency to the Gwalior Residency. In 1921 Gwalior Residency was separated from the Central India Agency, and the resident again answered directly to the Governor-General. In 1936 the princely states of Benares and Rampur, which had previously been under the authority of the United Provinces, were placed under the authority of the Gwalior resident.

The Resident, as the officer accredited to the Gwalior ruler, was also in all matters of general policy the channel of communication between the ruler and other political officers, such as the agents of Malwa and Bhopawar, within whose charges isolated portions of Gwalior State were situated. He exercised a close supervision over the minor holdings of the residency, all criminal cases of any importance in which were either dealt with by him personally or submitted for his sanction and approval. He also had the powers of a District and Session Judge for portions of the Midland and Bina-Baran sections of the Great Indian Peninsula Railway, which passed through the states of Gwalior, Datia, Samthar, Khaniadhana, and the Chhabra pargana.

The headquarters of the political officer were situated in the area known as The Residency, a piece of land measuring 1.17 square miles (3.0 km^{2}) situated close to Morar, about four miles (6 km) to the east of Gwalior fort. The area was administered by the resident, and included three villages, the revenue from which were devoted to the upkeep of the Residency limits. In 1901 the population of the Residency was 1,391. The Great Indian Peninsula Railroad and Gwalior Light Railways and the Agra-Bombay and Bhind-Jhansi high roads traversed the charge.

The Gwalior residency was abolished upon Indian Independence at the stroke of midnight on 15 August 1947, when all treaty relations between the British crown and the princely states of India were nullified. The rulers of the states acceded to the Government of India between 1947 and 1950, and most of the Gwalior Residency, including Gwalior State, were incorporated into the new Indian state of Madhya Bharat, with Rampur and Benares going to Uttar Pradesh. Madhya Bharat was merged into Madhya Pradesh state on 1 November 1956.

== Population and Geography ==
The population of the residency was 2,187,612 in 1901, of whom Hindus numbered 1,883,038, or 86 percent; animists 170,316, or 8 percent; Muslims 103,430, or 4 percent; and Jains 30,129, or 1 percent. In 1901 the residency had an area of 17,825 square miles (46,170 km^{2}), 17,020 square miles (44,100 km^{2}) of which belonged to Gwalior State. The density of population was 123 persons per square mile. By 1931 the population of the areas covered by the Residency had grown to over 3.5 million.

The charge contained 6820 villages and sixteen towns in 1901, of which the chief were Lashkar, Morar, Gwalior, Guna, Bhind, Bhilsa, Narwar, Ujjain and Chanderi. Bhilsa, Morena, Ujjain and Guna were the chief centres for the sale of grain, and Chanderi for the manufacture of fine cloth.

== See also ==
- Gwalior State
- List of Maratha dynasties and states
