= Shadora =

- Town
- Location in Madhya Pradesh
- Coordinates: 24°37′17″N 77°35′34″E
- Country: India
- State: Madhya Pradesh
- District: Ashoknagar
- Subdistrict: Ashoknagar
- Elevation: 527 m (1,729 ft)

Population (2011)
  - Total: 7,053

Languages
- Time zone: UTC+05:30 (IST)
- Pincode: 473330
- Telephone code: 07543
- Vehicle registration: MP 67

Shadora is A town and tehsil in Ashoknagar district in the Indian state of Madhya Pradesh. It is situated on the Bina-Kota railway line. Its std code is 07543 and pin code is 473330. Shadora is well known for its Narayan das story and famous Hanuman tekeri temple. Shadora, formerly known as city of Narayan das. The railway line is in the separate side of the city. Shadora has a Railway station and Bus stand. Shadora is connected to the main cities of M.P. by the means of road.

Shadora is located on the western part of Ashok Nagar. It comes under the northern part of Malwa plateau. The Sindh is the main river flowing along the western boundary is situated on the Kota-Bina railway section of Western Central Railway. Shadora is approximately 200 km away from the capital of the state Bhopal.

== Etymology ==
It is believed that the Mughal emperor frequently visited this town and had spent a night in Shadora, hence the name is Shadora.

== Climate ==
Shadora has a sub-tropical climate with hot summers from late March to early July, the humid monsoon season from late June to early October, and a cool dry winter from early November to late February. Summers start in late March, and along with other cities like Nagpur and Delhi, are among the hottest in India and the world. Temperatures peak in May and June with daily averages being around 33–35 °C (91–95 °F), and end in late June with the onset of the monsoon. shadora receives 970 mm (38 in) of rain every year, most of which is concentrated in the monsoon months from late June to early October. August is the wettest month with about 310 mm (12 in) of rain. Winter in shadora starts in late October, and is generally very mild with daily temperatures averaging in the 14–16 °C (57–61 °F) range, and mostly dry and sunny conditions. January is the coldest month with average lows in the 5–7 °C range (40–45 °F) and occasional cold snaps that plummet temperatures to close to freezing.

== Demographics ==
7,053 residents were recorded in Shadora in the 2011 census. Of this population, 74.53% were literate, while Scheduled Castes and Scheduled Tribes represented 27.38% and 9.88% of the population respectively. Furthermore, 2,590 individuals from the total population were involved in work-related activities. Among them, 77.45% were engaged in what is classified as Main Work, meaning they had employment or earned income for more than six months of the year. The remaining 22.55% participated in Marginal Work, which provided livelihood for less than six months. Of those involved in Main Work, 432 were cultivators, either as owners or co-owners of land, and 471 worked as agricultural laborers.

== Religious and devotional places ==
- Hanuman tekri: Temple on the city's top most historic hill

An ancient temple of lord Hanuman, almost around 600 years. Visitors to this temple are not only from the same city but also from almost all the central and northern states like Uttar-Pradesh, Uttaranchal, Punjab, Delhi and many more.

- Khundalpur Dham : A Very Silent & Religious Place of shadora. It is a Hindu temple and is claimed to be Lord Shiva. This temple is located at the outside of Shadora. It is about 2 kilometers from the city. Every Shivratri huge devotee come across the nearby area and paid their prayer to lord Shiva.
- SiddhBawa Dham: it is a famous and holy place of shadora city. Every dooj of holi and diwali huge devotee come all over the state. a big celebration celebrate ever year on holi and diwali. it is located at Naisarayn mayana road.
- Ganesh Temple: it is old temple of Shadora. every year, a day before dol gyaras a grand procession of lord ganesha is also being carried out from this temple across the city. this the only temple of Lord Ganesha in this city and maintain by dixit trust. many people from different states come to see this temple.
- Shiv Mandir: it is same as the Khundalpur Dham Temple
- Gadi Mandir: it is also a very old temple of this city and maintain by Sharma trust.
- Jain Temple: Famous Parasnath Digamber Jain temple is believed to be miraculous and was constructed many years ago.

== Schools of Shadora ==
- Rao Satish Vidya Niketan
- Drupadi Public School
- Govt. Boys Higher secondary school
- Kerla public school
- City public school
- Bina ball mandir
- Girls school
- Swami Vevekanandh School
- Kids World English School
- Kerla Pablich School
- Ban Sthaly Vidhya Peeth
- Sarsawti Vidhya Bihar

Culture:- The city lies in the Bundelkhand region and follows traditional Indian culture. The dialects spoken are of Hindi mixed with Bundelkhandi and Khadi bhasa. Shadora has a Hanuman tekri temple called Phadiye. Shadora has a maruti pasu mela. A huge fair is organized every year on Hanuman jayanti at which there is buying and selling of animals.

== Main festivals ==
All national festivals, Holi, Diwali, Mahashivratri, Shri Krishna Janmashtami, Ramnavami, Makara Sankranti, Eid-ul-Fitr, Christmas, Rakshabandhan, Mahavir jayanti, Hanuman jayanti, Buddha Poornima, Guru Nanak Jayanti, Sant Ravidas and Ghasiram Jayanti and other local ones such as Nag-Panchmi, Shreenath Mahadji Maharaj Punyatithi, Gangaur, Teej, Gudi Padwa (Marathi New Year), Navratri, Durga Puja are celebrated with equal enthusiasm. Last decade has seen a rise in the celebration of events. shadora also celebrates Rang Panchami quite differently. This festival is celebrated five days after Dulendi or Holi. This is also celebrated like Dulendi, but colours are mixed with water and then either sprinkled or poured on others.

=== Durga Puja ===
A Glimpse of Bengal can be seen in the City of Guna. During the Durga puja celebrations several cultural events are organized and is celebrated on a large scale. Thousands of people daily visits the puja pandal to get the blessings of Goddess Durga. Makar Sankranti is a 'Kite Festival' on 14 January each year, where people fly kites and compete to cut each other's kites in the sky.
