= Tyumen (inhabited locality) =

Tyumen (Russian: Тюмень) is the name of several inhabited localities in Russia.

Urban localities

- Tyumen, a city in Tyumen Oblast

Rural localities

- Tyumen, Altai Krai, a selo in Belovsky Selsoviet of Troitsky District in Altai Krai; 52°56′N 84°36′E
- Tyumen, Irkutsk Oblast, a village in Cheremkhovsky District of Irkutsk Oblast
- Tyumen, Kirov Oblast, a village in Spas-Talitsky Rural Okrug of Orichevsky District in Kirov Oblast; 58°24′N 49°13′E
- Tyumen, Perm Krai, a village in Yusvinsky District of Perm Krai
