= Tyumensky =

Tyumensky (masculine), Tyumenskaya (feminine), or Tyumenskoye (neuter) may refer to:

- Tyumensky District, a district of Tyumen Oblast, Russia
- Tyumensky (rural locality), a rural locality (a settlement) in Krasnodar Krai, Russia
- Tyumen Oblast (Tyumenskaya oblast), a federal subject of Russia
- Tyumenskaya (rural locality), a rural locality (a village) in Sverdlovsk Oblast, Russia
