= Mungaoli =

- town
- Location in Madhya Pradesh, India Mungaoli (India)
- Coordinates: 24.42°N 78.1°E
- Country: India
- State: Madhya Pradesh
- District: Ashoknagar
- Elevation: 472 m (1,549 ft)

Population (2011)
  - Total: 27,000

Languages
  - Official: Hindi
- Time zone: UTC+5:30 (IST)
- PIN: 473443
- Telephone code: 07548
- ISO 3166 code: IN-MP
- Vehicle registration: MP-67

Mungaoli is a town and a nagar panchayat in Ashoknagar district in the Indian state of Madhya Pradesh. It is situated on the Bina-Kota railway line.

== Geography ==
Mungaoli is located at 24.42°N 78.1°E. It has an average elevation of 472 metres (1,549 feet). Betwa River is only 5 km far from Mungaoli.

== Demographics ==
As of 2013 India census, Mungaoli had a population of 40,000. Males constitute 51% of the population and females 49%. Mungaoli has an average literacy rate of 69%, higher than the national average of 58.5%: male literacy is 74%, and female literacy is 58%. In Mungaoli, 20% of the population is under 2 years of age.
