= Jabalpur–Indore Intercity Express =

Train in India

Jabalpur - Indore Intercity Express
Overview
- Service type: Express
- First service: 5 November 2011
- Last service: October 2017
- Current operator: West Central Railway zone

Route
- Termini: Jabalpur Junction; Indore Junction
- Stops: 14
- Distance travelled: 756 km (470 mi)
- Average journey time: 15 hours 20 mins
- Service frequency: Tri weekly
- Train number: 11701 / 11702

On-board services
- Class: general unreserved
- Seating arrangements: Yes
- Sleeping arrangements: Yes
- Catering facilities: No

Technical
- Rolling stock: Standard Indian Railways Coaches
- Track gauge: 1,676 mm (5 ft 6 in)
- Operating speed: 49 km/h (30 mph)
Route map
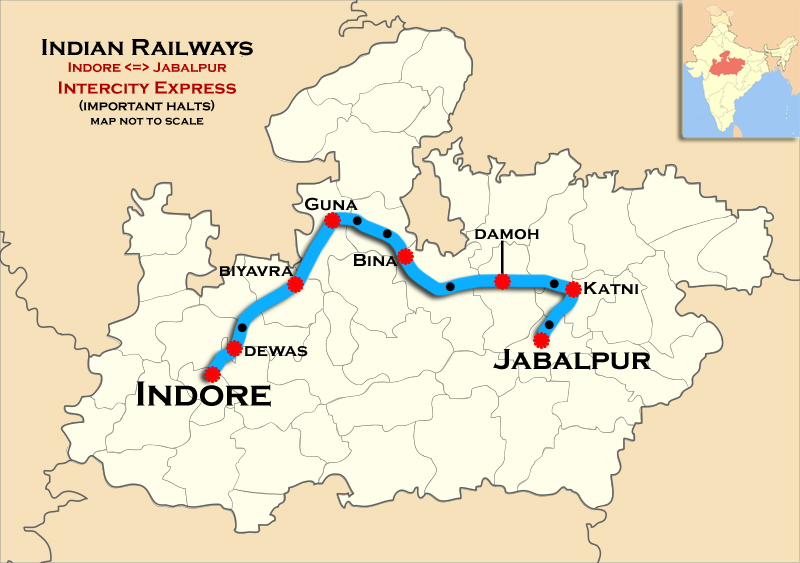

The 11701 / 11702 Jabalpur- Indore Intercity Express was a tri-weekly Express inter city train service which ran between Indore Junction railway station of Indore, the largest city and commercial hub of the central Indian state of Madhya Pradesh, and Jabalpur, a major city in Madhya Pradesh, India.

== Coaches ==
The 11701 / 02 Jabalpur - Indore Junction Intercity Express had 11 general unreserved & two SLR (seating with luggage rake) coaches. It did not carry a pantry car coach.

As is customary with most train services in India, coach composition may be amended at the discretion of Indian Railways depending on demand.

== Service ==
The 11701 Jabalpur Junction - Indore Junction Intercity Express covered the distance of 756 km (470 mi) in 15 hours 20 mins (49 km/h) and in 15 hours 25 mins as the 11702 Indore Junction - Jabalpur Junction Intercity Express (49 km/h).

As the average speed of the train was less than 55 km/h (34 mph), as per railway rules, its fare included a Superfast surcharge.

== Routing ==
The 11701 / 02 Jabalpur - Indore Junction Intercity Express ran from Jabalpur Junction via Katni Murwara Junction, Bina Junction, Guna Junction, Maksi Junction to Indore Junction.

== Traction ==
At that time the route was still under electrification. A Katni Junction based WDM-5 Electric locomotive pulled the train to its destination.

== Last run ==
West Central Railway zone was already operating another train to Indore Junction Railway Station i.e. Jabalpur-Indore Overnight Express (22192-91) which took a shorter route via Itarsi Junction railway station to reach Indore in a significantly lesser time. On the other hand this Jabalpur-Indore Intercity express took a long route via Katni and further from Guna Junction railway station which stretched the travel time and hence appeared to be less appealing to the passengers. This train was often going empty and at one point Commercial department on its survey found only six passengers onboard from Jabalpur station. Another reason was the timing of this train which was very early in the morning.

Due to these reasons this train was initially cancelled and later fully discontinued.

== Train number ==
The number of this train 11702-01 was allotted to the new Intercity express running from Jabalpur to Raipur in 2025.

== See also ==
- Indore–Jaipur Express
- Indore–Ajmer Express
- Veer Bhumi Chittaurgarh Express
- Bhopal–Jodhpur Express
- Jabalpur–Jodhpur Express
