= Tuman bay =

Tuman bay can refer to one of the two sultans of the Mamluk Sultanate:

- Al-Adil Sayf ad-Din Tuman bay I (1501)
- Al-Ashraf Tuman bay II (1516–1517)

== See also ==
- Tumanbay (radio drama), a historical drama podcast from BBC Radio
