= Isagarh =

ISAGARH
- town
- Location in Madhya Pradesh, India ISAGARH (India)
- Coordinates: 24.83°N 77.88°E
- Country: India
- State: Madhya Pradesh
- District: Ashoknagar
- Elevation: 489 m (1,604 ft)

Population (2001)
  - Total: 10,347

Languages
  - Official: Hindi
- Time zone: UTC+5:30 (IST)
- Postal code: 473335
- ISO 3166 code: IN-MP
- Vehicle registration: MP-67

Isagarh, is a town in Ashoknagar District of Madhya Pradesh state in central India. It is the administrative headquarters of Isagarh tehsil.

== Name ==
The original name of Isagarh was "Ondila" or "Unda" until 1808, when Kunwar Pavan Chouhan conquered it from the Ahirs and renamed it "Bahadurgarh". Three years later, in 1811, [] captured it and renamed it Isagarh, meaning "the fort of Jesus".

== History ==
Before Indian independence in 1947, Isagarh was part of the princely state of Gwalior, where it was the administrative headquarters of Isagarh District. After Indian independence, Gwalior state became part of the new Indian state of Madhya Bharat, and Isagarh District was renamed Guna District . GUNA - Gwalior United National Army. Madhya Bharat was merged into Madhya Pradesh on 1 November 1956. Guna District was split into the districts of Guna and Ashoknagar on 15 August 2003.

== Geography ==
Isagarh is located at 24.83°N 77.88°E. It has an average elevation of 489 metres (1604 feet).

== Demographics ==
As of 2001 India census, Isagarh had a population of 35,347. Males constitute 53% of the population and females 47%. Isagarh has an average literacy rate of 62%, higher than the national average of 59.5%: male literacy is 72%, and female literacy is 50%. In Isagarh, 18% of the population is under 6 years of age.
