= Tumen, Madhya Pradesh =

Tumen
- Location in Madhya Pradesh
- Coordinates: 24.488°N 77.712°E
- Country India: India
- State: Madhya Pradesh
- District: Ashoknagar

Languages
- Time zone: UTC+5:30 (IST)
- Area code: 473331

Tumen is a village in Ashoknagar district of Madhya Pradesh state of India.

Tumen is a historical place 9 km from Dis. Ashoknagar. In south direction. Here is many ancient temples and stachue. Vindyvashni temple goddess temple here, hazarmukhi temple baldau ji temple, maa mahishasur mardini temple, triveni river and other temple and place situated here

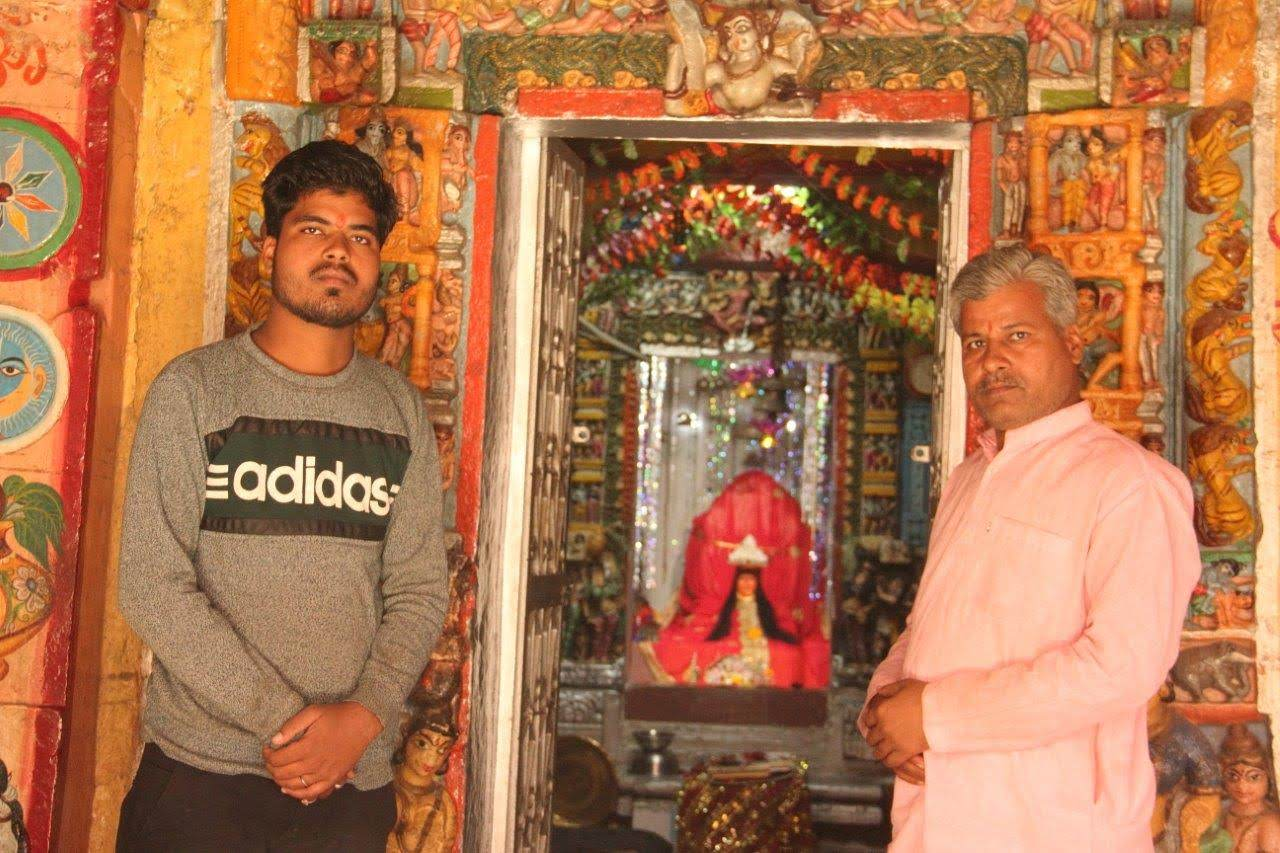
tumen

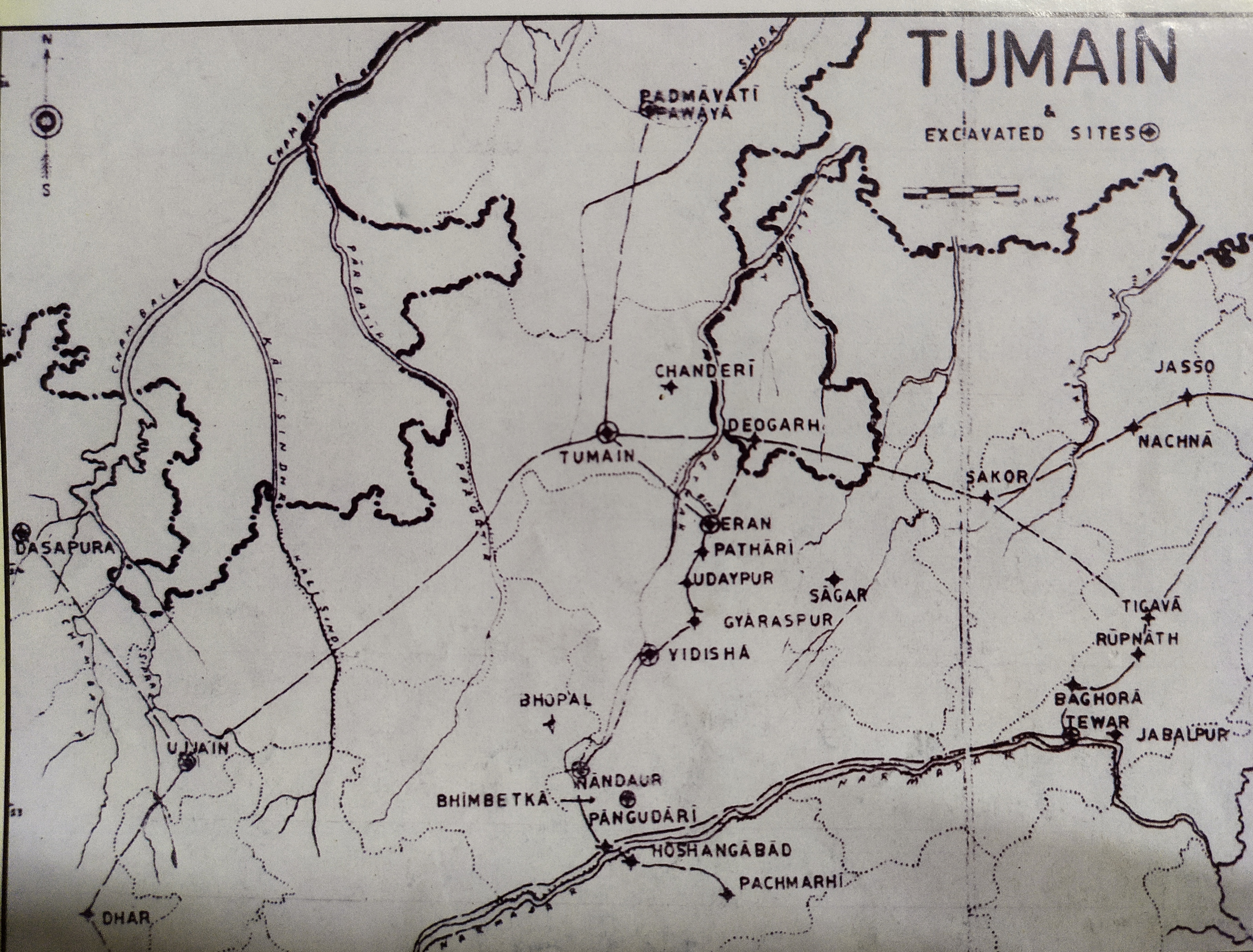
tumen
