= Ashoknagar district =

- District
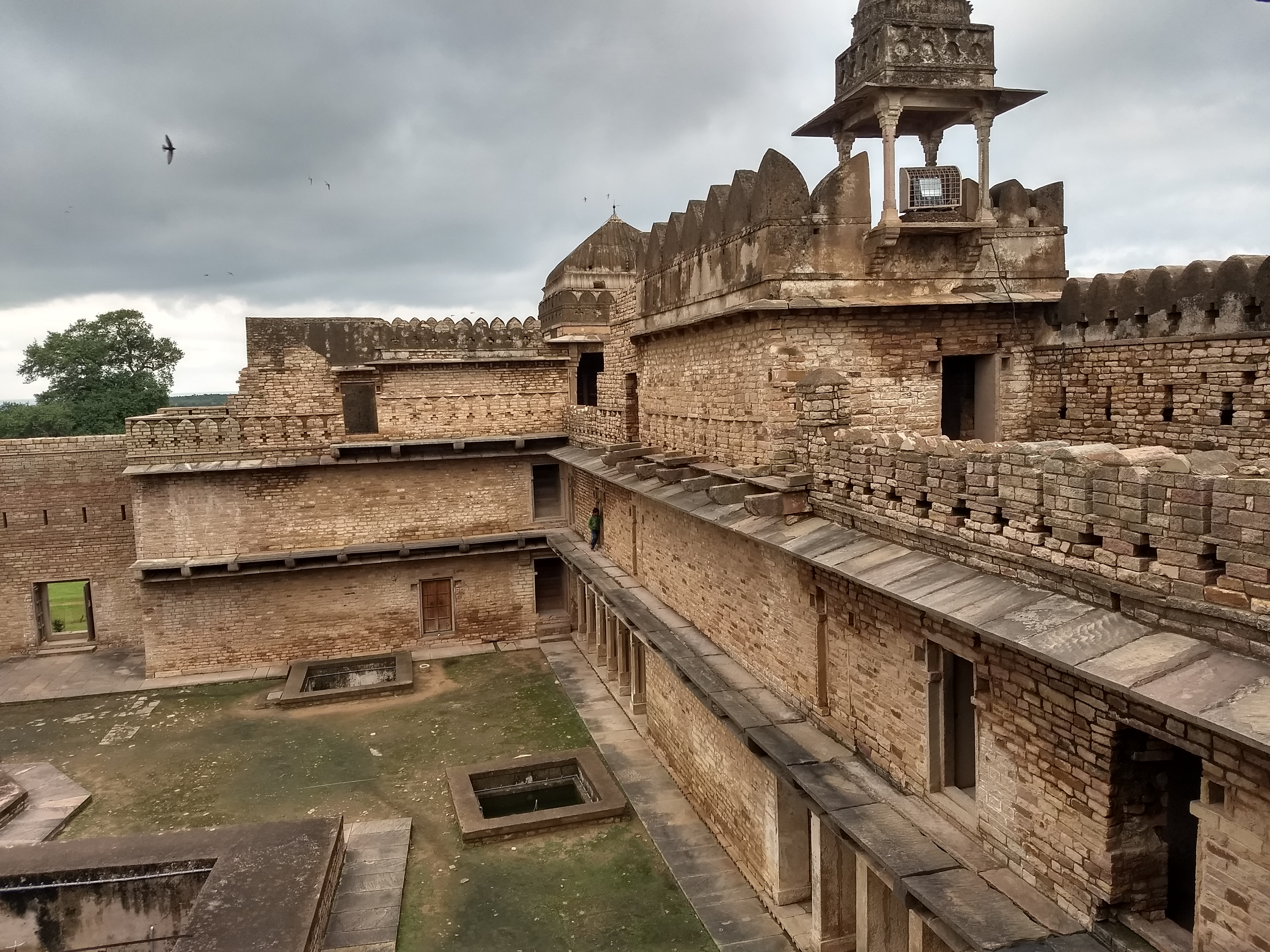
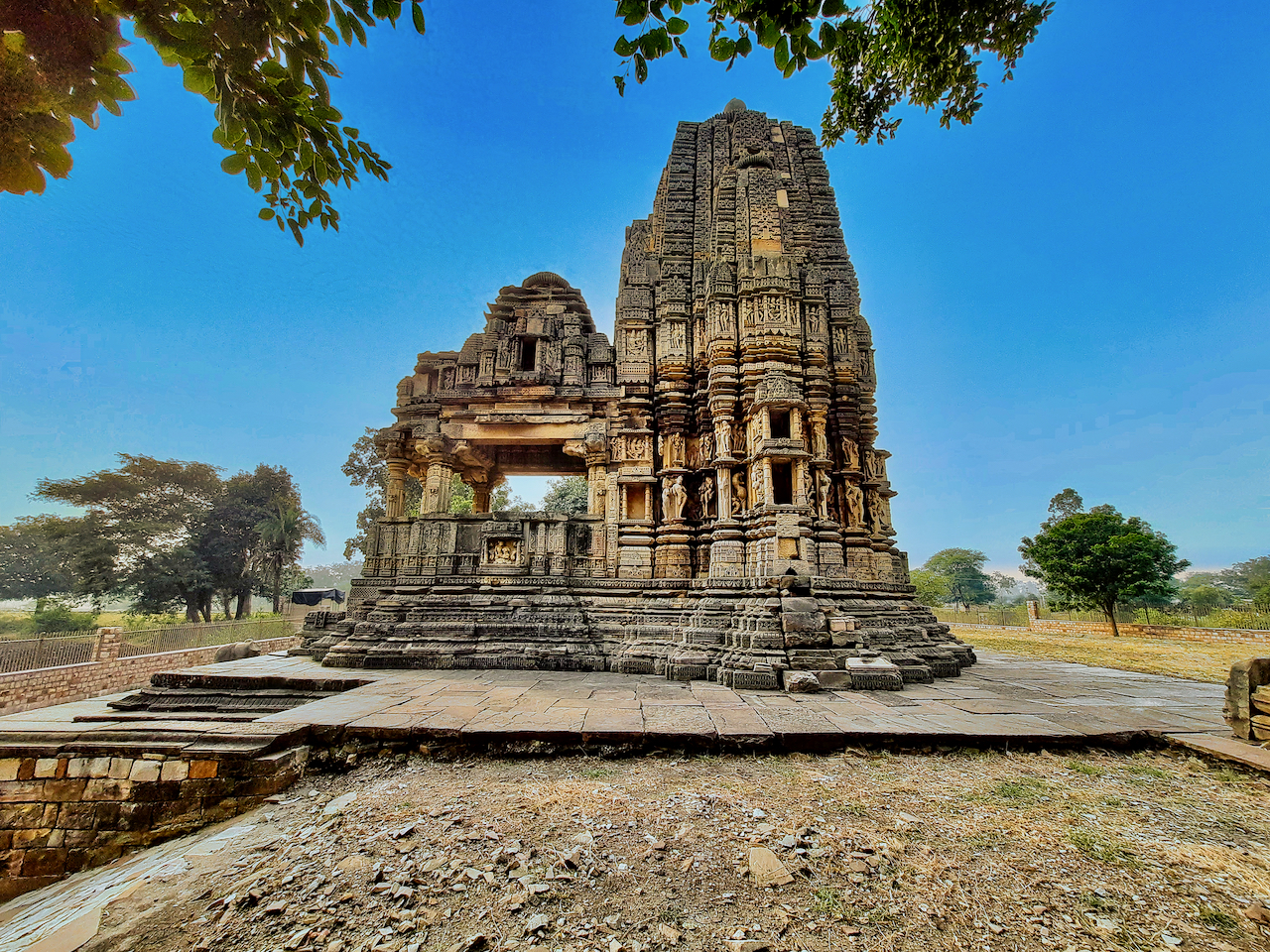
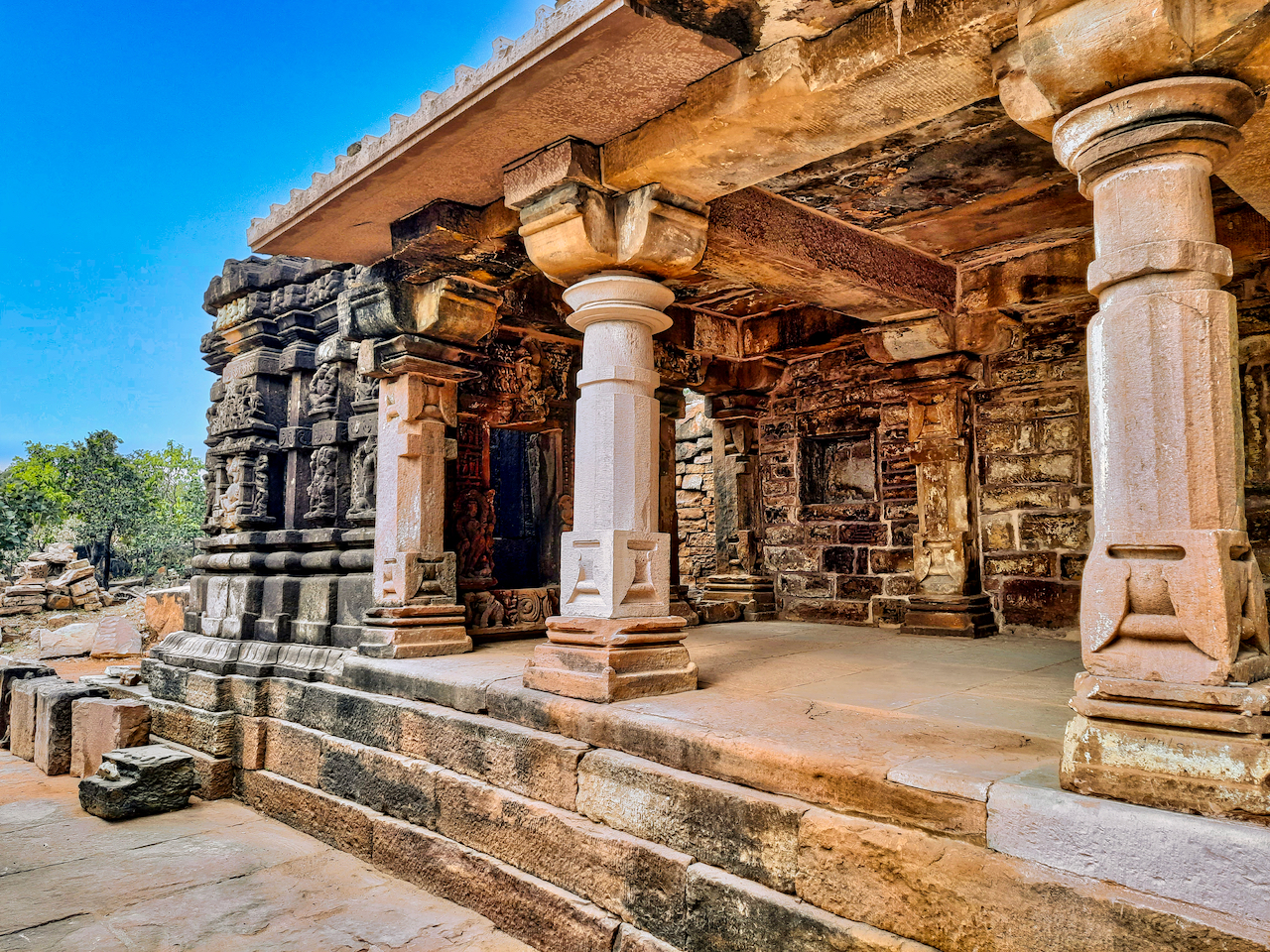
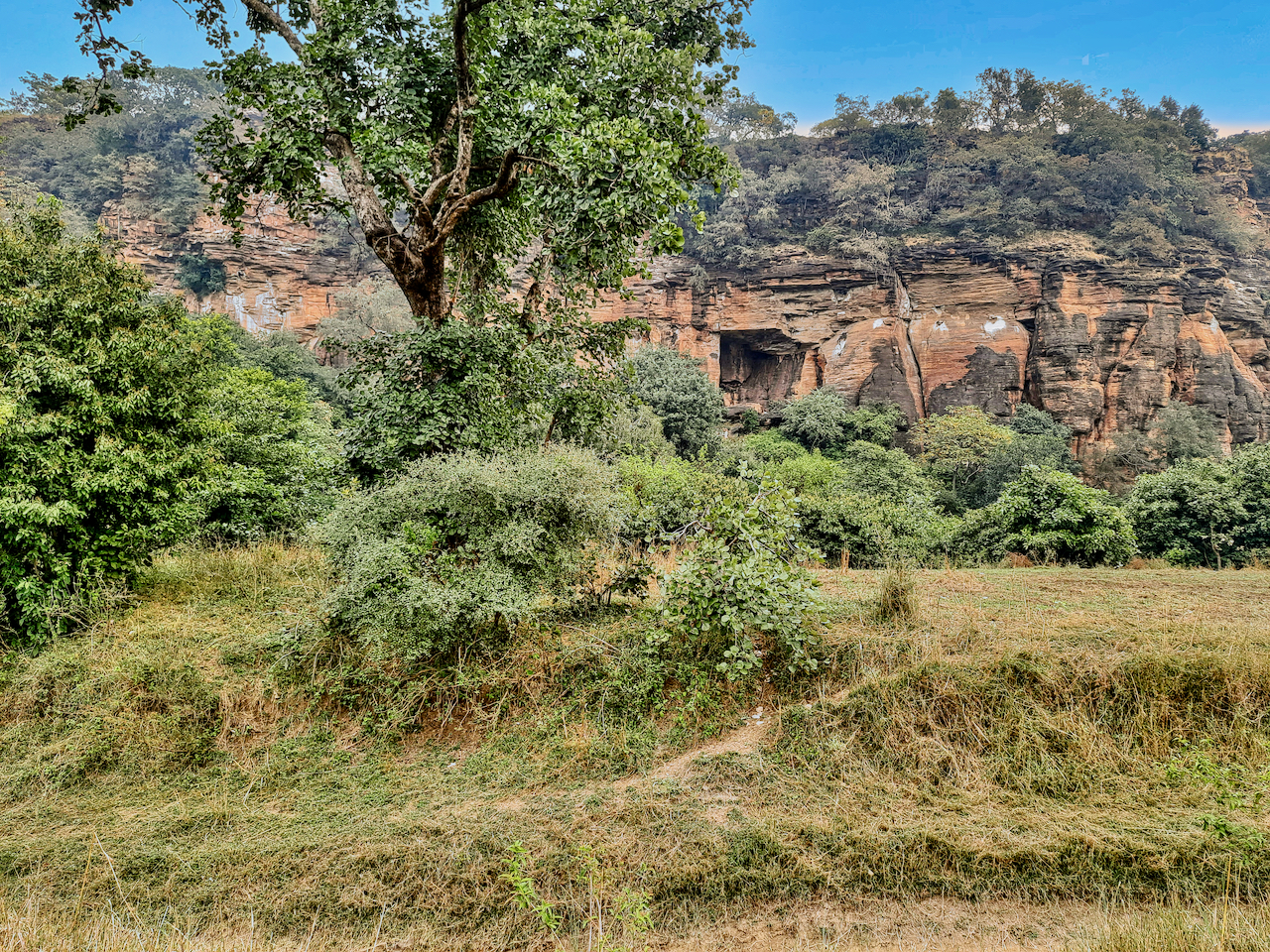
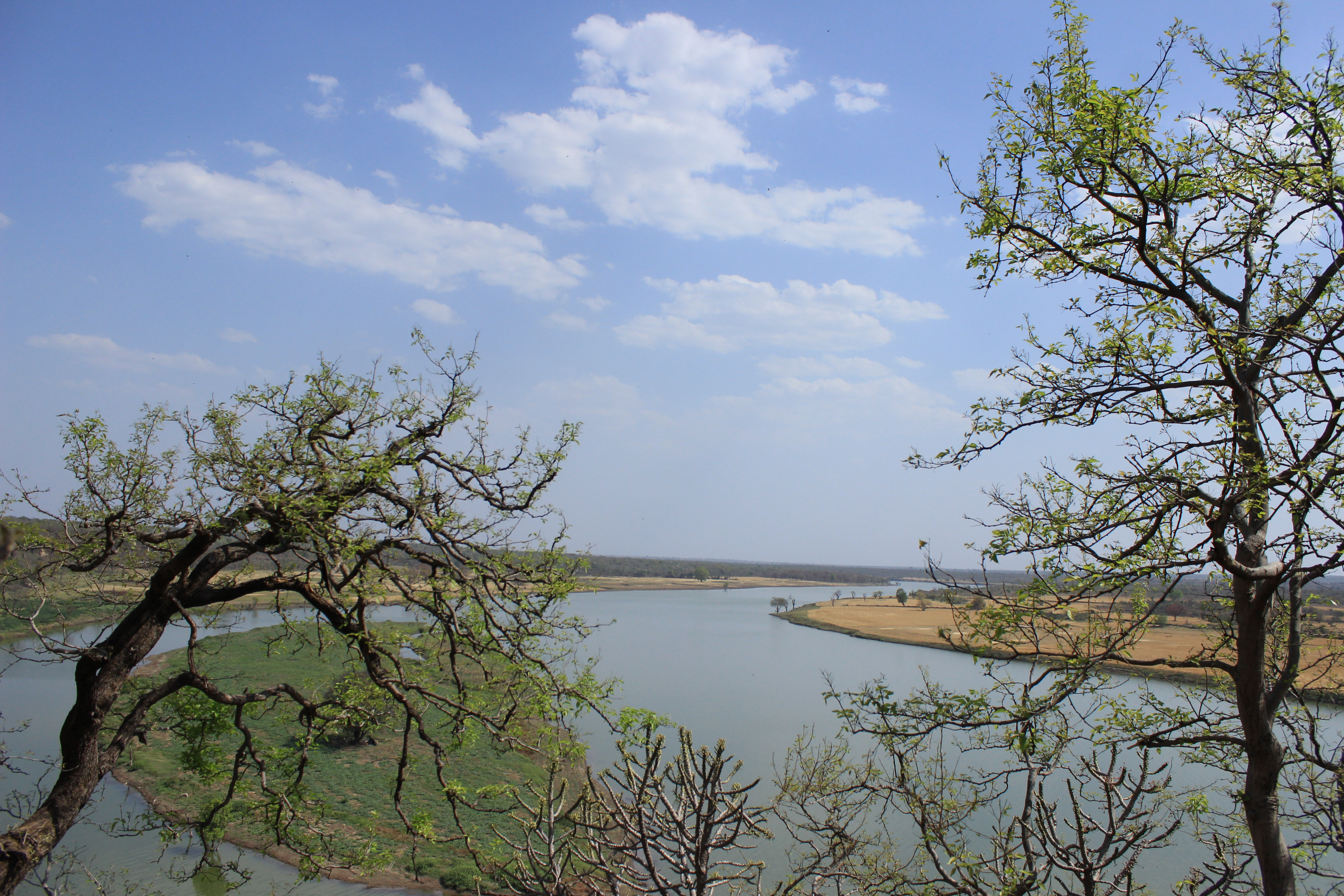
- Clockwise from top-left: Chanderi fort, Toteshwara Mahadev Temple in Kadwaha, Rakhetra Bhiyadant Caves, Betwa River near Ashoknagar, Kuti Temples in Thubon, vindyvashni temple and many other temple in tumen,

- Location of Ashoknagar district in Madhya Pradesh
- Country: India
- State: Madhya Pradesh
- Division: Gwalior division
- Headquarters: Ashoknagar

Government
  - Lok Sabha constituencies: Guna

Area
  - Total: 4,673.94 km^{2} (1,804.62 sq mi)

Population (2011)
  - Total: 845,071
  - Density: 180.805/km^{2} (468.282/sq mi)

Demographics
  - Literacy: 67.90
  - Sex ratio: 900
- Time zone: UTC+05:30 (IST)
- Website: ashoknagar.nic.in

Ashoknagar district (Hindi pronunciation: [ə'ʃoːk nəgəɾ]) is a district of Madhya Pradesh state in central India. The city of Ashoknagar is the administrative headquarters of the district. Ashoknagar district was formed in 2003.

== Geography ==
The district has an area of 4673.94 km^{2}. It is bounded on the east by the Betwa River, which separates it from Lalitpur District of Uttar Pradesh and Sagar District of Madhya Pradesh. Vidisha District lies to the south. The Sindh River forms the western border of the district, which separates it from Guna District. Shivpuri District lies to the north.

The district has a population of 688,920 (2001 census). It is divided into eight tehsils: Ashoknagar, Chanderi, Isagarh, Mungaoli, Shadora, Naisarai, Piprai and Bahadurpur. The district was created on August 15, 2003, when it was split from Guna District. Ashoknagar also has a great historical importance. It is a part of ancient Ahirwada region. The details of the Block wise population and area is shown in the table below:

Name of Block	Area in Square KM	Population
Chanderi	1035.50	130532
Ashoknagar	1237.48	227404
Mungaoli	1229.04	182497
Isagarh	1078.35	138160
Shadora	--------	--------
Piprai	--------	--------
Naisaray	--------	--------
Bahadurpur	--------	--------

== History ==
The region was ruled by the Scindia family as a part of Isagarh District of the Indian princely state of Gwalior. After the Ujjain victory on his return King Ashoka took a night halt at Pachhar and henceforth Pachhar was called Ashoknagar.

The territory of present Ashoknagar district was part of Chedi kingdom of Shishupal in Mahabharata period and Chedi Janapada in Janapada period. In medieval period was part of Chanderi State. In the 6th century B.C. Chanderi area (territory of Ashoknagar district) was under Avanti, Dasharna and Chedi Janapadas. It was part of Nanda, Maurya, Sunga and Magadh kingdoms. It is believed that the Great Emperor Asoka, while on his trip to conquer Ujjain, had spent one night in Ashoknagar, hence the area been named AshokNagar. After the Magadh, Sungas and Sakas of Naga dynasty ruled over it. Subsequently, after the Guptas and the Maukharias, it formed part of the empire of Harshvardhan. In 8th–9th century AD, it went to the Pratihara dynasty. The seventh descendant of the Pratihara dynasty, Raja Kirtipal founded Chanderi city in the 10th−11th century AD. and made it his capital. After the fall of the Pratihara dynasty, the Chandelas of Jejak bhukti also ruled here briefly. Chanderi kingdom was also affected by repeated invasions of Mahmud Ghaznavi in the 11th century AD. After establishment of Delhi Sultanate, Turks, Afghans and Mughalas ruled it. During the reign of Chanderi's Bundela ruler Morprahalad, Gwalior ruler Daulatrao Scindia sent his general John Baptiste to attack Chanderi. He captured Chanderi and also Isagarh and nearby areas. The last Bundela ruler of Chanderi Raja Mardan Singh made supreme sacrifice as a freedom fighter in 1857–58 AD.

The district was created on August 15, 2003, when it was split from Guna District. Shahdora a town 15 km from Ashoknagar had been given tehsil status in September 2008.

== Demographics ==
Historical population
Year	Pop.	±% p.a.
1901	150,821	—
1911	178,313	+1.69%
1921	173,070	−0.30%
1931	192,710	+1.08%
1941	215,970	+1.15%
1951	218,282	+0.11%
1961	277,795	+2.44%
1971	357,456	+2.55%
1981	444,551	+2.20%
1991	559,257	+2.32%
2001	688,940	+2.11%
2011	845,071	+2.06%

Religions in Ashoknagar district (2011)
Religion	Percent
Hinduism	92.09%
Islam	4.82%
Jainism	1.79%
Sikhism	0.95%
Other or not stated	0.35%

In 2011 census, Ashoknagar had population of 845,071. Hindus constitute 92% of the population.

The district has a population density of 181 inhabitants per square kilometre (470/sq mi). Its population growth rate over the decade 2001-2011 was 22.66%.[4]

Ashoknagar has a sex ratio of 904 females for every 1000 males, and a literacy rate of 66.42%. 18.19% of the population lives in urban areas. Scheduled Castes and Scheduled Tribes make up 21.44% and 0.87% of the population respectively.

Hindi is the predominant language, spoken by 98.57% of the population.

Average literacy rate of Ashoknagar in 2011 were 67.90 compared to 62.26 of 2001. If things are looked out at gender wise, male and female literacy were 80.22 and 54.18 respectively. For 2001 census, same figures stood at 77.01 and 45.24 in Ashoknagar District. Total literate in Ashoknagar District were 480,957 of which male and female were 299,409 and 181,548 respectively. In 2001, Ashoknagar District had 344,760 in its total region. With regards to Sex Ratio in Ashoknagar, it stood at 900 per 1000 male compared to 2001 census figure of 879. The average national sex ratio in India is 940 as per latest reports of Census 2011 Directorate. Scheduled Castes and Tribes made up 20.80% and 9.71% of the population respectively.

== Tourism ==
In the south, about 35 km from Ashoknagar, is the 'Karila Mata Mandir', which is known to be the birthplace of Luv and Kush, sons of Lord Rama and Sita Mata. A huge fair is organized every year on Rangpanchmi in which Rai Dance is performed by Bedni Women. Tumen is also a historical lgrim centre situated at Triveni known for Mata Vindhyavasini temple. There are many more places of religious importance in the district of Ashoknagar.

Chanderi is a tehsil of Ashoknagar district and is a historical & tourist palace. The main occupation of the people of Chanderi is handicraft. Chanderi sarees are known all over the world. These are made by cotton and silk by hand through Khatka. Khatka is a self made machine for preparing sarees. Another place in Ashoknagar district is Shri Anandpur, the world headquarters of Shri Advait Paramhansa Sect. Disciples from across the globe visit Anandpur twice a year during Baisakhi and Guru Purnima to seek blessings from the gurus. Kadwaya, a small village in the district is also known for the ancient Shiv Mandir, Garhi and Mata Mandir.

Chiniya cave near Nanon Village in Piprai Tehsil is a site of cave paintings by prehistoric man.

=== Chanderi ===
Chanderi fort is situated on a hill 71 meters above the town. The fortification walls were constructed mainly by the Muslim rulers of Chanderi. The main approach to present fort is through a series of three gates the uppermost of which is known as Hawa Paur and lowermost is called the Khuni Darwaja or the gate of blood. The peculiar name is derived from the fact that criminals were executed at this point by hurling them from the battlements above and thus dashing their bodies into pieces at foot. Within the fort there are only two ruined buildings the Hawa and Nau-Khanda Mahals built by Bundela Chiefs.

Tumen

=== Chanderi Fort ===
To the south west of the fort there is a gateway called katti-ghatti made through hill side. It is 59 meter long 12 meter broad and 24.6 meter high in the middle of its portion of the rock has been view into the shape of a gate, with a points arch, flanked by a slopping towers.

=== Kaushak Mahal of Chanderi ===
The Kaushak Mahal of Chanderi is referred to in Tawarikh-i-Ferishta. It is recorded in it that, in A.H. 849(CAD 1445). Mehmood Shah Khilji of Malwa was passing through Chanderi. He ordered a seven storied palace to be built there. Kaushak Mahal is outcome of that order. It is an imposing building – though standing in a half ruined condition. To the south, east and north of the town are the palaces of Ramnagar, Panchamnagar and Singhpur respectively. All are built by Bundela Chiefs of Chanderi in the 18th century.

=== Isagarh ===
Kadwaya a small village of Ashoknagar tehsil contains a number of temples. One of these temples has been constructed in the 10th century in Kachhapaghata style of architecture. It has its garbha-griha (sanctum), antaral and mandapa. The temple contains short pilgrimis records of A.D. 1067 and 1105. Another old temple of Kadwaya is known as Chandal math. The village possesses a ruined monastery, from a very old record was picked up which it is stated that to monestor was built to house some members of Shaiva sect known as Matta Mourya. During Akbar's reign Kadwaya was the headquarters of a mahal in the Gwalior's sarkar of the subah of Agra.

=== Thubonji Siddha Kshetra ===
Here are a group of 26 temples. This sacred place Thuvonji came to knowledge during the period of the businessman Shri Padashah. It is said that Shri Padashah was dealing in Metal Tin and when he put his Metal Tin here it got converted into Silver. There are a group of 26 temples with many idols. Temple No. 15 is the main among them known as big temple here, with 28 feet high colossus of Lord Adinath in standing posture, installed in Vikram Samvat 1672. Atishay: It is said that sound of various musical instruments is heard in the night as the gods from heaven come here for prayers & worship. It is also said that after completion of this high colossus, so many devotees were unable to install this in standing posture, at that night Head of the function saw a dream and in the next morning he according dream worshiped the colossus and then he alone placed the high colossus standing. Temples: Lord parsvanath Jain Temple – There is a 15 feet high colossus of Lord Parsvanath (23rd Teerthankar) installed in V.S. 1864 with a serpent hood over the head; this hood is made by different serpents and may be seen in both the sides of colossus. Lord Shantinath Jain temple: 18 feet high standing posture of Lord Shantinath (16th Teerthankar). Ajitnath Jain Temple (2nd Teerthankar). Adinath Jain: Temple is also vast with 16 feet high colossus of Lord Adinath. This was installed by Shri Savasingh of Chanderi in V.S. 1873. He also completed the Choubeesee Mandir of Chanderi Chandraprabhu Jain Temple is new modern temple with principal deity Lord Chandraprabhu (8th Teerthankar), 1.5 feet in height in sitting posture (Padmasana). Museum: Some ancient idols are kept there, in them a standing 12 feet high idol.

== Employment ==
The occupation of the people there is mostly agricultural. Many people are engaged in grain merchandise. Business in the field of textiles and provisions is also quite active over there. In recent times, Commodity Exchange Market has also grown along with logistics business.

District Renewable Energy Shop In collaboration with the Ministry of New and Renewable Energy, Government of India and Madhya Pradesh Energy Development Corporation, a renewable energy shop has been opened for the smooth operation and quick maintenance of solar plants and installed plants in the district.

== Institutions ==
Ashoknagar has many English and Hindi medium schools:

- Tara Sadan Higher Secondary School
- Vardhman Higher Secondary School
- Shri Vivekananda Shishu Mandir High School, Kolua road
- Saraswati Vidya Mandir Higher Secondary School
- Shivpuri Public Higher Secondary School
- Sanskruti Kids School
- Sanskar Academy
- Muskan Public School
- Hardy Convent High School
- Dream India School
- Bright Model High Secondary School
- Jawahar Navodaya Vidyalaya.
- Blue Chip Public School
- Hights Public School
- Bal Bhawan School

=== Colleges ===
- Govt. Polytechnic College, Vidisha Road, Ashoknagar
- Govt. Nehru Degree College, Guna Road, Ashoknagar

== Geography ==
Ashoknagar is situated at the average elevation of 507 metres(1640 ft) above sea level. It is in the plateau region. It has an agricultural topography. The plateau is an extension of the Deccan Traps, formed between 60 and 68 million years ago at the end of the Cretaceous period. In this region, the main classes of soil are black, brown and bhatori (stony) soil. The volcanic, clay-like soil of the region owes its black colour to the high iron content of the basalt from which it is formed. The soil requires less irrigation because of its high capacity for moisture retention. The other two soil types are lighter and have a higher proportion of sand. The year is popularly divided into three seasons: summer, the rains, and winter. Summer extends over the months of Chaitra to Jyestha (mid-March to mid-May). The average daily temperature during the summer months is 35 °C, which typically rises to around 46 °C on a few days. The rainy season starts with the first showers of Aashaadha (mid-June) and extends to the middle of Ashvin (September). Most of the rain falls during the southwest monsoon spell, and ranges from about 100 cm in the west to about 165 cm in the east. Ashoknagar and surrounding areas receive an average of 140 cm of rainfall a year. The growing period lasts from 90 to 150 days, during which the average daily temperature is below 30 °C, but seldom falls below 20 °C. Winter is the longest of the three seasons, extending for about five months (mid-Ashvin to Phalgun, i.e., October to mid-March). The average daily temperature ranges from 15 °C to 20 °C, though on some nights it can fall as low as 5 °C. Some cultivators believe that an occasional winter shower during the months of Pausha and Maagha—known as Mawta—is helpful to the early summer wheat and germ crops.

=== Climate ===
The climate of Ashoknagar is sub-tropical. In summers, the temperature reaches 47 °C, while dropping to 4 °C in the winter. Rainfall is adequate and sometimes less.

== Tourist places ==
- Chanderi
- Anandpur
- Shri Chaubisi Jain Temple

== Transportation facility ==
Ashoknagar has good transport facilities. It is connected to main cities of the state as well as the cities around India by Railways and Roadways. It is situated on the Guna-Bina railway section of Western Central Railway. Ashoknagar is situated on the State Highway. It is Well connected with its surrounding district namely Guna, Vidisha and Shivpuri The length of state highways in the District is about 82.20 km. Ashoknagar is situated on the Western-Central Railway's broad gauge line of the Kota-Bina Section. Another rail link, viz., The total rail length in the district is about 141 km and the route kilometrage per 100 square KM is 1.27. Trains are available for Kota, Bina, Ujjain, Indore, Jodhpur, Jaipur, Ahamdabad, Bhopal, Sagar, Damoh, Jabalpur, Durg, Varanasi, Gorakhpur, Delhi, Deharadoon, Darbhanga and Gwalior.
