= Jabalpur =

City in Madhya Pradesh, India

Jabalpur Jubbulpore, Sanskardhani
- Metropolis
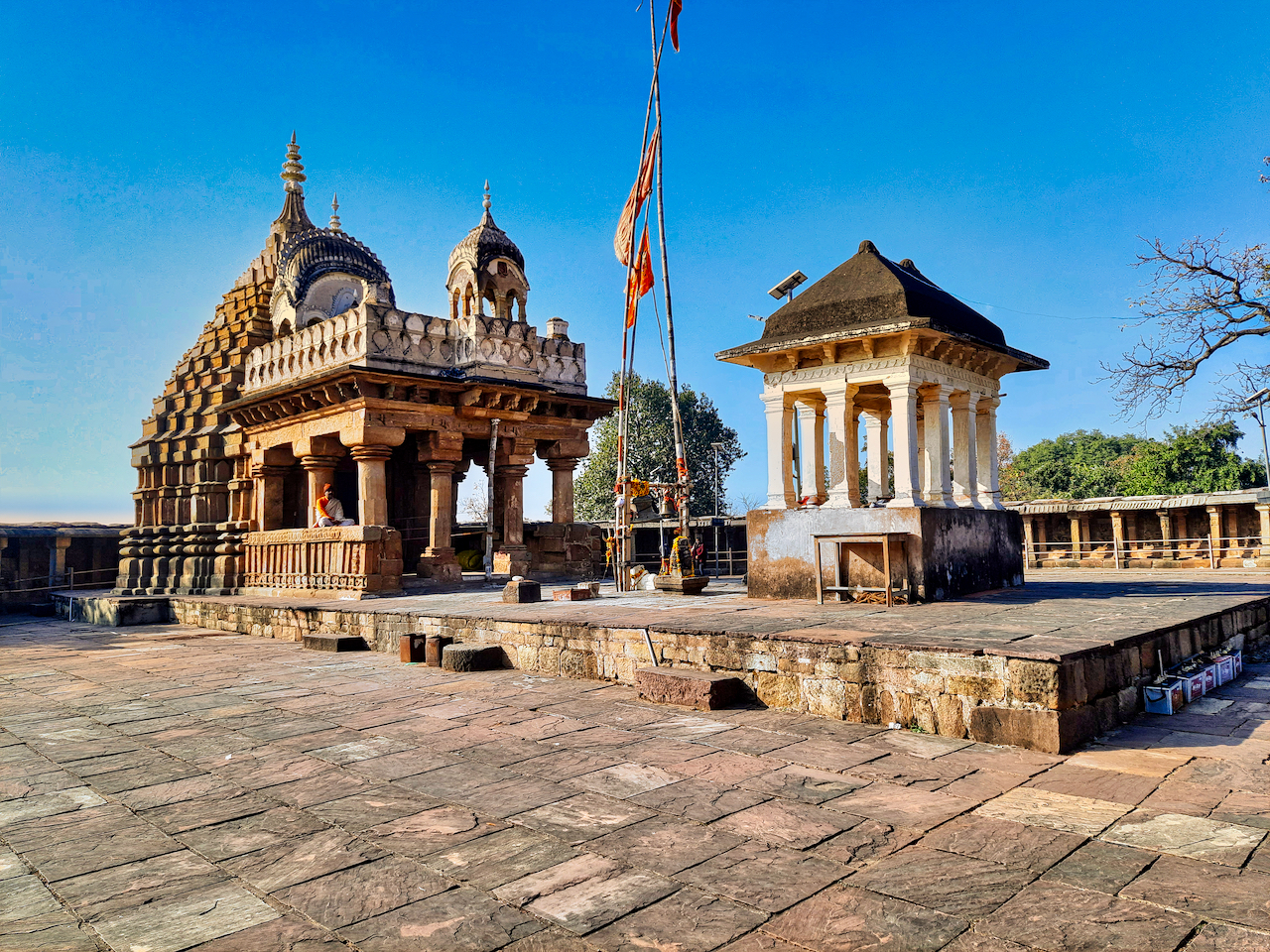
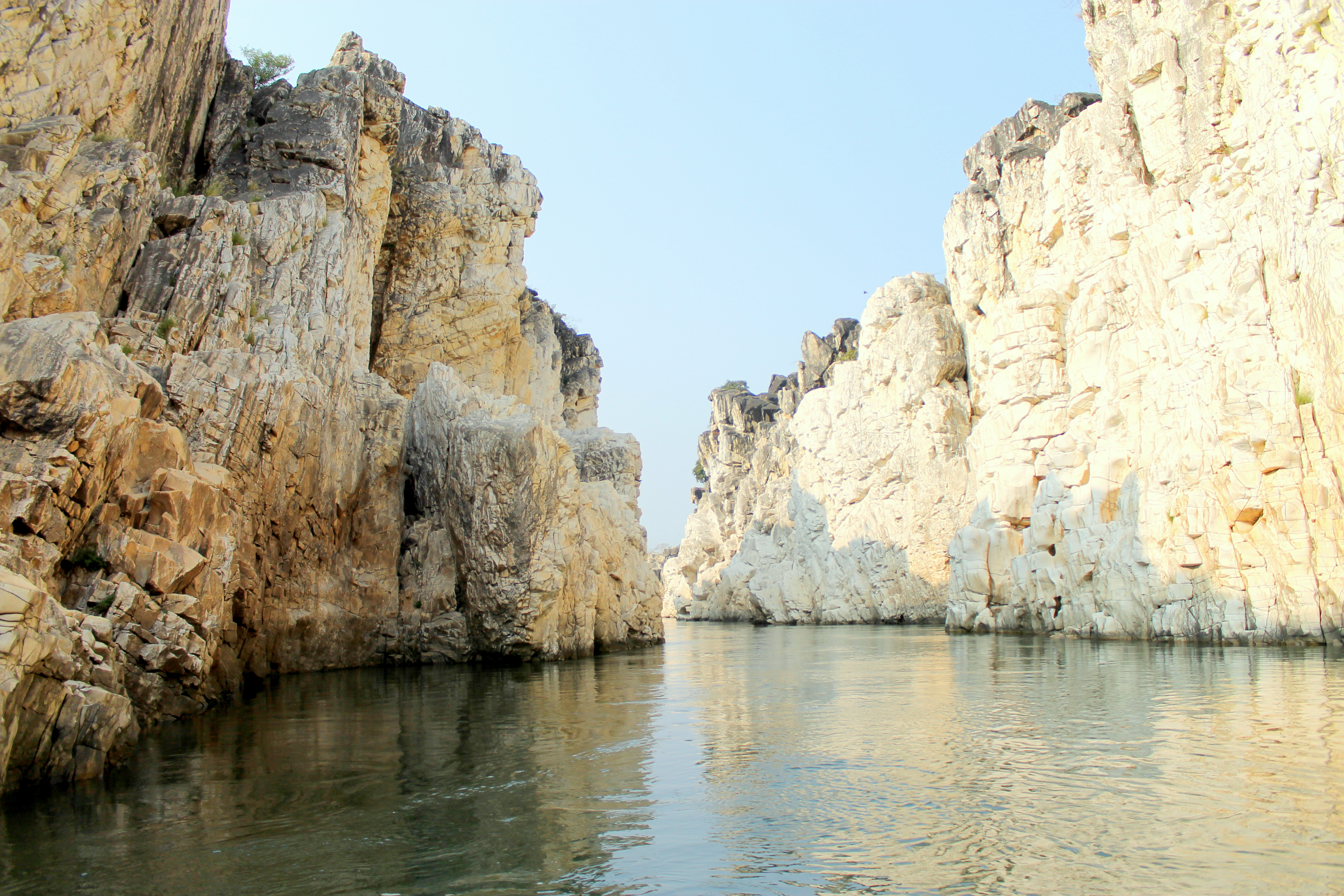
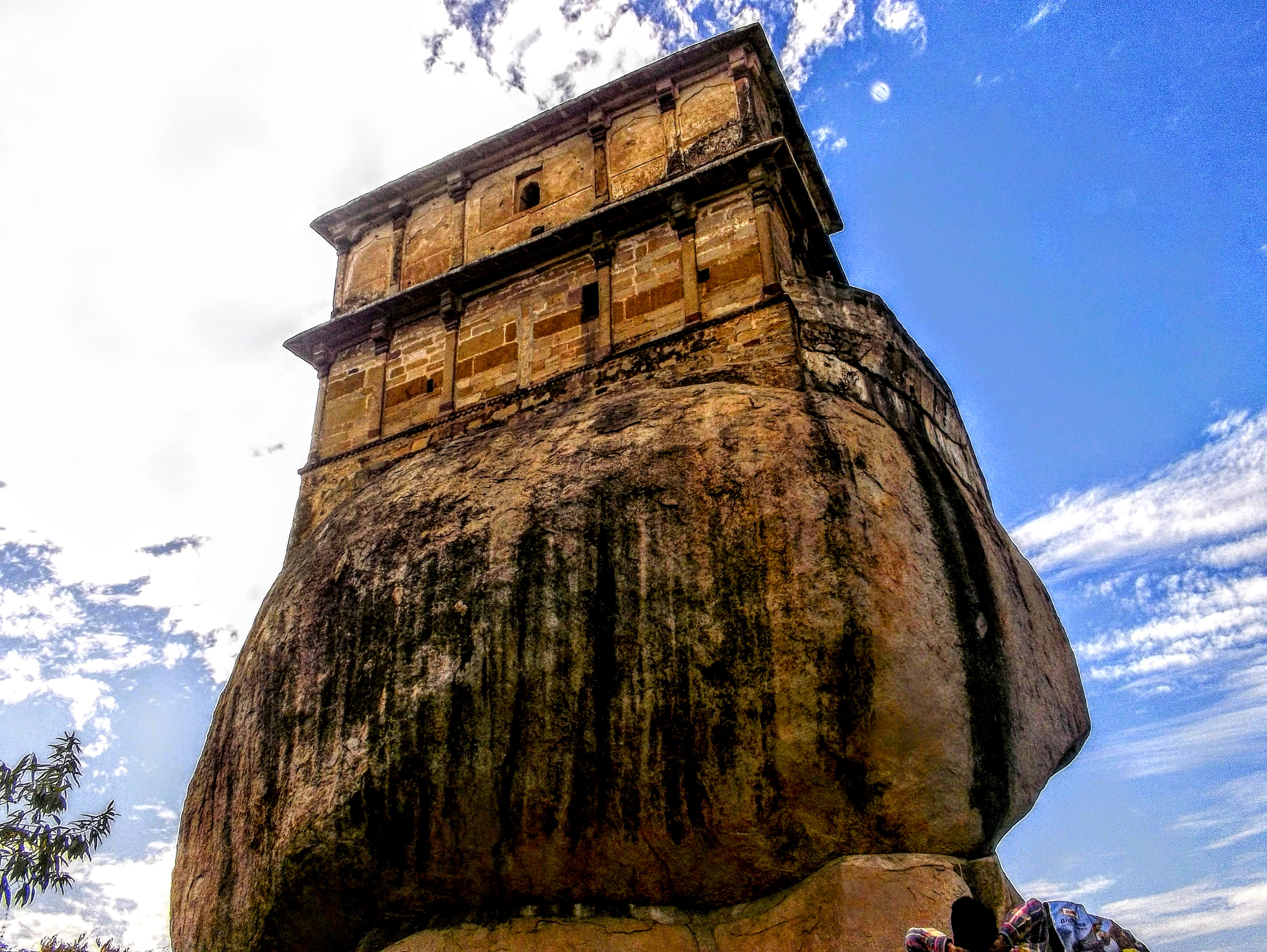
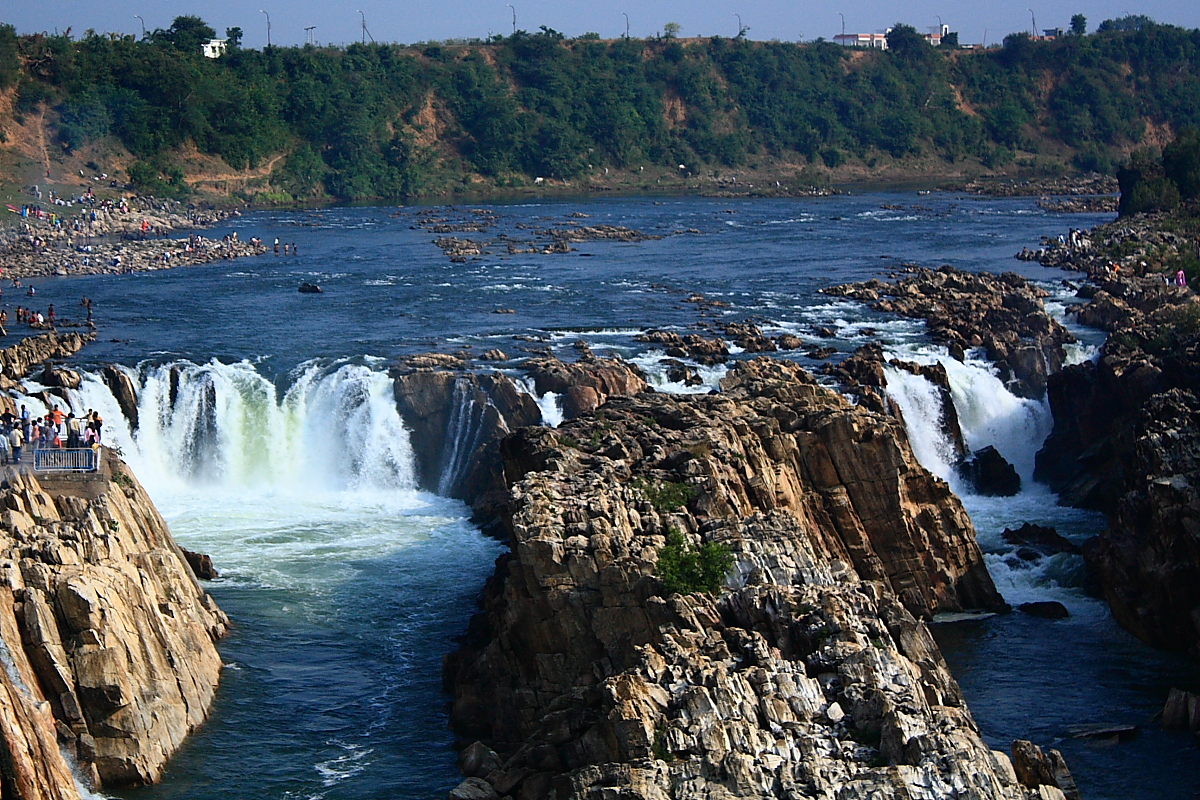
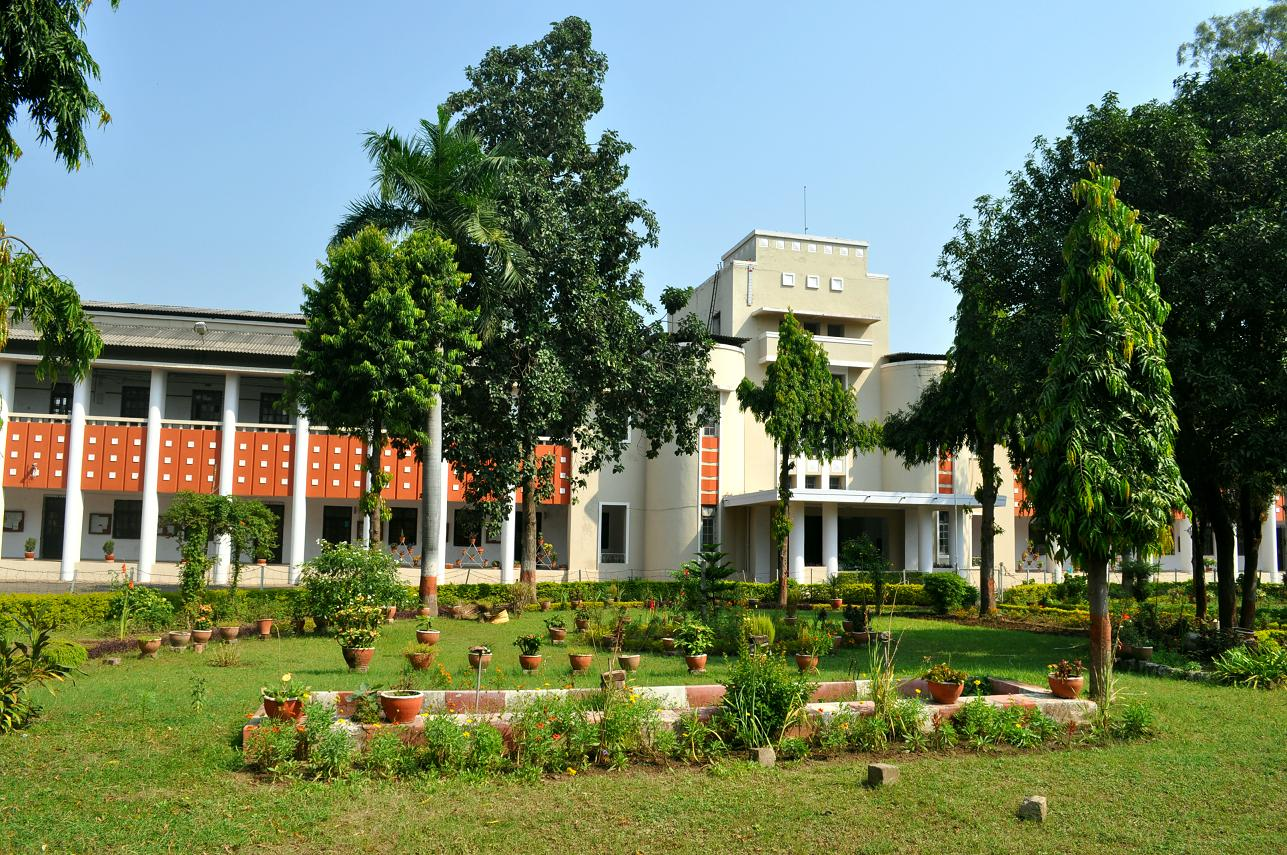
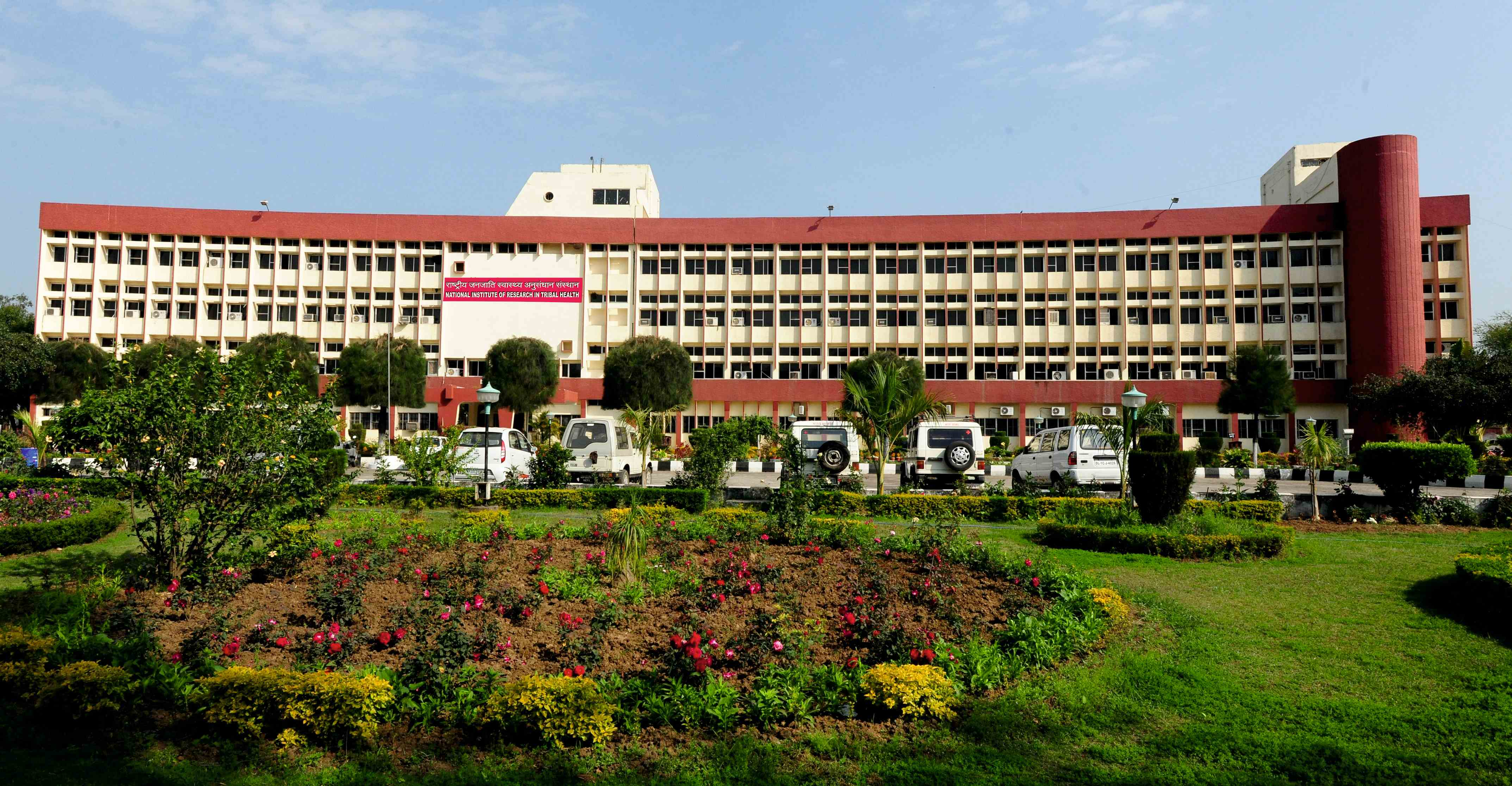
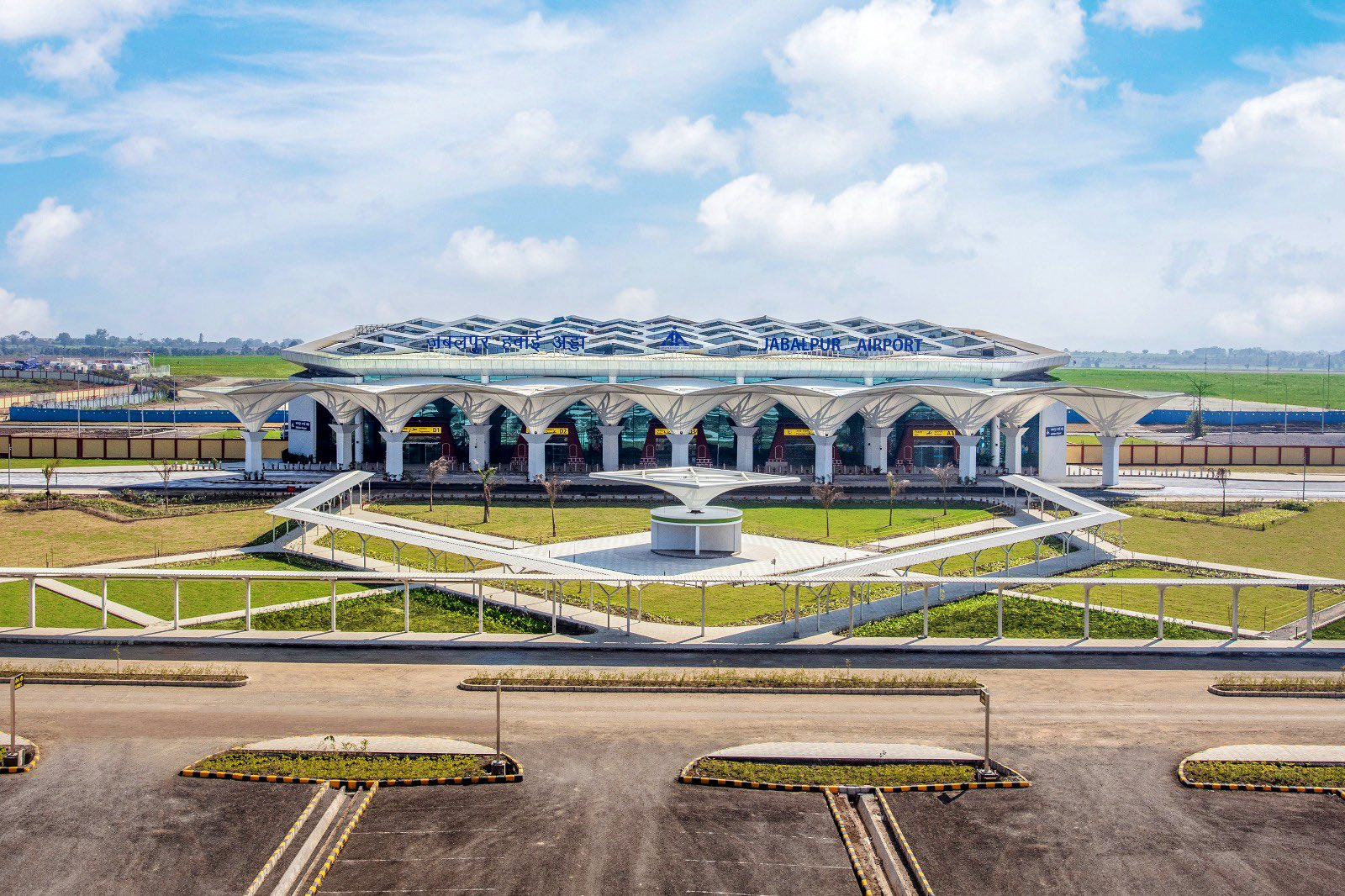
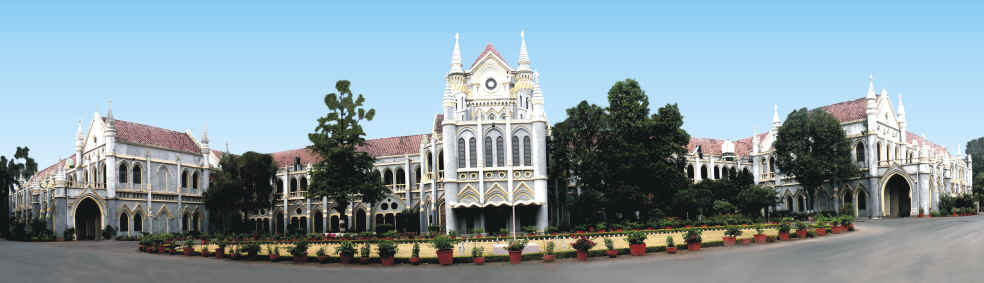
- Chausath Yogini and Gowri Shankar Temples Bhedaghat Madan Mahal Fort Dhuandhar Falls Jabalpur Engineering College ICMR-NIRTH Jabalpur Airport Madhya Pradesh High Court
- Nickname: Sanskardhani
- Location within Madhya Pradesh Location within India
- Coordinates: 23°10′N 79°56′E
- Country: India
- State: Madhya Pradesh
- District: Jabalpur

Government
  - Type: Municipal Corporation
  - Body: Jabalpur Municipal Corporation
  - Mayor: Jagat Bahadur Singh (BJP)

Area
  - Metropolis: 263.49 km^{2} (101.73 sq mi)
- Elevation: 412 m (1,352 ft)

Population (2011)
  - Metropolis: 1,055,525
  - Rank: 38th
  - Density: 4,005.9/km^{2} (10,375/sq mi)
  - Metro: 1,267,564
  - Metro rank: 38th
- Demonyms: Jabalpurians, Jabalpuriya, Jabalpurites
- Time zone: UTC+5:30 (IST)
- PIN: 482001 to 482011
- Telephone code: 0761
- ISO 3166 code: IN-MP
- Vehicle registration: MP-20
- Sex ratio: 929 ♀ / 1000 ♂
- Average Literacy Rate: 82.13%
- Official language: Hindi
- Website: jabalpur.nic.in

Jabalpur (IPA: [ˈd͡ʐəˌbəlpʊɾ]), formerly anglicised as Jubbulpore, is the fourth largest city by area of the Indian state of Madhya Pradesh. It is situated on the banks of the Narmada River in the state of Madhya Pradesh, India. Jabalpur is the administrative headquarters of the Jabalpur district and the Jabalpur division. The Madhya Pradesh High Court is located in the city.

It is generally accepted that the game of snooker originated in Jabalpur. Jabalpur is also the railway headquarters of the West Central Railway. Jabalpur Cantonment is one of the largest cantonments in India and houses the army headquarters of five states (Madhya Pradesh, Chhattisgarh, Orissa, Bihar and Jharkhand). The city is renowned for the Marble Rocks at Bhedaghat, an 8 km gorge sculpted entirely from pure marble by the ferocious Narmada River, as it descends from the Dhuandhar Falls boasting a rare status of being one of only three such gorges in the world, alongside Taroko Gorge in Taiwan and Trigrad Gorge in Bulgaria.

Jabalpur holds the distinction of being the first dinosaur fossil discovery site in Asia in 1828 near Bara Simla Hill by British officer William Henry Sleeman, with later finds in the region including dinosaur eggshells and fossils from species like Titanosaurus and Rajasaurus.

== Etymology ==
According to a prevalent theory, Jabalpur was named after a sage named Jabali, who meditated on the banks of the Narmada river. Another theory suggests an Arabic origin of the word since jabal (جبل) in Arabic means granite boulders or huge boulders, which were common in the region. According to a fringe theory, the name refers to Jauli Pattala, a sub-divisional unit, mentioned in Kalachuri inscriptions. Jauli also refers to the Huna queen of the Kalachuri king, Karna. It was spelled as Jubbulpore during British rule

In 2006, the Jabalpur Municipal Corporation renamed the city to Jabalpur.

== History ==
Mythology describes three Asuras (evil spirits) in the Jabalpur region, who were defeated by the Hindu god Shiva. Tripurasura being the main asura, gave the city its puranic name Tripur Tirth. Tripuri region corresponds to the ancient Chedi Kingdom of Mahabharata times, to which king Shishupala belongs.

Ashokan relics dating to 300 BCE have been found in Rupnath, 84 kilometres (52 mi) north of the city, indicating the presence of the Mauryan Empire (322 to 185 BCE) in the region. When the empire fell, Jabalpur became a city-state before coming under the rule of the Satavahana dynasty (230 BCE to 220 CE). After their reign, the region was ruled locally by the Bodhis and the Senas, following which it became a vassal state of the Gupta Empire (320 to 550).

The region was conquered by the Kalachuri Dynasty in 875 CE. The best known Kalachuri ruler was Yuvaraja-Deva I (r. 915–945), who married Nohla Devi (a princess of the Chalukya dynasty). One of the Kalachuri ministers, Golok Simha Kayastha, was instrumental in founding the Chausath Yogini Temple near Bhedaghat. His descendants include Bhoj Simha, who was the Dewan to the Gond king Sangram Shah (1491–1543); Dewan Aadhar Singh Kayastha, who was the prime minister to Rani Durgavati (r. 1550–1564), and Beohar Raghuvir Sinha, the last Jagirdar of Jabalpur who reigned until 1947.

=== Gond rule ===
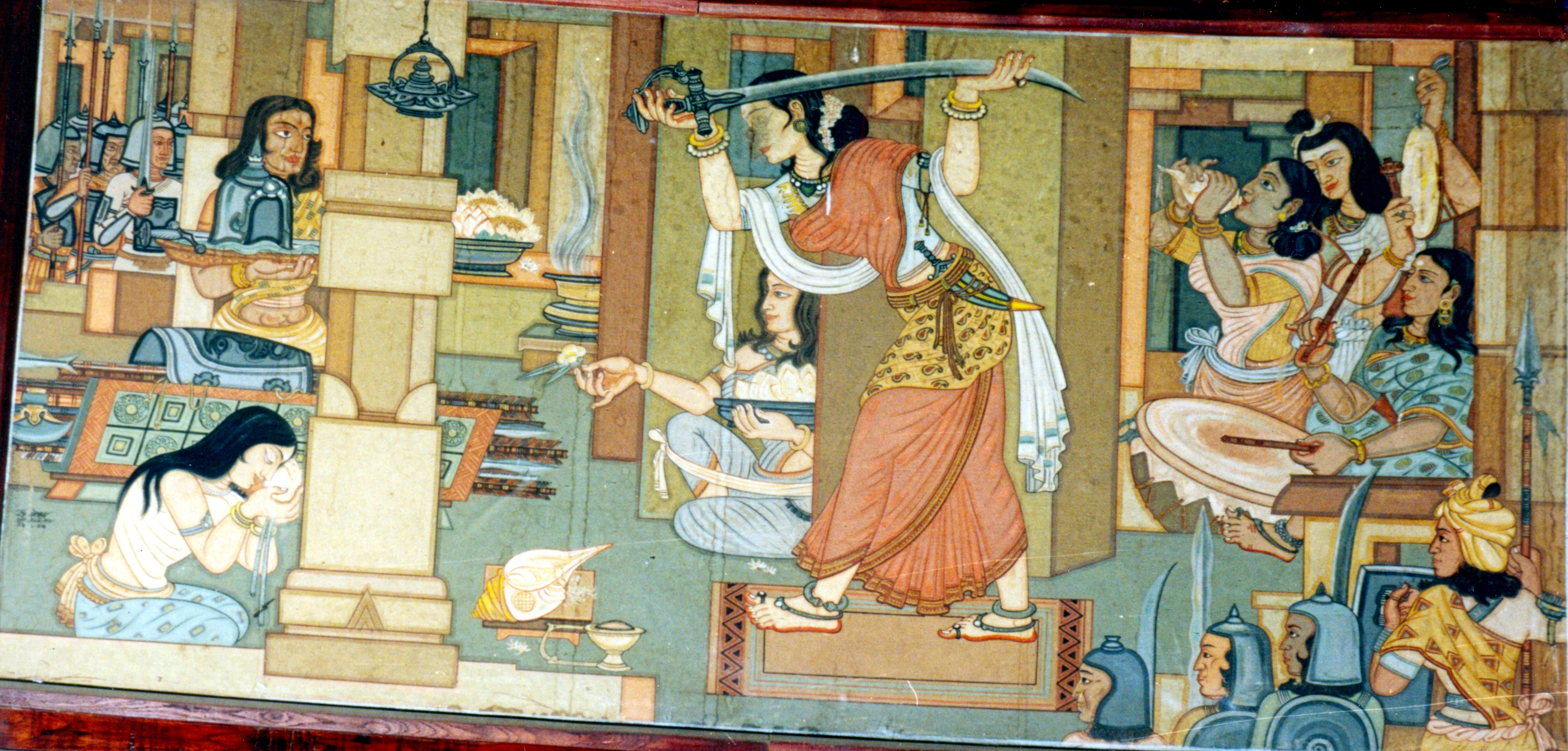
Rani Durgavati preparing for the battle of Narrai; fresco by Beohar Rammanohar Sinha in Jabalpur's Shaheed-Smarak

Jabalpur was an important centre of power during the rule of the Gond kings of Garha-Mandla. The ruler of Garha-Mandla, Madan Shah, (1138–1157) built a watchtower and a small hilltop fort at Madan Mahal, an area in Jabalpur. In the 1500s, the Gond king, Sangram Shah held Singorgarh fort. Rani Durgawati was a princess of the Chandela Dynasty who was married to Dalpat Shah of the Gond dynasty. She was well aware of the importance of water conservation, and hence she built more than 85 ponds in Jabalpur, mainly in Ranital, Haathital, Madhatal and Hanumantal.

The Gond king, Hriday Shah (1634–1668), moved his court to the Mandla fort. He secured water sources and built irrigation structures. The kingdom was invaded in 1742 by the Maratha peshwa (prime minister), Balaji Baji Rao along with Visaji Chandorkar, the Maratha governor of Sagar, and made a tributary state of the Maratha Empire.

=== Maratha rule ===
The Maratha rulers of Sagar finally annexed the weakened Garha Kingdom in 1781. Around 1798, the Maratha Peshwa gave the Nerbuddah valley to the Bhonsle kings of Nagpur, who ruled the area until 1818, when it was seized by the British East India Company after the Battle of Sitabuldi.

=== British rule ===
The British made Jabalpur the commission headquarters of the Narmada territories and established a cantonment here. Under the British Raj, Jabalpur became the capital of the Saugor and Nerbudda Territories, which was part of the British North-Western Province. The Saugor and Nerbudda Territories became part of the new Central Provinces in 1861 which in 1903 became the Central Provinces and Berar. By the early 20th Century Jabalpur was the headquarters of a brigade in the 5th division of the Southern Army.

A significant event was the Tripuri Congress session in 1939, led by Subhash Chandra Bose. Under the guidance of Lokmanya Tilak, the Flag Satyagraha was successfully launched. Mahatma Gandhi visited Jabalpur four times.

The Congress session in 1939, held at Tripuri near Jabalpur in present day Madhya Pradesh, became one of the most consequential moments in the history of the Indian national movement. The session took place at Tilwaraghat on the banks of the Narmada River and is remembered primarily for the re election of Subhas Chandra Bose as president of the Indian National Congress, despite opposition from Mahatma Gandhi and the Congress high command.

Bose defeated Pattabhi Sitaramayya, the candidate backed by Gandhi, highlighting deep ideological divisions within the Congress. While Gandhi and his supporters favored a more cautious and non confrontational approach, Bose argued for a more assertive strategy to achieve independence at the earliest. These differences dominated debates during the Tripuri session and strained relations between Bose and the Congress leadership.

The conflict did not end with the election. Continued resistance from senior leaders and the Working Committee made it difficult for Bose to function effectively as president. The tensions that surfaced at Tripuri ultimately led to Bose’s resignation in April 1939, marking a turning point that reshaped both his political path and the broader direction of the freedom movement.

A memorial gate, Kamania Gate, was built in the city to commemorate these events.

After India's independence in 1947, the Central Provinces and Berar became the state of Madhya Pradesh.

Under British rule, and among others in the works of Kipling, the city name was spelled Jubbulpore.

The city's institutional buildings still showcase the British colonial architecture.

== Geography ==
=== Climate ===
Jabalpur

Climate chart (precipitation, max. and min. temperature)
J	F	M	A	M	J	J	A	S	O	N	D
19 24 8	16 28 11	16 34 16	5 39 21	11 42 26	169 38 26	382 31 24	458 29 23	188 31 23	39 32 19	12 29 12	11 25 9
- █ Average max. and min. temperatures in °C
- █ Precipitation totals in mm
- Source: IMD
Imperial conversion
J	F	M	A	M	J	J	A	S	O	N	D
0.7 75 46	0.6 82 52	0.6 93 61	0.2 102 70	0.4 108 79	6.7 100 79	15 88 75	18 84 73	7.4 88 73	1.5 90 66	0.5 84 54	0.4 77 48
- █ Average max. and min. temperatures in °F
- █ Precipitation totals in inches

Jabalpur has a humid subtropical climate typical of north-central India (Madhya Pradesh and southern Uttar Pradesh). Summer begins in late March, lasting until June. May is the hottest month, with an average temperature exceeding 40 °C (104 °F). Summer is followed by the southwest monsoon, which lasts until early October and produces 889 mm (35 in) of rain from July to September. The average annual precipitation is nearly 1,386 mm (54.6 in). The Winter begins in late November and lasts until early March. January is the coldest month, with an average daily temperature near 15 °C (59 °F).

Climate data for Jabalpur Airport (1991–2020, extremes 1901–present)
Month	Jan	Feb	Mar	Apr	May	Jun	Jul	Aug	Sep	Oct	Nov	Dec	Year
Record high °C (°F)	33.4 (92.1)	37.6 (99.7)	41.2 (106.2)	45.4 (113.7)	46.7 (116.1)	46.8 (116.2)	41.7 (107.1)	37.8 (100.0)	37.4 (99.3)	37.9 (100.2)	35.8 (96.4)	33.2 (91.8)	46.7 (116.1)
Mean daily maximum °C (°F)	24.3 (75.7)	27.9 (82.2)	33.3 (91.9)	38.5 (101.3)	41.3 (106.3)	37.6 (99.7)	31.3 (88.3)	29.9 (85.8)	31.3 (88.3)	31.8 (89.2)	29.1 (84.4)	25.8 (78.4)	31.8 (89.2)
Daily mean °C (°F)	17.1 (62.8)	20.7 (69.3)	25.9 (78.6)	31.0 (87.8)	34.6 (94.3)	31.8 (89.2)	27.4 (81.3)	26.6 (79.9)	27.3 (81.1)	25.9 (78.6)	21.9 (71.4)	18.0 (64.4)	25.7 (78.2)
Mean daily minimum °C (°F)	10.7 (51.3)	13.6 (56.5)	18.2 (64.8)	23.3 (73.9)	27.4 (81.3)	27.0 (80.6)	24.7 (76.5)	24.1 (75.4)	23.7 (74.7)	20.3 (68.5)	15.0 (59.0)	11.0 (51.8)	19.9 (67.8)
Record low °C (°F)	1.1 (34.0)	0.0 (32.0)	3.3 (37.9)	10.6 (51.1)	17.2 (63.0)	19.0 (66.2)	20.6 (69.1)	18.3 (64.9)	16.7 (62.1)	10.5 (50.9)	3.9 (39.0)	0.6 (33.1)	0.0 (32.0)
Average rainfall mm (inches)	17.6 (0.69)	19.7 (0.78)	18.2 (0.72)	6.8 (0.27)	11.9 (0.47)	164.2 (6.46)	429.8 (16.92)	443.0 (17.44)	213.7 (8.41)	30.0 (1.18)	10.0 (0.39)	2.9 (0.11)	1,367.8 (53.85)
Average rainy days	1.4	1.7	1.6	0.8	1.1	7.5	15.6	15.5	9.5	2.0	0.7	0.4	57.7
Average relative humidity (%) (at 17:30 IST)	47	38	27	21	21	49	73	79	69	52	51	49	48
Source 1: India Meteorological Department
Source 2: Tokyo Climate Center (mean temperatures 1991–2020)

Jabalpur has been ranked 2nd best "National Clean Air City" (under Category 1 >10L Population cities) in India according to 'Swachh Vayu Survekshan 2024 Results'

=== Flora and fauna ===
==== Extinct species ====
A species of noasaurid theropod dinosaur named Laevisuchus indicus was discovered near Jabalpur in 1917 by Charles Alfred Matley and described by Friedrich von Huene and Matley in 1932. Another small dinosaur discovered at that time by Friedrich von Huene and described by the team in 1932, named Jubbulpuria tenuis, was categorised as junior synonym of Laevisuchus indicus in 2024.

== Demographics ==
Religions in Jabalpur city
Religion	Percent
Hinduism	79.39%
Islam	15.03%
Jainism	2.26%
Christianity	1.59%
Sikhism	1.05%
Other or not stated†	0.68%
Distribution of religions

Population Growth Since 2011 Census
Year	Population
2011	1,268,848
2012	1,295,000
2013	1,320,000
2014	1,360,000
2015	1,385,000
2016	1,400,000
2017	1,440,000
2018	1,450,000

In the 2011 India census, the Jabalpur city (the area covered by the municipal corporation) recorded a population of 1,081,677. The Jabalpur metropolitan area (urban agglomeration) recorded a population of 1,268,848.

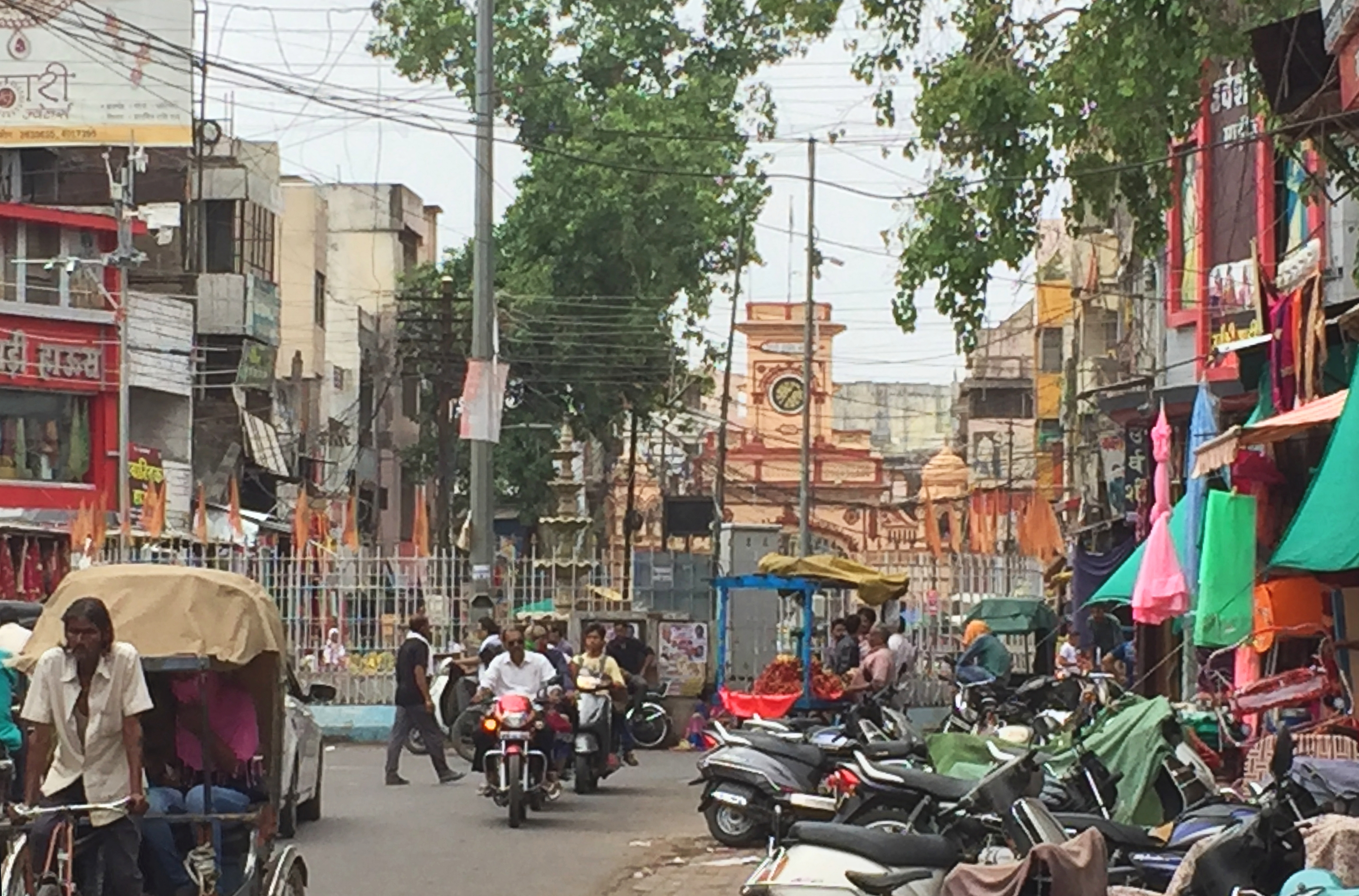
Bada Fuhara and Kamania Gate in the heart of old Jabalpur city

Languages of Jabalpur city (2011)
1. Hindi (89.2%)
2. Urdu (4.27%)
3. Punjabi (1.35%)
4. Marathi (1.33%)
5. Sindhi (1.20%)
6. Others (2.63%)

Hindi is the predominant language in the city. Urdu, Punjabi, Marathi and Sindhi are spoken by small communities in the city.

== Government and public services ==
=== Civic administration ===
Jabalpur covers an area of 263 square kilometres (102 sq mi). The Jabalpur Municipal Corporation (JMC), is charged with governance of the city's civic and infrastructural assets. The corporation has two wings: deliberative and executive. The head of the executive wing is a municipal commissioner who is responsible for the corporation's day-to-day operation and assists the deliberative wing in the decision-making process. The JMC council has one elected representative (corporate) from each ward. Council elections, by popular vote, are held every five years. A corporate from the majority party is selected as mayor.

Jabalpur contributes one member to the Lok Sabha. Ashish Dubey of Bharatiya Janata Party had been elected as the Member of Parliament in the 2024 Lok Sabha election. The city sends eight members to the State Legislative Assembly: four from the city (Jabalpur Purba, Jabalpur Uttar, Jabalpur Cantonment and Jabalpur Paschim) and four from rural areas of the district. Jabalpur is divided into eight zones, each consisting of several wards.

=== Municipal finance ===
According to financial data published on the CityFinance Portal of the Ministry of Housing and Urban Affairs, the Jabalpur Municipal Corporation reported total revenue receipts of ₹618 crore (US$74 million) and total expenditure of ₹569 crore (US$68 million) in 2022–23. Tax revenue accounted for about 21.5% of the total revenue, while the corporation received ₹151 crore in grants during the financial year.

=== Division headquarters ===
Jabalpur is the divisional headquarters for eight districts: Jabalpur, Seoni, Mandla, Chhindwara, Narsinghpur, Katni, Dindori and Balaghat. The district, which was reconstituted on 25 May 1998, has seven tehsils: Jabalpur, Sihora, Patan, Majholi, Shahpura, Panagar and Kundam. The city is the headquarters of the Madhya Pradesh State Electricity Board, the Home-guards and other state and central-government offices.

=== Military establishments ===
The Jabalpur Cantonment is one of the largest cantonments in India. In addition to the ordnance factories, other organisations present in the city include HQ Madhya Bharat Area, the Jammu & Kashmir Rifles Regimental Centre, the Grenadiers Regimental Centre, 1 Signal Training Centre, College of Material Management, Central Ordnance Depot, 506 Army Base Workshop, Military Hospital, HQ Chief Engineer Jabalpur Zone, Military Dairy Farm, and HQ Recruiting Zone. Civilian organisations which are part of the Ministry of Defence are the Cantonment Board, Controller of Defence Accounts, Defence Standardisation Cell and the Canteen Stores Department.

== Economy ==
Vehicle Factory Jabalpur (VFJ)'s Matang truck

=== Agriculture ===
The Narmada River bringing in freshwater from the Vindhya Range has developed Jabalpur district into an agrarian economy. The land of the Narmada basin with its fertile alluvial soil gives good yields of sorghum, wheat, rice, and millet in the villages around Jabalpur. Important among commercial crops are pulses, oilseeds, cotton, sugar cane, and medicinal crops. Kharif crops occupy 60% of total farmland and rabi crops occupy 40% with 71.4% area under food grain production. Nearly 59% of landholders are marginal whereas small farmers share 18% of farmland.

=== Industries ===
Jabalpur has a variety of industries largely based in mineral substances of economic value found in the district, although the ready-made garments industry is a substantial portion of production in Jabalpur.

Defence establishments started in the early 20th century. Jabalpur has Vehicle Factory Jabalpur, Grey Iron Foundry, Gun Carriage Factory Jabalpur and Ordnance Factory Khamaria which belong to the Ordnance Factories Board manufacturing various products for the Indian Armed Forces. The Gun Carriage Factory was started in the year 1904 is well equipped and manufacture gun parts, mounting, shells, and a variety of the other product for war purposes. Vehicle Factory Jabalpur (VFJ) was started as a manufacturer of trucks and other defence vehicles. The other two are Grey Iron Foundry (GIF) and Ordnance Factory Khamaria (OFK).

The city has three regimental centres: Grenadiers, Jammu and Kashmir rifles and the Signals regiment. Jabalpur is also the army headquarters of Madhya Pradesh, Bihar, Chhattisgarh, and Orissa. Jabalpur is an important divisional headquarters, having nine districts: Jabalpur, Seoni, Mandla, Chhindwara, Narsimhapur, Katni, Dindori, Balaghat, and Pandhurna. The Jabalpur District has been reconstituted on 25 May 1998. It now has four tehsils Jabalpur, Sihora, Patan, and Kundam. Jabalpur also has the headquarters of the Madhya Pradesh State Electricity Board, Homeguards, and many other state and central government offices. There are seven blocks in the district with 1449 inhabited villages, 60 uninhabited, 1209 revenue villages, and 4 forest villages. The presence of several industries in Jabalpur bolstered the industrial scenario of the city. However, the industrial growth of the area owes much to the defence establishments and the four ordnance factories.

The presence of the military base and the ordnance factories have improved the infrastructure of the city. This has boosted the industrial development of Jabalpur. The important industries in Jabalpur are:

- Readymade garments units
- Poultry/hatchery
- Electrical goods industry
- Sawmills
- Wood cutting industry
- Industries relating to limestone products
- Building materials
- Glassware
- Telephone parts
- Furniture making industry
- Shaw Wallace Gelatin Factory
- Steel structures works
- Cement industries
- Commercial Engineers & Body Builders Co Limited [CEBBCO ]
- Tobacco business
- Retail business
- Food processing industry
- Vendors for Coca-Cola India & Parle

Jabalpur is home to production facilities of companies such as Jupiter Wagons, KEC International, Sheela Foam, and Udaipur Beverages Ltd.

The nominal GDP of Jabalpur District was estimated at Rs. 42,518 crores for the year 2020–21.

=== Information technology and park ===
M.P. State Electronics Development Corporation Ltd. has set up an I.T. park (Techno Park) in Bargi Hills having total area of 60 acres, 22 km from the Jabalpur airport. Paytm started their operations at Jabalpur in 2018.

== Culture ==
=== Cuisine ===
Local sweets include Doodh ka Halwa, Kalakand, Bhaji Wada, Dal Mangode, Aloo Vada, Khoye ki Jalebi, Mawa-Bati, Khoprapak, Shrikhand, Malpua, Imarti and Makkhanvada. Khoye ki Jalebi, which is quite popular in Madhya Pradesh, was invented by Harprasad Badkul in 1889 at his shop, Badkul Halwai.

== Notable sites ==
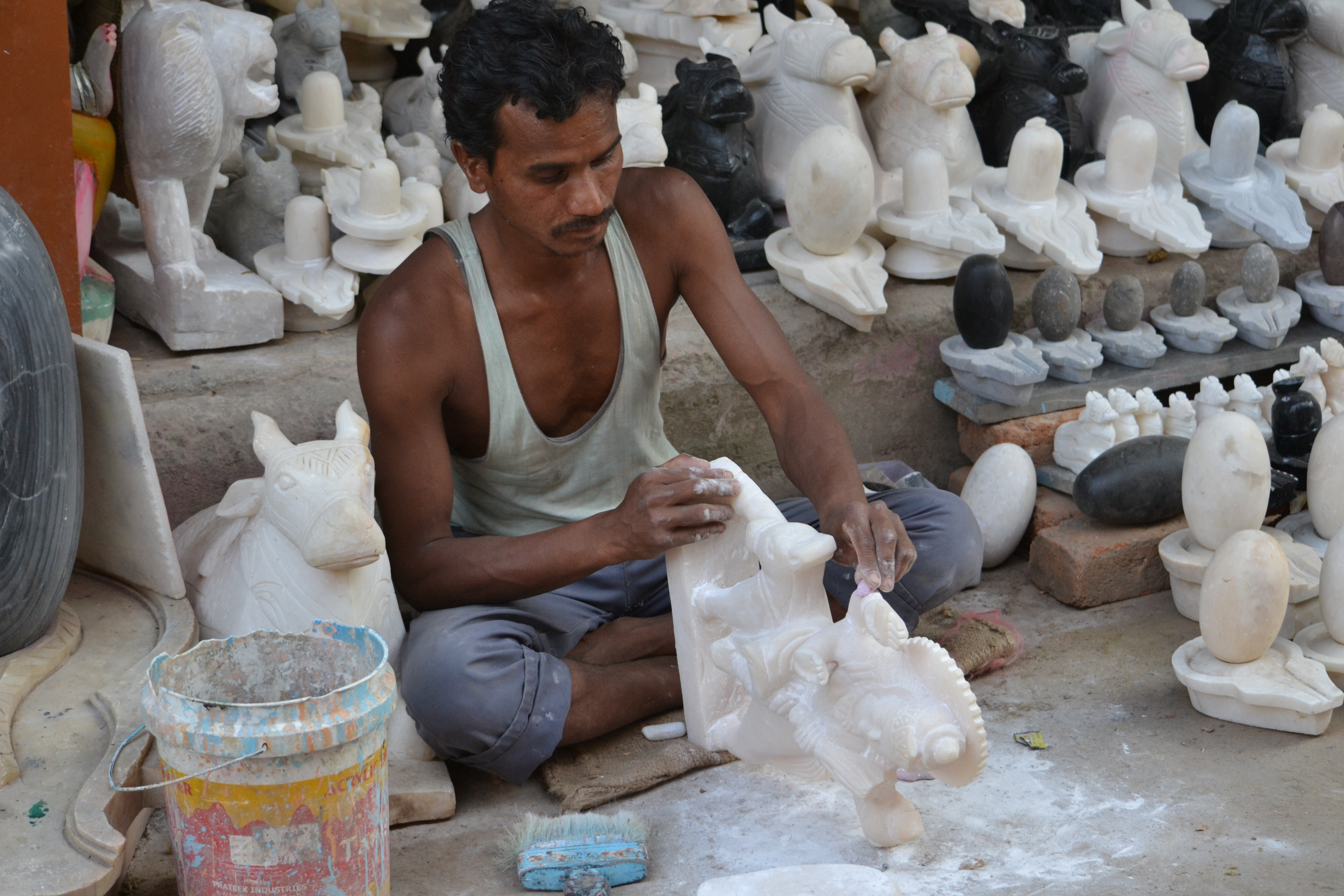
Marble-art

Notable sites include Marble Rocks in Bhedaghat, Hanumantal Bada Jain Mandir, Madan Mahal, Dhuandhar Falls, Chausath-Yogini, Gwarighat, the balancing rock near Madan Mahal Fort and the Shiv Statue at Kachnar City.

The world-renowned tiger reserves like Kanha National Park, Bandhavgarh National Park, Panna National Park, and Pench National Park can be easily visited via Jabalpur. The largest wildlife sanctuary by area, Nauradehi Wildlife Sanctuary is close to Jabalpur and can be easily visited. The recently notified Veerangana Durgavati Tiger Reserve, 7th tiger reserve in Madhya Pradesh also lies in close vicinity to Jabalpur.

Hanumantal Bada Jain Mandir is a 17th-century Jain temple that appears like a fortress with numerous shikharas. The temple has 22 shrines (vedis), making it the largest independent Jain temple in India.

Madan Mahal is a fort built by the Gond king Madan Shahi in 1116 which is situated atop a hill in Jabalpur.

Kachnar city is known for a 23-metre-high (76 ft) Shiva statue housing a cavern with replicas of Shiva lingas from 12 shrines nationwide. The city also houses the Rangawati Museum which was built in 1964 to commemorate Rani Durgavati. The museum also hosts ancient relics, sculptures and a collection of items related to Mahatma Gandhi.

Dumna Nature Reserve Park is an ecotourism site located near Jabalpur Airport. It houses Khandari Dam, a source of drinking water to the city.

The Tilwadeshwar temple is located near the Tilwara Ghat and it is also the place where Gandhi's ashes were immersed.

Other tourist destinations near the city include Paat Baba Mandir, Gupteshwar Mandir, Bhadbhada falls, Gughra Fall, Osho Amritdham, Pisanhari Ki Madiya which is a historic Jain pilgrimage near Netaji Subhash Chandra Bose Medical College, and Nandishwardeep Jain temple.

Maharishi Mahesh Yogi's ashram in Karondi village is located about 90 kms from the city. Lying on the Tropic of Cancer, the location is claimed to be the geographical central point of India by Yogi.

== Transport ==
=== Air ===
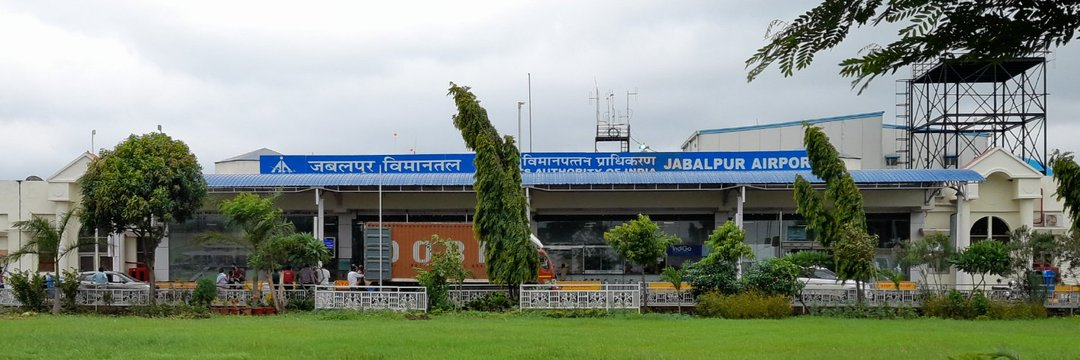
Jabalpur Airport Terminal Building

The Jabalpur Airport (JLR), also known as Dumna Airport, is about 20 kilometres (12 mi) away from the city center. It is located near the Dumna Nature Reserve. It serves as the only airport in the eastern Madhya Pradesh also serving the districts of Narsinghpur, Chhindwara , Sagar, Damoh, Katni, Mandla, Balaghat, Seoni, Umaria, Anuppur, Shahdol, Satna, Rewa. It is also the most convenient airport for visiting National Parks and Wildlife Sanctuaries which surround the city of Jabalpur. The airport has direct connectivity with major cities of New Delhi, Mumbai, Bangalore, Hyderabad, Indore and Bilaspur. Alliance Air, IndiGo and SpiceJet operate from here.

=== Rail ===
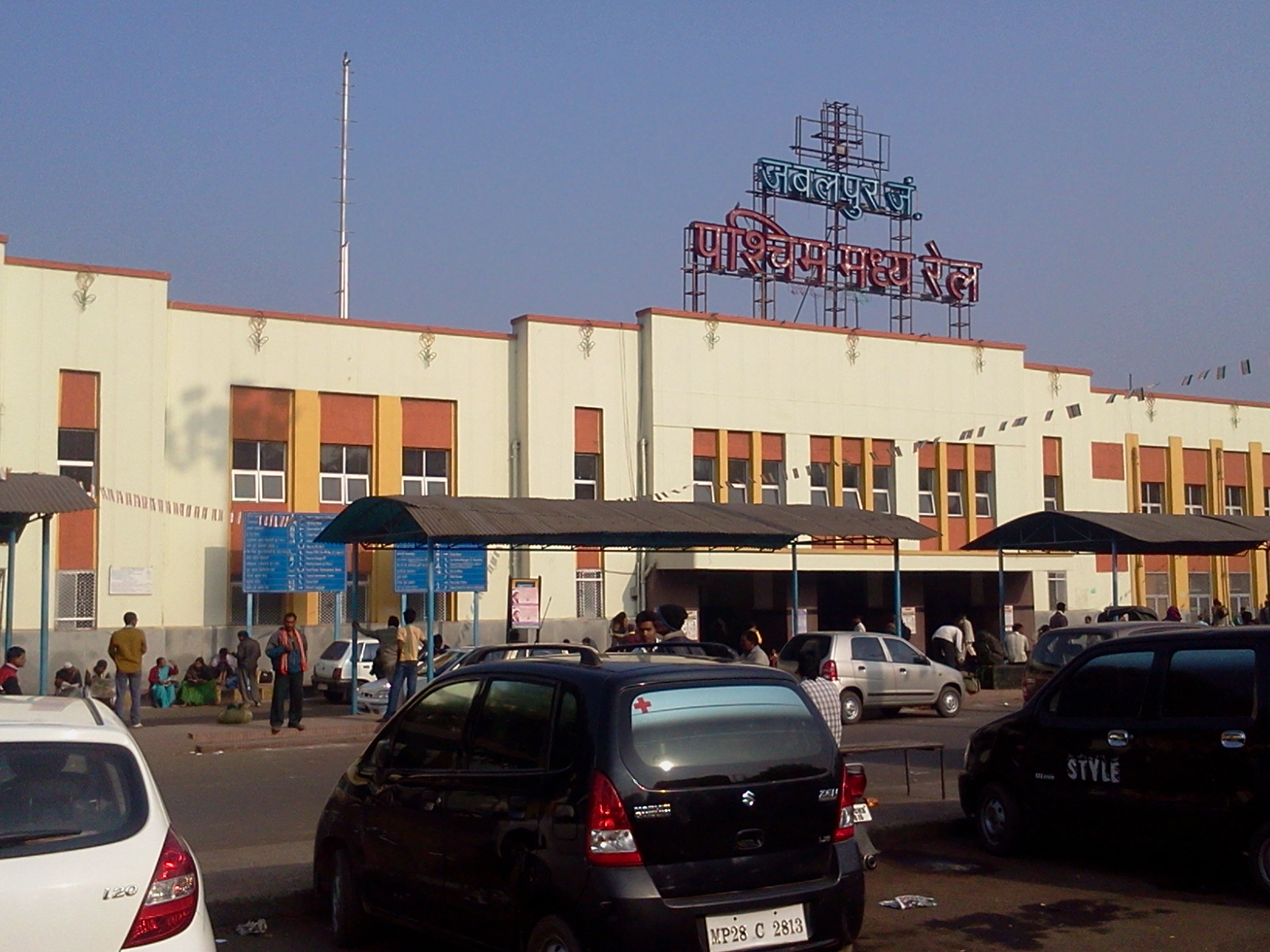
Railway Station

Jabalpur Junction railway station, is one of the five major railway stations located in the city. Madan Mahal railway station is located in the heart of Jabalpur City.

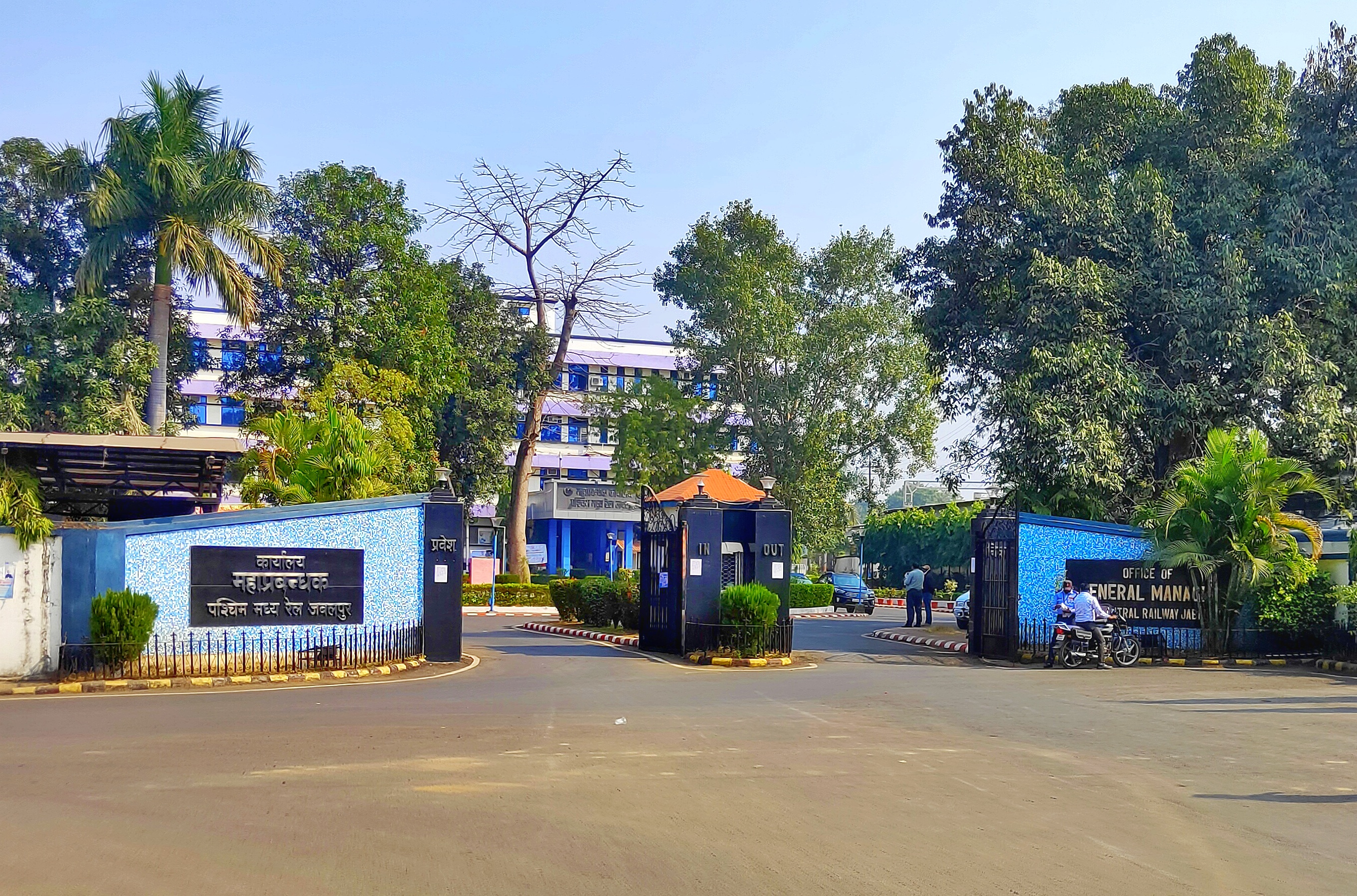
Office of the General Manager, West Central Railway, Jabalpur

Jabalpur city homes the Zonal Headquarters of West Central Railways (WCR). Jabalpur is also one of the three divisional headquarters in WCR. The boundaries of divisional headquarters extend up to Itarsi Junction in the south-west, Bina Junction station in the north, Manikpur Junction and Rewa station in the North East and Singrauli station in the east. All these railway lines are broad gauge lines. A narrow-gauge line existed between Jabalpur to Gondia station which has presently been converted to broad gauge. Now this line provides direct connectivity to Nagpur Junction railway station and Raipur Junction railway station, via Gondia Junction.

Jabalpur Junction is well connected with Rail and has dedicated trains to New Delhi, Mumbai, Kolkata, Lucknow, SVDK Katra, Ajmer, Somnath, Pune, Bangalore, Coimbatore etc.

=== Road ===
Jabalpur has excellent road connectivity. NH-45 connects it to Bhopal, NH-30 connects it to Varanasi and Mandla, and NH-44 connects it to Nagpur. Apart from this, Jabalpur also has a good network of state highways.

The Jabalpur Outer Ring Road is an under-construction 114 km (71 mi) corridor being developed to divert long-distance and heavy traffic away from Jabalpur. With a cost of ₹3,540 crore (US$370 million), it will be the second-longest ring road in India after Hyderabad's ORR. The longest elevated corridor of Madhya Pradesh is also present in Jabalpur City which is nearing completion. This will be one of the longest elevated roads in India.

== Education ==
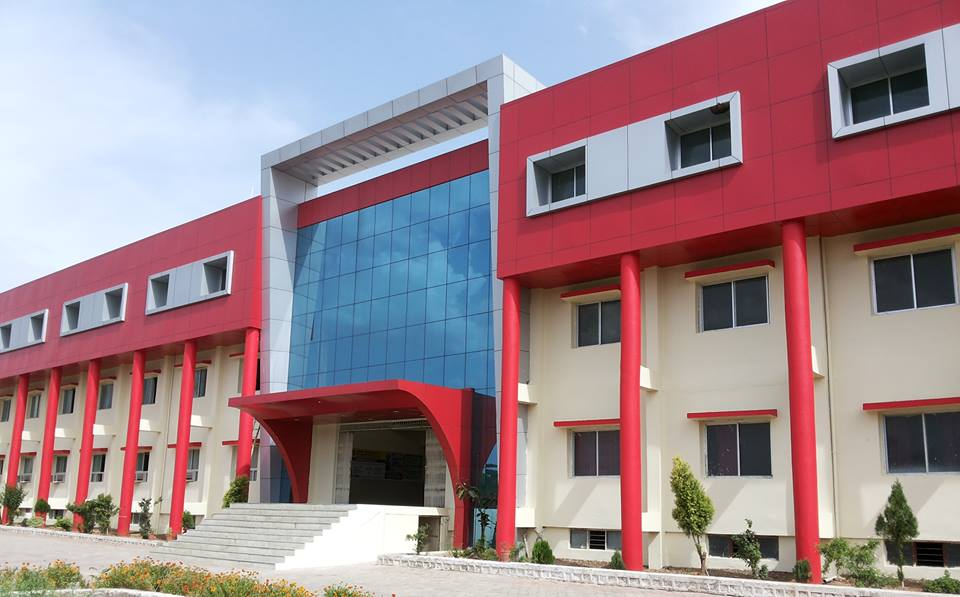
LNCT Jabalpur

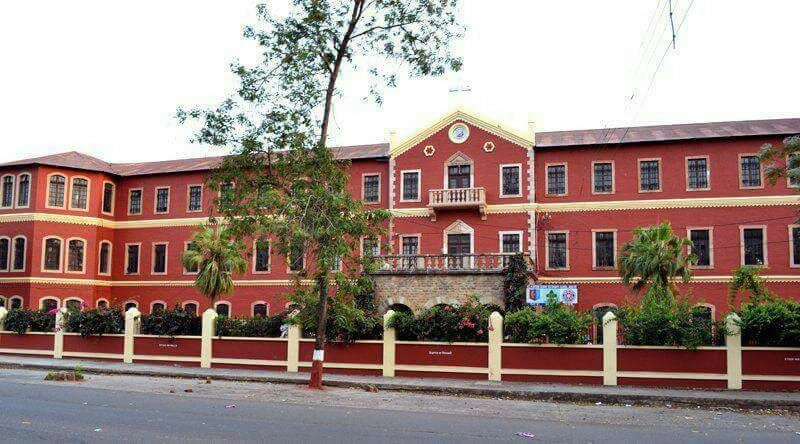
St. Aloysius Senior Secondary School, established in the year 1868, is among the oldest schools in India

Jabalpur became a centre of higher education by the end of the 19th century, with institutions such as the Hitkarini Sabha, established by local citizens in 1868, and Robertson College (now bifurcated into the Government Science College, Jabalpur, and Mahakoshal Arts & Commerce College) was established in Sagar in 1836 and moved to Jabalpur in 1873. Government Engineering College, Jabalpur was the first technical institution in Central India to be established by the British. IIITDM Jabalpur was founded in 2005. Scholars, authors and politicians such as Ravishankar Shukla, Rajneesh, Maharishi Mahesh Yogi and Gajanan Madhav Muktibodh had been in Jabalpur for some time in their life. Gyan Ganga Institute of Technology & Sciences, established in 2003, is an autonomous private engineering institute in Jabalpur.

Jabalpur is known for many universities such as Rani Durgavati University (also called the University of Jabalpur), Madhya Pradesh Medical Science University, Nanaji Deshmukh Veterinary Science University and Dharmashastra National Law University, Jabalpur, Indian Council of Medical Research-NIRTH. Other institutions like Tropical Forest Research Institute is based in Jabalpur.

Jabalpur also hosts a government medical college named Netaji Subhash Chandra Bose Medical College.

== Media ==
Several television news channels have branches in the city. Various cable operators operate digital cable TV system in city.

=== Newspapers ===
National and local newspapers are published in Jabalpur in Hindi and English:

Newspaper	Language	Founded
Naiduniya	Hindi	1947
Patrika	Hindi	2009
Nava Bharat	Hindi	1934
Deshbandhu	Hindi	1959
Hari Bhoomi	Hindi	1996
The Times of India	English	1838
Hindustan Times	English	1924
Hindustan	Hindi	
The Hitavada	English	1911
Business Standard	English, Hindi	1975
Dainik Bhaskar	Hindi	1958
Yash Bharat	Hindi	2006

Jabalpur janpaksh hindi 1995

=== Radio ===
Radio stations in Jabalpur include:

Name	Frequency (MHz)	Tagline
Red FM	93.5	Bajaate raho
MY FM	94.3	Jiyo Dil Se!
Radio Mirchi	98.3	It's Hot!
Radio Orange	106.4	Kuch Khatta Kuch Meetha
Akashvani	102.9	

Akashvani Jabalpur broadcasts on 801 kHz AM with a 200 kW transmitter.

== Sports ==
The city has two stadiums: Ravishankar Shukla Stadium and Rani Tal Stadium. Madhya Pradesh Cricket Association Ground of MPSA is also located in Jabalpur where Ranji Trophy was held in 2012. It is generally accepted that while serving at Jabalpur in 1875, Colonel Sir Neville Chamberlain developed a new variation of black pool by introducing coloured balls into the game in the British Army officer's mess. This game was later dubbed snooker.

== Notable people and residents ==
Historical personalities

- Amedee Delalex (1826–1889)
- Rani Durgavati (1524–1564)
- Gokuldas Malpani (1839 – 1909)
- Abani Mukherji (1891–1937)

Movie and TV personalities

- Tom Alter
- Jaya Bachchan
- Jennifer Mistry Bansiwal
- Shaleen Bhanot
- Gurmeet Choudhary
- Pragya Jaiswal
- Kirron Kher
- Prem Nath
- Arjun Rampal
- Shalini Pandey
- Ashutosh Rana
- Pradeep Rawat
- Sharat Saxena
- Aadesh Shrivastava
- Raghubir Yadav

Armed forces officers

- Maj Gen G. D. Bakshi
- Admiral Jal Cursetji
- Lt Gen WAG Pinto

Civil servants and people holding high public office

- C. B. Bhave, IAS
- Sudhir Kumar Mishra
- S Prakash Tiwari

Politicians

- Frank Anthony
- Lakhan Ghanghoriya
- Ashok Rohani
- Ishwardas Rohani
- Rakesh Singh
- K. S. Sudarshan
- Vivek Tankha
- Captain B P Tiwari
- Shreegopal Vyas
- Sharad Yadav

Business

- Siddhartha Paul Tiwari
- Ajai Chowdhry
- Shyam Mardikar

Spiritual gurus

- Mahant Swami Maharaj
- Osho Rajneesh
- Maharshi Mahesh Yogi

Journalists

- Arnab Goswami
- Mazher Jabalpuri

Engineers

- S. P. Chakravarti

Doctors

- Yogesh Kumar Chawla
- Pradeep Chowbey
- Narmada Prasad Gupta
- Pukhraj Bafna
- Shashi Wadhwa

Authors and poets

- Subhadra Kumari Chauhan
- Kamta Prasad Guru
- Harishankar Parsai
- Nell St. John Montague
- Ram Kinkar Upadhyay

Sportspersons

- Madhu Yadav

== See also ==
- Jubbulpuria
- Jabalpur district
- Indian Ordnance Factories
- Tropical Forest Research Institute
- Largest Indian cities by GDP

== Gallery ==
Durga idol of hitkarini Dham-Jabalpur in Navratri 2025

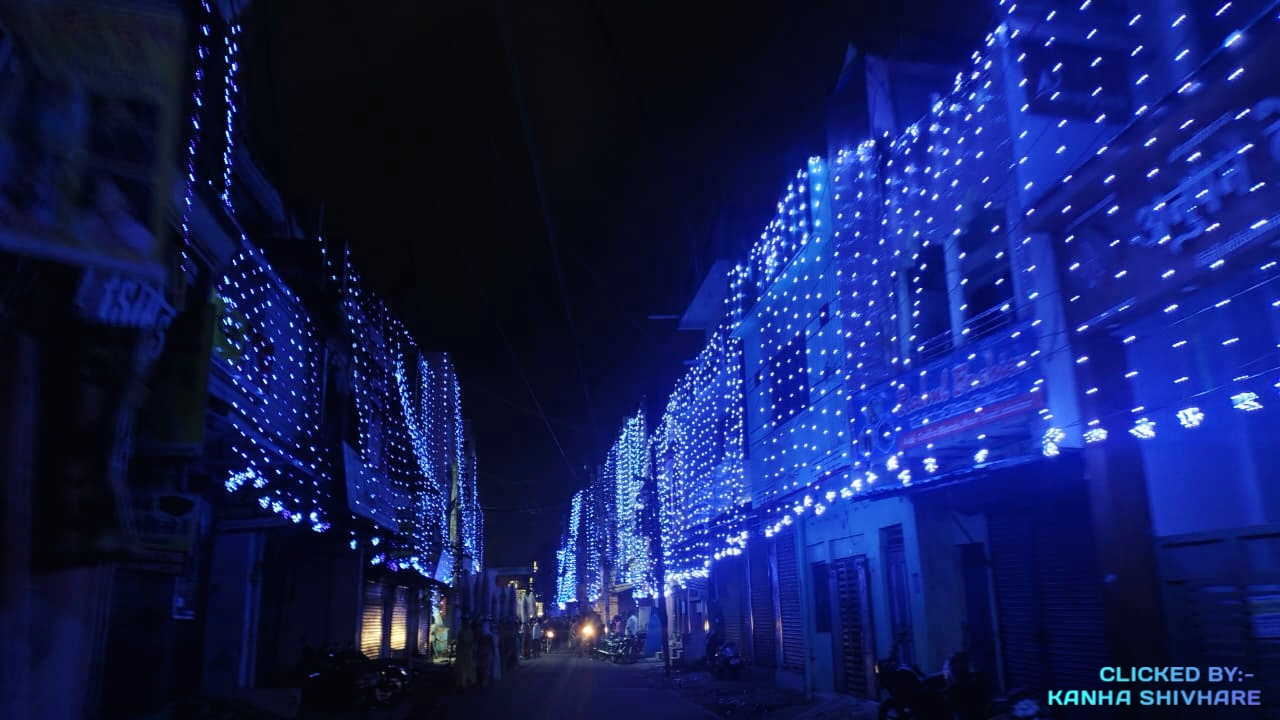
Night view of Jabalpur during Navratri

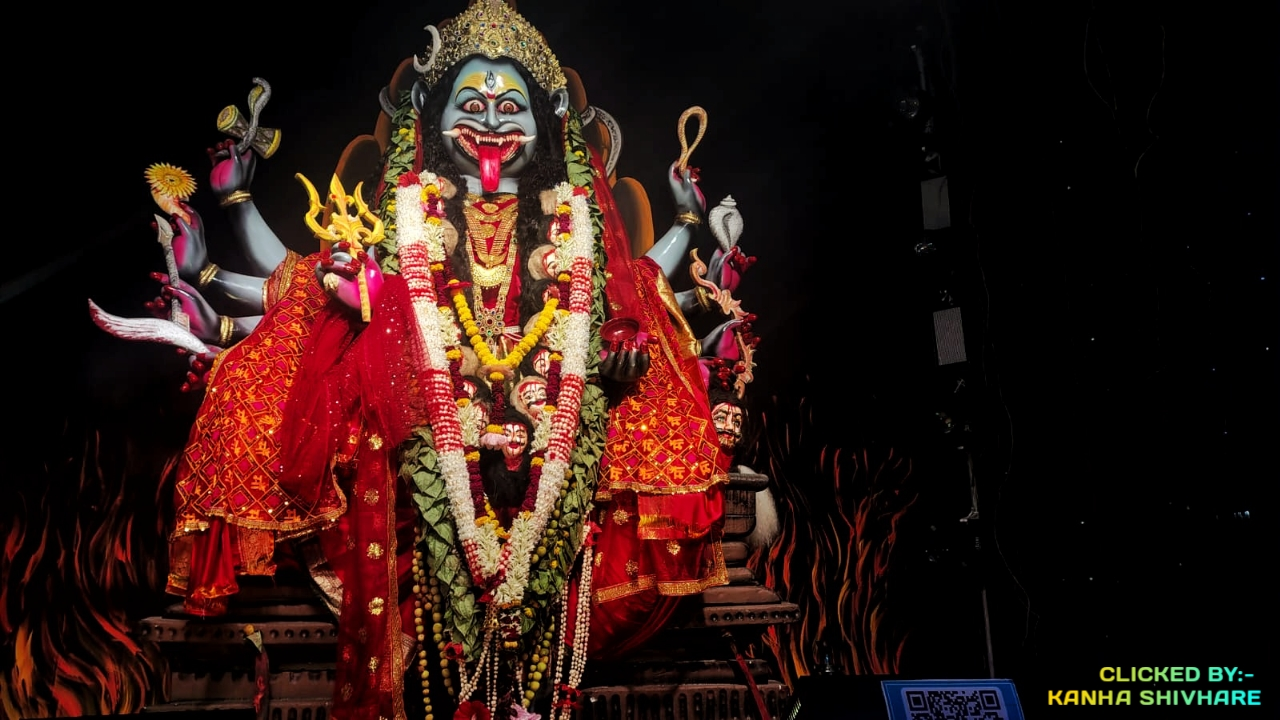
Devi pratyangira at jabalpur - kotwali during Navratri

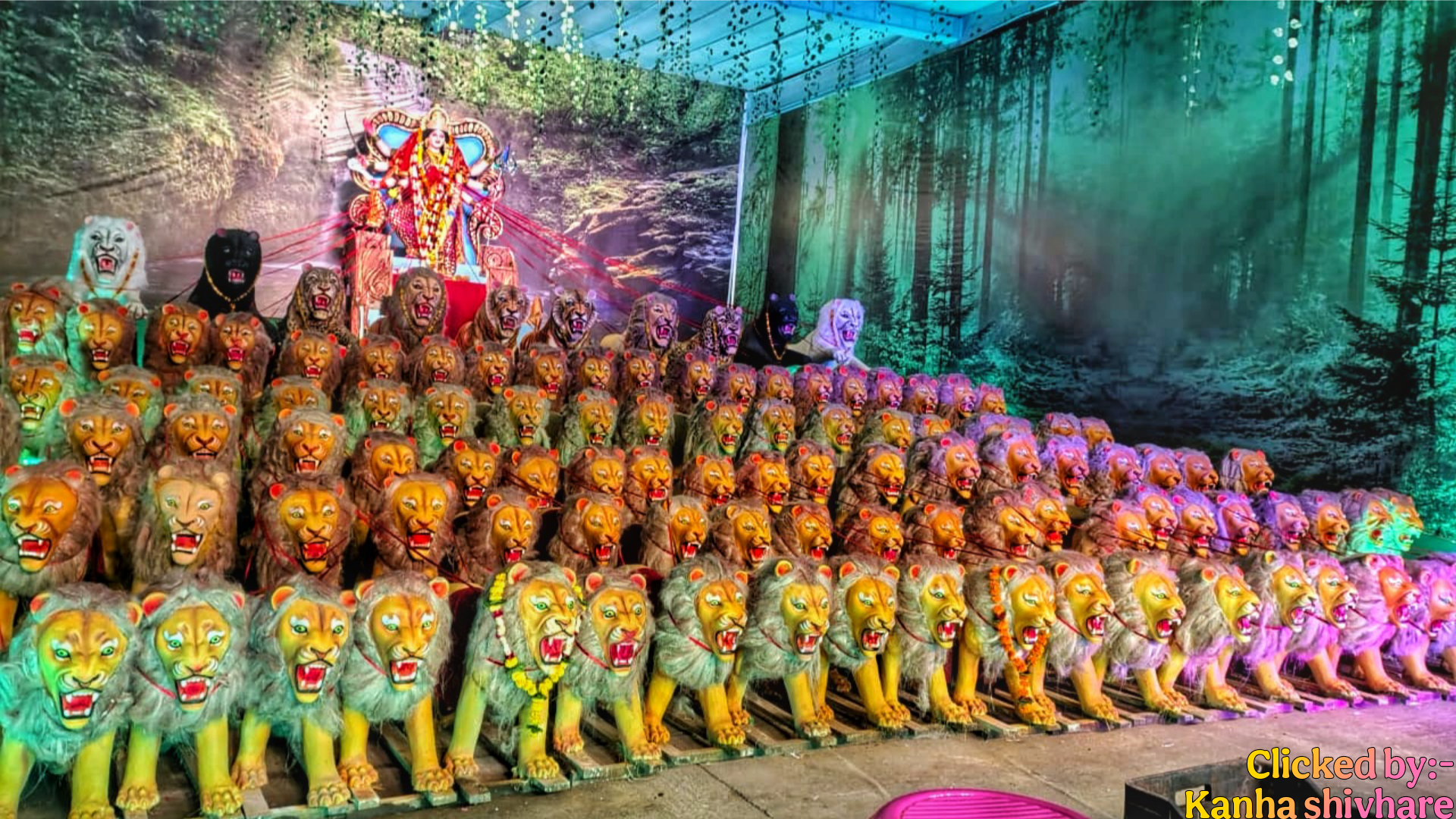
Idol of Durga with 151 tigers near madan Mahal station jabalpur, madhya pradesh during Navratri

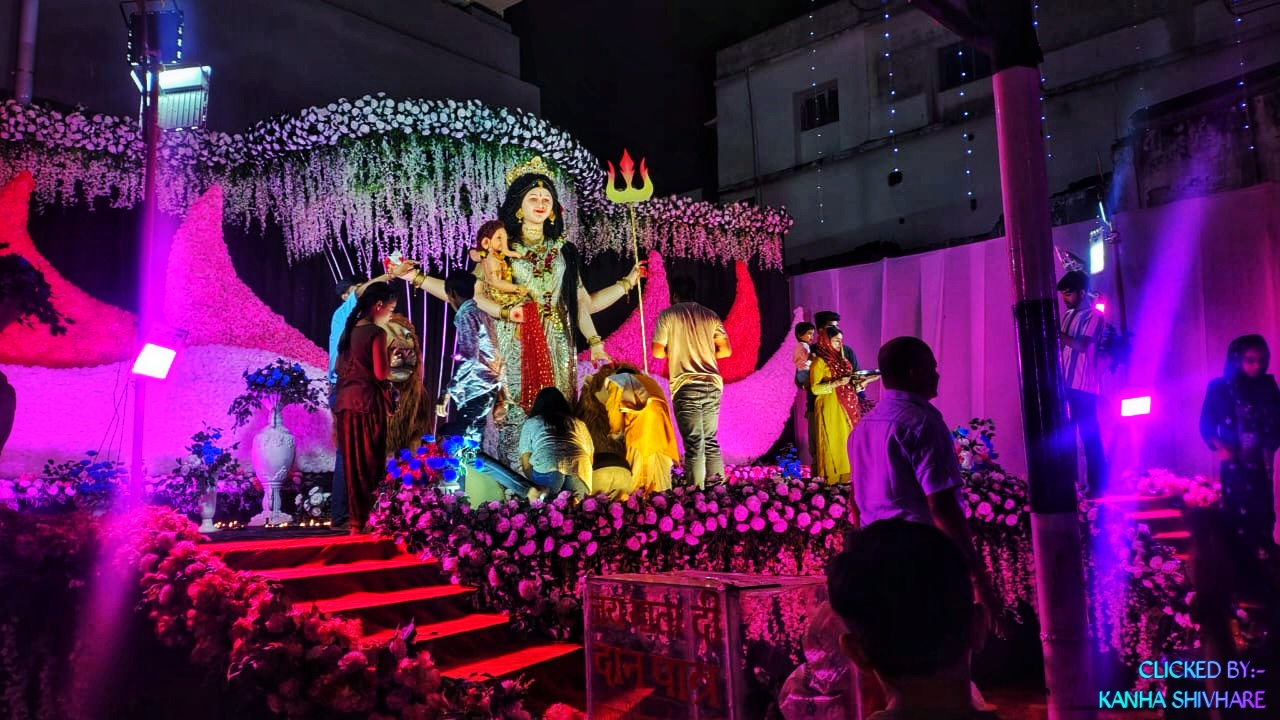
Goddess Durga idol at near madan Mahal, jabalpur during Navratri 2025

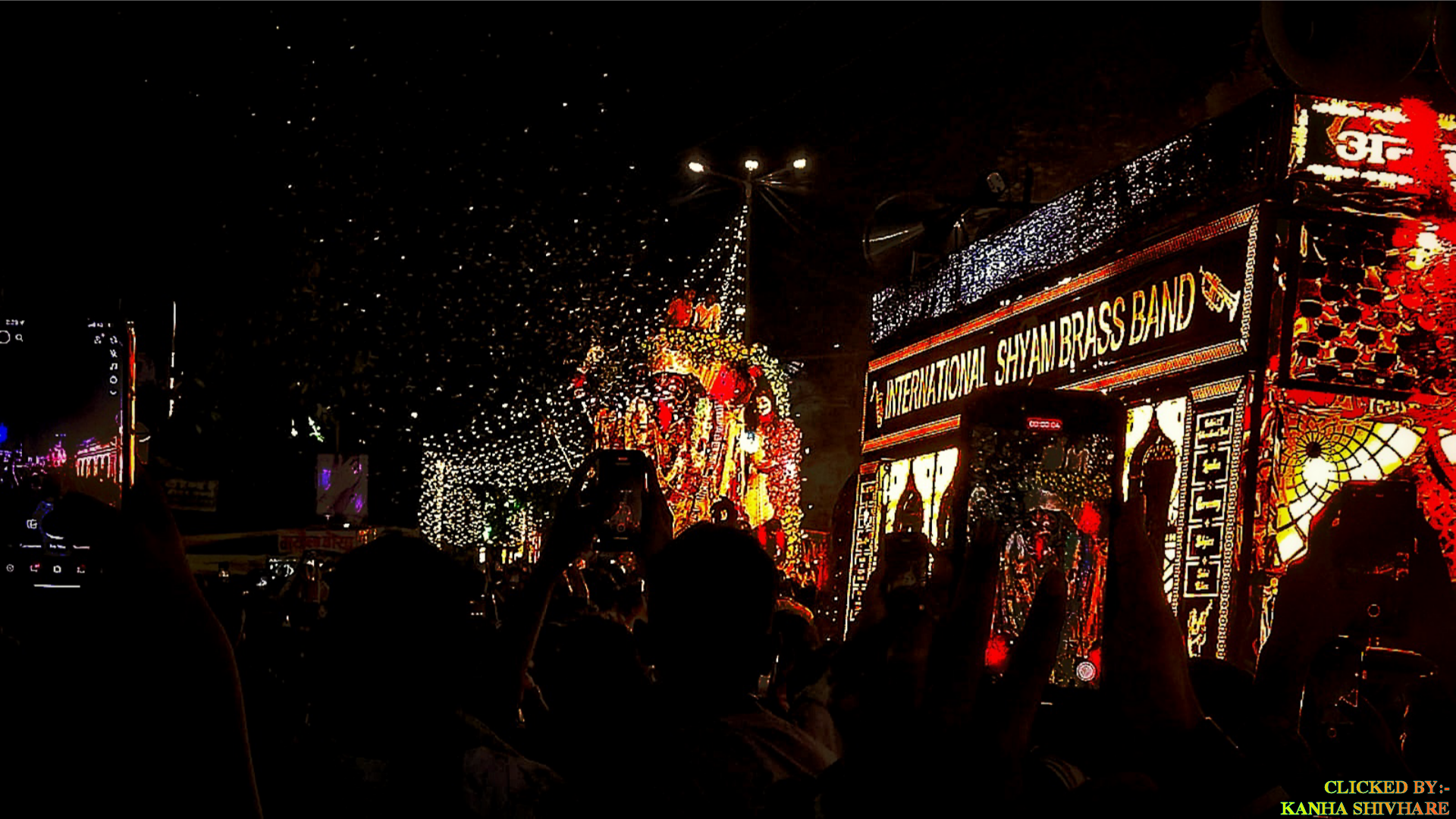
Garha fatak Jabalpur Mahakali idol(of Navratri) during dussehra chal samaroh

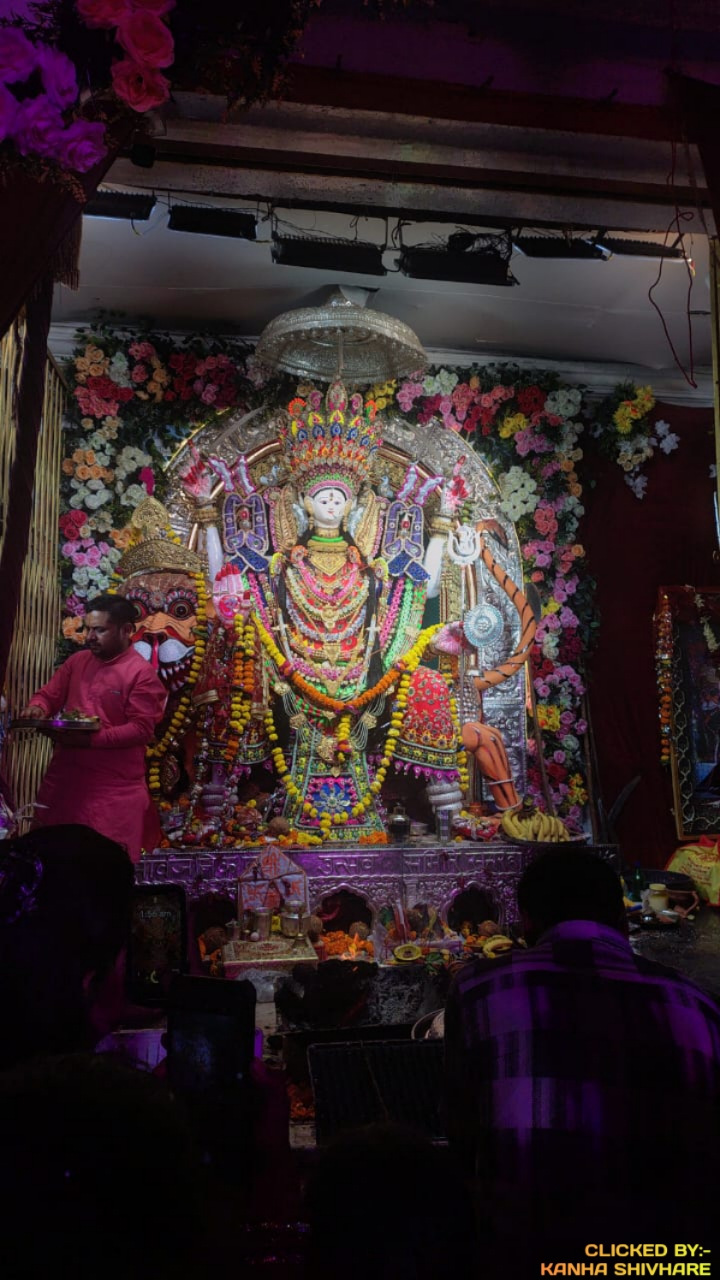
Sunarhai mata(also known as nagar sethani)- jabalpur from Navaratri 2025
