= Narmada Prasad Gupta =

Indian urologist

- Born: India
- Education: NSCB Medical College
- Occupation: Urologist
- Known for: URobotic surgery
- Awards: Padma Shri; USI Certificate of Commendation for Excellence; IKDRC Distinguished Teacher Award; USI President's Gold Medal; Dr. B. C. Roy Award; IMA Eminent Men for Distinguished Achievement of Highest Order; USI Urology Gold Medal; Ranbaxy Research Award; USI Lifetime Achievement Award
- Website: www.urologist.co.in

Narmada Prasad Gupta is an Indian urologist, medical researcher, writer and the chairman of Academics and Research Division Urology at the Medanta, the Medicity, New Delhi. He is credited with over 10,000 urological surgical procedures and the highest number of urology robotics (URobotic) surgeries in India. He is a former head of the department of urology of the All India Institute of Medical Sciences Delhi and a former president of the Urological Society of India. He received the Dr. B. C. Roy Award, the highest Indian award in the medical category, from the Medical Council of India in 2005. The government of India awarded him the fourth highest civilian honour of the Padma Shri, in 2007, for his contributions to Indian medicine.

== Biography ==
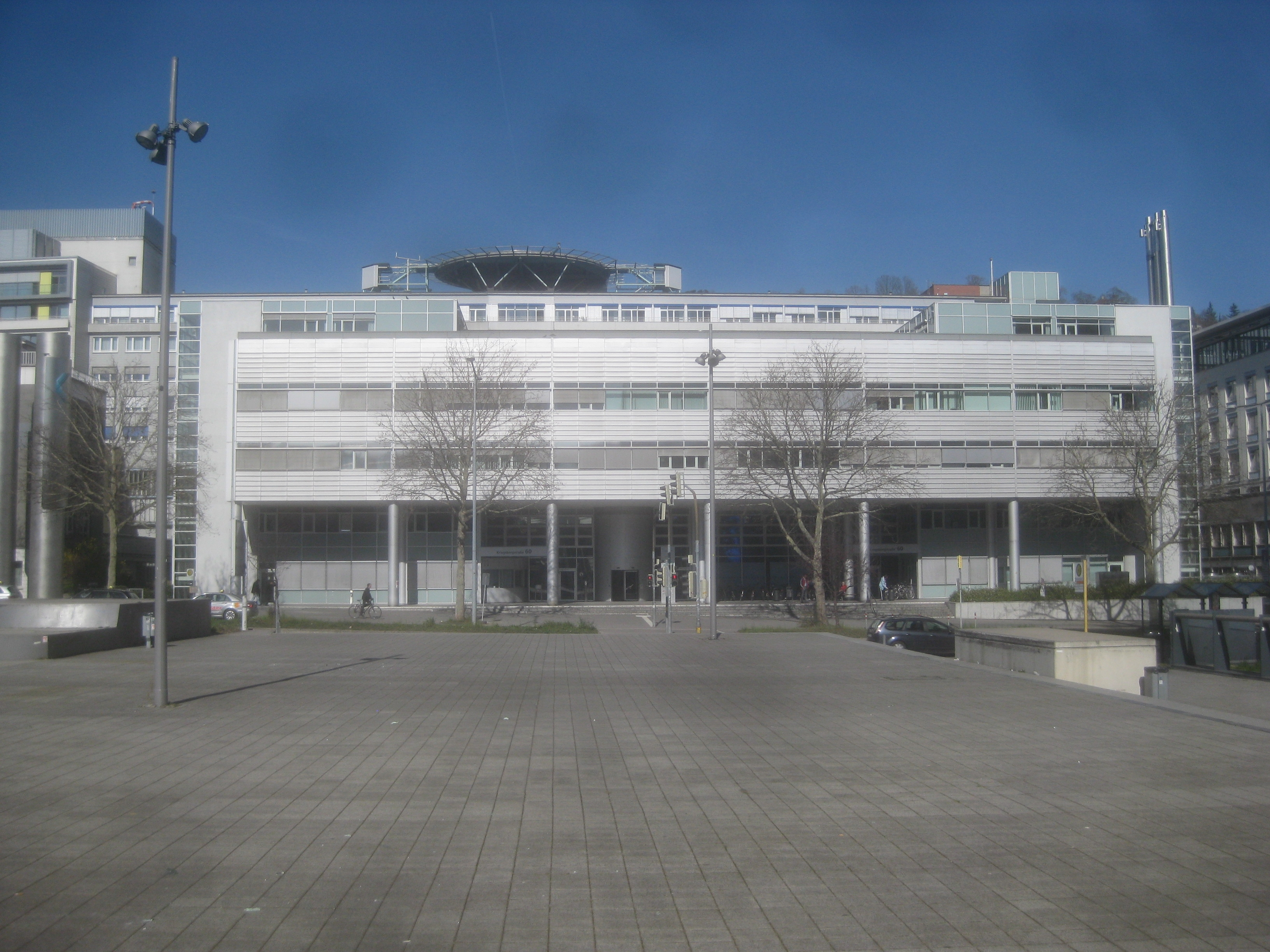
Katharinen Hospital, Stuttgart

Gupta graduated in medicine from Netaji Subhash Chandra Bose Medical College, Jabalpur, when the institution was known as the Government Medical College, in 1970 and continued his higher education there to secure a master's degree in surgery (MS) in 1974. He started his career as a senior resident at the All India Institute of Medical Sciences Delhi (AIIMS) in 1975 and continued at AIIMS until 1978. During this period, he pursued his studies, too, and obtained the degree of MCh in 1977.

Moving to Iran in 1978, he worked as a consultant urologist at Shah Ismail Hospital at Ardabil for a year and returned to India and to AIIMS to join the institution as a member of faculty in 1979. He served the institution in various positions such as assistant professor (1984–1985), associate professor (1986–1989), additional professor (1989–1996) and professor (1996–1998) and retired from AIIMS service as the Head of the Department of Urology in March 2010. In between, he was a visiting urologist at Katharinenhospital Stuttgart from April to June in 1986. After his superannuation, he joined Medanta the Medicity and is the incumbent chair at the Academics and Research Division, Urology of the medical institution.

Gupta is reported to have performed over 10,000 urological surgical procedures, including urobotic procedures, and is known to have performed the highest number of such procedures by a urologist in India. He has been engaged in research in the discipline and has published over 300 articles and six text books, including Robotic Radical Prostatectomy, All About Prostate Gland, Prostate Cancer Patient's Perspective and Challenging and Rare Cases in Urology, a practical guide for aspiring urological surgeons. He has also contributed chapters to nine medical reference books and has been a contributor towards the making of 18 educational videos. He is a former president of the Urological Society of India (2006–07) where he is a life member and was involved with Societé Internationale d'Urologie, as a national delegate and member. He is a life member of such organizations as Urolithiasis Society of India, Association of Surgeons of India, Geriatric Society of India, Indian Medical Association, Indian Society of Organ Transplantation, Indian Society of Oncology and Indian Endoscopy Society, an international member of the American Urological Association, and a member of the Society of Endourology and SWL. Around 110 MCh students have been reported to have received training under Gupta.

== Awards and honours ==
The National Academy of Medical Sciences (NAMS) elected Gupta as a fellow in 1998. He has delivered several award lectures including the D. K. Roy Chowdhary Oration Award of the Indian Medical Association (1990), Dr. Pinnamaneni Venkateswara Rao Endowment Lecture Award and the Dr. Himadari Sarkar Memorial Oration (2008–2009) of the Urological Society of India (1998), Col. Sangham Lal Memorial Oration of the National Academy of Medical Sciences (2002), Dr. S. K. Sen Memorial Oration and the Golden Jubilee Oration (2007) of the Delhi chapter of the Association of Surgeons of India (2002) and Dr. B. N. Oration of the Society of Surgeons of Nepal (2006). He also received the Certificate of Commendation for Excellence of the Urological Society of India in 1987 and the International Scholarship from the Cleveland Clinic Foundation, Ohio in 1998.

Gupta received the Distinguished Teacher Award from the Institute of Kidney Diseases and Research Centre (IKDRC), Ahmedabad, in 2000 and the President's Gold Medal of the Urological Society of India in 2003. The Medical Council of India awarded him the Dr. B. C. Roy Award, the highest Indian medical award, in 2005, and he received the fellowship of the UICC ICCRT, the same year. The government of India awarded him the Padma Shri, the fourth highest civilian honour, in 2007, the same year as he received the Eminent Men for Distinguished Achievement of Highest Order from the Indian Medical Association. He received the Urology Gold Medal from the Urological Society of India and the Ranbaxy Research Award in 2009. Rani Durgavati University honoured him with the degree of Doctor of Science (honoris causa) in 2009 and the Urological Society of India awarded him its Lifetime Achievement Award in 2010.

== See also ==
- Computer-assisted surgery
- Minimally-invasive procedures
- Robot-assisted surgery
