= Rani Durgawati Museum =

Museum in Madhya Pradesh, India

- Established: 1976
- Location: Jabalpur, Madhya Pradesh, India
- Coordinates: 23.163°N 79.934°E

Rani Durgawati Museum is a museum in Jabalpur city in Madhya Pradesh state of India. It was established in 1976. It houses a fine collection of sculptures, inscriptions and prehistoric relics. The museum is dedicated to the memory of the Queen Durgavati.
