= Nell St. John Montague =

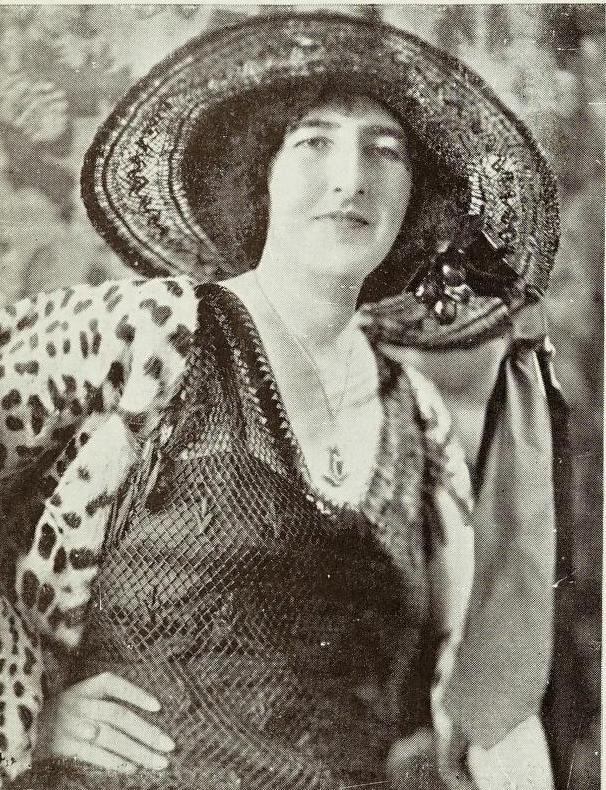
- Nell St. John Montague, from a 1921 publication.
- Born: Eleanor Lilian Helene Lucie-Smith; 27 June 1875; Jabalpur, India
- Died: 23 August 1944 (aged 69); London
- Other names: Nell St. John Montagu, Eleanor Standish-Barry (after marriage)
- Occupations: writer, actress, fortune teller

Nell St. John Montague (27 June 1875 – 23 August 1944) was the pen name of a British actress, writer, socialite and "clairvoyante", born Eleanor Lucie-Smith in India.

== Early life ==
Eleanor Lilian Helene Lucie-Smith was born in Jabalpur, India, to an English father and a Scottish mother. Her father, Major-General Charles Bean Lucie-Smith, was stationed there with the British Army.

== Career ==
Montague wrote The Irish Lead (1916), a play she also directed and acted in, to raise funds for Irish prisoners-of-war. She also starred in An Interrupted Divorce in London, and her own short play, The Barrier. In 1922 she wrote and appeared in a one-act farce, Room 7, on the London stage. She appeared in two silent films, The Glorious Adventure (1922) and A Gipsy Cavalier (1923). She wrote the anti-vivisection short story "The Hallmark of Cain", which was adapted into the short film All Living Things (1939). The film was remade in 1955.

Montague called herself a "clairvoyante", and her fortune telling was popular in society circles. She appeared on very early British television, in 1932, reading palms, and "her performance evoked a volume of mail at Portland Place that would have been gratifying to the producer of a popular revue", according to one report. She was invited to the wedding of Princess Marina of Greece and Denmark in 1934, and brought a crystal ball as a gift. She also tried to use her visions to solve crimes. She kept a pet monkey, and posed with the monkey for portraits, saying it brought good luck. She wrote about her abilities and her predictions in her memoir, Revelations of a Society Clairvoyante (1926), and in The Red Fortune Book (1924). She also wrote a novel, The Poison Trail (1930).

== Personal life ==
Montague married Irish landowner and judge Henry Standish-Barry (1873-1945) in 1899. They had three children, Charles (1900-1918), Marcella (Mercy), and Margaret. Her son died in World War I. She died in 1944, at her home in Harrington Road, Kensington, London, aged 69 years (though reported by the Commonwealth War Graves Commission as 50), in a bombing during World War II. It was widely publicized that she predicted the violent circumstances of her death, when she said "I saw a fiery streak. Then a red mist spread over everything." Her gravesite is in Bishopstone, East Sussex. Her name appears on a memorial plaque commemorating the war dead in Bishopstone.
