= Shashi Wadhwa =

Indian scientist

- Born: 30 July 1948 (age 78)
- Education: Netaji Subhash Chandra Bose Medical College, Jabalpur; All India Institute of Medical Sciences, New Delhi
- Known for: Anatomy and Developmental neuroscience
- Scientific career
- Workplaces: All India Institute of Medical Sciences, New Delhi
- Doctoral advisor: Veena Bijlani

Shashi Wadhwa (born. 20 July 1948) was the dean of All India Institute of Medical Sciences, New Delhi. Her major research interests are developmental neurobiology, quantitative morphology and electron microscopy. Her laboratory mainly focussed on the developing human brain.

== Education ==
Shashi received her graduate degree from NSCB Medical College, Jabalpur in 1970 and then joined the Department of Anatomy at AIIMS for postgraduate studies leading to MS and PhD.

== Career ==
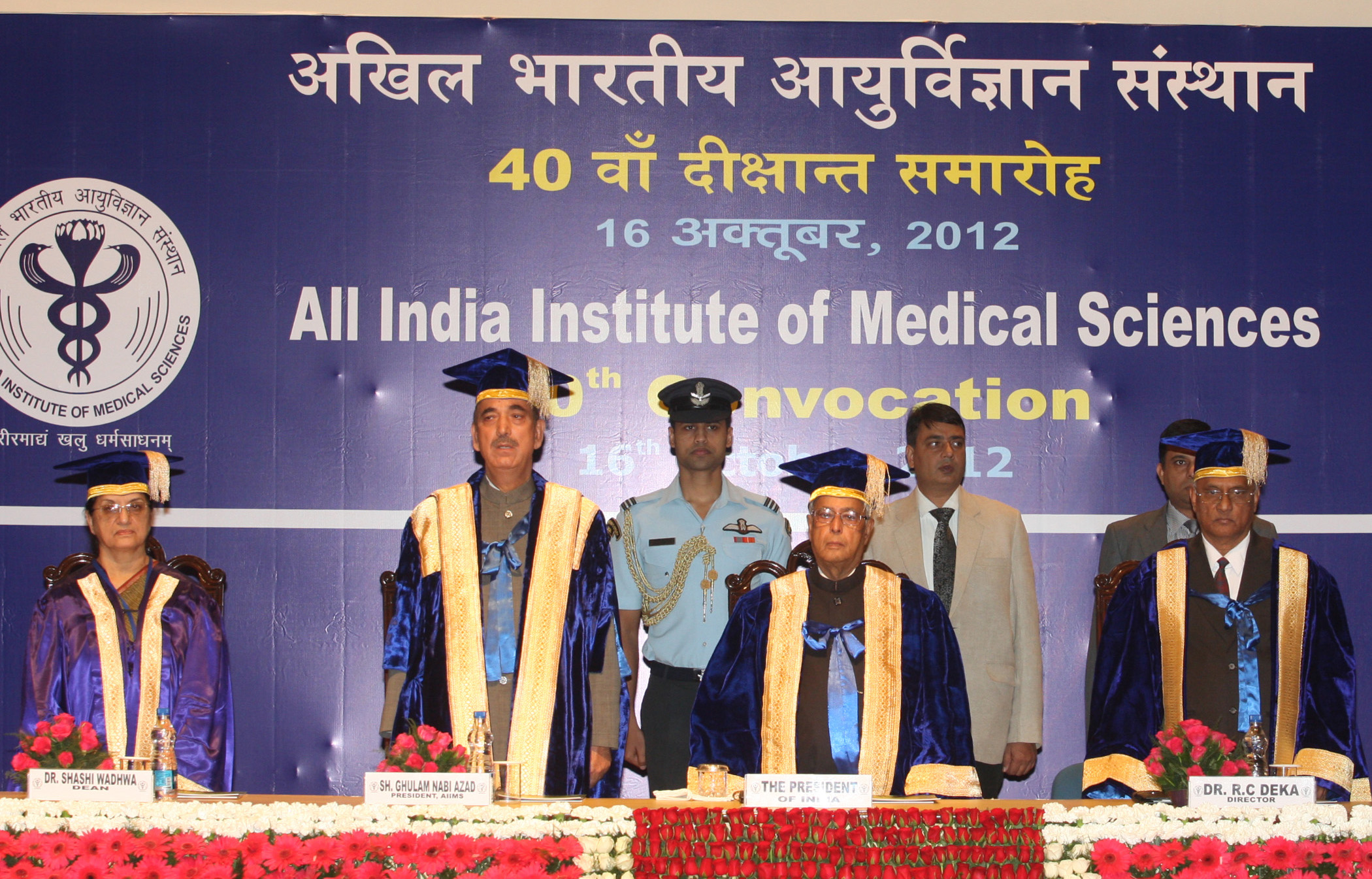
Dr. Shashi Wadhwa at the 40th Annual Convocation of All India Institute of Medical Sciences (AIIMS), in New Delhi on October 16, 2012

Shashi worked till her retirement as Professor and eventually the Dean of the Department of Anatomy. She has taught and trained undergraduates and postgraduates of MSc, MS and PhD since 1972 at AIIMS. She has 67 international and 37 National Research Publications, 27 Chapters in books and has edited/co-edited 13 books and monographs.

== Major research ==
Her major research interests are:

- developmental neurobiology
- quantitative morphology and
- electron microscopy

Her laboratory has mainly focused on the developing human brain. The human spinal cord, visual pathway, cerebellar nuclei and the autonomic innervation of human urinary bladder have been studied to highlight the critical time periods during which these regions are susceptible to alterations in the micro-environment of the fetus that could result in related developmental abnormalities. The studies provided baseline data for comparison with pathological material and animal experiments as well as helped in better understanding of processes involved in the development of these regions at the molecular level.

== Recognition ==
Shashi, an elected fellow of the National Academy of Medical Sciences, has been recognized for her work with many awards and honors. She won the Shanti Swarup Bhatnagar Prize of CSIR in 1990 and the BK Bachhawat Lifetime Achievement Award in 2013.

She holds life memberships with:

- International Brain Research Organization
- Indian Group of International Society for Stereology
- Indian Academy of Neurosciences
- Electron microscopic Society of India
- Delhi Association of Morphological Sciences

She has been a member of the Indian Cancer Society since 1999.
