= Paat Baba Mandir =

Hanuman Temple in Jabalpur

Coordinates: 23°10′21″N 79°58′42″E

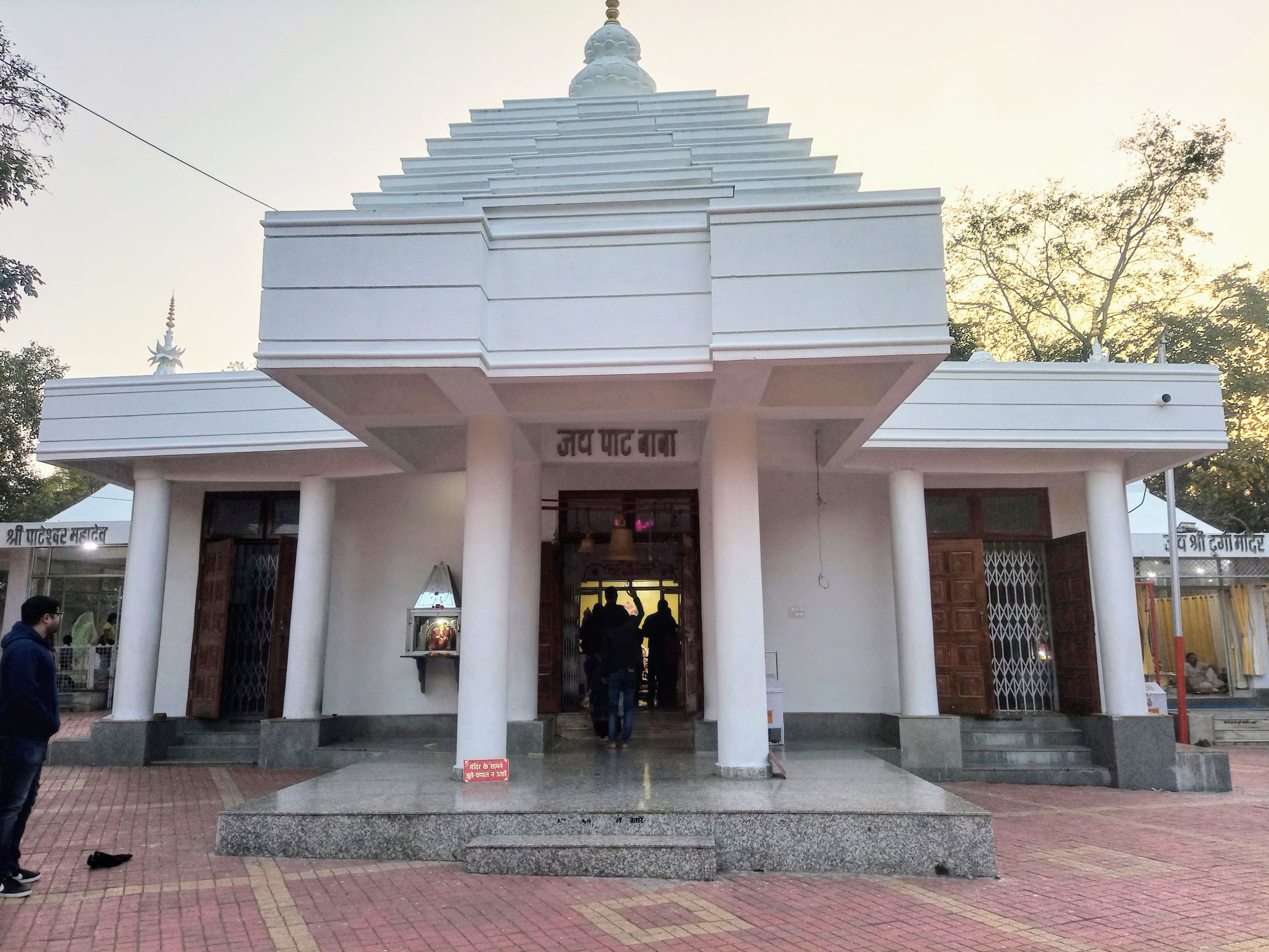

Religion
- Affiliation: Hinduism
- Deity: Lord Hanuman

Location
- Location: Jabalpur
- State: Madhya Pradesh
- Country: India

Architecture
- Creator: Smith (a British officer)
- Date established: 12 August 1903; 121 years ago

Paat Baba Mandir is a Hanuman temple located in Jabalpur, Madhya Pradesh, India. It was built by a British officer on 12 August 1903. It is believed that Lord Hanuman helped in building the Gun Carriage Factory, and he still protects it. Special aarti of Lord Hanuman is performed every Tuesday at 7:30 pm in the Paat Baba Mandir.

== History ==
British officer Smith wanted to build a factory in Jabalpur for the mass production of weapons. He named it as 'Gun Carriage Factory'.

Whenever he built the wall of the factory, the wall would automatically collapse at night. This continued for several days and the whole work would get ruined at night.

Being troubled by this event, when Smith went to sleep, Lord Hanuman appeared in his dream and told him that there was a statue near the factory, which is buried in the ground.

The next day, Smith started excavation process all around the factory. He found a statue of Lord Hanuman, buried in the ground. He wrapped the statue in a red cloth. On 12 August 1903, the construction of the Paat Baba Mandir began.

After the construction finished, as soon as the work of building the Gun Carriage Factory started, it was finished safely, without any trouble. It is believed that Lord Hanuman helped in the development of the Gun Carriage Factory, and he still protects it.

== More temples in Paat Baba Mandir ==
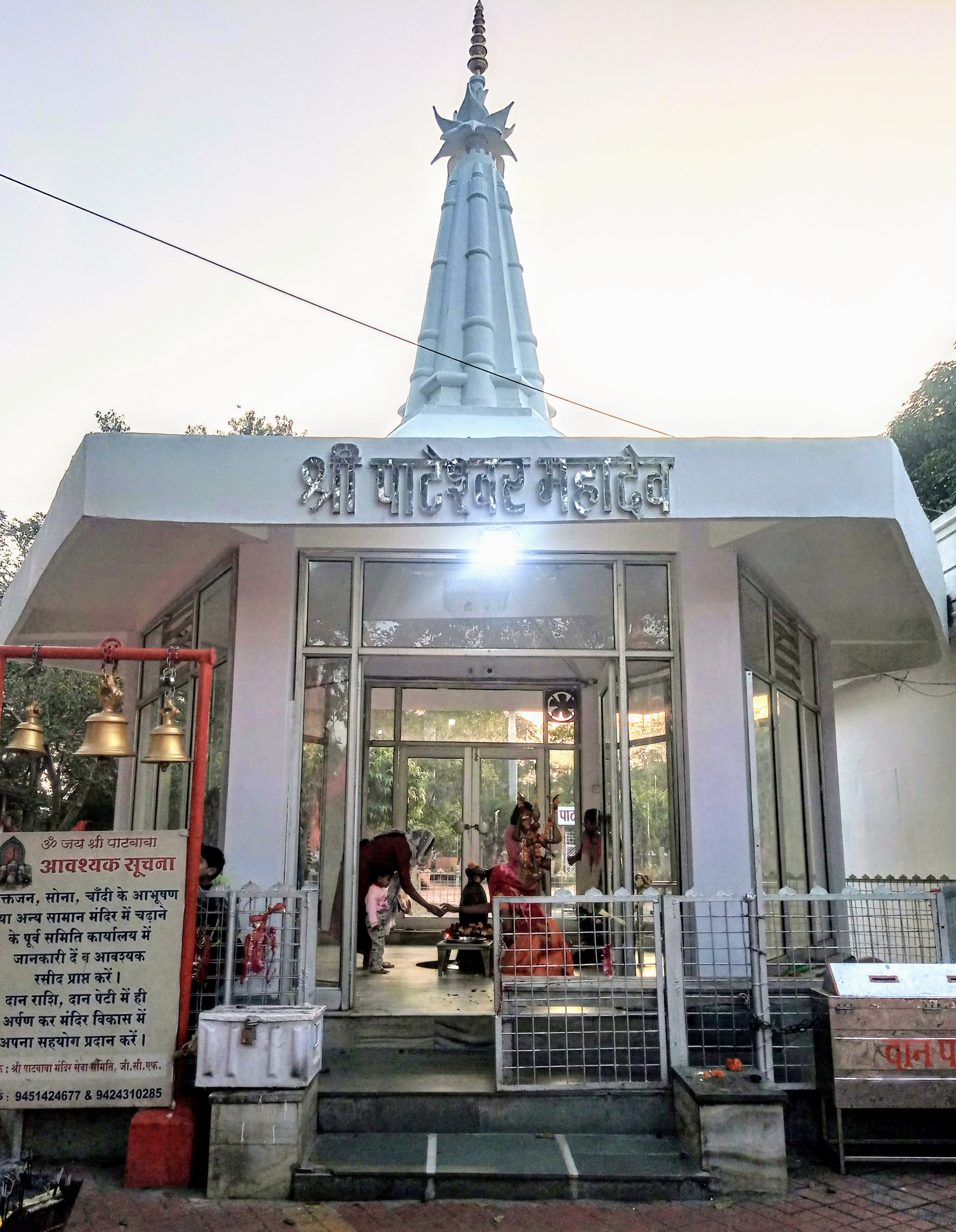
Pateshwar Mahadev temple

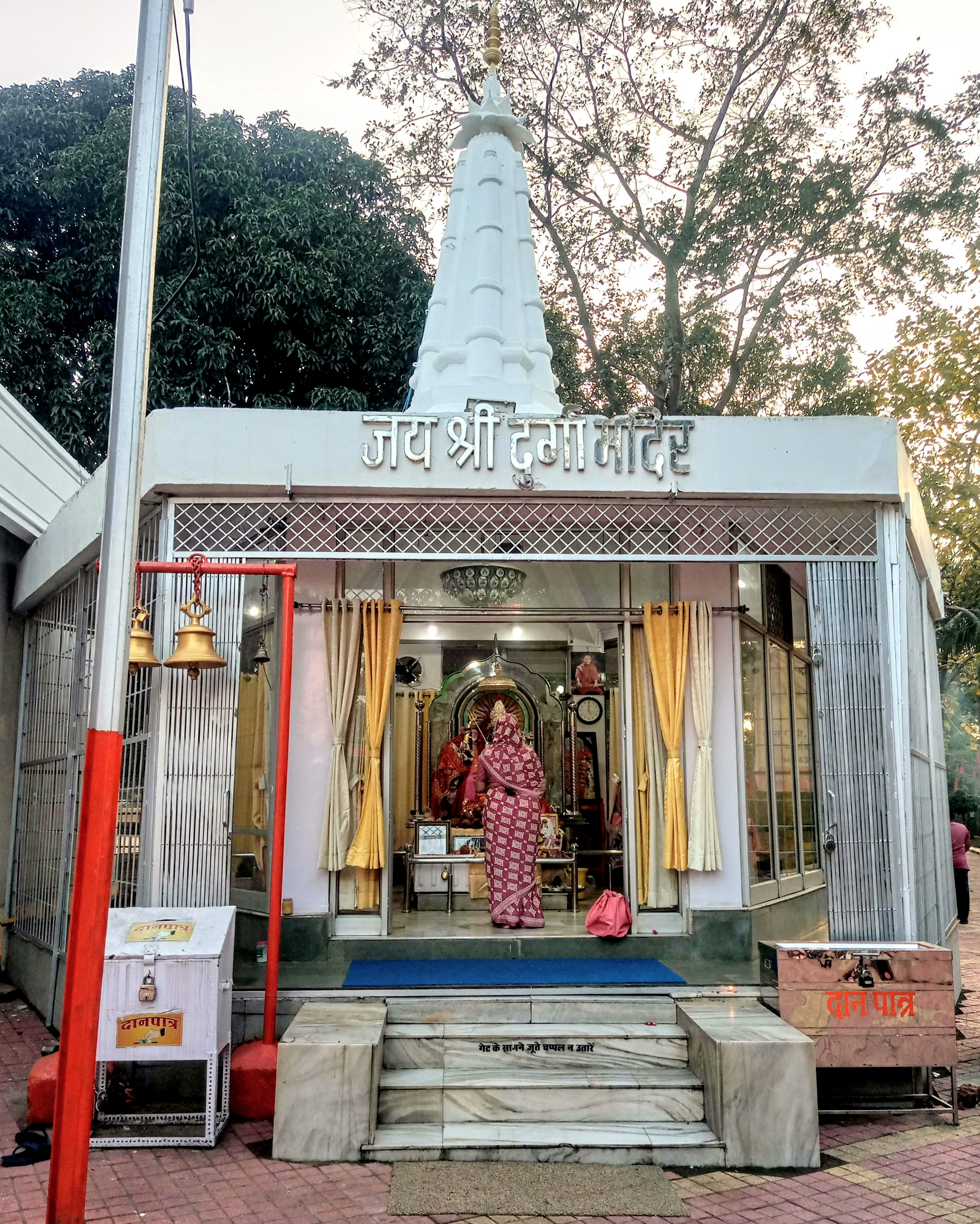
Durga temple

Apart from the temple of Lord Hanuman, a temple of Pateshwar Mahadev has been built in the Paat Baba Mandir. Also, a temple of Maa Durga has been built.
