= Ram Kinkar Upadhyay =

- Born: 1924; Jabalpur, Madhya Pradesh
- Died: 2002 (aged 77–78)
- Awards: Padma Bhushan

Pt. Ram Kinkar Upadhyay (1924–2002) Born in Jabalpur, Madhya Pradesh, though his ancestral village was in Barainin, Near Bhatauli Bridge, Mirzapur, Uttar Pradesh was a noted scholar on Indian scriptures and a recipient of Padma Bhushan in 1999. He was born on 1 November 1924 and died in 2002.

== Publications ==
- Manas Charitavali
- Manas Muktavali
- Sugreev aur Vibhishan
- krodh
- Vijay, Vivek aur Vibhooti
- Premmurti Bharat
- Krupa
- Parashuram Samvad
- Bhagwan Shriram Satya ya Kalpana
- Navdha Bhakti
- Manas Pravachan
