= Pukhraj Bafna =

Indian pediatrician and health consultant

- Born: 14 November 1946 (age 79); Rajnandgaon, Chhattisgarh, India
- Occupation: Pediatrician
- Awards: Padma Shri; IMA National C. T. Thakkar Award; Becon International Award; IAP Academic Excellence Award

Pukhraj Bafna is an Indian pediatrician and adolescent health consultant, known for his contributions towards tribal child and adolescent health. The Government of India honored Bafna in 2011, with the fourth highest civilian award of Padma Shri.

== Biography ==
Pukhraj Bafna was born on 14 November 1946 at Rajnandgaon, in the Indian state of Chhattisgarh. He graduated in medicine (MBBS) in 1969 from Netaji Subhash Chandra Bose Medical College, Jabalpur and continued his studies there to obtain the medical degrees of DCh (1972) and MD (1973) in pediatrics. He has also obtained a doctoral degree from Jain Vishva Bharati University, Ladnun.

Bafna is credited with a book, Status of Tribal Child Health in India. He has also been writing a health column for over 40 years (since 1973) in Sabera Sanket, a Hindi language newspaper. He has also attended several seminars and has chaired many conferences.

Pukhraj Bafna has conducted over 500 child health camps and has supported 149 orphaned children in Bastar whose parents lost their lives due to militancy in the area. He lives in Rajnandgaon, Chhattisgarh.

== Awards and recognitions ==
Pukhraj Bafna is a recipient of the National C. T. Thakkar Award of the Indian Medical Association in 1978 and the Becon International Award in 1986. He has also received the Mahaveer Mahatma Award from the Times of India group and the Academic Excellence Award from the Indian Academy of Pediatrics, both in 2004. Jain Vishva Bharati University Rajasthan and the Government of Kerala have honored Bafna with citations. In 2011, The Government of India included him in the list of Republic day honours for the award of Padma Shri.
