= Netaji Subhash Chandra Bose Medical College =

Post BSC nursing 2nd year syllabus

Coordinates: 23.150159°N 79.880765°E

- Type: Medical college and hospital
- Established: 1955; 71 years ago
- Dean: Dr. Navneet Saxena
- Location: Jabalpur, Madhya Pradesh, India
- Affiliations: Madhya Pradesh Medical Science University, NMC
- Website: http://www.nscbmc.ac.in/

Netaji Subhash Chandra Bose Medical College, also known as NSCB Medical College, is the third oldest medical college in the state of Madhya Pradesh, India. It is located in the city of Jabalpur. It was founded in 1955 as Government Medical College, Jabalpur.

Admission is through a pre-medical entrance exam and the current class size is 250 students per year. It has a full service medical hospital on campus which is the main teaching hospital. It is also accredited for Post graduate and subspeciality medical education.

It is named after Netaji Subhas Chandra Bose, the most prominent leader of the Indian independence movement. The Dean of NSCB Medical College is Dr. Navneet Saxena.

NSCB Medical is located in the Garha region of Jabalpur, and is surrounded by hills.

== Notable alumni ==
- Yogesh Kumar Chawla – Padma Shri awardee, former Director of Postgraduate Institute of Medical Education and Research.
- Pradeep Chowbey – Padma Shri awardee, Chairman of Max Healthcare.
- Narmada Prasad Gupta – Padma Shri awardee, Chairman of Academics and Research Division Urology at Medanta.
- Pukhraj Bafna – Padma Shri awardee.
- Shashi Wadhwa – former Dean of the All India Institute of Medical Sciences, New Delhi.
