= MRI Robot =

Medical robot

An MRI robot is a medical robot capable of operating within a magnetic resonance imaging (MRI) scanner for the purpose of performing or assisting in image-guided interventions (IGI).

IGI are commonly performed manually by physicians operating instruments, such as needles, based on medical images and are used in most medical fields, particularly in the specialty area of interventional radiology. IGI robots assist in manipulating the instrument or provide guidance for image-navigation. These robots have the potential to improve the performance of IGI because unlike humans, robots are digital devices that may directly communicate with the digital imagers.

== MRI compatibility ==
To be MRI compatible, a robot needs to safely operate and perform its functions within the magnetic field of the MRI without deteriorating the image quality. Thus, the development of MRI robots is a very challenging engineering task because MRI scanners use magnetic fields of very high density (3 teslas is now common), and most of the components commonly used in robotics may not be used in close proximity of the magnet.

Researchers have attempted to overcome the difficulties of robotic components in MRI in a variety of ways; some have placed controls and other magnetic sensitive units outside the shielded room of the MRI. These controls will be connected to the robot by either hydraulic or pneumatic transmission lines.

Aside from the difficulties of robotics use in the large magnetic fields found with MRI, the small gap between the MRI and the patient limits the physical size of robots used as the inner radius of an MRI is typically 55 cm.

In addition to the robot itself, there must be a way to track the position, orientation and force being applied to the instrument. Though this may potentially be done with continuous MRI, some uses of MRI robots may make continuous MRI undesirable due to potential interference between the MRI robot and the changing magnetic fields used in MRI. Many times this tracking is done using some sort of optical system which may include fiber optics.

=== Testing ===
Before an MRI robot can be used in a clinical setting, various tests must be performed and at various stages. Testing must be performed both during the engineering stages and through clinical trials. The tests performed will change dependent on the usage of the MRI robot. Some robots will be used under continuous imaging while others may only be imaged in intervals.

Some of the tests performed while engineering an MRI robot would include material tests and signal-to-noise ratio (SNR). In a material test, the materials used for the robot are tested in magnetic fields to insure no interference exists between the material and magnetic field. One form of interference would be inducing a current in the robot's wires. This current could inhibit robot control-ability. Additionally, certain materials could cause an artifact or distortion on MR images. Some metals that have been shown to not produce artifacts on MR images include titanium and brass.

After an MRI robot has been constructed, tests must be done while imaging. One measurement to be made is SNR. SNR is a very important measurement in imaging. If the noise is too high compared to the signal, the image quality will suffer. SNR will be measured both when the MRI robot is moving and while stationary. There can be a noticeable difference in SNR between a stationary and moving robot.

Before testing on human patients, MRI robots are typically tested using an imaging phantom, a typical test "subject" used in imaging. These tests can be used to assure instrument placement accuracy.

== Advantages ==
Though engineering MRI robots can be challenging, MRI robots have many advantages. One large advantage of using MRI as the imaging modality is the patient isn't exposed to radiation as they would be from computed tomography (CT scan) and x-ray imaging. MRI also has better image quality than other imaging modalities and is better able to distinguish between cancerous and health cells then ultrasound imaging.

MRI compatible robots could greatly change IGI. Currently, most IGIs are a multi-step process. Initially the patient must be imaged in order to decide the best location to begin the procedure. After this scan, the patient is moved to make any necessary incisions and prepare for their operation. The patient is then scanned again to ensure proper alignment of the instruments. If the instruments aren't properly aligned, the instrument must be moved, followed by another scan. This process of moving and scanning continues until the correct location and alignment of instruments is obtained. During each scan, the images must be registered again.

While using an MRI robot, the instrument could be implemented under continual imaging. As a result, real-time changes in instrument path could be made. Making real-time changes in path would be helpful in correcting needle bending. Needle bending can occur from patient movement and breathing and even from the needle moving through tissue. By not moving the patient, potential sources of needle bending and need for image registration would be minimized.

== Disadvantages ==
One issue with MRI robots is the potential use of transmission lines. Hydraulic transmission lines can leak and potentially ruin sensitive equipment. Pneumatic transmission lines can have issues with maintaining the necessary pressure to insure adequate response times due to long transmission lines. Aside from the transmission method used, potential differences in the size and shape of MRI rooms could limit the universality of MRI robots, even within multiple MRI rooms in one hospital. Additionally, the length of transmission lines would make setup and removal of MRI robots time consuming.

== Potential uses ==
MRI robots have many potential uses. These include brachytherapy, biopsy, neuroscience research and tumor removal. One type of tumor removal that would greatly benefit from MRI robots is brain tumor removal. Brain tumors are extremely difficult to remove. There is also the potential to not completely remove the tumor. By using real-time imaging, the whole brain tumor would have a greater chance of being removed.

Within neuroscience, MRI robots could be used to help better understand if a stroke victim will be responsive to robot-aided rehabilitation and other rehabilitation methodologies. Using functional MRI (fMRI) or other forms of functional neuroimaging methods, researchers can monitor and notice changes in functional connectivity within the brain. When using fMRI, an MRI robot would be used to help mimic everyday tasks such as shoulder and elbow movement.

Another area where MRI robots could be extremely helpful is in prostate biopsies. Currently, most prostate biopsies are performed using transrectal ultrasonography (TRUS). However, approximately 20% of people with prostate cancer who have a biopsy done with TRUS will be told they do not have cancer. One issue with TRUS is that it is unable to differentiate between healthy and cancerous cells. Differentiating between cell types is one of the advantages of MRI. Thus, an MRI robot used for prostate biopsies would assist in correctly diagnosing prostate cancer.

== Examples ==
The URobotics research group at Johns Hopkins University has developed an electricity-free, non-magnetic, and dielectric robot known as MrBot. This operates with air for the motors and light for its sensors. This achievement was possible through the invention of a new type of pneumatic motor, the PneuStep, which allows for simple, fail-safe precision controlled motion.

The Automation and Interventional Medicine Robotics Lab at Worcester Polytechnic Institute has been developing enabling technologies for MRI-guided interventions. This work includes sensors, actuators, software, and controllers. The group has also developed various types of fully MRI-compatible robots for percutaneous prostate interventions and another one for guiding deep brain stimulation (DBS) electrode placement under real-time MR image guidance for the treatment of Parkinson's Disease.

== See also ==
- Computer-assisted surgery
- Image-guided radiation therapy
- Image-guided surgery
- Robotic surgery
