= Pradeep Chowbey =

Indian surgeon

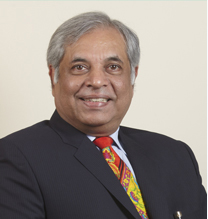
- Born: India
- Education: NSCB Medical College (MBBS, MS)
- Occupation: Surgeon
- Known for: Minimal access surgery Bariatric surgery
- Awards: Padma Shri; Honoris Causa Doctorate, University of Jabalpur
- Website: chowbey.com

Pradeep Kumar Chowbey is an Indian surgeon, known for laparoscopic and bariatric surgeries. He is the incumbent Executive vice chairman of the Max Healthcare, Chairman of the Minimal Access, Metabolic & Bariatric Surgery and Allied Surgical Specialities of the Max Healthcare Institute, New Delhi. He is the founder of the Minimal Access, Metabolic & Bariatric Surgery Centre at the Sir Ganga Ram Hospital, New Delhi and has served as the Honorary Surgeon to the President of India, Dalai Lama and the Indian Armed Forces (AFMS). The Government of India awarded him the fourth highest civilian honour of the Padma Shri in 2002.

== Education & career ==
Chowbey graduated in medicine (MBBS) and secured his master's degree in surgery (MS) from Netaji Subhash Chandra Bose Medical College (then known as Government Medical College, Jabalpur), after which he earned a diplomate from the National Board of Examinations, New Delhi, in 1979. After starting his medical practice at a public hospital in Delhi, he moved to Sir Ganga Ram Hospital in 1984 to take up the post of a consultant surgeon, handling hepatobiliary, pancreatic and breast surgeries. When minimally invasive surgical method was first developed in France in 1989, Chowbey underwent training in the procedure at Singapore General Hospital from the pioneers of the technology such as Mohan Chellappa which helped him to perform the first Laparoscopic Cholecystectomy in North India.

At Sir Ganga Ram Hospital, Chowbey established Minimal Access, Metabolic and Bariatric Surgery Centre where the team led by him is reported to have performed over 55,000 minimally invasive procedures. His list of patients included K. R. Narayanan, former President of India, Dalai Lama and Arun Jaitley who were operated on by him in 2001, 2008 and 2014 respectively. He has been involved in the designing of the International Centre of Excellence for Bariatric Surgery Program of the Surgical Review Corporation, USA and was one of the key members among the founders of the Asia Pacific Hernia Society where he served as the founder president. He is the president of the Asia Pacific Metabolic and Bariatric Surgery Society, Asia Pacific Chapter of International Federation for the Surgery of Obesity and Metabolic Disorders, and International Federation for the Surgery of Obesity and Metabolic Disorders and has served Obesity and Metabolic Surgery Society of India and the Indian Association of Gastrointestinal Endo-Surgeons as their president. He sits in the Board of Governors of the Gasless Laparoscopic and Endoscopic Surgeons Society International and is the Advisor to the Asia Pacific Endosurgery Task Force (AETF).

Chowbey is a founding designee in the International Centre of Excellence for Bariatric Surgery Program by Surgical Review Corporation, USA. He is an Honorary Fellow of the American Society of Metabolic and Bariatric Surgery, International Medical Science Academy (IMSA), International Congress of Surgeons (ICS) and Association of Surgeons of India (ASI). He is also an Honorary Member of the Japanese Society of Endoscopic Surgeons, German Hernia Society, Indonesian Hernia Society and Gulf Cooperation Council Hernia Society (National Chapter of Asia Pacific Hernia Society, Dubai). He was included in the Guinness Book of World Records in 1997 and the Limca Book of Records for more than 80,000 major minimal access surgeries (1992–2018) performed by a surgeon. Dr Chowbey also has a Limca Book of Record for establishing the first dedicated Department of Minimal Access Surgery (MAS ) in the Asian subcontinent in 1995 The Government of India awarded him the civilian honour of the Padma Shri in 2002.

Chowbey was the first to introduce the technique called MAFT (Minimally Invasive Fistula Treatment) in entire Asia-Pacific region. The technique is performed for surgical treatment of anal fistulas through a fistulascope. This concept was a breakthrough surgical treatment for anal fistulas as it has a very short recovery period, requires no dressings and there are no chances of loss of control (fecal incontinence).

He operated on 14 years old Mihir Jain, believed to be World's heaviest teenager weighing 237 Kilograms in July 2018. By December 2018, Mihir's weight reduced by 100 kg and now stands at 137 kg.

In 2021, Dr. Chowbey began utilizing the advanced technology of the next-generation robot, Versius, to extend the benefits of robotic surgery to common surgical procedures such as gallbladder surgery and hernia repair. This next-generation robotic surgery system is designed to offer all the advantages of laparoscopic surgery while providing enhanced precision, accuracy, and safety.

In 2026, under the chairmanship of Dr Pradeep Chowbey, Max Institute of Laparoscopic, Robotic, Bariatric and GI Surgery, Max Healthcare, New Delhi signed an MoU with Intuitive Surgical to support structured adoption of robotic-assisted surgery and expand patient access across India."Max Institute Signs MoU with Intuitive to Promote Robotic-Assisted Surgery". Economic Times Health.

== Books and journals ==
Books

- Surgical Repair of Abdominal Wall Hernias
- Hand-Book of Bariatric Surgery
- Laparoscopic Cholecystectomy—A Comprehensive Atlas
- Single-Port Laparoscopic Cholecystectomy Using X-Cone and Reusable Hand Instruments, 2012
- Laparo-endoscopic Hernia Surgery

Journals

- Obesity Surgery -The Journal of Metabolic Surgery and Allied Care
- Surgical Endoscopy -Guidelines for laparoscopic (TAPP) and Endoscopic (TEP) treatment of Inguinal Hernia, International Endohernia Society (IEHS)
- Indian Journal of Surgery -Residual Gallstone Disease — Laparoscopic Management
- Surgical Endoscopy -Update of guidelines on Laparoscopic (TAPP) and Endoscopic (TEP) treatment of Inguinal Hernia (International Endohernia Society)
