= Patrika =

Patrika is the romanisation of a term that translates to "publication", "periodical" or "letter" in several Indian languages, and may refer to:

== Newspapers ==
- Amrita Bazar Patrika, a newspaper in India started 1868
- Anandabazar Patrika, a Bengali-language newspaper published in Kolkata, New Delhi and Mumbai
- Jugantar Patrika, a Bengali revolutionary newspaper founded in 1906 in Calcutta
- Rajasthan Patrika, also known as Patrika, a Hindi-language daily newspaper
- Syandan Patrika, a newspaper of Tripura, India
- Tattwabodhini Patrika, a newspaper published from 1843 to 1883 in Kolkata, India

== Other uses ==
- Patrika Darbo (born 1948), American actress
- Vinaya Patrika, a devotional poem by Goswami Tulsidas
