= Mazher Jabalpuri =

Pakistani sports writer and statistician (c.1930–2021)

Mazher Jabalpuri (c. 1930 – 21 April 2021) was a Pakistani sports writer and statistician who wrote more than 15 books on field hockey.

Born in Jabalpur, Madhya Pradesh, Jabalpuri migrated to Pakistan at the age of 17 in 1947.
