= Yogesh Kumar Chawla =

Indian hepatologist

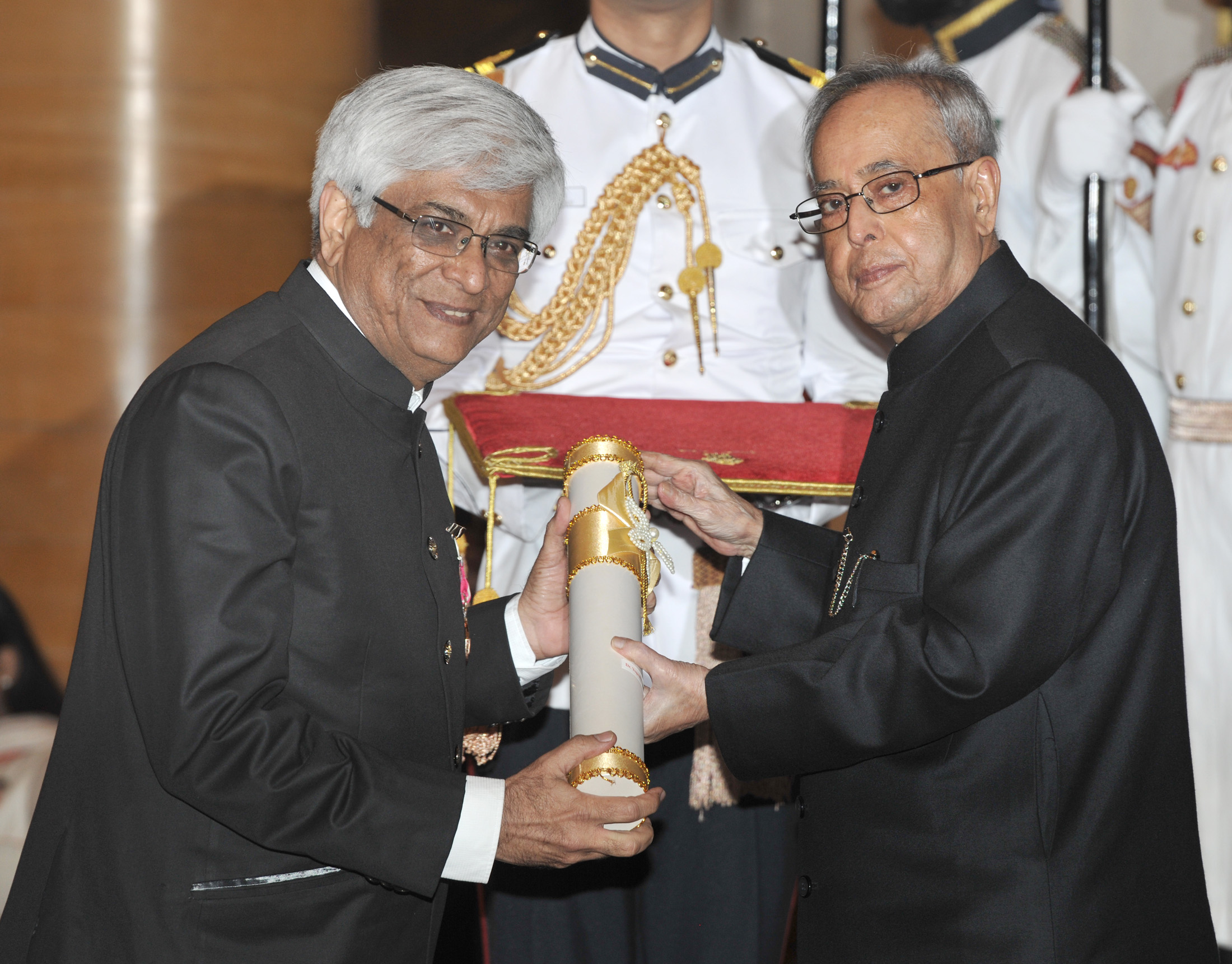
- The President, Shri Pranab Mukherjee presenting the Padma Shri Award to Dr. Yogesh Chawla, at a Civil Investiture Ceremony, at Rashtrapati Bhavan, in New Delhi on 8 April 2015
- Born: India
- Occupation: Hepatologist
- Awards: Padma Shri; Dr. B. C. Roy Award

Yogesh Kumar Chawla is an Indian medical doctor, hepatologist and has served as the director of the Post Graduate Institute of Medical Education and Research (PGIMER), Chandigarh. He graduated in medicine from the Netaji Subhash Chandra Bose Medical College, Jabalpur, secured a master's degree (MD) in gastroenterology from the same college before joining PGIMER in 1983 as a member of faculty of the department of hepatology and became the head of the department in 1999. Chawla, a recipient of the 1999 Dr. B. C. Roy Award and an elected fellow of the National Academy of Medical Sciences was honoured by the Government of India in 2015 with Padma Shri, the fourth highest Indian civilian award.

== See also ==
- Hepatology
- Gastroenterology
