= List of tourist attractions in Jabalpur =

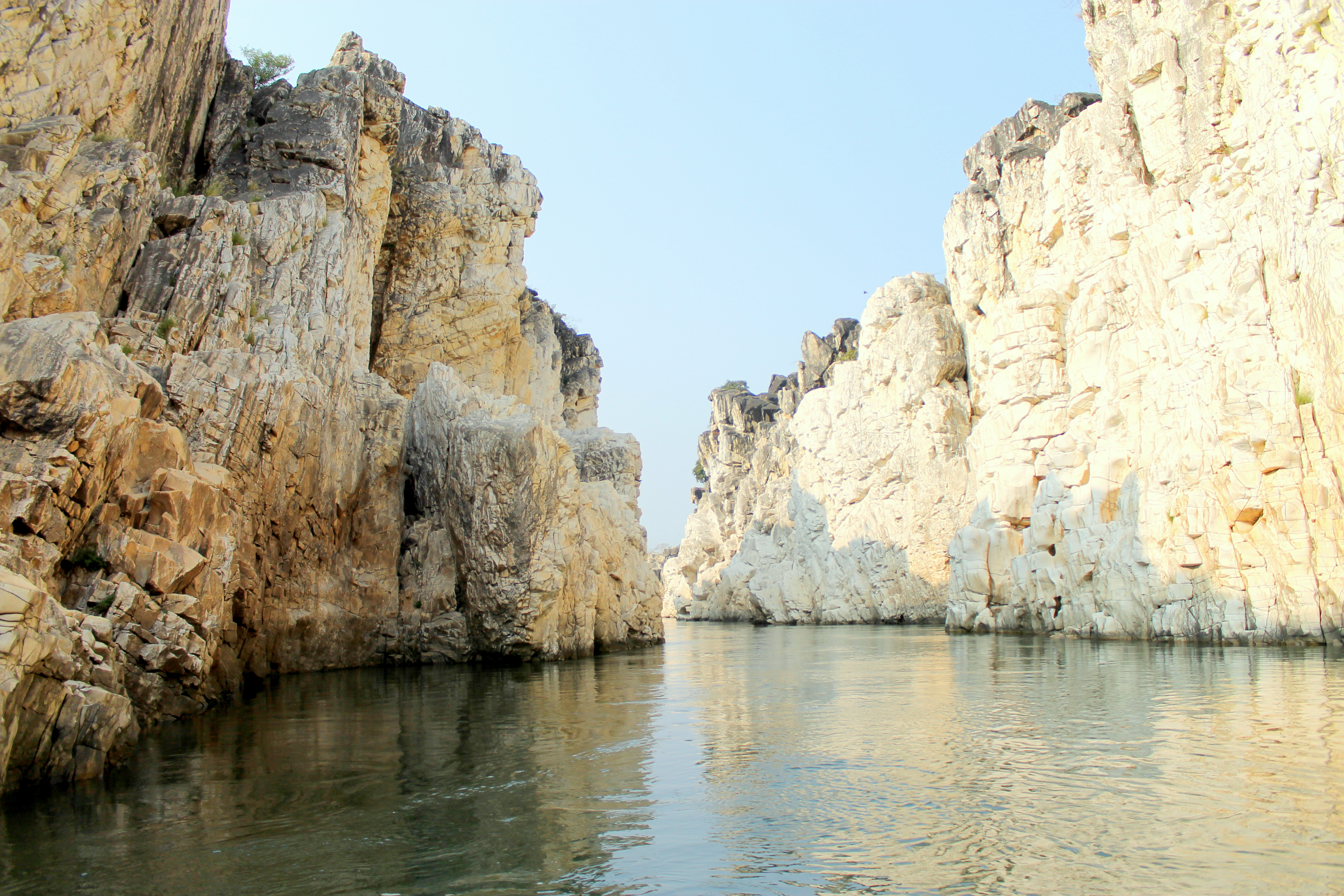
Marble Rocks, Bhedaghat, Jabalpur

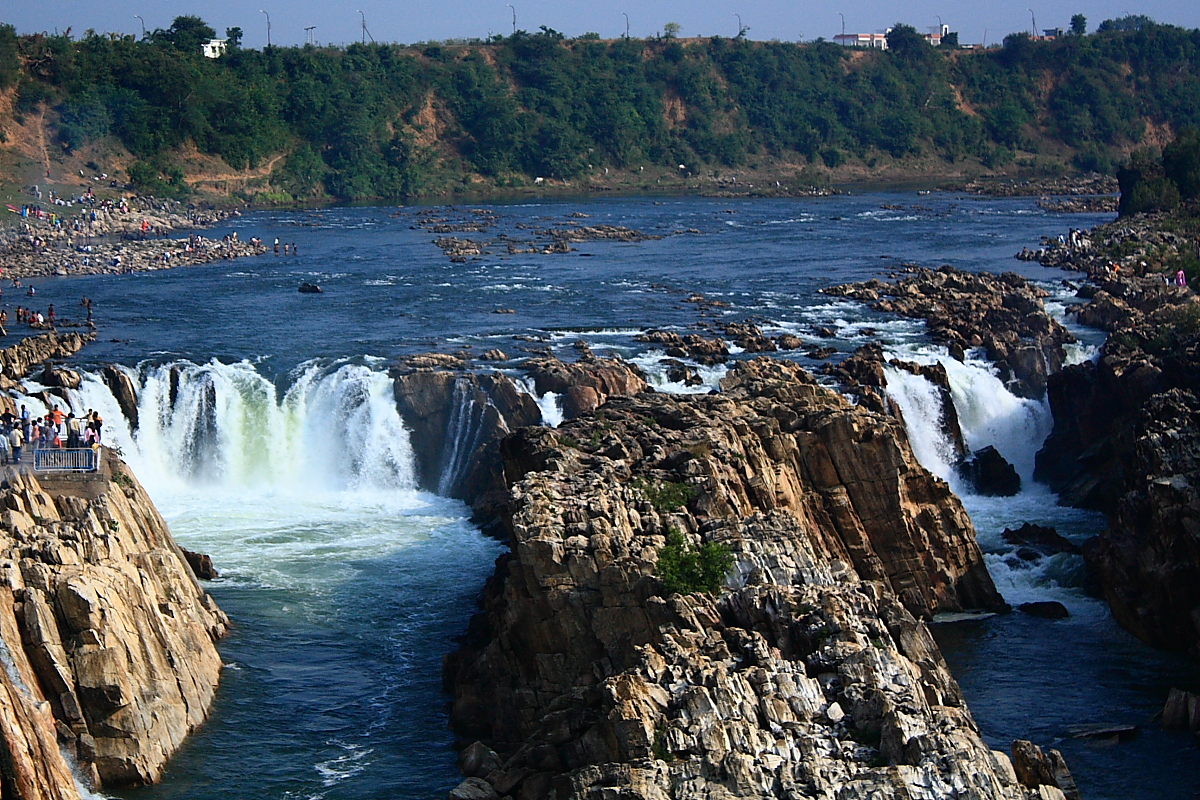
Dhuandhar Waterfalls, Bhedaghat, Jabalpur

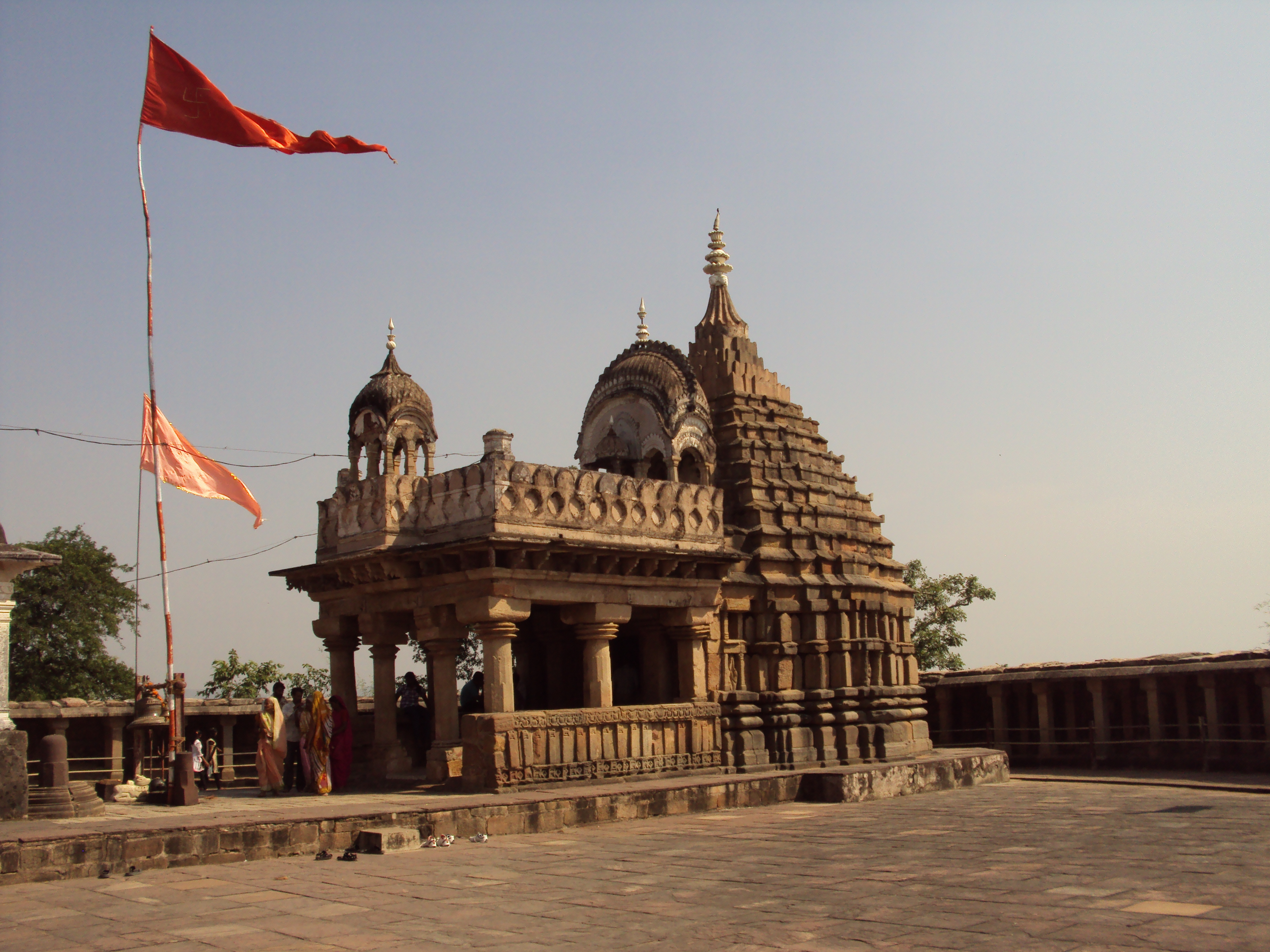
Chausath Yogini Temple, Bhedaghat, Jabalpur

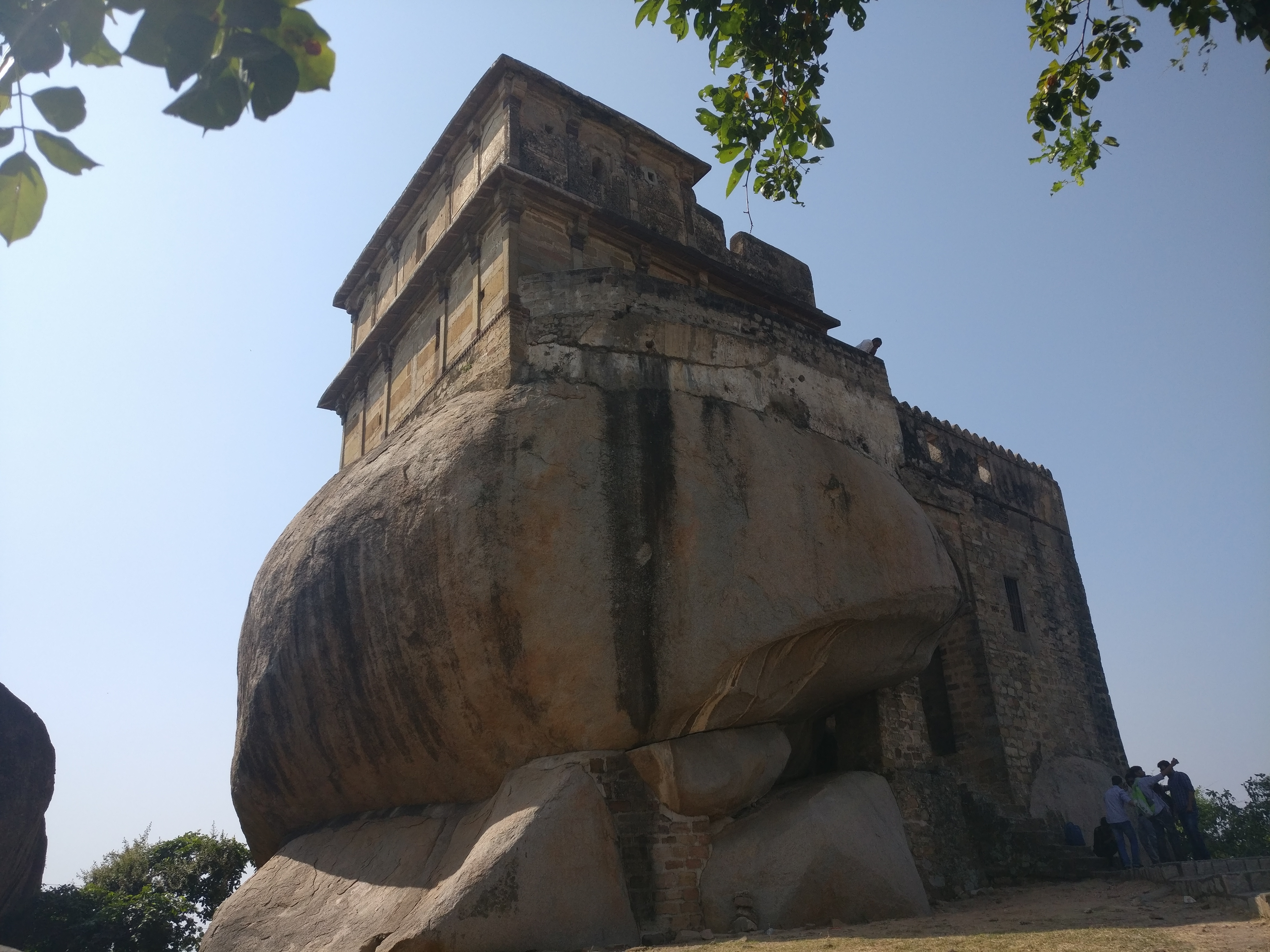
Madan Mahal, Jabalpur

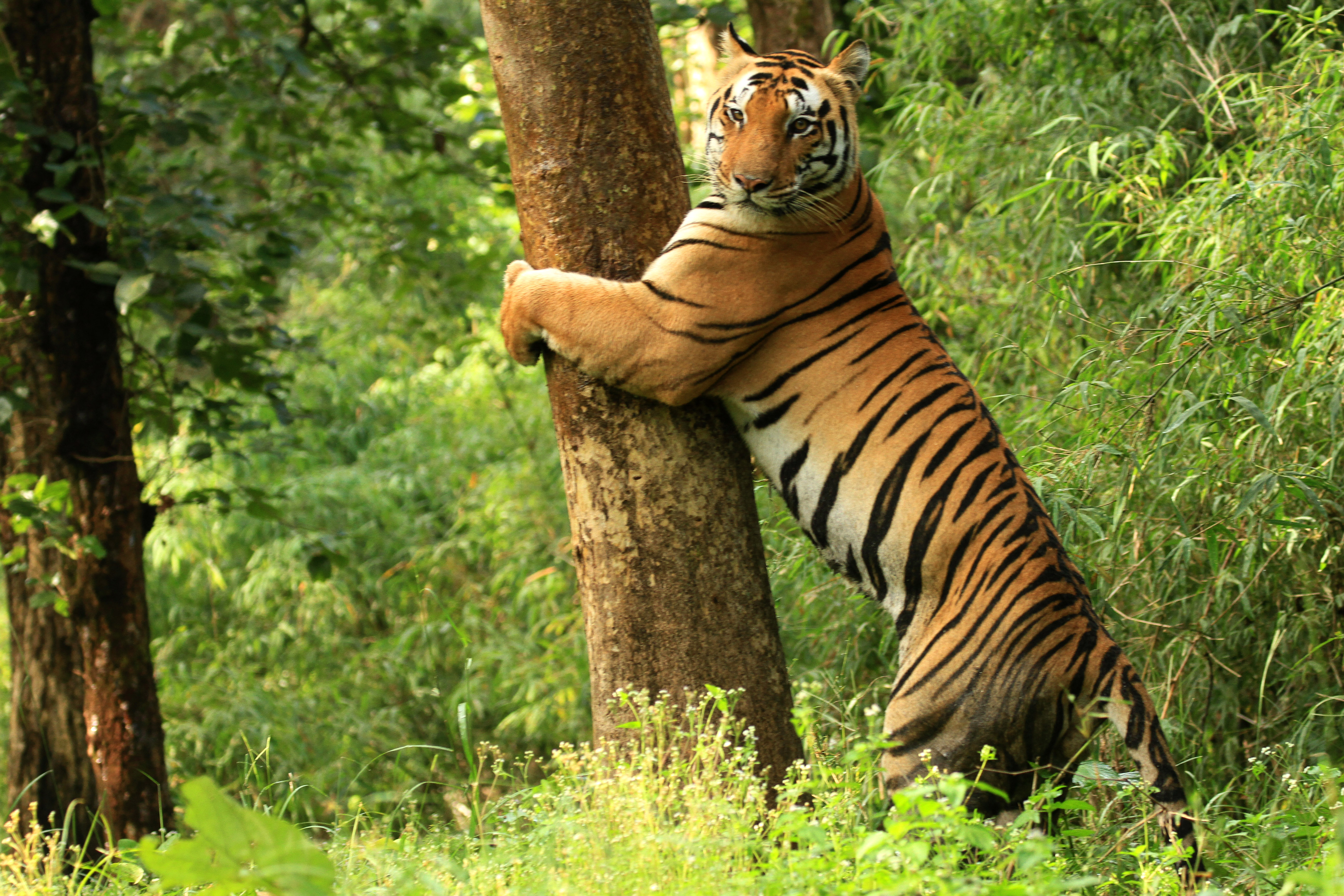
Kanha National Park

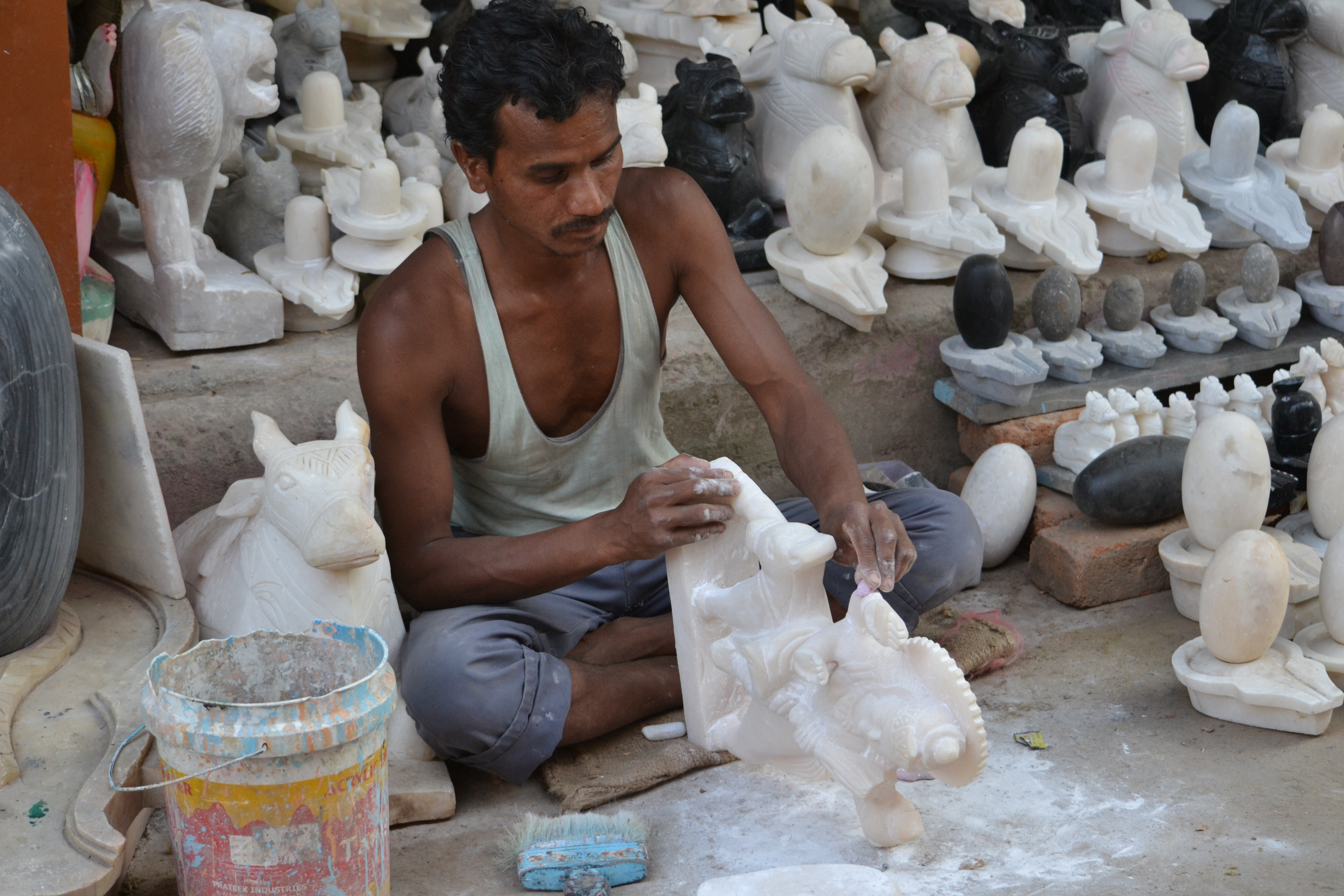
Marble sculptures of Jabalpur

Jabalpur is one of the most important tourist destinations in Madhya Pradesh and Central India, due to the presence of the Marble Rocks, ghats, waterfalls, and gorges on Narmada River, besides medieval structures of historical significance. The area has significant geological importance too.

As Jabalpur is connected with major cities of India through rail, road and air, it has always been preferred as a gateway for wildlife tours in Central India. Consequently, Jabalpur is a convenient base for the visitors to the world-renowned tiger reserves such as Kanha National Park, Bandhavgarh National Park and Pench National Park as well as the largest wildlife sanctuary in Madhya Pradesh in terms of area, Nauradehi Wildlife Sanctuary, which is a part of the recently notified Veerangana Durgavati Tiger Reserve.

Jabalpur is known for its stonecraft.

== Attractions in and around Jabalpur ==
=== Bhedaghat Area ===
Bhedaghat is the prime attraction of Jabalpur and among the most important landmarks of Madhya Pradesh.

- Marble Rocks - The most important and iconic landmark of Jabalpur. Huge marble gorge created by the Narmada river, which is a geological wonder.
- Dhuandhar Falls - Picturesque waterfalls on the Narmada river and the ropeway across the river gives a bird eye view of Bhedaghat area.
- Swarg Dwari
- Chausath Yogini Temple, Jabalpur - Located on a hill near the Marble Rocks, the temple was built around 1000 CE by the Kalchuri King Yuvaraja II.

=== Lamhetaghat Area ===
Very well known among the geologists and palaeologists for its unique rock formation, called 'Lamheta Formation', and dinosaur fossils. Included in the tentative lists of UNESCO World Heritage Sites along with Marble Rocks. Major attractions of the Lamheta Ghat area are-

- Lamheta Rock Formations - The Lameta Formation was first identified in 1981 by geologists working for the Geological Survey of India (GSI), G. N. Dwivedi and Dhananjay Mahendrakumar Mohabey.
- Beohari Temple Complex - Many temples and stone-ghats were built by the Beohar clan, the ex-Jagirdars (pre-1947) of Jabalpur.
- Ghughra Falls

=== Madan Mahal Area ===
- Madan Mahal, a fort said to be built by the Gond king Madan Shahi in the 15th century CE.
- Balancing Rock
- Shail Parn Udyan - A rock and vegetation garden displaying various rock formations, shapes and tree species.
- Devtal - Devtal Garden and Pond.

=== Tiger tourism ===
Jabalpur and Nagpur are known as the gateways to the dense jungles of central India, known around the world for its tigers. Many of the prominent national parks and reserves of the region are located near Jabalpur.

- Kanha National Park - 120 Kilometres: One of the nine initial tiger reserves designated under the Project Tiger in 1973 and among the best managed reserves in the country. The reserve was originally created to protect the endangered and endemic subspecies of Swamp Deer.
- Bandhavgarh National Park - 165 Kilometres via Shahpura: Carries one of the desnsest tiger populations and offers highest chances of tiger sighting. Recently discovered ancient sculptures are of immense archaeological importance.
- Nauradehi Wildlife Sanctuary - 90 Kilometres: Known as a stronghold of the endangered Indian Wolf. The grassland habitat was considered suitable for Cheetah reintroduction in India. It is the seventh and the most recent tiger reserve of Madhya Pradesh.
- Pench National Park - 197 Kilometres: The jungle boy Mowgli, a folk hero, belonged to this area. The reserve came to limelight in 2008 when Davi Attenborough's Tiger: Spy in the Jungle was released.
- Govindgarh Palace and Mukundpur White Tiger Safari (225 Kilometres) - The place of origin of all existing white tigers throughout the world.
- Panna National Park - 231 Kilometres: Known for the milestone in conservation efforts by bringing tiger population from zero in 2009 to around 50 in 2019. It is also a stronghold of the critically endangered vulture species of India.
- Satpura Tiger Reserve and Madhai (225 Kilometres via Gadarwara) - An important tiger reserve covering Pachmarhi and the surrounding hill resorts. In 2015, Barasingha was reintroduced from Kanha.

=== Other attractions ===
- Gupteshwar Mandir
- Paat Baba Mandir
- Tilwara Ghat
- Gwarighat
- Jamtara Ghat, located at the confluence of the Narmada and its tributary Pariyat (Pariyatra). The nearby Bhadbhada Waterfalls also attracts visitors.
- Rani Durgawati Museum, built in 1964 to commemorate Rani Durgavati. The museum hosts ancient relics and sculptures, as well as a collection of items related to the life of Mahatma Gandhi. The surrounding Bhawartal Garden also attracts visitors.
- Shaheed Samarak, located in Gol Bazar. The nearby Raanitaal Lake and Garden also attracts visitors.
- Shiva Statue of Kachnar City, a 76 feet (23 m) high Lord Shiva statue, along with a cavern of replicas of Shivalingas from the 12 important holy shrines of Lord Shiva all over the country.
- Dumna Nature Reserve Park
- Bargi Dam - Located around 30 kilometres from Jabalpur, it is one of the earliest modern dams of India, built on the Narmada. It has a huge reservoir, boating facilities, gardens and ropeway. It can be visited via Rani Durgavati's Samadhi, the memorial of the legendary 16th century Gond queen and the local folk celebrity Rani Durgavati, who fell here fighting the invading Mughal armies on 24 June 1564 CE.

=== Other features ===
- Prominent Ghats: Jabalpur is known for its ghats along the Narmada river, holding religious, natural and tourist significance. Some of them are - Bhedaghat, Gwarighat, Tilwara Ghat, Lamheta Ghat, Jilheri Ghat, Khirahni Ghat
- Prominent Temples: Tripur Sundari Mandir, Pisanhari Ki Madhiya, Hanuman Tal Bada Jain Mandir, Gurudwara(Gwarighat), Paat Baba Mandir, Bajnamath Mandir.
- Prominent Taals: The Gond queen Rani Durgavati created 52 tals in the city out of which only a few remain today- Gulaua Tal, Ranital, Hanuman Tal, Thakur Tal, Devtal, Supa Tal, Adhartal, Khambtal, Madhotal, Hathital.
- Prominent Lakes: Sangram Sagar Lake, Ganga Sagar Lake, Robertson Lake, Bal Sagar, Jalpari Lake, Khandari Lake, Bhairo Lake.
- Prominent Falls: Dhuandhar Waterfall, Ghughra Falls, Bhadbhada Falls, Gaubacha Ghat Waterfall, Khandari Falls, Bagdari Waterfall, Nidaan Falls

== Excursions ==
- Mandla (50 km) - In a valley of forested hills and on banks of the Narmada, on the way to Kanha National Park, Mandla is the centre of the Gonds. The Ramnagar fort and the regional tribal art and craft attract tourists.
- Khajuraho (250 km) - A UNESCO World Heritage Site globally known for its temples.
- Maihar (165 km) - The hill top shrine of the goddess Sharada. The Maihar Gharana of music is also widely known.
- Amarkantak (222 km) - The hill station is most notable for being the point of origin of the rivers Narmada and Son. It is a pilgrimage site and one of the 51 Shaktipeethas of the Hindu goddess Adi Shakti. The 11th century temples are of archaeological significance.
- Pachmarhi (230 km) - The hill station of Madhya Pradesh.

== Gallery ==
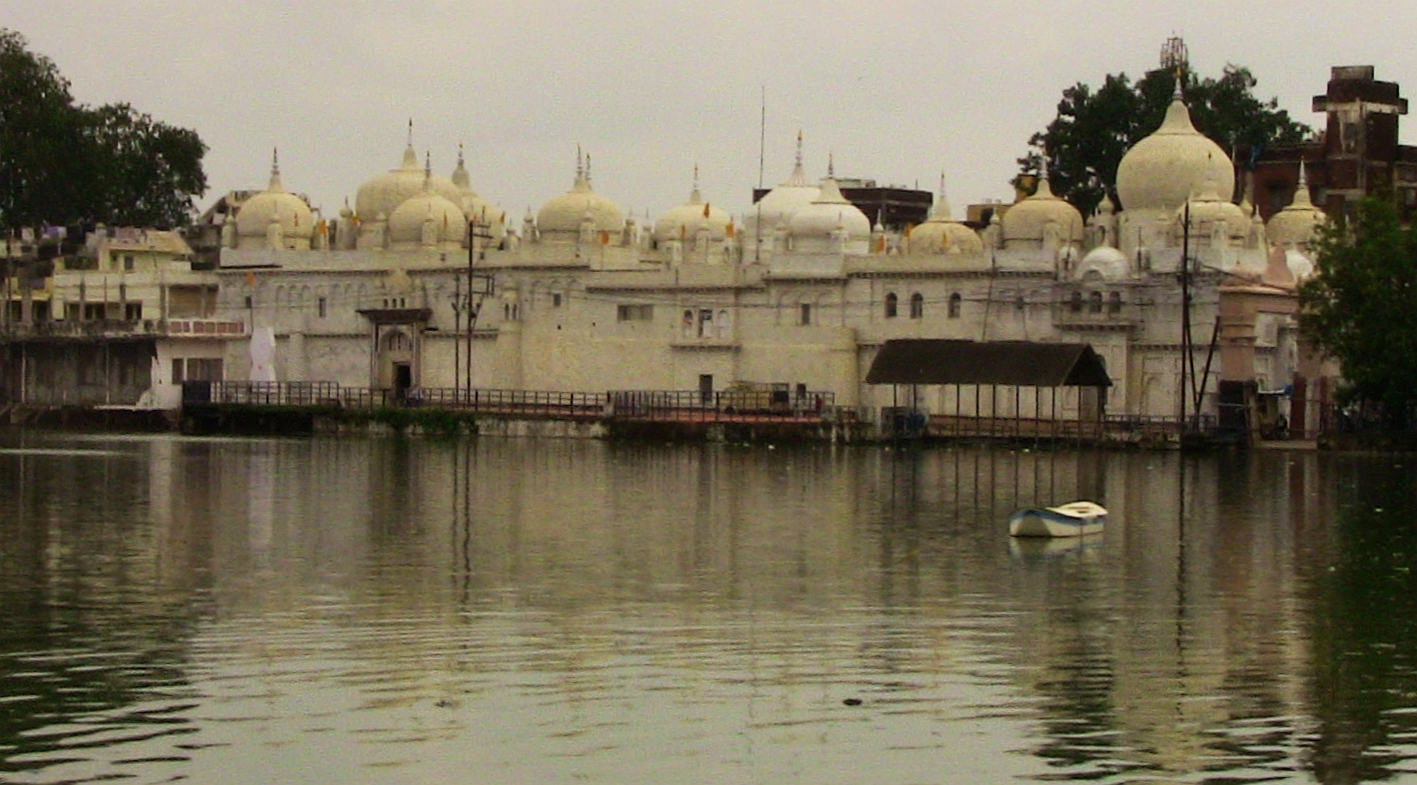
Hanumantal Bada Jain Mandir, Jabalpur, from across Hanumantal Lake

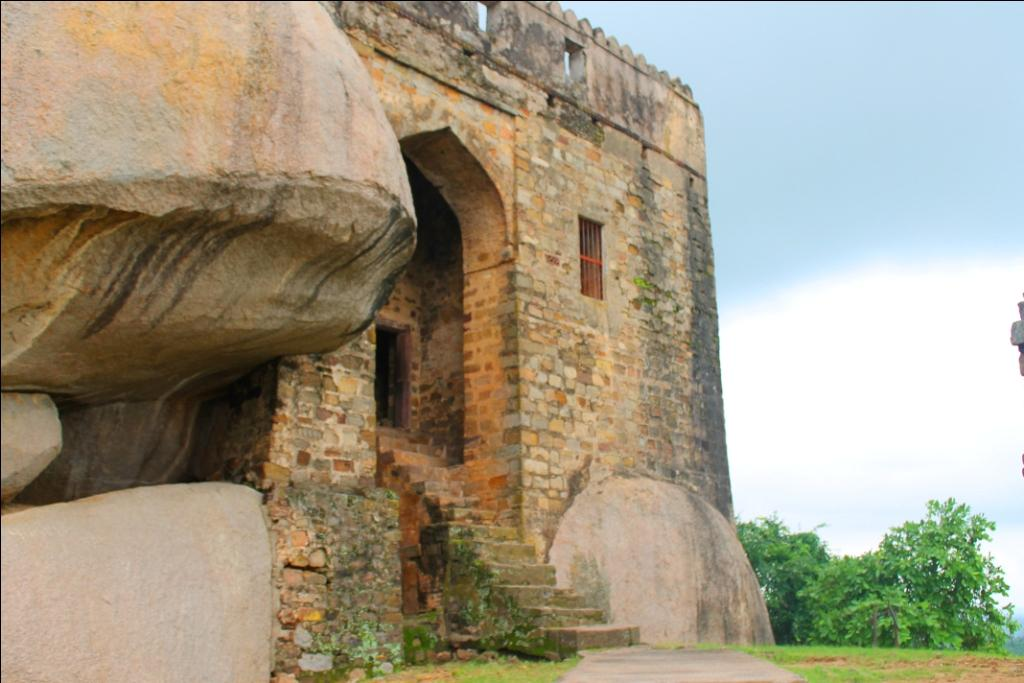
Madan Mahal fort

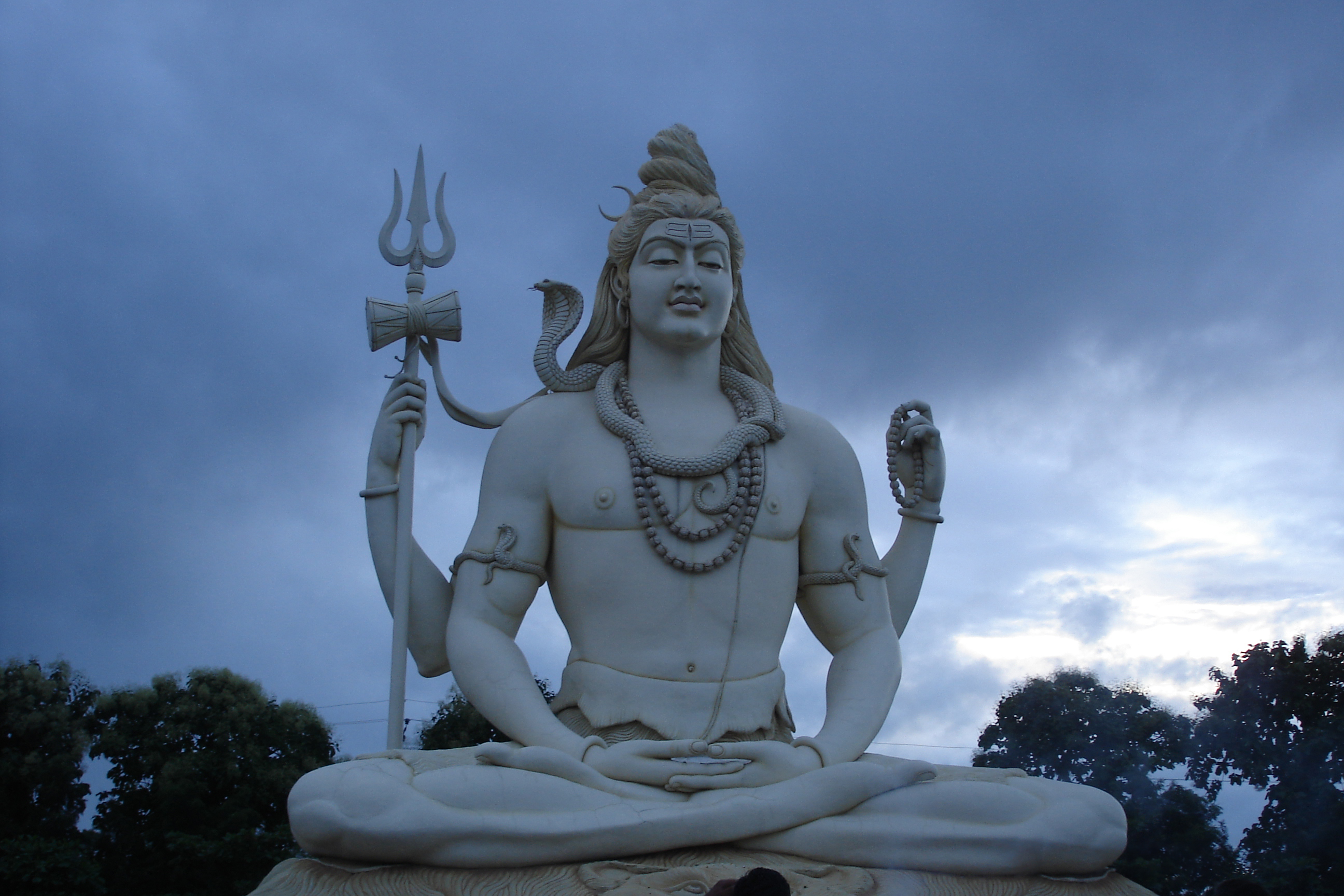
Shiv Statue at Kachnar City, Jabalpur
