= Jabalpur Metro =

Overview
- Transit type: Rapid transit
- Daily ridership: 200,000
- Headquarters: Jabalpur Municipal Corporation

Operation
- Operation will start: proposed

Technical
- System length: 64 kilometres (40 mi)

The Jabalpur Metro, also known as Jabalpur Metro Rail, is a rapid transit system proposed for the city of Jabalpur in Jabalpur Metropolitan Region in the Indian state of Madhya Pradesh. The project was announced by state Chief Minister Shivraj Singh Chouhan on 13 March 2014. The Chief Minister has again declared in a meeting at Jabalpur on 27 September 2023 that Jabalpur will get Metro Railway.The feasibility of this project was being questioned through a study. The work for the feasibility report has been completed in December 2017 and report was released in January 2018.

== Routes ==
The Jabalpur Metro, under Jabalpur Metro Rail Corporation will run in 5 routes under 5 phases as proposed by Madhya Pradesh State Government. They are as follows: - Phase 1:- Howbagh Jabalpur to Gwarighat via Panchsheel Nagar. Phase 2:- Jabalpur Railway Station to Neemkheda via Cantonment, Tilhari & Saliwada. Phase 3:- Madan Mahal Railway Station to Jabalpur Airport via Dumna Nature Reserve Park. Phase 4:- Adhartal Chowk Jabalpur to Madanmahal via Ranital. Phase 5:- Madan Mahal Railway Station to Kachnar City via Garha Police Station. PHase 6:- Kachhpura Railway Station to Tilwara Ghat via ISKON Jabalpur
