= Shahpura, Jabalpur =

Shahpura Bhitoni
- Town
- Location in Madhya Pradesh, India Shahpura Bhitoni (India)
- Coordinates: 23.13°N 79.67°E
- Country: India
- State: Madhya Pradesh
- District: Jabalpur
- Elevation: 381 m (1,250 ft)

Population (2011)
  - Total: 13,601

Languages
  - Official: Hindi
- Time zone: UTC+5:30 (IST)
- ISO 3166 code: IN-MP
- Vehicle registration: MP

Shahpura or Shahpura Bhitoni is a town and a nagar panchayat in Jabalpur district in the Indian state of Madhya Pradesh.

== Geography ==
Shahpura is located at 23.13°N 79.67°E. It has an average elevation of 381 metres (1249 feet).

== Demographics ==
As of 2001 India census, Shahpura had a population of 13,601. Males constitute 52% of the population and females 48%. Shahpura has an average literacy rate of 72%, higher than the national average of 59.5%: male literacy is 77%, and female literacy is 67%. In Shahpura, 14% of the population is under 6 years of age.

== Economy ==
The Narmada river bringing in freshwater from the Vindyachal Ranges has developed Shahpura into an agrarian economy. The land of the Narmada basin with its fertile alluvial soil gives good yields of sorghum, wheat, rice, and millet in the villages around Shahpura. Important among commercial crops are pulses, oilseeds, cotton, sugar cane.

== Temples ==
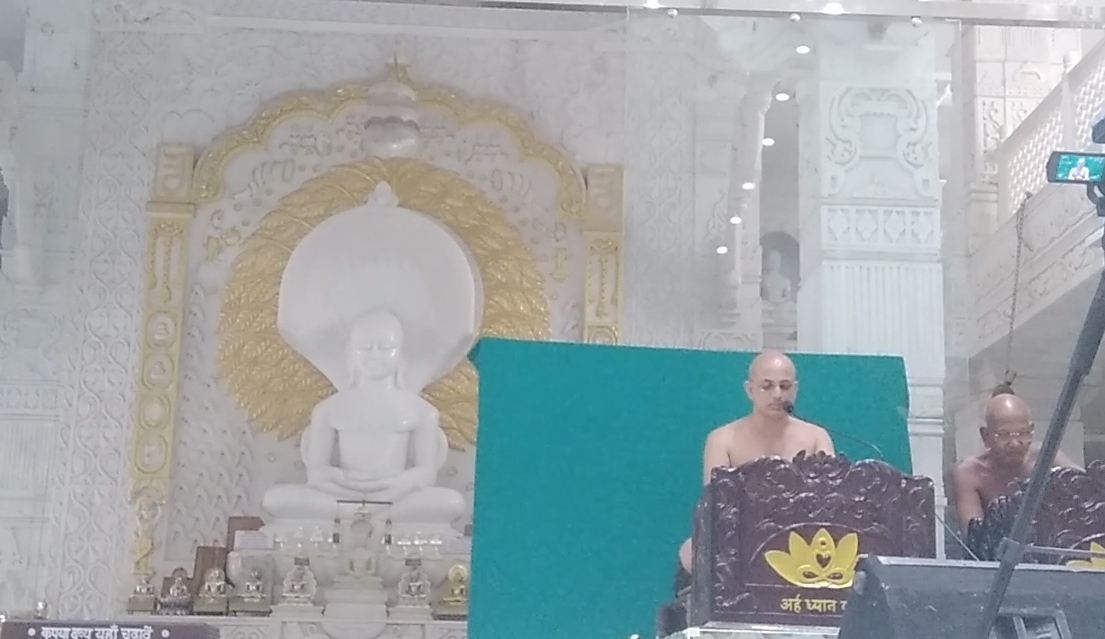
Jain Mandir Shahpura Jabalpur

There are seven Jain temples in Shahpura. Many tourist place located around Shahpura.

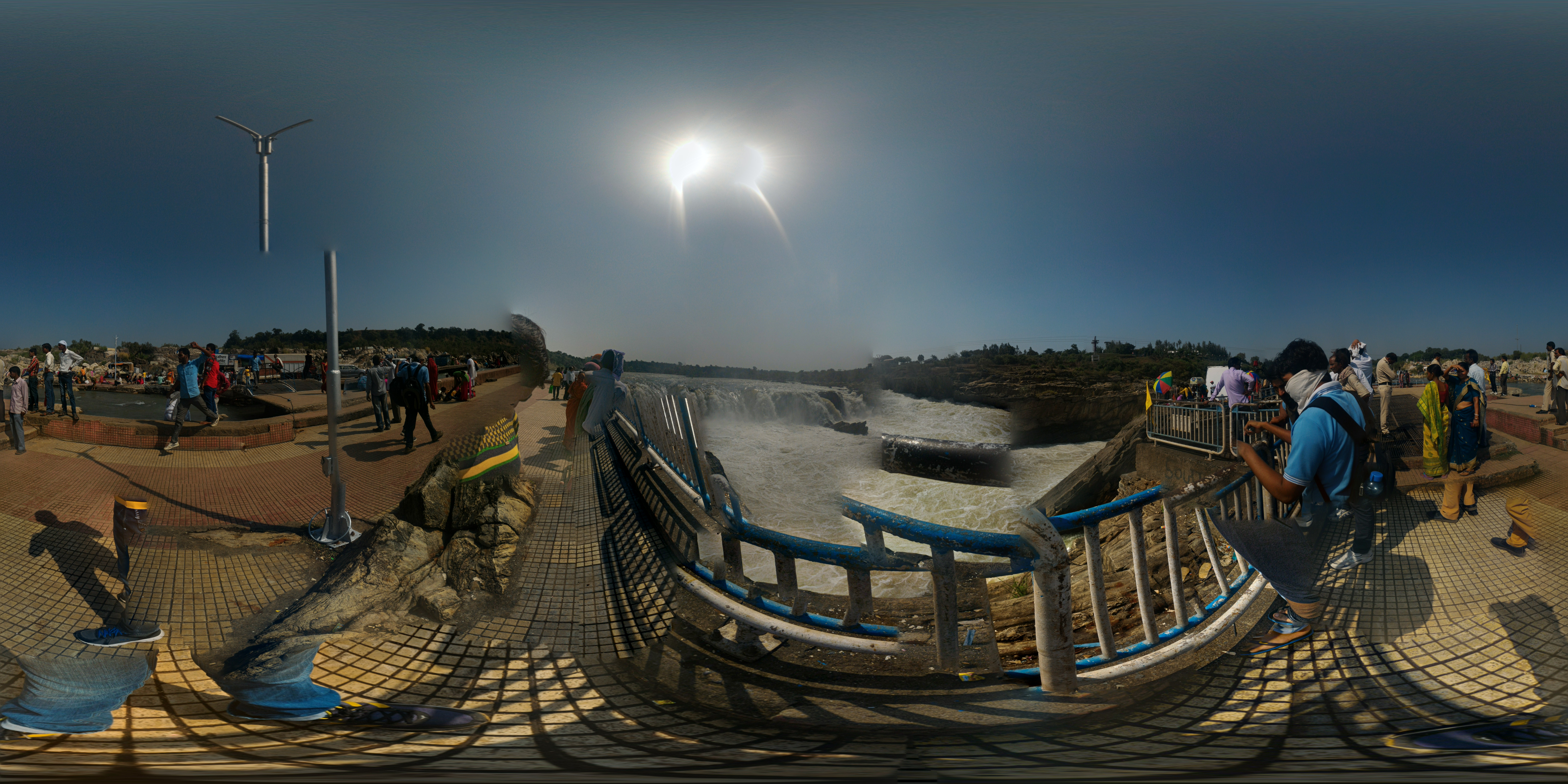
Bhedaghat Dhuandhar Waterfall

- Bhedaghat, 18 KM away

== Transportation ==
Shahpura is connected by railway and roadway . NH 45 is passed from Shahpura.Daily buses runs from here.

Bhitoni railway station give service to Shahpura town many train halts from here.
