= Deori =

Deori may refer to:

- Deori, Bilaspur district, a town in Chhattisgarh
- Deori, Gondia, a town in Maharashtra
- Deori, Sagar, a town in Madhya Pradesh
- Deori, Shahdol, a town in Madhya Pradesh
- Deori, Jabalpur, Jabalpur district, a town in Madhya Pradesh
- Deori block in Giridih district, Jharkhand
- Deori, Giridih, in Jharkhand
- Deori people of Assam
- Deori language, their language

== See also ==
- Deoria (disambiguation)
- Deuri (disambiguation)
