= Bilpura, Madhya Pradesh =

Bilpura
- Town
- Location in Madhya Pradesh, India Bilpura (India)
- Coordinates: 23°13′0″N 79°59′40″E
- Country: India
- State: Madhya Pradesh
- District: Jabalpur

Population (2001)
  - Total: 11,812

Languages
  - Official: Hindi
- Time zone: UTC+5:30 (IST)
- ISO 3166 code: IN-MP
- Vehicle registration: MP-MP

Bilpura is a census town in Jabalpur district in the state of Madhya Pradesh, India.

== Demographics ==
As of 2001 India census, Bilpura had a population of 11,812. Males constitute 53% of the population and females 47%. Bilpura has an average literacy rate of 70%, higher than the national average of 59.5%; with male literacy of 78% and female literacy of 60%. 13% of the population is under 6 years of age.
