= Suhagi =

- Census town
- Location in Madhya Pradesh, India Suhagi (India)
- Coordinates: 23.21867°N 79.95634°E
- Country: India
- State: Madhya Pradesh
- District: Jabalpur

Population (2001)
  - Total: 8,371

Languages
  - Official: Hindi
- Time zone: UTC+5:30 (IST)
- ISO 3166 code: IN-MP
- Vehicle registration: MP

Suhagi is a census town in Jabalpur district in the Indian state of Madhya Pradesh.

== Demographics ==
As of 2001 India census, Suhagi had a population of 8,371. Males constitute 53% of the population and females 47%. Suhagi has an average literacy rate of 44%, lower than the national average of 59.5%: male literacy is 62%, and female literacy is 24%. In Suhagi, 12% of the population is under 6 years of age.
