= Deori, Bilaspur district =

Deori
- city
- Location in Chhattisgarh, India Deori (India)
- Coordinates: 21.45°N 82.62°E
- Country: India
- State: Chhattisgarh
- District: Bilaspur
- Elevation: 247 m (810 ft)

Population (2001)
  - Total: 11,636

Languages
  - Official: Hindi, Chhattisgarhi
- Time zone: UTC+5:30 (IST)
- Vehicle registration: CG

See Deori (disambiguation) for disambiguation

Deori is a census town in Bilaspur district in the state of Chhattisgarh, India.

== Geography ==
Deori is located at 21.45°N 82.62°E. It has an average elevation of 247 metres (810 feet).

== Demographics ==
As of 2001 India census, Deori had a population of 11,636. Males constitute 52% of the population and females 48%. Deori has an average literacy rate of 62%, higher than the national average of 59.5%: male literacy is 72% and, female literacy is 52%. In Deori, 16% of the population is under 6 years of age.
