= Deori, Shahdol =

Deori
- Census town
- Location in Madhya Pradesh, India Deori (India)
- Coordinates: 21.45°N 80.85°E
- Country: India
- State: Madhya Pradesh
- District: Shahdol
- Elevation: 360 m (1,180 ft)

Population (2001)
  - Total: 5,761

Languages
  - Official: Hindi
- Time zone: UTC+5:30 (IST)
- ISO 3166 code: IN-MP
- Vehicle registration: MP

See Deori (disambiguation) for disambiguation

Deori is a census town in Shahdol district in the state of Madhya Pradesh, India.

== Geography ==
Deori is located at 21.45°N 80.85°E. It has an average elevation of 360 metres (1181 feet).

== Demographics ==
As of 2001 India census, Deori had a population of 5761. Males constitute 53% of the population and females 47%. Deori has an average literacy rate of 68%, higher than the national average of 59.5%: male literacy is 77% and, female literacy is 57%. In Deori, 14% of the population is under 6 years of age.
