= Deora =

Deora may refer to:

- Deora (clan), a Rajput clan in India
- Deora (custom car), a customized 1965 Dodge A100 pickup truck

== Places ==
- Deora, Colorado, U.S., an unincorporated community
- Deora, North 24 Parganas, a census town in West Bengal, India

== People ==
- Diora or Deora (died c. 781–785), Bishop of Rochester
- Milind Deora (born 1975), Indian politician from Maharashtra
- Mukul Deora (born 1974), Indian film producer
- Murli Deora (1937–2014), Indian politician, father of Milind
- Thakur Prithvi Singh Deora (c. 1934–2019), Indian politician from Rajasthan

== See also ==
- Deoria (disambiguation)
