= Devaria =

Devaria may refer to:

- Devaria, Kachchh, a village in Kutch, Gujarat, India
- Devaria, Saurashtra, a village in Saurashtra, Gujarat, India
- Deoria district, a district of Uttar Pradesh, India also called Devaria
- Deoria, Uttar Pradesh, a town in Uttar Pradesh, India also called Devaria

== See also ==
- Deoria (disambiguation)
