= Deuri =

Deuri may refer to:

- Deuri, Nepal, a village in Sagarmatha Zone, Nepal
- Deori people, a tribe from northeast India, mainly found in Assam
- Deori language, spoken by them
- Deuri (Illyrian tribe), an ancient Illyrian tribe

== See also ==
- Deori (disambiguation)
