= Deoria =

Deoria may refer to these places in India:

- Deoria, Uttar Pradesh, a city and one of five tehsils of Deoria district
- Deoria district
  - Deoria Sadar railway station
- Deoria (Assembly constituency)
- Deoria (Lok Sabha constituency)

== See also ==
- Deori (disambiguation)
- Deora (disambiguation)
- Devaria (disambiguation)
