= Dhuandhar Falls =

Waterfall in Madhya Pradesh, India

Coordinates: 23°7′34.7″N 79°48′27.37″E

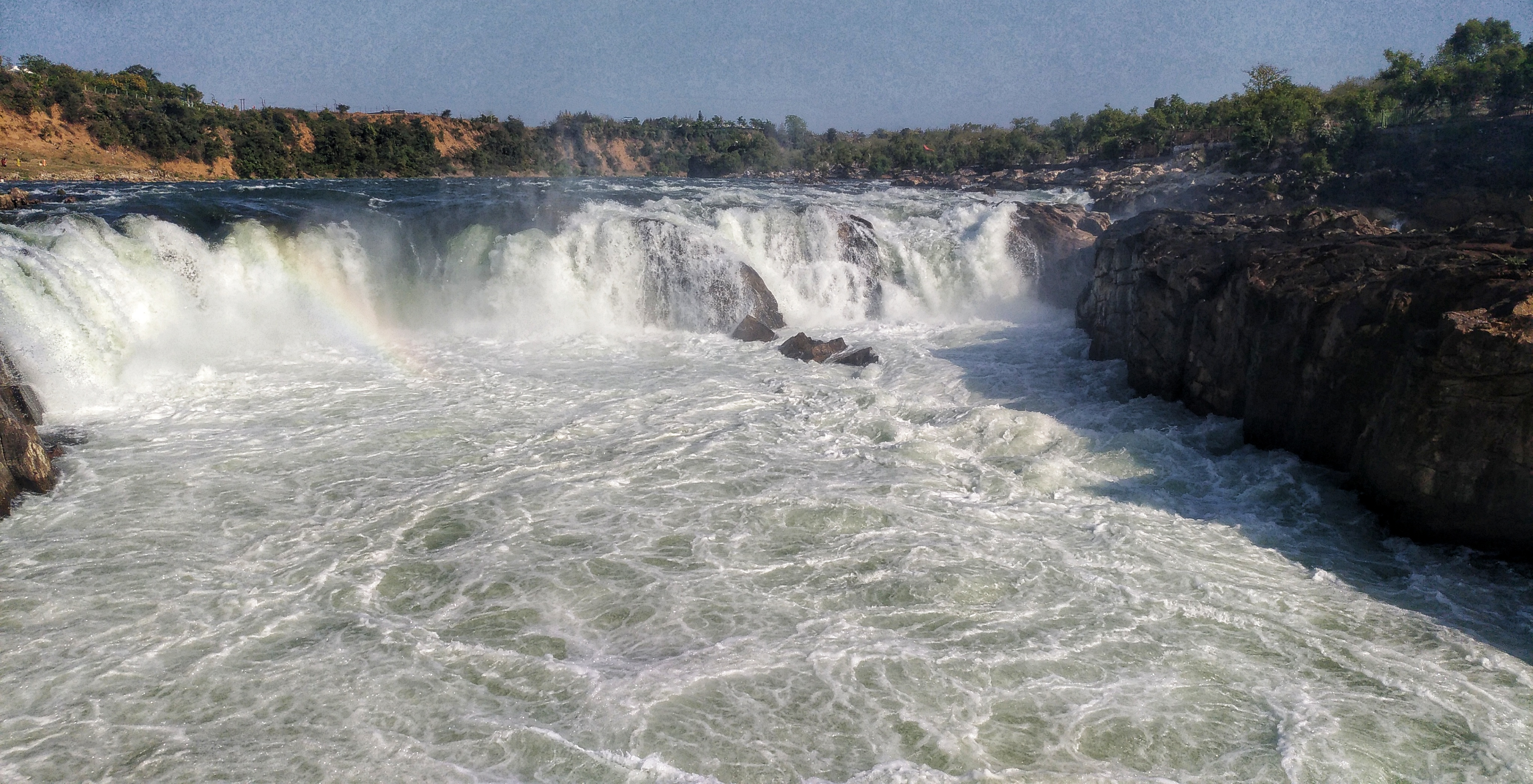
- Dhuandhar Waterfalls in Bhedaghat, India as viewed from east side.
- Location: Jabalpur district, Madhya Pradesh

The Dhuandhar Falls (धुआंधार) is a waterfall in Jabalpur district in the Indian state of Madhya Pradesh.

== Etymology ==
The word 'Dhuandhar' is derived from two Hindi words - Dhuan (smoke) and Dhar (flow), meaning a waterfall with a smoky atmosphere, caused by the formation of water vapour or the smoke cascade.

== The Falls ==
The Dhuandhar Falls is located on the Narmada River in Bhedaghat and are 30 meters high. The Narmada River, making its way through the world-famous Marble Rocks, narrows down and then plunges into a waterfall known as Dhuandhar. The plunge, which creates a bouncing mass of mist, is so powerful that its roar can be heard from a far distance.

Boating is available at Dhuandhar Falls.

== Cable car service at Dhuandhar Waterfalls ==
One can access Dhuandhar waterfalls from the east bank as well as the west bank of the Narmada River. To view the other side of Dhuandhar Falls, one must take the cable car service available at Bhedaghat. The ropeway facility starts from the east bank of the Narmada River, crosses the river and then drops tourists off at the river's west bank.

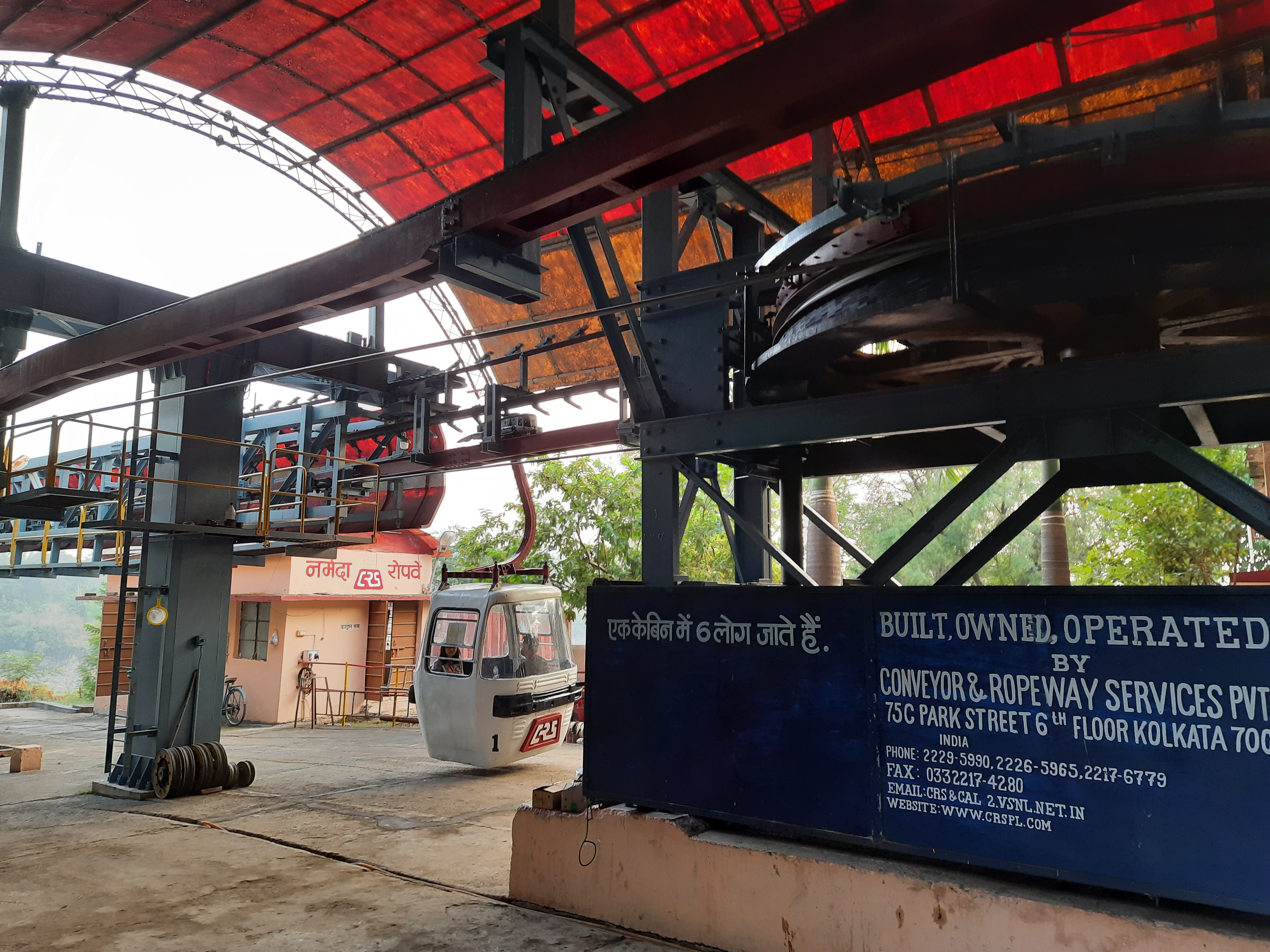
Cable car service at Dhuandhar Falls

== Gallery ==
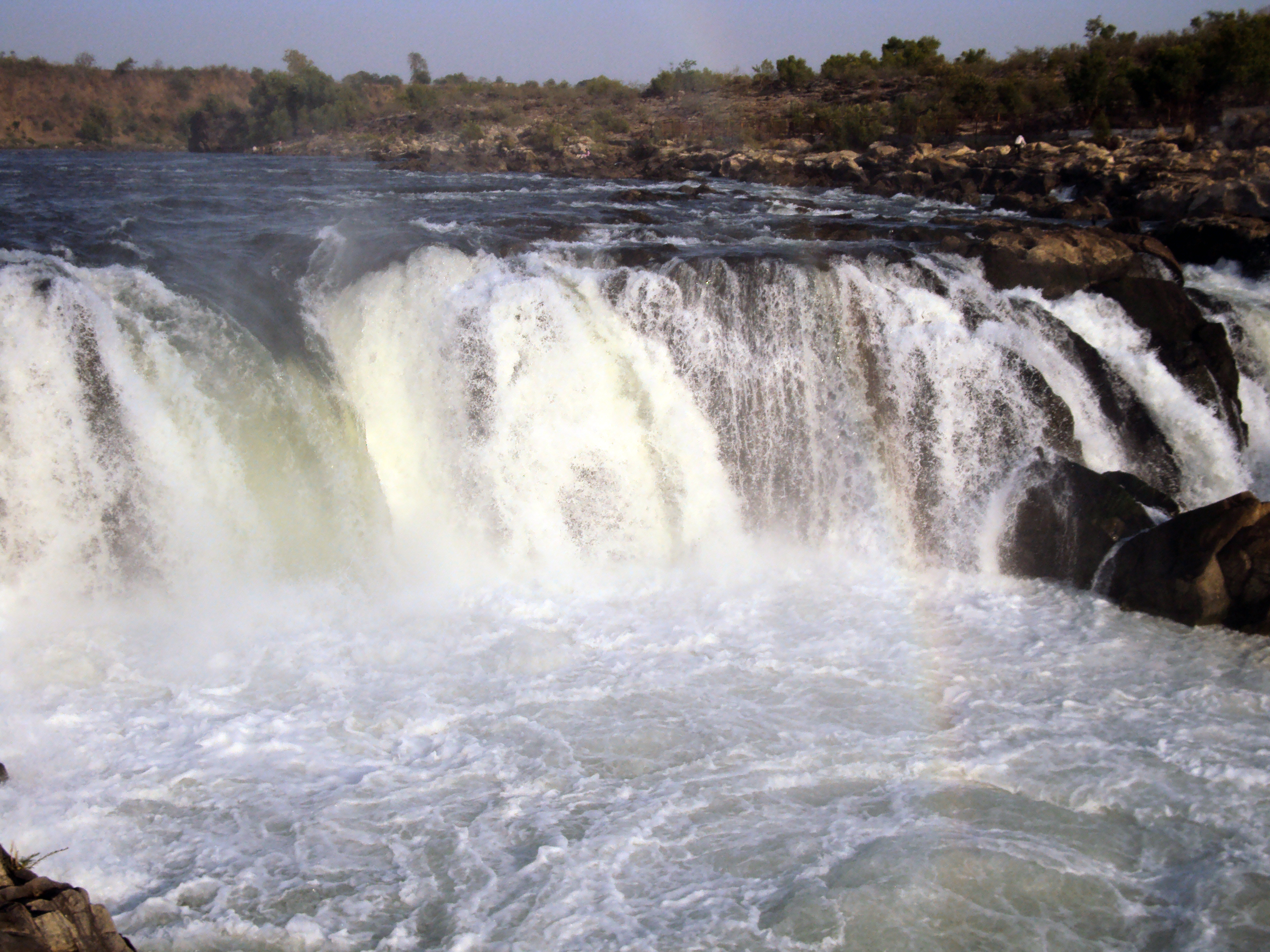
Dhuandhar (meaning smoke-filled) waterfalls, situated at Bhedaghat, Jabalpur, Madhya Pradesh, India.

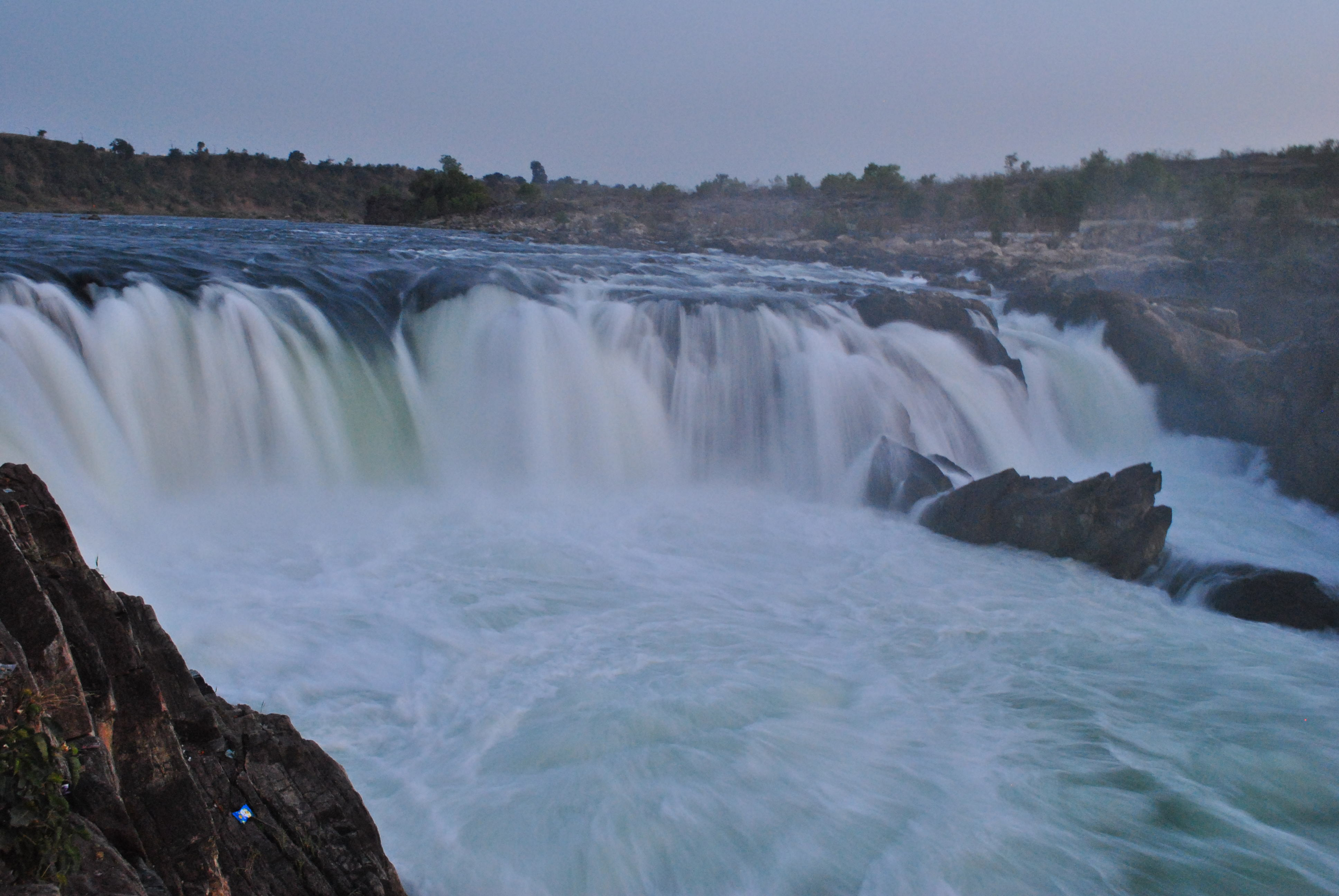
February 2011

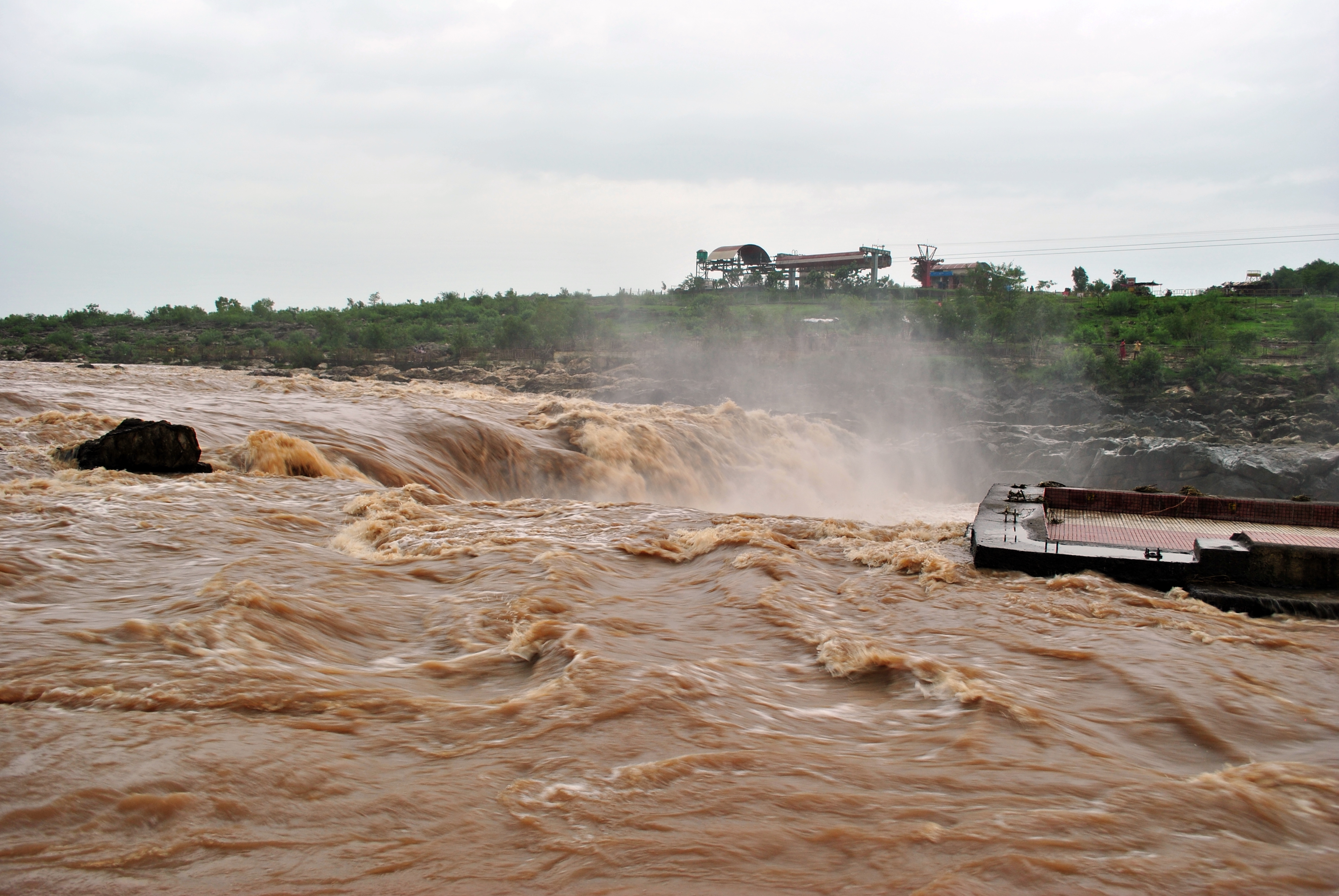
Side view of the Dhuandhar Falls seen during the monsoon season.

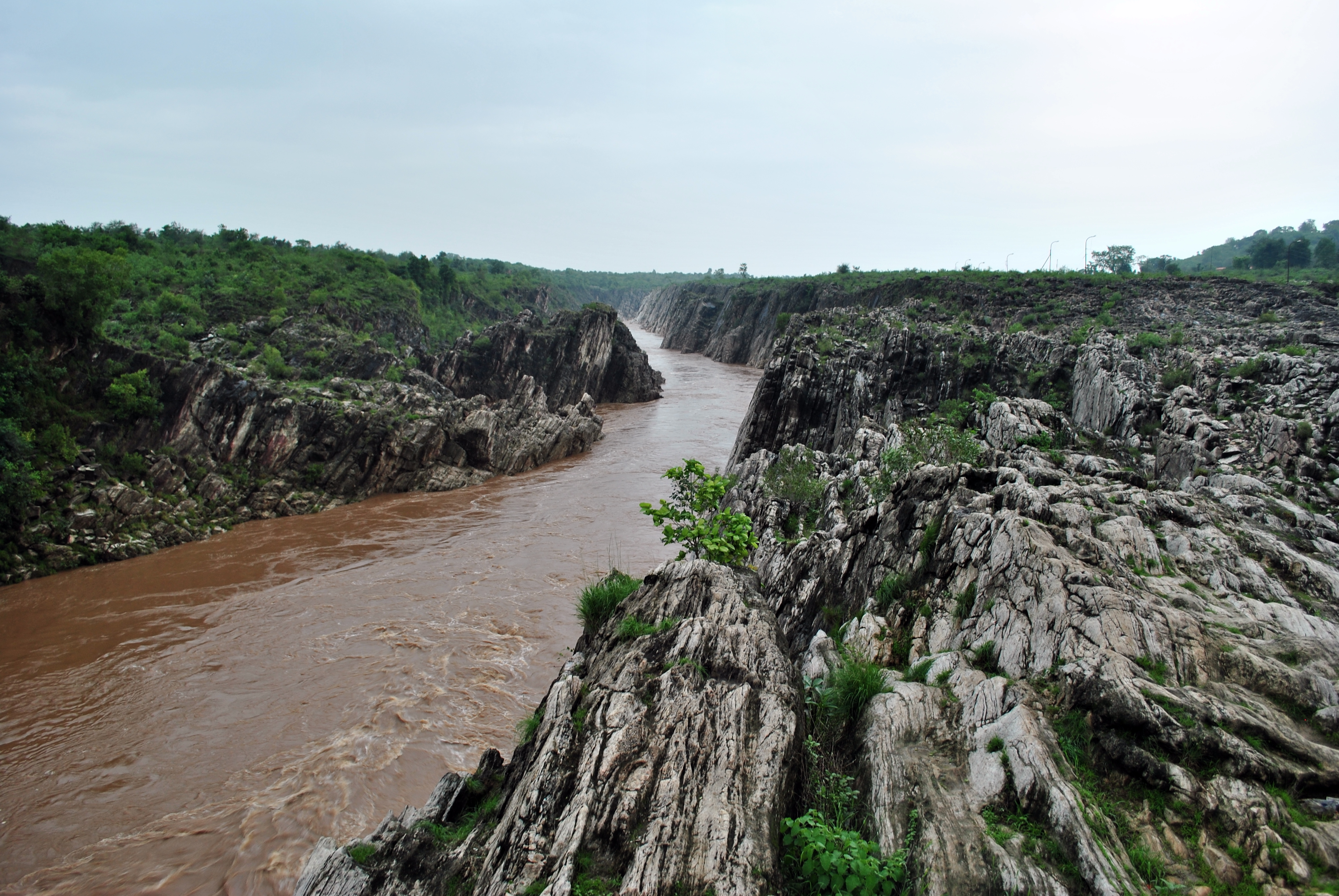
Dhuandhar Falls from a distance.

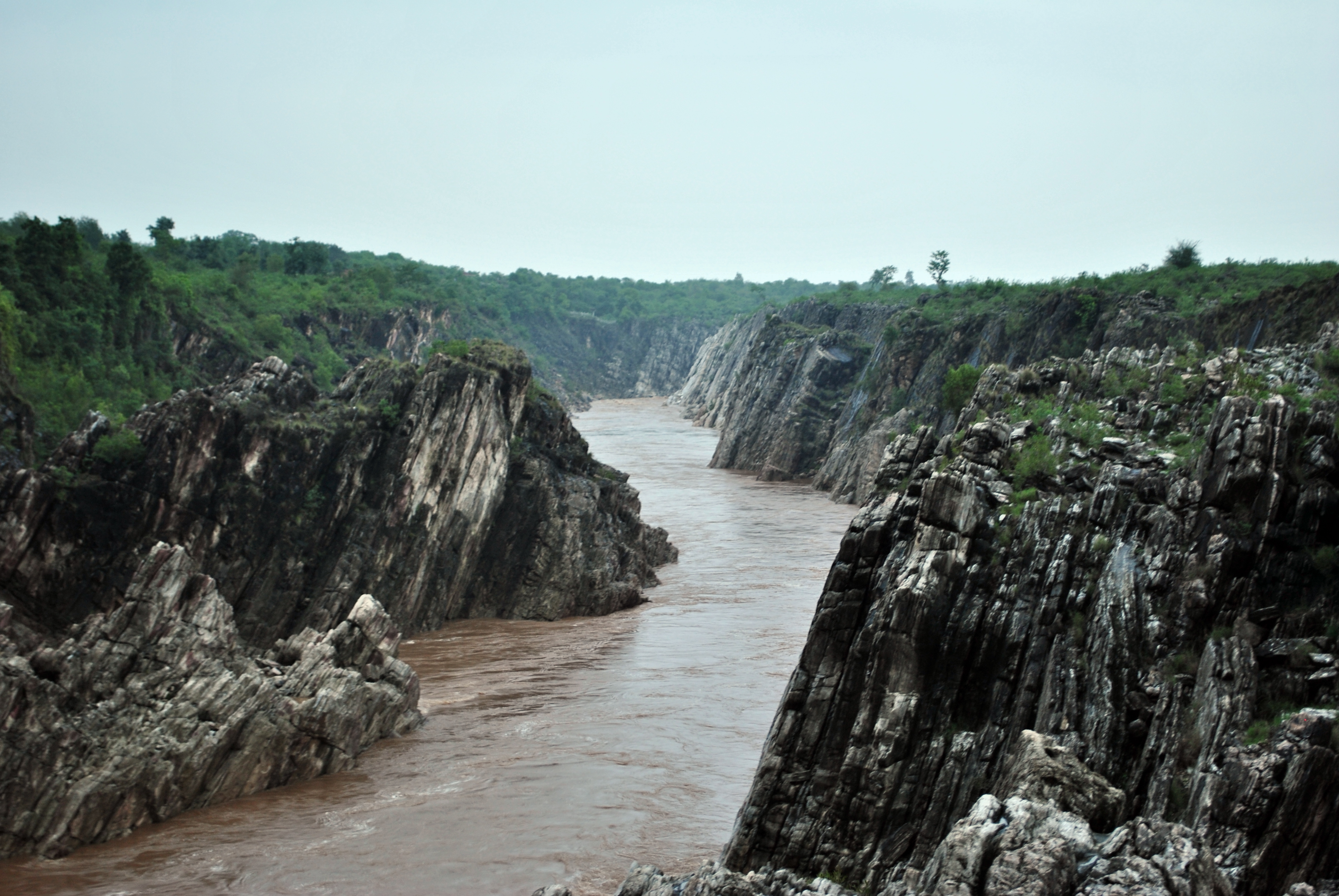
Downstream Narmada River flowing after the Dhuandhar Falls.

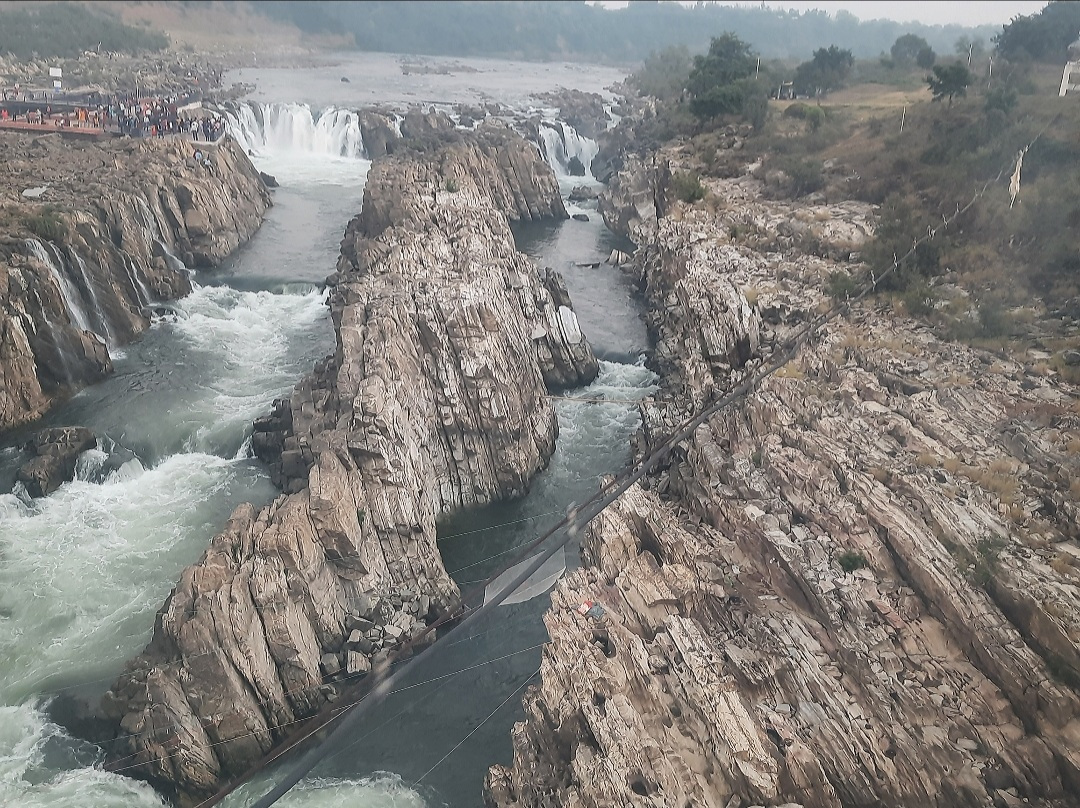
Dhuandhar Falls, November 2021

== See also ==
- List of waterfalls
- List of waterfalls in India
