= Bhedaghat =

- Town
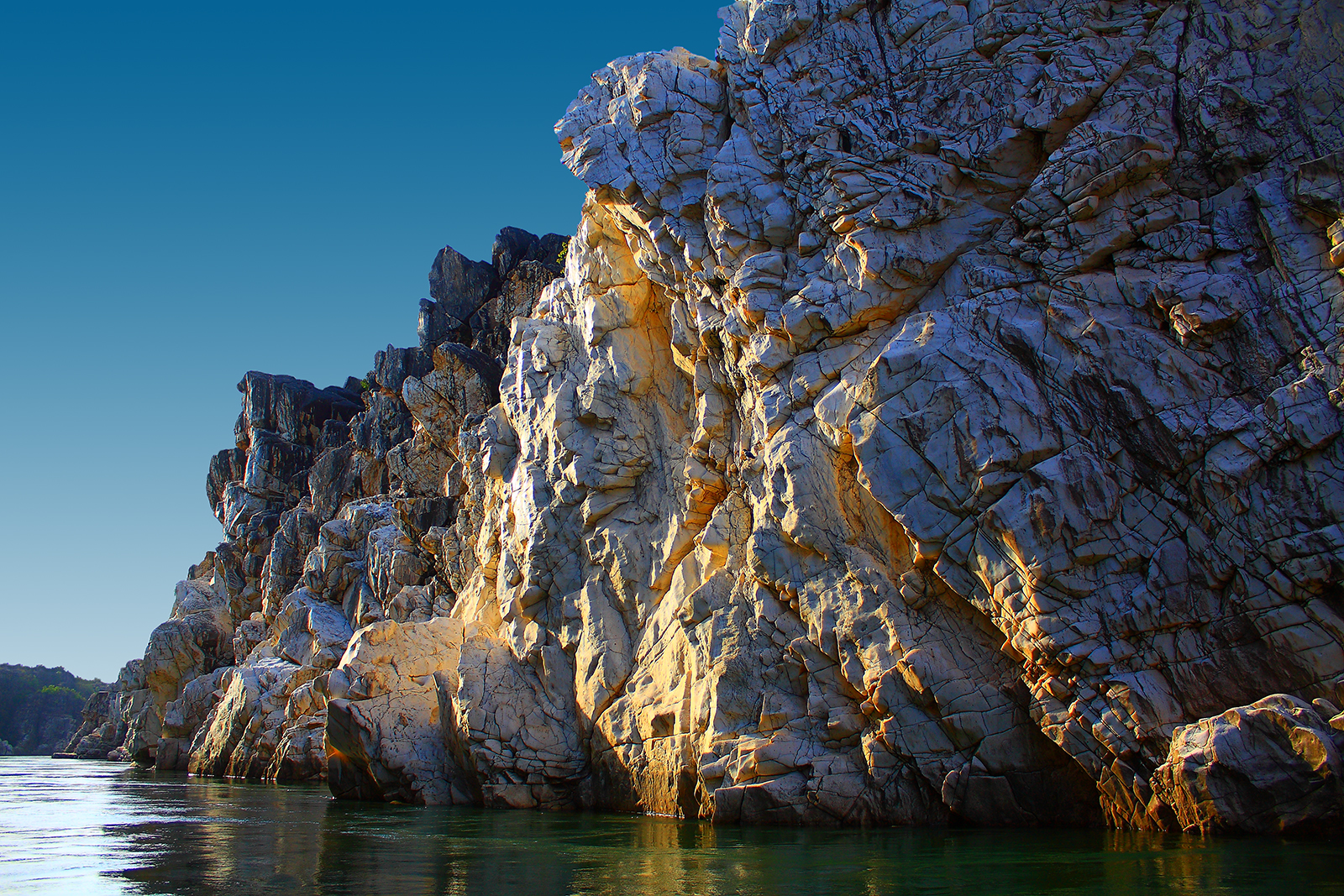
- Bhedaghat, Jabalpur

- Location in Madhya Pradesh, India
- Coordinates: 23.132°N 79.801°E
- Country: India
- State: Madhya Pradesh
- District: Jabalpur

Population (2001)
  - Total: 1,840

Languages
  - Official: Hindi
- Time zone: UTC+5:30 (IST)

Bhedaghat is a town and a nagar panchayat in Jabalpur district in the state of Madhya Pradesh, India. It is situated by the side of river Narmada and is approximately 20 km from Jabalpur city. Bhedaghat is known for the high marble rocks making a valley through which river Narmada flows. The site is also home to Dhuandhar Falls, named for its smoky appearance as the water crashes down, creating a mist that looks like rising steam.

The Marble Rocks at Bhedaghat form one of only three river-carved gorges in the world cut entirely through pure marble ranking alongside Taroko Gorge in Taiwan and Trigrad Gorge in Bulgaria. Stretching approximately 8 km along the Narmada River, the gorge's high marble cliffs were slowly shaped over millions of years by the flowing river.

== Demographics ==
As of 2001 India census, Bhedaghat had a population of 1840. Males constitute 53% of the population and females 47%. Bhedaghat has an average literacy rate of 63%, higher than the national average of 59.5%; with male literacy of 71% and female literacy of 53%. 16% of the population is under 7 years of age.

== Transport ==
The closest rail link is Bhedaghat Railway Station with Jabalpur Railway Station being a major station 21 km away. From Jabalpur, one can easily hire an auto or cab to Bhedaghat, which is around 20 km from the city center. The nearest airport is Jabalpur Airport about 34 km away

== Portrayals in popular culture ==
- 1895: In the Rudyard Kipling story "Red Dog" from The Second Jungle Book, Kaa shows Mowgli a marble gorge by a river, based on the gorge of Bhedaghat, that is inhabited by an enormous colony of bees to help aid in his fight against the rampaging dholes advancing on the jungle, intending to drive them over the cliffs to be stung by the bees. The real life gorge in Bhedaghat has been known to serve as a home for wild colonies of bees, the hives of which can be seen from the river Narmada.
- 1961: The hit song "O Basanti Pawan Paagal" from the film Jis Desh Mein Ganga Behti Hai starring Raj Kapoor and Padmini was shot at Bhedaghat.
- 1973: The Hindi film Bobby uses Bhedaghat as the setting of its climactic scene.
- 1974: The Hindi film Pran Jaye Par Vachan Na Jaye starring Sunil Dutt, Rekha, Premnath, Jeevan, Bindu, Madan Puri, and Ranjeet used Bhedaghat as the location of its climax.
- 2001: The song "Raat Ka Nasha Abhi" from the Hindi film Asoka was shot in Bhedaghat among the marble rocks by the Narmada River.
- 2013: The opening episode of the STAR Plus TV series Mahabharata features Bhedaghat as a location where Shantanu and Satyavati meets.
- 2016: The crocodile fight scenes of the Hindi film Mohenjo Daro are shot at Bhedaghat.
- 2018: The scenes of Karan going to meet Tilewali Maa from the Gujarati film Reva are shot at Bhedaghat.
- 2023: Scenes of Hindi movie Dunki directed by Rajkumar Hirani and starring Shah Rukh Khan are shot at Bhedaghat.

== Politics ==
In 2011 assembly elections, congress registered a win here.
