= Gwarighat =

- city
- Location in Madhya Pradesh, India Gwarighat (India)
- Coordinates: 23°6′29″N 79°55′42″E
- Country: India
- State: Madhya Pradesh
- District: Jabalpur

Languages
  - Official: Hindi
- Time zone: UTC+5:30 (IST)
- ISO 3166 code: IN-MP
- Vehicle registration: MP

Gwarighat is a colony on the banks of the river Narmada in the city of Jabalpur in Madhya Pradesh, India. Hindus perform their cremation rites here as per Garuda Purana. It is associated with Hindu Puranas, also; due to the presence of Narmada Sidh Kund, near Uma Ghat, wherein renowned Rishis performed Tapas (Indian religions), and it is believed that people are cured of their ailments here. Maa Narmada Temple is also situated here, where Narmada Aarti, is performed in the evenings.

Being a Hindu site for cremation rites and other religious ceremonies there are other castes religious monuments here too; as Gurdwara Gwari Ghat Saheb of Guru Nanak, the founder of Sikhism, who reformed several thugs and criminals here, a temple and ashram dedicated to Sai Baba followers, and Jain temple. Madan Mahal Rani Durgawati Fort is also associated with religious tourism here.

During Kartik (month), a huge fair is held at Gwarighat, which is supported by the local government, who also take care of the temples here, due to their antiquity.

Ram Nath Kovind (President of India), visited Jabalpur on 6 March 2021 to attend the Narmada aarti at Gwarighat on the banks of the river Narmada.
