= Marble Rocks =

Gorge and fall of the Narmada River

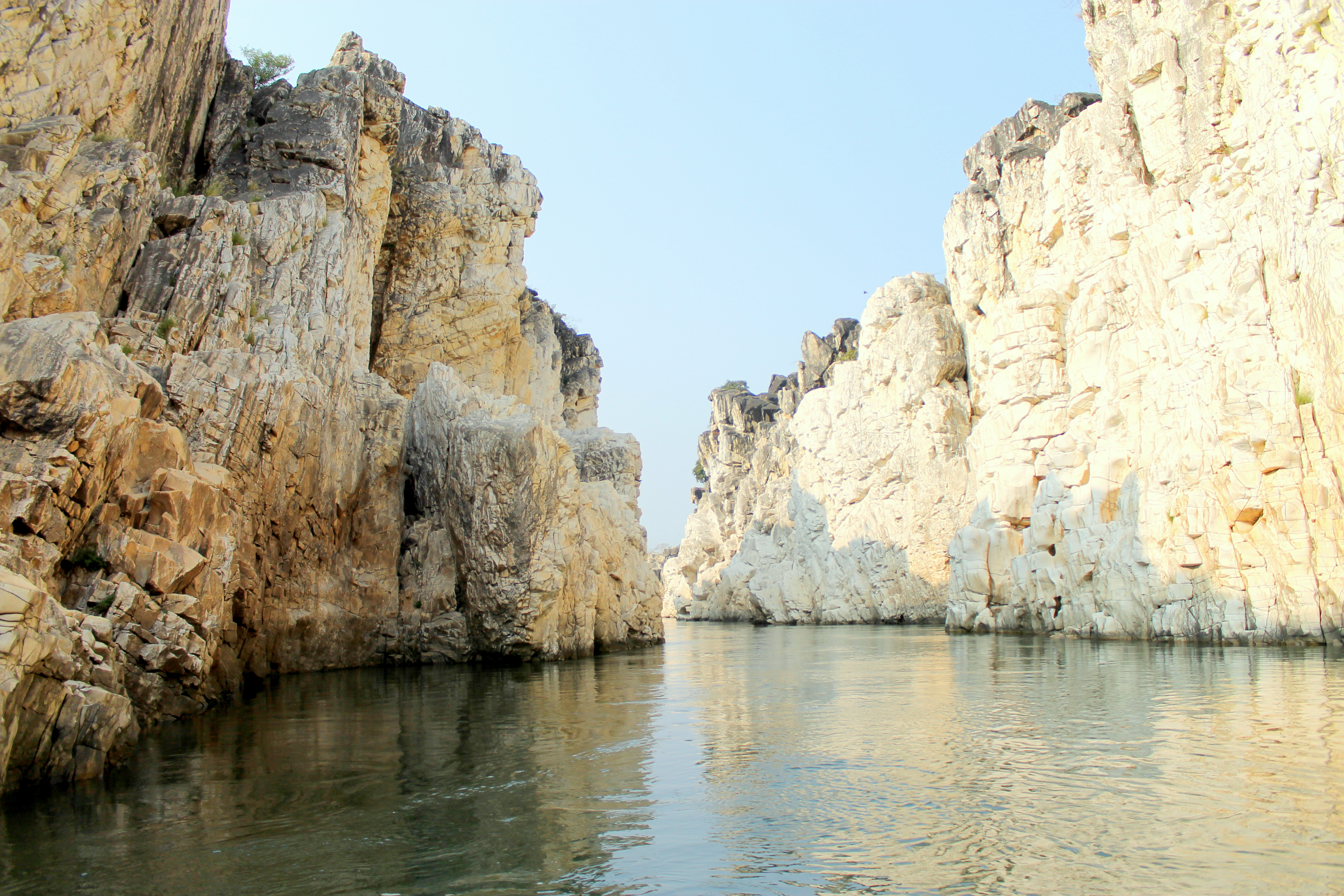
- Marble Rocks at Bhedaghat near Jabalpur, India

- Location within Madhya Pradesh Location within India
- Length: 3 kilometres (1.9 mi)

Geography
- Location: Bhedaghat, Jabalpur, Madhya Pradesh, India
- Coordinates: 23°07′52″N 79°47′47″E
- Interactive map of Marble Rocks

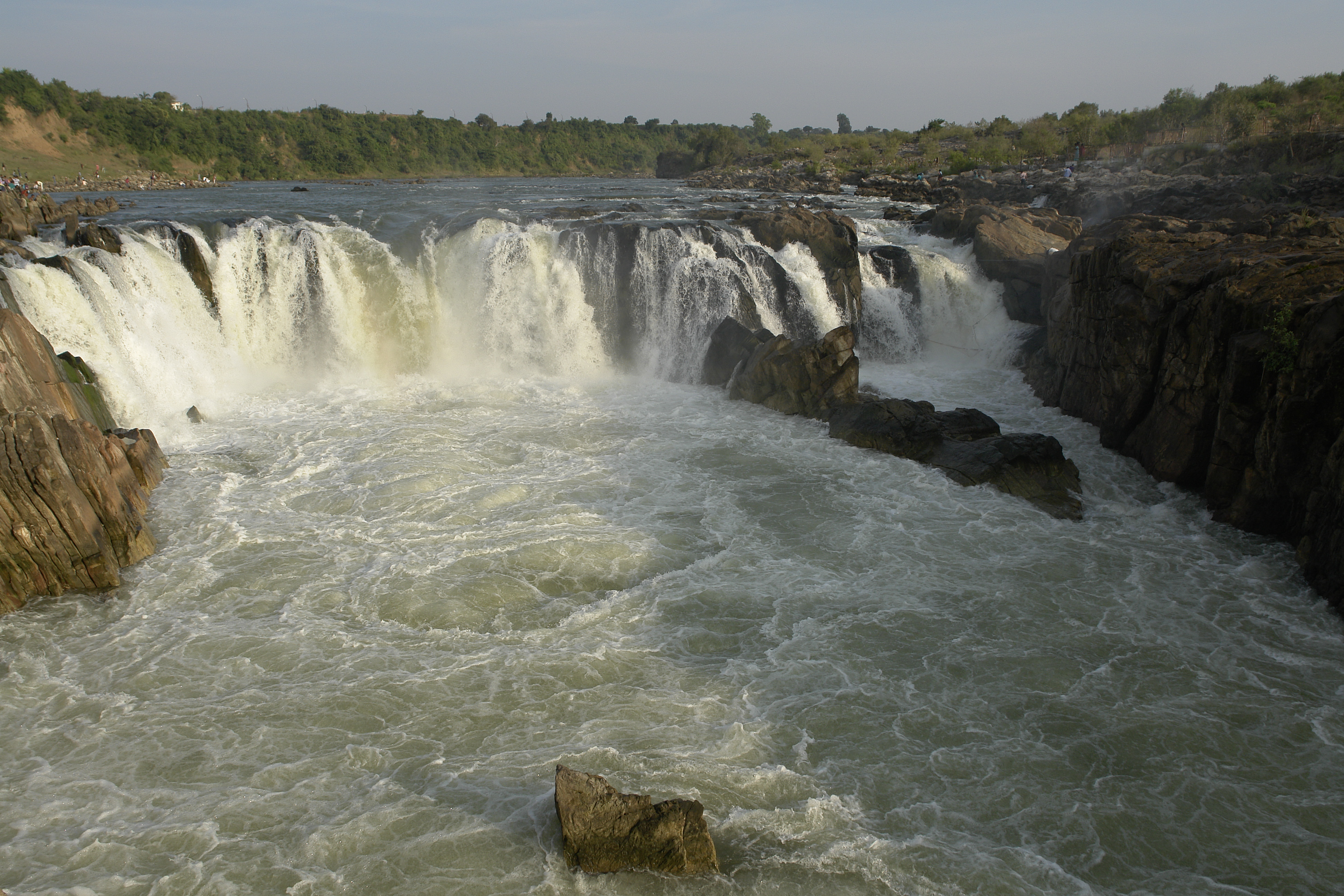
Dhuandhar Falls of Narmada River in Marble Rocks.

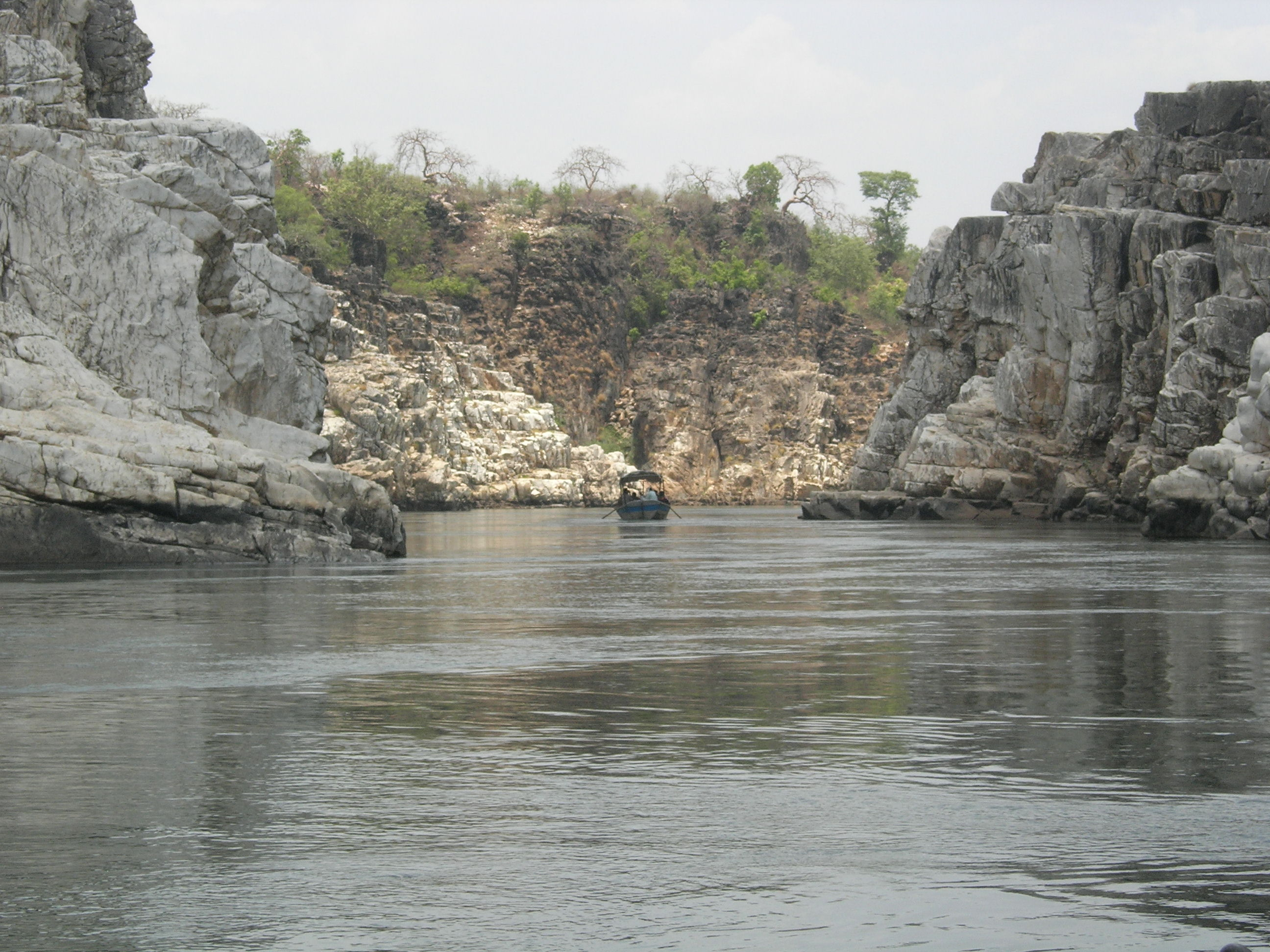
Boating during sacred Purnima.

The Marble Rocks is an area along the Narmada River in central India near the city of Jabalpur; in Bhedaghat of Jabalpur District, in the state of Madhya Pradesh. The river has carved the soft marble, creating a beautiful gorge of about 8 km (5.0 mi) in length. It is a popular Indian tourist destination. The local marble is mined and carved into various figures and transported all over India.

== Geography ==
The Marble Rocks are a gorge along part of the Narmada River’s 1,077 km (669.2 mi) path through Madhya Pradesh. Earlier, the gorge was narrow in size and hence, monkeys could cross over from one side to another. This gave the gorge its local name- Bandar Kudni (meaning monkeys' jumping place). The white marbles are predominantly rich in magnesium and are closer in hardness to soapstone. This softness allows them to be carved. The area also contains blue and brown coloured marble.

== Attractions ==
The area has many tourist activities. There is a cable car to take visitors across the gorge, row boats for guided tours of the river downstream of the falls, and many small shops filled with crafts made from local materials. Purnima is considered to be the best time for boating, especially during Kojagari Puja on Sharad Purnima, wherein boating is believed to be healing for the body and soul. On Kaumudi celebration as it is also called, it is believed that the moon showers elixir or amrit on Earth through its beams, as the moon and the earth are at a closer distance on Sharad Purnima night. This is believed to give the moonlight healing properties which are said to nourish the body and soul of an individual. The healing properties of moonlight on Purnima is supposed to shower Amrit Varsha (Elixir shower) on the Narmada River which meanders through the pristine rocks. Both bathing and boating are also considered sacred on Kartik Purnima in the holy Kartik (month).
