= Gyan Ganga Institute of Technology and Sciences =

Gyan Ganga Institute of Technology & Sciences
- Motto: विद्या अमृतम् अश्नुते
- Motto in English: knowledge leads to immortality
- Type: Private Autonomous Institute
- Established: 2003; 23 years ago
- Parent institution: Gyan Ganga Group of Institutions
- Affiliations: Rajiv Gandhi Proudyogiki Vishwavidyalaya
- Chairman: Dr Rajneet Jain
- Principal: Dr. Ashok Kumar Verma
- Location: Jabalpur, Madhya Pradesh, India; 23°07′45″N 79°52′29″E
- Campus: Urban, 10.2 acres (4.1 ha)
- Website: www.ggits.org

Gyan Ganga Institute of Technology and Sciences (GGITS) is an autonomous private technical and management institute located in Jabalpur, Madhya Pradesh, India. The institute was established in 2003 and is part of the Gyan Ganga Group of Institutions. It is affiliated with Rajiv Gandhi Proudyogiki Vishwavidyalaya (RGPV), Bhopal.

== Academics ==
GGITS offers undergraduate, postgraduate, and diploma programmes in engineering, pharmacy, and management. The institute is approved by the All India Council for Technical Education (AICTE) and has several programmes accredited by the National Board of Accreditation (NBA). GGITS has been granted autonomous status by the RGPV and University Grants Commission (UGC).

== Rankings ==
National Institutional Ranking Framework (NIRF): Gyan Ganga Institute of Technology and Sciences (GGITS) was positioned in the 151–300 band in the Innovation Category of NIRF India Rankings 2023, conducted by the Ministry of Education, Government of India.

Atal Ranking of Institutions on Innovation Achievements (ARIIA): The institute was recognized as an ARIIA Performer Institute (Band "B", Rank 26–50) under the Private/Self-Financed Technical Institutions category at the national level by the Ministry of Education, Government of India, in 2021.

== Departments ==
=== Undergraduate ===
- Computer Science and Engineering
- Computer Science and Business Systems
- Artificial Intelligence and Machine Learning
- Data science
- Artificial Intelligence and Robotics
- Internet of Things (IoT), Cybersecurity and Blockchain
- Electronics and Communication Engineering
- Electrical Engineering
- Electrical and Electronics Engineering
- Mechanical Engineering
- Civil Engineering
- Pharmacy

=== Postgraduate ===
- M.Tech (Computer Science and Engineering)
- M.Tech (Energy Technology)
- M.Tech (Machine Design)
- M.Tech (Structural Engineering)
- Master of Business Administration (MBA)
- Master of Computer Applications (MCA)

== Campus ==
The campus of GGITS is spread over an area of about 10.2 acres in Jabalpur city. It features Wi-Fi connectivity, digital classrooms, laboratories, libraries, and hostels for both male and female students.

== Collaborations ==
MoU signing ceremony between Gyan Ganga Institute of Technology and Sciences and INTI International University, Malaysia in 2026

Gyan Ganga Institute of Technology and Sciences (GGITS), Jabalpur has established academic collaborations with national and international institutions. In June 2026, the institute signed a Memorandum of Understanding (MoU) with INTI International University, Malaysia, aimed at promoting academic cooperation between the two institutions.

The collaboration includes initiatives such as student exchange programmes, faculty exchange and development activities, joint research projects, academic publications, conferences, workshops and international learning opportunities.

== Research and activities ==
GGITS conducts technical workshops, hackathons, and industry-collaborative programs. The Gyan Ganga Group of Institutions partnered with Oracle Corporation through the Oracle Academy Cloud Program to organize a virtual web development competition for students, promoting innovation and hands-on learning.

== Student life ==
Students at GGITS participate in various technical societies, cultural clubs, and sports events. The annual techno-cultural fest “Srijan” is one of the major events organized by the institution each year.

== Placements ==
The Training and Placement Cell of GGITS coordinates campus recruitment and internship programs with various national and multinational companies. The institute reports consistent placement results in core engineering and IT sectors.
