= Jabalpur district =

Coordinates: 23°09′36″N 79°56′24″E

- District of Madhya Pradesh
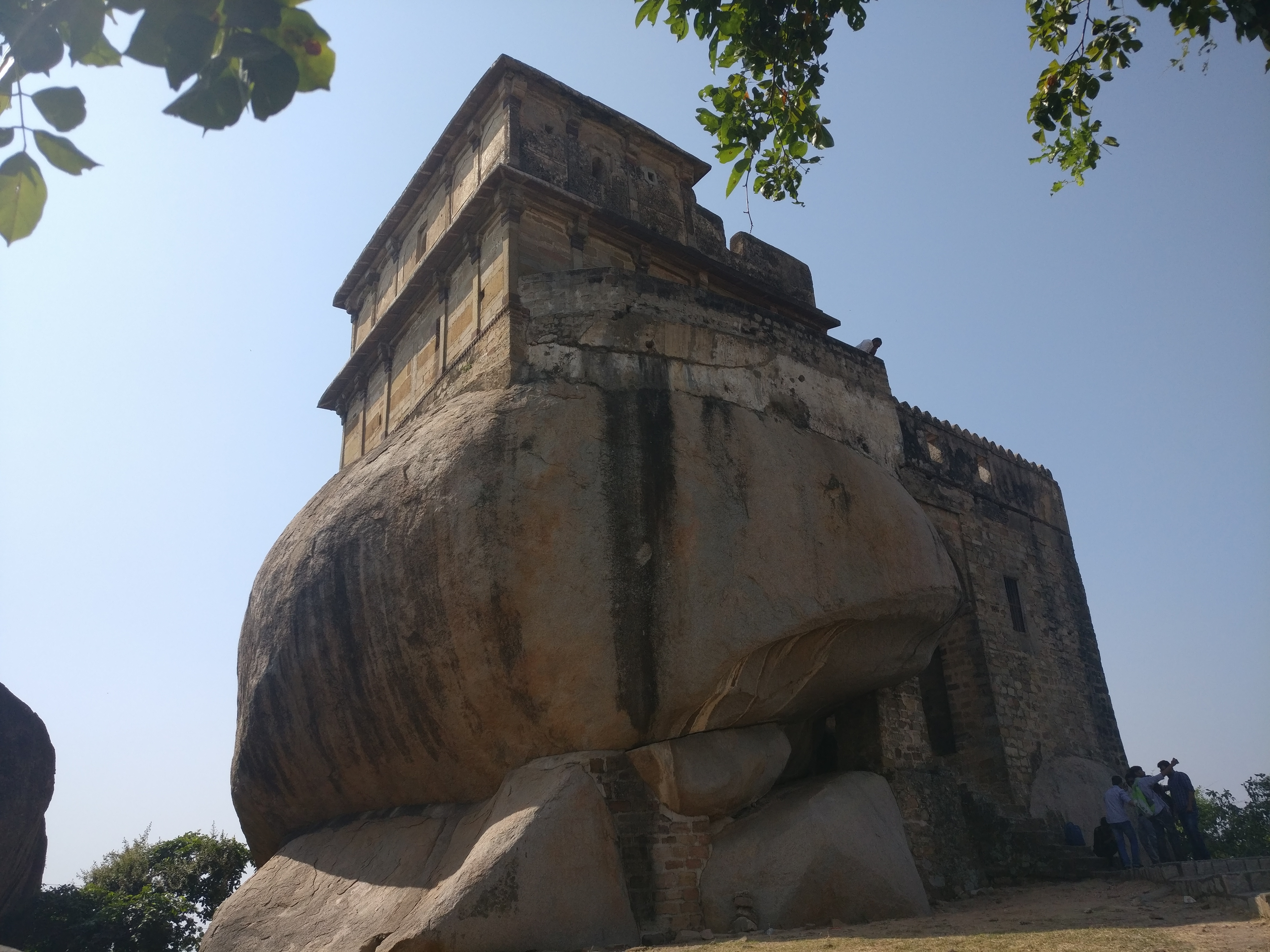
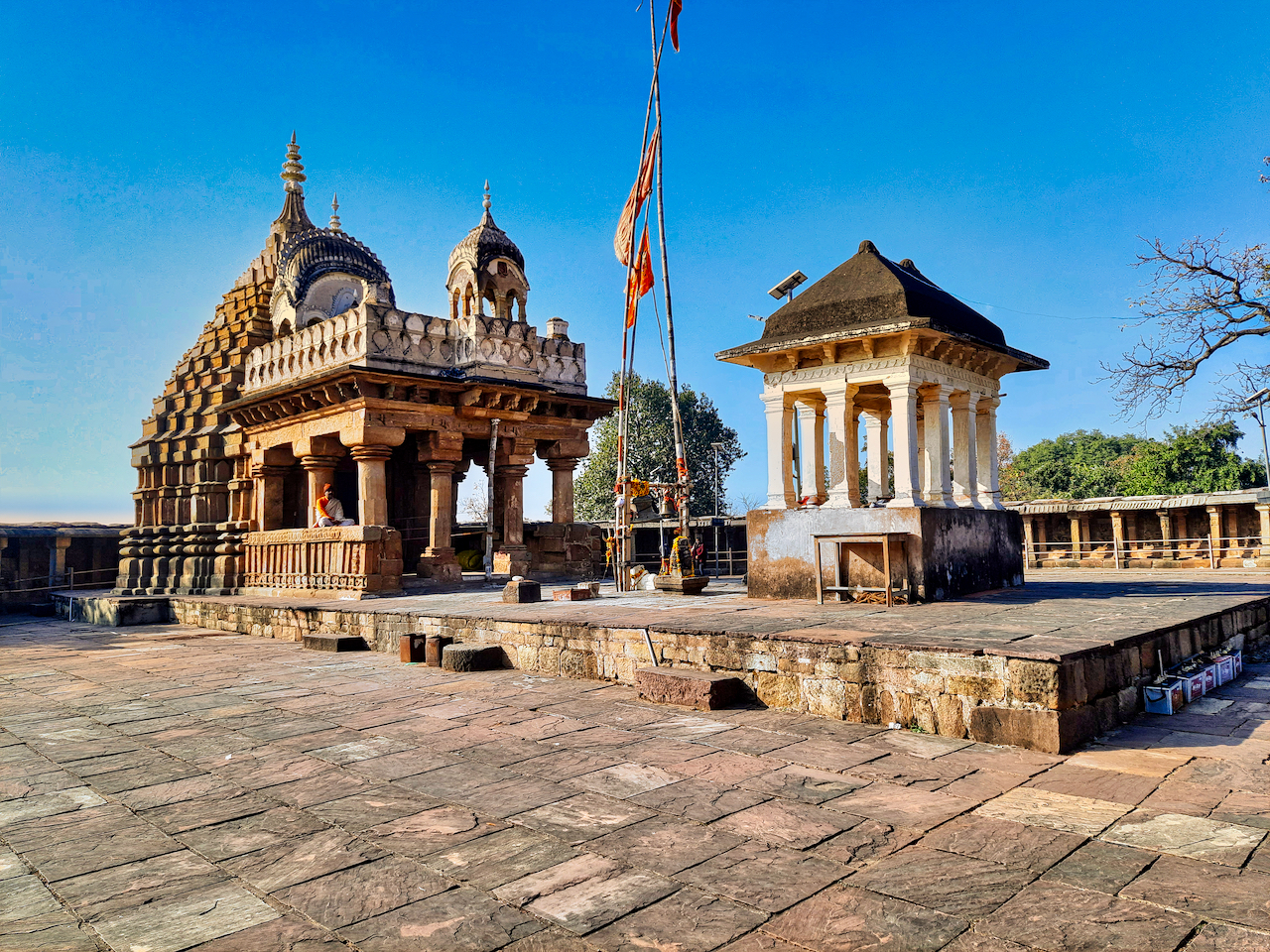
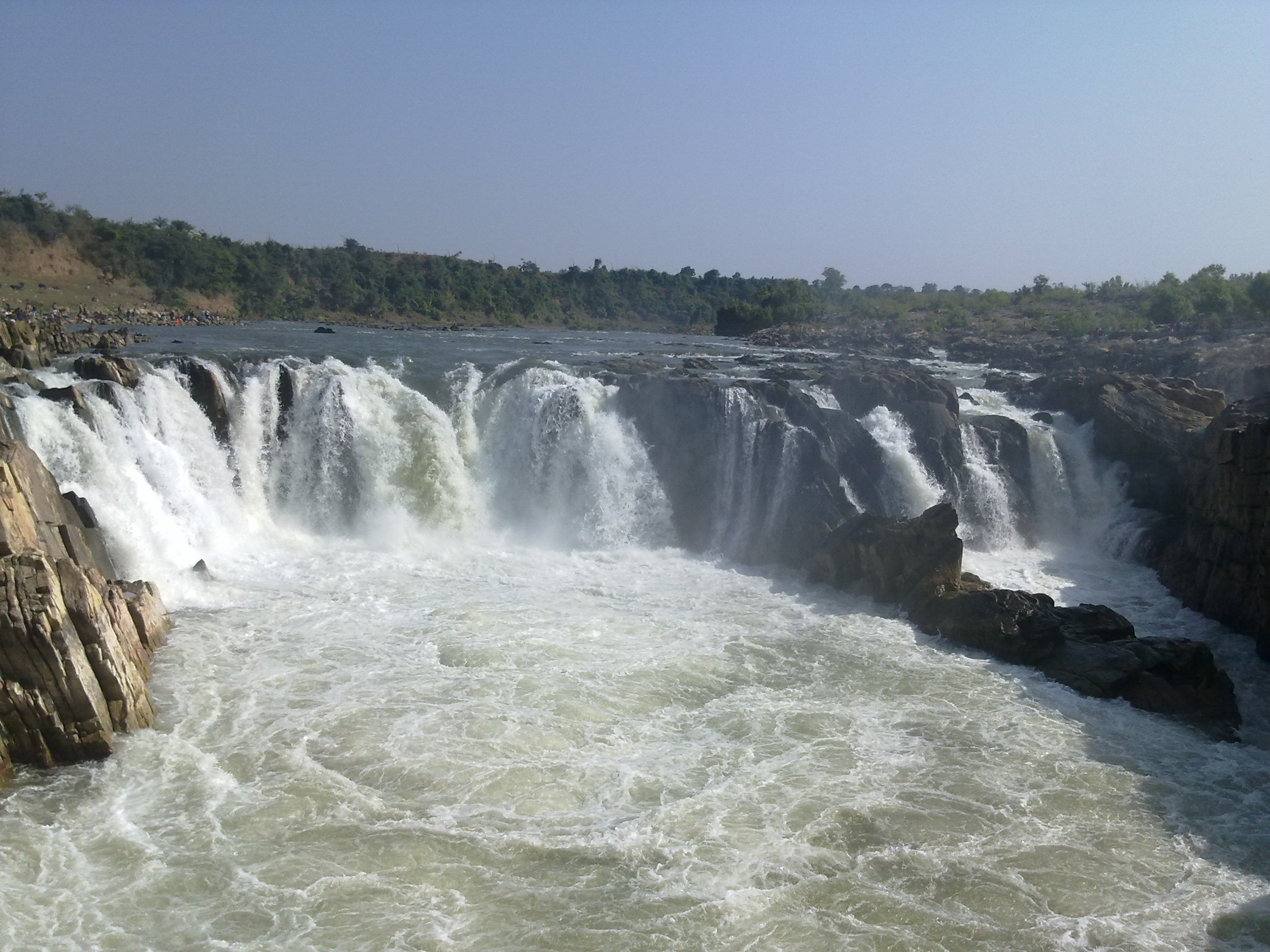
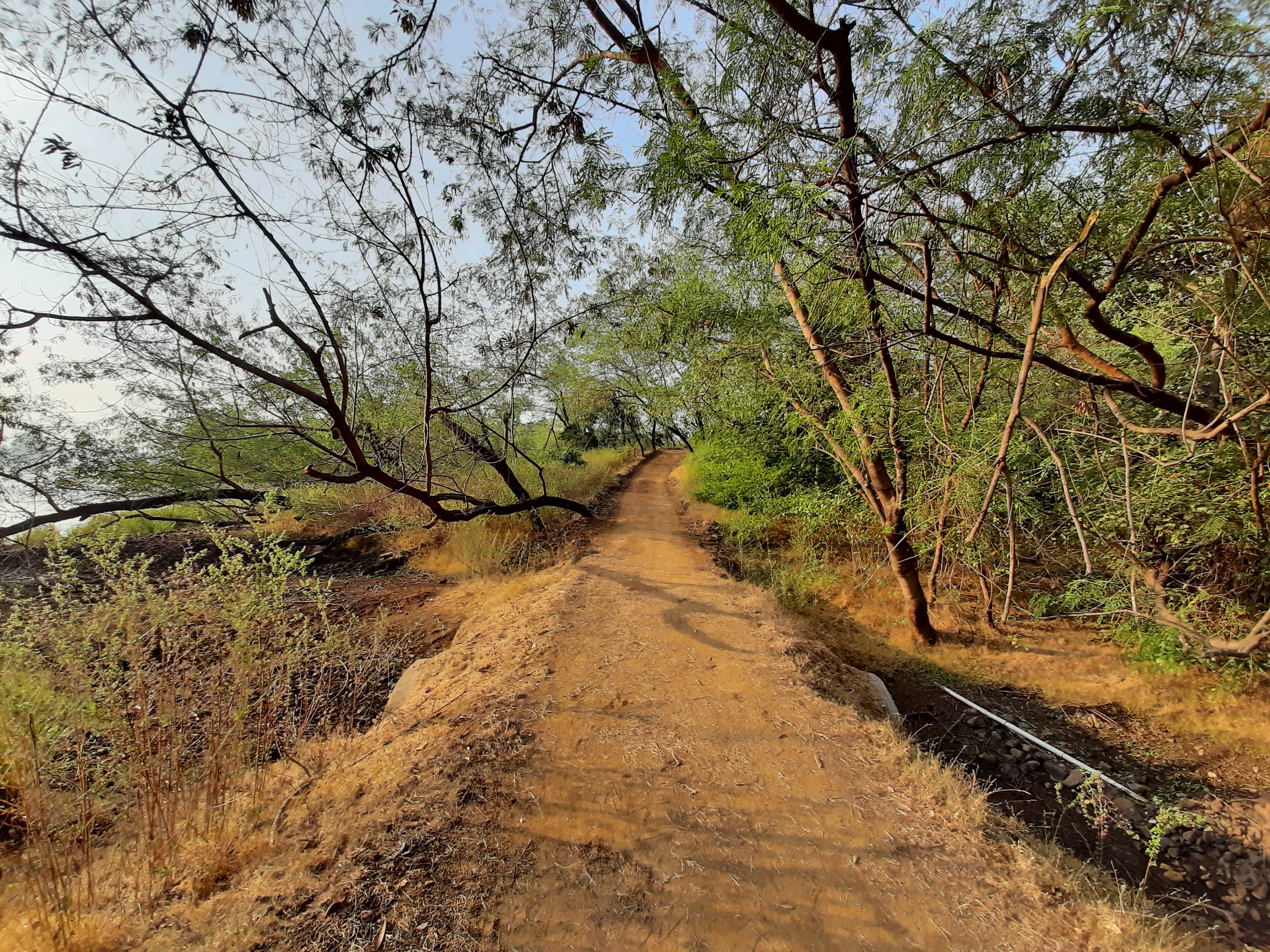
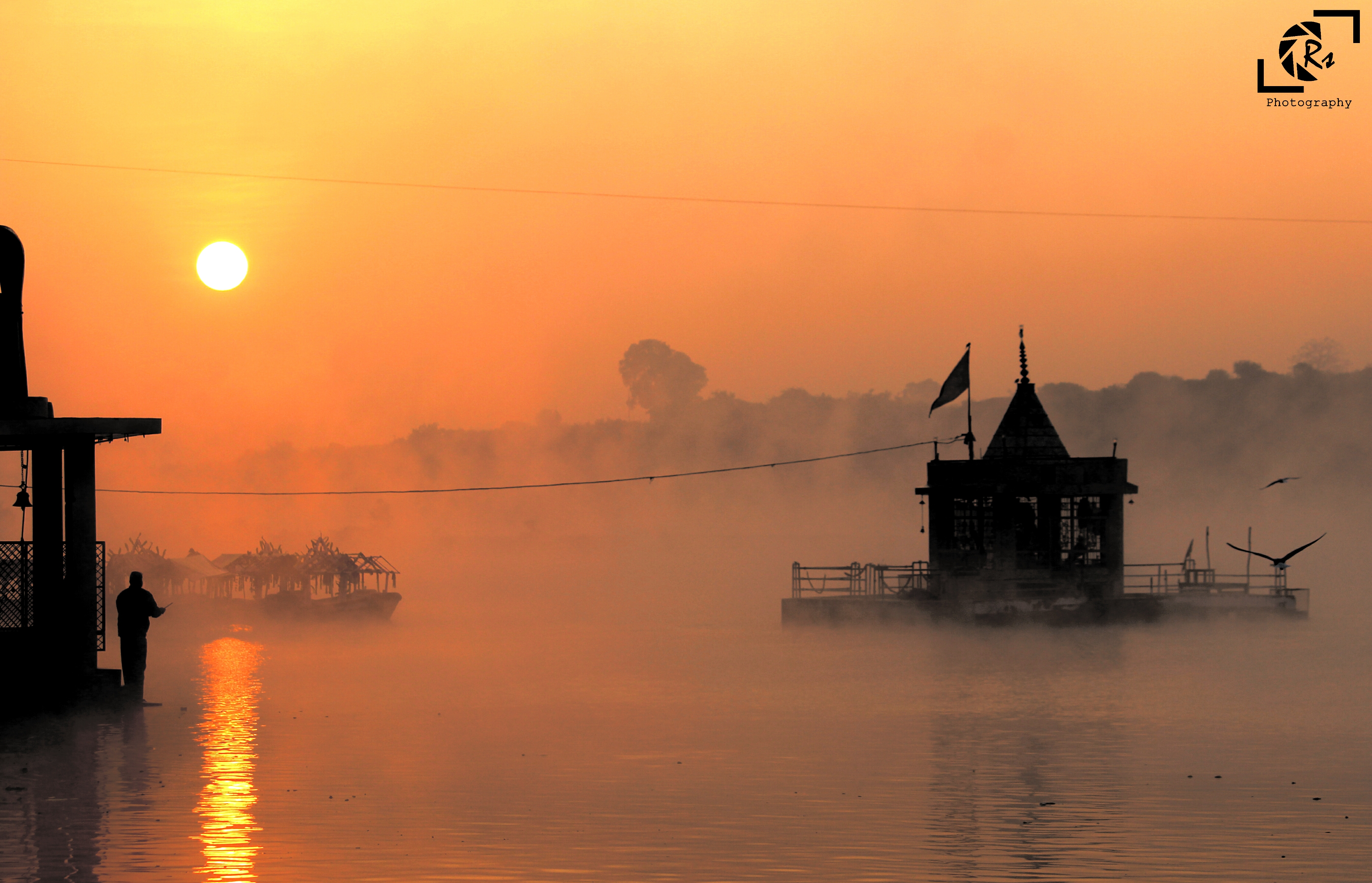
- Clockwise from top-left: Madan Mahal in Jabalpur, Chausath Yogini Temple, Bhedaghat, Dumna Nature Reserve Park, sunrise at Gwarighat, Dhuandhar Falls

- Location of Jabalpur district in Madhya Pradesh
- Country: India
- State: Madhya Pradesh
- Division: Jabalpur
- Headquarters: Jabalpur

Government
  - Lok Sabha constituencies: Jabalpur

Area
  - Total: 5,198 km^{2} (2,007 sq mi)

Population (2011)
  - Total: 2,463,289
  - Density: 473.9/km^{2} (1,227/sq mi)

Demographics
  - Literacy: 82.47%
  - Sex ratio: 925 females/1000 males
- Time zone: UTC+05:30 (IST)
- Website: jabalpur.nic.in

Jabalpur district (Hindi pronunciation: [d͡ʒəbəlpʊɾ]) is a district of Madhya Pradesh state in central India. The city of Jabalpur is the administrative headquarters of the district.

The area of the district is 5,198 km^{2} with population of 2,463,289 (2011 census). As of 2011 it is the second most populous district of Madhya Pradesh (out of 50), after Indore.

Jabalpur district is located in the Mahakoshal region of Madhya Pradesh, on the divide between the watersheds of the Narmada and the Son, but mostly within the valley of the Narmada, which here runs through the famous gorge known as the Marble rocks, and falls 30 ft. over a rocky ledge (the Dhuan Dhar, or misty shoot ). It consists of a long narrow plain running north-east and south-west and shut in on all sides by highlands. This plain, which forms an offshoot from the great valley of the Narmada, is covered in its western and southern portions by a rich alluvial deposit of black cotton soil. At Jabalpur city, the soil is black cotton soil, and water plentiful near the surface. The north and east belong to the basin of the Son River, a tributary of the Ganges and Yamuna, the south and west to the Narmada basin. The district is traversed by the main railway from Mumbai to Kolkata, and by branches of two other lines which meet at Katni junction.

== Geography ==
The district is part of Jabalpur Division. It has an average elevation of 411 metres (1348 ft).

== Sub Divisions ==
1. Jabalpur
2. Panagar
3. Shahpura
4. Patan
5. Kundam
6. Majholi
7. Sihora

== Climate ==
Climate data for Jabalpur Airport (1981–2010, extremes 1901–2011)
Month	Jan	Feb	Mar	Apr	May	Jun	Jul	Aug	Sep	Oct	Nov	Dec	Year
Record high °C (°F)	33.4 (92.1)	37.6 (99.7)	41.1 (106.0)	45.4 (113.7)	46.7 (116.1)	46.1 (115.0)	41.7 (107.1)	38.4 (101.1)	35.8 (96.4)	37.9 (100.2)	35.8 (96.4)	33.2 (91.8)	46.7 (116.1)
Mean daily maximum °C (°F)	24.6 (76.3)	27.8 (82.0)	33.4 (92.1)	38.5 (101.3)	41.1 (106.0)	37.7 (99.9)	31.3 (88.3)	29.8 (85.6)	31.1 (88.0)	31.7 (89.1)	28.9 (84.0)	25.7 (78.3)	31.8 (89.2)
Mean daily minimum °C (°F)	10.6 (51.1)	13.2 (55.8)	17.8 (64.0)	22.9 (73.2)	27.1 (80.8)	26.8 (80.2)	24.6 (76.3)	24.0 (75.2)	23.5 (74.3)	20.0 (68.0)	14.5 (58.1)	10.8 (51.4)	19.6 (67.3)
Record low °C (°F)	1.1 (34.0)	0.0 (32.0)	3.3 (37.9)	10.6 (51.1)	17.2 (63.0)	19.0 (66.2)	20.6 (69.1)	18.3 (64.9)	16.7 (62.1)	6.8 (44.2)	3.9 (39.0)	0.6 (33.1)	0.0 (32.0)
Average rainfall mm (inches)	21.9 (0.86)	24.6 (0.97)	14.9 (0.59)	4.8 (0.19)	11.4 (0.45)	168.0 (6.61)	376.6 (14.83)	401.9 (15.82)	220.9 (8.70)	30.2 (1.19)	10.1 (0.40)	6.0 (0.24)	1,291.4 (50.84)
Average rainy days	1.8	1.6	1.2	0.5	1.2	7.4	14.3	14.9	9.0	2.0	0.7	0.6	55.2
Average relative humidity (%) (at 17:30 IST)	49	37	25	19	21	47	73	79	70	53	51	51	48
Source: India Meteorological Department

== Demographics ==
Historical population
Year	Pop.	±% p.a.
1901	430,810	—
1911	472,102	+0.92%
1921	471,951	−0.00%
1931	489,583	+0.37%
1941	576,167	+1.64%
1951	662,569	+1.41%
1961	821,579	+2.17%
1971	1,119,885	+3.15%
1981	1,484,235	+2.86%
1991	1,768,037	+1.77%
2001	2,151,203	+1.98%
2011	2,463,289	+1.36%

According to the 2011 census Jabalpur district has a population of 2,463,289 roughly equal to the nation of Kuwait or the US state of Nevada. This gives it a ranking of 180th in India (out of a total of 640). The district has a population density of 472 inhabitants per square kilometre (1,220/sq mi). Its population growth rate over the decade 2001-2011 was 14.39%. Jabalpur has a sex ratio of 925 females for every 1000 males, and a literacy rate of 82.47%. 58.46% of the population lives in urban areas. Scheduled Castes and Tribes made up 14.13% and 15.23% of the population respectively.

Religions in Jabalpur district (2011)
Religion	Percent
Hinduism	87.65%
Islam	8.27%
Jainism	1.37%
Christianity	0.94%
Other religions (tribal)	0.85%
Sikhism	0.54%
Other or not stated	0.38%

Hindus are majority religion in Jabalpur district with 87.65%, Muslims with 8.27% and rest of Jains, Sikhs and Christians.

=== Languages ===
Languages of Jabalpur district (2011)
1. Hindi (94.2%)
2. Urdu (1.93%)
3. Others (3.86%)

At the time of the 2011 Census of India, 94.21% of the population in the district spoke Hindi and 1.93% Urdu as their first language.

The dialect of the region is Baghelkhandi. Other languages spoken in the district by a significant number of people in the district include Marathi, Punjabi, Sindhi and Bengali, almost exclusively in Jabalpur city.

== Education ==
Jabalpur is an important educational centre of the Madhya Pradesh state.

The district contains several universities, including Rani Durgavati University, Jawahar Lal Nehru Krishi University, Madhya Pradesh Pashu Chikitsa University, Netaji Subhash Chandra Bose Medical College, Dharmashastra National Law University, Gyan Ganga Institute of Technology and Sciences, and Maharshi Mahesh Yogi Vedic University.

Colleges and institutes in the district include Govt. Engineering College, Netaji Subhash Chandra Bose Medical College, and Govt. M.H. College of Home Science and Science, as well as law colleges, and undergraduate and postgraduate colleges. The Indian Institute of Information Technology, Design & Manufacturing (IIITDM) Jabalpur was established in January 2005, and would serve as an inter-disciplinary institution for education and research by keeping the concept of Product Lifecycle Management (PLM) in mind.

Notable schools include the Pandit Lajja Shankar Jha Model Higher Secondary School of Excellence, founded in 1905.

In addition, Jabalpur includes a number of institutes offering professional courses in computing, fashion design, fine arts, and other subject areas.

== Landmarks ==
- Dhuandhar Falls
- Madan Mahal fort
- Dumna Nature Reserve Park
- Bargi Dam

== See also ==
- Bargi
