= Dumna Nature Reserve Park =

Ecotourism site in Madhya Pradesh, India

Dumna Nature Reserve
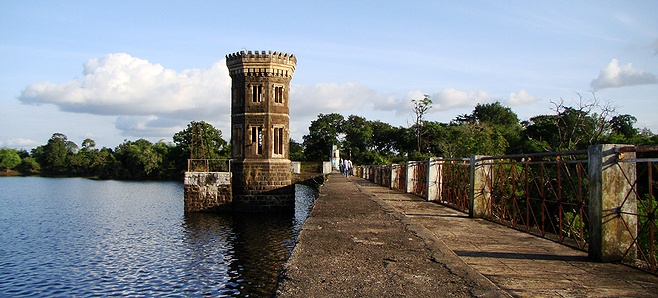

- Location within Madhya Pradesh Location within India
- Location: Madhya Pradesh, India
- Nearest city: Jabalpur
- Coordinates: 23°17′N 80°016′E
- Area: 1,800 acres (7.3 km^{2})
- Established: 1883
- Governing body: Jabalpur Municipal Corporation

The Dumna Nature Reserve (DNR) is an ecotourism site near Jabalpur, Madhya Pradesh, India. Operated by Jabalpur Municipal Corporation is, it is spread over nearly 1800 acres of forested land on a plateau, about 40 meters above Jabalpur town. It was transferred to the Municipal Committee of Jubbulpore by the provincial government to act as the catchment area for the Khandari lake. The construction of Khandari Dam materialized in February 1883 under J.H. Morris, Chief Commissioner of the Central Provinces and Berar. Since then, the forested area provides rainwater to feed the Khandari Reservoir. The place, along with Lower Gaur forest, is described in Captain James Forsyth’s ‘Highlands of Central India’ as a favored place for tiger shoots for British officers.

This forest is a dry deciduous type, typical of central Indian mixed forests. It is home to many species of native trees, plants, shrubs, herbs, creepers, climbers, and grasses. The park boasts of diverse ecosystems - woodlands, grasslands, and wetlands. Dumna has a resident population of 9 leopards, nearly 2,000 deer – Cheetal, Barking deer, Four-horned antelope, Jungle cat, Rusty-spotted cat, Wild boar, Crocodile, and more. More than 300 bird species, both migrant and resident, have been recorded from Dumna.

It is an ecotourism site open to the public located in the Jabalpur district of the Indian state of Madhya Pradesh. It includes a dam, forests, and wildlife in a 1058-hectare area. Wild animals, including chital, wild boar, porcupine, jackals, and many species of birds inhabit the park. Sightings of leopards have also been reported in and around the park. A children's park and a restaurant are available. A hanging bridge, tent platform, rest house, fishing platform, toy train, and boating are other attractions at the nearby Khandari Dam. Activities in the water, including bathing or swimming, are prohibited due to the presence of crocodiles.

== Biodiversity of Dumna ==
=== Mammals ===
Mammals are the most adaptive species on the planet. They are found on every continent and in every ocean, on land, water and air. There are 5.500 species of mammals found globally, which includes The Blue Whale (Largest), Carnivores like Tiger, leopard etc., Bats, Shrews and so on. Dumna is home to 57 of the 422 mammal species found in Indian Subcontinent, i.e. 13.5% of the total species. As per the evolutionary history, these mammals are classified under 7 ORDER (Taxonomic classification).

=== Birds ===
Birds have inhabited every geographical region on the planet. All birds have feathers, but not all birds can fly. Globally there are around 10,000 species of birds of which about 1300 species are found in India (42 being endemic to the Indian subcontinent).The diversity in the forest type of Dumna supports avian diversity throughout the year. There are 296 bird species recorded in Dumna Nature Reserve of which 34.5% (102) species are migrant during winters, summers or passage.

=== Reptiles ===
Apart from being an essential component of the web of life for prey as well as predators, Reptiles, also have anthropogenic influence in the ecosystem. There are 11,136 species in the world, 610 species in India of which 50% are endemic species. 7% of the species found in the country are recorded in Dumna Nature Reserve. Dumna still is unexplored in terms of reptile studies and extensive research may report many species which may be found in this habitat. Out of the 43 species, 29 species are protected under Schedule I, II & IV of Wildlife Protection Act 1972 and 4 Species are also covered under IUCN (The International Union for Conservation of Nature) Red List of threatened species.

=== Insects ===
Outnumbering all the other species in terms of diversity and population, Insects are the most diverse species on Earth. While most of the insects are considered a pest, many are welcomed for their colourful fluttering presence. 125 species of Moths, 61 species of odonata, 22 species of ants and 20 species of wasps have been recorded in Dumna.

==== Lepidoptera (Butterflies) ====
The rare Anomalous Nawab (Polyura agrarius) has been recorded in Dumna Nature Reserve was previously recorded in Madhya Pradesh in 1886 by Charles Swinhoe. Of the 1,300 species of butterflies in India, 127 species are protected under Wildlife Protection act - Schedule I, receiving the highest conservation priority equivalent to the Tiger. 11 of these species have been recorded in Dumna.

=== Flora ===
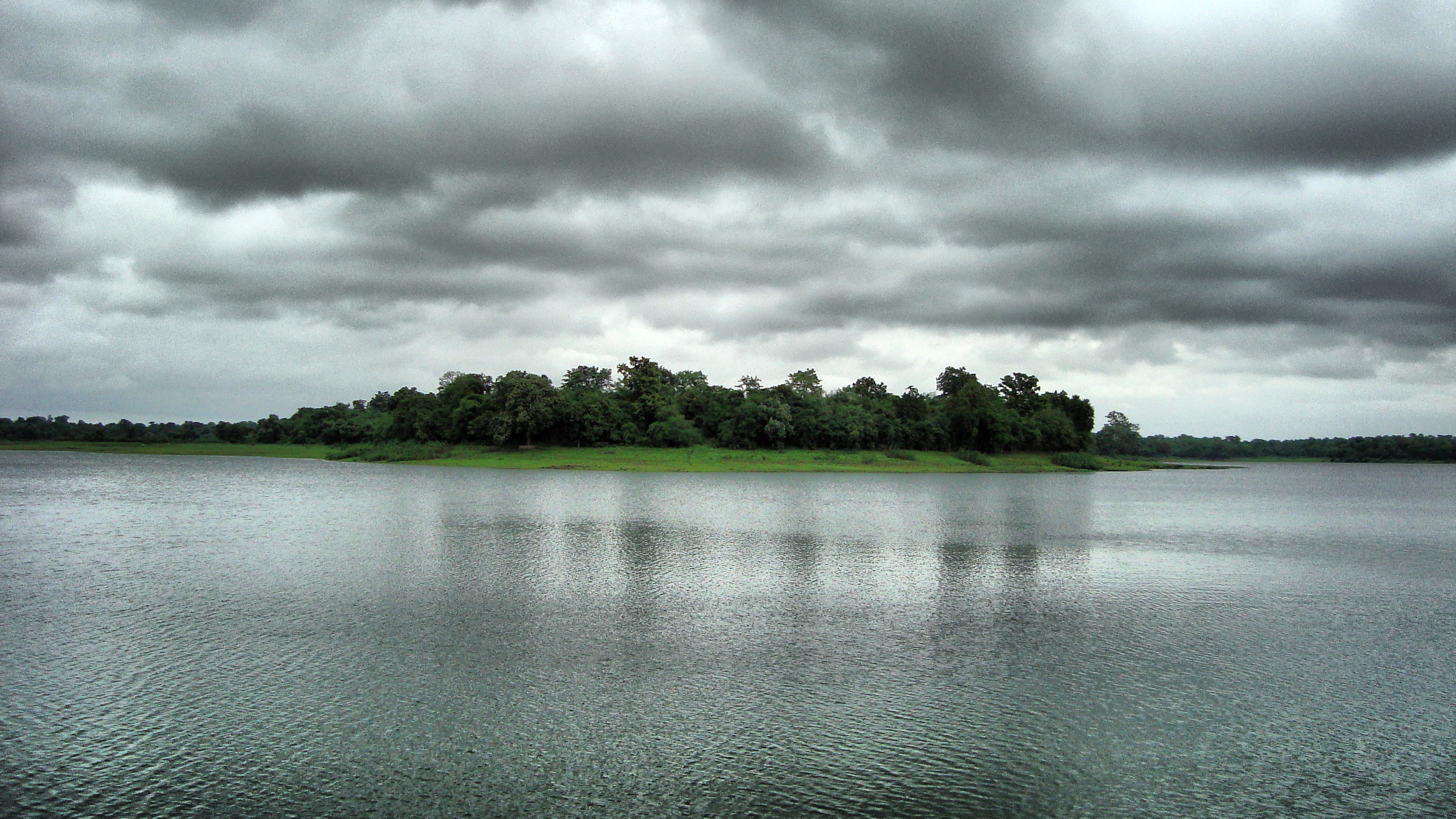
Khandari Reservoir

109 variety of trees have been recorded in Dumna, keeping the ecosystem alive.

== Khandari Dam ==
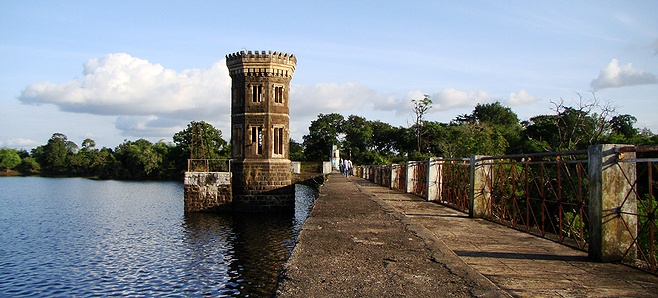
Khandari Dam

Khandari Dam is a spill-type dam constructed by J.H. Morris, Chief Commissioner of Central Provinces and Berar. Construction was completed on 26 February 1883, to supply water to 1/3rd of Jabalpur City. The dam's capacity is 6.30 Million cubic metres and its water supply capacity is 6.75 to 9 MLD.

== Transport ==
The distance from Jabalpur is approximately 10 km. The reserve is situated near the Jabalpur Airport.

- Jabalpur Airport provides daily service to Mumbai and New Delhi.
- Jabalpur Junction railway station is situated on the Allahabad- Mumbai railway link.
- Jabalpur is situated on NH-7 and NH-12A highways.
