= List of educational institutions in Jabalpur =

Jabalpur has been one of the most important centers for higher education in the Madhya Pradesh region. This was true particularly in earlier years. In the 1950s and 1960s, the colleges were widely known in Madhya Pradesh and outside

== Universities ==
- Jawaharlal Nehru Agricultural University, founded in 1964
- Madhya Pradesh Medical Science University, founded in 2011
- Nanaji Deshmukh Veterinary Science University, founded in 2009
- Rani Durgavati University, also known as the "University of Jabalpur" founded in 1956
- Dharmashastra National Law University, Jabalpur established in 2018
- Mangalayatan University Jabalpur established in 2006
- Mahakaushal University established in 2021

== Engineering Colleges ==
- Indian Institute of Information Technology, Design and Manufacturing, Jabalpur established in 2005
- Jabalpur Engineering College (JEC) founded in 1947

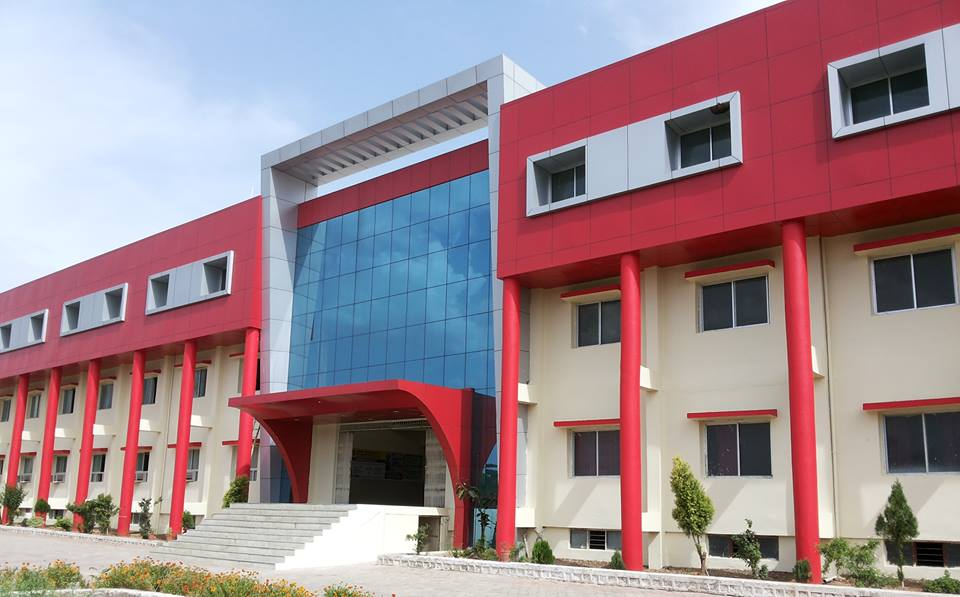
LNCT Jabalpur

- Global Nature Care Sangathan Group of Institution Jabalpur (GNCSGI)
- Guru Ramdas Khalsa Institute of Science and Technology (GRKIST)
- Gyan Ganga College Of Technology (GGCT)
- Gyan Ganga Institute of Technology and Sciences (GGITS)
- Hitkarini College of Engineering and Technology (HCET)
- Lakshmi Narain College of Technology, Jabalpur (LNCT)
- Shri Ram Institute of Technology
- Laxmi Bai Sahu College
- St. Alloysius Institute of Technology

== Management Colleges ==
- Lakshmi Narain College of Technology, Jabalpur (LNCT)
- Xavier Institute of Development Action and Studies

== Medical Colleges ==
- Netaji Subhash Chandra Bose Medical College
- Hitkarini Dental College & Hospital
- Sukh Sagar Medical College and Hospital

== Colleges ==
- Government Science College, Jabalpur (Erstwhile known as 'Robertson College' was established in 1836)
- St. Aloysius College, Jabalpur
- Govindram Seksaria College of Commerce
- Mata Gujri Mahila Mahavidyalaya
- Maharishi Mahesh Yogi Vedic Vishwavidyalaya

== Schools ==
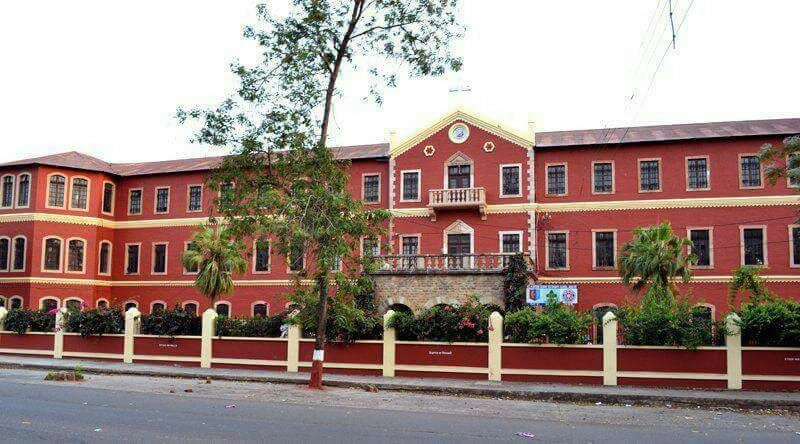
St. Aloysius Senior Secondary School

- Pandit Lajja Shankar Jha Model Higher secondary school of Excellence, Established in 1907
- St. Aloysius Senior Secondary School, Established in 1868
- St. Josephs' Convent Girls' Senior Secondary School
- Christ Church Boys' Senior Secondary School
- Christ Church Girls' Senior Secondary School
- Christ Church School for Boys & Girls ISC
- Vision International Public School, Patan Road
- St. Gabriel's Senior Secondary School, Ranjhi
- Little World School, Tilwara
- Jawahar Navodaya Vidyalaya, Bargi Nagar
- Joy Senior Secondary School, Jabalpur
- Delhi Public School, Nagpur Road
- Wisdom Valley School, Narmada Road
- Nachiketa Higher Secondary School, Napier Town
- M.G.M. Higher Secondary School, Hatital

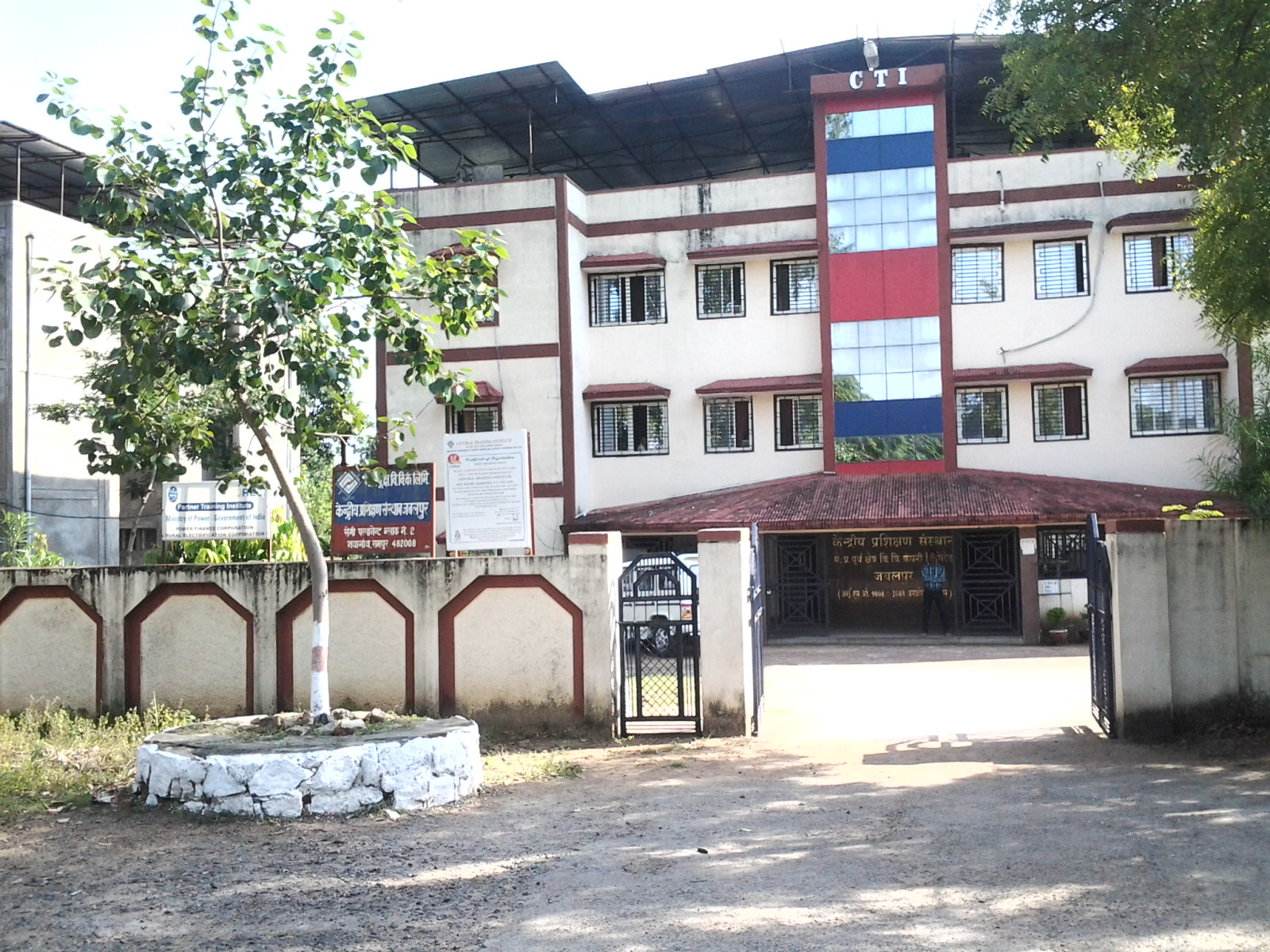
Central Training Institute Jabalpur

== Training Institutes ==
- ICMR-National Institute of Research in Tribal Health Jabalpur
- Tropical Forest Research Institute Jabalpur, established in 1988
- State Forest Research Institute, Jabalpur established in 1963
- Central Training Institute, Nayagaon
- Govt Model Industrial Training Institute, Damoh Road, Madhotaal
- IGTR-ITI Hi-Tech Training Centre, Jabalpur founded in 2013
