= Eraldo Maglara =

American certified personal trainer, author and fitness consultant

- Born: April 12, 1965 (age 61)
- Occupations: personal trainer, author, fitness consultant, TV host
- Website: eraldomaglara.com

Eraldo Maglara (born April 12, 1965) is an American certified personal trainer, author and fitness consultant. He is the co-executive producer and host of the TV show "Lifestyle Today with Justine & Eraldo" which airs on WLNY 1055 New York (a CBS owned station) Saturday's at 3:30pm.

== Education ==
Eraldo Maglara holds a bachelor's degree in Business, a Personal Fitness Degree from the National Personal Training Institute (NPTI), as well as certification from the National Strength and Conditioning Association (NSCA).

== Career ==
Eraldo Maglara is the co-executive producer and host of “Lifestyle Today with Justine & Eraldo”. Season one is airing on WLNY New York which has a reach of 2.8 million homes daily in the largest market in the country – New York, New Jersey, and Connecticut. This 30-minute broadcast is about healthy living and a positive mindset, along with exclusive expert and celebrity interviews.

In 2013, Maglara's debut book The Real Fountain of Youth: Simple Lifestyle Changes for Productive Longevity was published by Jersey Fit.

=== Media ===
Maglara has appeared on numerous other television shows, such as the national show The Daily Meal, MSN, Fox 43, WJLA Let’s Talk Live Washington DC, Virginia This Morning, WBFF Good Day Baltimore, CT Style. He has been quoted by many publications and websites, including Men’s Health, Latin Trends, NJ.com, LovetoKnow.com and Galtime.
