= Shiv Prasad Kosta =

Indian space scientist (born 1931)

Dr. Shiv Prasad Kosta
- Born: 25 April 1931 (age 95); Jabalpur, Madhya Pradesh, India
- Scientific career
- Workplaces: ISRO (director); Shri Ram Institute of Technology (director); Charotar University of Science and Technology (advisor)

Dr. Shiv Prasad Kosta (born 25 April 1931) is a space scientist, educationist and a technocrat and currently the Group Director of Shri Ram Institute of Technology in Jabalpur and Charotar University of Science and Technology, Changa, Gujarat. During his whole career as a scientist, he has made contributions in different organizations, including the national strategic Space Research Centre of India ISRO. Former President Dr. A. P. J. Abdul Kalam and former Chief Election Commissioner T. N. Seshan were his colleagues in ISRO from 1981 to 1995.

== Educational and family background ==
Kosta was born 25 April 1931 in Garha, a part of Sanskardhani in Jabalpur. He belonged to a poverty-stricken family of a farmer. While talking about his early education, Kosta Sir has completed his primary, middle, secondary and higher secondary education from Government Technical High School Kala Niketan. Kosta passed his high school technical examination from Government Technical High School Jabalpur in 1952 and joined Government Science College (formerly known as Robertson College), where he obtained M.Sc. in physics and electronics from Sagar University of M.P. in 1958.

== Professional career as engineer and scientist ==
Kosta started his professional career as a research assistant in 1958 by joining the Ministry of Education in New Delhi through the UPSC. In the year 1962, he travelled to Germany and received a scholarship from the Indo-German exchange to deliver his services and explore technological skills in Stuttgart and Munich. Here, he worked as a development engineer for a period of about one year, from 1961 to 1962. He proceeded with his work as an engineer in the Andrew Corporation of Chicago from 1962 to 1963. In 1964, Kosta joined the National Physics Laboratory of India in New Delhi as a junior scientist and worked for a period of 3 months. After this, in September 1964, he delivered his skills as Senior Scientist and Officer in CEERI (Central Electronics Engineering Research Institute) of Pilani in Rajasthan.

== Contribution in the ISRO centre of India ==
In 1971, Kosta joined as principal technical officer and deputy director of the first Indian Satellite Project Aryabhata (satellite) in [RO. Later on, he was promoted as Group Director of ISRO Satellite Centre in Bangalore and contributed his skills and ideas for Remote Sensing Satellites and application satellite projects, as Communication Satellite, Bhaskara (satellite) and Ariane Passenger Payload Experiment. Furthermore, starting from 1981 to 1987, Kosta delivered his services in headquarters of ISRO located in Bangalore. During the entire career of Kosta in ISRO, he got the opportunity to work as a team with large numbers of countrywide and international scientists, including the scientist-cum-former president Dr. A. P. J. Abdul Kalam.

== Other services ==
After successful accomplishment of various projects under ISRO, Kosta was the Director in the Department of Electronics, now Department of Electronics and Information Technology, Government of India from 1987 to 1990. In 1990, he took the position of Vice Chancellor of Jabalpur University of the M.P. Government. Kosta worked in the University until 1994 and then joined as Director General of M.M. Vedic University Jabalpur (M.P.). He made contributions to Vedic University up to the year 2000. Currently, Kosta works under two institutions i.e. Director in Shri Ram Institute of Technology in Jabalpur and Chief Technical Advisor in Sagar Group of Institutes in Bhopal and Charotar University of Science & Technology in Changa, Gujarat.

== Publications ==
Kosta has remained the author of about 10 different books published in Hindi on different ISRO Projects, books on various Indian satellites, like Ariane Passenger Payload Experiment, Bhaskara (satellite) and Aryabhata (satellite). In addition, he was the author of famous books on Communication Satellite and SLV3. Lastly, his publication will include the first Rocket launched by Dr. Kalam.

== Research work ==
During his research work, Kosta guided large numbers for M.Tech. and Ph.D. degrees. Three of his students have gained the opportunity to serve as Principal in the Electronics Department under Rani Durgavati University.

=== Tuneable dual-band antenna novel ===
Kosta, along with his partners, presented an engineered novel about a tunable, metamaterial and dual-band type of antenna working primarily on the array of split ring resonator or SRR. Negative SRR stack of antenna adds enhanced tuning ability to it, even with a marginal trade-off between cross polarization and antenna gain.

=== Patch antenna with negative refractive-index applications in wideband ===
Kosta contributed to the introduction of a patch antenna loaded with materials delivering a negative refractive index. He and his other partners opined that the antenna suits perfectly for countless ultra-wideband applications, while the operation achieved via a deflected ground plane combined with a CNC split resonator.

=== Overview and analysis on best utilization of split ring resonators ===
This research paper, created by Kosta and his colleagues Dwivedi and Upadhyaya, is primarily about the best utilization of split ring resonators within multiple materials with negative permeability. In addition, the citation focuses on various concepts and production procedures related to an isotropic medium of negative permeability, CPW support propagation of a particular left-handed wave and wire media that exhibits negative permittivity.

=== Human blood-based amplifier ===
Kosta's team have developed for the first time an amplifier circuit in discrete format based on human blood plasma that operates on IC or integrated Circuit configuration mode. Human blood contains large numbers of negative and positive charge carriers as atomic ions or molecules, to serve as electrically conducting mediums. Hence, experts can use them to develop various electronic circuit devices and specific application circuits. Indeed, the newly designed electronic circuits will have many applications related to biomedical engineering, health or medical science and various other related techniques.

=== Liquid (human blood) memristor analysis ===
Kosta and his colleagues have used therapeutic methodology to make a physical model network containing alignment of three different memristors in parallel and in series combination to study the function of its components. The citation highlights the characteristics of liquid (human blood) memristor or its proper combination to fulfil specific or potential applications in the sector of biomedical electronics, artificial brain, man and machine interface and envisaged signal processing and lots more.

=== Human blood-based electronic transistor ===
Kosta and his team have, for the first time, studied the 'human blood-based electronic transistor' (HBBET). Effects of variables like blood temperature, blood flow rate, and distance between the forming probes on the input/output characteristics, as well as current gain factor β of the transistor, are studied. Emerging applications of bio-material human tissue blood electronic circuits towards cyborg implants, human-machine interface, human disease detection/healing, human health sensors and digital signal processing are visualised.

== Awards and honours ==
Awards and Honours
Award name	Organization/Place	Years
Robes of Honour	Aeronautical Society of India	197
Distinguished Achievement for Aryabhata (satellite)	Project ISRO	1976
Medal	USSR Academy of ScienceRussian Academy of Science	1978
Science Talent	Gwalior Development Council	1979
Soviet Land Nehru Award	Moscow	1982
Education Excellence Award	AIBC Foundation, New Delhi	2006
Dr. Atma Ram Science Award	U.P. Gov't Lucknow	1992

== Sources ==
- Kosta, SP; Kosta, YP; Bhatele, M; Dubey, YM; Gaur, A; Kosta, S; Gupta, J; Patel, A; Patel, B (2011). "Human blood liquid memristor". International Journal of Medical Engineering and Informatics. 3 (1): 16–29. doi:10.1504/IJMEI.2011.039073.
- Kosta, SP; Bhatele, M; Chuadhari, JP; Upadhyay, T; Soni, D; Nema, SP; Kosta, YP; Patel, KN; Vaghela, PR; Patel, JR; Patel, BS; Thakre, L; Kosta, S; Choubey, SD; Nigam, T; Mehta, H (2012). "Human blood-based electronic transistor". International Journal of Medical Engineering and Informatics. 4 (4): 373–386. doi:10.1504/IJMEI.2012.050278.
- Kosta, SP; Manavadaria, M; Pandya, K; Kosta, YP; Kosta, S; Mehta, H; Patel, J (2013). "Human blood plasma-based electronic integrated circuit amplifier configuration". Journal of Biomedical Research. 27 (6): 520–522. doi:10.7555/JBR.27.20130058. PMC 3841478. PMID 24285951.
- Kosta, SP; Bhatele, M; Gupta, P; Nair, P; Kosta, S; Choubey, SD; Thakre, L; Vaghela, PR; Patel, KN; Dave, BK; Chavda, J; Bhatt, C; Nigam, T (2014). "Physical model of human blood electronic memristors network". International Journal of Biomechatronics and Biomedical Robotics. 3 (2): 74–79. doi:10.1504/IJBBR.2014.064919.
- Upadhyaya, TK; Dwivedi, VV; Kosta, SP; Kosta, YP (3–5 November 2012b). "Miniaturization of Tri Band Patch Antenna Using Metamaterials". 2012 Fourth International Conference on Computational Intelligence and Communication Networks. Computational Intelligence and Communication Networks (CICN), 2012 Fourth International Conference on. Mathura: IEEE. pp. 45–48. doi:10.1109/CICN.2012.147. ISBN 978-1-4673-2981-1.
- Upadhyaya, TK; Dwivedi, VV; Kosta, SP; Patel, Z (2012a). "The Future of Satellite Communication Antennas: Negative Refractive Index Metamaterials – A Review" (PDF). International Journal of Emerging Technology and Advanced Engineering. 2 (1): 180–183.
- Upadhyaya, TK; Kosta, SP; Jyoti, R; Palandöken, M (2014). "Negative refractive index material-inspired 90-deg electrically tilted ultra wideband resonator". Optical Engineering. 53 (10) 107104. International Society for Optics and Photonics. Bibcode:2014OptEn..53j7104U. doi:10.1117/1.OE.53.10.107104.
- Upadhyaya, TK; Kosta, SP; Jyoti, R; Palandöken, M (2016). "Novel stacked μ-negative material-loaded antenna for satellite applications". International Journal of Microwave and Wireless Technologies. 8 (2). CUP: 229–235. doi:10.1017/S175907871400138X. S2CID 110683315.
