= Atmaram Award =

Atmaram Award आत्माराम पुरस्कार
- Award for outstanding contribution in the field of scientific and technical literature and instrument development
- Awarded for: Award in India
- Sponsored by: Central Hindi Directorate, Government of India
- First award: 1989
- Website: Official website

The Atmaram Award is an honor in India, given in memory of the Indian scientist, Dr. Atma Ram. It is one of the major awards given by the Central Hindi Directorate (Kendriya Hindi Sansthan), Ministry of Human Resource Development. It is conferred annually for an outstanding contribution in the field of scientific and technical literature and instrument development. The Atmaram award is given by the Central Hindi Directorate, Ministry of Human Resource Development, Government of India. The award carries ₹1 lakh (US$1,100) in cash, a plaque, and a citation. It is given to two people each year.

== Recipients ==
Year	Recipients
1989	Ram Charan Mehrotra, Dr. Brijmohan, Dr. Om Vikas, Gunamar Mule, Dr. Jayant Narlikar
1990	Daulat Singh Kothari, Dr. Satyaprakash Saraswati
1991	P. N. Shrivastava
1992	Dr. Nandlal Singh, Shiv Prasad Kosta
1993	M. G. K. Menon, Dr. Shivgopal Mishra
1994	Ajit Ram Verma, Dr. Ramesh Datt Sharma
1995	Harish Agrawal, Premanand Chandola
1996	Shukdev Prasad, Turshan Pal Pathak
1997	Ramswaroop Chaturvedi, Dayanand Pant
1998	Surajbhan Singh, Vishwa Mohan Tiwari
1999	Braj Kishor Sharma, Dr. Yatish Agrawal
2000	Dr. Vishnudatt Sharam, Dr. Maharaj Narayan Mehrotra
2001	Dr. Gopal Kabra
2002	Shyam Sundar Sharma, Dr. Girish Chandra Saxena
2003	Dr. Ray Avdesh Kumar Shrivastava, Anupam Mishra
2004	Jagdish Saxena, Dr. Rakesh Kumar Avasthi & Dilip Bhatia (combined)
2005	Devendra Mavari, Mahendra Madhup
2006	Khadg Singh Valdiya, Rekha Agrawal & Pradeep Sharma (combined)
2007	Durgadatt Ojha & Dr. Subodh Mahanti (combined), Dr. Vinita Singhal & Dr. Manoj Patairia (combined)
2008	Yashpal, Md. Khalil
2009	Subhash Lakhera, Narender K. Sehgal
2010-11	Kali Shankar
