= Government Science College, Jabalpur =

College in Madhya Pradesh

Coordinates: 23.1633675°N 79.9685517°E

- Other names: Government Model Science College, Jabalpur
- Former names: Robertson College Jabalpur
- Type: Public
- Established: 1836; 190 years ago
- Affiliations: University of Jabalpur
- Principal: A. L. Mahobia
- Location: Jabalpur, Madhya Pradesh, India
- Website: http://sciencecollegejabalpur.org

Government Science College, Jabalpur is an educational institute situated in Jabalpur, Madhya Pradesh, India. It was established in 1836, making it one of the oldest colleges in India. It has been accredited with grade 'A' by NAAC. The University Grants Commission (UGC) granted it autonomous status in 1990 and heritage status in 2015.

== History ==
=== Timeline ===
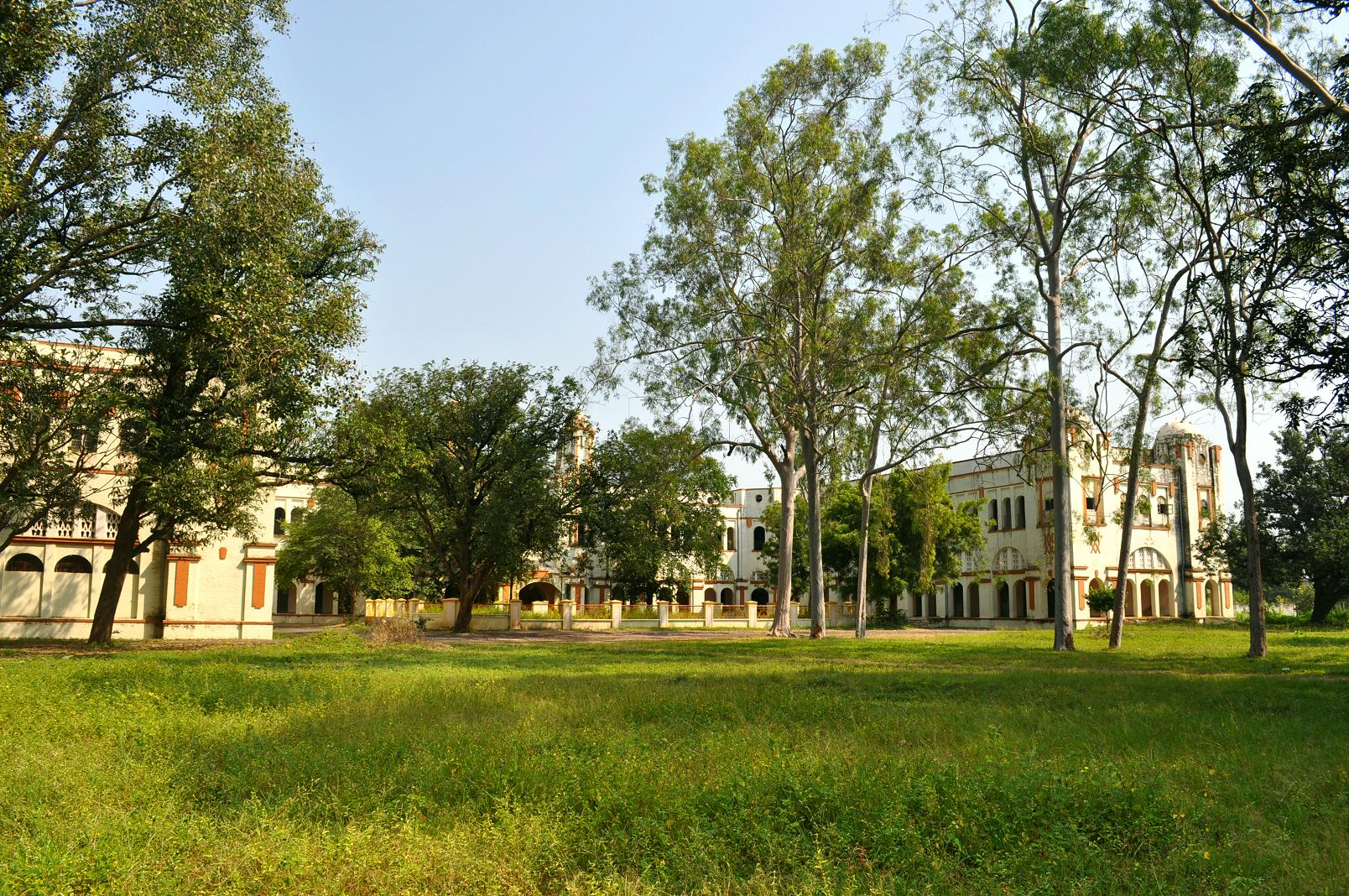
The former building of Robertson College which now houses the Civil engineering department of the Jabalpur Engineering College

- 1836 – Established in the Year 1836 at Saugor (Sagar, Madhya Pradesh)
- 1860 – Collegiate School at Saugor started
- 1873 – Transferred from Saugor to Jabalpur
- 1896 – Degree Courses in Science started
- 1916 – Named as Robertson College
- 1947 - Moved to the present campus as the previous campus was allotted to the Jabalpur Engineering College's Civil engineering department
- 1947 – After Independence the college was renamed as Mahakaushal Mahavidyalaya. Post Graduate Studies started.
- 1962 – Bifurcated into ‘Govt. Science College’ and Mahakaushal Arts & Commerce College.
- 1985 – Declared Model College by the Department of Higher Education, Government of Madhya Pradesh.
- 1990 – Granted autonomy by the UGC.
- 1999 – Courses in Microbiology and Biochemistry started at undergraduate level.
- 2001 - Courses started in Biotechnology at undergraduate level.
- 2002 - Courses started in Computer Science at undergraduate level.
- 2002 – Declared "Centre of Excellence in Science Education" by Government of Madhya Pradesh.
- 2002 – Accredited “A” Grade by NAAC.
- 2004 – College with Potential for Excellence by the UGC.
- 2011 – Selected for FIST grant by the Department of Science & Technology.
- 2015 – Received Heritage Status from the UGC.
- 2018 – Declared institute of excellence in higher education (iehe): Government of Madhya Pradesh (02-07-2018).
- 2019 – 3rd cycle NAAC accredited "A" grade.

=== Affiliations ===
- 1860–1890: Calcutta University
- 1891–1922: Allahabad University
- 1923–1946: Nagpur University
- 1947–1956: Sagar University
- 1957–present: Jabalpur University

== Academics ==
Government Science College, Jabalpur (MP) India has undergraduate, postgraduate and doctoral programmes; offering Bachelor of Science, Bachelor of Computer Applications,Master of Science and Doctor of Philosophy degrees in natural sciences, formal sciences, exact sciences and applied sciences.

== Teaching Departments ==
- Botany and Microbiology
- Chemistry and Biochemistry
- English Language
- Environmental Science
- Geology
- Hindi Language
- Mathematics and Computer Science
- Military Science
- Physics, Electronics, Computer Application and Computer Maintenance
- Zoology and Biotechnology

== Alumni ==
The notable alumni of the college include:

- Kunji Lal Dubey
- Veni Shankar Jha
- Ashok Kumar
- Bhawani Prasad Mishra
- Kusum Nair
- Ramkumar Verma
- Prem Nath
- Yogesh Mohan Tiwari
- Ravishankar Shukla
- Jagmohan Das
- Dwarka Prasad Mishra
- Chandulal Chandrakar
- Shiv Prasad Kosta
- Sharad Yadav
- Prahlad Singh Patel
- Rakesh Singh
- Om Prakash Dhurve
