= Sharad Yadav =

Indian politician (1947–2023)

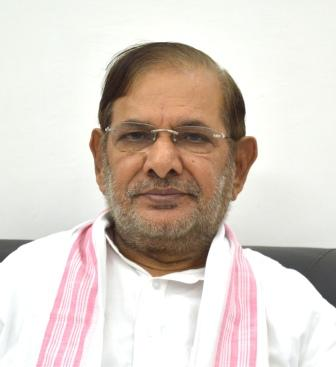
- Yadav in 2013

Union Minister of Consumer Affairs, Food and Public Distribution
- In office 1 July 2002 – 22 May 2004
- Prime Minister: Atal Bihari Vajpayee
- Preceded by: Shanta Kumar
- Succeeded by: Sharad Pawar

Union Minister of Labour
- In office 1 September 2001 – 1 July 2002
- Prime Minister: Atal Bihari Vajpayee
- Preceded by: Satyanarayan Jatiya
- Succeeded by: Sahib Singh Verma

Union Minister of Civil Aviation
- In office 13 October 1999 – 1 September 2001
- Prime Minister: Atal Bihari Vajpayee
- Preceded by: Ananth Kumar
- Succeeded by: Shahnawaz Hussain

Union Minister of Textiles; Union Minister of Food Processing Industries
- In office 6 December 1989 – 10 November 1990
- Prime Minister: Vishwanath Pratap Singh
- Preceded by: Ram Niwas Mirdha (Textiles)
- Succeeded by: Hukmdev Narayan Yadav

Member of Parliament, Rajya Sabha
- In office 8 July 2016 – 4 December 2017
- Succeeded by: Faiyaz Ahmad
- Constituency: Bihar
- In office 13 June 2014 – 7 July 2016
- Constituency: Bihar
- In office 8 July 2004 – 16 May 2009
- Succeeded by: George Fernandes
- Constituency: Bihar
- In office 5 July 1986 – 28 November 1989
- Constituency: Uttar Pradesh

Member of Parliament, Lok Sabha
- In office 16 May 2009 – 16 May 2014
- Preceded by: Pappu Yadav
- Succeeded by: Pappu Yadav
- Constituency: Madhepura, Bihar
- In office 7 October 1999 – 14 May 2004
- Preceded by: Lalu Prasad Yadav
- Succeeded by: Lalu Prasad Yadav
- Constituency: Madhepura, Bihar
- In office 20 June 1991 – 10 March 1998
- Preceded by: Ramendra Kumar Yadav
- Succeeded by: Lalu Prasad Yadav
- Constituency: Madhepura, Bihar
- In office 30 November 1989 – 20 June 1991
- Preceded by: Saleem Iqbal Shervani
- Succeeded by: Swami Chinmayanand
- Constituency: Badaun, Uttar Pradesh
- In office 1974–1980
- Preceded by: Seth Govind Das
- Succeeded by: Munder Sharma
- Constituency: Jabalpur, Madhya Pradesh

President of Janata Dal
- In office 1997–1999
- Preceded by: Lalu Prasad Yadav
- Succeeded by: Position abolished

Personal details
- Born: 1 July 1947 Babai, Central Provinces and Berar, British India
- Died: 12 January 2023 (aged 75) Gurugram, Haryana, India
- Party: Rashtriya Janata Dal (2022-2023)
- Other political affiliations: Loktantrik Janata Dal (2018-2022); Janata Dal (United) (1999-2017); Janata Dal (1988-1999); Bharatiya Lok Dal (before 1977); Janata Party (1977-1979); Lokdal (1979-1988)
- Spouse: Rekha Yadav (m. 1989)
- Children: 2
- Education: Jabalpur Engineering College (B.E); Robertson College Jabalpur (BSc)
- Occupation: Politician

Sharad Yadav (1 July 1947 – 12 January 2023) was an Indian politician from the Rashtriya Janata Dal (RJD) party. He was elected to the Lok Sabha seven times and to the Rajya Sabha four times for Janata Dal (United). He was the first national president of JD(U), serving from its formation in 2003 until 2016. He was disqualified from the Rajya Sabha in 2017 and removed from party leadership positions for engaging in anti-party activities.

== Early life and education ==
Yadav was born on 1 July 1947 to Nand Kishore Yadav and Sumitra Yadav in Babai village in Hoshangabad district of Madhya Pradesh. He obtained his Bachelor of Science degree from Robertson College Jabalpur which branched into Government Science College, Jabalpur. He also earned a Bachelor of Engineering degree in Electrical Engineering from Jabalpur Engineering College, where he was a gold medalist.

== Political career ==
Yadav's involvement with politics started in 1970 when he became the president of Jabalpur University Student Association. He was active in the Bihar Student Movement and was greatly influenced by the socialist ideas of Jayaprakash Narayan and Ram Manohar Lohia. He was jailed by the Jabalpur police in 1972 and 1975 due to his involvement with the student movement.

=== Member of Parliament ===
Yadav was elected to the Parliament of India, the Lok Sabha, seven times across constituencies in three different states – four times from Madhepura in Bihar, twice from Jabalpur in Madhya Pradesh and once from Badaun in Uttar Pradesh, which is a rare feat.

Yadav was elected to the Lok Sabha for the first time at the age of 27 from Jabalpur in 1974 in a by-poll after the death of incumbent Seth Govind Das. At a time when the JP Movement was at its peak, he won the by-poll for Bharatiya Lok Dal while still in jail. In the 1977 general election, he was re-elected from the same constituency under the newly formed Janata Party. He became the President of Yuva Lok Dal in 1978. When the Janata Party split in 1979, he sided with Charan Singh's faction.

When Rajiv Gandhi first entered the Lok Sabha by winning a by-poll from Amethi in 1981, Sharad Yadav was the losing candidate for Lok Dal. He contested the 1984 general election as a Lok Dal candidate from Badaun, which he lost against Saleem Iqbal Shervani of Congress. He was elected as a Member of Parliament from Rajya Sabha for the first time in 1986.

Yadav won the Badaun seat in the 1989 general election under the Janata Dal party, with INC's Ram Naresh Yadav being the runner-up. In an election dominated by the Bofors scandal, INC failed to form the government despite being the single largest party. Yadav emerged as one of the major players of the left-wing opposition coalition supporting V. P. Singh as the prime ministerial candidate, with external support from BJP. He obtained his first Central government cabinet position as Minister of Textiles in the V. P. Singh ministry He was one of the most powerful members of the cabinet and exerted pressure on V. P. Singh to implement the Mandal Commission report on reservations for OBCs in 1990, which led to widespread protests and brought Caste politics to the forefront.

He won Madhepura seat for Janata Dal in the 1991 general election, with the Jharkhand Party's Anand Mohan finishing in second place. He retained the seat in 1996 general election defeating the Samata Party's Anand Mandal. In the 1998 general election following the downfall of the I. K. Gujral government, he lost the Madhepura seat to Lalu Prasad Yadav, who had split from Janata Dal to form Rashtriya Janata Dal.

He contested the 1999 general election from Madhepura against Lalu Prasad again and won this time. Lalu's popularity had declined due to his implication with the Fodder Scam and the contest was eagerly watched for what its outcome would say of the electoral preferences of Yadav community. The election was won by the BJP led National Democratic Alliance. The Janata Dal faction led by J H Patel lent support for BJP, a move which was opposed by H. D. Deve Gowda, who wanted Janata Dal to be equidistant from both BJP and Congress. Deve Gowda split from Janata Dal to form Janata Dal (Secular); the remainder of the party led by Sharad Yadav would come to be called as Janata Dal (United). Yadav's faction merged with Lok Shakti and Samata Party to officially become Janata Dal (United) in 2003. Yadav became the first president of JDU and remained in the position till 2016.

In the Vajpayee led government, Yadav got a cabinet seat as Minister of Civil Aviation, a position which be held from 13 October 1999 – 1 September 2001. His performance as Aviation minister was criticised for failure to improve the aviation sector of India and was once quoted saying "In this country where crores of people have no other mode of transport but walking, concern for aviation is very elitist." His portfolio was changed from Aviation to the Ministry of Labour and Employment in the September 2001 cabinet reshuffle. In the July 2002 cabinet reshuffle, he was shifted to the Ministry of Consumer Affairs, Food and Public Distribution.

In the 2004 general election, he contested the Madhepura seat in Bihar against Lalu Prasad. Lalu contested this election from two seats, Madhepura and Chhapra, and won both. Lalu Prasad later gave up the Madhepura seat and the ensuing bypoll to fill the vacancy was won by RJD's Pappu Yadav. In the 2009 general election, Sharad Yadav won the Madhepura seat by a comfortable margin of 175,000 votes against RJD's Ravindra Charan Yadav. He failed to retain the seat in the 2014 general election and lost to RJD's Pappu Yadav. Having been removed from JDU in 2017 due to anti-party activities, he contested in the 2019 general election from Madhepura with RJD ticket. He lost to JDU's Dinesh Yadav.

Sharad Yadav won the Madhepura Lok Sabha seat a total of four times; in 1991, 1996, 1999 and 2009. However he was also defeated just as many times from there - twice by Lalu Prasad Yadav in 1998 and 2004, by Pappu Yadav in 2014, and by Dinesh Yadav in 2019.

In 2017, he gave a speech comparing votes to daughter's honour and suggesting to prefer the former. He was one of the accused in the hawala scandal; however, the charges were dismissed by the Supreme Court of India.

=== Loktantrik Janata Dal ===
Yadav founded the Loktantrik Janata Dal (LJD) in May 2018, after disassociating himself from the Nitish Kumar-led Janata Dal (United) in the wake of its alliance with the Bharatiya Janata Party in Bihar.

A merger with Bahujan Mukti Party (founded on 6 December 2012) was proposed but was called off.

== Personal life ==
He married Rekha on 15 February 1989, with whom he has a son and a daughter. His daughter Subhashini Raja Rao joined Indian National Congress just before 2020 Bihar Legislative Assembly election and announced her plans to contest from Bihariganj seat. She contested the seat as a candidate of RJD and lost. Sharad Yadav's son Shantanu Bundela is a post graduate from University of London.

Yadav died on 12 January 2023 in Gurgaon, aged 75. Prime Minister Narendra Modi condoled the death of Yadav and said that he did works for the welfare of common people. Bihar Chief minister Nitish Kumar expressed condolences over the death and announced one day of state mourning. He was cremated with full state honours on 14 January in his ancestral village of Ankhmau in Madhya Pradesh's Hoshangabad district.

== Positions held ==
Duration	Position held	Refs.
1974	Elected to 5th Lok Sabha in bye-election from Jabalpur constituency.	
1977	Re-elected to 6th Lok Sabha (2nd term) from Jabalpur constituency and President, Yuva Janata Dal	
1978	President, Lok Dal President, Yuva Lok Dal	
5 July 1986 – 28 November 1989	Elected to Rajya Sabha	
6 December 1989 – 10 November 1990	Elected to 9th Lok Sabha (3rd term) from Badaun constituency.	
1989–1997	General-Secretary, Janata Dal; chairman, Janata Dal Parliamentary Board	
December 1989 – November 1990	Union Cabinet Minister, Textiles and Food Processing Industries in V. P. Singh ministry	
1991–1996	Re-elected to 10th Lok Sabha (4th term) from Madhepura constituency and Member, Public Accounts Committee	
1996–1997	Re-elected to 11th Lok Sabha (5th term) from Madhepura constituency and chairman, Finance Committee	
1997–1999	President, Janata Dal	
1999–2004	Re-elected to 13th Lok Sabha (6th term) from Madhepura constituency	
13 October 1999 – 31 August 2001	Union Cabinet Minister, Civil Aviation	
1 September 2001 – 30 June 2002	Union Cabinet Minister, Labour	
1 July 2002 – 15 May 2004	Union Cabinet Minister, Minister of Consumer Affairs, Food and Public Distribution	
8 July 2004 – 16 May 2009	Re-elected to Rajya Sabha (2nd term)	
June 2006 – May 2009	Member, Committee on Ethics	
2009–2014	Re-elected to 15th Lok Sabha (7th term) from Madhepura constituency	
31 August 2009 – 2010	Chairman, Committee on Urban Development	
March 2011 – October 2013	Member, JPC to examine matter relating to Allocation and pricing of Telecom Licences and Spectrum	
13 June 2014 – 7 July 2016	Re-elected to Rajya Sabha (3rd term)	
October 2014 – July 2016	Member, JPC on Maintenance of Heritage Character and Development of Parliament House Complex	
December 2014 – July 2016	Chairman, Committee on Provision of Computer to Members of Rajya Sabha	
April 2015 – July 2016	Member, JPC on Security in Parliament House Complex	
May 2015 – July 2016	Member, Joint Committee on the Right to Fair Compensation and Transparency in Land Acquisition, Rehabilitation and Resettlement (Second Amendment) Bill, 2015	
8 July 2016 – 4 December 2017	Re-elected to Rajya Sabha (fourth term)	
July 2016 – September 2017	Chairman, Committee on Industry	
November – December 2017	Member, Joint Committee on Offices of Profit Member, Consultative Committee for the Ministry of Petroleum and Natural Gas	
April – July 2017	Member, Select Committee of Rajya Sabha on the Constitution (One Hundred and Twenty-third Amendment) Bill, 2017	

Lok Sabha
Preceded by Seth Govind Das	Member of Parliament for Jabalpur; 1974–1980	Succeeded by Munder Sharma
Preceded by Saleem Iqbal Shervani	Member of Parliament for Badaun; 1989–1991	Succeeded by Chinmayanand
Preceded by Ramendra Kumar Yadav	Member of Parliament for Madhepura; 1991–1998	Succeeded by Lalu Prasad Yadav
Preceded by Lalu Prasad Yadav	Member of Parliament for Madhepura; 1999–2004	Succeeded by Lalu Prasad Yadav
Preceded by Pappu Yadav	Member of Parliament for Madhepura; 2009–2014	Succeeded by Pappu Yadav
Preceded by Pappu Yadav	Member of Parliament for Madhepura; 2009–2014	Succeeded by Pappu Yadav
Political offices
Preceded by Ananth Kumar	Minister of Civil Aviation; 13 October 1999 – 31 August 2001	Succeeded by Syed Shahnawaz Hussain
Preceded by Satyanarayan Jatiya	Minister of Labour and Employment; 1 September 2001 – 1 July 2002	Succeeded by Sahib Singh Verma
Preceded by Shanta Kumar	Minister of Consumer Affairs, Food and Public Distribution; 1 July 2002 – 22 May 2004	Succeeded by Sharad Pawar
