= CTI =

CTI may stand for:

== Companies and organizations ==
- CTI Consultants, engineering consulting firm in Richmond, Virginia
- CTI Electronics Corporation, a manufacturer of industrial computer peripherals
- CTI Móvil, a Latin American mobile network operator
- CTI Records, a jazz record label
- CTI Renato Archer, a Brazilian research center
- Chung T'ien Television, CTi TV, a cable television network in Taiwan
- City Telecom (Hong Kong), telecommunications provider
- Garda Counter-Terrorism International, a section of the Irish national police
- Cuerpo Técnico de Investigación, a Colombian government agency focusing in criminal investigations
- Connectivity Technologies, Inc., an American wire and cable company
- Center for Technology Innovation, a research program of the Brookings Institution

== Schools ==
- CTI Education Group higher education institution, South Africa
- Central Training Institute Jabalpur, India
- Curtiss-Wright Technical Institute, trade school for aircraft maintenance training
- DePaul University School of Computer Science, Telecommunications and Information Systems

== Other ==
- Cyber threat intelligence, Cyber threat intelligence
- Canberra Tennis International, Australian tennis tournament
- Comparative Tracking Index, for measuring the electrical breakdown (tracking) properties of insulating material
- Computer telephony integration, technology allowing computers and telephones to be integrated or coordinated
- Cuito Cuanavale Airport, an Angolan airport, IATA code
- Cryptologic technician interpretive, a US Navy cryptologic technician rating
- Ivory Coast, ITU code
- Conquer the Island, a computer game mode where areas on a gamemap must be conquered
- Category/Type/Item, a nomenclature structure that is common for design tokens in design systems, most prominently promoted by Style Dictionary ^{1}
