= Ajit Ram Verma =

Indian physicist

- Born: 20 September 1921; Dalmau, India
- Died: 4 March 2009 (aged 87)
- Education: Allahabad University (BSc, MSc); University of London (PhD)
- Known for: Crystallography
- Awards: Padma Bhushan; Bhatnagar Award
- Scientific career
- Fields: Physics
- Workplaces: Delhi University; BHU; National Physical Laboratory of India
- Doctoral advisor: Samuel Tolansky
- Other academic advisors: Kathleen Lonsdale
- Doctoral students: Onkar Nath Srivastava

Ajit Ram Verma (1921–2009) was an Indian physicist. For his work in crystallography, he was awarded the Shanti Swarup Bhatnagar Prize in 1964. He was director of the National Physical Laboratory (NPL) for almost seventeen years (1965–1982). In 1982, the Padma Bhushan, India's third highest civilian award, was conferred on him by the President of India.

== Early life ==
Ajit Ram Verma was born on 20 September 1921 at Dalmau near Lucknow to Hans Raj Verma, a railway official, and Devi Rani. After early education at several places including Allahabad and Meerut, he enrolled in Allahabad University, where he took his BSc (1940) and MSc (1942) degrees.

== Career ==
Verma taught briefly at Delhi University before moving to the University of London, where he earned his PhD working on unimolecular growth spirals on the surfaces of crystals. On his return to India, he served as reader in physics at Delhi University for four years (1955-1959). In 1959 he moved to BHU, Varanasi, as professor and head of department. In 1965, he was appointed as director, NPL where he remained until 1982, making him the longest-serving director of NPL. Subsequently, for three years, he served as visiting professor at IIT Delhi. Later, he was emeritus scientist of CSIR and INSA senior scientist at NPL.

== Scientific contributions ==
Verma's early work on spiral growth of crystals has been featured on the Naturephysics portal under the "looking back" section.

== Society for Scientific Values ==
Verma was one of the founding members of the Society for Scientific Values (SSV), a voluntary body set up to emphasise "the need to promote integrity, objectivity and ethical values in the pursuit of science". The first meeting of SSV was held in June 1984, and it was formally registered as a Society under the Societies Registration Act (1860) on 18 August 1986. P. N. Tiwari, the founder Secretary of SSV, writes, "Dr. Verma, not only expressed his clear and certain views about the ethical and spiritual values that one has to have for doing genuine and good science but he also expressed his equally certain, frank and strong views about the kind of action that should be taken against a scientist who is found guilty of misconduct in research and publication."

== Awards and honours ==
- Padma Bhushan, Government of India, 1982
- Shanti Swarup Bhatnagar Prize, 1964
- Atmaram Award, 1994
- Fellow, Indian Academy of Sciences, Bangalore
- Fellow, Indian National Science Academy, New Delhi
- Fellow, National Academy of Sciences of India, Allahabad
- Member, Board of Editors – Solid State Communications, Pergamon Press
- Elected member of International Committee for Weights and Measures (CIPM), Paris 1966-1982

== Books authored by Ajit Ram Verma ==
- Crystal growth and dislocations by Ajit Ram Verma, Butterworth's Scientific Publications, 1953, 182 pp.
- Polymorphism and polytypism in crystals by Ajit Ram Verma and Padmanabhan Krishna, John Wiley and Sons, New York, 1966, 341 pp. ISBN 0-471-90643-3
- Crystallography for solid state physics by Ajit Ram Verma and Onkar Nath Srivastava, Wiley Eastern Ltd., New Delhi, 1982, 348 pp. ISBN 978-0-85226-890-2
- Crystallography applied to Solid State Physics, by Ajit Ram Verma and Onkar Nath Srivastava, New Age International, New Delhi, 1991, 464 pp.
- Concept of truth in science and religion by K. D. Gangrade, L. S. Kothari and A. R. Verma, Concept Publishing Company, New Delhi, 2005. ISBN 978-81-8069-190-4
