= Shri Ram Institute of Technology =

Engineering college in Jabalpur, Madhya Pradesh, India

Shri Ram Institute of Technology (SRIT)
- Type: Private & Self-financing
- Established: 2001
- Director: S P Kosta
- Students: 8,000
- Undergraduates: 7,000
- Postgraduates: 1,000
- Location: Jabalpur, Madhya Pradesh India; 23.2012599°N 79.9124926°E
- Campus: Urban
- Website: www.sritgroup.net

Shri Ram Institute of Technology (SRIT) is an engineering college located in Jabalpur in the state of Madhya Pradesh, India. The college was established in 2001. The institute is a part of Shri Ram Group Jabalpur.

== History ==
Shri Ram Institute of Technology was established on 9 July 2001 by S P Kosta, an educator and electronics scientist, and Prof. N. George. They are also the heads of the Shri Ram Group.

== Campus ==
The institute is located in Jabalpur, approximately two kilometres from Kachnar City a popular locality in Jabalpur city. Located near ITI Madhotal, the campus is 35 acres (14 ha) in size. It provides courses in more than 20 undergraduate and postgraduate programs.

== Affiliation and accreditation ==
SRIT Jabalpur is affiliated with two universities in Madhya Pradesh, namely Rajiv Gandhi Proudyogiki Vishwavidyalaya in Bhopal and Rani Durgavati University in Jabalpur. The college has been accredited by the All India Council for Technical Education, the PCI of New Delhi and the Government of Madhya Pradesh.

== Admission ==
Admission to the Bachelor of Engineering course is based on the Joint Entrance Examination. At the post-graduate level, a candidate must qualify under the Graduate Aptitude Test in Engineering.

== Courses ==
Shri Ram Institute of Technology, Jabalpur offers both under-graduate and post-graduate courses.

- Bachelor of Engineering
- Master of Engineering/Technology
- Master of Computer Applications
- Master of Business Administration
- Bachelor of Pharmacy
- Master of Pharmacy

=== Bachelor of Engineering ===
The Bachelor of Engineering is a four-year program consisting of the following streams:

- Computer Science and Engineering
- Civil Engineering
- Electrical Engineering
- Electrical & Electronics Engineering
- Electronics and Communication Engineering
- Information Technology Engineering
- Mechanical Engineering

=== Master of Engineering ===
The Masters of Engineering is a two-year program offered to Engineering graduates in the following streams:

- ME in Electronics and Communication Engineering
- ME in Computer Science & Engineering (CSE)
- ME in System Software(SS)
- ME in Heat Power Engineering
- M. Tech. in Microwave Engineering
- M. Tech. in VLSI Design
- M.Tech. in Computer Technology & Application (CTA)
- M. Tech. in Power System
- M. Tech. in Machine Design

== Rankings ==
| Year | Description | Survey |
|---|---|---|
| 2017 | Shri Ram Institute of Technology recently has prestigious ranks in the Times Engineering Institute Ranking Survey 2017 conducted by Times of India. The institute secured 1st rank among private engineering institutes in Jabalpur, 1st position among private engineering institutes of Madhya Pradesh and finally 66th rank among Top 150 Engineering Institute in India, | Times of India |
| 2017 | The institute secured 1st rank among All private engineering institutes in Jabalpur and 16th rank among Top private T-schools 2017 in India. | Dataquest |
| 2016 | The institute secured 1st rank among All private engineering institutes in Jabalpur, 2nd rank in MP & 33rd rank among Top private T-schools 2016 in India. | Dataquest |
| 2016 | The institute secured 1st rank among All private engineering institutes in Jabalpur, 3rd rank in MP & 68th rank Top private Engineering institute in India. | Times of India |
| 2015 | The Institute was ranked 2nd amongst engineering colleges in Madhya Pradesh and 55th overall in a 2015 survey of private engineering and technical colleges in India | Dataquest |
| 2014 | The Institute was ranked 96th in a 2014 survey of engineering institutes conducted by Times Engineering | Times of India |
