= Rahas Bihari Dwivedi =

Sanskrit scholar and poet (born 1947)

Rahas Bihari Dwivedi (Sanskrit: रहसबिहारीद्विवेदः, born 2 January 1947) is a Sanskrit scholar and poet from Jabalpur, Madhya Pradesh. He was awarded the President's Certificate of Honour for Sanskrit in 2012. He was formerly the head of the Department of Sanskrit at Rani Durgavati University, Jabalpur.

== Life ==
Rahas Bihari was born in Allahabad, Uttar Pradesh. He obtained an Acharya (Master of Arts) degree in Sanskrit literature and followed it by the Sahitya Ratna and MLitt degrees. He obtained his PhD degree from the Rani Durgavati University in 1977 with his thesis on critical study of Sanskrit epic poems composed in the 1960s. Later he joined the university as a Sanskrit professor and supervised 16 doctoral theses during his tenure. He also holds the post-doctoral Vidyavachaspati degree.

== Major works ==
Rahas Bihari Dwivedi has authored several books and more than 50 papers in Sanskrit, Hindi and English. Some of them are:

- A Critical Study of the Saṃskṛta Mahākāvyas composed in the 7th Decade (संस्कृत महाकाव्यों का समालोचनात्मक अध्ययन १९६१-१९७० तक) (1977) — PhD thesis at the Rani Durgavati University, Jabalpur. In this thesis, he listed 156 epic poems in Sanskrit composed between 1947 and 1970.
- Arvācīnasaṃskṛtamahākāvyānuśīlanam (अर्वाचीनसंस्कृतमहाकाव्यानुशीलनम्) (1981) - A Sanskrit treatise on modern Sanskrit epics in 134 pages. Published by Sagarika Samiti in Sagar.
- Sāhityavimarśaḥ (साहित्यविमर्शः) (2002) - A collection of research articles on the Indian literature. Published by Sampurnanand Sanskrit University. ISBN 8172700954, 9788172700959.
- Svastisandeśaḥ (स्वस्तिसन्देशः)
- Svaritasandeśaḥ (स्वरितसन्देशः)
- Saṃskṛtavāṅmaye Vijñānam (संस्कृतवाङ्मये विज्ञानम्)
- Tīrthabhāratam (तीर्थभारतम्) (2010) - Poem on Indian pilgrimage places

== Awards and honours ==
- President's Certificate of Honour for Sanskrit (2012).
- Valmiki Puraskar by Uttar Pradesh Sanskrit Sansthan (2016).
