= Onkar Nath Srivastava =

Indian material physicist (1942–2021)

- Born: 31 December 1942; Varanasi, Benares State, British Raj (now in Uttar Pradesh, India)
- Died: 24 April 2021 (aged 78); Varanasi, India
- Occupation: Material physicist
- Years active: 1968–2021
- Known for: Nanotechnology; Hydrogen energy
- Spouse: Madhur Srivastava
- Children: 2
- Awards: Padma Shri; Shanti Swarup Bhatnagar Prize; ISCA Homi J. Bhabha Award; Goyal Award; K. S. Rao Memorial Award; MRSI–ICSC Award

Onkar Nath Srivastava (31 December 1942 – 24 April 2021) was an Indian material physicist, an Emeritus professor of Banaras Hindu University and the vice president for India and South Asia of the International Association for Hydrogen Energy, who was known for his contributions to the disciplines of nanotechnology and hydrogen energy. He was the author of two books and over 440 scientific papers and a recipient of several honors including Shanti Swarup Bhatnagar Prize, the highest Indian award in the science and technology categories. The Government of India awarded him the fourth highest civilian honour of the Padma Shri, in 2016, for his contributions to science and engineering.

== Biography ==
Srivastava was born on 31 December 1942, in Varanasi, the holy city of Lord Shiva in the Indian state of Uttar Pradesh. He secured his master's degree in Physics (MSc) in 1961 from Banaras Hindu University (BHU) and followed it up with a doctoral degree (PhD) from the same institution, under the guidance of renowned physicist Ajit Ram Verma, in 1966. After doing his post doctoral research at Cornell University, USA, he returned to India to start his career as a lecturer at Banaras Hindu University where he served in different capacities as that of a reader, professor, head of the department of physics and the coordinator of the Centre of Advance Studies-Hydrogen Energy Centre. After his superannuation from service, he continues his association with the university as a professor emeritus and as an associate faculty member of Condensed Matter Experiment research program of the university.

Srivastava, a former member of the board of directors of The World Academy of Sciences, was the vice president (India & South Asia) of the International Association of Hydrogen Energy, having been elected to the position in 2012, where he also serves as a member of their editorial board. Under his guidance, the Hydrogen Energy Centre of BHU was involved in advance research on the practical applications of hydrogen fuel, in association with the Ministry of New and Renewable Energy and the Department of Science and Technology (DST), of the Government of India. He published two books, Crystallography Applied to Solid State Physics and Formation and phase stability of Al based quasicrystals: Quasicrystal and over 440 scientific papers. He delivered keynote addresses in a number of science seminars and undertook several projects for various government agencies; Nanoscience and Technology of the Department of Science and Technology (2005–2010), Support to Hydrogen Energy Centre (2007–2012), Development & Demonstration of Hydrogen Catalytic Combustion Cookers (2007–2010), Development & Demonstration of Hydrogen Fueled three wheelers (2009–2012), Mission Mode Project on Hydrogen Storage Materials (Hydride) (2009–2014), all of the Ministry of New and Renewable Energy, and Synthesis Characterization and Properties of Single Walled Carbon Nanotubes (2009–2012) of the Defence Research and Development Organization are some of the notable ones. He was also involved in organizing science conferences and mentored 87 doctoral students.

Srivastava died from COVID-19 in April 2021.

== Books ==
- A. R. Verma; O. N. Srivastava (1991). Crystallography Applied to Solid State Physics. New Age International. ISBN 978-81-224-0321-3.
- Thakur Prasad Yadav, Onkar Nath Srivastava (2012). Formation and phase stability of Al based quasicrystals: Quasicrystal. LAP LAMBERT Academic Publishing. p. 216. ISBN 978-3847320883 – via Amazon.

== Awards and honors ==
S. No.	Awards and special honors	Agency/Organization carrying out the survey\offering the awards	Purpose and Nature of Award
1	Padma Shri (2016)	Government of India	For citations of research work
2	Top 2% scientists of the world (2020)	Stanford University	Materials
3	National Research Award (2019) (Nano Science & Technology)	Department of Science & Technology (Govt. of India)	For significant work in nanoscience (CNM) & its application for Hydrogen energy
4	NASI-Senior Scientist (2019)	National Academy of Sciences, India	Excellent work in the field of Nanoscience and Hydrogen Energy
5	The International Association of Hydrogen Energy has established IJHE Onkar N. Srivastava Award to be presented at the WHEC Conference Gala Dinner to the authors of the most cited Fuel Cells related paper during the previous odd year (2018).	International Association of Hydrogen Energy	To recognize excellent work done in the field of Hydrogen Energy
6	IPA Award (BARC) for Excellence in Applied Physics (2014)	Indian Physical Association (IPA)	To honor eminent scientist involved in applied research
7	Lifetime Achievement Award in the field of Electron Microscope-EMSI (2014)	Electron Microscopy Society of India	To recognize sustained work in Electron Microscopy
8	MRSI-ICSC Award (2009)	Materials Research Society of India	For Superconductivity works
9	Bharat Excellence Award (Friendship Society of India) (1997)	Public award	To recognize well known scientist
10	Awarded K.S. Rao Memorial Award on Renewable Energy (1995)	Solar Energy Society of India (by KS Rao Trust)	For Outstanding work in Hydrogen Energy
11	FNA: Fellow of Indian National Science Academy (New Delhi) (1994)	INSA, New Delhi	To recognize research of Indian Scientist
12	Goyal Award in Physical Sciences (1993)	Goyal Foundation	For Outstanding work in Hydrogen Energy
13	Homi J. Bhabha Award for Applied Sciences (2002)	University Grants Commission	for R&D* in Hydrogen Energy to honour eminent scientist
14	FNASc.: Fellow of National Academy of Sciences (Allahabad) (1989)	Science Academy, Allahabad	To recognize work of eminent scientist
15	Shanti Swaroop Bhatnagar Award in Physical Sciences (1988)	Awarded by Council of Scientific and Industrial Research (New Delhi)	To honour path breaking research in Physical Science

In 1988, The Council of Scientific and Industrial Research (CSIR) awarded Srivastava the Shanti Swarup Bhatnagar Prize, the highest Indian science award for his contributions on high temperature oxide superconductors, growth, characterization and application of hydrogen storage materials. He received the Goyal Prize in Physical Sciences and K. S. Rao Memorial Award on Renewable Energy in 2000 and two years later, the Indian Science Congress Association awarded him the 2002 Homi J. Bhabha Award in Applied Sciences. In 2009, he was recognized by the ICSC with the Material Research Society of India-ICSC Award. The National Academy of Sciences, India elected him as their fellow in 1989, followed by the Indian National Science Academy in 1994 and the International Association of Hydrogen Energy in 2010. He was also an elected fellow of the Asia Pacific Academy of Materials, International Academy of Physical Sciences and the New York Academy of Sciences.

== See also ==
- Ajit Ram Verma
- Nanotechnology
- List of Banaras Hindu University people
