= Yogesh Mohan Tiwari =

Indian diplomat

Yogesh Mohan Tiwari was an Indian diplomat. He was an officer of the Indian Foreign Service 1966 batch. He was a graduate of Government Science College, Jabalpur and St Stephen's College, Delhi. He served as India's ambassador to Singapore, Cyprus, Austria, Slovenia, Kenya and Eritrea. He also served as India's permanent representative to the IAEA and UNIDO in Vienna. His elder brother was Vishwa Mohan Tiwari, a retired air vice marshal, Indian Air Force. Ambassador Tiwari died in December 2019.
