= Atma Ram (scientist) =

Indian scientist (1908–1983)

- Born: 12 October 1908
- Died: 6 February 1983 (aged 74); Delhi, India
- Awards: Padma Shri (1959)
- Scientific career
- Fields: Chemistry
- Workplaces: Central Glass and Ceramic Research Institute; Council of Scientific and Industrial Research

Atma Ram (12 October 1908 – 6 February 1983) was an Indian scientist. In his memory, the Atmaram Award is given by the Central Institute of Hindi, an autonomous institute run by the Ministry of Human Resource Development of the Government of India. He was the Director of Central Glass and Ceramic Research Institute and assumed the post of Director General of Council of Scientific and Industrial Research on 21 August 1966. He was also Principal Advisor to Prime Minister and Union Cabinet on Science and Technology from 1977 to 1983.

The Government of India honoured him in 1959, with the award of Padma Shri, the fourth highest Indian civilian award for his contributions.

Dr. Atma Ram was born in Pilana village, Chandpur in Bijnor, Uttar Pradesh. His father name was Lala Bhagwandas.

== Education ==
- B. SC, Kanpur
- M.Sc., Allahabad
- Ph.D., Allahabad

== Honours and awards ==
- Shanti Swarup Bhatnagar Award (1959)
- Plaque of Honour, All India Glass Manufacturers Federation (1964)
- Padma Shri (1959)

== See also ==
- List of Indian scientists
