= Charotar University of Science and Technology =

Science and technology university in Gujarat, India

- Former name: Education Campus Changa
- Motto: Knowledge is eternal
- Type: Private
- Established: 2001
- Affiliations: UGC, AICTE
- President: Surendra Patel
- Provost: Dr. Atul Patel
- Location: Changa, Gujarat, India; 22°35′58″N 72°49′13″E
- Website: www.charusat.ac.in

Charotar University of Science and Technology (CHARUSAT) is a private university in Gujarat, India.

== History ==
The founder-president of the Kelavani mandal, Chhotabhai Bhikhabhai Patel, and K.C. Patel, who succeeded him worked on the idea of a university at Education Campus, Changa (ECC). ECC started with the establishment of Charotar Institute of Technology - Changa (CITC) as the first institute which is now known as Chandubhai S. Patel Institute of Technology (CSPIT) in the year 2000.

With the need for autonomy, the ECC applied for university status at UGC and Gujarat Government, which was granted on July 7, 2009, when the ECC was accorded the status of University and Charotar University of Science and Technology was established.

== Campus ==
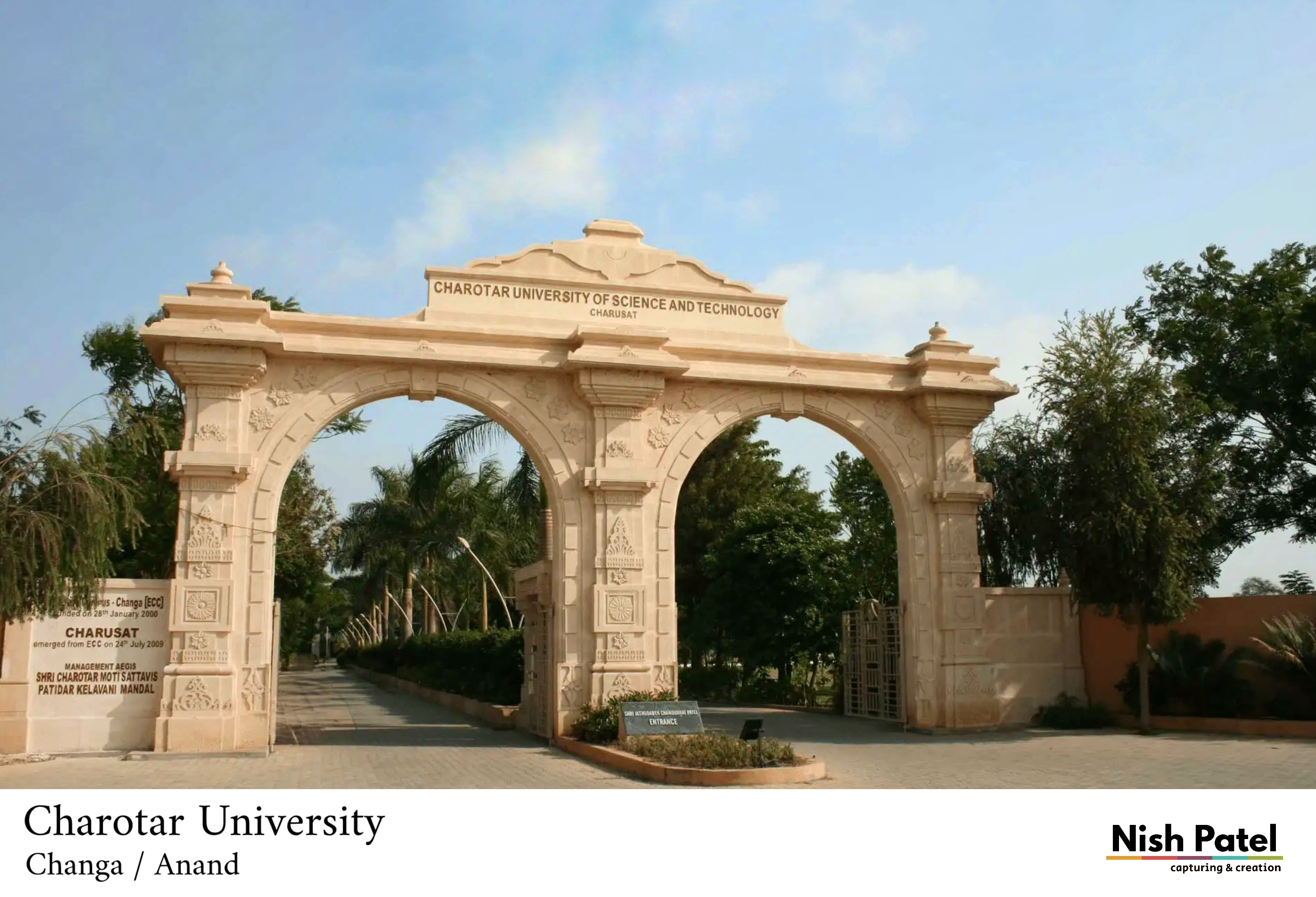
Charotar University Campus Gate

The university is situated in the village of Changa, a Charotar Moti Sattavis Patidar Samaj. Charotar is the region comprising the Anand and Kheda districts of Gujarat. The university has about 1700 faculty members and 8000 students.

== Rankings ==
University rankings

General – India
- NIRF (Universities) (2022): 151–200

Charusat has recently got Aplus ranking by NAAC and CHARUSAT has been ranked in the 151–200 band among universities in India by the National Institutional Ranking Framework (NIRF) in 2022.
