= Indian 2-rupee note =

Two Rupees
- Country: India
- Value: ₹2
- Security features: Watermark
- Years of printing: 1943 to 1995

Obverse
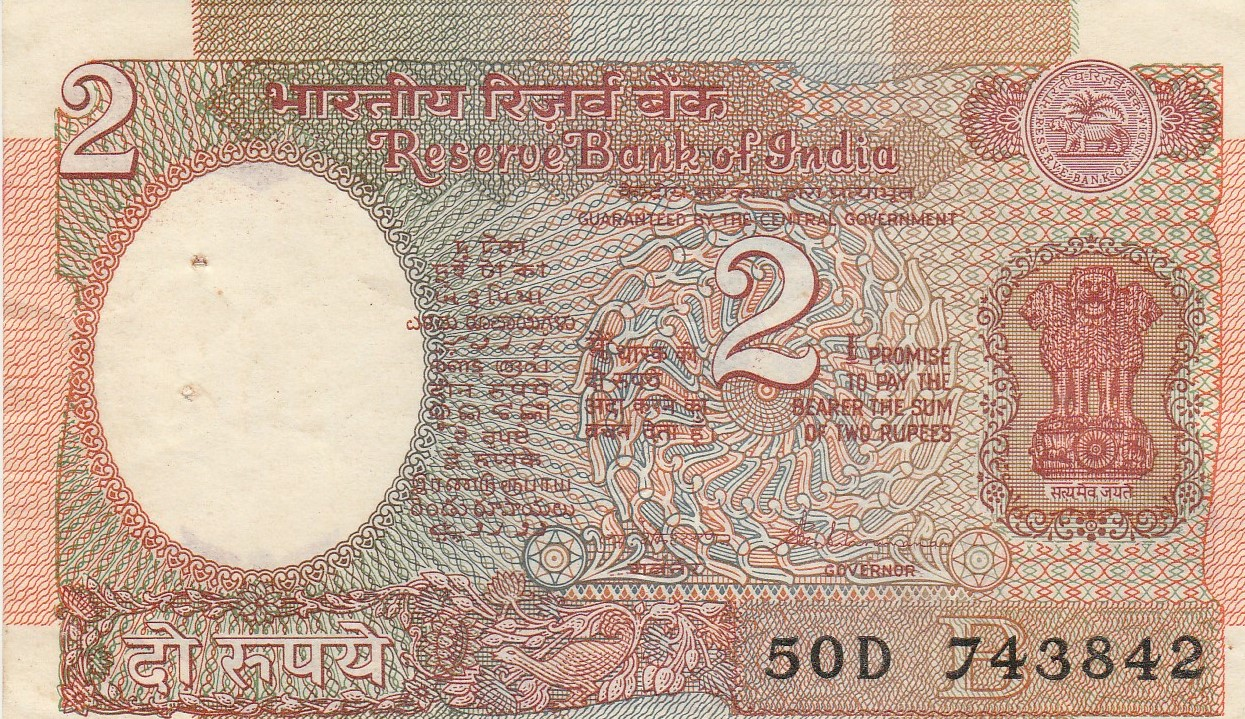
- Design: Lion Capital

Reverse
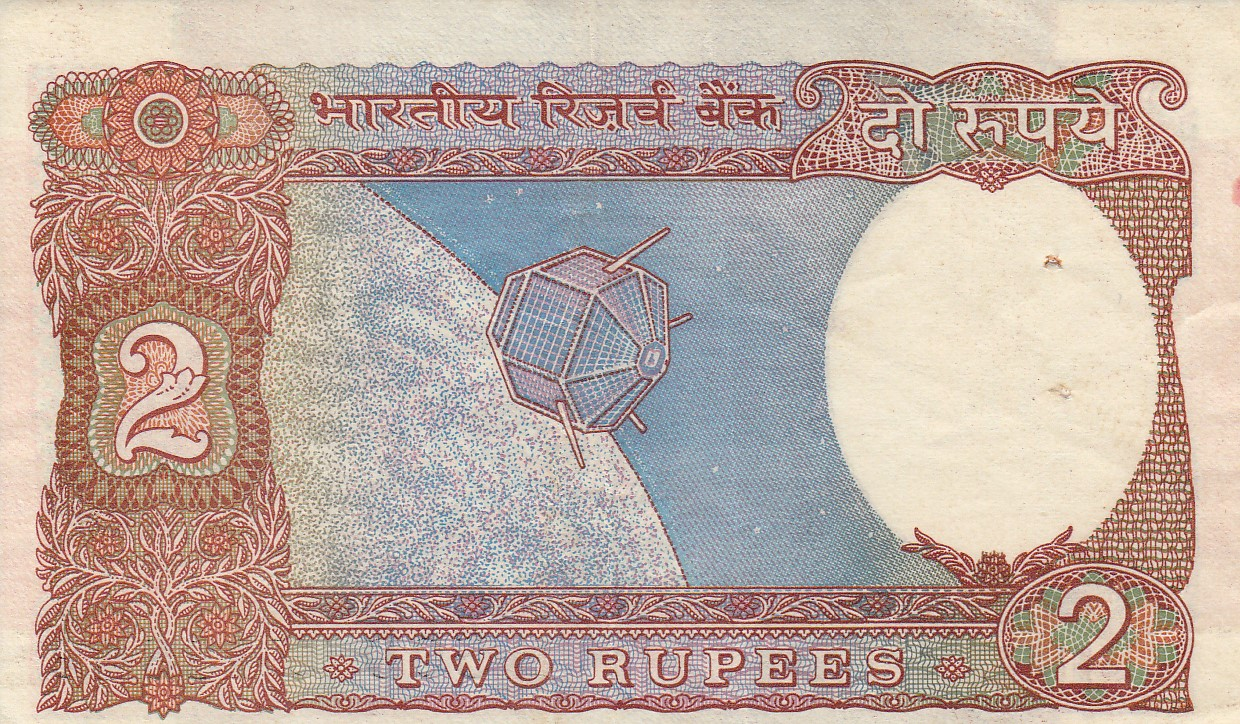
- Design: Aryabhata satellite

The Indian 2-rupee note (₹2) was a denomination of Rupee introduced in 1943. It is the second smallest note ever printed in India. It was removed from circulation in 1995.

== Gallery ==
King George VI

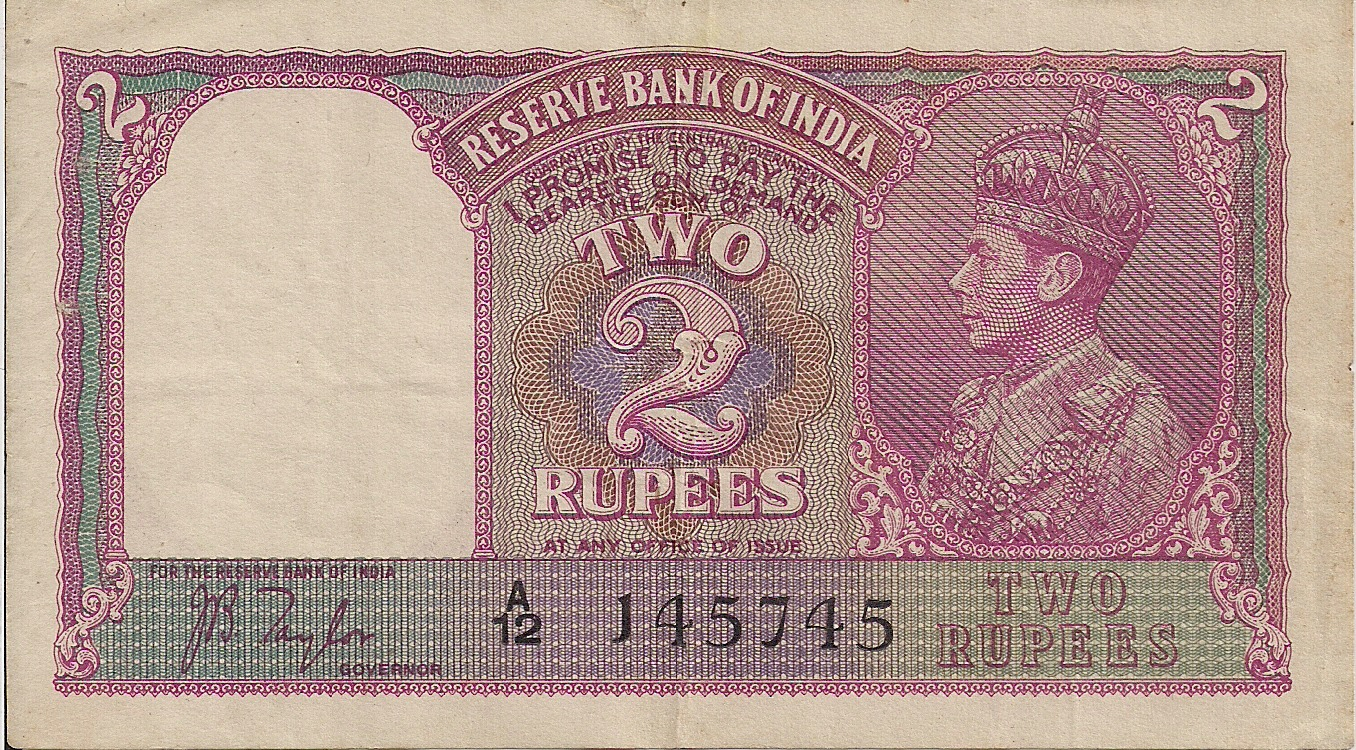
British India 2 rupee note with King George VI's portrait signed by RBI Governor J B Taylor

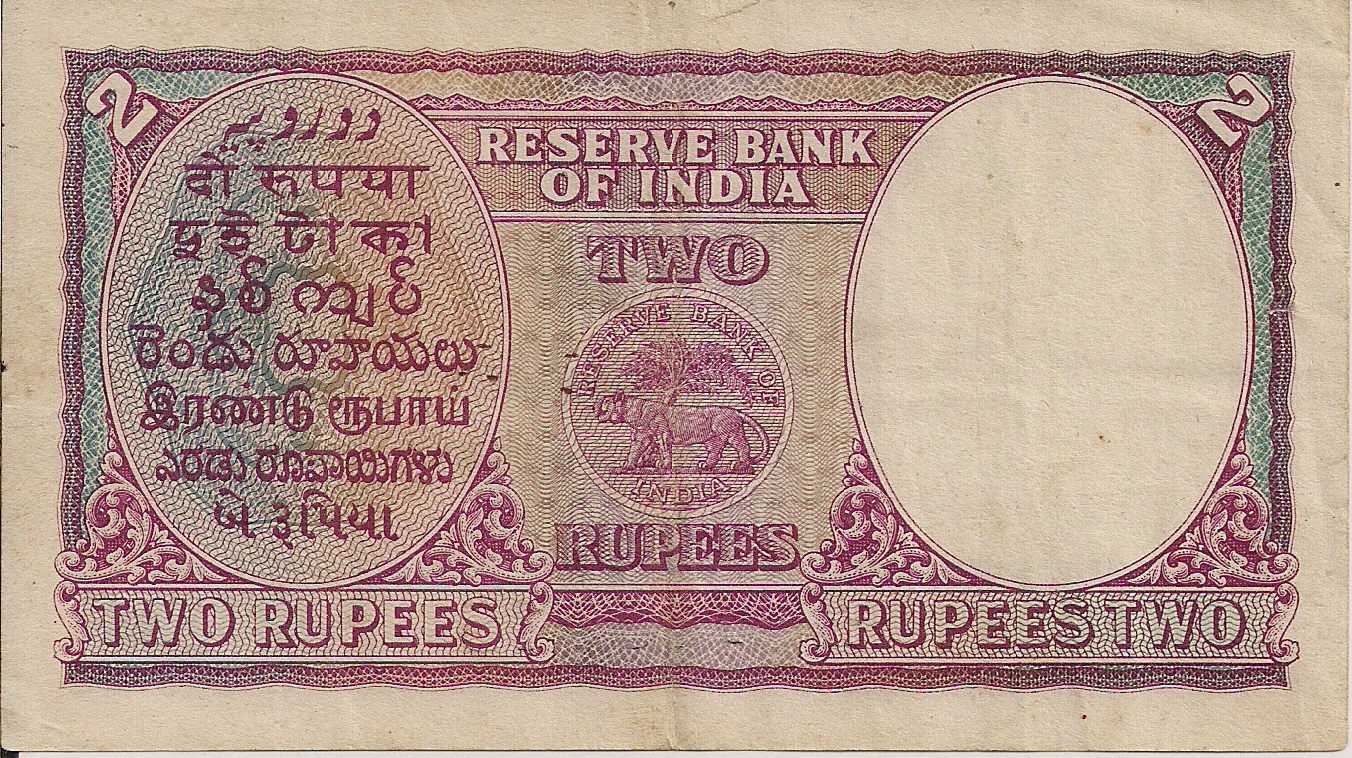
British India 2 rupee note with King George VI's portrait (Reverse)

Aryabhata

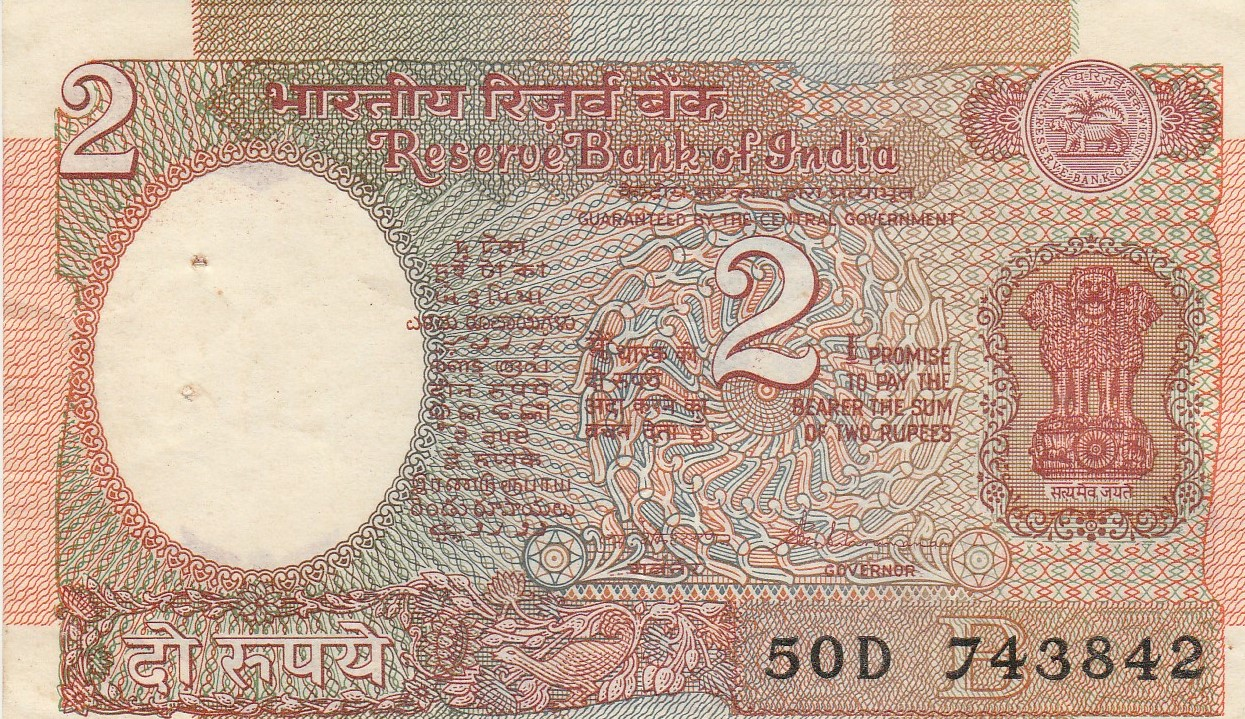
Signed by RBI Governor S. Venkitaramanan

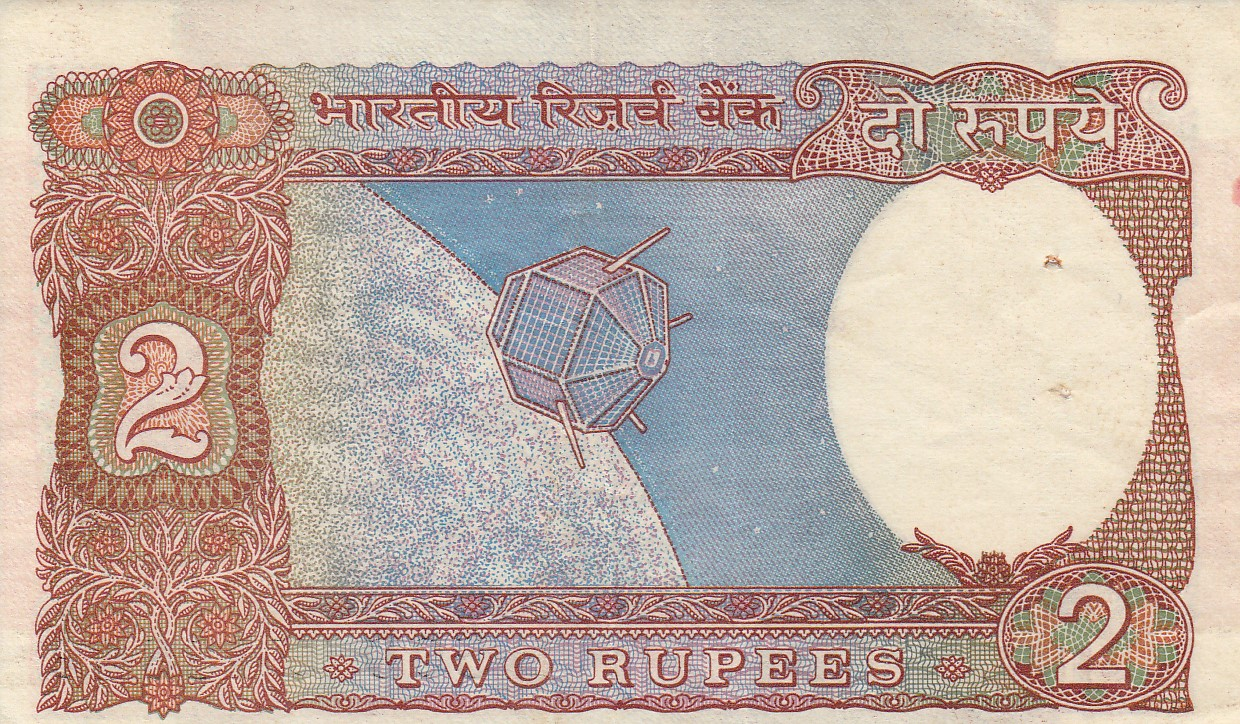
Aryabhata, India's first satellite
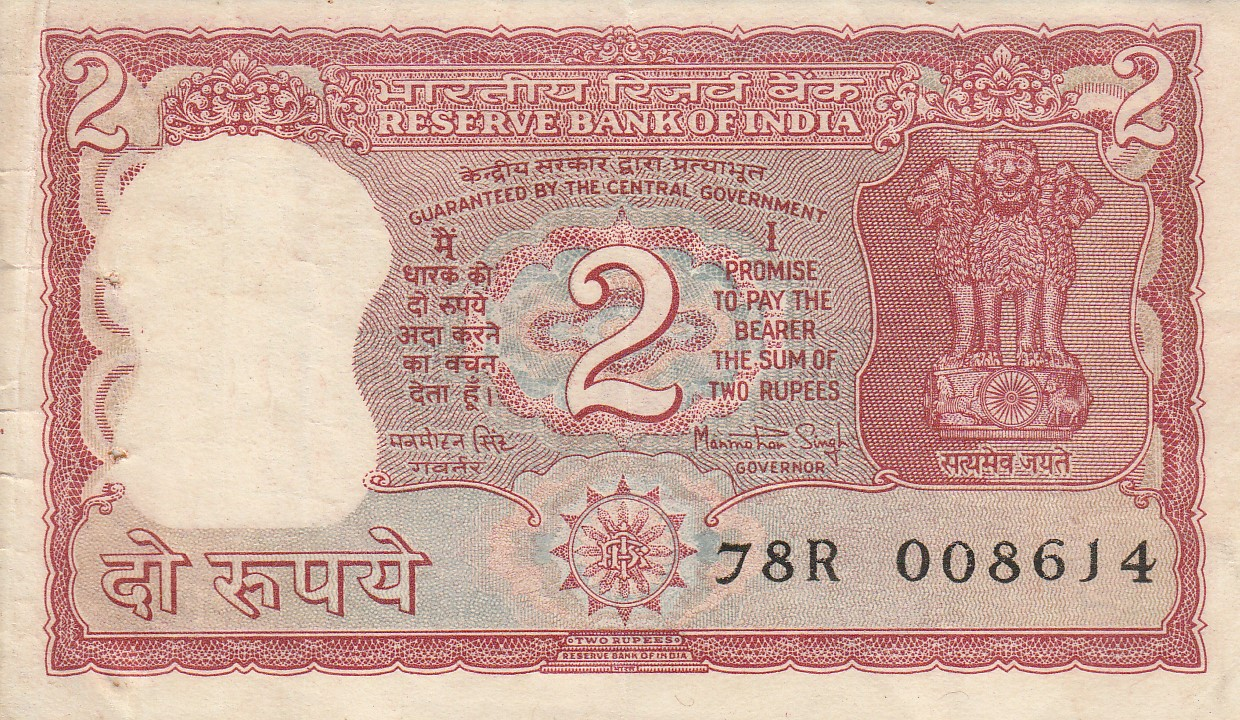
Signed by RBI Gov. Manmohan Singh

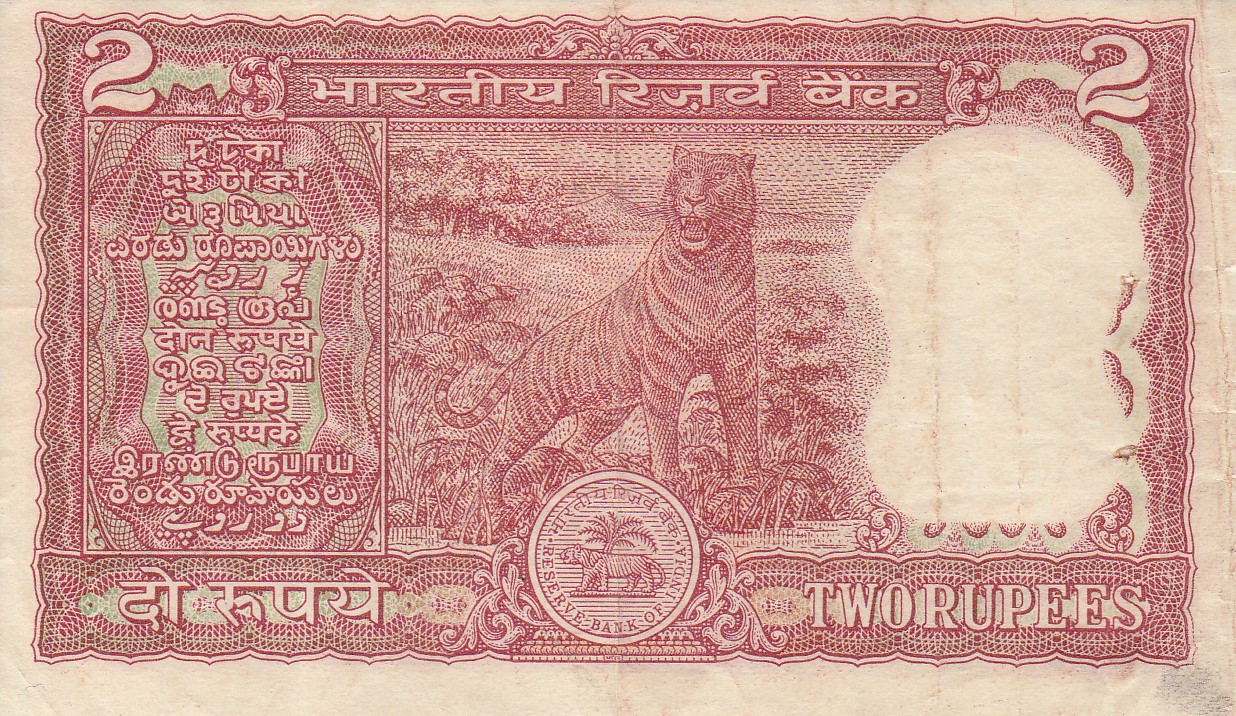
A Tiger

1949

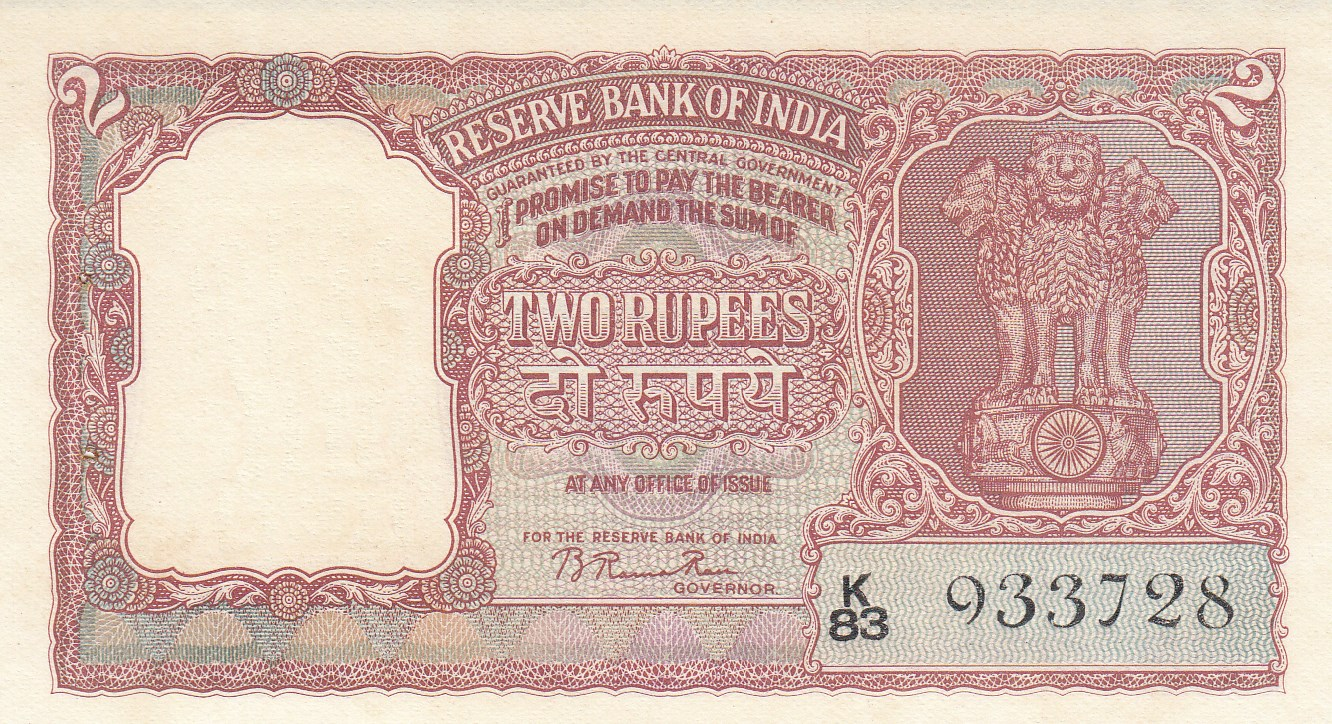
1949 2 rupees note

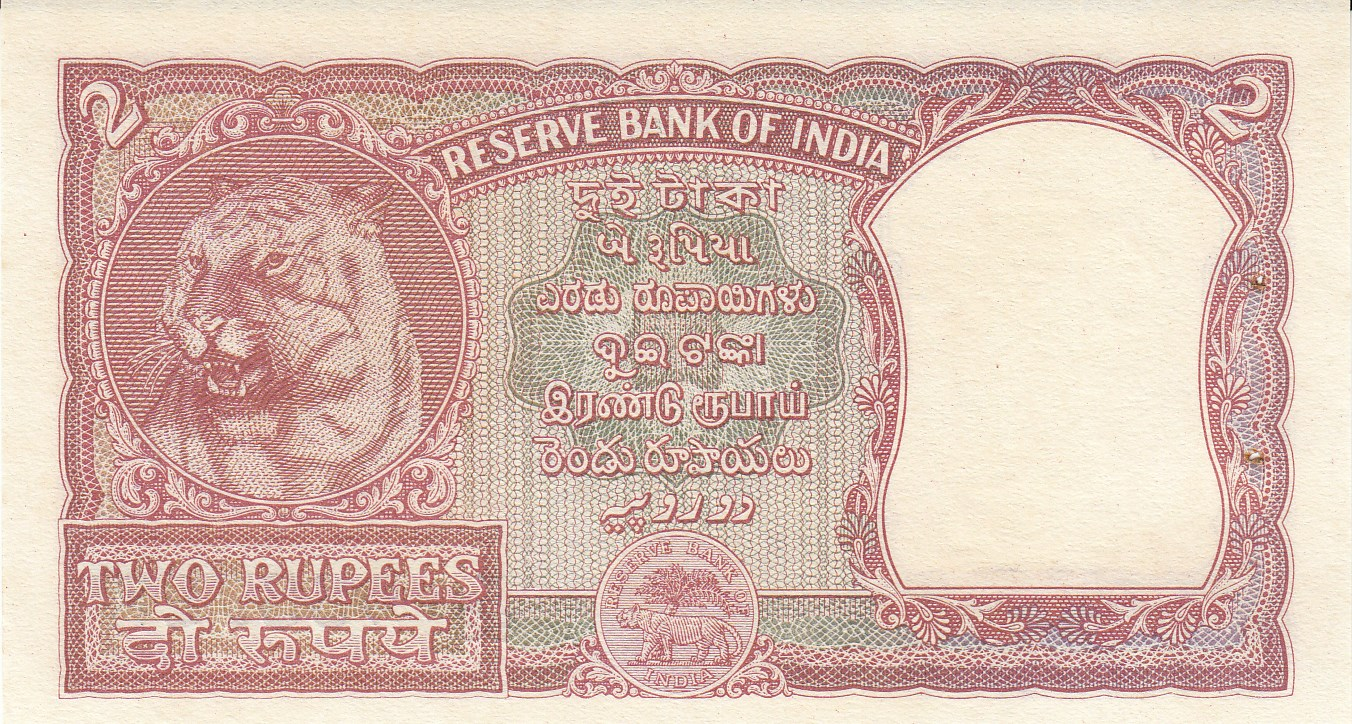
1949 2 rupees note with Tiger's face

Mahathma Gandhi

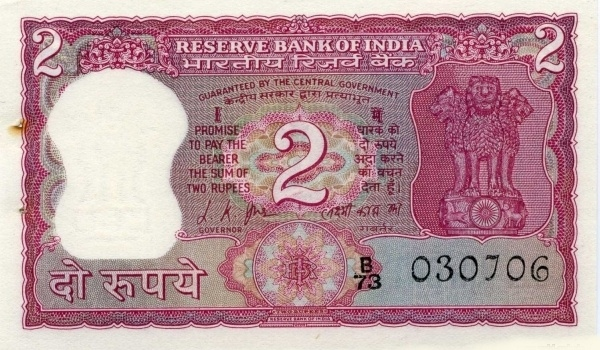
1969-70

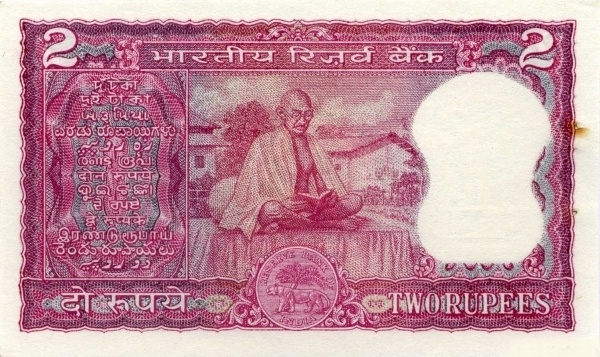
Depiction of Mahathma Gandhi

== See also ==
- Indian 5-rupee note
- Indian 2-rupee coin
