= Munder Sharma =

Indian politician

Member of Parliament, Lok Sabha
- In office 1980–1982
- Preceded by: Sharad Yadav
- Succeeded by: Baburao Paranjpe
- Constituency: Jabalpur

Personal details
- Born: 15 March 1922 Maghar Thana Village, Sivan District, Bihar, British India
- Died: 1982 [?]
- Party: Indian National Congress
- Spouse: Chandre Jyoti Devi

Munder Sharma was an Indian politician. He was elected to the Lok Sabha, lower house of the Parliament of India from the Jabalpur constituency of Madhya Pradesh as a member of the Indian National Congress.
