= Vishwa Mohan Tiwari =

Indian writer and meditation teacher

Vishwa Mohan Tiwari (born February 1935) is an Indian creative writer, advisor, poet and meditation teacher. He is the author of 17 of his own books and 9 translated books. In 1998 he received the Atmaram Award.

== Personal life ==
Tiwari was born in Jabalpur, a city in Madhya Pradesh, India. His mother was Vimla Devi and father Har Narayan who was the principal of Hitakarni Higher Secondary School in a place called Devtaal in Garha a district in Jabalpur. His father was awarded by National teacher's award in 1972 from India's president V.V. Giri.

He got married in 1962 at age 27. His brother was the retired diplomat Yogesh Mohan Tiwari.

== Education ==
He has done Master of Technology (M.Tech.) in Aviation Electronic from Cranfield Institute of Technology, UK in 1966 and BE in Electronics and Telecommunication from Jabalpur Engineering College in 1956.

== Government service ==
Tiwari is a retired Air Vice Marshal a 2 Star Air Officer rank. He retired on 28 February 1991 and started as a writer, poet and medication teacher with that he also contributed in social servicing for 14 years from 2007 to 2014 by being a teacher and also taking the responsibility as Secretary General at Baal Vikaas Bhaaraatee (BVB).

== Awards ==
- 1990: Indira Gandhi National award for technical writing by Vice President of India for his book on Electronic Warfare Electroniki Yuddh Kala (Bhartiya Seva Sansthan, 1989)
- 1994: Awarded Indira Gandhi National award for Technical Writing by the President of India for his book in Hindi Khaari Yuddh (Bhartiya Seva Sansthan, 1991), and in English The High Tech War of Twentieth century with RK Tewari, published by Vikas Publishers, New Delhi
- 1998: Atmaram Award, awarded by the President of India for his book The Joy of Bird Watching in English and in Hindi Anand Panchi Niharan Ka

== Work ==
He can speak French, English and Hindi. He was editor of Authors Guild Of India's magazine for 10 years, and editor of hindi.kalkion.com from 2010 to 2014.

=== Books ===
- Bayghar (Anthology of Poems) -B.S.Sansthan 1987
- Electroniki Yuddh Kalaa ( Electronic Warfare) -B.S.Sansthan 1989
- Saral Vedic Ganit, B.S.Sansthan 1990
- Zindigi Phir Phir Meray Kareeb Hai (Travelogues) -B.S.Sansthan, Gaziabad 1991.
- Gulf War 91 (Hindi), Bhagirath Sewa Sansthan 1991
- The High Tech War Of Twentieth Century, with Dr. R K Tewari, Vikas Pub 1996
- Aanand Panchhee Nihaaran Kaa, NBT 1998
- Upagraha ke Baahar Bheetar, with Dr. R K Tewari, Publications Division 2001
- Sabsay Balawaan Kaun, Pitambar Publication 2002
- Joy Of Bird Watching (English), NBT (National Book Trust) 2002
- Bodhi Wraksha Kay Neechay (Hindi Poems, Medha Prakashan 2003
- Hindi Yaatraa Saahitya Kaa Itihaas, Aalekh Prakaashan 2004
- Vijnynaan Kaa Aanand, Aalekh Prakaashan 2005
- Chhawiyaan aur Chhawiyaan (Photo – Vishwa Mohan, Poems – PratapSehgal) Kitab Ghar 2005
- Missileman Abdul kalaam– Vaigyanik Drishtikon, Jaipur 2009
- Suno Manu, Kitab Ghar, 2010
- Nai Dishaa, Alekha Prakaashan 2010
- Kyaa Raamaayana men Uttarakaand Prakshep hai., Booklet 2011

=== Translation of books ===
(English to Hindi = EH, Hindi to English = HE)

- Kirnon Kaa Rahasyamaya Sansaar, 1975 (HE)
- Safed Raatayn Kaalay Din, 1977 (Swedish to English to Hindi)
- Vedic Ganit (EH) Mathematics, Motilal Banarasi Das 1991
- Ignis Shattered by Divik Ramesh (HE) with A. Prakash, Writers Workshop, Kolkata. 2003
- Bayghar (Hindi to Uriyaa), Trans. Dr. Sudhanshu Nayak, Vidya Sagar Pub. Katak 2004
- Five Hindi Poets (HE) Sampark Prakaashan, 2004
- My Favourite Stories (Children) (EH) Pitambar Publication, Delhi 2004
- Ek Chidiyaa Kaa Giranaa Autobiography of Salim Ali (EH) N.B.T. 2005 (The fall of a sparrow).
- Mat ro Ekaakee Darpan Poems of Deepa Agarwal, 2010 (EH)
