= Central Training Institute Jabalpur =

Central Training Institute
- Type: Engineering training institute; Civil Service training institute
- Established: 2006
- Affiliations: MPPKVVCL
- Principal: Dr. A. K. Tiwari
- Director: Kavita Batla
- Location: Jabalpur, Madhya Pradesh, India; 23.10°N 79.59°E
- Campus: Nayagaon, Jabalpur, Madhya Pradesh, India
- Website: ctijabalpur.com
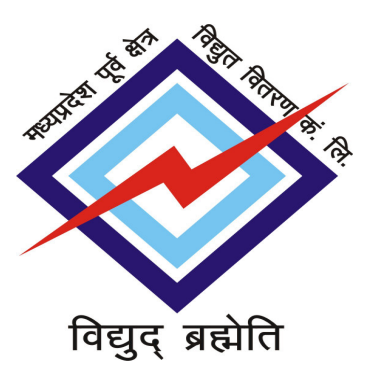

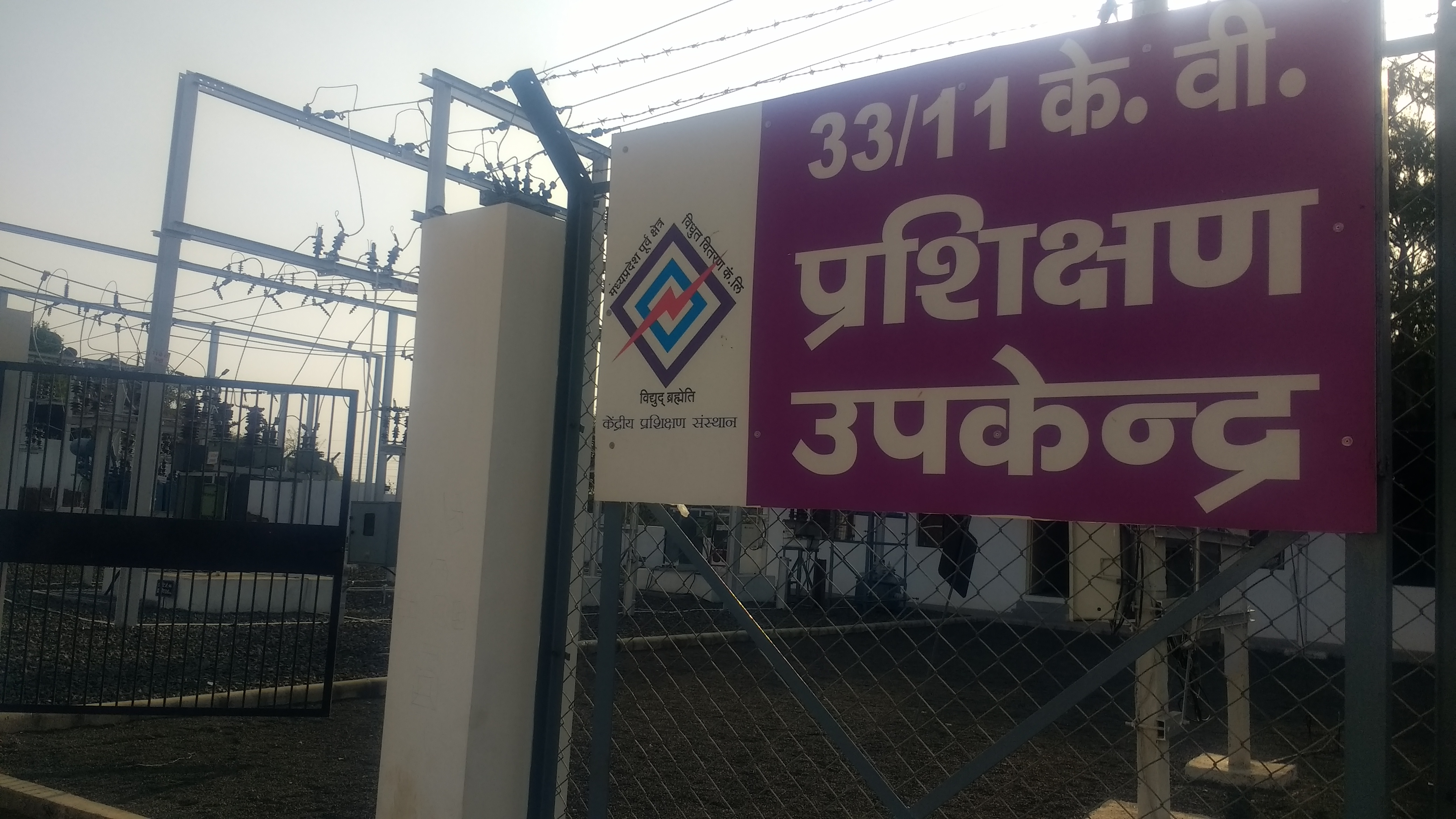

Central Training Institute (Hindi:केंद्रीय प्रशिक्षण संस्थान), popularly known as CTI Jabalpur, is located in Nayagaon, Jabalpur, Madhya Pradesh, India. It is an apex engineering and civil service training institute of the Madhya Pradesh Poorv Kshetra Vidyut Vitaran Company Ltd (MPPKVVCL), wholly owned by the Government of Madhya Pradesh. The institute provides technical and managerial training to assistant engineers, junior engineers, accounts officers, HR managers, office assistants, line men, and testing assistants.

The Institute was established in 2006 after the State Electricity Board split into two divisions, a Power Distribution Engineering division and a Management training Center for employees of MPPKVVCL. The Institute is recognised by the Indian Ministry of Power, and is a partner training institute of the Power Finance Corporation and the Rural Electrification Corporation. The institute is an ISO 9001:2008 certified training institute.

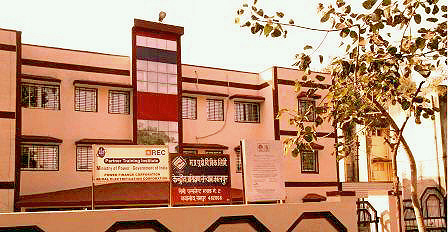
Central Training Institute building

== Training courses ==
Several training courses are offered by the institute, including but not limited to the following:

=== Technical training for engineers in the power sector ===
Courses for technical training for engineers in the power sector include: Power Purchase and Power Trading; SCADA and Distribution Automation; Protection Systems in a substation; Energy Conservation and Energy Auditing; High Voltage Distribution System; Industry Best Practices and Benchmarking Power Sector Performance; Availability Based Tariff (ABT) and Open Access; Automation and Information Technology in the Power Sector; Enterprise Resource Planning (ERP) and its implementation in the Power Sector; SMART GRID technology and application; IT Security in DISCOM; GIS applications in Power distribution; and the SCADA Security system.

=== Training for working officers on Best practices in Power Distribution in Power Sector ===
Training for working officers on Best practices in Power Distribution in Power Sector courses include: Metering Technology and Automated Meter Reading (AMR) Application; Revenue Management and Loss Reduction; General Management in Power Distribution; Efficiency Improvement Measures in Distribution Systems; Operation and Maintenance of substations; Testing and commissioning of substation equipment; Earthing Practice in electrical installations; Line and Substation construction practices; Electricity theft- challenges, remedial measures and legal procedures; Contract Management; Revenue management and revenue accounting; Tariff policy; ARR; filing and regulatory compliance; Best Practices in Distribution Operations and Management System; Demand side Management and Distribution Efficiency; Material Management and quality assurance; Project Management- Planning and Control; AUTOCAD for civil and electrical Engineers; Power Distribution Planning; Distribution Network Management; Decentralised and Distributed Generation; TQM and ISO 9000; Energy Audit and AT&C Loss Reduction; IT Application in DISCOM; Financial Management in the Power Industry; Financing energy sector projects; Power Pricing and Purchase Agreements; Performance benchmarking and quality of supply and service; Rural Electrification system planning and design; Finance for the Non-financial Manager in the Power Sector; Energy Law and Policy; Regulatory issues in the power sector; Power Purchase and Techno-Economic issues; e-procurement and e-tendering; and Distribution Franchisee.

=== Management and soft skills training ===
Management and soft skills training courses include: Teamwork and Leadership, Change Management, Labour Laws and Industrial Relations, Customer Orientation and Consumer Relationship, Business Communication, Negotiation Skills, Interpersonal Skills and Emotional Intelligence, Personality Development, Stress Management, Time Management Skills, e-governance, Communication skills, Employee Motivation & Morale Development, Modern Office Management, Organisational Development, Strategic Management, Management Information System.

== Supervisory development program ==
The institute conducts a Supervisory Development Program with modules such as: Role of Supervisors – Supervisory Skills and Development; Team Building Skills; Skills and Qualities of a Supervisor; Occupational Health and Safety; Industrial Safety and Environmental Protection; Stress Management; Total Quality Management and ISO 9000; Effective Communication; Motivation; Group Dynamics and Conflict Management; Creative Problem Solving; Interpersonal Skills and Body Language; Time Management, Role of IT in Operation and Maintenance Management; and Personality Development for Supervisors.

== Infrastructure ==
On campus, the CTI has eight air-conditioned interactive classrooms with audio-visual training aids, two computer centers, a seminar hall, library, research and demonstration labs, NABL accredited Power System Testing Laboratory, workshops, model room, 33/11 KV Training Substation, Library and Yoga Center, hostels, a mess hall, and a transportation facility.

== Hostels ==
The institute has four hostels in the campus and the facilities can accommodate about 100 trainees.

== Board of governance ==
1. Managing Director of MPPKVVCL Shri V Kiran Gopal IAS.

2. CGM (HR&A) of MPPKVVCL Shrimati Kavita Batla

3. Head IT Dr. Vivek Chandra.

4. DGM (HR) Sri Aman Rajak

6. DGM (Training) and Course Director Dr. A. K. Tiwari.

== Head of the institute ==
At present, Dr. A. K. Tiwari., GM (Training) is the head of the Institute.

== Field training ==
The Central Training Institute has dummy L.T. Lines, 11 kV Lines and a distribution transformer on campus and provides training in line erections, transformer installation and replacement, and line patrolling. The CTI also imparts field training at 33/11 kV substation, L.T. Meter Testing, Central Workshop and Major Transformer Repairing Unit of MPPKVVCL for trainees. Fields visits are arranged at the Bargi Hydel Power Station, 220 kV Substations, AMR Cell, Data Centers, SCADA Center and MTRU.

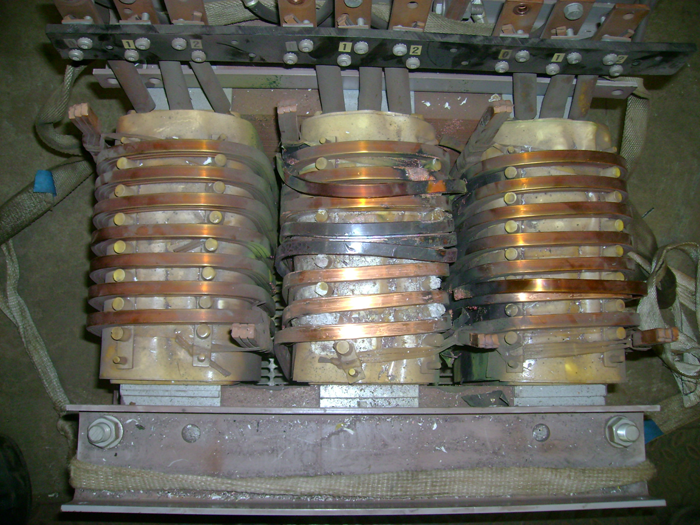
Failed Transformer Windings

== Main faculties ==
Dr. A.K.vTiwari, Dr. Vivek Chandra, Col.S.K. Dharoliya, Geeta Jharoliya, Durga Jharia, Ghaneshwer Jharbade, Bhalchandra Tiwari, Prof. Abhishek Das, Prof. Shweta Gupata, Prof. Kirti Singh, Dr. Abhijat Sahu, Prof. Neha Kandhari, Vivek Ranjan Shrivastava, R.K. Thakur, P.K. Roy, S.K. Mishra are main Faculties and Trainners of the Institute. A.K. Dixit, H.S. Maravi, Vishal Johar, L.B. Bharti are instructors and Laboratory Assistants of the Institute.

== Internship and vocational training ==
CTI provides internship and vocational training options in two, four, and six week course durations to students of engineering colleges and management institutes in: Electrical Engineering, Computer Science, Information Technology, Finance, Accounts and Human Resource Management. The Institute conducts internship and vocational training programmes for the students of IITs, IIMs and NITs.

== Awards and recognition ==
The institute is recognized by The Central Electricity Authority, Ministry of Power, Govt. of India as a Grade-I Power Sector Training Institute. The Institute received several National and International Awards such as CEDIA Award 2011, Education Excellence Award 2012, World Wide Achievers Awards 2017, as Best Corporate Trainer.

== See also ==
- United Nations Institute for Training and Research.
- National Power Training Institute.
- National Personal Training Institute.
- Indian Railways Institute of Electrical Engineering.
