= Rani Durgavati Vishwavidyalaya =

State University in Madhya Pradesh

- Former names: University of Jabalpur
- Type: Public
- Established: 1956; 70 years ago
- Affiliations: UGC
- Chancellor: Governor of Madhya Pradesh
- Vice-Chancellor: Rajesh Kumar Verma
- Location: Jabalpur, Madhya Pradesh, India; 23.161°N 79.979°E
- Campus: Urban
- Website: www.rdunijbpin.org

Rani Durgavati Vishwavidyalaya (Rani Durgavati University), also known as University of Jabalpur, is a government university in Jabalpur, Madhya Pradesh, India. It was named after the queen Rani Durgavati.

== History ==
The university was constituted and established on 12 June 1956 under the Jabalpur University Act, 1956 (Act No. 22 of 1956) with territorial jurisdiction over the Jabalpur revenue district. It shifted to its present location at Saraswati Vihar, Pachpedi, Jabalpur in 1961.

The university was renamed Rani Durgavati Vishwavidyalaya on 7 June 1983 by Act No. 23 of 1983 to honour the well-known valorous Gond Queen of Garha Mandla. It was reconstituted under M. P. Vishwavidyalaya Adhiniyam, 1973 and given jurisdiction over Jabalpur, Mandla, Narsinghpur, Katni, and Dindori.

== Campus ==
The university campus is spread over 99.63 acres (403,200 m^{2}). It accommodates an Administrative Block, Art Faculty building, Teaching and Research buildings of Physics, Chemistry, Mathematics, Bio-Science, System Science and Physical education departments. It has a Central Library, Computer Center, USIC, University Institute of Management, University Law Department and other facilities like one boys' and one girls' hostels, University Health Center, University Guest House, Canteen and residential quarters. Other facilities like post office, bank and printing press are on the campus.

The university has, so far, conducted 73 orientation programmes and 195 refresher courses. Over 7600 teachers have been benefited by these courses.

== Notable faculty and academics ==
- Rajneesh, also known as Osho, was a professor of philosophy at the university. Osho taught at Government Mahakoshal College (of this university). In his honor, as of March 12, 2024 this College has been renamed to Osho Mahakaushal College.
- Kunji Lal Dubey, who subsequently became the speaker, Vidhan Sabha of M.P., was the first vice-chancellor of the university.
- Rahas Bihari Dwivedi, former head of department of Sanskrit, was awarded with the President's Certificate of Honour in Sanskrit in the year 2012.

== Affiliated institutes ==
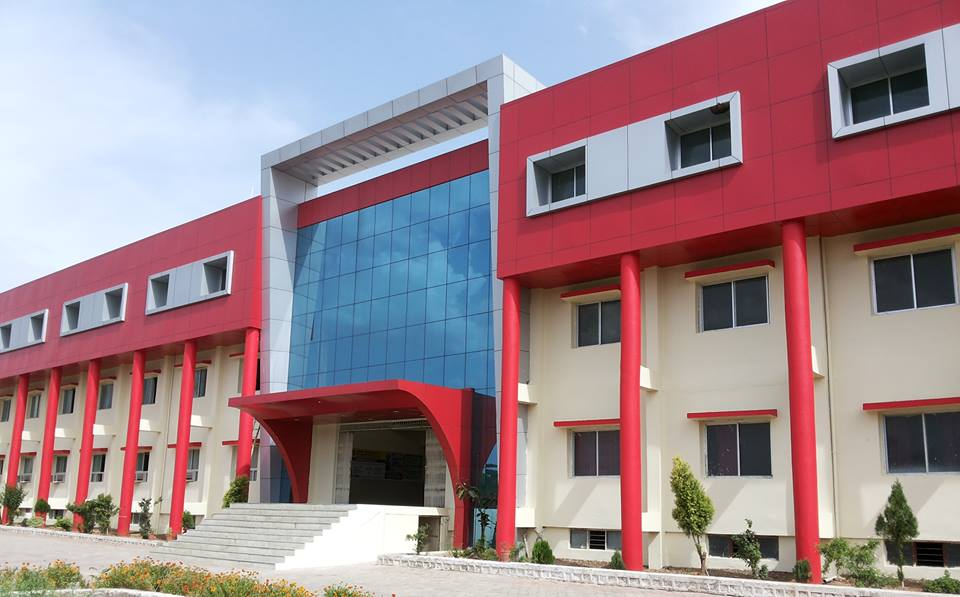
LNCT Jabalpur

Its jurisdiction extends over 5 districts - Dindori, Jabalpur, Katni, Mandla, Narasinghpur .

Notable institutes affiliated with the university include:

- Government Science College, Jabalpur
- Lakshmi Narain College of Technology, Jabalpur
- Mata Gujri Mahila Mahavidyalaya

Colleges offering professional degrees such as the Jabalpur Engineering College and the Netaji Subhash Chandra Bose Medical College, which were once affiliated to RDVV, have now become autonomous or affiliated to specialised universities.
