= Aryabhata (satellite) =

India's first satellite in space (1975–1981)

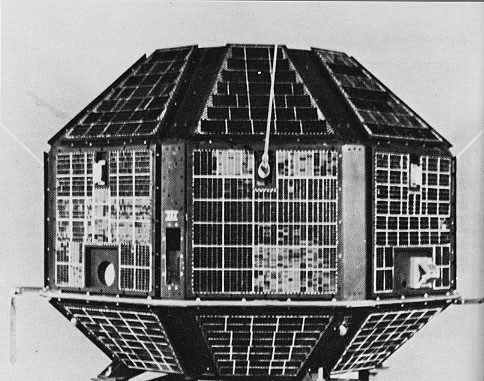
- Aryabhata, India's first indigenously built satellite
- Mission type: Astrophysics
- Operator: ISRO
- COSPAR ID: 1975-033A
- SATCAT no.: 7753
- Mission duration: 5 years, 11 months (Experiments ended during 5th day in orbit)

Spacecraft properties
- Manufacturer: ISRO
- Launch mass: 360 kg (790 lb)
- Dimensions: 1.4 × 1.4 m (4.6 × 4.6 ft)
- Power: 46 watts

Start of mission
- Launch date: 19 April 1975, 07:30 UTC
- Rocket: Kosmos-3M
- Launch site: Kapustin Yar 107/2
- Contractor: Yuzhnoye

End of mission
- Last contact: March 1981
- Decay date: 10 February 1992

Orbital parameters
- Reference system: Geocentric
- Regime: Low Earth
- Perigee altitude: 563 km (350 mi)
- Apogee altitude: 619 km (385 mi)
- Inclination: 50.7 degrees
- Period: 96.46 minutes
- Epoch: 19 May 1975

Transponders
- Bandwidth: 256 bit/sec
- Capacity: 137.44 MHz

Aryabhata was India's first satellite, named after the astronomer of the same name. It was launched on 19 April 1975 from Kapustin Yar, a Soviet rocket launch and development site in Astrakhan Oblast using a Kosmos-3M launch vehicle. It was built by ISRO and launched by the Soviet Union as a part of the Soviet Interkosmos programme which provided access to space for friendly states.

== Launch ==
It was launched on 19 April 1975 from Kapustin Yar, a Russian rocket launch and development site in Astrakhan Oblast, using a Kosmos-3M launch vehicle. It was built by the Indian Space Research Organisation (ISRO). The launch was based on an agreement between India and the Soviet Union directed by UR Rao and signed in 1972. The USSR agreed to launch various Indian satellites in exchange for using Indian ports for tracking ships and launching vessels.

On 19 April 1975, the satellite's 96.46-minute orbit had an apogee of 619 kilometres (385 mi) and a perigee of 563 kilometres (350 mi), at an inclination of 50.7 degrees. It was built to conduct experiments in X-ray astronomy, aeronomics, and solar physics. The spacecraft was a 26-sided polyhedron 1.4 metres (4.6 ft) in diameter. All faces (except the top and bottom) were covered with solar cells supported by a Ni-Cd battery. It employed passive thermal systems and cold gas jets for spin stabilisation. Following launch, the satellite experienced tumbling at 0.3° per second and the aeronomy instrument's power supply failed. However, engineers stabilised the satellite at 50 revolutions/minute by the 45th orbit. A power failure halted experiments after four days and 60 orbits, with all signals from the spacecraft lost after five days of operation. The Spacecraft mainframe remained active till March 1981. The satellite entered Earth's atmosphere on 10 February 1992 due to orbital decay.

== Legacy ==
- It was named after the 6th-century astronomer and mathematician Aryabhata.
- The satellite's image appeared on the reverse of Indian two-rupee banknotes between 1976 and 1997 (Pick catalog).
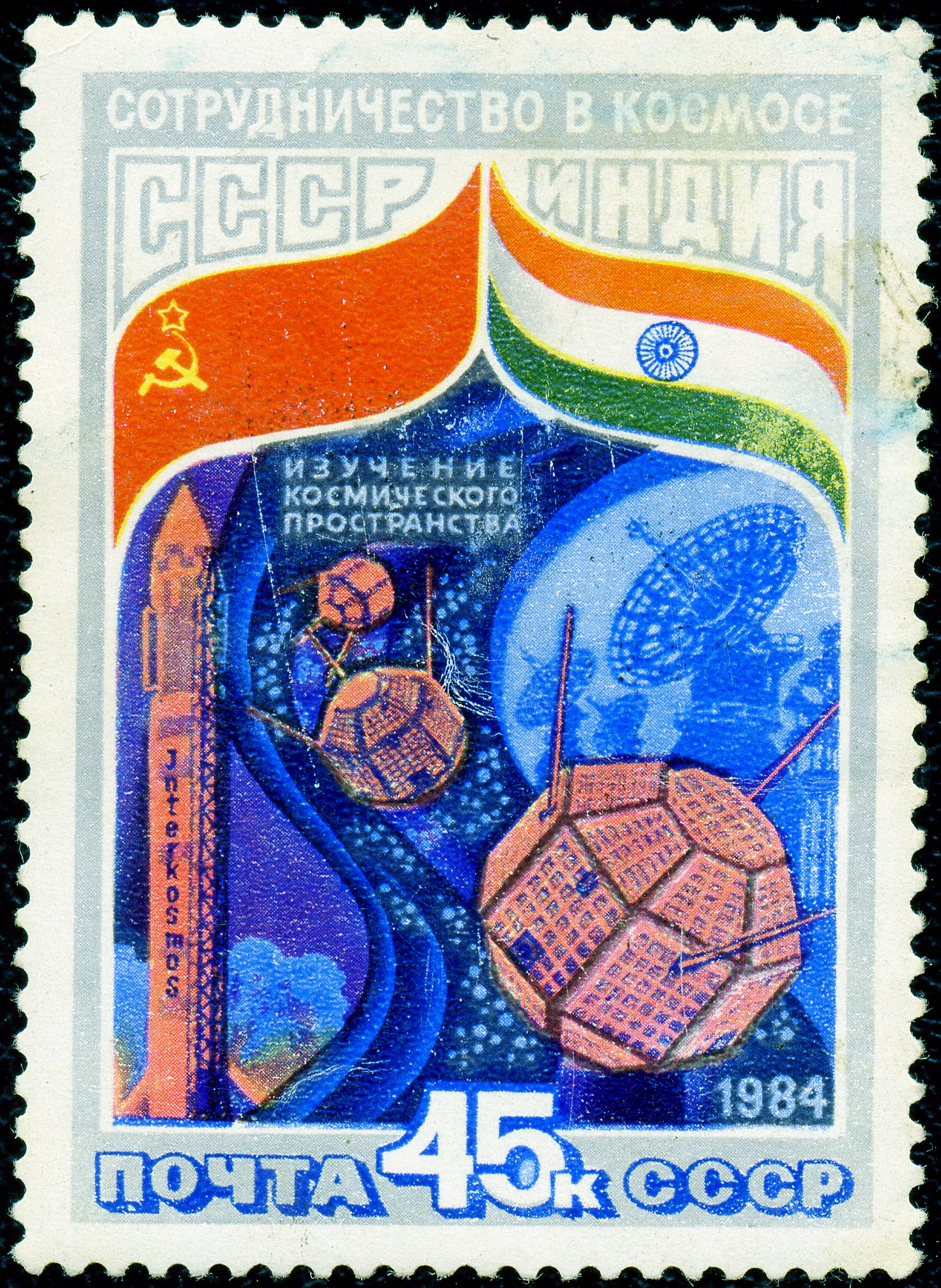
1984 USSR stamp featuring Bhaskara-I, Bhaskara-II and Aryabhata satellites

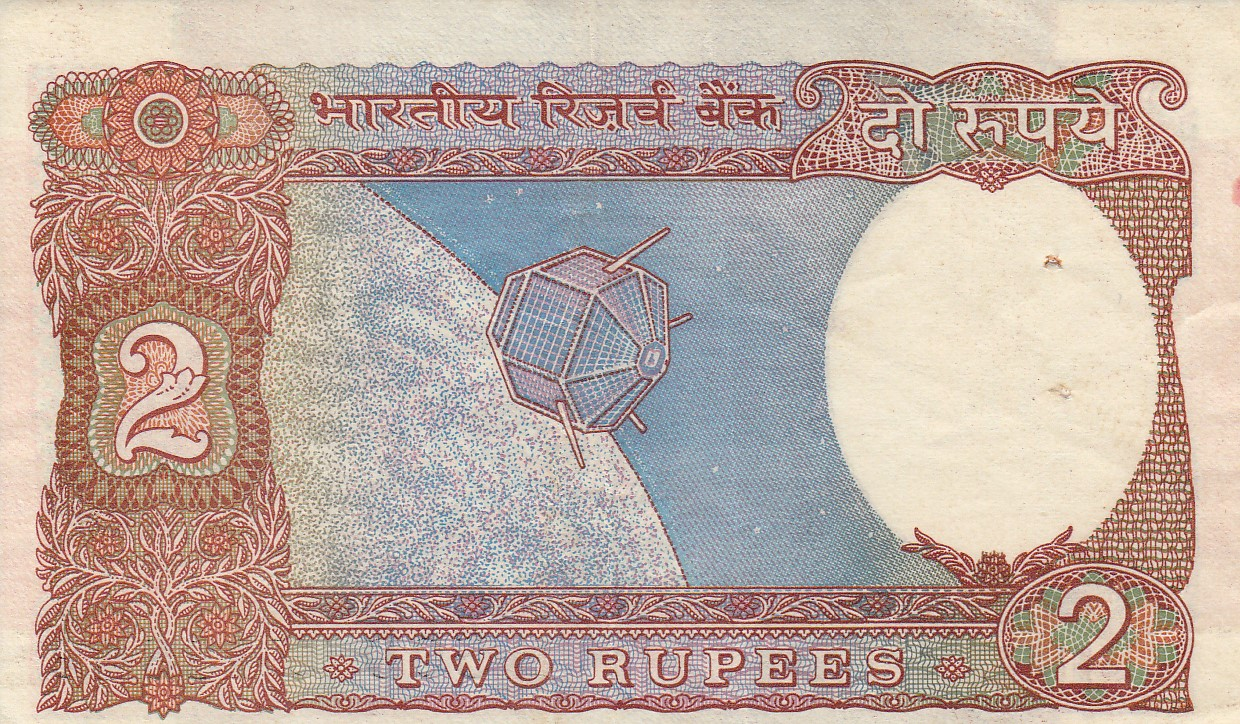
Illustration of Aryabhata spacecraft on ₹2 currency bill

== See also ==
- Rohini RS-1 (Rohini-1B)
- Timeline of artificial satellites and space probes
