= Mata Gujri Mahila Mahavidyalaya =

Coordinates: 23.168355°N 79.932268°E

- Type: Private
- Established: 1994
- Affiliations: Automatons
- Academic affiliations: RDVV
- Principal: Sangeeta Jhamb
- Location: Jabalpur, Madhya Pradesh, India
- Campus: Urban
- Website: matagujricollege.edu.in

Mata Gujri Mahila Mahavidyalaya also known as Mata Gujri College is an autonomous college located in Jabalpur. The college was established in the year 1994 and named after the mother of Guru Gobind Singh, Mata Gujri.

== Affiliations ==
The college is recognized as an autonomous college by the University Grants Commission and is affiliated to Rani Durgavati University.
