= Kusum Nair =

Indian journalist (1919–1993)

Kusum Nair (1919–1993) was an Indian journalist, and writer on agricultural policy from the cultural side. Her work challenged "agricultural fundamentalism". Blossoms in the Dust, a title taken from a 1941 film, was based on a journal from 1958, when she spent a year in Indian villages.

== Early life and education ==
She was born Kusum Prasad in Etah. In 1936 at an age of 16, Kusum Nair was married to Pran Nath Nayyar who was serving in the Indian Navy. In 1941 she graduated from University of Nagpur with a bachelor's degree in philosophy.

Her husband Pran Nath Nayyar had later taken part in the Naval Mutiny of 1946

== Works ==
Her early work dealt with Indian politics, and the Bombay Naval Mutiny of 1946. A Congress Socialist Party member, she was involved in the mutiny's planning.

- The Army of Occupation (1946)
- Japan's Soviet Held Prisoners (1951)
- Blossoms in the Dust: The Human Factor in Indian Development (1961)
- The Lonely Furrow: Farming in the United States, Japan and India (1969)
- Three Bowls of Rice; India and Japan: Century of Effort (1973)
- In Defence of the Irrational Peasant: Indian Agriculture After the Green Revolution (1979)
- Transforming Traditionally: Land and Labour Use in Asia and Africa (1983)
