= Robertson College Jabalpur =

College in Madhya Pradesh

Coordinates: 23.1640°N 79.9682°E

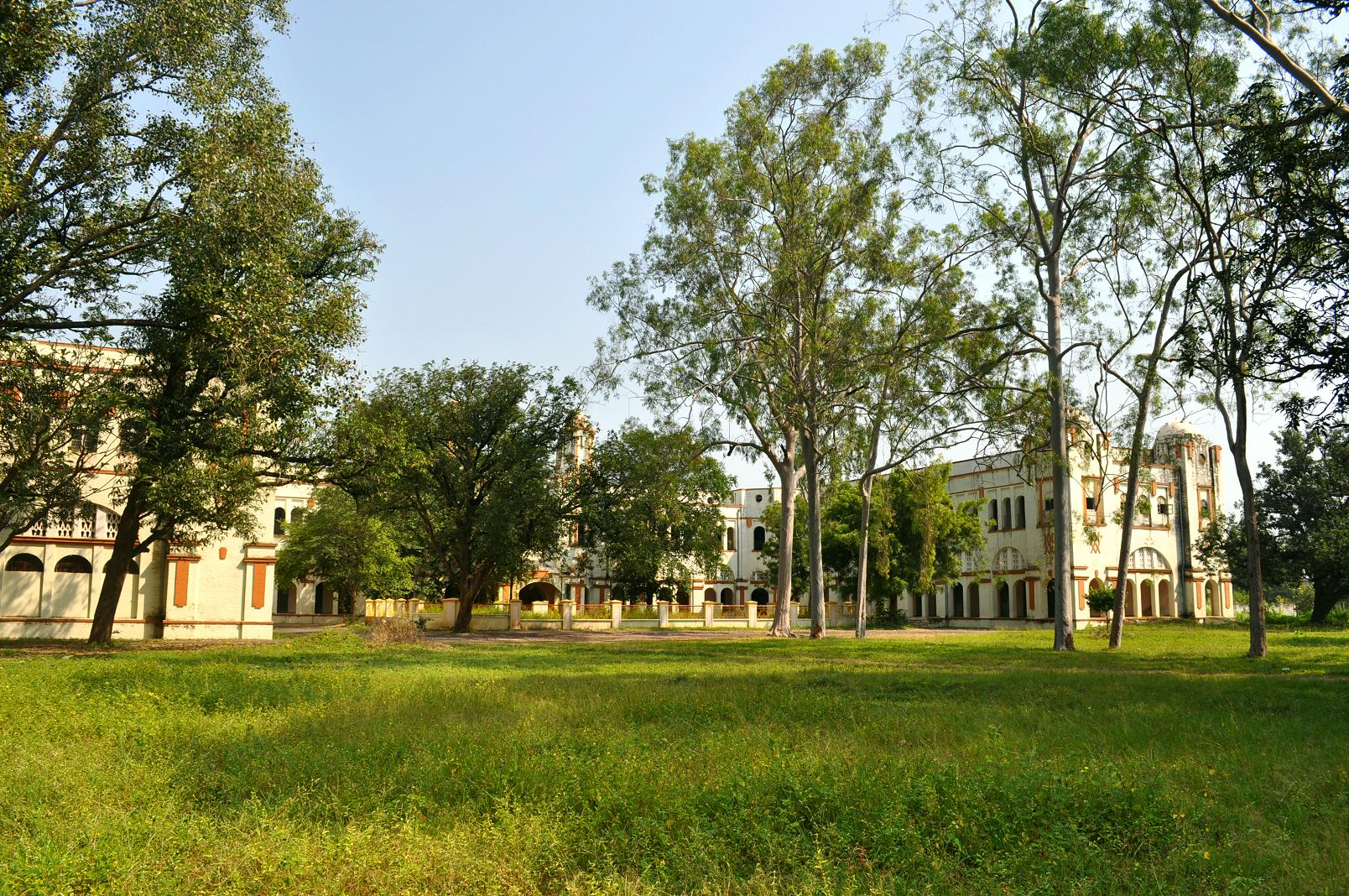
The former building of Robertson College now houses the Civil engineering department of the Jabalpur Engineering College

Robertson College, Jabalpur, (now divided into Government Science College, Jabalpur and Mahakoshal Arts & Commerce College) is considered to be the oldest such institution in Madhya Pradesh.

== History ==
It was established in 1836 as Sagar Govt. School in Sagar, and was upgraded to Sagar Collegiate School in 1860 by starting F.A. (Fine Art, a degree equivalent to 12th grade) classes. The institution was moved to Jabalpur in 1873. It was renamed Robertson College in honor of the then commissioner Mr. Benjamin Robertson in 1916. Many of the students at Robertson College joined Hitkarini Sabha institutions during time of Indian independence struggle, where could they participate in the swaraj movement. It was renamed Mahakoshal Mahavidyalaya in 1947 after independence. The college moved to its present and permanent campus in 1947. The former building of Robertson College now houses the Civil engineering department of the Jabalpur Engineering College

Many distinguished scholars have emerged from the Robertson College and its descendant institutions.
