= National Personal Training Institute =

The National Personal Training Institute is the largest and only licensed clock-hour personal training certification program in the United States that provides students with the education and physical training to become certified personal trainers. It is a 500 hour-long program that can be completed within 6 or 12 months (part-time). The course covers roughly 100 hours of exercise program design, 100 hours of nutrition, 100 hours of anatomy and physiology, and 200 hours of practical experience. A part of each day is spent in a classroom setting learning the academic information and the remainder of each day is spent in a gym setting learning the practical aspects of personal training and actually working out.

The school is approved by the Department of Education in the states that they operate in and the Ministry of Education in Canada. NPTI is also authorized to credential outside of the USA. The school was founded by Gene McIlvaine in April 2001 with four schools; there are currently over 200 hybrid schools nationwide. The headquarters is in Philadelphia, Pennsylvania. Upon graduation students receive a diploma certification in personal training that does not expire, with the title of CPT (Certified Personal Trainer), they are Certified in Basic Nutrition, and they are certified in CPR/AED and First Aid. Successful completion of the class results in a Personal Training Diploma Certification. Ten NPTI school locations now offer federal financial aid. Independent studies show that National Personal Training Institute graduates out earn exam-pass certification holders 39%. NPTI is the only national program that has job placement standards required by state and federal statute.
