= Changa, Anand =

Changa Chandga
- Village
- Location within Gujarat Location within India
- Coordinates: 22.59°N 72.800°E
- Country: India
- State: Gujarat
- District: Anand

Government
  - Sarpanch: sanabhai solanki

Area
  - Total: 14.86 km^{2} (5.74 sq mi)
- Elevation: 35 m (115 ft)

Population (2001)
  - Total: 6,828
  - Density: 459.5/km^{2} (1,190/sq mi)

Languages
  - Official: Gujarati, Hindi
- Time zone: UTC+5:30 (IST)
- PIN: 388421
- Telephone code: 02697
- Vehicle registration: GJ-23

The village of Changa is about 15 kilometres (9.3 mi) west of the tehsil headquarters Petlad and about 20 kilometres (12 mi) northwest of the district headquarters Anand. The village is situated on Nadiad-Khambhat road.

== Agriculture ==
The village is known for its farming and milk production. It mainly farms wheat, non-basmati paddies, poha paddies, bajra, green millent and tobacco. Kalkatti plants are sowed.

== Transport ==
Dewa Railway Station, Dabhau Railway Station are the very nearby railway stations to Changa. Ahmedabad Jn Railway Station is major railway station 57 km near to Changa, Anand on Bombay Delhi line 22 km from Changa and Nadiad.
