= Tiwari =

Tiwari (/tɪˈwɑːri/), from Sanskrit 'tripāṭhin' (learned in three vedas), is a Hindu Brahmin surname found in Uttar Pradesh, Bihar, Madhya Pradesh and Nepal. Alternative spellings include Tiwary and Tewari.

== Notable people ==
=== Independence activists ===
- Chandra Shekhar Azad (born Chandrashekhar Tiwari)
- Adrian Cola Rienzi (born Krishna Deonarine Tiwari), Indian freedom fighter in Trinidad and Tobago

=== Spiritual leaders ===
- Dayananda Saraswati (born Mool Shankar Tiwari), founder of Arya Samaj
- Maya Tiwari, Indo-Guyanese spiritual leader, international speaker and author
- Sahadeo Tiwari, religious scholar

=== Academics ===
- Arun Tiwari, missile scientist, author and professor
- Deepak Tiwari, Hindi editor of Global Investigative Journalism Network and former Vice Chancellor of Makhanalal Chaturvedi National University of Journalism, Bhopal
- S Prakash Tiwari, biotechnologist, geneticist, agriculturalist
- Siddhartha Paul Tiwari, UNESCO Chair on technology and sustainability

=== Civil service ===
- A. N. Tiwari, former Chief Information Commissioner of India
- Sivakant Tiwari, former legal head officer of the Singapore Legal Service

=== Politicians ===
- Captain B P Tiwari, Indian politician and former army officer
- Brij Bhushan Tiwari, Indian politician from the Samajwadi Party
- Ghanshyam Tiwari, Indian politician, education minister in the Government of Rajasthan
- Ghanshyam Tiwari, Indian politician from the Samajwadi party, Bihar
- Hari Shankar Tiwari, politician
- Kamlesh Tiwari, politician
- Kapil Narayan Tiwari, politician
- Kaushal Tiwari, Indian politician
- Manish Tewari, politician, former Minister of State in UPA Government
- Manoj Tiwari, Indian politician, MP from Delhi, BJP State President.
- Narayan Datt Tiwari, Indian politician, former chief minister of Uttar Pradesh and Uttarakhand
- Ram Chandra Tiwari, Nepalese politician
- Ravindranath Tewari, Indian politician, former cabinet minister of Uttar Pradesh
- Sita Tiwaree, Thai politician
- Shivanand Tiwari, Janata Dal (United) politician
- Sriniwas Tiwari, Indian politician, former Madhya Pradesh speaker and minister
- Sushil Kumar 'Indu' Tiwari, MLA from Madhya Pradesh
- Suresh Tiwari, MLA from Uttar Pradesh, Bharatiya Janata Party
- Rajani Tiwari, politician from Uttar Pradesh
- Upendra Tiwari, Indian politician, minister in Uttar Pradesh government

=== Military Officers ===
- Amit Tiwari (air marshal), former Indian Air Force Commanding-in-Chief, Central Air Command.

=== Entertainment ===
- Anand Tiwari, actor and director in Hindi films
- Ankit Tiwari, playback singer and music director
- Bhushan Tiwari, Hindi actor
- Dharmesh Tiwari, Indian film director
- Esha Tewari, Australian singer-songwriter
- Gaurav Tiwari, paranormal investigator, pilot, UFOlogist, TV presenter, and actor
- Girish Tiwari, scriptwriter, director, lyricist, singer, poet, organic culturist, writer, and social activist in Uttarakhand, India
- Indira Tiwari, Indian actress
- Kartik Aaryan Tiwari, Indian actor
- Lalit Mohan Tiwari, Indian film and television actor
- Laxmi Ganesh Tewari, Indian vocalist
- Manish Tiwary, Indian film-maker
- Mukesh Tiwari, actor in Hindi, Tamil and Telugu films
- Nitesh Tiwari, director, script writer, lyricist
- Ridhima Tiwari, television actress
- Shweta Tiwari, Indian film and television actress and producer
- Surbhi Tiwari, Indian television actress
- Vindhya Tiwari, Indian show and film actress

=== Literature ===
- Aditya Tiwari, Indian poet and LGBT rights activist
- Bhim Nidhi Tiwari, Nepalese Bahun poet
- Kapil Muni Tiwary, linguist and scholar
- Siyaram Tiwari (writer), writer and scholar

=== Sports ===
- Manoj Tiwary, Indian cricketer
- Saurabh Tiwary, Indian cricketer

=== Other ===
- Dudhnath Tiwari, Indian sepoy who lived with the Andamanese tribes.
- Ram Puneet Tiwary, Singaporean Indian and acquitted suspect of the Sydney double murders.
