= Singaud =

Village in Jabalpur District, Madhya Pradesh, India

Singaud or Singod
- Village
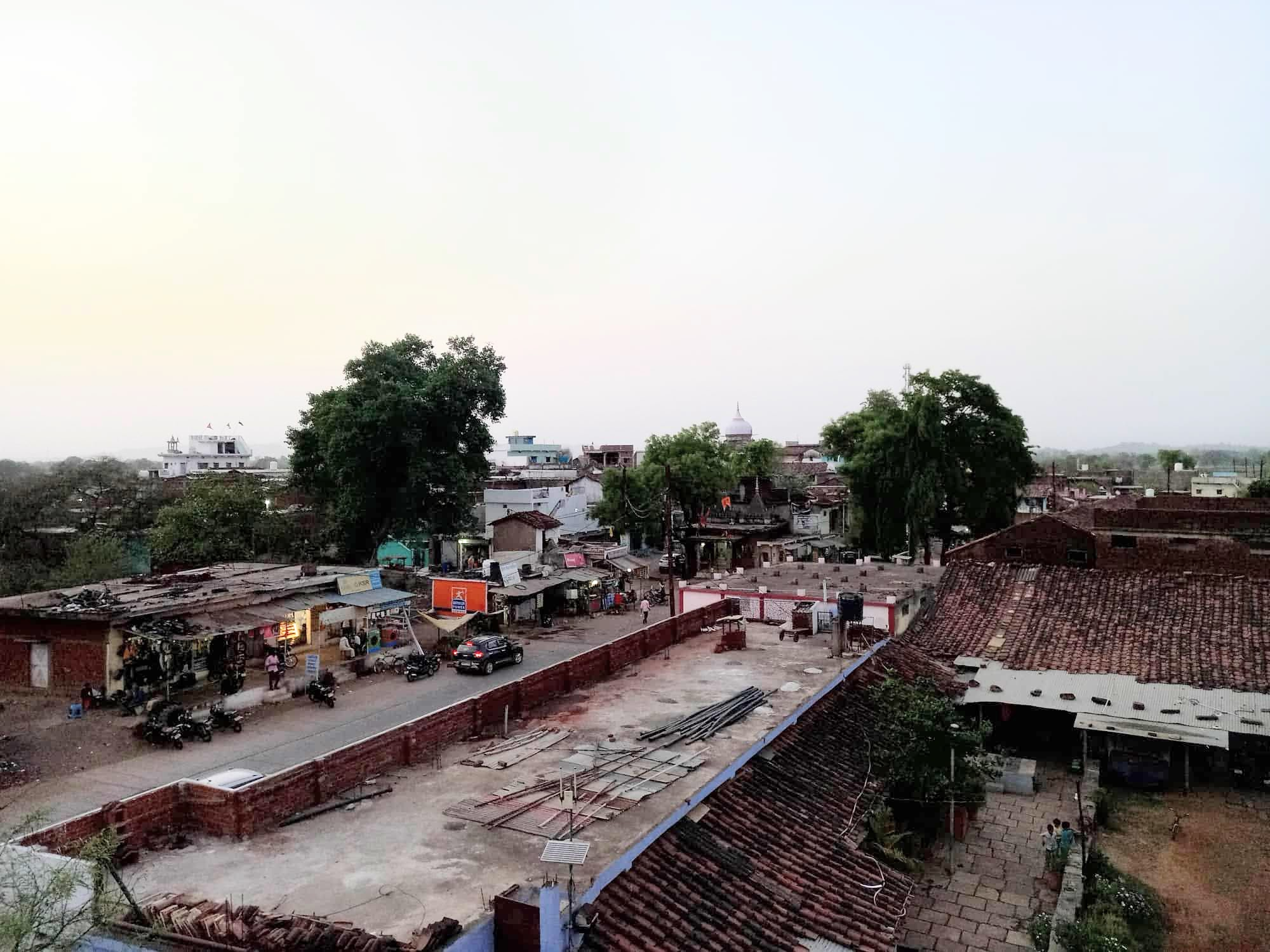

Government
  - Type: Panchayat
  - Body: Panchayat
  - Sarpanch: Maina Choudhary

Singaud, (also known as Singod) is a village located in Pachayat Panagar which is situated in Jabalpur District, Madhya Pradesh, India. In total, the village of Singaud has a geographical area of 492+ hectares. According to the 2011 census, Singaud comprised the village Singod proper as well as the hamlet 'Singaud.' A total of 1,415 people lived in Singod, a total of 696 males and 719 females. Out of the males, 696 were males and 719 were females. There were 1124 people living in Singaud, of which 541 were males and 583 were females. It is estimated that Singaud as a conglomerate had a population of 2539 people, of which 1237 people were males and 1302 people were females.

== Administration ==
As per constitution of India and Panchyati Raaj Act, Singod village is administrated by Sarpanch (Head of Village) who is elected representative of village. The current Sarpanch of village Singaud is Smt. Maina Choudhary. Sarpanch is elected at village, district, and low-intermediate levels (district and sub-district) level.

== Location ==
Singaud is currently a member of the Jabalpur District. It is located 308 kilometers away from the state capital Bhopal, 19 kilometers from the district headquarters of Jabalpur. The PIN code of village Singaud (Singod) is 483220, and its postal head office is Panagar (Jabalpur). Jabalpur Tehsil lies to the south of Singaud, Majhouli Tehsil to the north, Sihora Tehsil to the north, and Patan Tehsil to the west of Panagar. The nearest cities to Singaud are Jabalpur, Sihora, and Umaria.

== History ==
The village of Singaud has history dating back to the time when Jabalpur was chosen as the headquarters for Maratha confederacy in 1781, and it later became the British commission headquarters of Saugor (now Sagar) and Narmada territories. It was constituted a municipality in 1864 which included Panagar and village Singaud. As the District Council Chairman of Jabalpur City in 1956, Captain B P Tiwari from village Singaud initiated the beautification of Jabalpur, Panagar and Singaud.

== Notable People from Village Singaud ==
Dr S Prakash Tiwari, Former Vice Chancellor, Rajasthan University.
