= National Institute of Technology, Silchar =

Public engineering institution in Silchar, Assam, India

- Other name: NITS
- Motto: Tejasvi nāvadhītamastu
- Motto in English: Let our study be enlightening
- Type: Public engineering school
- Established: 1967 (59 years ago)
- Affiliations: Ministry of Education (Government of India)
- Chairperson: Lt. Gen. Himalaya Singh (Retd.)
- Director: Dilip Kumar Baidya
- Academic staff: 213 (2022)
- Students: 4,417 (2022)
- Undergraduates: 3,036 (2022)
- Postgraduates: 670 (2022)
- Doctoral students: 711 (2022)
- Location: Silchar, Assam, India; 24.757432°N 92.78537°E
- Campus: Urban, 625 acres
- Website: www.nits.ac.in

National Institute Of Technology Silchar (NIT Silchar or NITS) is one of the 31 NITs of India and was established in 1967 as a Regional Engineering College in Silchar. In 2002, it was upgraded to the status of National Institute of Technology and was declared as Institute of National Importance under the National Institutes of Technology Act, 2007.

== History ==
The Regional Engineering College at Silchar (Assam) was founded in 1967 as a joint venture between the Government of India and the State Government of Assam to cater to the country's need for manpower in technology. RECs were jointly operated by the central government and the Assam state government.

The college was conferred with autonomy in financial and administrative matters. In 2002, the institution was granted Deemed University status and was renamed as the National Institute of Technology, Silchar. In 2007, through the NIT Bill, the Indian government declared the National Institutes of Technology as Institutes of National Importance.

== Campus ==
The institute is located at 24.75°N, 92.79°E by the Silchar-Hailakandi road, twelve kilometers from the city of Silchar in the state of Assam.

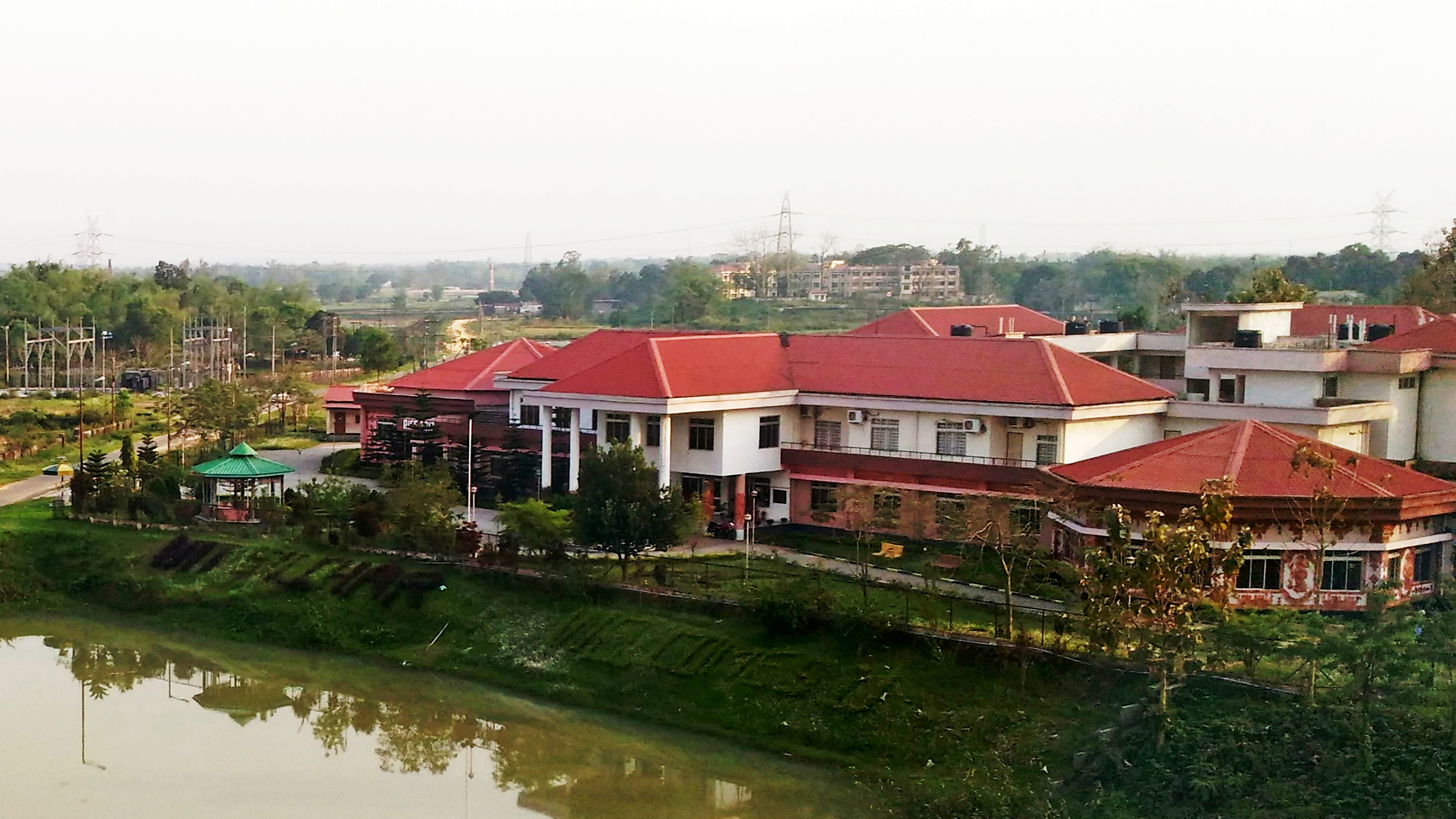
NIT Silchar, Assam

== Organisation and administration ==
=== Governance ===
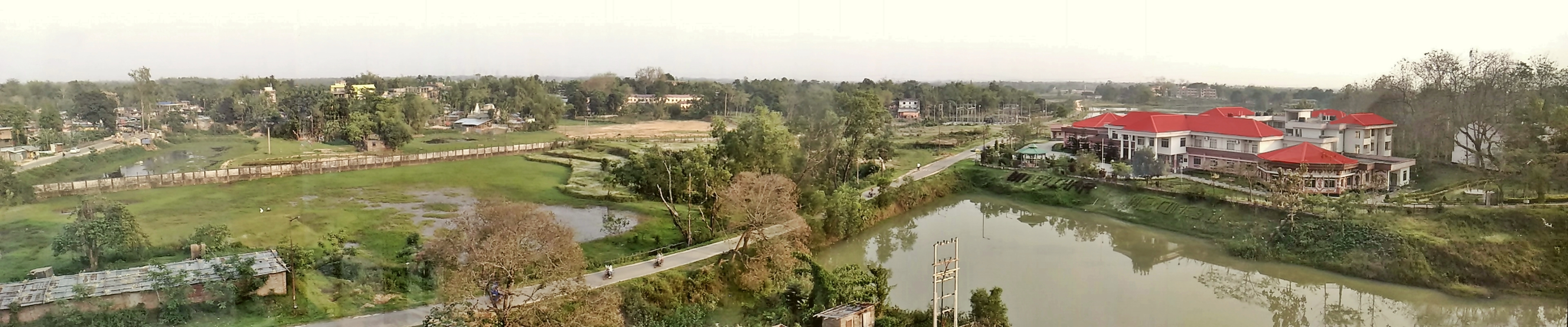
NIT Silchar, Assam

Under the constitution of the National Institutes of Technology Act 2007, the President of India is the visitor to the institute. The authorities of the institute are the board of governors and the Senate. The board is headed by the chairperson, who is appointed by the visitor. The director, who is appointed by the visitor, looks after the day-to-day running of the institute. The board of governors has nominees of the Central Government, the State Government, the NIT Council and the Institute Senate. NIT Silchar is the Mentor Institute of NIT Nagaland. Prof. Dilip Kumar Baidya currently serves as the director of the National Institute of Technology, Silchar. Concurrently, the position of dean of research & consultancy is held by Srimanta Baishya.

== Notable visitors ==
Each year, the institute hosts a series of esteemed guests from diverse fields for a range of events, including invited lectures, convocation ceremonies, and other special engagements. Notable figures from past events include:

A P J Abdul Kalam, Ramesh Pokhriyal, Dharmendra Pradhan, Onir, Anupam Roy, Badal Sircar, Rituparno Ghosh, Ipsita Biswas, Siddhartha Paul Tiwari, Rajat K Baisya, Syed Samsuddin Ahmed.

=== Departments ===
==== Engineering departments ====
- Civil Engineering
- Computer Science and Engineering
- Electronics and Communication Engineering
- Electronics and Instrumentation Engineering
- Electrical Engineering
- Mechanical Engineering

==== Non-engineering departments ====
- Chemistry
- Humanities and Social Sciences
- Management Studies
- Mathematics
- Physics

== Academics ==
NIT Silchar offers undergraduate and graduate programs in Engineering, Science and Humanities with 11 departments. The annual intake for the B.Tech. program is more than 632 (632 as of 2015). The institute also offers different post graduation programs in Engineering, Science and Management. The institute also has a Kendriya Vidyalaya school up to Class XII. Now, the Kendriya Vidyalaya has got its own campus inside the institute. The institute has its own kids school near to computer science building.

=== Undergraduate programs ===
The institute awards B.Tech. degrees in all six disciplines under the engineering departments. Admission to these programs is through the JEE-Main. NITS follows the Reservation Policy declared by the Supreme Court of India, by which 27% of seats are reserved for Other Backward Classes (OBCs), 15% for Scheduled Castes (SCs), and 7.5% for Scheduled Tribes (STs).

The institute also accepts foreign nationals through scholarships awarded by the Government of India, and Non-Resident Indians through an independent scheme known as Direct Admission for Students Abroad (DASA).

In the four-year program of B.Tech, the first year instruction is common across all disciplines, in which students are taught the basic courses in Mathematics, Physics, Chemistry, Professional communication, Basics of Computer Programming, Basic Engineering Drawing, and Basic Mechanical Workshop.

=== Postgraduate programs ===
The institute offers M.Tech. and M.Sc. degrees in various disciplines. The institute also offers MBA degree in Human Resource, Marketing and Finance. Every department offers the Ph.D. program, with the departments of computer science, management studies, humanities and social sciences, chemistry, and physics enrolling approximately 100 Ph.D. students annually.

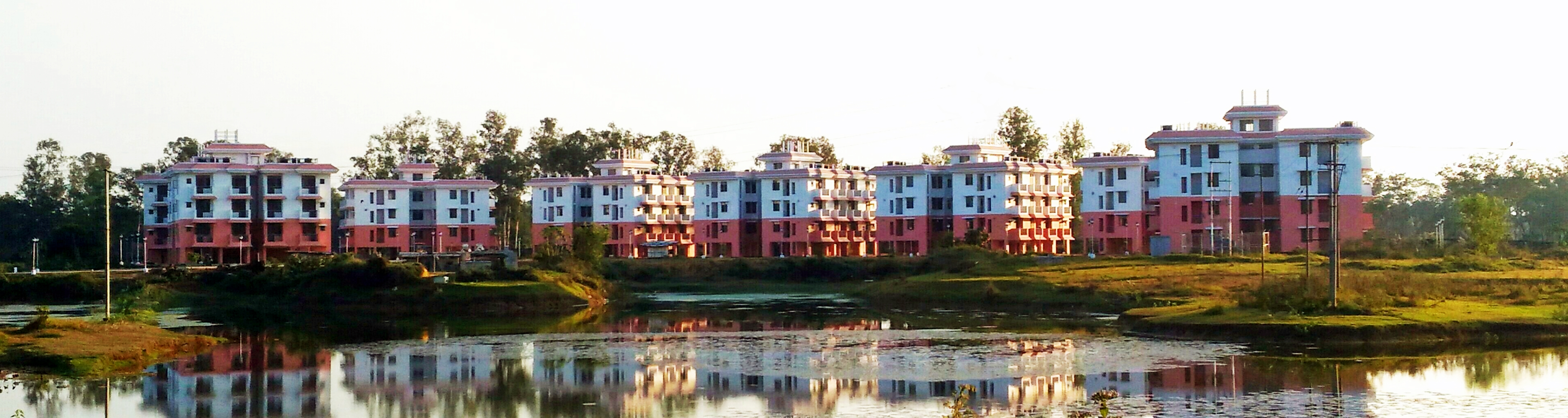
Faculty Quarters at NIT Silchar, Assam

=== Rankings and Reputation ===
University rankings

General – international
- Times (World) (2023): 600-800

General – India
- NIRF (Overall) (2022): 76
- NIRF (Overall) (2023): 83
- NIRF (Overall) (2024): 92

Engineering – India
- NIRF (2022): 38
- NIRF (2023): 40
- NIRF (2024): 40

NIT Silchar was ranked 40th among all engineering colleges in India by the National Institutional Ranking Framework (NIRF) in 2023 and 2024, and is ranked as the 8th best NIT amongst the 31 NITs across the country. The Times Higher Education World University Ranking ranked National Institute of Technology Silchar 600-800 in 2023 rankings.

=== Admissions ===
Students are admitted for the undergraduate courses through the JEE-Main conducted by National Testing Agency (NTA). Admission to the M.Tech and PhD courses are primarily based on scores in the GATE exam, conducted by the IITs. Faculty from other institutes work as research scholars under Quality Improvement Program (QIP).

=== Awards ===
- The ABP News National Education Awards has decided to honour NIT Silchar, with the Outstanding Engineering Institute, East India.
- NIT Silchar has been given the award of best engineering college in eastern India by ASSOCHAM in the National Education Excellence Awards 2014 and 2015.

== Research ==
The institute has received funding in a number of international and domestic research projects with academia and industry in the past few years. Faculty from the institute have received 4 international projects in 2019 under the SPARC program of MHRD with University of Saarland, Germany, Dalhousie University, Canada, Queen's University, Canada and Goldsmiths, University of London, United Kingdom. The institute has also received projects with universities in France and Finland. There are ongoing research projects with SERB, DST, DIT, MNRE, CSIR, BRNS, BARC, UGC, AICTE, MeitY, CPRI, under Govt. of India.

The institute has contributed over 4,000 papers to Scopus and has garnered in excess of 30,000 citations from Scopus on a global scale.

From 2018 to 2022, the institute received international recognition with over 100 patents. The computer science department accounted for 42 of these patents. These innovations contributed to the institute, generating $39 million in revenue.

== Student life ==
=== Technical and Cultural fests ===
The annual technical and management festival of NIT Silchar, Tecnoesis, is held every year in the month of October. Each year, the festival follows a specific theme. It comprises various events like competitions, exhibits, coding rounds, hackathons, robotic events and talks from guest speakers from all over India.

The annual cultural fest of Incandescence, is held every year in the month of February. Various artists, singers, celebs are invited from all over the country. It also comprises the Gliterati, the annual fashion show of NITS and ThunderMarch, a metal concert.

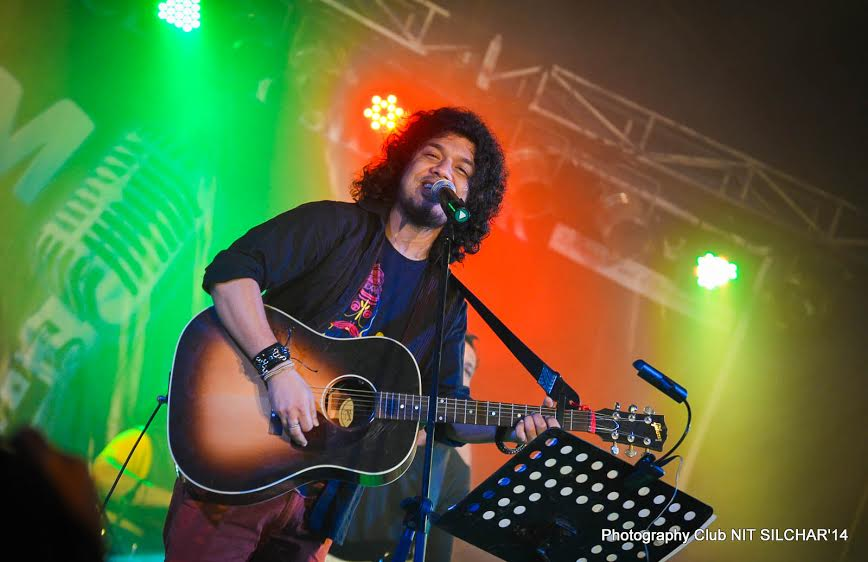
Papon (singer) in 2014 Fest
