= Tripathi =

Tripathi or Tripathy (Sanskrit: त्रिपाठी) is a Hindu Brahmin family name in India and Nepal. Tewari and Tiwari are variants of the name.

== Notable people ==
Notable people with this surname, who may or may not be affiliated to Brahmins, include:

- Amish Tripathi, novelist
- Anupam Tripathi, actor
- Bhakta Tripathy, Indian news editor
- Bharat Tripathi, English cricketer
- Bhumi Tripathi, Nepalese Politician
- Braja Kishore Tripathy, Indian politician
- Chittaranjan Tripathy, Odia director, music director and actor
- D. P. Tripathi, politician from the Nationalist Congress Party
- Admiral Dinesh Kumar Tripathi, current Chief of Indian Navy
- Deepak Tripathi, British historian
- Devi Ranjan Tripathy, Indian politician
- Divyanka Tripathi, model and actress
- Govardhanram Tripathi, Indian Gujarati-language writer
- Geeta Tripathee (born 1972) Nepalese poet, lyricist, essayist, literary critic and scholar
- Hridayesh Tripathi, Nepalese politician
- Kamalapati Tripathi, politician and former Chief Minister of Uttar Pradesh
- Keshari Nath Tripathi, Bharatiya Janata Party politician and Governor of West Bengal
- Krishna Nand Tripathi, Indian politician
- Kumud Tripathi, Bollywood actor
- Kuna Tripathy, Indian actor
- Lavanya Tripathi, model and actress working in Hindi, Telugu and Tamil films
- Leslie Tripathy, Indian actress
- Mansukhram Tripathi, Indian Gujarati-language writer
- Pankaj Tripathi, Indian actor
- Pitobash Tripathy, Indian actor
- Pravat Tripathy, Indian legislator
- Rahul Tripathi, Indian first-class cricketer
- Rakesh Kumar Tripathi, Hindi lyricist, screenwriter and director
- Ramapati Ram Tripathi, Bharatiya Janata Party politician
- Ravi K. Tripathi, Indian playback singer
- S. N. Tripathi, Indian composer
- Sadashiva Tripathy, Indian politician
- Sanjeev Tripathi, former chief of Research and Analysis Wing (RAW)
- Shweta Tripathi, Indian actress
- Sunny Tripathy, Indian-American actor
- Sunil Tripathi (1990–2013), American student who was wrongly accused as the perpetrator of the Boston Marathon bombing
- Surajsrikan Diwakar Mani Tripathi, Singaporean convicted murderer sentenced to life imprisonment and caning
- Suryakant Tripathi 'Nirala', poet, novelist, essayist and story-writer
- S Prakash Tiwari (born 1948), Indian biotechnologist, geneticist, agriculturalist and research director
- Tankadhar Tripathy, Indian politician
- Upendra Tripathy, IAS officer of Karnataka Cadre
- Vani Tripathi, Indian actor and national secretary of the Bharatiya Janata Party

== See also ==
- Trivedi
- Pandey
