= Srimanta =

Srimanta is a given name. Notable people with this name include:

- Srimanta Baishya, an Indian electrical engineering professor
- Srimanta Banerjee (born 1949), an Indian former cricket player
- Srimanta Dutta Chaudhury (1608 – 1640), who founded the royal family of Dinajpur, a city now in Bangladesh
- Srimanta Sankardev (1449 – 1568), an Indian polymath
