= Siyaram Tiwari =

Siyaram Tiwari may refer to:

- Siyaram Tiwari (writer)
- Siyaram Tiwari (musician)
