= Digital Social Work Across Africa and Asia =

2026 written work by Siddhartha Paul Tiwari, Adi Fahrudin, and Fentiny Nugroho

Digital Social Work Across Africa and Asia: A Decolonial Framework for the Future of the Global South is a 2026 non-fiction book by Siddhartha Paul Tiwari, Adi Fahrudin and Fentiny Nugroho. It was published by the publishing division of the University of Indonesia. The book covers the use of digital technology in social work and welfare services in Africa and Asia. The subjects covered in the book include artificial intelligence, digital identity, biometric data and online public services.

== Reception ==
The book received both praise and criticism. Maryann Muganda, writing in The Standard, noted the attention given to social workers and vulnerable communities. She pointed to the sections on shared devices, privacy and digital cash transfers. The review raised two criticisms. The coverage of Africa and Asia was too broad in places. She also doubted that 234 interviews could support conclusions about so many countries. She concluded that the book set out the problems more clearly than the solutions.

Reviewing the book for Mmegi, Tsaone Basimanebotlhe approached it through the relationship between social work and mental health. She responded positively to the concept of communal digital safeguarding, which questions the assumption that privacy belongs to a single person using a private device. She wrote that the book moved across two continents too quickly. She identified its treatment of child social work in Africa as its most serious weakness.

Writing in The Herald, Daniel Chigunwe described the book noting that the book raises vital questions but leaves key gaps. He wrote that it was most convincing in showing that access depends on cost, language, education as well as internet coverage. He described the book as a useful starting point rather than a complete policy guide.

The Indonesian magazine Tempo discussed the book in an article on reliance on foreign technology in Africa and Asia. Puyeipawa Nakashole of The Namibian wrote that the book raised important concerns. She found its examples from practice useful, among them the discussion of households where one phone is shared. She wrote that it asked policymakers to think carefully before moving essential public services entirely online. She found the language often highly academic. Concepts such as data colonialism, she noted, were not always explained in plain terms.

== Synopsis ==
The book treats digital social work as a broad field. It covers online counseling, electronic case management and digital cash transfers. Biometric identification, mobile communication and artificial intelligence are included too.

The authors write about the uses and risks of these systems. Poor internet access is one concern. Other concerns include cost, language barriers and weak data protection. The authors say digital services should suit local conditions. The book uses policy studies and examples from several countries in Africa and Asia.

The book is built from policy analysis, country case studies and interviews with 234 frontline social workers. The book describes practice in settings where infrastructure is unreliable. It also looks at households where one phone or computer is shared among several people.
