= Panagar =

- Town
- Location in Madhya Pradesh, India Panagar (India)
- Coordinates: 23.3°N 79.98°E
- Country: India
- State: Madhya Pradesh
- District: Jabalpur
- Elevation: 377 m (1,237 ft)

Population (2001)
  - Total: 25,143

Languages
  - Official: Hindi
- Time zone: UTC+5:30 (IST)
- ISO 3166 code: IN-MP
- Vehicle registration: MP20

Panagar is a town with municipality in Jabalpur district in the Indian state of Madhya Pradesh.

== Geography ==
Panagar is located at 23.3°N 79.98°E. It has an average elevation of 377 metres (1,236 feet).

== History ==
The town of Panagar has history dating back to the time when Jabalpur was chosen as the headquarters for Maratha confederacy in 1781, and it later became the British commission headquarters of Saugor (now Sagar) and Narmada territories. It was constituted a municipality in 1864 which included Panagar. As the District Council Chairman of Jabalpur City in 1956, Captain B P Tiwari from village Singaud initiated the beautification of Panagar.

== Demographics ==
As of 2001 India census, Panagar had a population of 25,143. Males constitute 52% of the population and females 48%. Panagar has an average literacy rate of 68%, higher than the national average of 59.5%: male literacy is 75%, and female literacy is 60%. In Panagar, 14% of the population is under 6 years of age.

== Transport ==
The nearest airport is Jabalpur.

== Notable People from Panagar ==
- Sushil Kumar 'Indu' Tiwari, MLA from Panagar assembly constituency of Madhya Pradesh
- Dr. S Prakash Tiwari, Former Vice-Chancellor of Swami Keshwanand Rajasthan Agricultural University, Bikaner, and Former Director of National Academy of Agricultural Research Management (NAARM), Hyderabad.
