= Ravishankar Shukla Stadium =

Sports venue in Jabalpur, India

Ravi Shankar Shukla Stadium
- Interactive map of Ravi Shankar Shukla Stadium
- Location: Wright Town, Jabalpur, Madhya Pradesh
- Coordinates: 23.165°N 79.927°E
- Owner: Jabalpur Municipal Corporation
- Operator: Jabalpur Municipal Corporation
- Capacity: 15,000

Construction
- Opened: 1956

Tenants
- Madhya Pradesh cricket team Madhya Pradesh football team Pride Sports FC (formerly)

Ravi Shankar Shukla Stadium is the main sports venue in Jabalpur, Madhya Pradesh. It is used for several sports, like association football and cricket. The stadium has hosted two first-class cricket matches in 1976 and 1981 between Madhya Pradesh and Rajasthan and between Madhya Pradesh and Uttar Pradesh.

== History ==
As originally planned, the stadium was to be built in Ranital. However, given the time and expense involved, the then District Council Chairman of Jabalpur City in 1956, Captain B P Tiwari decided to build a small stadium in Wright Town grounds. Due to the death of Ravishankar Shukla in 1956, Captain B P Tiwari, Shukla's close aide, decided to name the stadium and adjacent sports facilities after him. The Ravishankar Shukla stadium was established as a result of this.

== First-class ==
List of First-class matches played at Ravi Shankar Shukla Stadium

Team (A)	Team (B)	Winner	Margin	Year
Madhya Pradesh	Rajasthan	Madhya Pradesh	By 6 Wickets	1976
Madhya Pradesh	Uttar Pradesh		Drawn	1981

== See also ==
- Stadium picture
- cricketarchive
- espncricinfo
