= Adi Fahrudin =

Indonesian academic (born 1966)

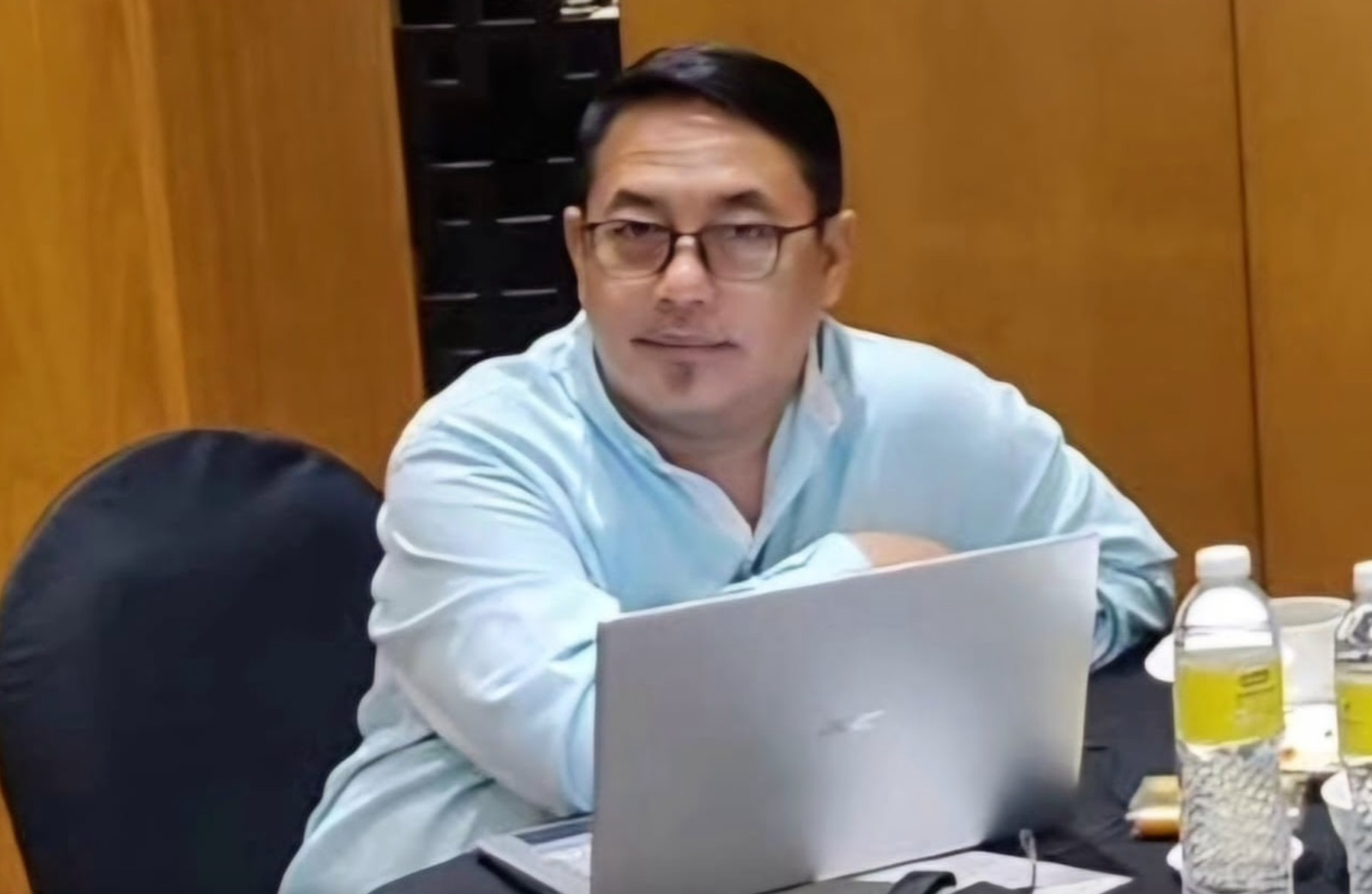
- Born: Palembang
- Education: Universiti Sains Malaysia
- Known for: Editor-in-chief Asian Social Work Journal (ASWJ)
- Awards: Satyalancana Karya Satya award
- Scientific career
- Fields: Social Work, Social Sciences, Psychology, Rehabilitation

Adi Fahrudin (born January 12, 1966) is an Indonesian academic. He is dean of the Universitas Bhayangkara Jakarta Raya and a professor of social work under the Ministry of Education, Culture, Research, and Technology of Indonesia.

Fahrudin is editor-in-chief of the Asian Social Work Journal (ASWJ). He was the first professor in social welfare in Indonesia. He co-authored Digital Social Work Across Africa and Asia published by University of Indonesia.

== Academic career ==
Adi Fahrudin currently serves as the director of the Institute for Research, Community Service, and Publication (appointed in June 2022) and as dean of the Faculty of Psychology at Universitas Bhayangkara Jakarta Raya (since August 2023). From 2012 to 2022, was professor in social work at the University of Muhammadiyah Jakarta. He was professor at the Bandung Polytechnic of Social Welfare from 1993 to 2011.

Fahrudin has been a visiting professor at Japan College of Social Work, Tokyo, Japan; Universiti Malaysia Sabah; Universiti Sultan Zainal Abidin; and Universiti Sains Malaysia.

== Awards and honours ==
- Board member, Asian and Pacific Association for Social Work Education.
- Editor-in-chief of the Asian Social Work Journal (ASWJ).
- Editor-in-chief of International Journal of Psychology and Health Science (IJPHS).
- Editor of the Journal of Behavioral & Social Sciences.
- The Satyalancana Karya Satya award as an honor for Indonesian Civil Servants for dedication.

== Books ==
- Tiwari, Siddhartha Paul; Fahrudin, Dr Adi (2024-11-15). Evolving School Dynamics and Emerging Technologies in Education:Critical Success Factors. SciFormat Publishing Inc., 2734 17 Avenue Southwest Calgary, Alberta, Canada, T3E 0A7. ISBN 978-1-0690482-0-2.
- Tiwari, Siddhartha Paul; Fahrudin, Dr Adi (2024-12-25). Strategies and Impacts of Generative Artificial Intelligence Integration into Indonesian Mobile and E-Commerce Organizations. SciFormat Publishing Inc., 2734 17 Avenue Southwest Calgary, Alberta, Canada, T3E 0A7. ISBN 9781069048226.
- "Programming of social work in Indonesia By Adi Fahrudin". Taylor & Francis. doi:10.4324/9780429465222-12.
- Fahrudin, Adi (2020). Perubahan sosial ekonomi di masa pandemi Covid-19 (in Indonesian). Refika. ISBN 978-623-7060-75-8.
- Fahrudin, Adi (2023). Kelompok rentan: isu sosial terkini (in Indonesian). Nuansa Cendekia. ISBN 978-623-335-228-4.
- Fahrudin, Adi (2020). Penyalahgunaan narkotika & intervensi psikososial (in Malay). Penerbit IDEA Press. ISBN 978-623-7085-62-1.

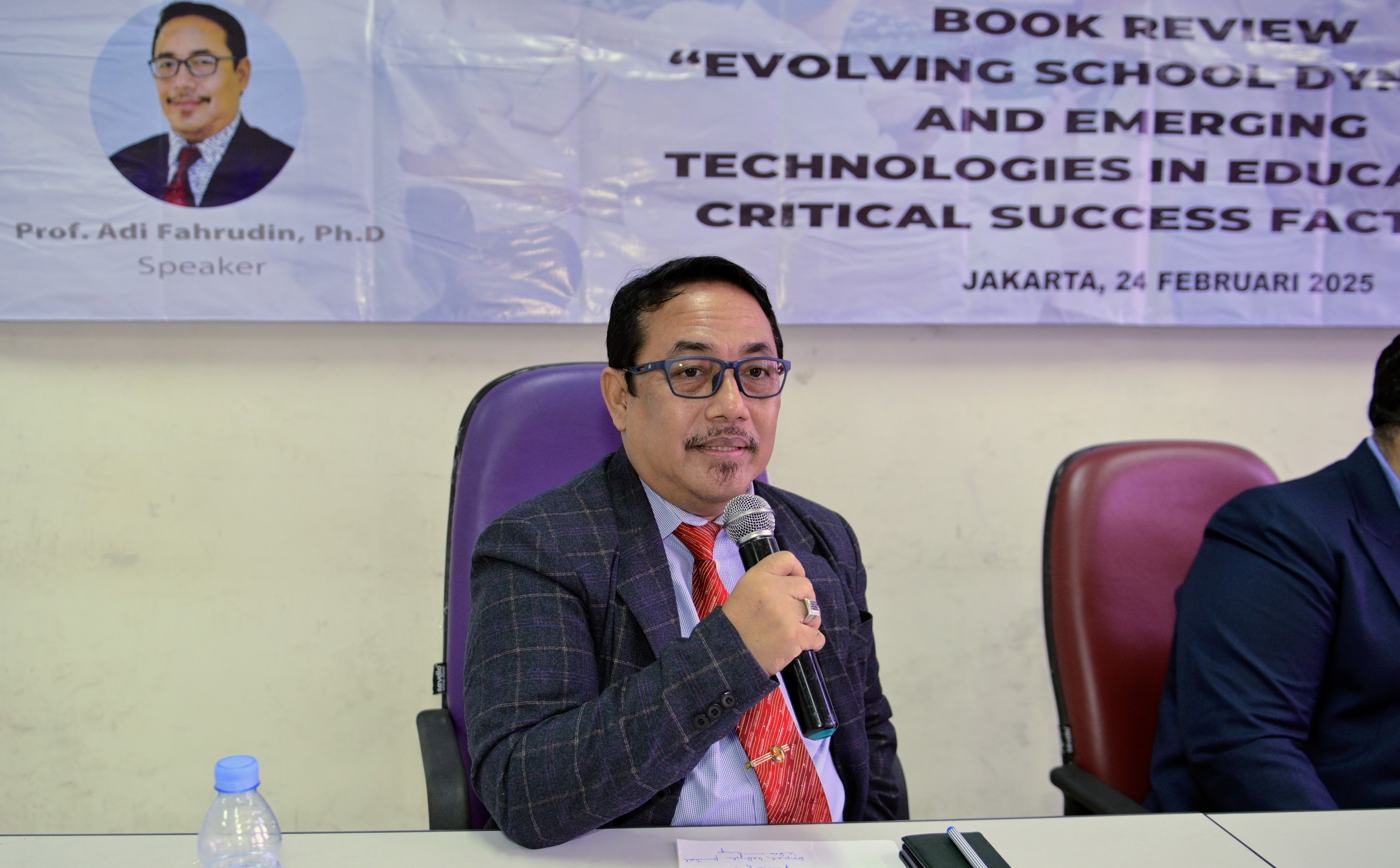
Dr Adi Fahrudin at an international seminar

== Selected publications ==
- Fahrudin, A., 2013. Social welfare and social work in Indonesia. Social welfare in East Asia and the Pacific, pp. 136–57. Columbia University Press
- Albert, Wanda Kiyah George; Fahrudin, Adi; Lindong, Steward; Yusuf, Husmiati (2024-02-20), "Improving quality of life among advanced cancer patients and family caregivers", Social (In)equality, Community Well-being and Quality of Life, Edward Elgar Publishing, pp. 273–283, ISBN 978-1-0353-1245-0
- Fahrudin, Adi (June 2012). "Preparing Social Work Students for Working with Disaster Survivors". Asian Social Work and Policy Review. 6 (2): 86–94. doi:10.1111/j.1753-1411.2012.00064.x. ISSN 1753-1403.
- Fahrudin, Adi (October 2012). "Psychosocial Reaction and Trauma After a Natural Disaster: The Role of Coping Behavior". Asian Social Work and Policy Review. 6 (3): 192–202. doi:10.1111/j.1753-1411.2012.00070.x. ISSN 1753-1403.
- Fahrudin, Adi; Yusuf, Husmiati (2020), "Social Work Education in Contemporary Indonesia: Issues, Challenges, and Concerns", in S.M., Sajid; Baikady, Rajendra; Sheng-Li, Cheng; Sakaguchi, Haruhiko (eds.), The Palgrave Handbook of Global Social Work Education, Cham: Springer International Publishing, pp. 21–34, doi:10.1007/978-3-030-39966-5_2, ISBN 978-3-030-39966-5
