= Panagar Assembly constituency =

Constituency of the Madhya Pradesh legislative assembly in India

Coordinates: 23.29°N 79.99°E

Panagar
- Constituency No. 101 for the Madhya Pradesh Legislative Assembly

Constituency details
- Country: India
- Region: Central India
- State: Madhya Pradesh
- District: Jabalpur
- Lok Sabha constituency: Jabalpur
- Established: 1972
- Reservation: None

Member of Legislative Assembly
- 16th Madhya Pradesh Legislative Assembly
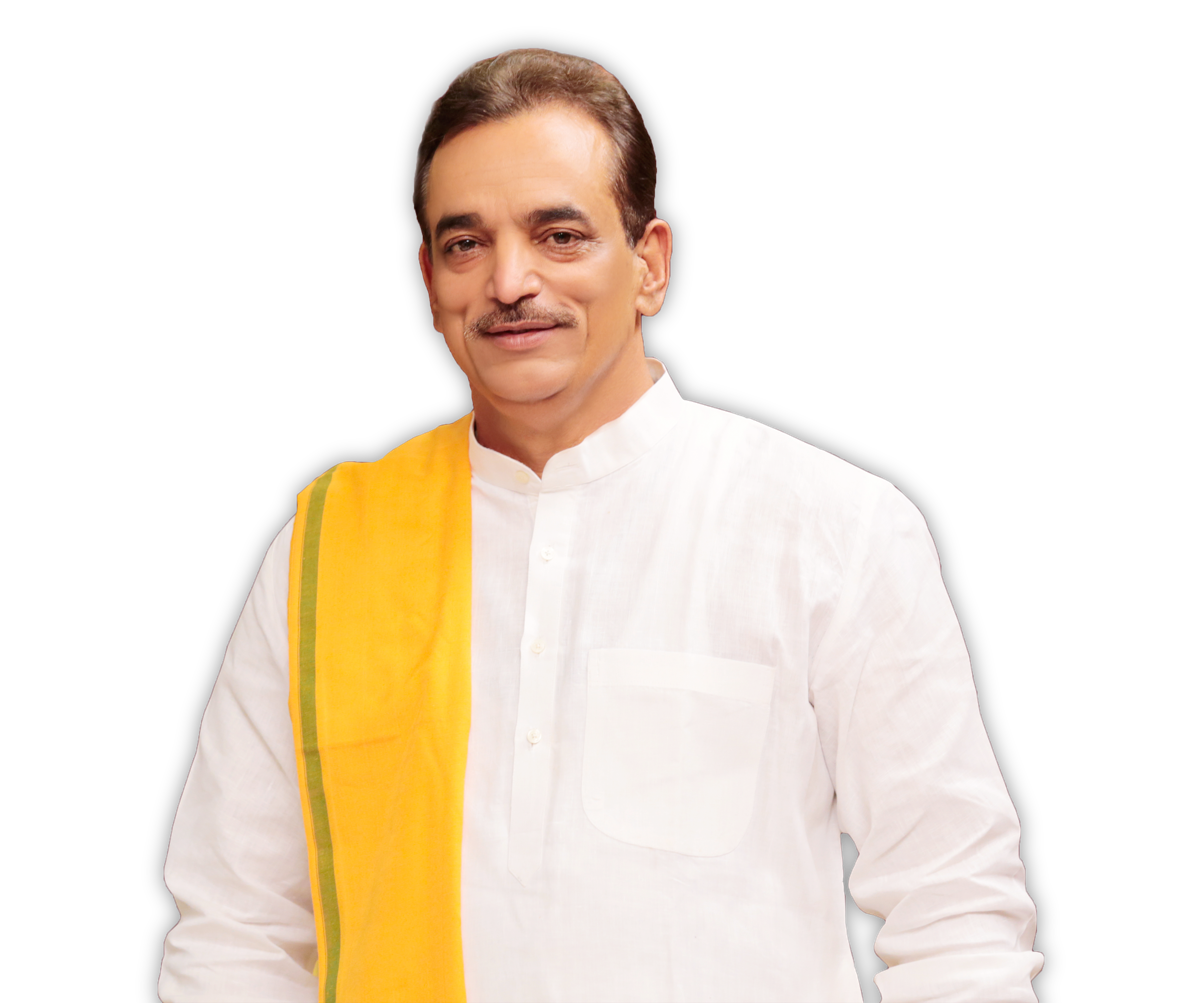
- Incumbent Sushil Kumar Tiwari
- Party: Bharatiya Janata Party
- Elected year: 2023
- Preceded by: Narendra Tripathi

Panagar is one of the 230 Vidhan Sabha (Legislative Assembly) constituencies of Madhya Pradesh state in central India. It is part of Jabalpur district and Jabalpur Lok Sabha constituency. As of 2023, it is represented by Sushil Kumar Tiwari of the Bharatiya Janata Party.

== Members of the Legislative Assembly ==
Year	Member	Party
1957	Parmanand Mohanlal	Indian National Congress
1962	Parmanand Mohanlal	Indian National Congress
1967	Parmanand Mohanlal	Indian National Congress
1972	Girwar Singh Patel	Indian National Congress
1977	D. P. Pathak	Indian National Congress
1980	Bhishm Shah Judeo	Indian National Congress (Indira)
1985	Bhishm Shah Judeo	Indian National Congress
1990	Moti Lal Kashyap	Bharatiya Janata Party
1993	Moti Lal Kashyap	Bharatiya Janata Party
1998	Kaushalya Gontia	Indian National Congress
2003	Moti Lal Kashyap	Bharatiya Janata Party
2008	Narendra Tripathi	Bharatiya Janata Party
2013	Sushil Kumar Tiwari	Bharatiya Janata Party
2018	Sushil Kumar Tiwari	Bharatiya Janata Party
2023	Sushil Kumar Tiwari	Bharatiya Janata Party

== Election results ==
=== 2023 ===
2023 Madhya Pradesh Legislative Assembly election: Panagar
Party	Candidate	Votes	%	±%
BJP	Sushil Kumar Tiwari	119,071	57.33	+11.19
INC	Rajesh Patel	78,530	37.81	+15.57
BSP	Asha Gotiya	3,812	1.84	−2.11
NOTA	None of the above	1,812	0.87	−0.11
Majority		40,541	19.52	−3.32
Turnout		207,707	77.55	+2.19
BJP hold		Swing		

=== 2018 ===
2018 Madhya Pradesh Legislative Assembly election: Panagar
Party	Candidate	Votes	%	±%
BJP	Sushil Kumar Tiwari	84,302	46.14	
Independent	Bharat Singh Yadav	42,569	23.3	
INC	Sammati Saini	40,629	22.24	
BSP	Jawahar Ahirwar	7,209	3.95	
NOTA	None of the above	1,785	0.98	
Majority		41,733	22.84	
Turnout		182,706	75.36	
BJP hold		Swing		

== See also ==
- Panagar
