= Siddhartha Paul Tiwari =

Academic

Siddhartha Paul Tiwari FRAS FRAI
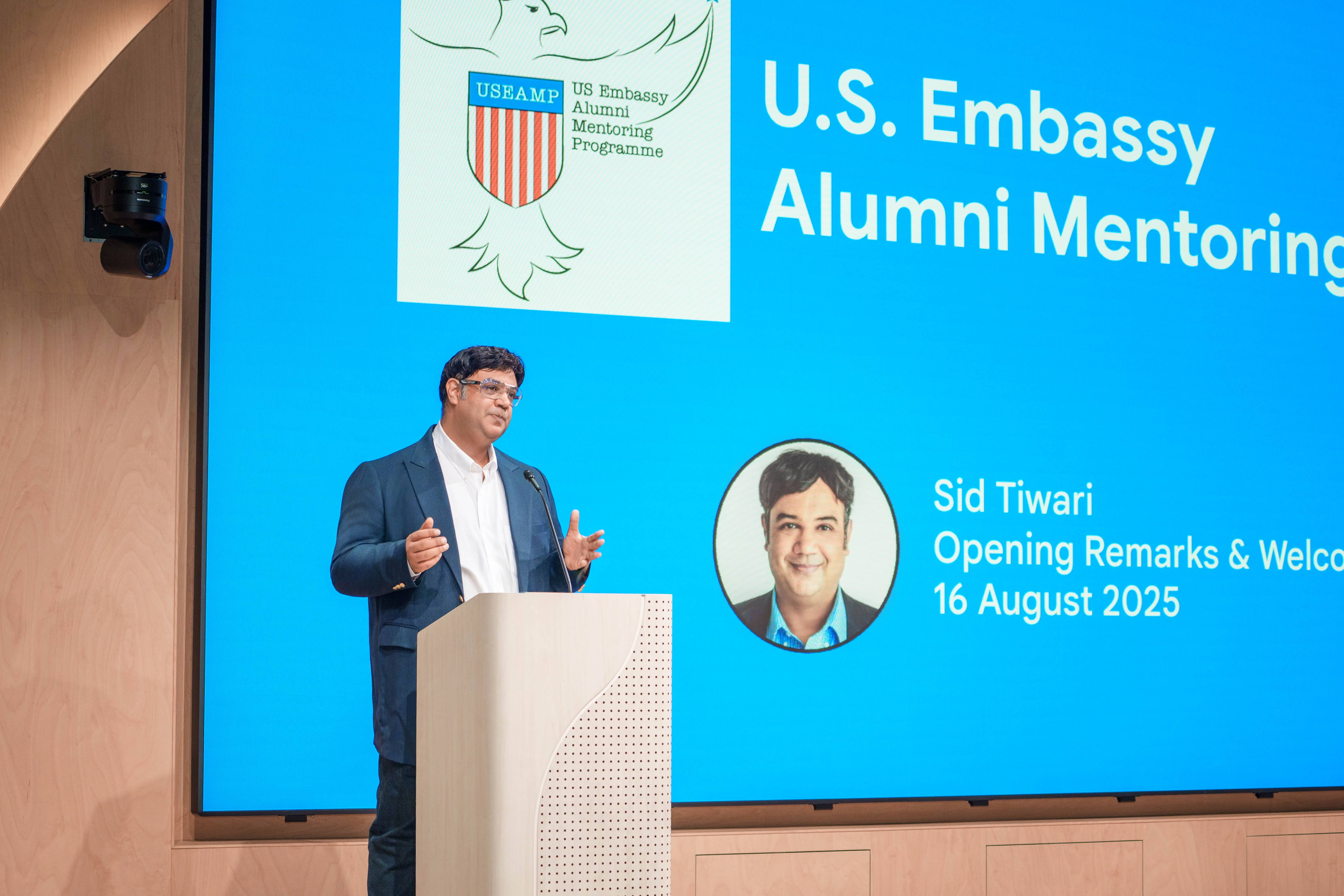
- Tiwari in 2025 at U.S. Embassy Singapore Alumni Mentoring Program
- Born: 13 June 1979 (age 47); Jabalpur
- Education: DAVV Indore, IIT Delhi
- Occupations: Technologist; Academic; Researcher
- Years active: 2002–present
- Organization: Google
- Known for: Research and education in emerging technologies, ICTs, and mobile technologies
- Notable work: Understanding Technology in the Context of National Development: Critical Reflections
- Board member of: Joint Management Entrance Test (JMET)
- Children: 1
- Parent: S Prakash Tiwari
- Relatives: Captain B P Tiwari (Grandfather)

Siddhartha Paul Tiwari FRAS (born 1979) is an academic, technologist and researcher. Currently, he works with Google Asia Pacific, Singapore. Prior to this, he led Google's global learning and development efforts from Tokyo. He has worked work in the areas of e-governance, mobile technologies, digital intervention strategies, and information and communication technologies (ICTs). Among his publications are several books, including Understanding Technology in the Context of National Development: Critical Reflections, co-authored with former Prime Minister of Ukraine Yuriy Yekhanurov, as well as essays and speeches. His lectures and writings focus on digital media and technology.

== Career ==
During his career, Tiwari has been actively involved in the development of new higher educational curriculums, user trust, safety, and privacy. Between 2005 and 2006, he served as a member of the committee of All India Council for Technical Education (AICTE). Tiwari has served as an expert advisor to the National Research Foundation (South Africa), a research funding agency aligning national priorities with the country’s research agenda.

Tiwari is widely quoted as saying: "India’s happy future lies in combining talent and technology."

He is an elected fellow of the Royal Anthropological Institute of Great Britain and Ireland.

Previously, Tiwari has held pro bono faculty positions at Indian Institute of Management Indore, Indian Institute of Technology Roorkee, Atal Bihari Vajpayee Indian Institute of Information Technology and Management, Indian Institute of Technology Delhi, and Tokyo Institute of Technology. He was also part of National Assessment and Accreditation Council's curriculum reform committee and was involved in setting the curriculum for postgraduate engineering and technology programs in India.

As of 2023, Tiwari works for Google Asia.

== Creation of new curricula and courses ==
To adapt to the rapidly changing teaching environment and to incorporate new technologies into the university curriculum, Tiwari has developed the following course credits and curriculum at a postgraduate level.

- A course on technology and its impact on society was developed and launched by Tiwari as part of the civil service training offered to Indian Administrative Service trainee officers at Lal Bahadur Shastri National Academy of Administration.
- His research resulted in the development and launch of a postgraduate credit course on "Digital Marketing" at the Indian Institute of Management Indore.
- A course on 'Technology Management and the Asian Regulatory Framework' has been developed and launched by him at Indian Institute of Technology Delhi.

== Personal life ==
Tiwari was born in Jabalpur but raised in Shimla, Junagadh, Delhi and Indore. He is the grandson of B. P. Tiwari and the son of S Prakash Tiwari.

== Bibliography (Books Authored) ==
- Tiwari, Siddhartha Paul; Kostenko, Oleksii; Yekhanurov, Yuriy (2025). Understanding Technology in the Context of National Development: Critical Reflections. SciFormat Publishing Inc. 2734 17 Avenue Southwest, Calgary, Alberta, Canada, T3E0A7. ISBN 978-1-0690482-3-3.
- Tiwari, Siddhartha Paul; Fahrudin, Adi (2024). Evolving School Dynamics and Emerging Technologies in Education:Critical Success Factors. SciFormat Publishing Inc., 2734 17 Avenue Southwest Calgary, Alberta, Canada, T3E 0A7. ISBN 9781069048202.
- Tiwari, Siddhartha Paul; Fahrudin, Adi (2024). Strategies and Impacts of Generative Artificial Intelligence Integration into Indonesian Mobile and E-Commerce Organizations. SciFormat Publishing Inc., 2734 17 Avenue Southwest Calgary, Alberta, Canada, T3E 0A7. ISBN 9781069048226.
- Tiwari, Siddhartha Paul (2022). The Impact of New Technologies on Society: A Blueprint for the Future. Scholarly Publisher RS Global Sp. z O.O. ISBN 9788396508553.

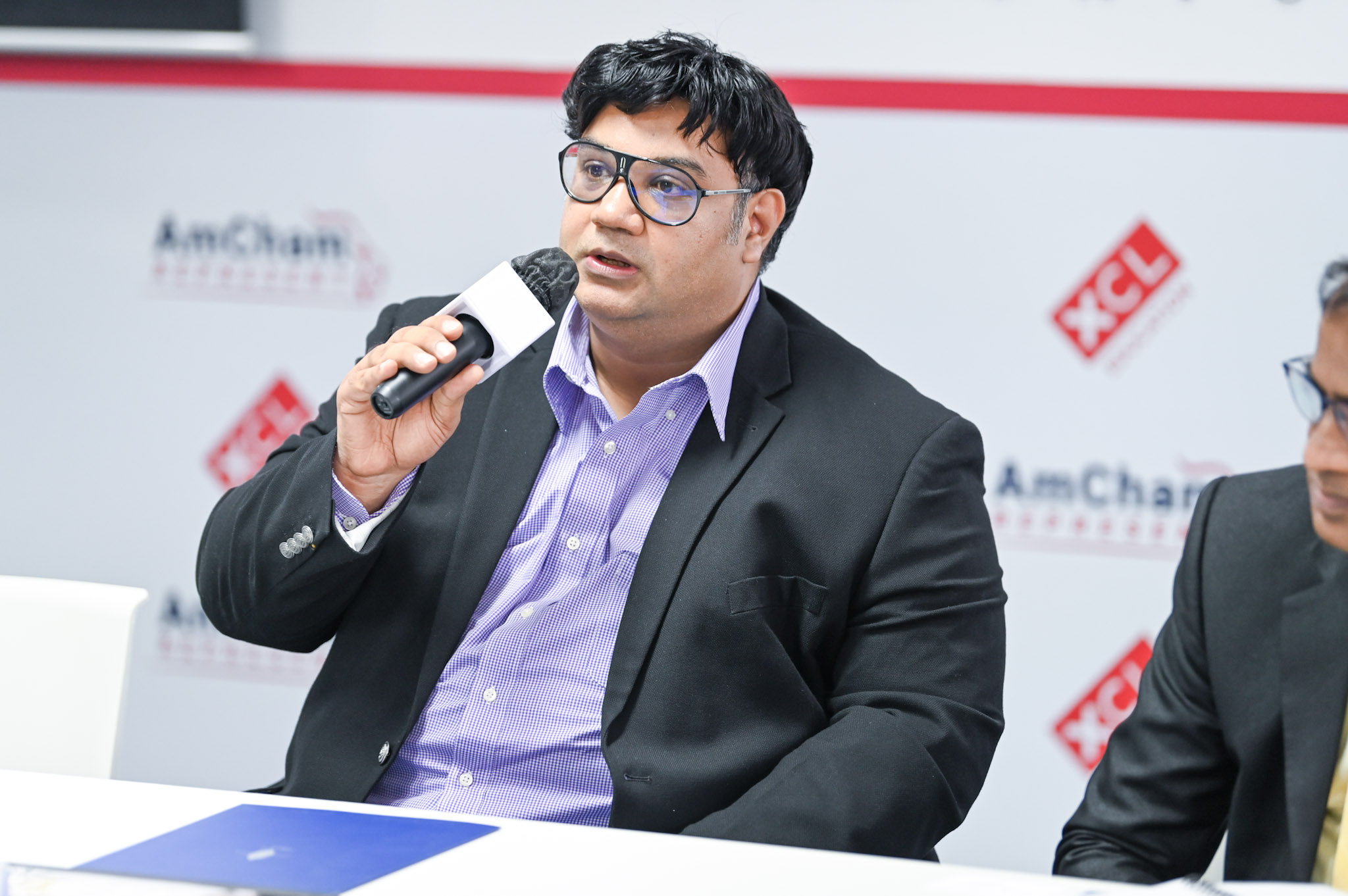
Siddhartha Paul Tiwari at American Chamber of Commerce Singapore (2024)

== Awards and recognition ==
- Elected fellow of the Royal Anthropological Institute of Great Britain and Ireland.
- Elected fellow of the Royal Asiatic Society of Great Britain and Ireland.
- Distinguished Professor and Mentor, Southeast Asia Interdisciplinary Development Institute.
- Editorial Board Member Contemporary Issues in Artificial Intelligence.

== Selected publications ==
- Tiwari, Siddhartha Paul (5 September 2008). "Information and communication technology initiatives for knowledge sharing in agriculture". The Indian Journal of Agricultural Sciences. 78 (9). ISSN 2394-3319.
- Baisya, Rajat K.; Tiwari, Siddhartha Paul (2008). "E-governance Challenges and Strategies for Better-managed Projects". Emerging Technologies in E-Government. Computer Society of India: 203–208.
- Tiwari, Siddhartha Paul; Grace, Lindsay; Pradhan, Harsh (2026). "AI as a Catalyst for Change in Creative Workflows". Proceedings of the 59th Hawaii International Conference on System Sciences. University of Hawaiʻi at Mānoa.
- Tiwari, Siddhartha Paul; Tiwari, SP (2018). "Is export-oriented and currency dynamics-based Indian soybean revolution environment-friendly?" (PDF). Current Science. 114 (8). Indian Academy of Sciences: 1604–1605. doi:10.18520/cs/v114/i08/1604-1605.
- Tiwari, Siddhartha Paul (March 2022). "Re-emergence of Asia in the New Industrial Era". Technium Social Sciences Journal. 29: 471–480. Bibcode:2022TSSJ...29..471T. doi:10.47577/tssj.v29i1.6103.
- Tiwari, Siddhartha Paul (2022). "Knowledge Management Strategies and Emerging Technologies - an Overview of the Underpinning Concepts". International Journal of Innovative Technologies in Economy. arXiv:2205.01100. doi:10.31435/rsglobal_ijite/30032022/7791. S2CID 248505784.
- Tiwari, Siddhartha Paul; Grace, Lindsay D. (2024). "Observations and Reflections on the Gaming Landscape in South East Asia". Games: Research and Practice. 1 (4) 27. Association for Computing Machinery: 1–4. doi:10.1145/3632286. S2CID 265679437.
