= Rajat K. Baisya =

Indian management professor

Rajat K Baisya
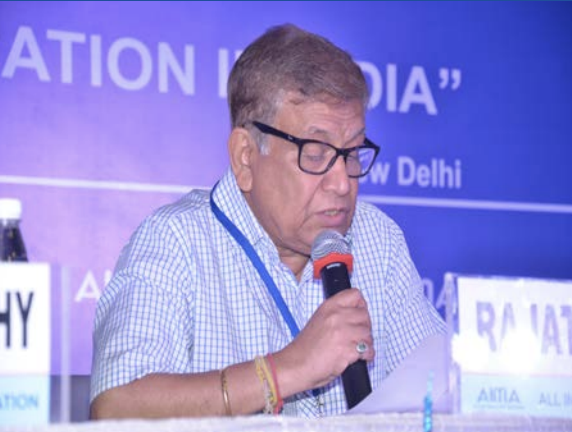
- Baisya at India International Centre (IIC)
- Born: Sylhet
- Known for: Makers of Jadavpur: A Technological Perspective, Gairdner International Award
- Awards: Best Professor Award from Bloomberg
- Scientific career
- Fields: Management Science, Project Management, Operations Research
- Institutions: Indian Institute of Technology, Delhi
- Notable students: Siddhartha Paul Tiwari

Rajat K Baisya is an Indian management professor, author, and researcher. He was formerly Professor & Dean of Dept of Management Education, IIT Delhi. He was awarded Gardner International Award for the year 1974. He was also awarded Dr J.S.Pruthi Award for the year 2001 for significant contribution to the food industry.

== Career ==
=== Academic ===
Rajat Kanti Baisya obtained his B. Sc. (Honours in chemistry) degree from Calcutta University and thereafter got his B.Tech., M.Tech, and Ph.D degrees in Food Technology and Biochemical Engineering from Jadavpur University. He served in the same institute as CSIR, UGC and Ministry of Defence research scholar working on various projects in the areas of Biochemical and Food Engineering as well as Chemical Engineering.

Baisya served as Dean of Dept of Management Education, IIT Delhi. He has written over 350 research articles and twelve books, besides supervising ten PhD thesis in the areas of supply chain management, marketing management, strategic management and international business. Prior to becoming Dean at IIT Delhi, Baisya was Professor at the Department of Food, Dairy and Agriculture Engineering at Indian Institute of Technology, Kharagpur.

=== Corporate ===
He was President and CEO of the Emami Group of Companies from 1988 to 1994. For many years prior to that, he was the Global Senior Vice President, Business Development at Reckitt Benckiser Ltd. In addition, he has held senior management positions at companies such as Escorts Ltd, United Breweries Group, Unilever Group, and Parle-Bisleri Group.

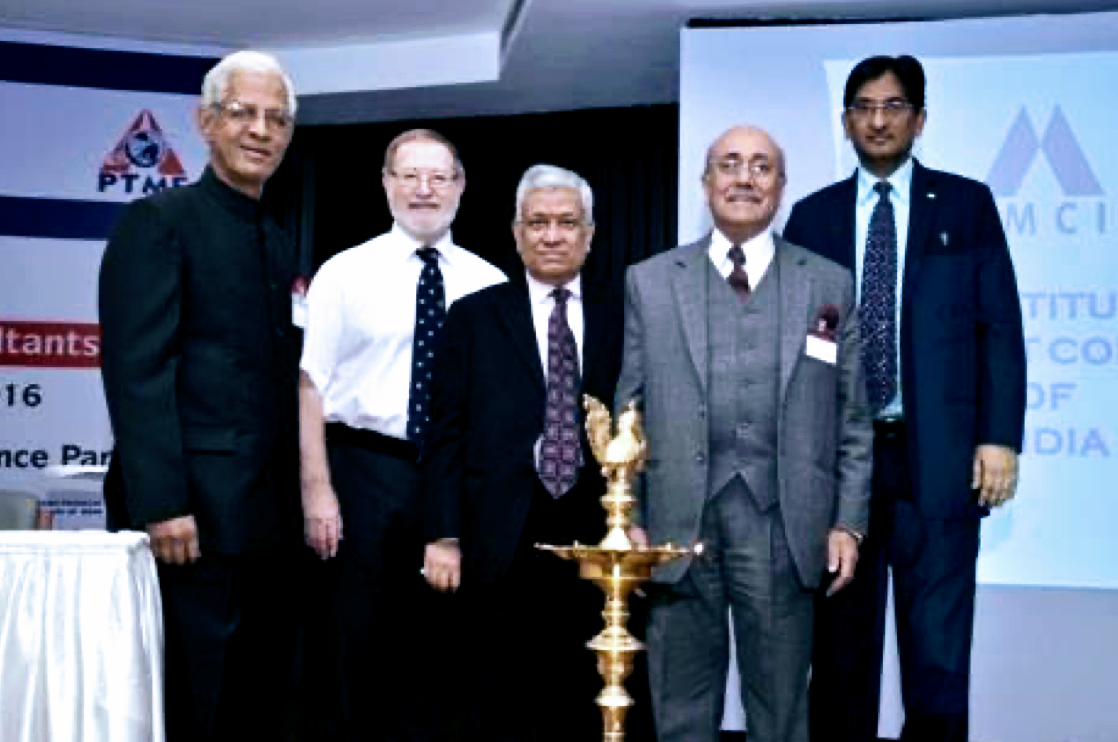
Baisya inaugurating an international conference.

== Awards and honours ==
- Awarded Gairdner International Award for the year 1974.
- Awarded Dr J.S.Pruthi Award for the year 2001 for significant contribution to the food industry.
- Awarded National Institute of Management & Technology Commendation Award for the year 2002 for corporate Excellence & significant contribution in the areas of corporate turnaround strategies and change management.
- Dr Baisya is a Fellow of Institute of Engineers and Indian Institute of Chemical Engineers and Institute of Management Consultants. He also served as the Chairman of Institute of Management Consultants of India Delhi.
- Research Management Board of International Project Management Association (IPMA)
- Best Professor of Marketing Management Award from Bloomberg UTV

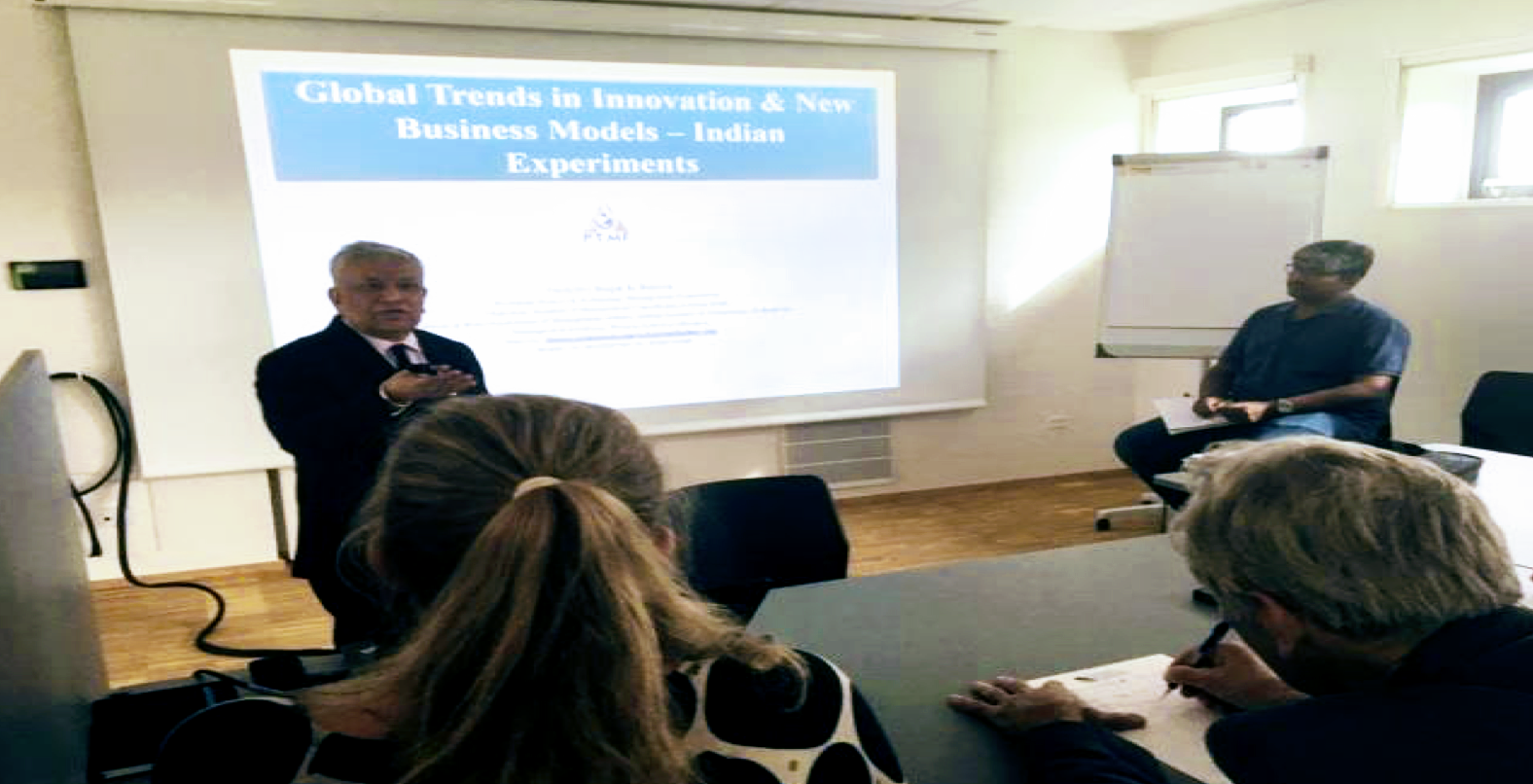
Prof Baisya as visiting professor at University of Southern Denmark.

- Elected fellow, World Academy of Productivity Science (WAPS), Canda
- Elected academic fellow, of the International Council of Management Consulting Institutes (ICMCI)
- Vice President, Asia Pacific Federation of Project Management

== Books authored ==
- Makers of Jadavpur: A Technological Perspective, Jadavpur University Press, 2021, ISBN 9789383660759
- Integrated Supply Chain and Logistics Management, Published by SAGE Publishing, 2020, ISBN 9789353286651
- Branding in a Competitive Marketplace, Published by SAGE Publishing, 2013, ISBN 9788132110590
- Winning Strategies for Business, Published by SAGE Publishing, 2014, ISBN 9788132104421
- Aesthetics in Marketing, Published by SAGE Publishing, 2008, ISBN 9780761935957
- Managing Start-Ups for Success: Entrepreneurship in Difficult Times, Published by Taylor & Francis, 2021, ISBN 9781000396720
- Supply Chain and Logistics Management, Published by Taylor and Francis, 2024.
- Product Portfolio Management for Performance, Published by Taylor and Francis, 2025.

== Selected publications ==
- Charan, Parikshit, Ravi Shankar, and Rajat K. Baisya. "Analysis of interactions among the variables of supply chain performance measurement system implementation." Business Process Management Journal (2008).
- Chakrabarti, Somnath, and Rajat K. Baisya. "The influences of consumer innovativeness and consumer evaluation attributes in the purchase of fashionable ethnic wear in India." International Journal of Consumer Studies 33.6 (2009): 706-714.
- Baisya, Rajat K., and R. Sarkar. "Customer satisfaction in the service sector: a case study of the airline industry." Journal of Advances in Management Research (2004).
- Baisya, Rajat K., and Siddhartha Paul Tiwari. "E-governance Challenges and Strategies for Better-managed Projects." Emerging Technologies in E-Government (2008): 203-208.
- Baisya, Rajat Kanti, and Brane Semolic. "Evolving corporate education: Relevance of management education." Evolving corporate education strategies for developing countries: The role of universities. IGI Global, 2013. 39-55.
