= B. P. Tiwari =

Indian military officer and politician (1911–2008)

Captain B P Tiwari
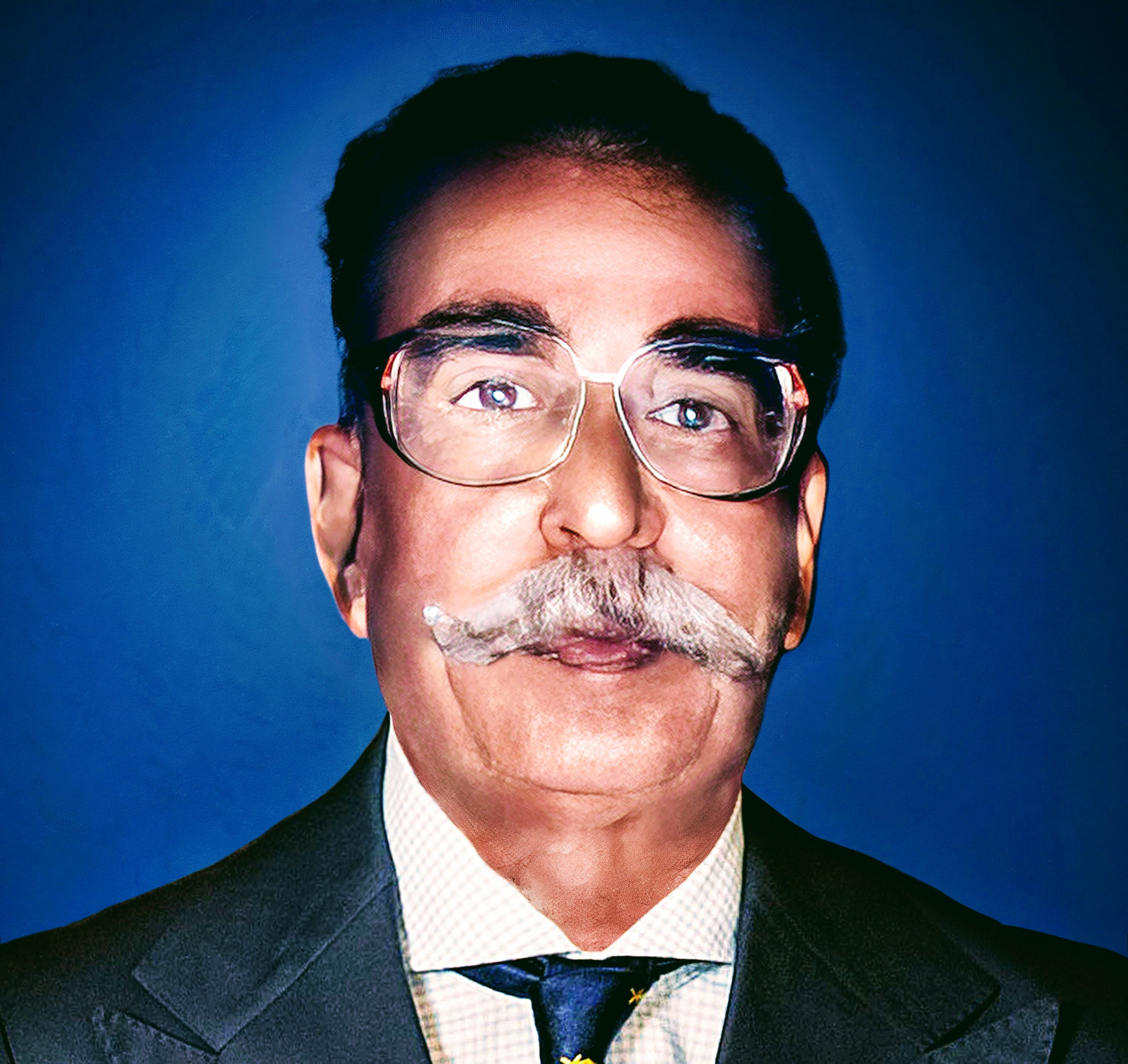
- Captain B P Tiwari as Chairman of the Jabalpur District Development Council in 1986

Personal details
- Born: 15 June 1911 Singaud, Jabalpur district, India
- Died: 2008 (aged 96–97) Jabalpur
- Party: Indian National Congress
- Education: Master of Arts
- Alma mater: Robertson College Jabalpur
- Occupation: Politician, statesman, military officer
- Military career
- Allegiance: British India; India
- Branch: British Indian Army; Indian Army
- Rank: Captain
- Conflicts: Burma (1945)

Captain B P Tiwari (15 June 1911 – 2008) was an Indian military officer, politician and statesman. He was Zamindar from Panagar Jabalpur district in the Central Provinces of India.

During his service in the British India Army, Tiwari served as both a lieutenant and later as captain and in 1947 leading to India's independence, he left the army to join the Indian National Congress. In 1956, for the first time since he had joined the Indian National Congress, he was appointed Chairman of the Jabalpur District Development Council by the party.

During the 1960s and 1970s Captain Tiwari served as a member of the Hitkarini Sabha in Jabalpur, and contributed significantly to the growth of educational institutions in the city.

== Early life and education ==
Tiwari was born and raised as a Zamindar in Singaud, Jabalpur district. His formal education was completed at Robertson College Jabalpur, where he earned his Masters degree in Arts.

== Career ==
Tiwari was commissioned a lieutenant for the Indian Army in 1930. He spent a year attached to the East Yorkshire Regiment based in India before being sent to the British Indian Army and posted to the 16th Light Cavalry in 1932.

During World War II as a captain, Tiwari served in Burma in 1945 with the 16th Light Cavalry. After 1947, he left the army to join the Indian National Congress and served as Chairman of the Jabalpur District Development Council in 1956. During his tenure as chair of the Jabalpur District Development Council, he was responsible for the development of educational projects and beautification of the towns and countryside of Singaud, Panagar, and the city of Jabalpur. He was also responsible for the construction of the Ravi Shankar Shukla Stadium in Jabalpur city and a sports facility to cater to local sports. Due to the death of Ravishankar Shukla in 1956, Captain B P Tiwari, Shukla's close aide, decided to name the stadium and adjacent sports facilities after him. The Ravishankar Shukla Stadium was established as a result of this.

Tiwari was Chairman of the District Planning Committee in 1965. A member of the Indian National Congress committee in the 1960s, Tiwari is widely regarded as the "Kingmaker" in Indian politics during this time period. He also served as a member of District Rural Development Agency (DRDA).

== See also ==
- Hitkarini Sabha
- Ravishankar Shukla Stadium
- Singaud
- Panagar
