= Sushil Kumar Tiwari =

Indian politician (born 1959)

Indu Tiwari
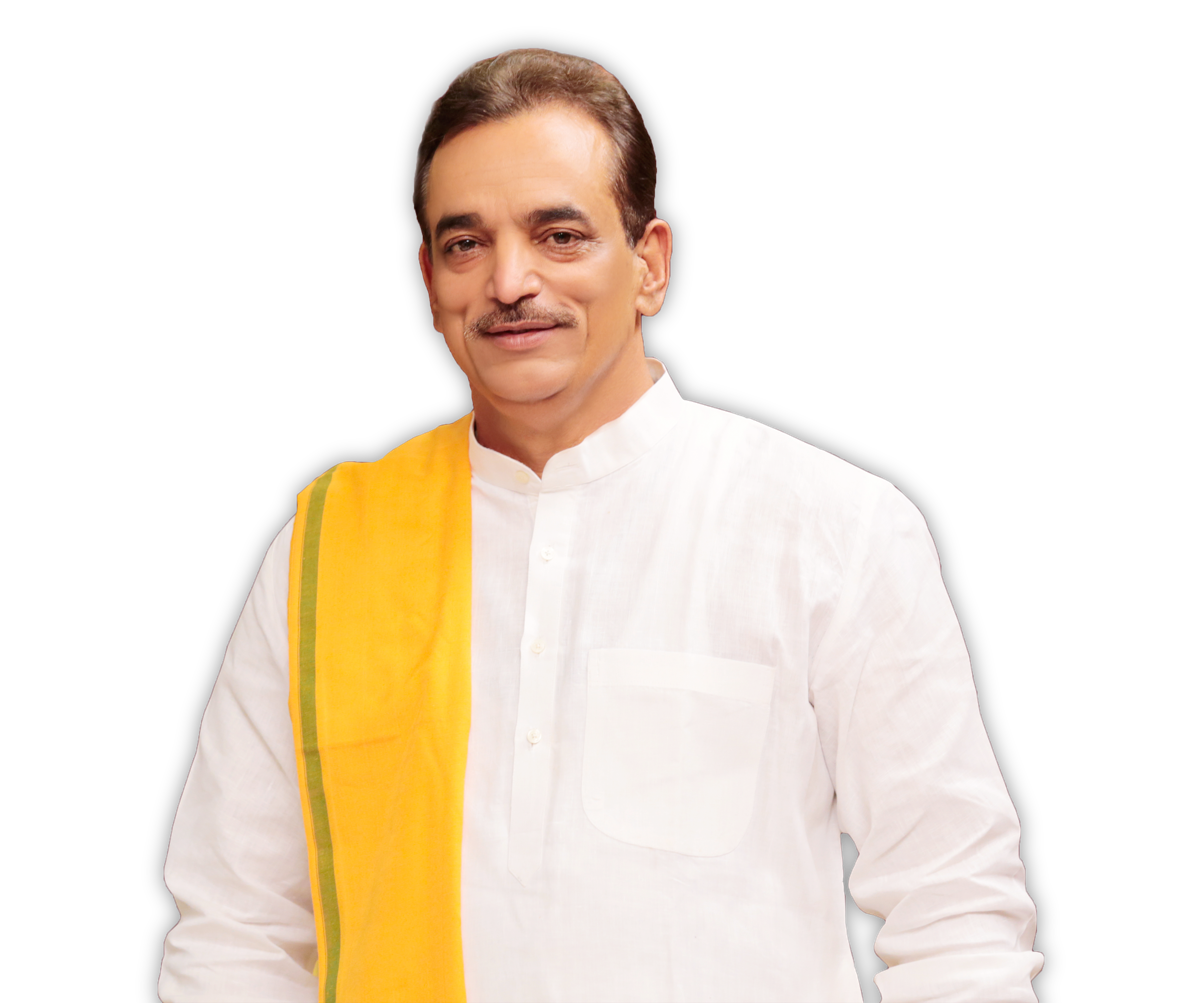

Member of the Legislative Assembly
- Constituency: Panagar
- Incumbent
- Assumed office 2013,2018

Personal details
- Party: Bharatiya Janata Party
- Education: Mahatma Gandhi Chitrakoot Gramodya University
- Website: https://www.indutiwari.in/

Sushil Kumar Tiwari, known as Indu Bhaiya, (born 30 June 1959) is an Indian politician from Madhya Pradesh. He is a three time MLA from Panagar Assembly constituency in Jabalpur district. He represents Bharatiya Janata Party.

== Early life and education ==
Tiwari is from Jabalpur. His late father Chhote Lal Tiwari was a farmer. He did his schooling at Govindganj Higher Secondary School. Later, he completed B.Com in 2013 at a college affiliated with Mahatma Gandhi Chitrakoot Gramodaya University. He married Maya Tiwari. They have two sons, Aman Tiwari and Harsh Tiwari.

== Career ==
Tiwari joined politics during college and played an active role in student politics with the Akhil Bharatiya Vidyarthi Parishad from 1978 to 1985. In 1985, he joined the Bharatiya Janata Party and was active in developmental works in his area from 2013. He won the 2013 Madhya Pradesh Legislative Assembly election from Panagar Assembly constituency representing Bharatiya Janata Party. He won again in the 2018 Madhya Pradesh Legislative Assembly election. He polled 84,302 votes and defeated his nearest rival, Bharat Singh Yadav, an independent by a margin of 41,733 votes. He retained the Panagar seat for the third time winning the 2023 Madhya Pradesh Legislative Assembly election.
