= Siyaram Tiwari (writer) =

Indian Hindi professor, scholar and author (born 1934)

Siyaram Tiwari (born 5 December 1934) is an Indian Hindi scholar and author.

== Education ==
- M.A. (Hindi) – Bihar University, Muzaffarpur, 1958
- Ph.D. – Patna University, 1962
- D.Litt. – Patna University, 1974

== Career ==
After teaching in several colleges of Bihar, Tiwari joined Visva-Bharati, Santiniketan (West Bengal), an institution founded by Nobel laureate Rabindranath Tagore and now a central university as a reader in the Department of Hindi in January, 1976. In due course, he rose to the rank of professor and became head of the Department of Hindi as well as dean of the Faculty of Humanities & Social Sciences. After final retirement in 1999 he was invited as a visiting professor in the University of Hyderabad in 2000 and Hungarian Transylvania University (Romania) in the year 2006. He served Nalanda Open University, Patna as chief co-ordinator in the Faculty of Languages for three years.

== Later work – Jo Yeh Padhe Hanuman Chalisa ==
Tiwari has published a comprehensive commentary on the most popular hymn of Lord Hanuman named Hanuman Chalisa with the name "Jo Yeh Padhe Hanuman Chalisa". Forty verses of the hymn have been explained so elaborately that the work has covered about 250 pages.

=== Distinction ===
- He has written more than twenty books on Hindi literature.
- After retirement he was Prime Minister's nominee in Viswa-Bharati Court.
- He assisted Union Public Service Commission in its confidential work in several capacities.
- He was member of different bodies of so many universities of India.
- He was felicitated by Bhartiya Hindi Parishad, a premier organization of University Hindi teachers in its annual conference held in Lucknow University in October 2011.
- He delivered lectures in Refresher Courses organized by University Grants Commission in different universities.
- He participated in national and international seminars organized by universities and learned institutions.
- He has published a large number of research papers, critical articles, book reviews etc. in reputed Hindi journals and magazines.
- He receives invitation of Akashwani and Doordarshan for talk etc.

=== Foreign country visited ===
He visited Romania in 2006 for delivering lectures.

== Published works ==
- Hindi Ke Madhyakalin Khandkavya, Delhi, 1964
- Bajjika Bhasha Aur Sahitya, Patna, 1964
- Haladhardaskrirt Sudamacharitra, Patna, 1966
- Siddhant, Addhyayan Aur Samasyayen, Patna, 1967
- Kavyabhasha, New Delhi, 1976
- Sahityashashtra Aur Kavyabhasha, Sahibabad, 1978
- Renu: Kartritva Aur Kritiyan, Patna, 1983
- Tulasidas Ka Acharyatva, New Delhi, 1985
- Pathanusandhan, Allahabad, 1987
- Nandlal Bose, New Delhi, 1991
- Sahitya Aur Hindi Sahitya, Patna, 1992
- Manjhan, New Delhi, 1998
- Jankivallabh Shastri: Kartritva Aur Kritiyan, Allahabad, 1998
- Anandshankar Madhavan Ki Sarasvat Sadhana, Mandar Vidyapith, 1999
- Chintan Ki Rekhayen, Delhi, 2003
- Hindi Sahitya: Bhashik Paridrishya, Delhi, 2005
- Suni Acharaj Karai Jani Koyi, New Delhi, 2008
- Bhartiya Sahitya Ki Pahchan, Patna, 2009
- Romania Yatra Ki Diary, Ahamedabad, 2009
- Pataliputra Se Santiniketan, Darbhanga, 2011
- Mahamanav Rabindranath Aur Anya Nibandh
- Jo Yeh Padhe Hanuman Chalisa
- Shailesh Matiyani Ke Patra (under print)

== Referred ==
- Who's Who of Indian Writers, Sahitya Akademi, New Delhi
- Sahityakar Vivarnika, Central Hindi Directorate, New Delhi
- Hindi Sahitya ka Itihas by Dr Nagendra, New Delhi
- Hindi Sahitya ka Itihas by Dr Surya Prasad Dikshit, Lucknow

== Works on Siyaram Tiwari ==
- Dr Siyaram Tiwari: Vyakti Aur Upalabdhi by Dr Ramdeo Prasad & Dr Chakradhar Tripathi, Santiniketan, 2000
- Dr Siyaram Tiwari: Antarang Vivechan by Dr Ram Pravesh Singh, New Delhi, 2003
- Dr Siyaram Tiwari Ka Rachana Sansar by Dr Mahatha Ramkrishna Murari, Darbhanga, 2011
- Hindi Gadya Shitya ko Dr Siyaram Tiwari ki den by Dr Arvind Amar, Patna, 2019
- Patra : Dr Siyaram Tiwari ke Naam, Edited by Dr Uma Shankar Singh, Patna, 2020
