= S Prakash Tiwari =

Indian scientist (born 1948)

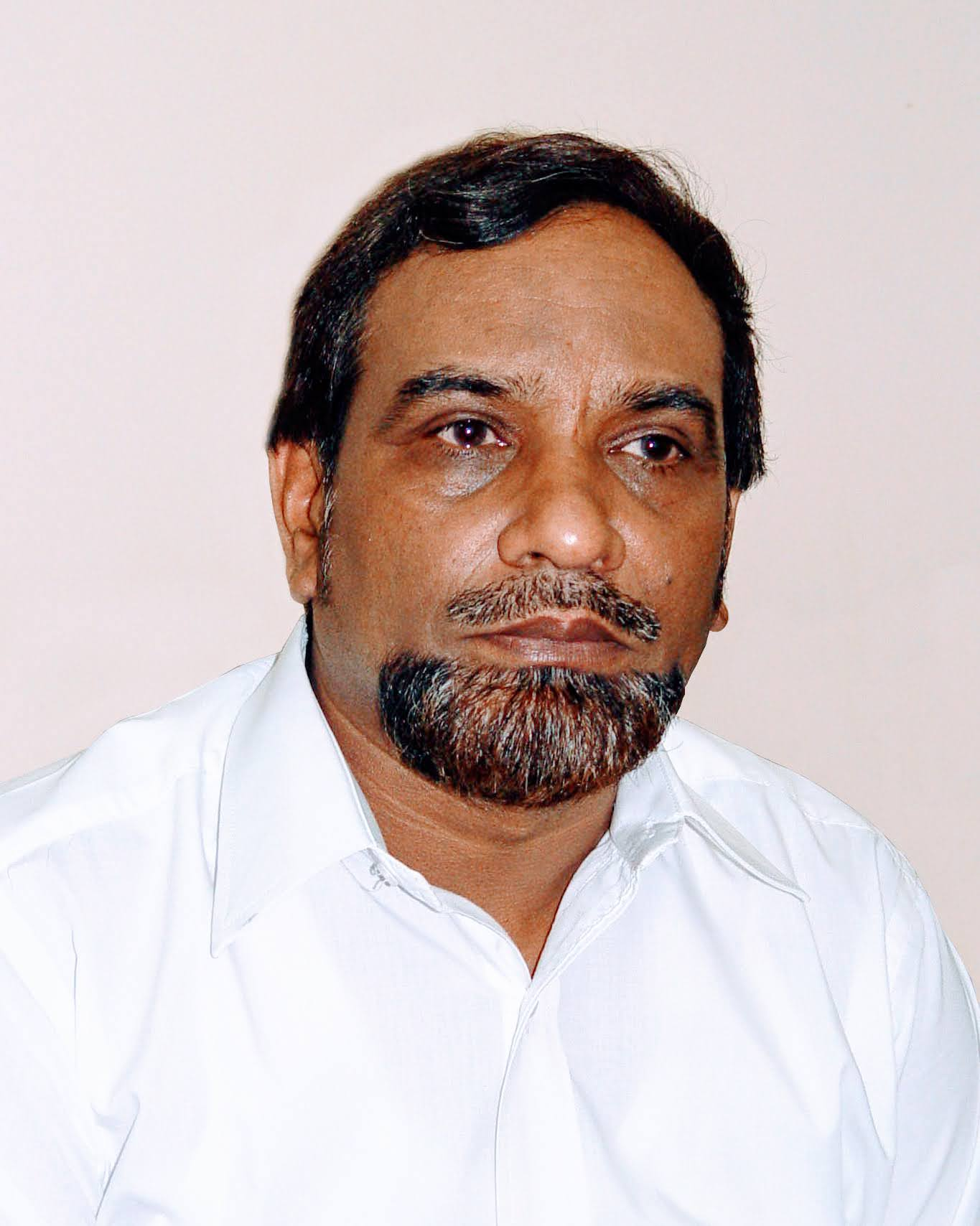
- Tiwari in 2005
- Born: 14 November 1948 (age 77); Jabalpur
- Occupations: Biotechnologist; Geneticist; Agriculturalist
- Years active: Since 1978
- Known for: Agricultural research

S Prakash Tiwari is an Indian biotechnologist, geneticist, agriculturalist and a former Deputy Director General of the Indian Council of Agricultural Research (ICAR). He was Vice-Chancellor of Swami Keshwanand Rajasthan Agricultural University, Bikaner, and Director of National Academy of Agricultural Research Management (NAARM), Hyderabad. He is also a former director of National Research Centre on Soybean, Indore.

== Early life and education ==
Tiwari was born in Jabalpur and obtained his PhD in genetics from Indian Agriculture Research Institute and further completed postdoc from National Institute of Agricultural Botany, Cambridge, UK.

== Career ==
Tiwari created a rapid method for plant anatomy using fluorescence microscopy in 1986. He is known for this work on soybean and identifying characteristic of pod anatomy associated with resistance to pod-shattering in soybean.

In 2005, Tiwari served as member of Exim Committee.

Tiwari is currently in the Advisory Committee of Society for Soybean Research and Development. He was instrumental in preparing an in-depth report on the state of plant genetic resources available for food and agriculture for the FAO (United Nations).

Tiwari served as chairman, Research Advisory Committee of Indian Institute of Soybean Research, Indore from 2016 to 2019. He served as Chairman of the National Biodiversity Authority under the Ministry of Environment, Forests and climate change, Government of India, Expert Committee on Normally Traded Commodities from 2005 to 2007. He also served as board member of Acharya N. G. Ranga Agricultural University, Hyderabad, from 2005 to 2008.

Considering the importance of pulses in meeting the dietary requirements of a growing number of vegetarians, an initiative led by Tiwari focused on developing new cropping systems for pulses.

== Awards ==
- As Vice Chancellor of the Swami Keshwanand Rajasthan Agricultural University, Bikaner, Tiwari was honoured by Amritam Jalam and Hariyalo Rajasthan for contributions towards rainwater harvesting and tree plantation.
- Fellow of the National Academy of Agricultural Sciences, India (FNAAS)

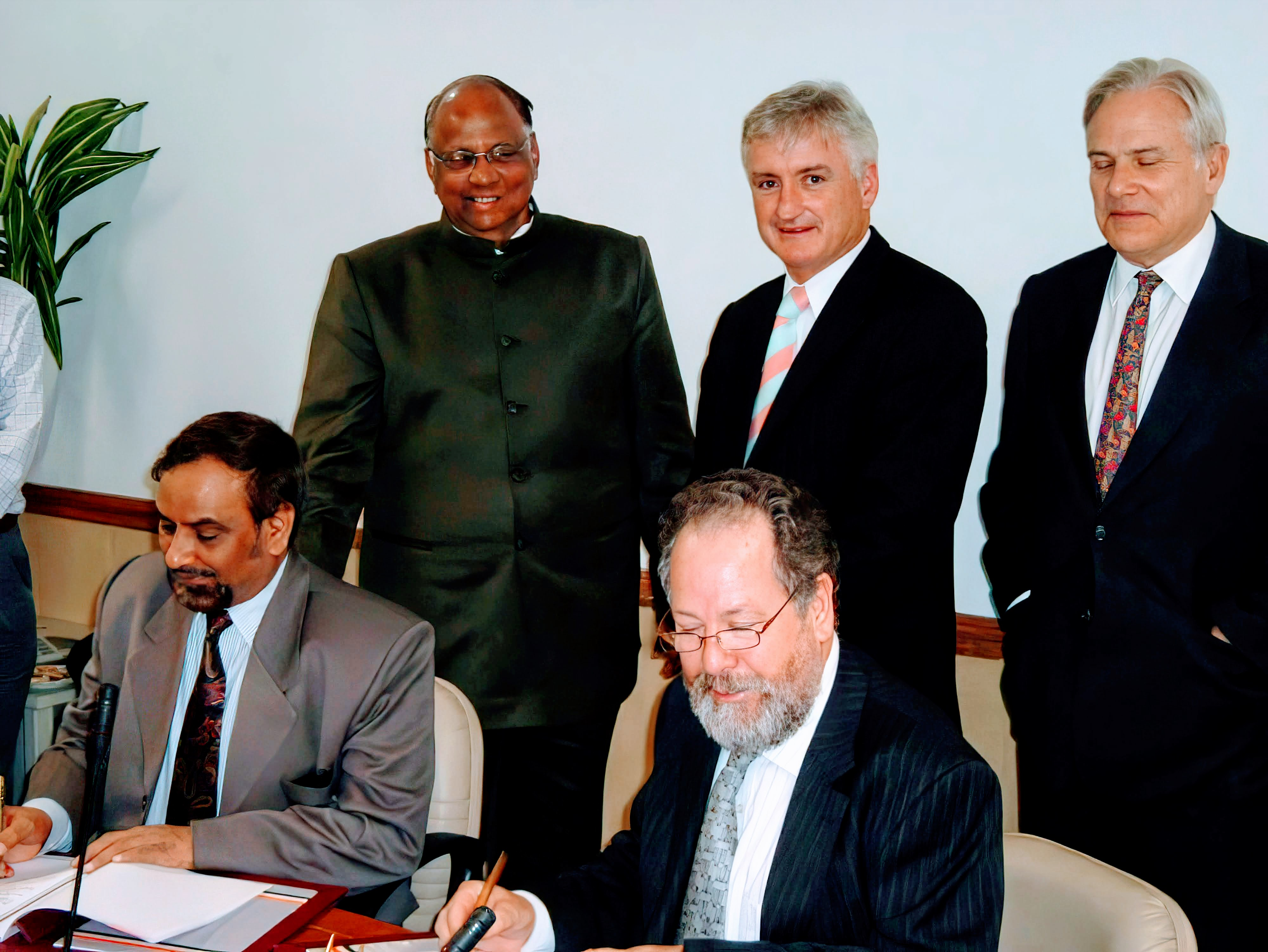
Tiwari signing diplomatic agreement with 28th Premier of Western Australia, Alan Carpenter and Sharad Pawar, Union Minister of Agriculture, Consumer Affairs, Food and Public Distribution and President of the International Cricket Council.

== Diplomatic missions ==
- Tiwari served as a member of the Governing Body of ITPGRFA.
- Tiwari served as chairman, U.S.-India Knowledge Initiative Tiwari organized President George W. Bush's visit to ANGRAU Hyderabad as a governing board member of ANGRAU and as Chairman of the Indo-US Knowledge Initiative.
- 1997: Established an Indo-Mongolian Friendship Farm at Darkhan, Mongolia, improving diplomatic relations with Mongolia
- 2007: Served as Chairman of Technical Advisory Committee (TAC) for the International Network for Genetic Evaluation of Rice (INGER) Bangkok, Thailand
- 2009: Tiwari led an international delegation to Afghanistan to strengthen Indo-Afghan relations as well as to explore the possibility of establishing an Afghan University of Agriculture and Technology with the support of India.
- The India-Brazil-South Africa Joint Working Group on Agriculture was initiated in Cape Town, South Africa, by Tiwari.
- A six-member expert team led by Tiwari visited Sri Lanka to assist in revitalising agriculture as part of the Rs. 500 crore package announced by the Indian government to assist in relief, reconstruction, and rehabilitation for three lakh refugees.
