= Maheshwar =

- Town
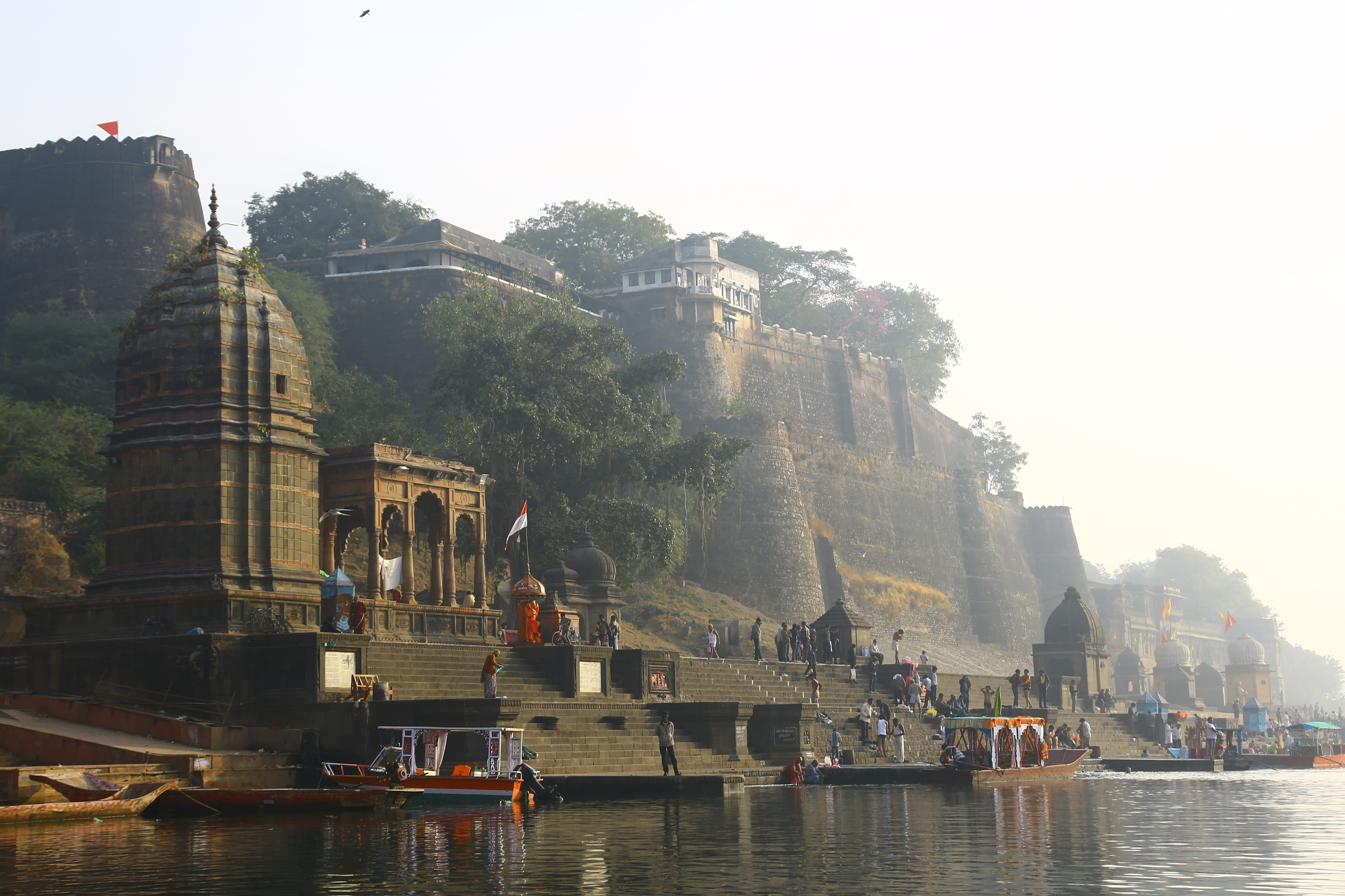
- Ahilya Fort at Maheshwar

- Location within Madhya Pradesh
- Coordinates: 22.11°N 75.35°E
- Country: India
- State: Madhya Pradesh
- District: Khargone
- Named for: Shiva
- Elevation: 154 m (505 ft)

Population (2011)
  - Total: 24,000

Languages Sanskrit
  - Official: Hindi
- Time zone: UTC+5:30 (IST)
- PIN: 451224
- Telephone code: 07283
- Vehicle registration: MP-10
- Website: www.khargone.nic.in

Maheshwar is a town in Khargone district of Madhya Pradesh state, in central India. It is located on State Highway-38 (Khargone city-Barwaha- Bandheri Highway),13.5 km east of National Highway 3 (Agra-Mumbai highway) and 91 km from Indore, the commercial capital of the state. The town lies on the northern bank of the Narmada River. It was the kingdom of Kartavirya Arjuna a Heheya king. Centuries later, it served as the capital of the Malwa during the Maratha Holkar reign until 6 January 1818, when Malhar Rao Holkar III shifted the capital to Indore.

== Etymology ==
The word Maheshwar in Hindi means Great God, an epithet of Lord Shiva.

== History ==
Writers such as HD Sankalia, PN Bose and Francis Wilford, among others, identify Maheshwar as the ancient town of Mahishmati. Also known as Minnagara to Greeko-Romans.

Maheshwar is believed to be built on the site of the ancient city of Somvanshya Shastrarjun Kshatriya, which is described in Hindu tradition as the capital of king Kartavirya Arjuna, (Shree Shastrarjun) who is mentioned in the Sanskrit epics Ramayana and Mahabharata. According to a popular legend, one day the King Sahasrarjun and his 500 wives went to the river for a picnic. When the wives wanted a vast play area, the King stopped the mighty river Narmada with his 1000 arms. While they were all enjoying themselves, Ravana flew by in his Pushpak Vimana. Downstream, when he saw the dry river bed, he thought it was an ideal place to pray to Lord Shiva. He made a Shivalinga out of the sand and began to pray. When Sahasrajuna's wives were done playing and they stepped out of the river bed, he let the waters flow. The voluminous river flowed down sweeping Ravana's Shivalinga along, messing up his prayers. Furious, Ravana tracked Sahasrajuna and challenged him. Armed to the hilt the mighty Ravana was in for a huge surprise. The mighty Sahasrarjuna with the 1000 arms pinned Ravana to the ground. Then he placed 10 lamps on his heads and one on his hand. After tying up Ravana, Sahasrarjuna dragged him home and tied him up to the cradle pole of his son. A humiliated Ravana stayed prisoner until his release was secured. Jamadagni rishi, Renuka Devi and Lord Parashurama with whom Kartavirya Arjuna's story is closely associated also lived nearby.

In Mahabharata, there is a narration of an unusual tradition wherein marriage as a civil institution was not universal in Mahishmati unlike in rest of Aryavarta, which is also narrated in the Telugu-language Andhra Mahabharata in ‘Sabha parva’.

As per the legend, there was a Nishada king named Nila who ruled over Mahishmati. King Nila had a daughter who was exceedingly beautiful. So much so that Agni (lord of fire) fell in love with her which was reciprocated. The princess always used to stay near the sacred fire of her father, causing it to blaze up with vigour. And king Nila's sacred fire, even if fanned, would not blaze until agitated by the gentle breath of her lips. Agni, assuming the form of a Brahman starts courting with the princess for long. But, one day the couple was discovered by the king, who became furious. Nila thereupon ordered the Brahman to be punished according to law. At this the illustrious deity flamed up in wrath and beholding the terrible flame, the king felt terrified and bent his head low on the ground. King hails Lord Agni and says he cannot punish a god who is responsible for the origin of Vedas, source of all Knowledge and Dharma. Pacified Agni then grants a boon to Nishada, and the King requests for the protection of his kingdom from any invasions. Agni swears to protect his kingdom on the condition that the king should sanctify pleasure out of pure love a legitimate action in his kingdom. Liberated from the orthodoxy of marriage as a prelude, women of Mahishmati enjoyed freedom that was then unheard of elsewhere in Arya-Varta.

Years later, after the epic war the victorious Yudhishthira plans on conducting a Yagna by winning over everyone else on Earth. Sahadeva, the youngest of Pandavas knowing that Lord Agni was protecting the Nishada kingdom, prays to Lord Agni successfully and there upon moves to Saurashtra kingdom.

Of note, even to this day, the Sahasrarjun temple at Maheshwar lights 11 lamps in honour of Lord Agni blessing the Kingdom. Alternatively, this tradition is attributed to Sahasrarjun queens humiliating captive ten-headed Ravana by lighting up candles on his foreheads.

In the late eighteenth century, Maheshwar served as the capital of the great Maratha queen Rajmata Ahilya Devi Holkar. She embellished the city with many buildings and public works, and it is home to her palace, as well as numerous temples, a fort, and riverfront ghats (broad stone steps which step down to the river).

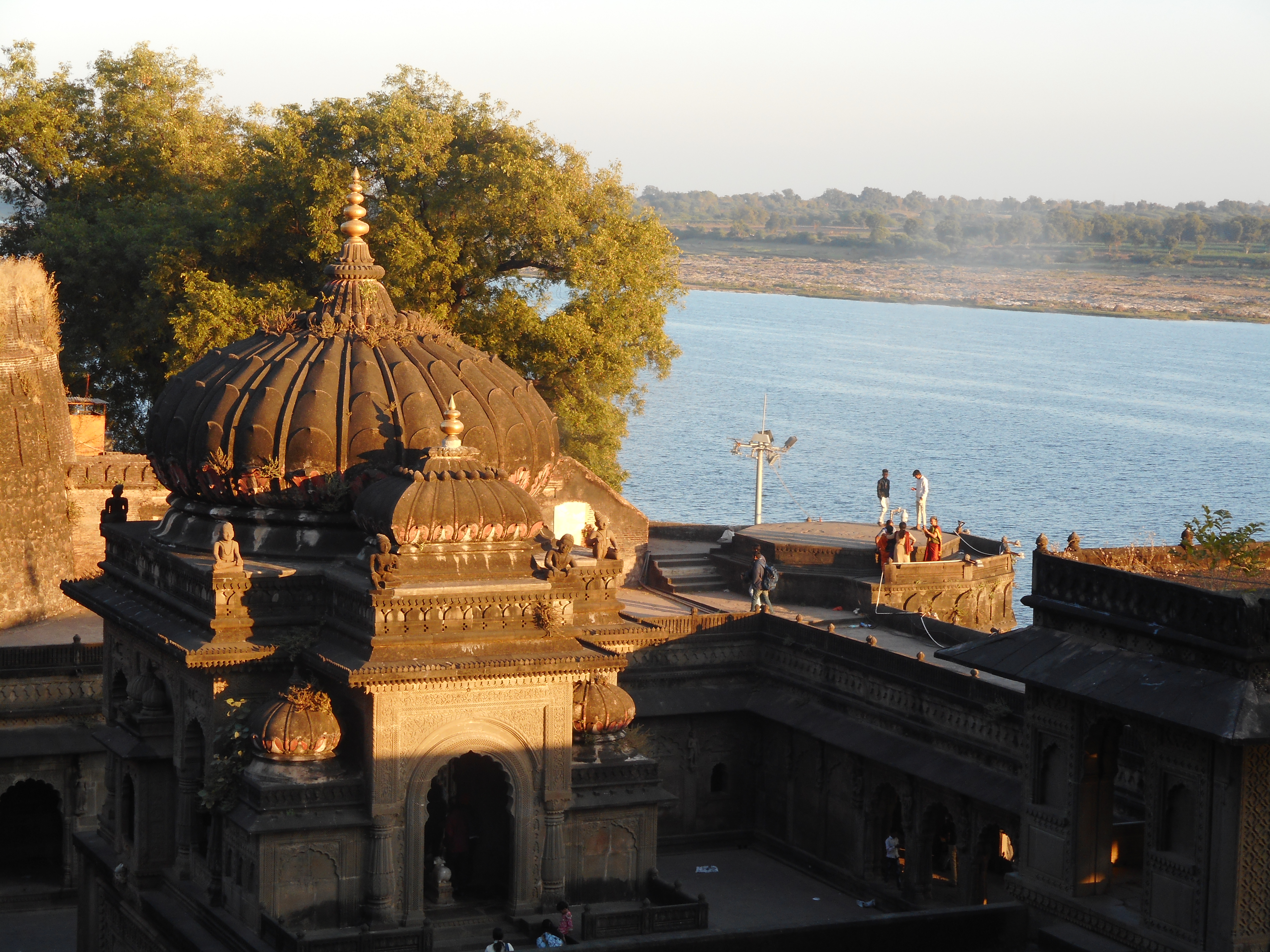
Temples situated within Fort Ahilya - A Major Attraction in Maheshwar

Jagadguru Kripaluji Maharaj has performed various akhand (continues) sankirtan outside the Shiva temple at Maheshwar for more than months. Even though Kripaluji was from mahu (30 km from Maheshwar), he frequently visited this place in his early life with devotees of lord Krishna to perform sankirtan on the banks of the Narmada river in Maheshwar.

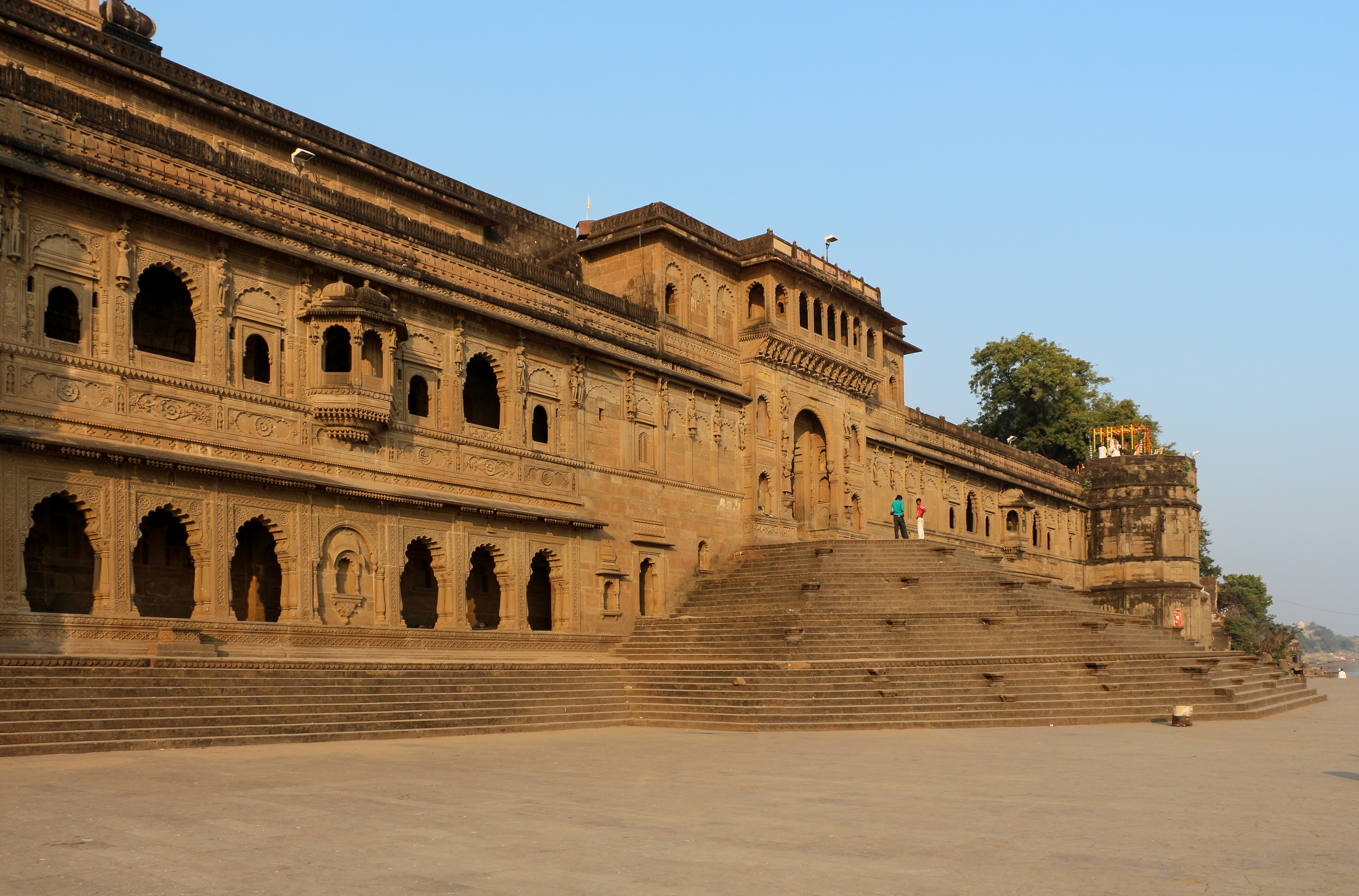
Fort Ahilya of the Holkar dynasty, in Maheshwar.

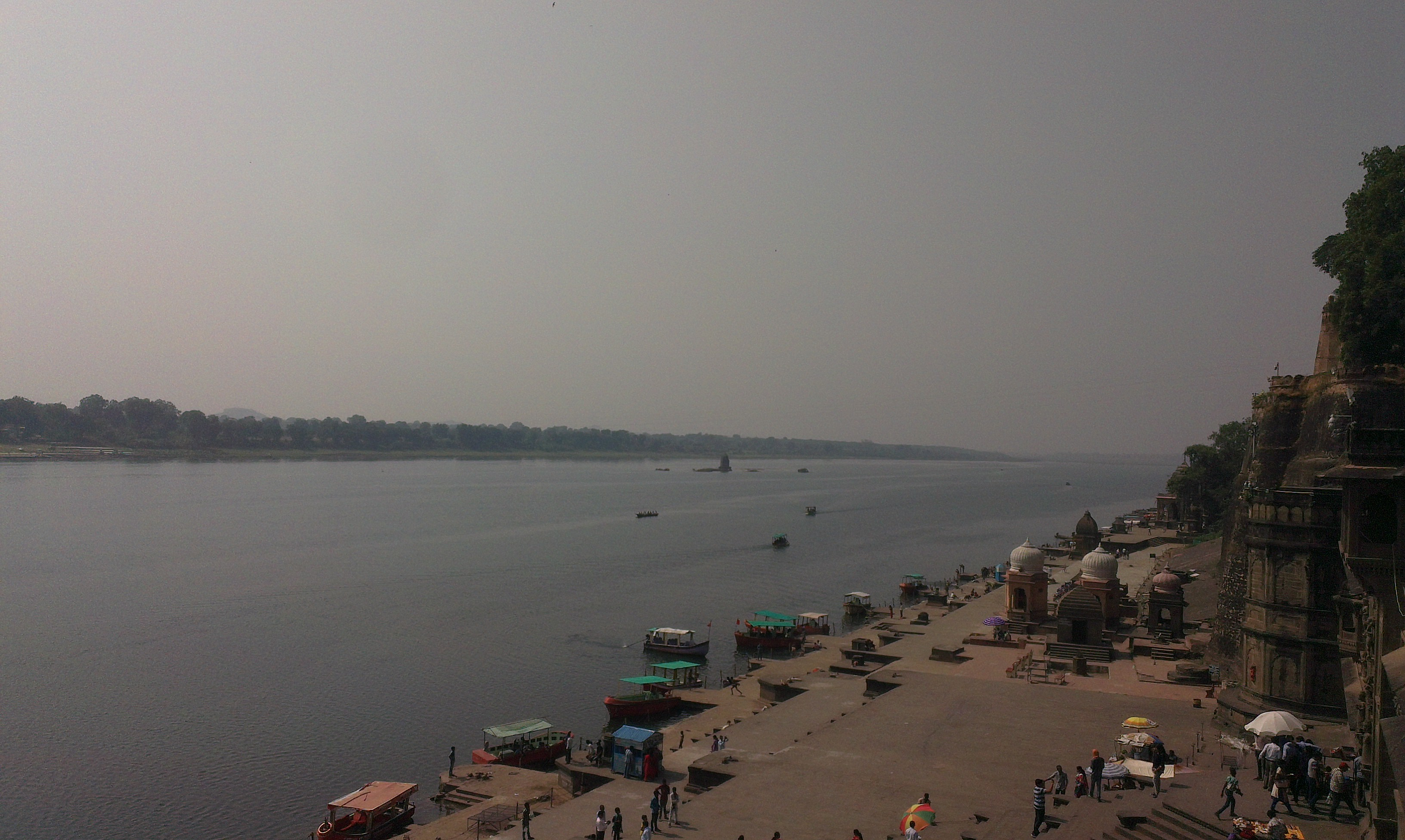
Narmada river, Maheshwari

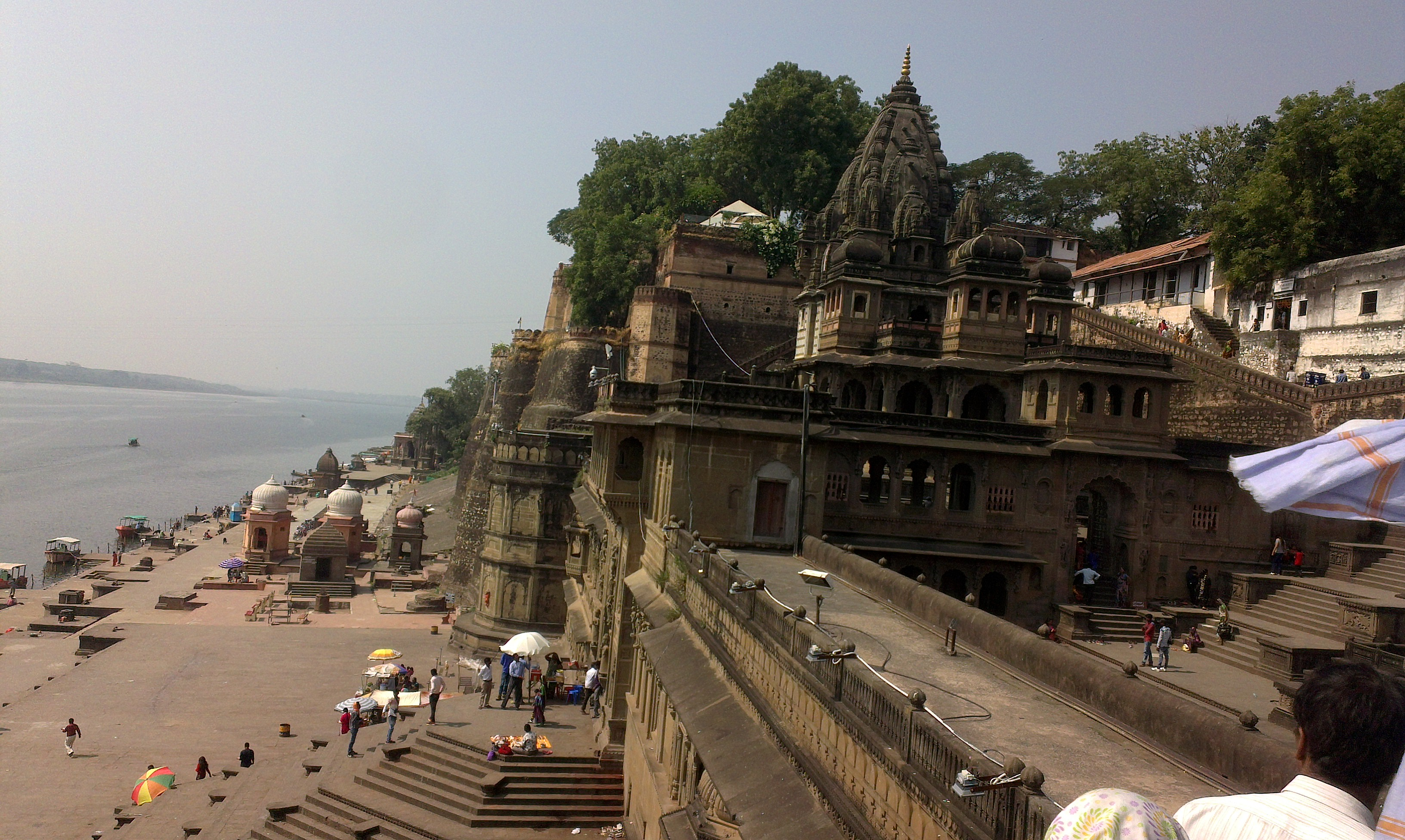
Fort of Maheshwar and Narmada river

== Demographics ==
As of 2001 India census, Maheshwar had a population of 24000. Males constitute 51% of the population and females 49%. Maheshwar has an average literacy rate of 67%, higher than the national average of 59.5%: male literacy is 75%, and female literacy is 59%. In Maheshwar, 14% of the population is under 6 years of age.

Religion in Maheshwar
Religion	Percent
Hindus	77.86%
Muslims	20.70%
Jains	0.91%
Sikhs	0.35%
Others†	0.2%
Christians	0.11%
Distribution of religions †Includes Buddhists (0.2%).

== Economy ==
Maheshwari sari laced with bright Zari (brocade)

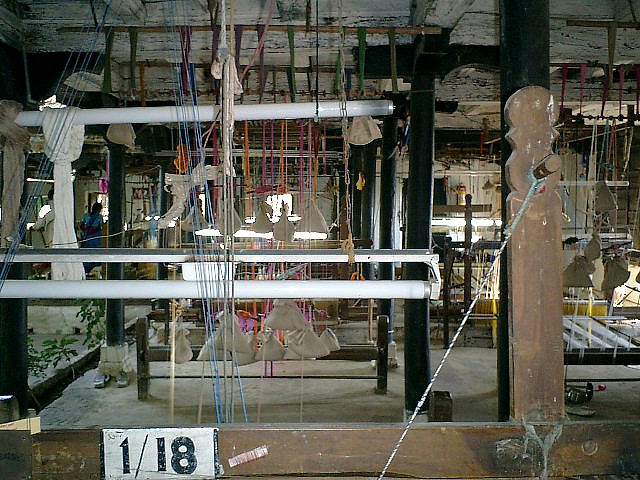
Looms at Rehwa society, Maheshwari handloom sarees weavers society, Maheshwar.

Maheshwar has been a centre of handloom weaving since the 5th century. Maheshwar is the home of one of India's finest handloom fabric traditions. It is noted as a centre for weaving colourful Maheshwari Saree . It rose to popularity under the rule of strong maratha leader Queen Devi Ahilya Bai Holkar. Ahilya Bai wanted royal gifts for the royal guest. Hence weavers from Mandu and Surat were hired and Maheshwari Saree and turban were weaved. It is said that Ahilya Bai herself designed first saree. These sarees were worn by female members of the royal court. These saris were also gifted to royal guests. The inspiration for the designs in saris are visible in the local architecture. These cotton saris are weaved with distinctive designs involving stripes, checks, and floral borders.

To save the local handloom industry Rehwa Society, an NGO founded by the Holkars, in 1979. This NGO gave women employment and revived the town's textiles. About 130 weavers associated with the society produce over 100,000 metres of fine fabrics a year. The weaving centre is located in one of Maheshwar's historic buildings. Rehwa Society also provides a free school for weavers' children and runs a low-cost health scheme. There are few other small local organisations involved in weaving of sarees and other fabrics.

Ahilya Fort which is now converted into a heritage hotel, founded by 'Maharajkumar Shrimant Shivaji Rao Holkar' (Prince Richard Holkar of Indore), a descendant of both Ahilyabai Holkar and the only son of M.Gen. HH Maharaja Shrimant Yeshwant Rao II Holkar of Indore.

== Festivals ==
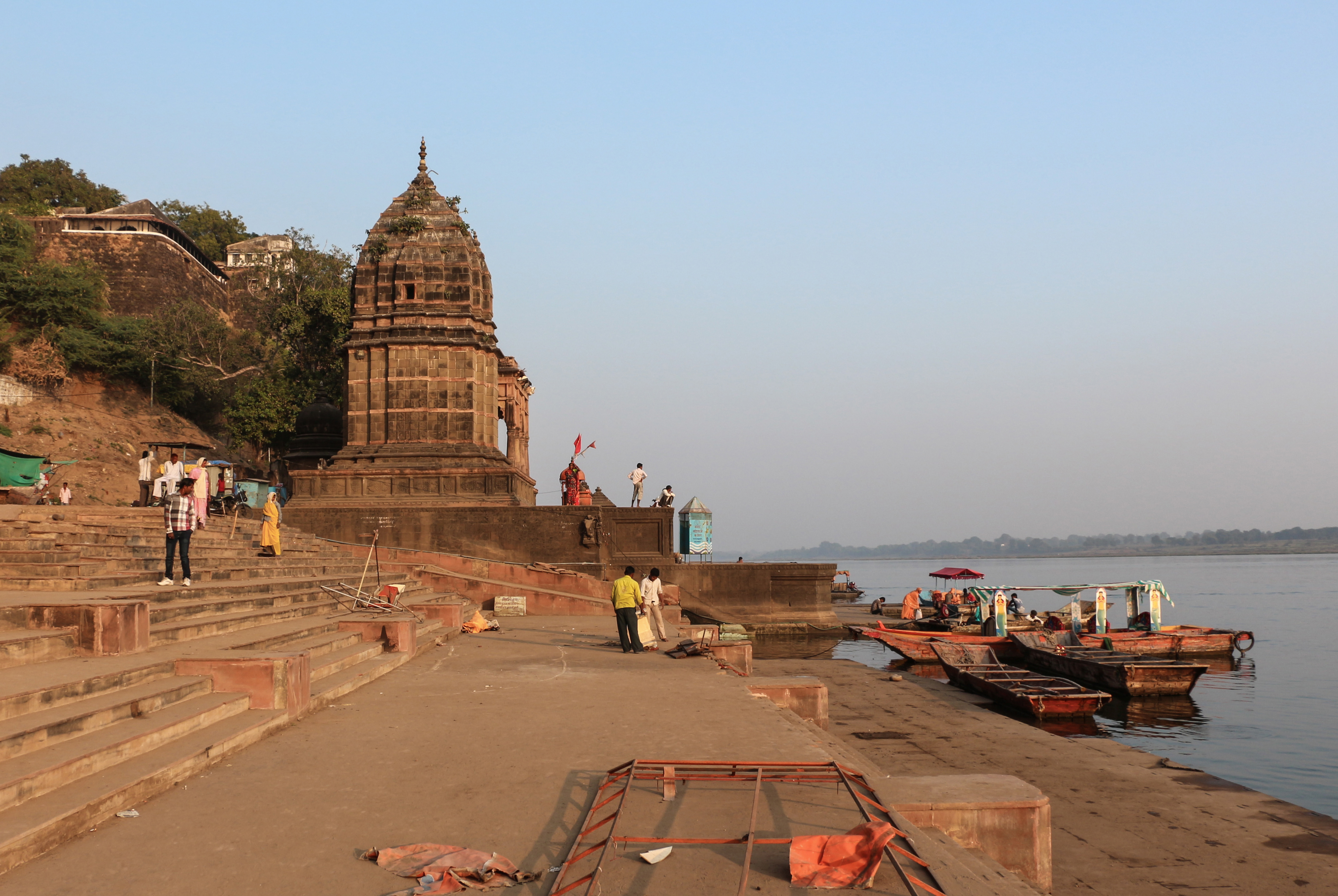
Ghats on the banks of river Narmada

Maheshwar is full of festivals and celebrations, some are: Nag Panchami, Gudi Padava, Teez (New year celebrations according to the Hindu calendar), All Mondays of Shravan month, (DOLA of Kashivishwnath on last Monday, bhang is served as prasad of Shiva), Mahashivratri, Samoti Amavas, and all other Indian festivals. There are many visiting places like gold swing is also their and it is situated at Rajwada. Maheshwar also has the temple of Goddess Vindhyavasini Bhavani, one of the 24Shaktipeeths of Goddess Parvati.

Every year on the immediately preceding Sunday of Makar Sankranti (i.e. the Sunday just before the date when the Sun is about to enter the sign of Capricorn as per Indian Astrological / Sidereal calendar), Swaadhyaaya Bhavan Ashram (based at Mahalaxmi Nagar, Maheshwar) organizes Mahaamrityunjaya Rath Yaatraa in the town of Maheshwar. This Mahaamrityunjaya Rath Yaatraa was initiated by Shri Harvilas Aasopaa for the welfare of humanity, and is known to be the first of its kind in the world. The yatra intends to invoke blessings of Ayurved Murti Bhagwaan Sadaashiv Mahaamrityunjaya (who is regarded as the primordial and supreme doctor), and it starts from Swaadhyaaya Bhawan Ashram and culminates at the banks of the holy river Narmada.

== Film industry and Maheshwar ==
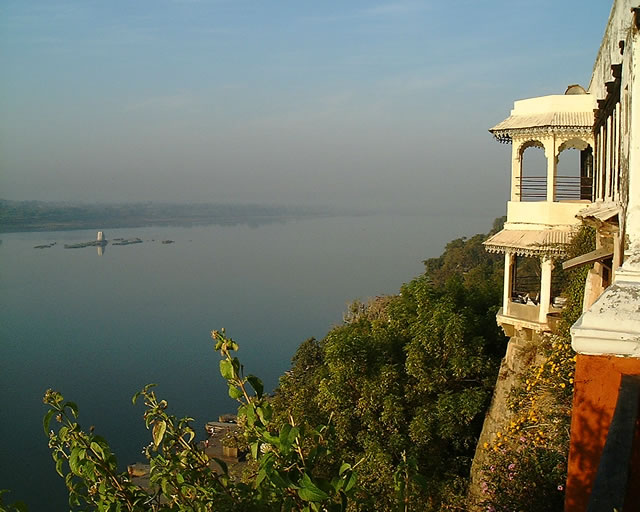
A scenic view of Narmada from top of the Ahilya fort

The exquisite beauty of Maheshwar and river Narmada is captured in some Bollywood and Tamil/ Kollywood movies. Some of the movies shot in Maheshwar including the movie Ashoka, Tulsi (by actor and director Sachin), Mahashivratri, A.R. Rehman's music video, Tamil movie Alai Payuthey’s song "Snehithane..." and " yaro yaro di..." directed by Maniratnam, Tamil movie Leelai's song "Oru kili oru kili..." directed by Andrew Vasanth Louis, Yuvan Shankar Raja's musical Tamil movie Arrambam’s song "Adadada Arrambame..." directed by Vishnuvardhan. Also starting episodes of Zee TV serial Jhansi Ki Rani were shot here. In the 60's, Mythological film Mahashivratri’s shooting was done here and many local artists were given a chance to act in that. Then Aadi Shankaryachary’s shooting was completed in 1985. Many film stars from Bharat Bhushan to Shah Rukh Khan have visited Maheshwar and admired its rich culture and beauty. Also Yamala Pagla Deewana (Dharmendra, Sunny Deol, Bobby Deol, Kulraj Randhawa come here for shooting) film's 50 minute shot done here at Bazar Chowk, Rajwada, Ahilyabai Chhatri, Ahilya Ghaat, and many more location. The shooting of "Radha Nachegi" song from Tevar was done here. Also, recently few scenes of Bajirao Mastani, Neerja and Gautamiputra Satakarni were shot here. Recently the film Pad Man directed by R.Balki starring Akshay Kumar, Sonam Kapoor, and Radhika Apte was shot here. And recently shot title track of Prabhu Deva directed, an Arbaz Khan production movie Dabangg 3 starring Salman Khan was shot for 2 weeks. Shooting of Kalank is also done here.

== Culture ==
Maheshwar is a culturally prosperous town and its importance is described in Puranas and throughout history.

== Temples ==
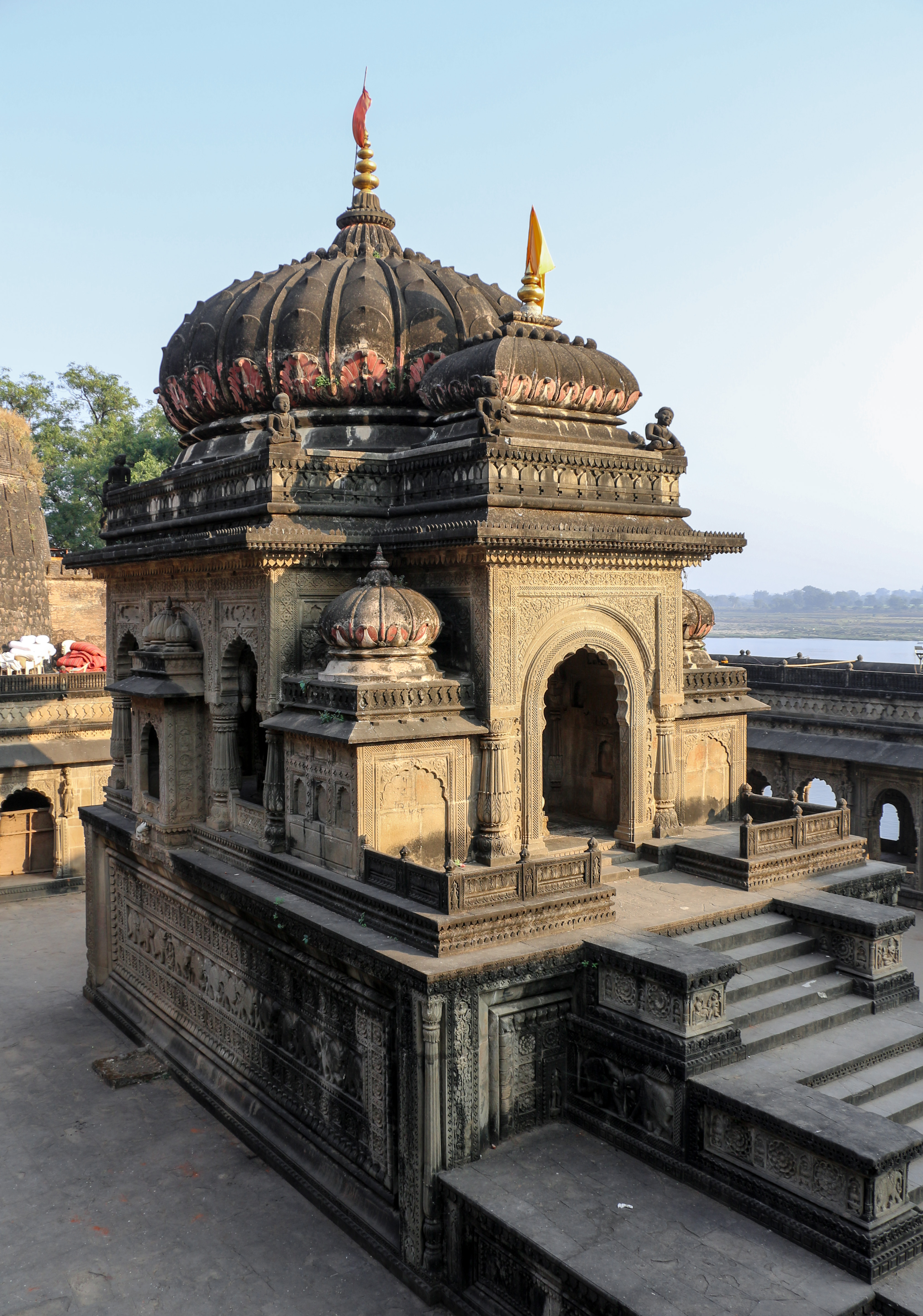
Chhatri of Vithoji in the Maheshwar Fort

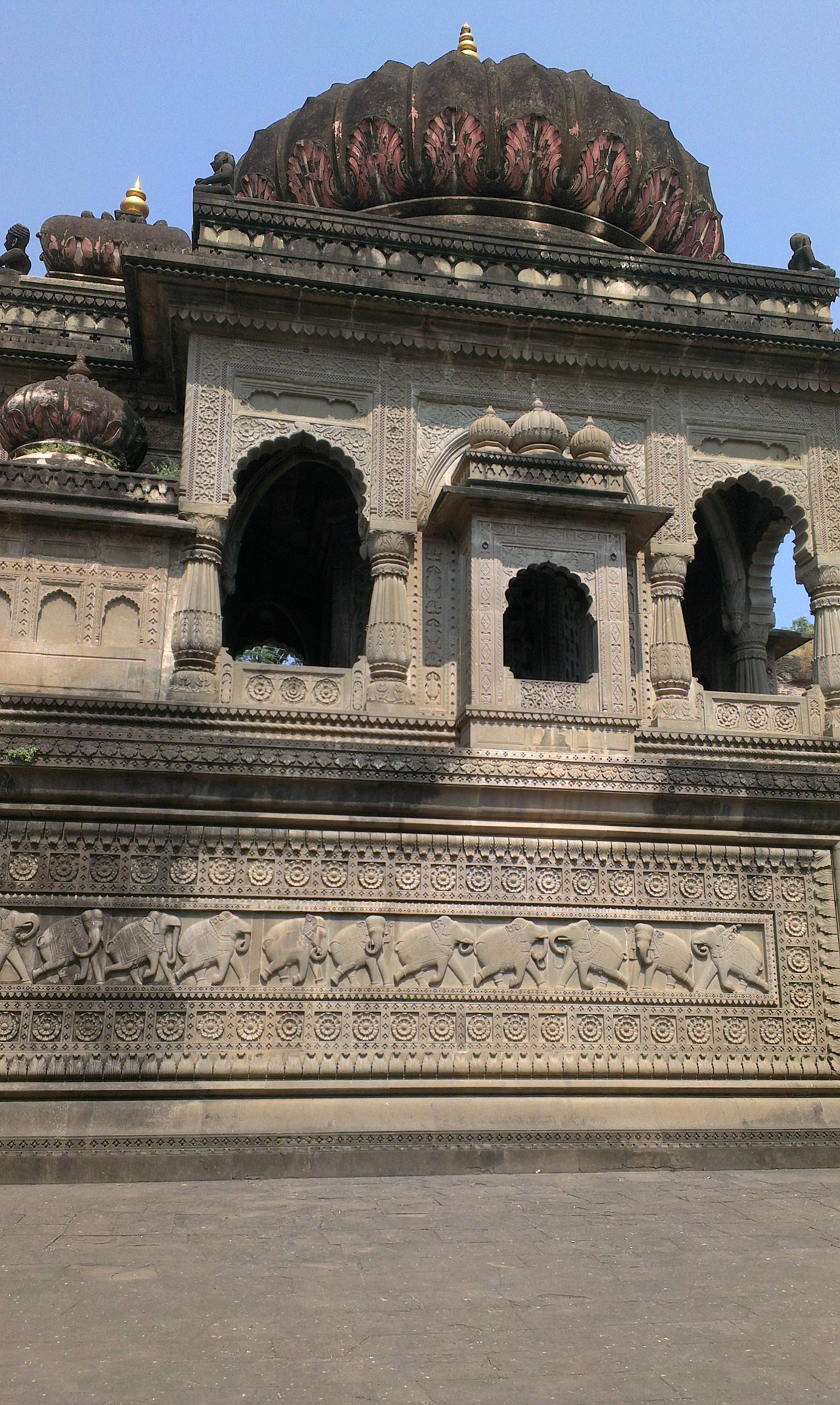
Fort of Maheshwar

It is said that there are more than 100 temples in Maheshwar. it seems these temples are telling the long history of Maheshwar, most temples are spread along the right bank of the river near Maheshwar ghat and the vicinity of the fort.

- Sahastar Arjun Temple near the holy river Narmada, Rajrajeshwar Mandir, Kashi Vishwanath Mandir, Chaturbhuj Narayan Mandir, Ahilya Mata's Chhatris, Chintamani Ganpati Mandir, Pandharinath Mandir, Bhawani Mata Mandir, Gobar Ganesh Mandir, Banke Bihari, Anant Narayan Mandir, Khedapati Hanuman, Ram and Krishna Mandir and Narsingh Mandir. Kaleshwar and Jwaleshwar Mandir are located little far off. Baneshwar Mandir is located in a small island in the Narmada River.
- Temple of Vindhyavasini Maheshwari, which is one of the Shakta pithas of Goddess Kali.
- Sahastradhara is a place where Narmada River divides into several small streams and flows forcefully. An adventurous water sporting centre is being planned here.
- Ek Mukhi Datta Temple is newly constructed temple in Sahastradhara, Jalkoti, Maheshwar. It's also called "Shiva Datta Dham". This temple is constructed in 30 acres of area. Temple area is approx 10000 sq. feet. The temple is situated at the bank of historical Narmada River in its most serious, calm, adventured and horrible form. The main attraction in this temple is the very beautiful idols of Lord Ek Mukhi Datta, Maa Narmada and Lord Ganesha. Sadguru Shri Narayan Maharaj of Shri Kshetra Narayanpur (Anna) and his disciple are building "Char Datta Dhams" in four different directions in India, of which 2 Dhams have already been completed.
  - First of the Char Dattadhams has been constructed in Madhya Pradesh "Shiva Datta Dham, Jalkoti, Maheshwar, Khargone Shiv Datta Dham, Jalkoti, Maheshwar, Madhya Pradesh"
  - Second of the Char Datta dhams is in Kanyakumari Anusaya Datta Dham, Vattakottai, Kanyakumari"Anusaya Datta Dham, Vatta-kottai Vattakottai Fort, Anju Gramam, Kanyakumari".
  - Third of the Char Dattadhams is near Kolkata "Bramha Datta Dham" and it is under construction situated in Bramha Datta Dham, Baruipara, Kolkata"Baruipara". This will be the largest Hindu temple in West Bengal.
  - Shri Atri Dattadham, Himachal Pradesh.

== Other landmarks ==
Revathi Kamath's Work

- Community Centre
- Weavers’ Housing Project
- School for Weavers’ Children

== Nearby attractions ==
- Mandu (Mandav) (38 km) - A medieval fortress-town, which served as the capital of the 15th-16th century Malwa Sultanate, is known for many iconic sultanate period palaces and structures(15th and 16th century) and some ruins of the Paramara period (11th to 13th century). It is on the tentative list of the UNESCO World Heritage sites.
- Navdatoli (on the opposite bank) - A Chalcolithic archaeological site located on the opposite bank of the Narmada river.
- Kasrawad (20 km from Maheshwar, 6 km from Navdatoli)- A Buddhist archaeological site. Kasrawad was an important Buddhist centre during the ancient and early medieval periods of the Indian history.
- Khargone (55 km from Maheshwar)- Ruins of ancient temples.
- Oon or Un (70 km from Maheshwar, 17 km from Khargone) - A small town with the ruins of ancient temples.
- Mandleshwar (8 km from Maheshwar) - Mandleshwar Mahadev Temple is known for the famous 8th century debate between Maṇḍana Miśra and Adi Shankaracharya at the Gupteshwar Mahadev Temple. Swami Vivekananda stayed here and meditated.
- Raverkhedi (36 km from Mandleshwar, located between Maheshwar and Omkareshwar) - Samadhi of Maratha Peshwa Baji Rao I who died and was cremated at Raverkhedi in 1740. Bakawan located close to Raverkhedi is known for the Narmada river pebbles resembling the shivalingas.
- Omkareshwar (67 km via Barwaha, 87 km via Bajirao Peshwa's Samadhi) - One of the twelve jyotirlingas of Lord Shiva located on a hilly island of the Narmada River called Mandhata. Ruins of some ancient temples are also located around Omkareshwar.

== Image gallery ==
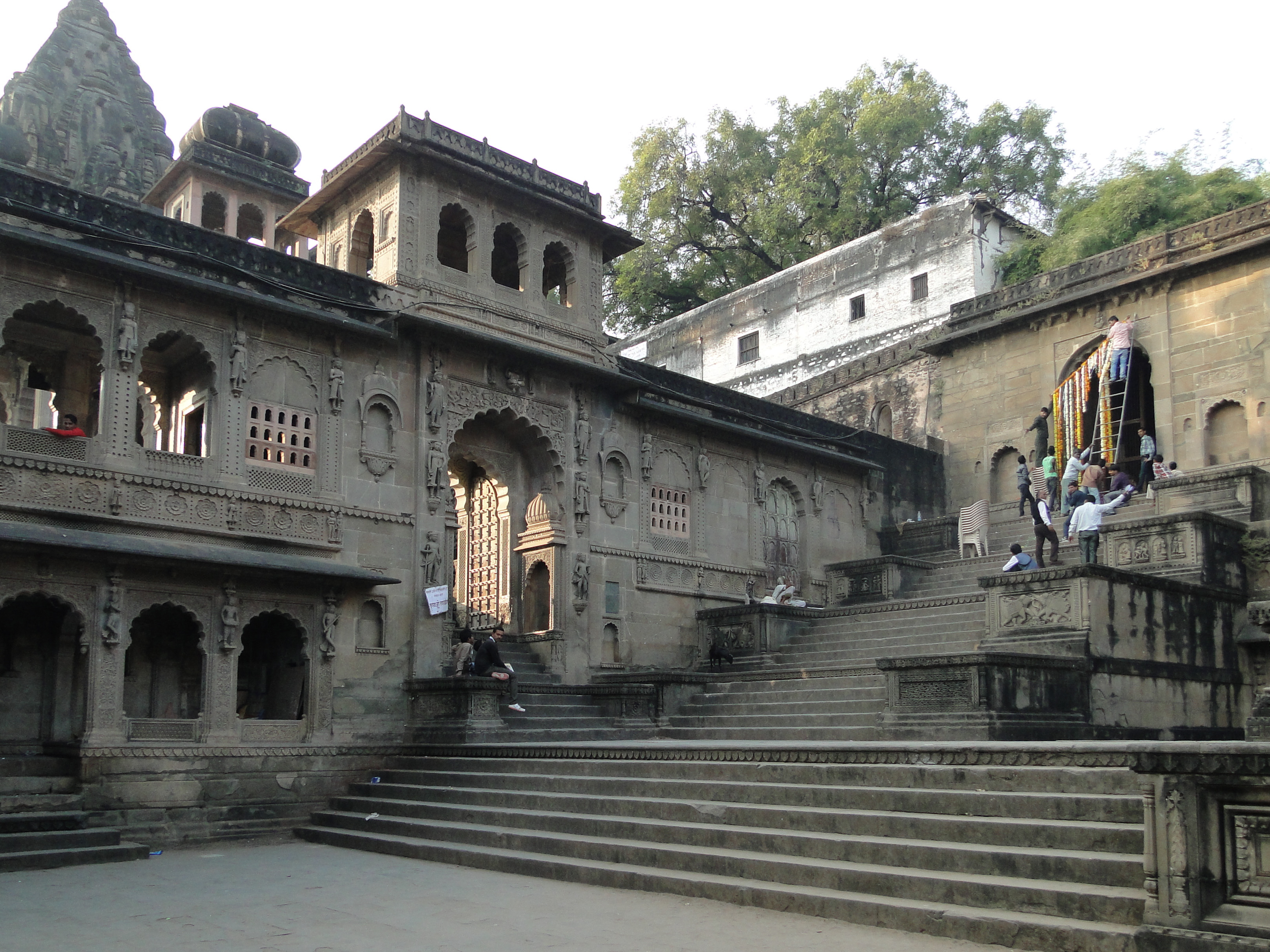
Fort built by Mata Ahilyabai Holkar the ruler of Maheshwar Mandir at Maheshwar.

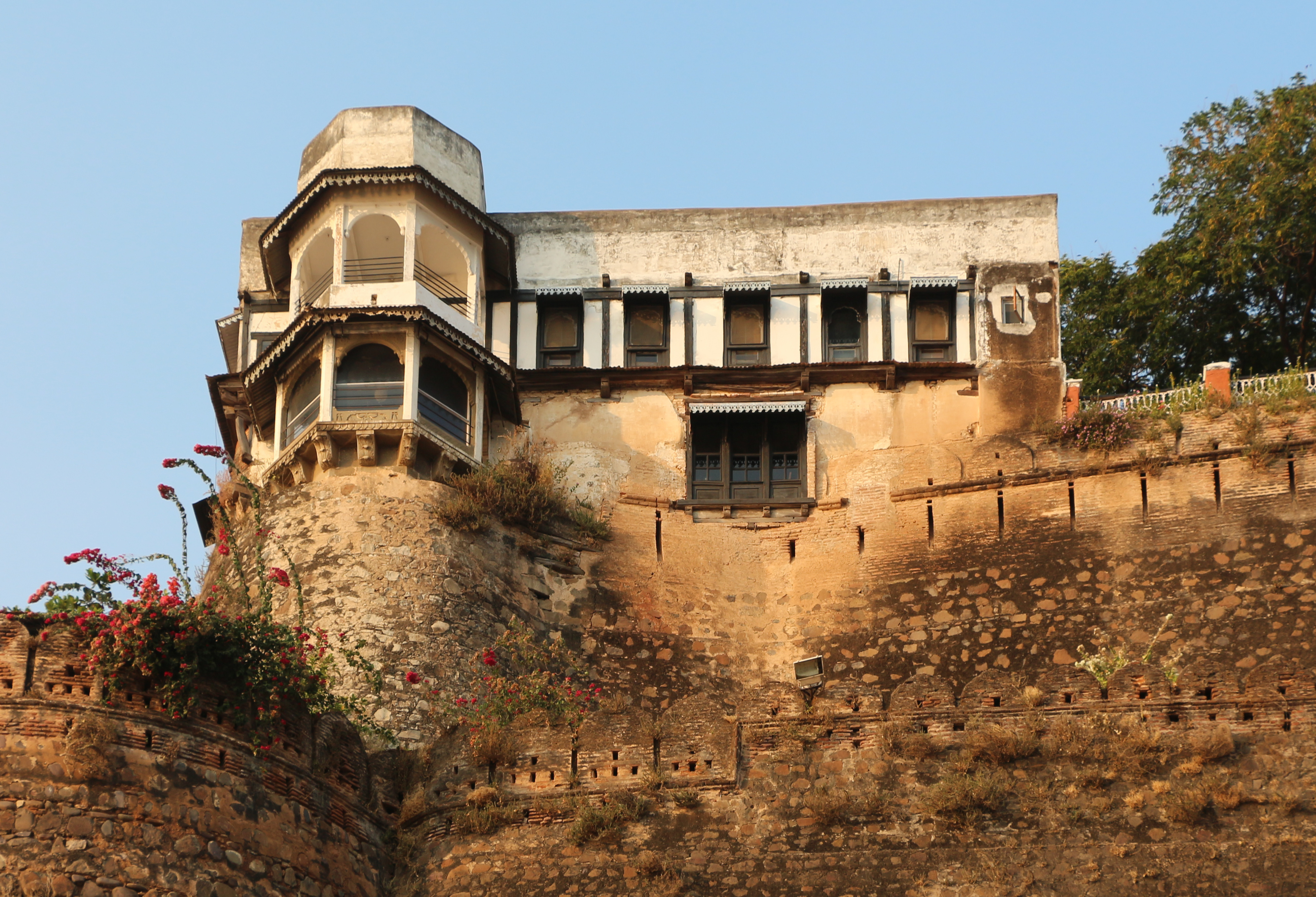
Royal Palace of Maheshwar.

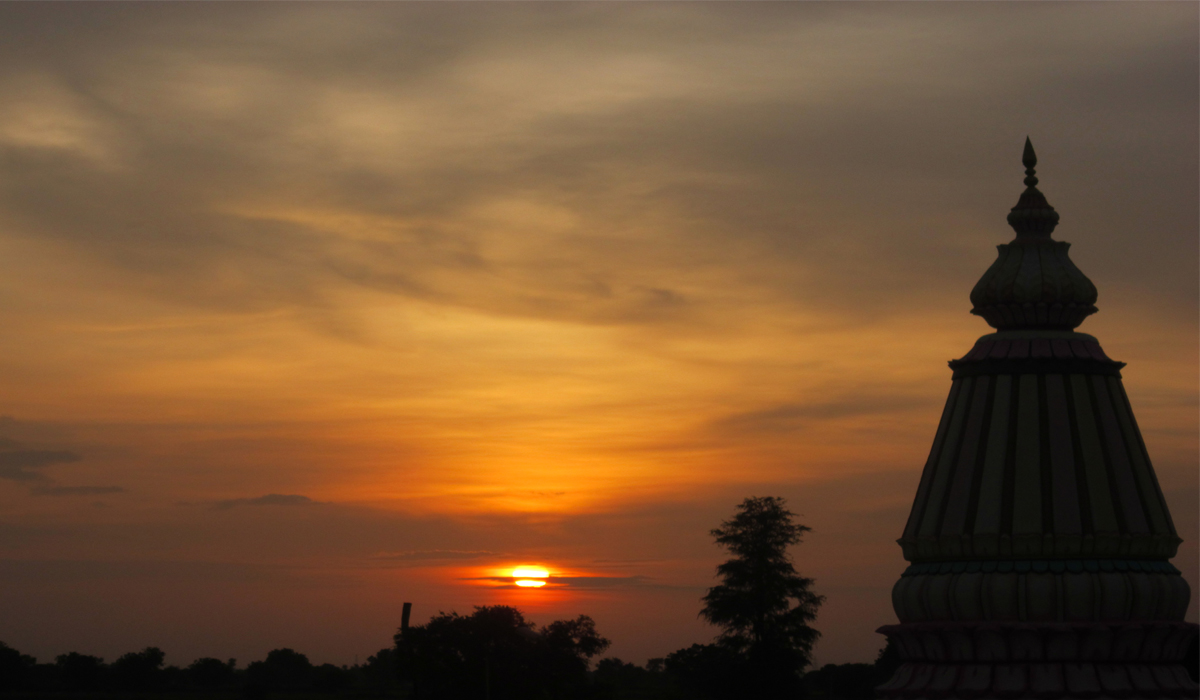
Sunset view from Datta Temple, Jalkoti, Madhya Pradesh.

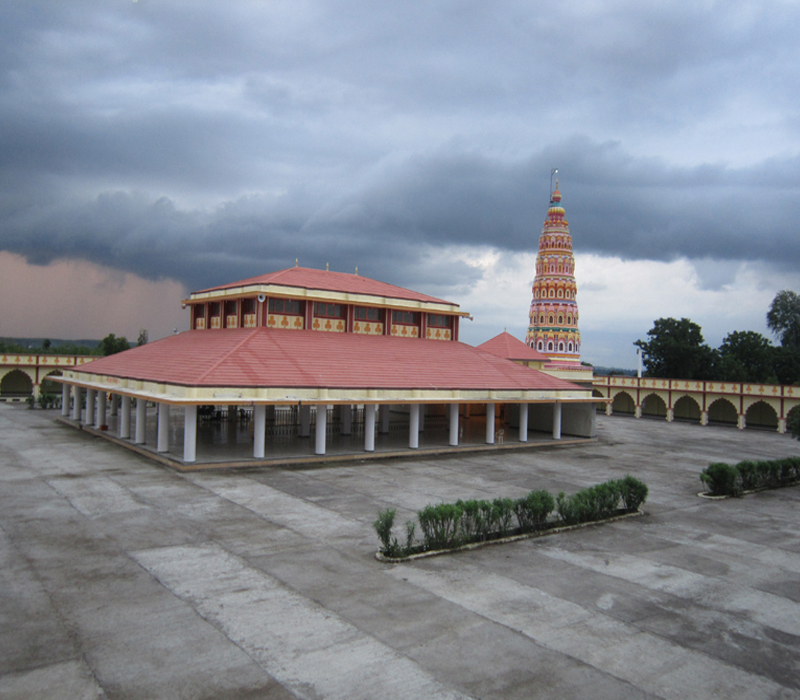
Ek Mukhi Datta Temple at Sahastradhara, Jalkoti

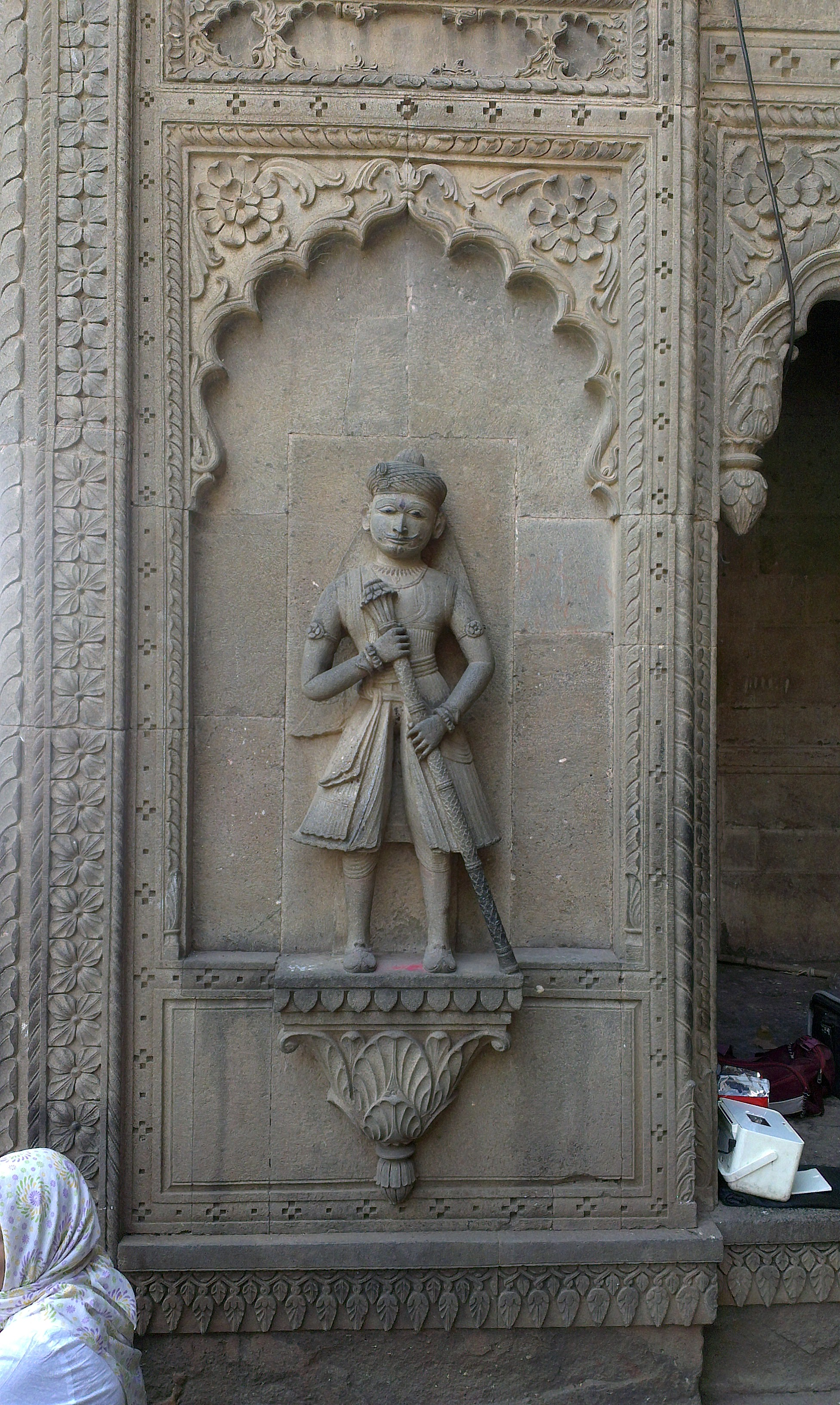
Art at Fort of Maheshwar

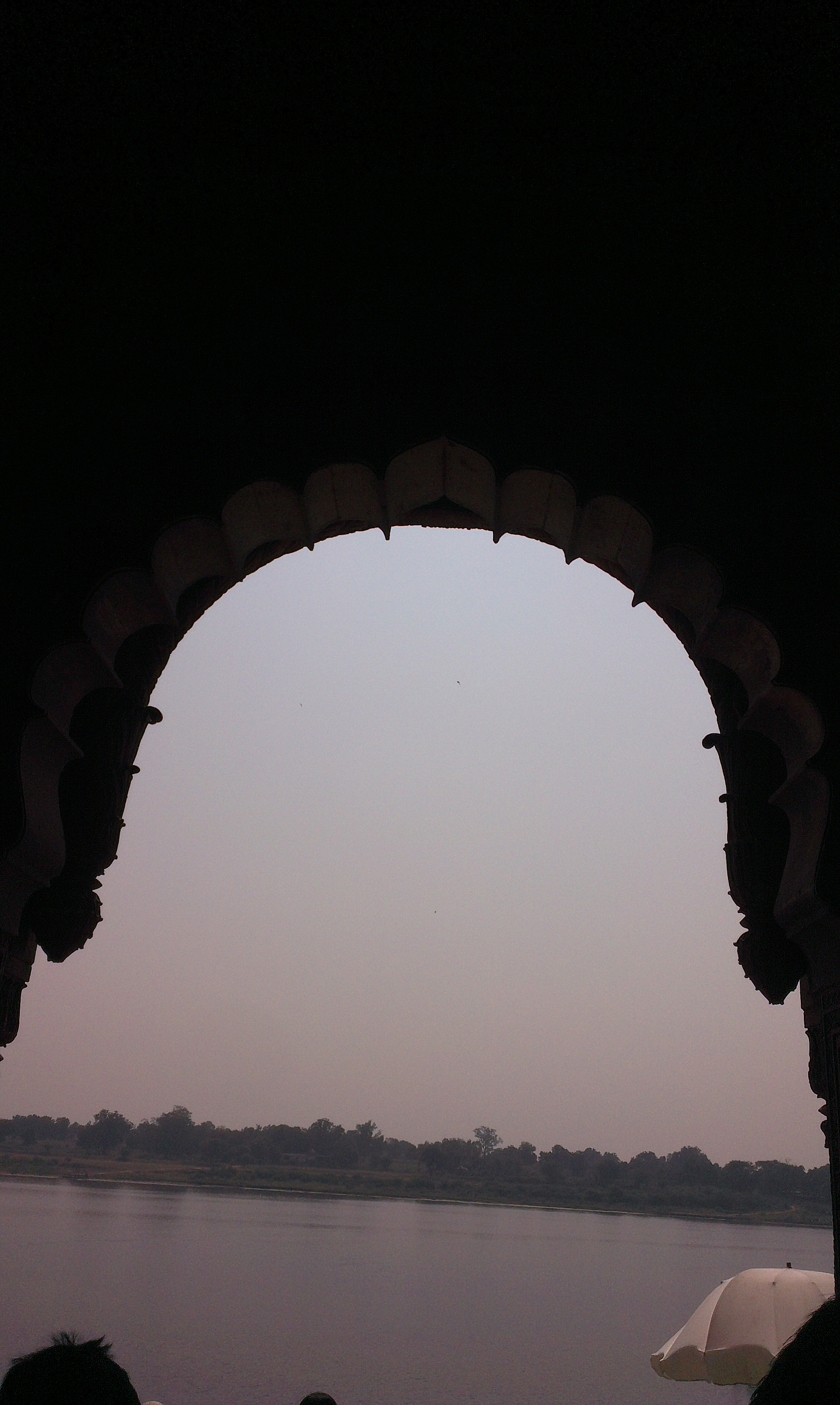
View of the Narmada from Fort of Maheshwar

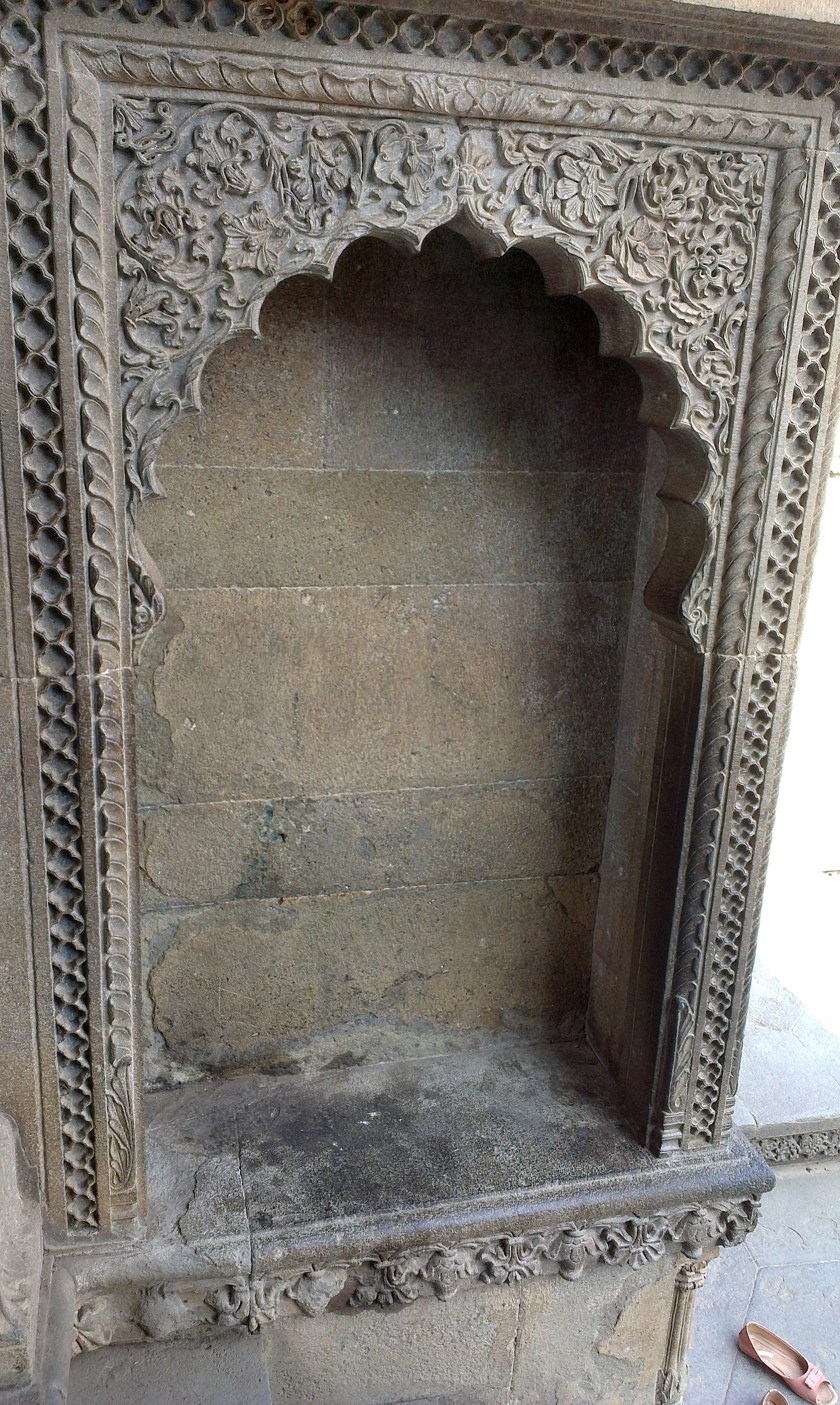
Work at Maheshwar fort

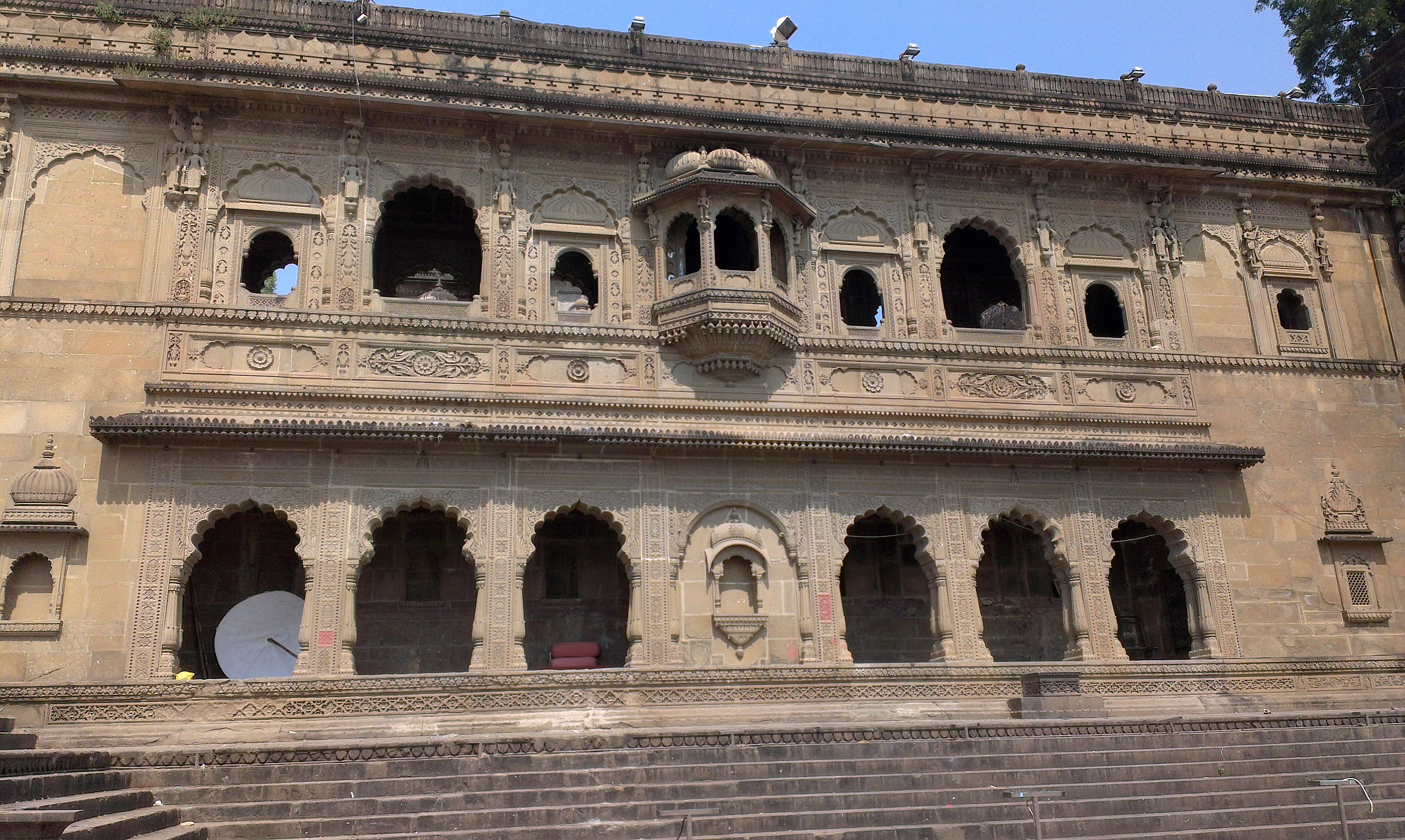
Maheshwar Fort

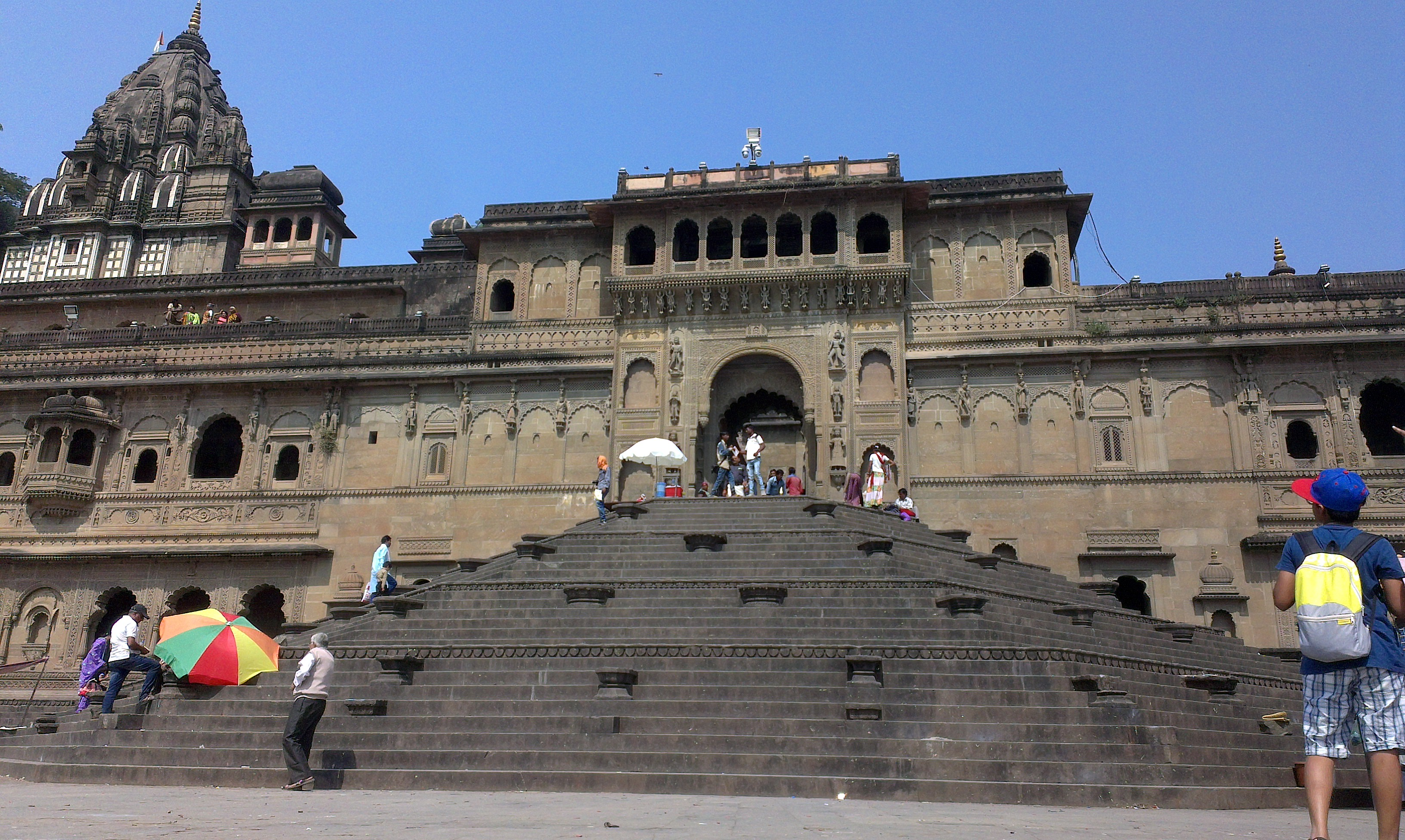
Maheshwar Fort

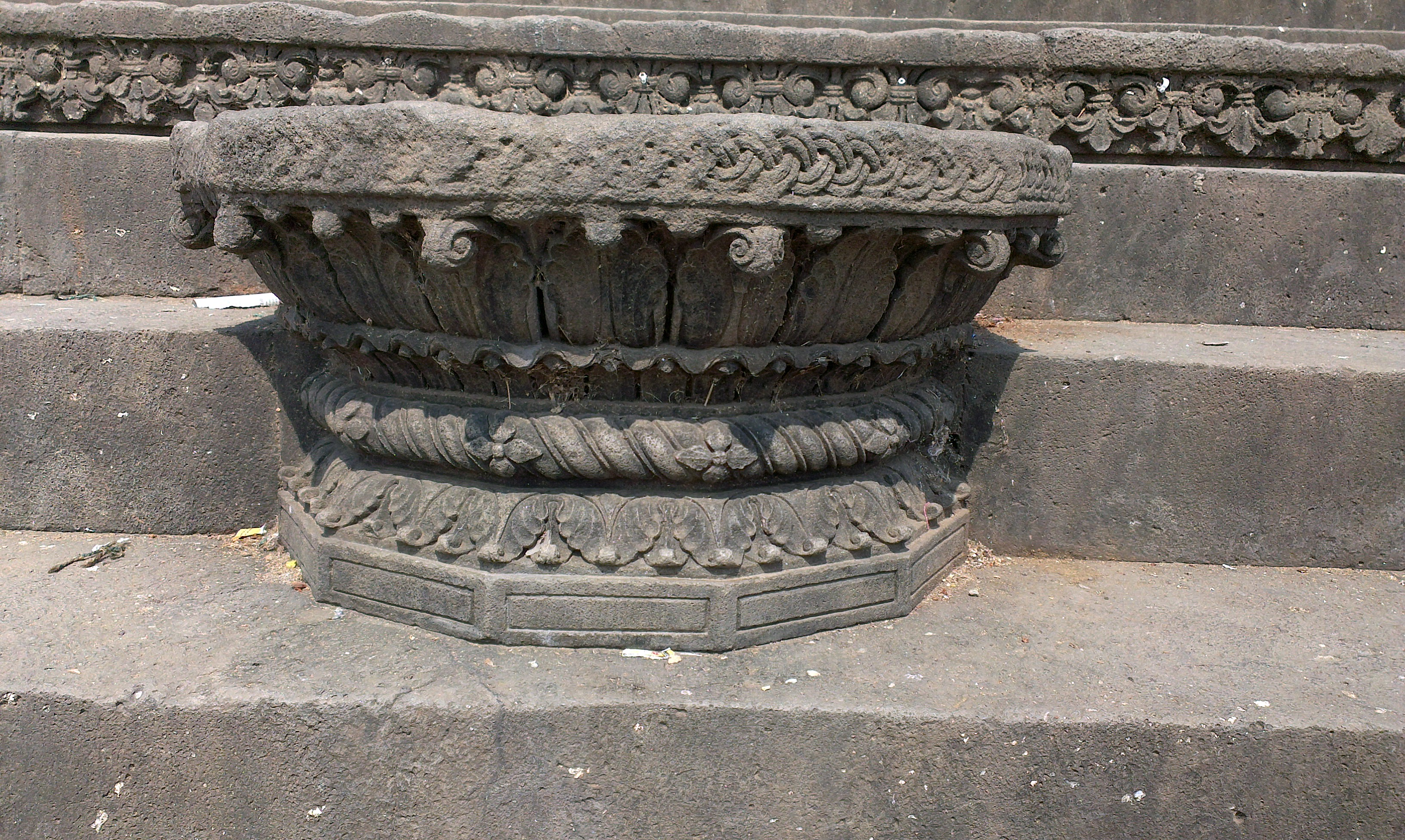
Work at Maheshwar fort

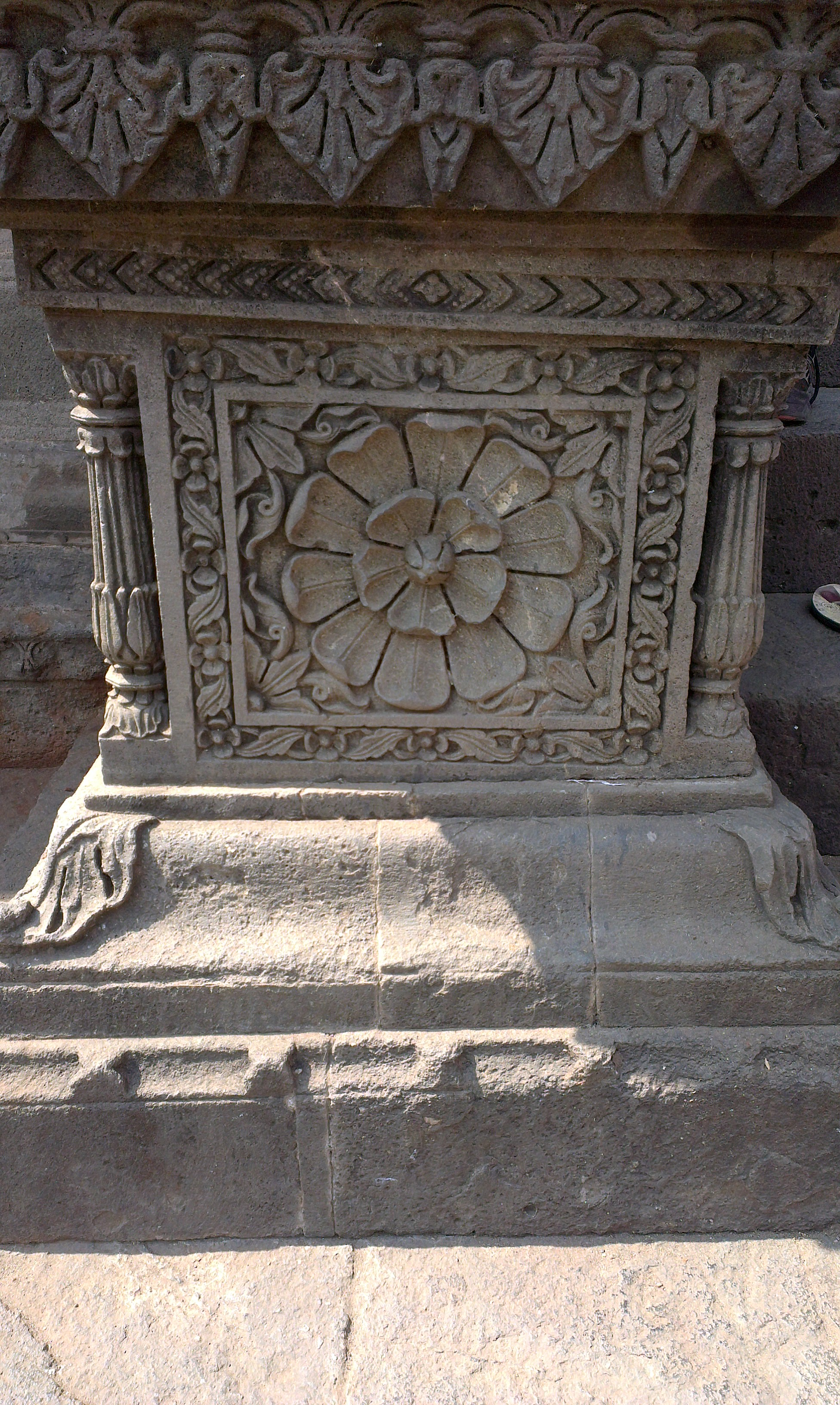
ArtWork at Maheshwari fort

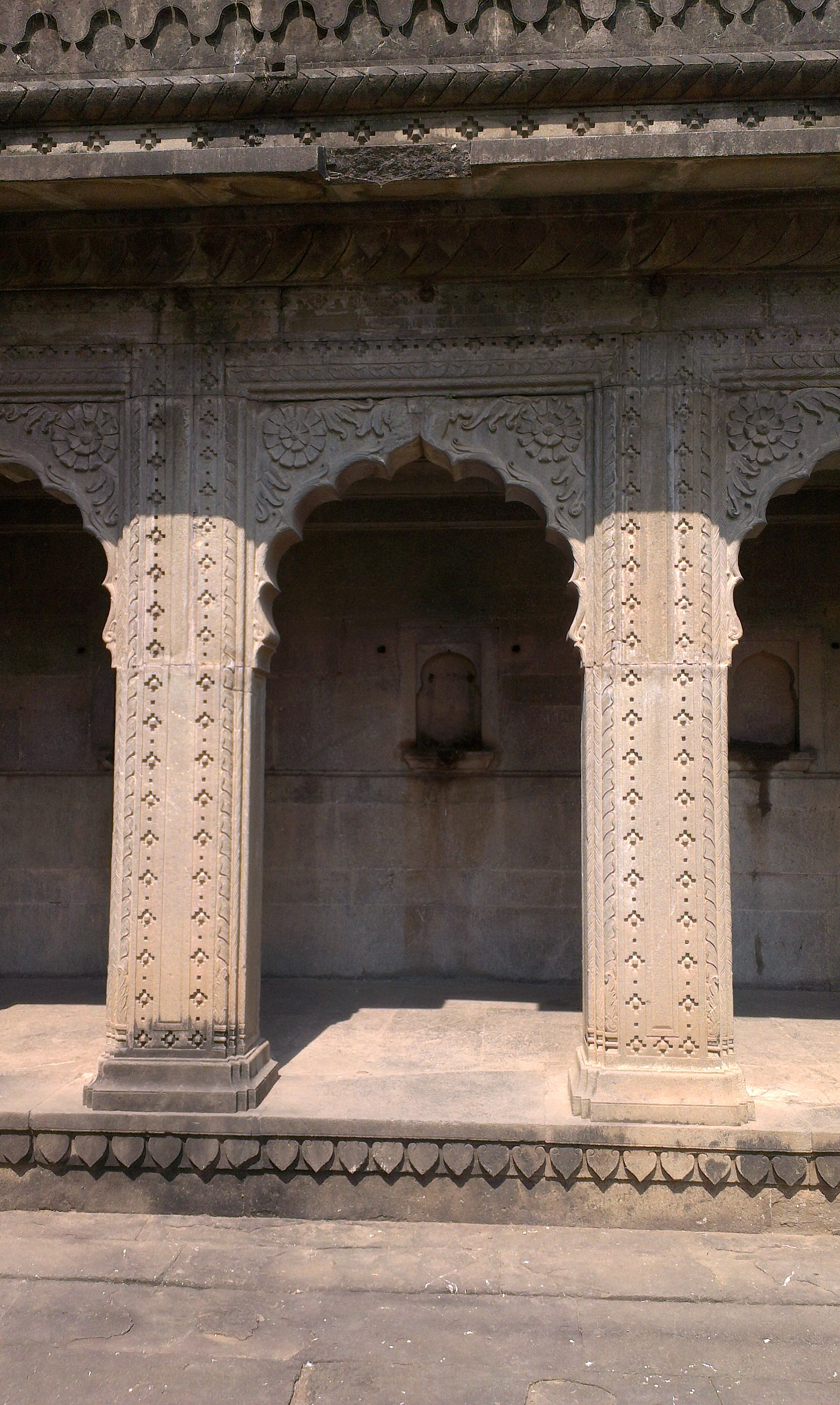
Fort of Maheshwar

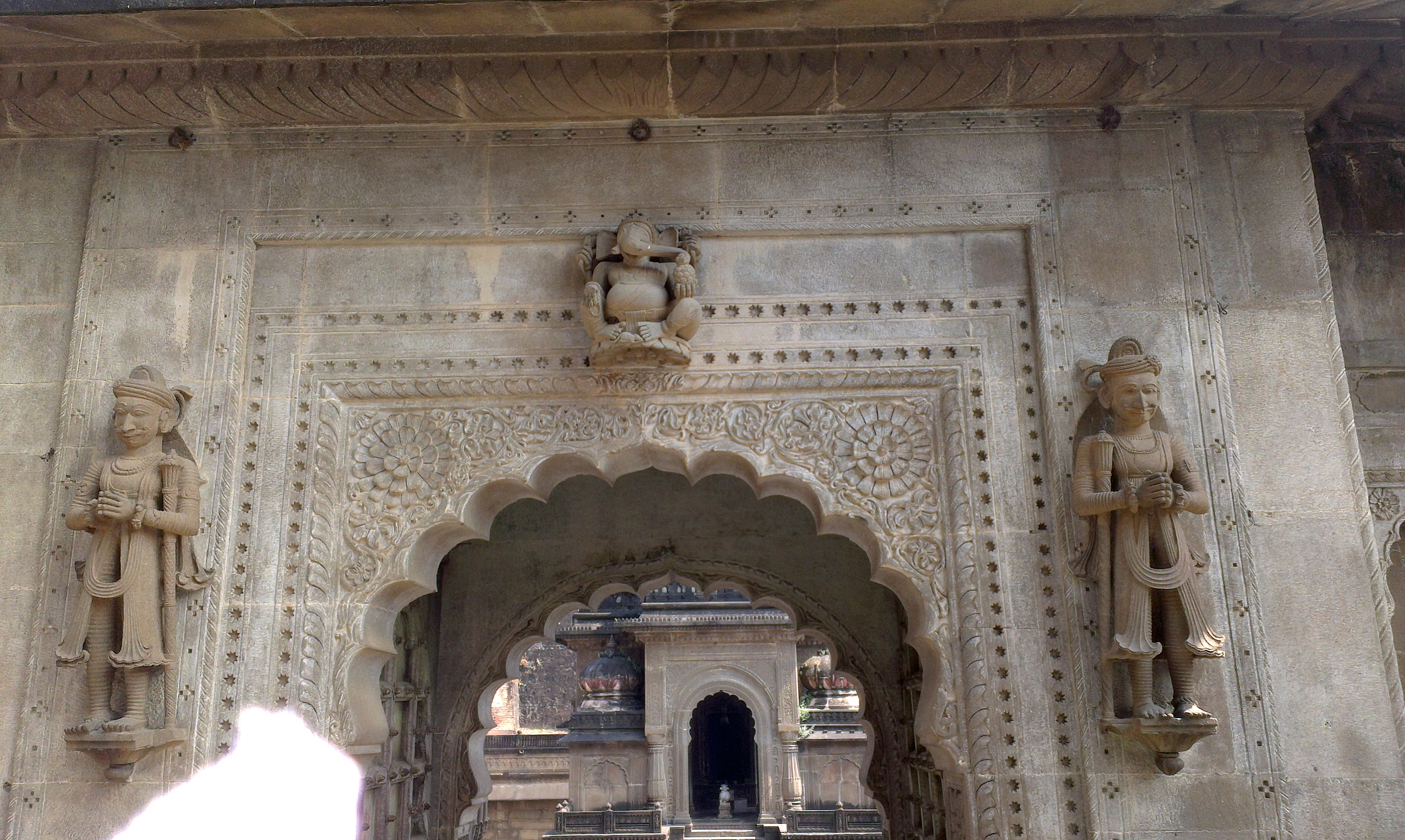
Fort of Maheshwar

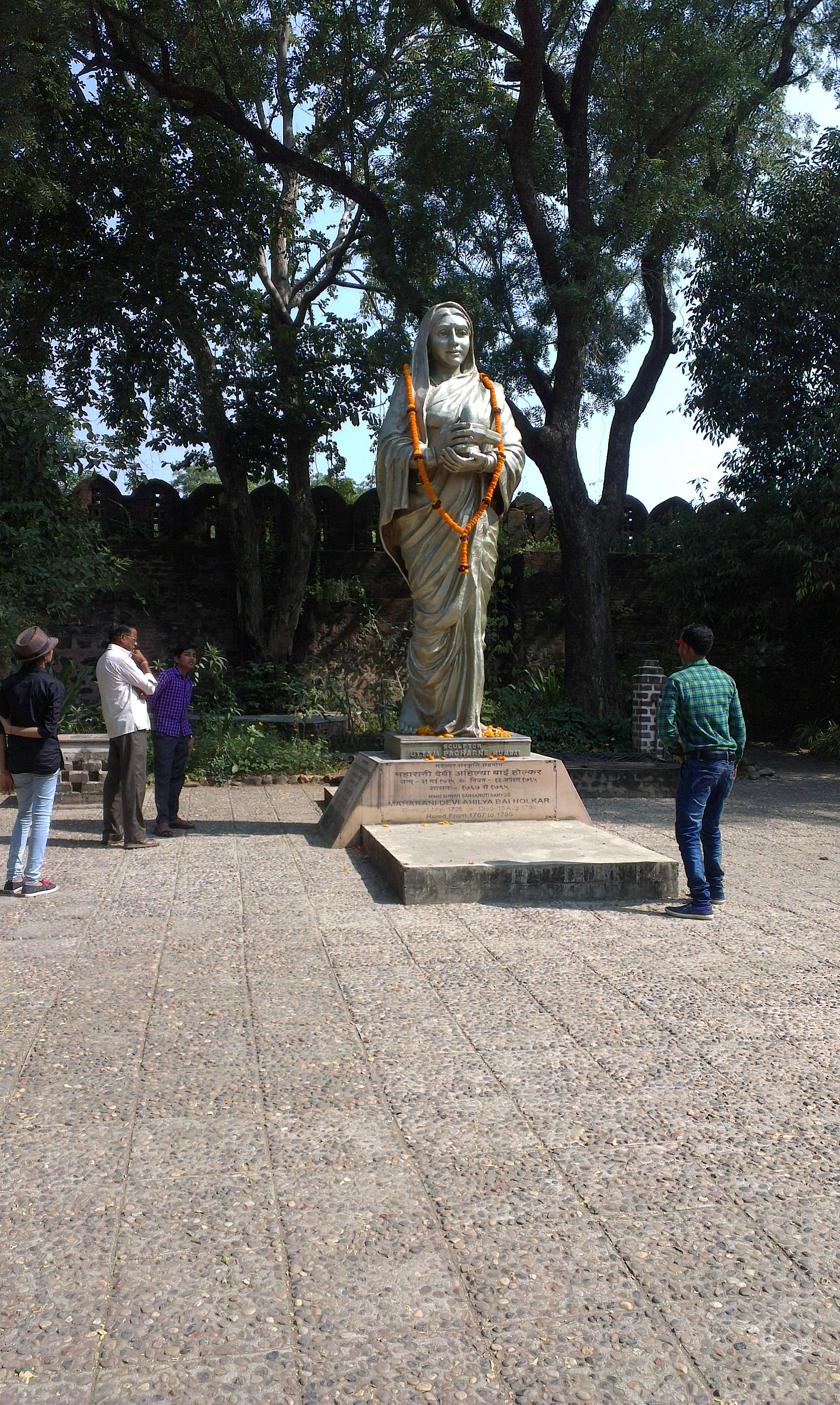
Statue of Ahilybai Holkar, Maheshwar

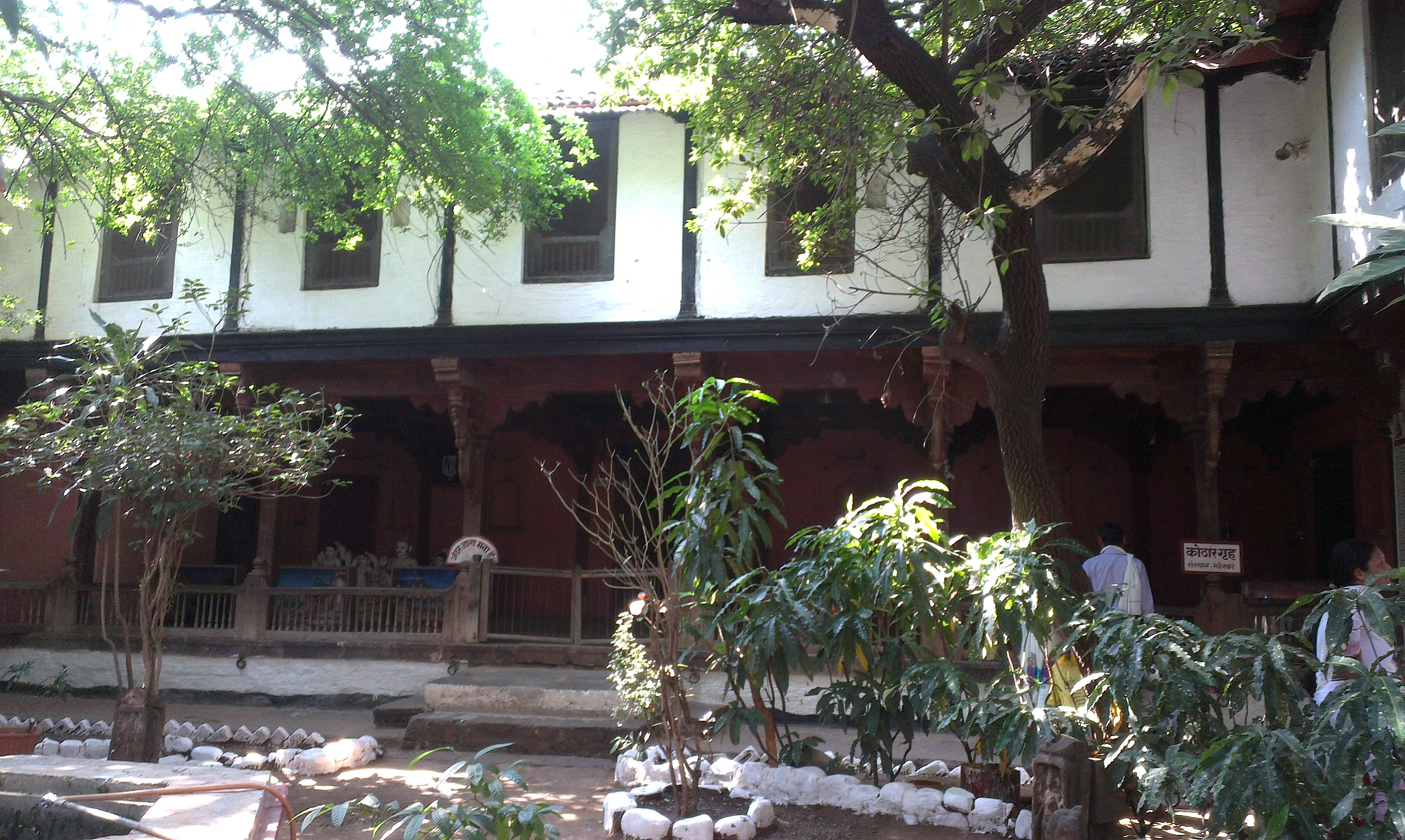
Holkar palace, Maheshwar

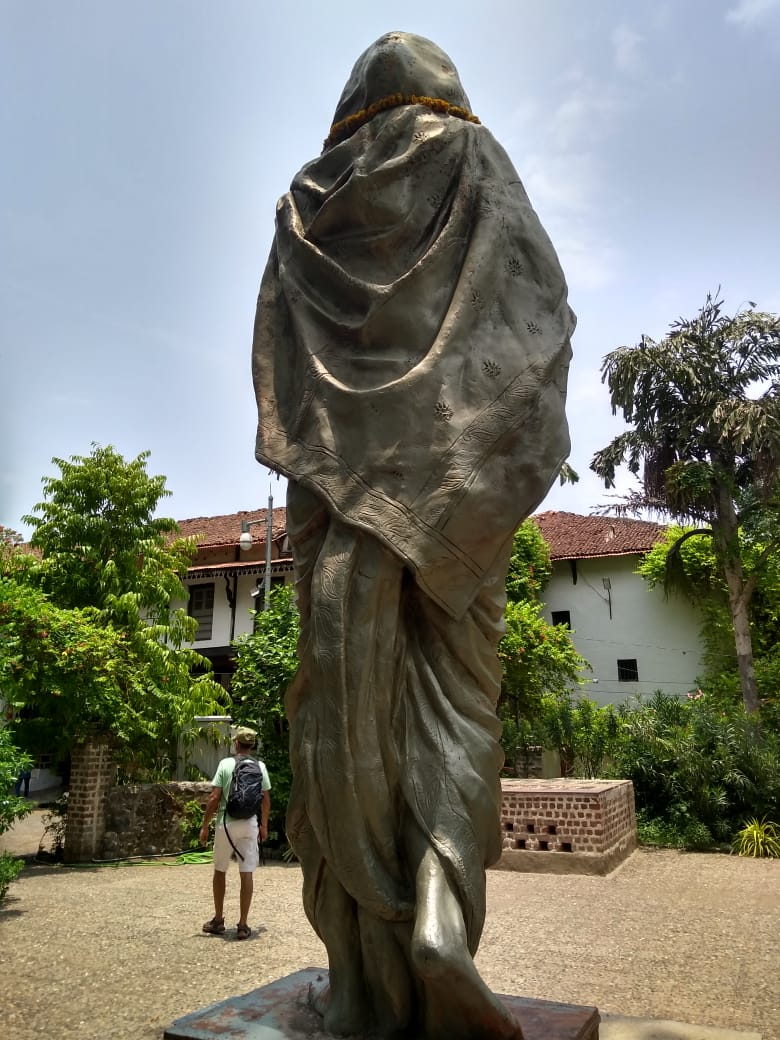

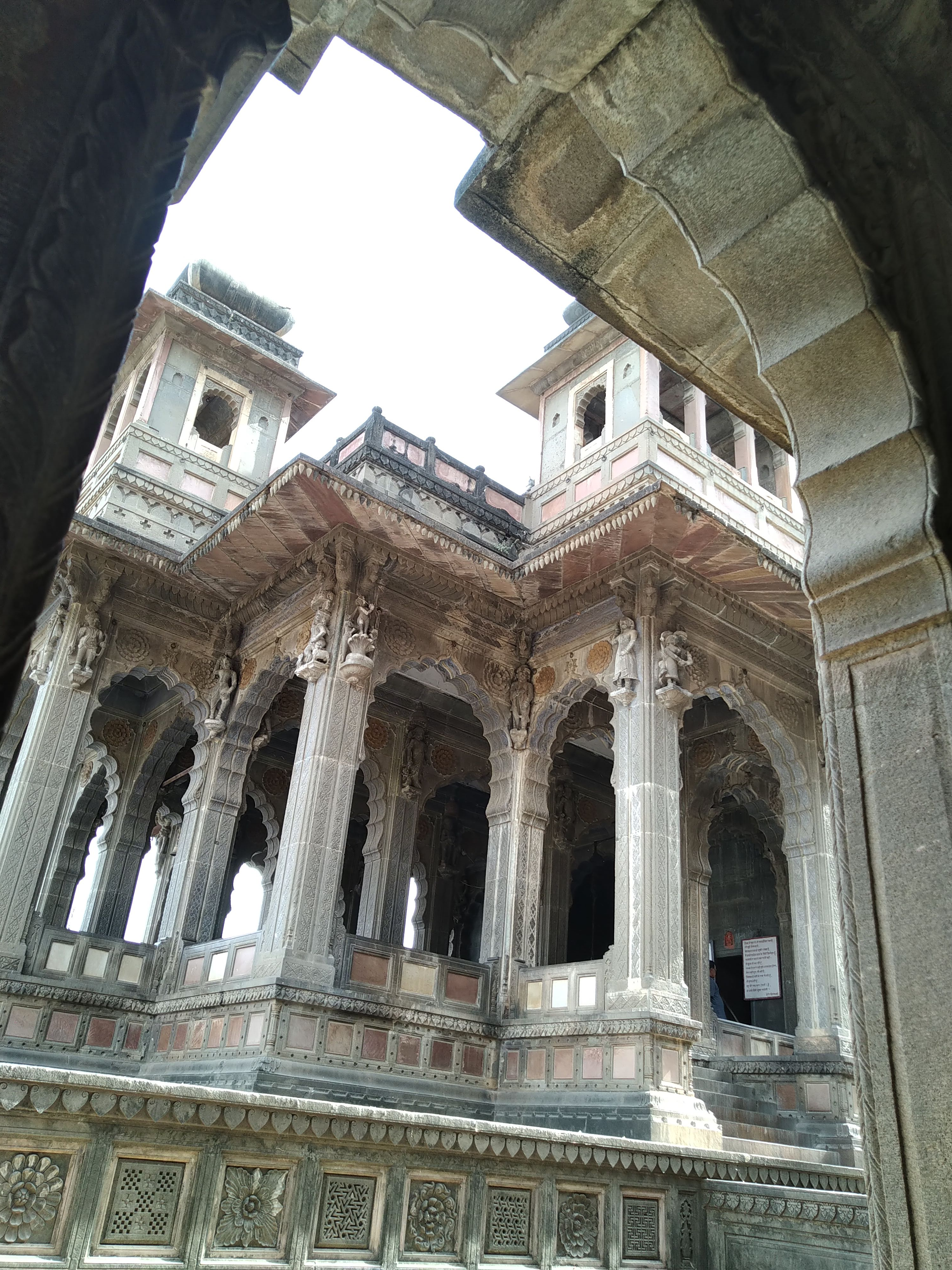
A maheswar objective

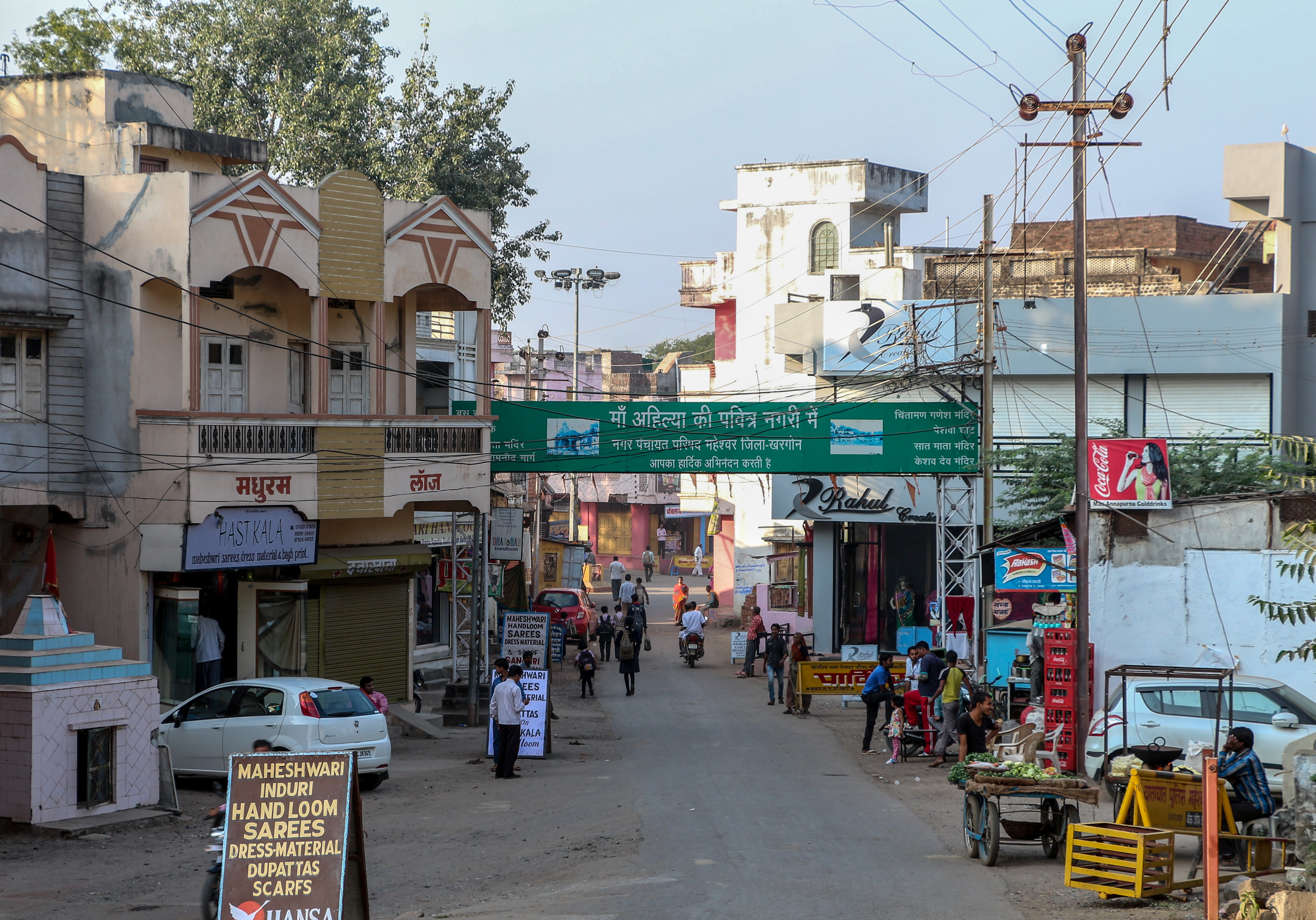
A street in Maheshwar in Khargone district (MP)

== See also ==
- Maratha Empire
- List of Maratha dynasties and states
- Indore State
- Holkar
- Mardana, Madhya Pradesh
- Narmada Kothi (Maharajah of Indore Retreat Palace), Barwaha

== Transport ==
The nearest airport is Indore. Airport Name Is Devi Ahilya Bai Holkar Airport.
