= North Indian cuisine =

Culinary traditions of Northern India

Map of North India

North Indian cuisine is collectively the cuisine of North India, which includes the cuisines of Jammu and Kashmir, Punjab, Haryana, Himachal Pradesh, Rajasthan, Uttarakhand, Delhi, and Uttar Pradesh.

Sub-types of North Indian cuisine include:

- Awadhi cuisine
- Bhojpuri cuisine
- Cuisine of Bihar
- Braj cuisine
- Chhattisgarhi cuisine
- Dogri cuisine
- Haryanvi cuisine
- Kashmiri cuisine
- Kumaoni cuisine
- Malvani cuisine
- Mughlai cuisine
- Punjabi cuisine
- Rajasthani cuisine
- Saraswat cuisine
- Sindhi cuisine
- Cuisine of Uttarakhand
- Cuisine of Uttar Pradesh

North Indian cuisine has some Central Asian influences introduced during Mughal Empire compared to its southern and eastern counterparts in the subcontinent.
