= Panwar (disambiguation) =

Panwar or Parmar is a Rajput clan found in northern India.

Panwar may also refer to:

== Dynasties ==
- Panwar dynasty (disambiguation)

== People ==
- Aalisha Panwar (born 1996), Indian television actress
- Arvind Panwar (born 1990), Indian cyclist
- Harpal Singh Panwar (born 1945), Indian politician, member of Indian Parliament (specifically Lok Sabha) and Indian government minister
- Hemendra Singh Panwar, Indian conservationist
- Krishan Lal Panwar, Indian politician, member of the Haryana Legislative Assembly and a Minister in Government of Haryana
- Lalit K. Panwar, Indian Administrative Service (IAS) officer
- Manisha Panwar, Indian politician, member of the Rajasthan Legislative Assembly
- Pritam Singh Panwar, Indian politician, member of the Uttarakhand Legislative Assembly
- Sahil Panwar (born 1999), Indian footballer
- Sangeeta Panwar (born 1969), Indian television actor
- Surendra Singh Panwar (1919–2002), Indian Army artillery officer
- Vaibhav Singh Panwar (born 1992), Indian cricketer
- Vineet Panwar (born 1998), Indian cricketer

== See also ==
- Paramara (disambiguation)
  - Paramara dynasty, during the medieval Indian period in Malwa in central India
- Powar (disambiguation)
- Poria (disambiguation)
- Powari (disambiguation)
- Parmar (disambiguation)
- Pawar (disambiguation)
- Parihar (disambiguation)
