= Kumaoni cuisine =

Culinary traditions in the Kumaon region

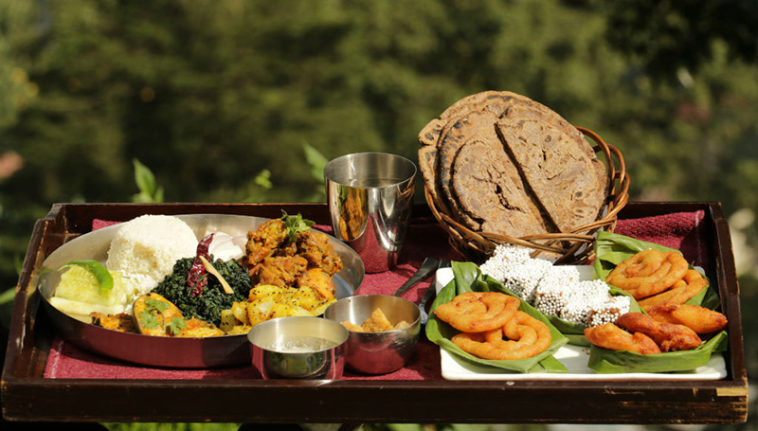
Kumaoni meal.

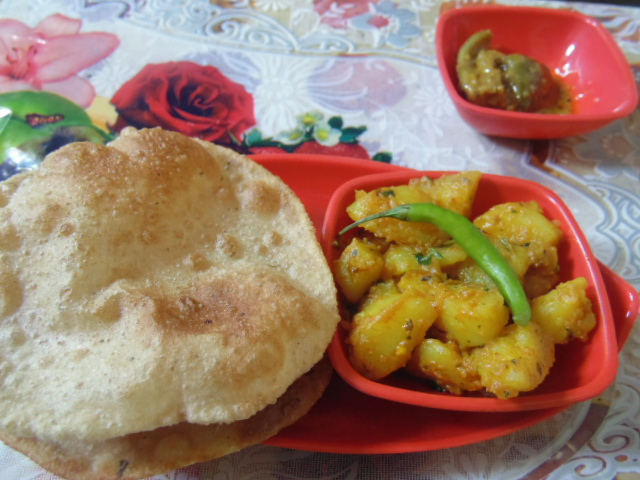
Al-Lagad (Aloo puri)

Kumauni cuisine is the culinary style of the Kumaon region of Uttarakhand, India. Kumaoni food is simple and nutritious, suited to the harsh environment of the Himalayas. Kumaoni ccuisine. It shares similarities with the cuisine of western Nepal.

Pulses like gouhat (or kulath, a local type of bean) are fashioned into different preparations like ras bhaat, chain, faanda and thatwaani. All are unique preparations from the same pulse. Chudkani and Joula made from bhatt(Black Soybean) and wheat. Jholi is a yogurt base curry with which vegetables, gram flour fritters, etc can be consumed. Nettle leaves are also widely eaten.

Popular side dishes include kumaoni raita, a cucumber and rye yogurt dish and bhang chutney which consists of hemp seeds, herbs and lemon juice. Pattod is another seasonal side dish.

Cereals like madua with rice and wheat are popular.

According to the sample registration system (SRS) baseline survey 2014 only 25.5% males and 29.2% females are vegetarian in Uttarakhand. Mutton remains the most popular protein source, possibly due to the frequent use of goats in ritual sacrifice. Consumption of chicken has also risen. Fish, hare meat, wild boar and freshwater crab meat consumption is directly tied to local availability.

Meat and chicken preparation is quite similar to the way it is prepared in most of North India, only the gravy is thinner. Bhutwa is a ppopular slow-cooked mutton/lamb offal preparation.

Jhingora Kheer, Baal Mithai, Singori, Sel, and Gugute are popular sweets from the region. The preparation of Gugute is done only on the occasion of Makar Sakranti, in which it is made in a distinctive shape and stringed into a thread to make a garland.

Several snack items, breads, dairy products and beverages form the heart of the Kumaoni cuisine which is traditionally eaten in several parts in Uttarakhand.

Tamta (specialised textures copper utensils) were used for storage and preparation of dishes.

== See also ==
- Cuisine of Uttarakhand
- Singori
- Bal Mithai
