= Pratihara (disambiguation) =

Pratihara or Pratihar may refer to these dynasties of medieval India:

- Gurjara-Pratihara dynasty
- Pratiharas of Mandavyapura

== See also ==
- Parihar (disambiguation)
