= Maheshwari saree =

Handloom textile from Madhya Pradesh, India

- Type: Sari
- Material: Silk, Cotton, and Zari

Maheshwari saree is a traditional handloom textile woven in the town of Maheshwar in Madhya Pradesh, India. Queen Ahilyabai Holkar of the Holkar dynasty commissioned weavers from South India and Surat to design and create the first Maheshwari sarees. The sarees were used by Ahilyabai as gifts for the Royal guests. The design and motifs of the Maheshwari saree incorporates architectural themes from the Ahilya Fort and the Narmada River, and includes motifs like chatai (woven mat), eent (brick), heera (diamond), and leheriya (wave). The saree is made primarily from cotton, silk, and zari.

== See also ==
- Bagh Print
- Chanderi sari
- Handloom
