= Rehwa Society =

Indian not-for-profit foundation

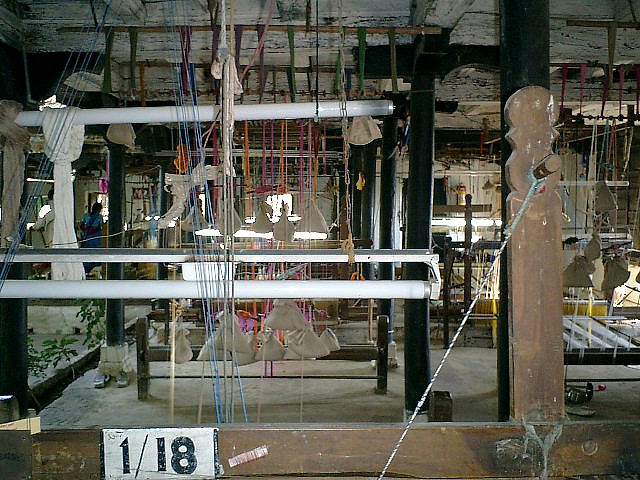
Looms at Rehwa Society, Maheshwari handloom sarees, Maheshwar

Rehwa Society is a not-for-profit foundation, working with weavers in Maheshwar, Madhya Pradesh. Established in 1978, by Richard and Sally Holkar as a weaver's society. It is known for its Maheshwar sarees, in silk and cotton.

== History ==
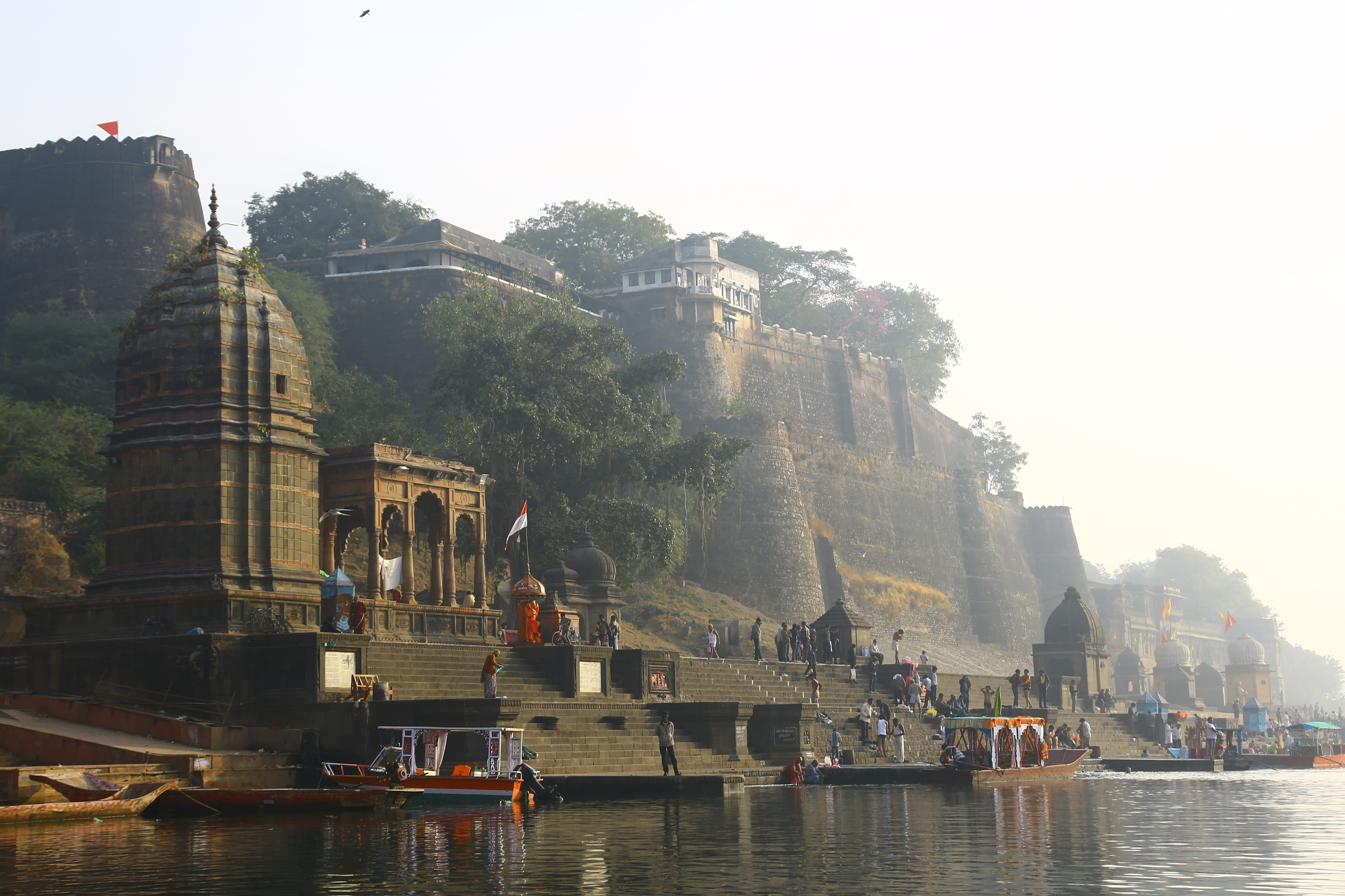
Ahilya Fort at Maheshwar, where the Rehwa Society is located

The weaving history at Maheshwar, dates back to Maharani Ahilyabai Holkar, the ruler of princely Indore State from 1765 to 1795. She brought in weavers from Surat in Gujarat and Mandu, Madhya Pradesh and established them at Maheshwar, to weave special nine-yard saris (Navvari saris) for the ladies of royal household, and turban fabric.

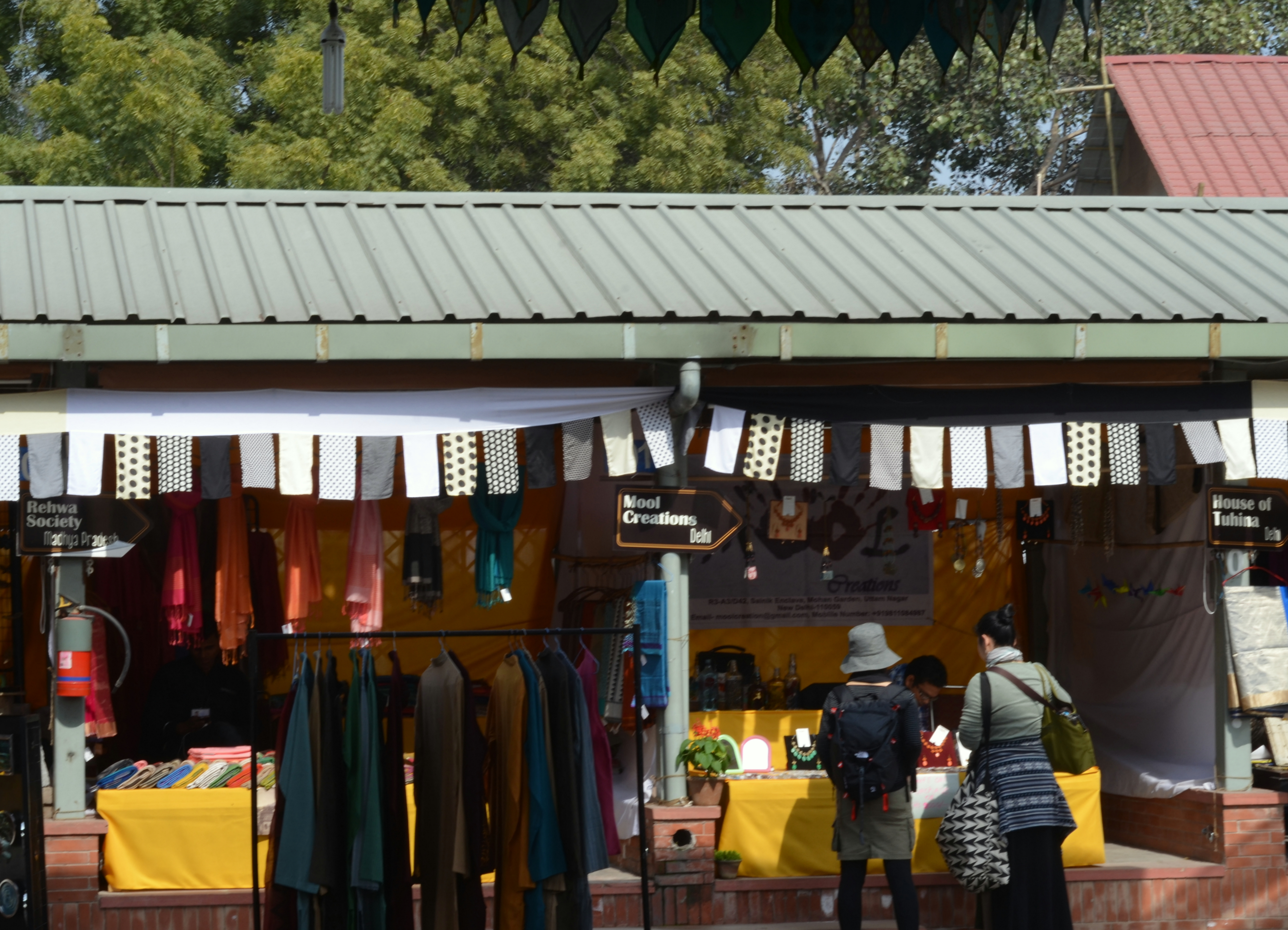
Rehwa Society outlet (left) at Dastkar Nature Bazaar, Mehrauli, Delhi

The tradition was revived, when the Rehwa Society was founded in 1978, by Richard Holkar of Holkar dynasty and his wife Sally Holkar. Using a grant from the Indian Central Welfare Board, they started with eight looms and eight women weavers from the local Meru community. It is situated within the Ahilya Fort at Maheshwar, on the banks of the Narmada River. Over the years the society has expanded to 250 weavers, most of them women and 110 looms. It is known for weaving Maheshwari sarees and fabric in cotton and silk.

Sally Holkar managed the society till 2003, when we established WomenWeave Charitable Trust, also based in Maheshwar. Thereafter, Mira Sagar who has worked with Rehwa for 20 years, remained the director of Rehwa Society, before starting her own line in 2012.

Today, Rehwa Society has retail outlets in cities like New Delhi and Mumbai, and in 2003 has a turnover of ₹1.5 crore (US$160,000). Since the society is non-profit, the profits are used in employee welfare. A small colony of 45 houses has been built for the employees, which the weavers paid through their work. Besides a school till eighth standard and a creche has also been built.

== See also ==
- Khadi
- Khādī Development and Village Industries Commission (Khadi Gramodyog)
