= Singori =

Indian sweet food

Singori (sweet)
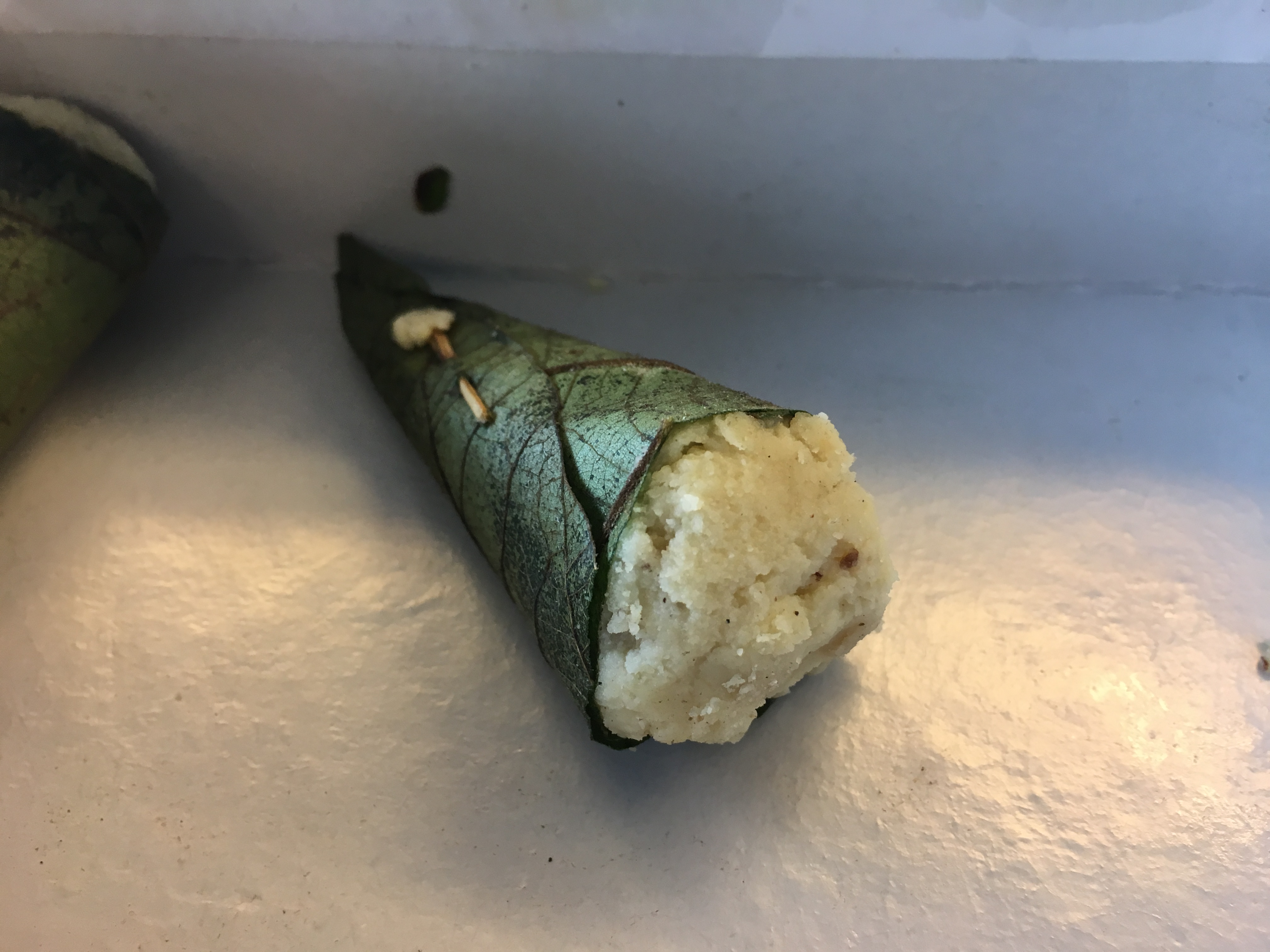
- Course: Dessert
- Place of origin: India
- Region or state: Tehri Garhwal District, Uttarakhand
- Main ingredients: Khoya, sugar, cardamom powder

Singori (सिङ्गौड़ी), also spelled Singauri, is a traditional Indian sweet historically from Tehri Garhwal and the former town of Old Tehri in Uttarakhand, while also being strongly associated with Almora and the wider Kumaon division. The sweet was a delicacy during the Panwar dynasty of Tehri Garhwal and formed part of the traditional food culture of the old Tehri region. Over time, Singori became particularly identified with Almora and Kumaon, where it continues to be regarded as a distinctive traditional confection.

Singori is traditionally prepared from sweetened khoya (reduced milk solids), shaped into a small cone and wrapped in the aromatic maalu leaf (Bauhinia variegata). The leaf wrapping gives the sweet its characteristic conical form and contributes a distinctive aroma and flavour. In preparation and texture, Singori is sometimes compared with milk-based sweets such as Kalakand, although its distinctive maalu-leaf wrapping sets it apart from similar confections.

== History ==
Although modern descriptions frequently associate Singori with Kumaon, particularly Almora, historical and literary accounts also document a longstanding association between the sweet and Tehri Garhwal. In Meri Tehri, Singori is described as one of the famous sweets of Tehri, known beyond the town and referred to in the plains as pattē vālī mithāī ("leaf-wrapped sweet"). The memoir also recalls Negi's shop as particularly renowned for its Singori.

Mohan Thapliyal, in his 2007 memoir कटोरा भर याद में डूबी टिहरी, likewise describes Singori as a famous sweet of Tehri and records its traditional preparation as khoya wrapped in malu leaves in the shape of a chilam (smoking pipe).

Retrospective accounts of Old Tehri similarly remember Singori as a traditional sweet of the Garhwal region, sold wrapped in green leaves. An academic study of Uttarakhand food traditions published in 2015 also identifies Singori as a traditional milk-based sweet particularly associated with both Almora and Tehri Garhwal.
