= Poria =

Poria or Poriya may refer to:

== Names ==
- Poria may refer to a branch or surname of Jethwa.

== Places ==
- On Poriya Ridge in northern Israel:
  - Poriya Hospital, common name of medical centre with various official names
  - Poria Illit, communal settlement (village)
  - Poria – Kfar Avoda, formerly Poria, communal settlement (village)
  - Poria – Neve Oved, communal settlement (village)

== Biology ==
- Poria (fungus), a defunct fungal genus subsumed into Perenniporia
- Wolfiporia, a genus of fungi in the family Polyporaceae, particularly Wolfiporia extensa, called poria in the context of Chinese medicine
- Poria (beetle), a genus of beetles in the family Coccinellidae
- Poria (crustacean) (Lang, 1965), a genus in the family Canthocamptidae

== See also ==
- Kākā poria, a small leg ring for parrots made from bone or stone
- Panwar (disambiguation)
