= Parihar =

Parihar may refer to:

- Parihar (clan), a clan of India
- Parihar (surname), a Nepali and Indian surname
- Parihar Assembly constituency, in the Sitamarhi district, Bihar, India
- 16174 Parihar, a main-belt asteroid

== See also ==
- Parihara, a village in Rajasthan, India
- Pratihara (disambiguation)
- Paramara (disambiguation)
- Parmar (disambiguation)
- Panwar (disambiguation)
- Pawar (disambiguation)
