= Parmar =

Parmar may refer to:

- Parmar (clan), Rajput clan in India
- Parmar (surname), an Indian surname

== See also ==
- Paramara (disambiguation)
- Panwar (disambiguation)
- Parihar (disambiguation)
- Pawar (disambiguation)
- Paramara dynasty, during the medieval Indian period in Malwa in central India
