= Pawar (disambiguation) =

Pawar is an Indian clan and surname found among the Maratha caste in western India.

Pawar may also refer to:

- Parmar (Rajput clan) or Pawar, a Rajput clan of northern India
- Pawar (Banjara clan), a clan of the Banjara people of India

== See also ==
- Paramara (disambiguation)
- Parmar (disambiguation)
- Panwar (disambiguation)
- Powar (disambiguation)
- Powari (disambiguation)
- Parihar (disambiguation)
