= Powari =

Powari may refer to:

- pertaining to the Powar, a Hindu agricultural caste in central India
  - Powari language, their Indo-Aryan language

== See also ==
- Powar (disambiguation)
- Pawar (disambiguation)
- Panwar (disambiguation)
