= Oon Bujurg =

Coordinates: 21.822°N 75.456°E

Oon (otherwise Un Buzurg; Hindi उन्बुजुर्ग) is a small town in the Khargone district of Madhya Pradesh, located 18 km directly to the west of Khargone.

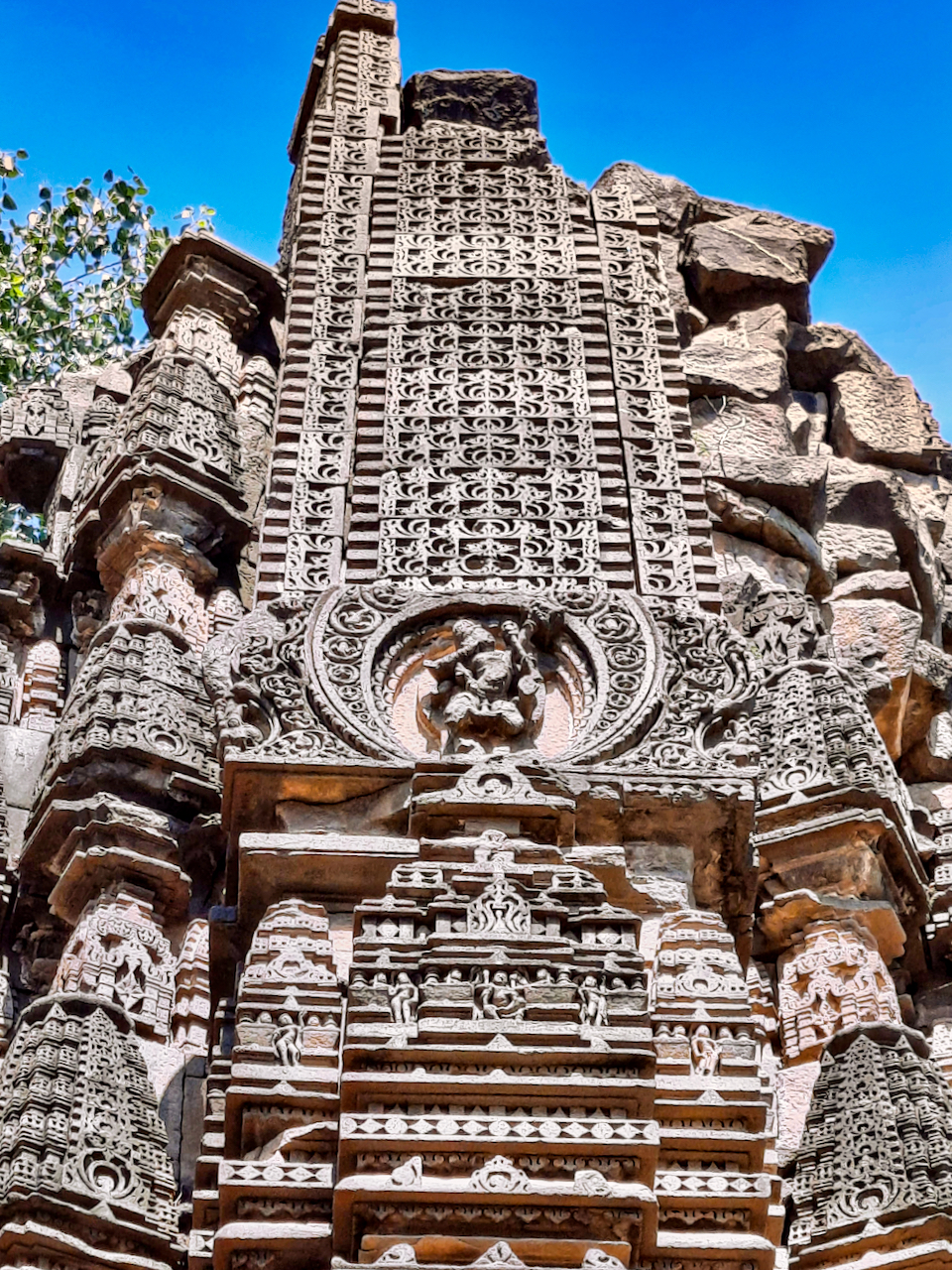
Nīlakaṇṭheśvara temple at Oon, detail of central spine on the spire, a key feature of the Bhumija style.

The town is best known for a series of late medieval temples of the Paramara period, many of them protected monuments under the Archaeological Survey of India. The temples are largely dedicated to Śiva, but there are also a number of famous Jain temples.

Most of the temples are in the Bhumija temple style of Malwa, but the temple of Śantinātha outside of the town to the south is in the multi-turreted śekharī mode and shows the influence of building traditions in Gujarat.

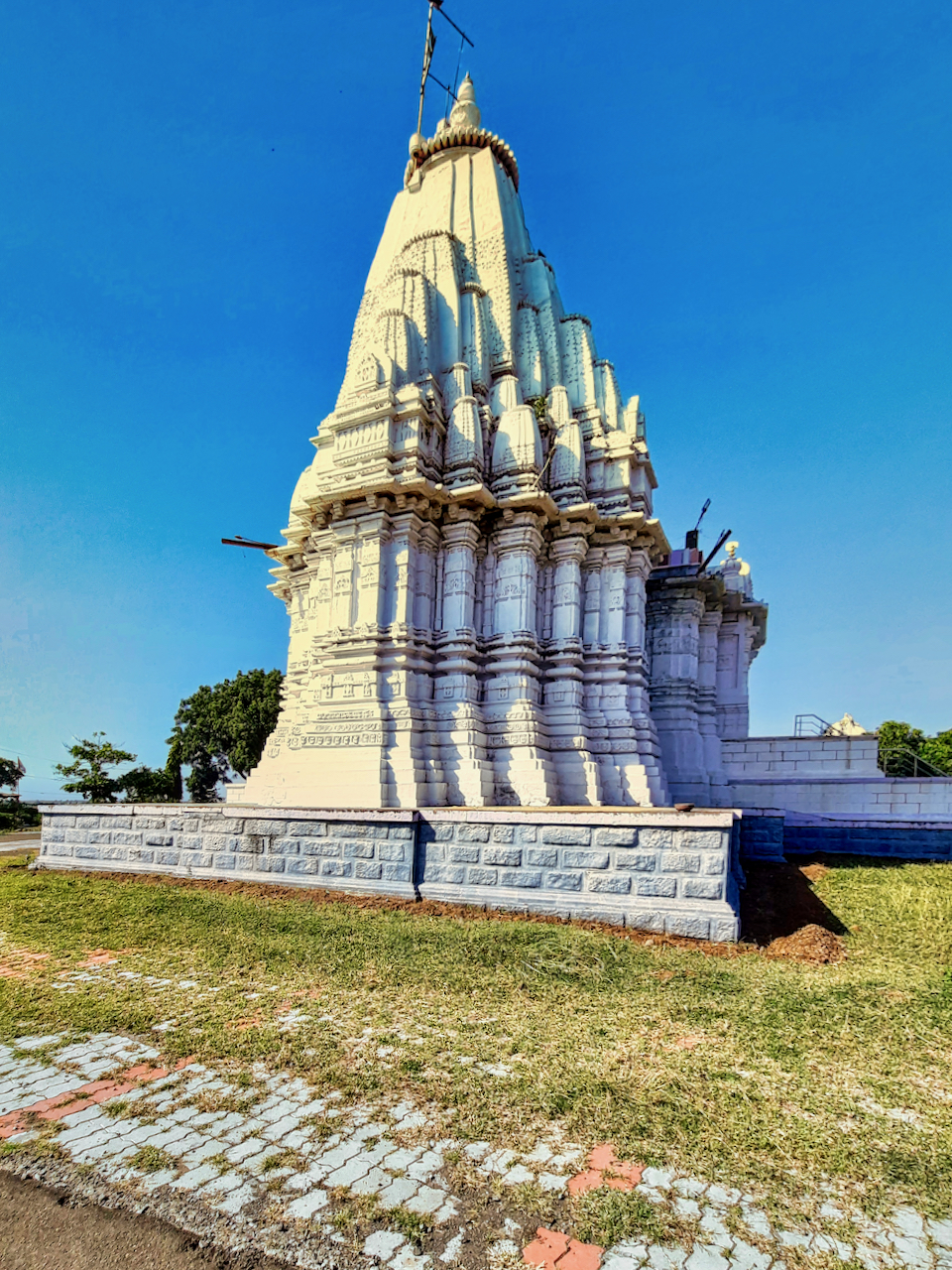
Śāntinātha Jain Temple at Oon.

The temples at Oon frequently feature in surveys of Indian temple architecture, with a dedicated study prepared by S. M. Adhikari.
