= Powar =

Powar or Ponwar may refer to:

- Powar, a Hindu agricultural caste in central India in the states of Madhya Pradesh and Maharashtra, speakers of the Powari language
- Parmar (clan), a Rajput clan found in northern India
- Ponwar, a place in Puranpur tehsil in Pilibhit district of Uttar Pradesh, India
  - Ponwar cattle, a breed of cattle from Ponwar, Uttar Pradesh, India

== See also ==
- Powari (disambiguation)
- Pawar (disambiguation)
- Panwar (disambiguation)
