= Bandheri =

- Town
- Location in Madhya Pradesh, India
- Coordinates: 22°37′0″N 75°7′0″E
- Country: India
- State: Madhya Pradesh
- District: Dhar
- Elevation: 557 m (1,827 ft)

Languages
  - Official: Hindi
- Time zone: UTC+5:30 (IST)
- ISO 3166 code: IN-MP
- Vehicle registration: MP
- Coastline: 0 kilometres (0 mi)
- Nearest city: Dhar

Bandheri is a town, near Dhar city in Dhar district of Madhya Pradesh, India.

== Geography ==
It is located at 22°37′0″N 75°7′0″E at an elevation of 557m.

== Location ==
National Highway 59 passes through Bandheri. It is at a distance of 25 km from Dhar. The nearest airport is Devi Ahilyabai Holkar Airport at Indore.

== Places of interest ==
- Sardarpur Sanctuary
- Darwazas
- Bagh Caves
- Bagh Print
