= Uttarakhandi cuisine =

Cuisine of Uttarakhand state

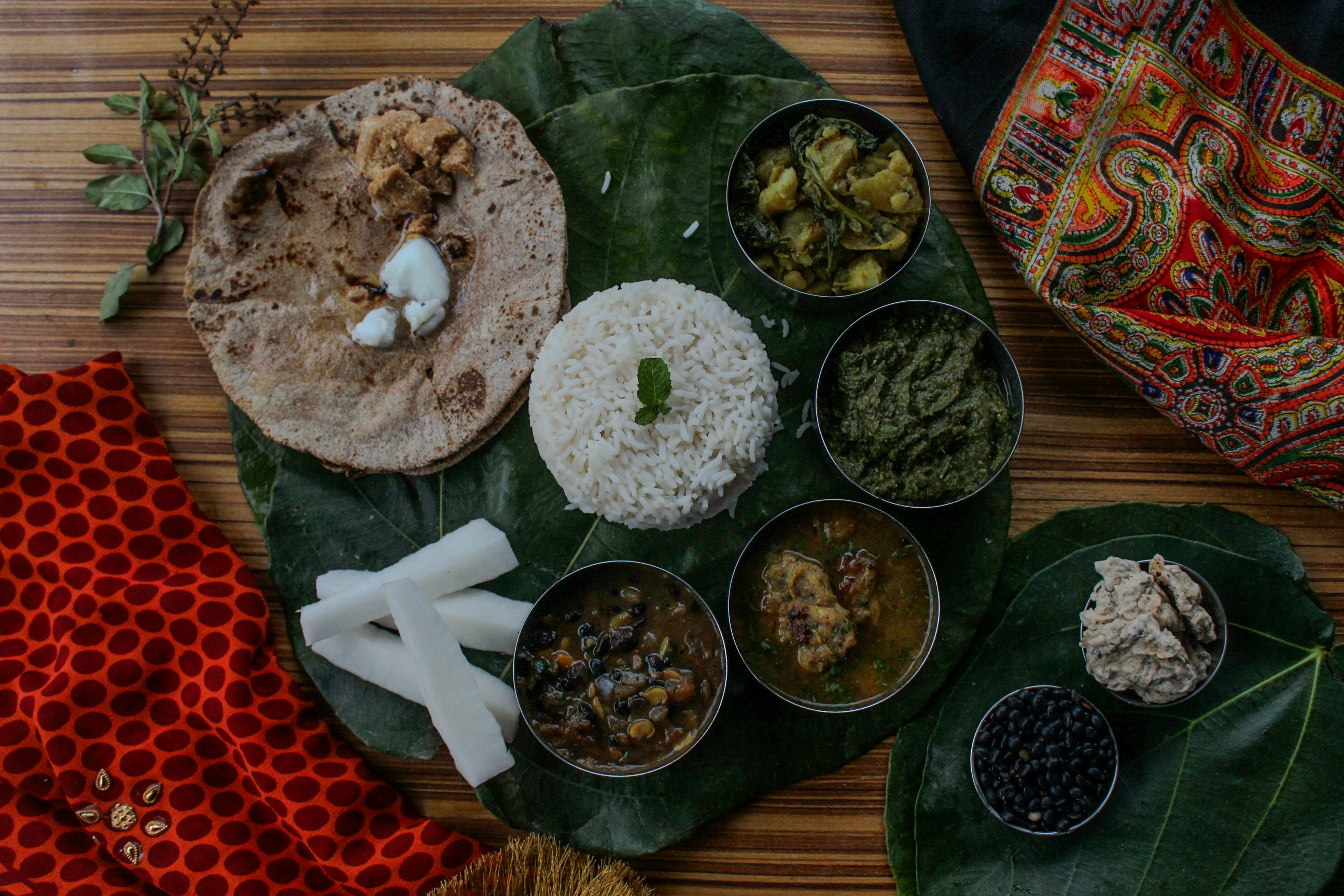
A thali of Uttarakhand cuisine

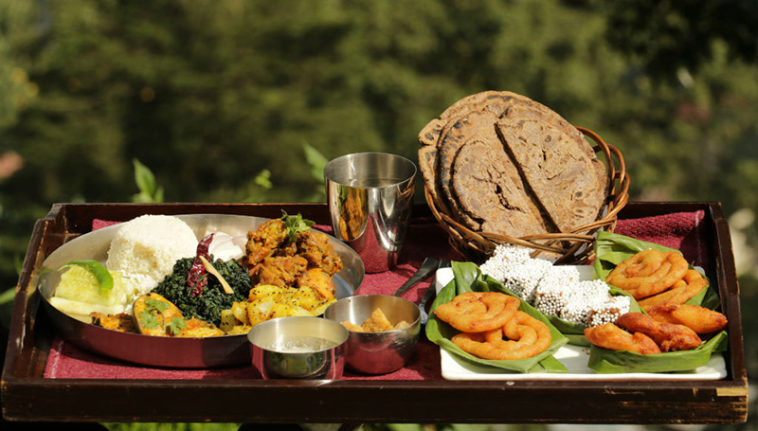
Traditional Kumaoni Thaali.

Cuisines of Uttarakhand state are simple and made of locally grown ingredients. The cuisines don't have complex spices. The two regions in Uttarakhand have different cuisines, the Garhwali Cuisines and the Kumaoni cuisines. Some popular dishes of Uttarakhand cuisine are:

- Rabri (that made with Jhongora (shyama ka chawal) & Chaas (butter milk) adding leaves of Radish.)
- Khadi or jhwāi (made with Curd or buttermilk)
- Arsa (made with rice and jaggery)
- Gulthiya (made with normal atta & pure desi Ghee)
- Garhwal ka Fannah
- Muspani(Grounded urad)
- Dhapadi(Spinach soup)
- Stuffed Gahat Chapatis
- Gahat (Kulath)
- Rasmi Badi (Kofta)
- Bhang Ki Chutney
- Chainsoo
- Kafuli
- Kandali ku saag
- Urad Ke Pakore (Wada)
- Aloo Ke Gutke
- Rotna

== See also ==
- Thechwani
