= Panwar dynasty =

Panwar dynasty may refer to the dynasties in India related to Panwar tribe:

- Paramara dynasty in Malwa, Ujjain, Dhar (9th century−1305)
- Panwar dynasty of Garhwal Kingdom (822−1949)
- Panwar Kingdom, or Panwar dynasty (1785–1800) in Chhatarpur District, Madhya Pradesh

== See also ==
- Panwar (disambiguation)
