= Lalit K. Panwar =

Indian Administrative Service Officer

Vice-Chancellor of the Rajasthan ILD Skill University (RISL)
- Incumbent
- Assumed office 13 July 2017

Chairman of the Rajasthan Public Service Commission
- In office 11 August 2015 – 11 July 2017

Tourism Secretary, Government of India
- In office 29 October 2014 – 31 July 2015
- Preceded by: Parvez Dewan
- Succeeded by: Vinod Zutshi

Personal details
- Born: 11 July 1955 (age 70) Balotra, Rajasthan
- Occupation: IAS Officer

Dr. Lalit K. Panwar is an Indian Administrative Service (IAS) officer. He is a former chairman of Rajasthan Public Service Commission and former Secretary of Ministry of Tourism and Minority Affairs in Government of India.
