= Paramara =

Paramara may refer to:

- Paramara dynasty, Indian dynasty
- Paramaras of Chandravati, 10th-13th century dynasty of Rajasthan, India
- Paramaras of Siwana, another dynasty in Rajasthan

== See also ==
- Parmar (disambiguation)
- Panwar (disambiguation)
- Pawar (disambiguation)
- Parihar (disambiguation)
