= Chirakhan =

- Village
- Location in Madhya Pradesh Chirakhan (India)
- Coordinates: 22.1246941°N 76.4401354°E
- Country: India
- State: Madhya Pradesh
- Lok Sabha Constituency: Khandwa (Lok Sabha constituency)
- Vidhan Sabha Constituency: Mandhata (Vidhan Sabha constituency)
- District: Khandwa district
- Region: Nimar
- Tehsil: Punasa
- Establishment: 8th October 1818 (Navami Tithi of Shardiya Navratri in the Shukla Paksha of the Ashwin month of the Hindu calendar)
- Founded by: Joraji Singh Badal (Badaliya-Panwar)

Government
  - Type: Panchayat Raj
  - Body: Gram Panchayat
  - M.L.A: Narayan Patel, (BJP)
  - M.P.: Gyaneswar Patil, (BJP)
  - Sarpanch: Rekhabai Ranjit Rathore
  - Panchayat Name: Utawad

Population (2011)
  - Village: 641

Languages
  - Official: Hindi
  - Regional: Nimadi, (Dialect of Hindi)
- Time zone: UTC+5:30 (IST)
- Postal code: 450112
- Climate: Cwa / Aw (Köppen)
- Precipitation: 945 mm (37.2 in)
- Avg. annual temperature: 24.0 °C (75.2 °F)
- Avg. summer temperature: 31 °C (88 °F)
- Avg. winter temperature: 17 °C (63 °F)
- Website: khandwa.nic.in

Chirakhan is a village of the Punasa tehsil of Khandwa district, in Madhya Pradesh state, India. Village is founded by Joraji Singh Badal (Badaliya - Panwar). On 8 October 1818 on Navami Tithi of Shardiya Navratri in the Shukla Paksha of the Ashwin month, two villages Chirakhan and Chirakhan were established together. They were bought from the British Raj by the founder. Presently most of the people of the village depend on agriculture, workers and youth are dependent on the nearby city of Mundi and Shree Singaji Thermal Power Project for employment.

== Geography ==
Chirakhan is 130 km (81 mi) away from Indore, the commercial capital of the state, and 220 kilometres (140 mi) from Bhopal, the state capital. Additionally, it is 40 kilometres (25 mi) north of the headquarters of Khandwa district, 18 kilometres (11 mi) from tehsil headquarters Punasa, 9 kilometres (5.6 mi) from Mundi, and 16 kilometres (9.9 mi) from Hanuwantiya.

== History ==
Chirakhan Village was founded by Joraji Singh Badal (Badaliya Panwar). On 8 October 1818 on Navami Tithi, two villages Chirakhan and Chirakhan were established together. because according to astrology in India, the foundation day of most villages is celebrated on the Navami Tithi of Shardiya Navratri in the Shukla Paksha of the Ashwin month of the Hindu calendar, and in 1818, the Navami Tithi was October 8.

The founders of the village belonged to the Paramara dynasty, which ruled much of western India from the 8th to the 14th centuries. After the end of the rule of the Paramara dynasty, their descendants and relatives settled in the Malwa Nimar region and established many small forts, towns, and villages there.

Dhodwara village was one of the places settled after the 14th century by the people of the Parmar dynasty, where he was known as Agnivansh Kshatriya Rajput. Badaliya Panwar

In the year 1818, when the Marathas handed over the rule of the Nimar region to the British Raj, the Zamidar of Dhodwara village, Joraji Singh Badal, son of Kunwarji Panwar, purchased the land from the British and established the villages of Chirakhan and Chirakhan. And people of different castes were brought there from different villages and were given free space for houses and farming. Presently the descendants of the founding family are known as Badal, Panwar and Patel.

Parmar or Panwar was an Agnivansha Kshatriya dynasty of medieval India. The authority of this dynasty was up to the states of Dhar, Malwa, Nimar, Ujjayini, Abu Parbat, and Amarkot near Indus. Nearly all of Western India was a kingdom of the Paramara dynasty. They continued to rule from the 8th century to the 14th century. The root word has different abrasions according to the area of Pramar such as Panwar, Pawar, Powar, Puwar, Punwar, Bhoyar Pawar and Puar.

Before independence, the head of this village was the Badal family. After independence, the Zamindari system was abolished, and the village came to be ruled by government officials. In 1992, villages in India began to be governed by the Panchayati Raj system, and currently the head of the village is a Sarpanch.

== Landmarks ==
- Mata Mandir Chirakhan
- Shiv Mandir Chirakhan
- Hanuman Mandir Chirakhan
- Bhilat Dev Mandir Chirakhan

== Education ==
=== Colleges ===
- Govt. I.T.I College Mundi
- Lions College Mundi
- Government Degree College Mundi

=== Schools ===
- Govt. Primary School Chirakhan
- Govt. Middle School Chirakhan
- Govt. Boy's Higher Sec. School Mundi
- Govt. Girls Higher Sec. School Mundi
- St. Mary's Convent High School Mundi
- Janpad Hr. Sec. School Mundi
- Sant Singaji Higher Secondary School Mundi
- Lions Hr. Sec. School Mundi
- Aasha Devi Public School Mundi
- Saraswati Vidya Mandir Mundi
- Model Public School Mundi
- Sanskar Public School Mundi
- Saraswati Shishu Vidya Mandir Mundi
- Rewottama International School Chirakhan Road Mundi

== Health ==
- Government Hospital Mundi
- Gupta Nurshing Home Mundi
- Charak Hospital Mundi

== Transport ==
Chirakhan is connected to SH-41 (Khandwa–Mundi–Ashta State Highway) and SH-41A (Omkareshwer–Nagar–Punasa State Highway); it is linked to Indore, Khandwa, Bhopal, Burhanpur, Nagpur and others. Indian Railways started a Khandwa–Bir passenger route to connect Khandwa Junction to Chirakhan. More than two hundred buses operate and provide road connectivity to major cities of the state. The local transport system includes minibuses, and tempos provide connectivity to more than forty nearby villages.
