= Chhaigaon Makhan =

Town in Khandwa, Madhya Pradesh, India

- Town
- Location in Madhya Pradesh, India
- Coordinates: 21.83°N 76.21°E
- Country: India
- State: Madhya Pradesh
- District: Khandwa District
- Elevation: 309 m (1,014 ft)

Population
  - Total: 5,741

Languages
  - Official: Hindi
- PIN: 450771
- Vehicle registration: MP 12

Chhaigaon Makhan is a town and a tehsil headquarters in Khandwa District of the Indian state of Madhya Pradesh. The town is also a Development Block.

== Geography ==
It is about 15 km from Khandwa. It belongs to the Indore Division. Chhaigaon Makhan is 15 km away from Khandwa, 70 km away from Khargone and 115 km away from Indore. Nearby cities include Khandwa, Mandhata, Punasa, Pandhana, Mundi, Sanawad, Barwaha and Khargone.

== Demographics ==
As per Census of India 2011, Chhaigaon Makhan has a population of 5,741 of which 2,847 are males while 2,894 are females.

People mostly use Hindi and Nimadi languages.

== Administration ==
Chhaigaon Makhan is a tehsil headquarters and a Development Block, it includes about 44 gram panchayats. The town includes a police station and several bank services are available.

== Education ==
Educational institutions include Government College, Chhaigaon, and a Government Boys and Government Girls schools. Dr. C.V. Raman University, is a private institute nearby.

== Transport ==
The town is connected to nearby major cities with a bus service.
