= Khalwa, Madhya Pradesh =

Town in Madhya Pradesh, India

Khalwa
- Town
- Location in Madhya Pradesh, India
- Coordinates: 21.80°N 76.74°E
- Country: India
- State: Madhya Pradesh
- District: Khandwa
- Elevation: 309 m (1,014 ft)

Population (2011)
  - Total: 7,612

Languages
  - Official: Hindi
- Time zone: UTC+5:30 (IST)
- ISO 3166 code: IN-MP
- Vehicle registration: MP

Khalwa is a town and a Tehsil Headquarter in Khandwa District of Madhya Pradesh. Khalwa is a tribal dominated area of Madhya Pradesh. Khalwa is located 50 km away from Khandwa on the bank of a manjri named small river.

== Geography ==
Khalwa is located on 21.80°N 76.74°E. It has an average elevation of 309 metres (1014 feet).

=== Climate ===
The yearly average rainfall of the Town is 668.2 mm. The maximum temperature reaches up to 48 °C and the minimum temperature goes down to 1 °C.

== Demographics ==
Khalawa town has population of 7,612 of which 4,002 are males while 3,610 are females as per the 2011 Census.

=== Spoken languages ===
Hindi, Nimari, Marathi, Bhilali.

== Description ==
Khalwa is a tehsil headquarters and a Development Block, it includes about 86 gram panchayats. A police station is also located in the town and several bank services are available.

=== Pin Code ===
Khalwa Pin Code is 450117. Pin Code is also known as Zip Code or Postal Code.

== Transport ==
Khalwa is 50 km away from District Headquarter and well connected with roads and bus services available here.

=== Nearby cities ===
Barwaha, Bhikangaon, Mundi, Nepanagar, Burhanpur, Khandwa, Harsud, Pandhana, Punasa.
