= Khaigaon railway station =

Railway station in Madhya Pradesh

Khaigaon

General information
- Location: Mundi–Palsud Road, Mundi, Madhya Pradesh; India
- Coordinates: 22.0062°N 76.4778°E
- Elevation: 296 metres (971 ft)
- System: Indian Railways station
- Owner: Indian Railways
- Operator: West Central Railway
- Line: Jabalpur–Bhusaval section
- Platforms: 2
- Tracks: 3
- Connections: Auto stand

Construction
- Structure type: Standard (on-ground station)
- Parking: No
- Cycle facilities: No

Other information
- Status: Functioning
- Station code: KHA
- Zone(s): West Central Railway
- Division(s): Bhopal

Services
Preceding station	Indian Railways	Following station
Talvadiya Junction towards ?	West Central Railway zone Bir–Talvadiya section	Bir towards ?
Location
- Location within Madhya Pradesh Location within India

Khaigaon railway station is a small railway station in Khandwa district, Madhya Pradesh. Its code is KHA. It serves Khaigaon village. The station consists of two platforms, not well sheltered. It lacks many facilities including water and sanitation.
