= Bir, Madhya Pradesh =

Bir
- Village/ Town
- Location of Madhya Pradesh, India
- Coordinates: 22.03°N 76.32°E
- Country: India
- State: Madhya Pradesh
- Region: Nimar
- District: Khandwa District

Government
  - Nearly City: Mundi
- Time zone: UTC+5:30 (IST)
- PIN: 450110
- Telephone code: 07326
- ISO 3166 code: MP-IN
- Vehicle registration: MP-12
- Spoken Languages: Hindi, Nimadi
- Railway Station: Bir Railway Station

Bir is a village and a Gram Panchayat Near Mundi City of Khandwa district in the Indian state of Madhya Pradesh.
