= Chhanera railway station =

Railway station in Madhya Pradesh, India

Chhanera

General information
- Location: Chhanera, Madhya Pradesh; India
- Coordinates: 21.9638°N 76.7072°E
- Elevation: 283 metres (928 ft)
- System: Indian Railways station
- Owner: Indian Railways
- Operator: Western Central Railway
- Line: Jabalpur–Bhusaval section
- Platforms: 2
- Tracks: 4
- Connections: Auto stand

Construction
- Structure type: Standard (on-ground station)
- Parking: No
- Cycle facilities: No

Other information
- Status: Functioning
- Station code: CAER
- Zone(s): West Central Railway
- Division(s): Bhopal

Services
Preceding station	Indian Railways	Following station
Barud towards ?	West Central Railway zone Jabalpur–Bhusaval section	Charkheda Khurd towards ?
Location
- Location within Madhya Pradesh Location within India

Chhanera railway station is a small railway station in Khandwa district, Madhya Pradesh. Its code is CAER. It serves Chhanera town. The station consists of three platforms, none of which are well sheltered. It lacks many facilities including water and sanitation.
