= Mardana, Madhya Pradesh =

Mardana Mayurana
- Village
- Location within Madhya Pradesh
- Coordinates: 22.176377°N 75.819268°E
- Country: India
- State: Madhya Pradesh
- District: Khargone
- Elevation: 167.9 m (551 ft)

Population (2011)
  - Total: 5,001
- Time zone: UTC+05:30 (IST)
- Pincode: 451113
- ISO 3166 code: MP-IN
- Website: http://www.fb.com/VillageMardana

Mardana is a village in the state of Madhya Pradesh, India, situated on the banks of the Narmada river. It lies within the Nimar region (also rendered as Nimad), where Nimadi and Hindi are predominantly spoken. The nearest airport is Indore Airport, and the closest railway station is Khandwa.

== Geography and population ==
The village sits above the river and is reached by a steep ascent from the riverbank. The village features paved streets and residential courtyards, and many houses are traditionally painted turquoise blue, a colour commonly associated with the Nimar region. Images of the river goddess Narmada are frequently displayed on the exterior walls of homes. Administratively, the village forms part of Sanawad tehsil in Khargone district (formerly West Nimar).

According to the 2011 Census of India, Mardana has a population of 5,001 people living in 1,014 households. The population consists of 2,511 males and 2,490 females, giving a sex ratio of 992, which exceeds the state average of 931. Children aged 0–6 number 760, accounting for 15.2% of the village's population, with a child sex ratio of 949, also above the state average.

Literacy levels in Mardana are lower than the state average. As of 2011, the overall literacy rate was 53.53%, compared with 69.32% for Madhya Pradesh. Male literacy stood at 65.25%, while female literacy was recorded at 41.79%.

== Administration and infrastructure ==
Under the Constitution of India and the Panchayati Raj system, Mardana is governed by an elected village head (sarpanch). The village is served by basic public infrastructure, including a government school, a dispensary, and a post office. Bus services provide connections to nearby towns such as Sanawad and Khargone.

== History ==
According to ancient documents, Mardana was established in Samvat 532 (Veshakh Sudi 3) by Mayurdwaj, son of Sardhawaj, of the Gavli caste and Sakalya subcaste. Mayurdwaj rehabilitated the Tadwi, Golar, Gavli, and Bhil communities and settled Rajputs and Gurjars from Gujarat here; consequently, the locality was named Mardana.

Before the year 1903, there were 32 mahaals Kacheri in the Khargone District of Western Nimad. Consequently, Khargone was popularly known as Khargone Battishi. Mardana was also known to have had one of these mahals. But afterward the Kashrawad got the mahaal, and the village was added to Kashrawad Town. At that time the population of the village was very less and the village had only a main road, and was known as "Choudhary Patel Ki Gali".

Ruins near the village school indicate that a small fort was constructed in the village. The fort is said to be the capital of Raja Mordhvaj who died at Prayagraj. The ruins show the sinhasana (seat) of Maharaja Mayuradhvaja in a cave. The fort has a hidden ghat (gupt ghat) and a guhavasi Shiva.

The village was also among the sites selected by Malwa queen Rani Ahilyabai to build her capital because of its history and mentions in the vedic puranas. However, her priest advised against it. She later constructed a fortified ghat and temple of Mayuresvara Shiva in the village.

The village Mardana also maintains its legacy of making a statue of Ravana, and celebrates the festive Dussehra with crowd gatherings, from the nearby villages (Bakawan, Kanapur, Nagawan, Jirbhar, and Katora).

== Economy ==
The village has an agriculture-based economy. Farming here on the black cotton soil is lucrative, and there are well-heeled and prominent families in the Nimad. Electric pumps draw water from the river through pipes extending several kilometres inland. Irrigation means that, at any time of year, crops are growing. Common crops grown in the region: wheat, cotton, chillies (mirchi), soyabean, maize, pulses, and sugarcane among others.

== Schools ==
- Government Higher Secondary School

It is located near the panchayat Bhavan with the scenarios around, having views of River Narmada and the Ghats. It has all the basic facilities and now there is also higher secondary (10+2) with the 2 subjects Bio and Arts, (Agriculture soon). Many students come here including villages Bakawan, Nagawan and Malgaon.

- Narmada Vidhya Vihar

This was one of the oldest schools in the area. According to the records available at the school, its name was "Raja Mohardwaj Bal Vidhya Mandir, Mardana" in the year 1991. Later in the year 2000, it got Govt. accreditation, and was renamed as "Narmada Vidhya Vihar Mardana", the first private Govt. accredited school in the village.

The school is co-educational with a school category as primary and upper primary and is operated in a private building donated by a villager. Also the school's management is private unaided.

- Maa Reva Gurukul Shikshan Sansthan

It's a second private school of the village. It was established in 2005. It has rapid growth within a few years of establishment.

== Tourism ==
The village is known to have 1500 years old Fort of Raja Moharwaj and inside the fort there is a man made cave, that opened in east near the Mayureshwar shiva. The condition of the caves is deteriorating because of the carelessness of the Govt. and the people.

The village has a "Laxmi Narayan Mandir" which was constructed by Sardar Ragho Ranchod Pagnis on the instructions of Punyashlok Ahilyadevi Holkar in 1785. In the back of it there is a Khedapati Hanuman Mandir.

Mardana was known for having a villager as a Darbar of 120 villages. The Darbar had a huge mansion in the village, which was stretched across a hectare. But now the mansion is dilapidated.

The village is known for its Gangour festival, a 100 year old festival of the Nimad region. Mardana being the only village in the region, for its traditional Dhaniyer Dance and Playing Cards; it is the central point of attraction during those days. Thursday local market is the only source, from which the villagers get organic vegetables, pulses and other daily items.

== Narmada Dam ==
Mardana and many villages in the region along the river Narmada will get submerged by the Maheshwar Hydroelectric Project. Resettlement is still in progress. The village came into focus in February 2000 when the "Mardana Declaration" was signed to protest against the dam construction.

In the year 2001, the New International took the interview of ex-Sarpanch, Kalu Singh Mandloi. And he discusses his concern as, " We in Mardana do not want the dam.I cannot personally believe that dam will come up because the project is such a bad one', Kalu singh is convinced that, in the end authorities will see sense.' But if it does, the people here are not willing to leave. They would rather drown.

This Land is among the most fertile in the country. Kalu Singh Mandloi asks: "Why destroy it? 'These people, of Mardana, of Nimad, are farmers. They can only farm, they can do no other thing. There is no land like this for them to go to-the state has admitted it. So what can they do if their village is destroyed? They can drown. That is all".
