= Borani Village =

- village
- Location in Madhya Pradesh, India Borani Village (India)
- Coordinates: 22.105121°N 76.441271°E
- Country: India
- State: Madhya Pradesh
- District: Khandwa

Area
  - Total: 7.33 km^{2} (2.83 sq mi)

Population (2011)
  - Total: 863
  - Density: 118/km^{2} (305/sq mi)
- Time zone: UTC+5:30 (IST)
- Vehicle registration: MP
- literacy rate: 35.69
- Sex ratio: 1.06

Borani is a village in the Punasa tehsil of Khandwa district in Madhya Pradesh, India.

== Demographics ==
According to the 2011 Census of India, Borani had a population of 863 and a total area of 7.33 km^{2}. Males and females constituted 51.45 per cent and 48.55 per cent respectively of the population. Literacy rate at that time was 35.69 per cent. People classified as scheduled tribes under India's system of positive discrimination accounted for 45.42 per cent of the population.
