= Gogaipur =

- Country: India
- State: Madhya Pradesh
- District: Khandwa
- Tehsil: Khalwa

Population
  - Total: 2,504

Gogaipur is a village in Khalwa Tehsil in East Nimar District of Madhya Pradesh State, India. It belongs to Indore Division.

== Demographics ==
The local language is Bhil. Gogaipur total population is 2504 and the number of houses are 456. The female Population is 49.3%. Literacy rate is 37.5% and the Female Literacy rate is 14.7%.

== Government ==
Bharatiya Janata Party and Indian National Congress are the major political parties in this area.
