= Surgaon Banjari railway station =

Railway station in Madhya Pradesh, India

Surgaon Banjari

General information
- Location: Surgaon Banjari, Madhya Pradesh; India
- Coordinates: 21.9466°N 76.5442°E
- Elevation: 297 metres (974 ft)
- System: Indian Railways station
- Owner: Indian Railways
- Operator: West Central Railway
- Line: Jabalpur–Bhusaval section
- Platforms: 3
- Tracks: 3
- Connections: Auto stand

Construction
- Structure type: Standard (on-ground station)
- Parking: No
- Cycle facilities: No

Other information
- Status: Functioning
- Station code: SGBJ
- Zone(s): West Central Railway
- Division(s): Bhopal

Services
Preceding station	Indian Railways	Following station
Talvadiya Junction towards ?	West Central Railway zone Jabalpur–Bhusaval section	Charkheda Khurd towards ?
Location
- Location within Madhya Pradesh Location within India

Surgaon Banjari railway station is a small railway station in Khandwa district, Madhya Pradesh. Its Indian railway station code is SGBJ. It serves Surgaon Banjari village. The station consists of three platforms. The platforms are not well sheltered. It lacks many facilities including water and sanitation.
