= Bhamori =

- Village
- Country: India
- State: Madhya Pradesh
- District: Khandwa district

Population (2011)
  - Total: 750

Bhamori is a village in Punasa tehsil of Khandwa district in Madhya Pradesh, India. As of the 2011 census, the total population is 740.
