= Nimar =

South-western region of Madhya Pradesh, India

Coordinates: 21.82°N 76.35°E

Nimar or Nimad is the southwestern region of Madhya Pradesh state in west-central India. This region includes sub-regions such as Khargone, Khandwa, Barwani, Burhanpur, and the southern parts of Dhar.

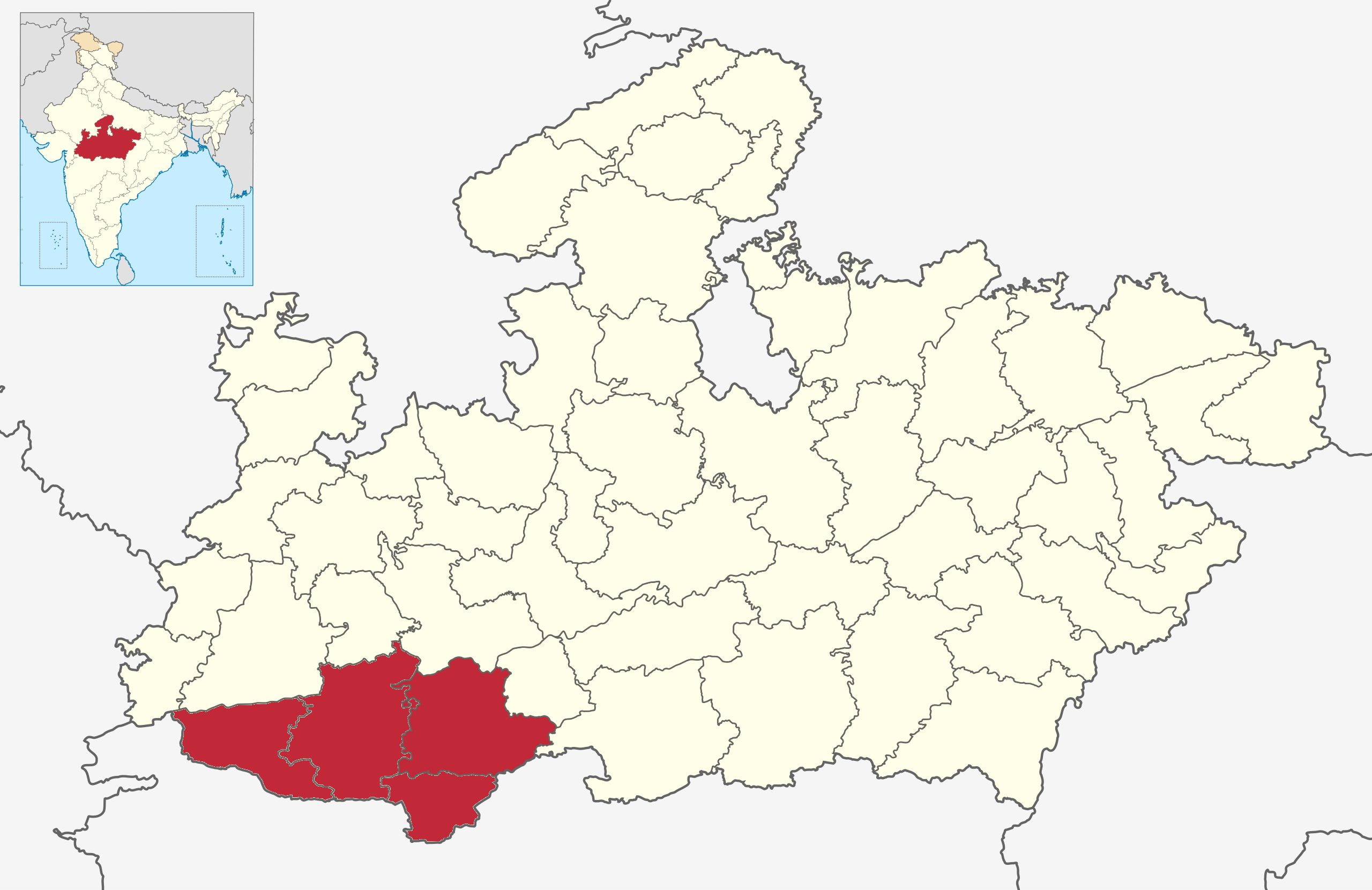
Location of Nimar in Madhya Pradesh

The region lies south of the Vindhya Range, and consists of two portions of the Narmada and Tapti river valleys, separated by a section of the Satpura Range, about 15 miles (24 km) in breadth. On the highest peak, about 800 ft (244 m) above the plain and 1800 ft (549 m) above sea-level, stands the fortress of Asirgarh, commanding a pass which has for centuries been the chief highway between Upper India and the Deccan.

The Nimar region is home to the Nimadi language.

== History ==
According to historical records found in the Indore Gazetteer, Bija Gawli, also known as Bija Singh Ahir, held the position of king in Nimar during the 14th century. The Ain-i-Akbari, a significant historical document, makes reference to Khargao, a Mahal (Palace) located in Bijagarh, Nimar. As we progress into the fifteenth century, it becomes apparent that numerous Gawli or Ahir/Yadav chiefs took initiative in establishing small municipalities in southern Nimar, which notably included the Bijagarh fort. The Gazetteer firmly asserts that their dominion over these territories is an indisputable historical fact.

Later on Nimar was formed as a district of British India, in the Nerbudda Division of the Central Provinces. The administrative headquarters were at Khandwa; but the capital in Muslim times was Burhanpur. Area, 4273 mi² (11,067 km²), population (1901) 329,615. The staple crops were cotton and millet; ganja or Indian hemp was also allowed to be grown under government supervision. The Great Indian Peninsula railway ran through the district, and a branch of the Rajputana line from Indore joined it at Khandwa. There were factories for ginning and pressing cotton at Khandwa, and manufacture of gold-embroidered cloth at Burhanpur. The district contained extensive forests, and the government preserved a section known is the Punasa forest, which extended for about 120 miles (190 km) along the south bank of the Narmada, home to forests of teak (Tectona grandis), sain (Terminalia tomentosa) and anjan (Hardwickia binata) trees.

Nimar was also a district in the princely state of Indore lying west of the British district on both banks of the Narmada River. Area, 3871 mile² (10,026 km²); pop. (1901) 257,110. From 1823 onwards this tract, then belonging to Sindhia rulers of Gwalior, was under British management; in 1861 it was ceded in full sovereignty to the British, but in 1867 it passed to Holkar rulers of Indore as the result of an exchange of territory.

After Indian independence in 1947, The former British district became the Nimar District of the new state of Madhya Pradesh, with its administrative seat at Khandwa; the Nimar District of Indore state became the Nimar district of the new state of Madhya Bharat, with its administrative seat at Khargone. When Madhya Bharat was merged into Madhya Pradesh on 1 November 1956, The former Madhya Bharat district became West Nimar District, while the eastern district became East Nimar District. West Nimar district was split into the districts of Barwani and Khargone on 24 May 1998 and similarly East Nimar district was split into the districts of Khandwa and Burhanpur on 15 August 2003.

The population of this region according to the 2011 Census is 7,044,884 people.

== Districts of Nimar ==
- Barwani
- Burhanpur
- Harda
- Jhabua
- Khandwa
- Khargone
- Dhar (Manawar Tehsil) (Southern part)
- Mandhata (Barwaha(Headquerter), Sanawad, Punasa, Mundi Tehsil)

== Cities of Nimar ==
- Anjad
- Bagh
- Barwaha
- Barwani
- Beria
- Bhagwanpura
- Bhikangaon
- Burhanpur
- Dhamnod
- Dharampuri
- Gogawan
- Harda
- Harsud
- Icchapur
- Jhabua
- Jhirniya
- Kasrawad
- Kenud
- Khandwa
- Khalwa
- Khargone
- Khetia
- Kukshi
- Maheshwar
- Manawar
- Mandav
- Mandhata
- Mandleshwar
- Mundi
- Nepanagar
- Palsud
- Pandhana
- Punasa
- Pansemal
- Rajpur
- Sanawad
- Satwas
- Sendhwa
- Shahpur
- Thikri

== Notable people ==
- Tantia Bhīl - a tribal leader who actively fought against British Raj between 1878 and 1889
- Kishore Kumar- One of the greatest Indian playback singers.
- Nandkumar Singh Chauhan
- Vijayalaxmi Sadho
- Arun Yadav Former Member of Parliament, Khandwa
- Sachin Yadav - MLA and former Agricultural minister of Madhya Pradesh.
- Subhash Yadav - Former deputy chief minister.
- Narayan Patel (Madhya Pradesh politician)
