= Bakawan =

Bakawan Gaulok Dham Bakawan
- Village
- Location within Madhya Pradesh
- Coordinates: 22.1677°N 75.8519°E
- Country: India
- State: Madhya Pradesh
- District: Khargone
- Elevation: 167.9 m (551 ft)
- Time zone: UTC+05:30 (IST)

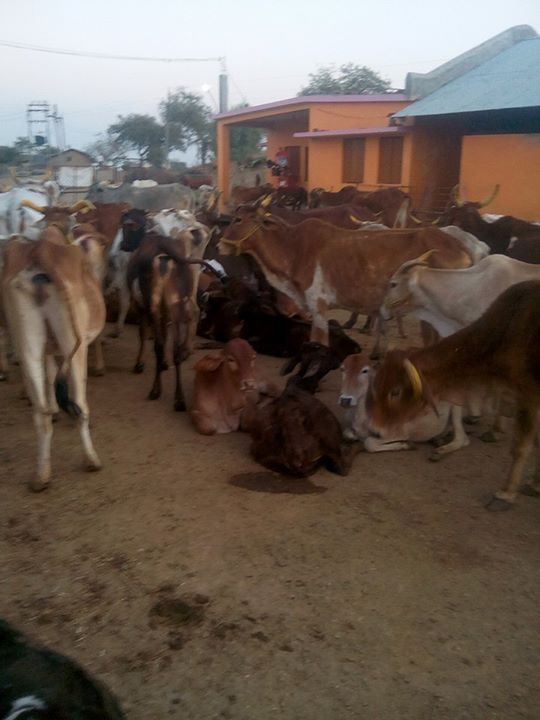
Ma Narmada Goshala Bakawan

Bakawan is a village in the state of Madhya Pradesh located on the banks of the river Narmada in India. The village falls under the Nimar region (pronounced Nimadh/Nimad/Nimarh) in Malwa. The region predominantly speaks the local dialect "Nimadi" and Hindi. Nearest airport is Indore and nearest railway station is Khandwa.

== Introduction ==
A steep climb from the banks of the river Narmada leads to the village with paved streets. The village has a population around 8000 as per 2011 Census, supported by a government school, dispensary, nearest post office mardana and other amenities. Six buses run from the city to Sanawad and Khargone.

== History ==
Ruins indicates that a small fort was constructed in the nearby village called Mardana. The fort is said to be the capital of Raja Mordhvaj who died at Prayagraj. The ruins show the sinhasana (seat) of Maharaja Mayuradhvaja in a cave. The fort has a hidden ghat (gupt ghat) and a guhavasi Shiva. The village was also among the sites selected by Malwa queen Rani Ahilyabai to build her capital because of its history and mentions in the vedic puranas. However, her priest advised against it. She later constructed a fortified ghat and temple of Mayuresvara Shiva in the village. The village Bakawan have also a shiv mandir constructed by Devi Ahilya Bai Holkar, at that time Bakawan was under the empire of Ahilya Bai Holkar. Also, she made Maheshwar as her capital.

== land use ==
The village has an agriculture-based land. Situated in the Narmada river valley, the village has access to a perennial water source and has a rich and fertile black soil. Common crops grown in the region: wheat, cotton, chilli (mirchi), soybean, peanuts, and sugarcane among others.

== Schools ==
The Government School is located in Navalpura region of Bakawan and has views of River Narmada and the Ghats. It has all the basic facilities with a large ground for playing. Also it supports with its building many functions such as election.

Pratibha Gyan Vidhya Mandir is a private school having both the mediums i.e. Hindi and English.

Chandra Shekhar Azad Public School, Bakawan is a private school which aims to provide quality education for all with benefit of low fee to parents.

== Tourism ==
The village of Bakawan is known for making and exportation of Narmadeshwar Shivlings across the world. This is the only village in the world which succeeds in making of the Narmadeshwar Shivlings. The stones from which the Narmadeshwar Shivlings made are mainly found in the river Narmada. The village is also famous for the statue of Lord Balrama located in front of the Ram Mandir Bakawan (Rama Temple). There is a Gaushala (the place where the cows lives) named on the river Narmada Called Ma Narmada Gaushala Bakawan constructed in 1998 by Pt. Kamal Kishore Ji Nagar. The village is also known as Gaulok Dham Bakawan.

== Narmada Dam ==
Bakawan and many other villages in the region along the river Narmada will get submerged by the Maheshwar Hydroelectric Project. Resettlement is still under progress. The village came into focus in February 2000 when the "Bakawan Declaration" was signed to protest against the dam construction.
