= Mathela railway station =

Railway station in Madhya Pradesh

Mathela

General information
- Location: MP SH 26, Punasa, Madhya Pradesh; India
- Coordinates: 21.8786°N 76.3891°E
- Elevation: 322 metres (1,056 ft)
- System: Indian Railways station
- Owner: Indian Railways
- Operator: West Central Railway
- Line: Jabalpur–Bhusaval section
- Platforms: 2
- Tracks: 3
- Connections: Auto stand

Construction
- Structure type: Standard (on-ground station)
- Parking: No
- Cycle facilities: No

Other information
- Status: Functioning
- Station code: MTA
- Zone(s): West Central Railway
- Division(s): Bhopal

Services
Preceding station	Indian Railways	Following station
Khandwa Junction towards ?	West Central Railway zone Jabalpur–Bhusaval section	Talvadiya Junction towards ?
Location
- Location within Madhya Pradesh Location within India

Mathela railway station is a small railway station in Khandwa district, Madhya Pradesh. Its code is MTA. It serves Mathela village. The station consists of two platforms. The platforms are not well sheltered. It lacks many facilities including water and sanitation.
