= Narayan Patel =

Narayan Patel may refer to:

- Narayan Patel (Gujarat politician)
- Narayan Patel (Madhya Pradesh politician)
