= Charkheda Khurd railway station =

Railway station in Madhya Pradesh, India

General information
- Location: Charkheda Khurd, Khandwa district, Madhya Pradesh; India
- Coordinates: 21.9387°N 76.6415°E
- Elevation: 297 metres (974 ft)
- System: Indian Railways station
- Owner: Indian Railways
- Operator: West Central Railway
- Line: Jabalpur–Bhusaval section
- Platforms: 2
- Tracks: 3
- Connections: Auto stand

Construction
- Structure type: Standard (on-ground station)
- Parking: No
- Cycle facilities: No

Other information
- Status: Double electric line
- Station code: CKKD
- Zone(s): West Central Railway
- Division(s): Bhopal

Services
Preceding station	Indian Railways	Following station
Surgaon Banjari towards ?	West Central Railway zone Jabalpur–Bhusaval section	Chhanera towards ?
Location

Charkheda Khurd railway station is a small railway station in Khandwa district, Madhya Pradesh. Its code is CKKD. It serves Charkheda Khurd village. The station consists of two platforms. The platforms are not well sheltered. It lacks many facilities including water and sanitation.khandwa Junction pin code is 450001
