= Pandhana =

Pandhana Pandhana
- Town
- Location within Madhya Pradesh Location within India
- Coordinates: 21.7°N 76.22°E
- Country: India
- S: Madhya Pradesh
- Region: Nimar
- District: Khandwa District

Government
  - Type: Mayor–Council
  - Body: Nagar Parishad
  - MLA: Chaya More (BJP)
  - Nagar Parishad President: Sunita Pradeep Jagdhanne
  - Rank: 4th in Khandwa district

Population (2011)249
  - Total: below 15,000
- Time zone: UTC+05:30 (IST)
- PIN: 450661
- ISO 3166 code: IN-MP
- Vehicle registration: MP-12
- Spoken Languages: English, Hindi, Nimadi, language

Pandhana is a town and a Nagar Parishad in Khandwa district in the Indian state of Madhya Pradesh.

== Geography ==
Pandhana is located at 21.7°N 76.22°E. It has an average elevation of 249 metres (1145 feet).

== Demographics ==
As of the 2011 Census of India, Pandhana had a population of 13694. Males constitute 53% of the population and females 47%. Pandhana has an average literacy rate of 64%, higher than the national average of 59.5%: male literacy is 73%, and female literacy is 53%. In Pandhana, 16% of the population is under 6 years old.

== Banks ==
State Bank of India - Gandi Chowk Pandhana

Bank of Maharashtra - Gandhi chowk Pandhana

IDFC Bank - Front of Sai Temple Pandhana

== Education ==
Jawahar Navodaya Vidyalya, Pandhana.

Govt. Higher Secondary School, Pandhana.

Krishna Academy, Pandhana.

Swami Vivekanand Public School, Pandhana.

== Nearby cities ==
Barwaha, Bhikangaon, punasa, Nepanagar, Burhanpur, Khandwa, Harsud.
