= Chichli Khurd =

Vvillage in Madhya Pradesh, India

Coordinates: 22.066°N 76.460°E

Chichli Khurd is a village in Punasa Tehsil, East Nimar district, Madhya Pradesh. Its population was 1,095 as per population census 2011.
