= Omkareshwar Dam =

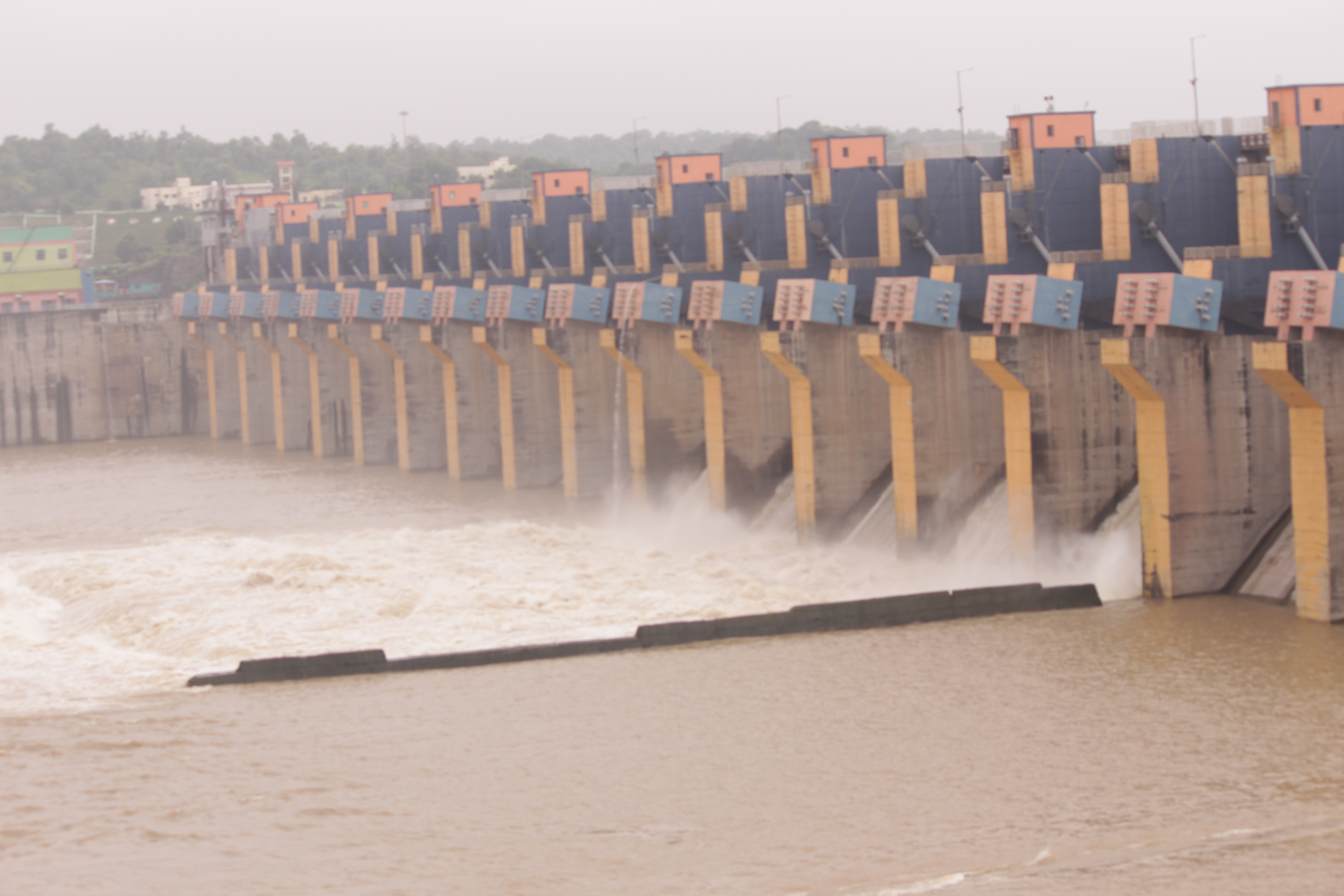
- Location: Mandhata, Khandwa, Madhya Pradesh, India
- Coordinates: 22°14′37.26″N 76°9′46.83″E
- Status: Operational
- Construction began: 30 August 2003
- Opening date: November 2007
- Owner(s): Government of Madhya Pradesh
- Operator(s): Narmada Hydroelectric Development Corporation (NHDC) (Joint Venture of NHPC and Government of Madhya Pradesh)

Dam and spillways
- Type of dam: Concrete Gravity dam
- Impounds: Narmada River
- Height: 53 m (174 ft)
- Length: 949 m (3,114 ft)
- Spillways: 23 radial gates (20 m x 18.037 m)
- Spillway type: Ogee
- Spillway capacity: 88,315 m^{3}/s (3,118,800 cu ft/s)

Reservoir
- Creates: Omkareshwar Reservoir
- Total capacity: 987,000,000 m^{3} (800,000 acre⋅ft) (34.84 tmcft)
- Active capacity: 299,000,000 m^{3} (242,000 acre⋅ft) (10.54 tmcft)
- Inactive capacity: 688,000,000 m^{3} (558,000 acre⋅ft)
- Catchment area: 64,880 km^{2} (25,050 sq mi)
- Surface area: 93.36 km^{2} (36.05 sq mi)

Power Station
- Operator(s): NHDC
- Turbines: Dam: 8 × 65 MW Francis pump-turbine Canal: 5 MW Kaplan-type
- Installed capacity: 525 MW
- Website nhdcindia.com/Site/frmProjectDetails.aspx?PID=1%2F

The Omkareshwar Dam is a gravity dam on the Narmada River just upstream of Mandhata in Khandwa district, Madhya Pradesh, India. It is named after the Omkareshwar temple located just downstream. The dam was constructed between 2003 and 2007 with the purpose of providing water for irrigation of 132,500 ha (327,000 acres). An associated hydroelectric power station located at the base of the dam has an installed capacity of 520 MW.

== See also ==
- Omkareshwar Floating Solar Power Park
