= Tantia Bhil =

19 th century indian rebel

Mama Tantiya Bhil
- तंट्या भील
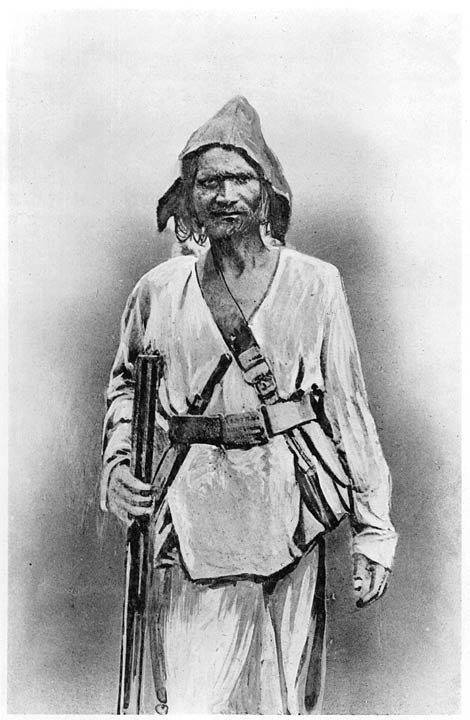
- Illustration from The Tribes and Castes of the Central Provinces of India (1916)
- Born: Tantya Bhil; 25 January 1840; Pandhana, Nagpur Kingdom
- Died: 4 December 1889 (aged 49); Jubbulpore, Central Provinces, British India
- Cause of death: Hanged
- Resting place: Patalpani, Madhya Pradesh

Tantia Bhil (or Tantya Bheel, Tantya Mama; 25 January 1840 – 4 December 1889) was a freedom fighter active in India between 1878 and 1889. He is described very negatively as a criminal in the British-era accounts, but is recognized by Indians as a heroic figure. Accounts of both eras have described him as an "Indian Robin Hood".

== Life about Tantiya Bheel ==
Tantia was born in an Indian tribal Bhil community at the Pandhana village in Nimar district of Nagpur Kingdom on 25 January 1840 (on the 12th day of Sankranti; as it occurred on either 12/13 January in those days so 24/25 January is considered). As per one modern account, he embarked on his way of life after the harsh measures taken by the British following the Indian Rebellion of 1857. Tantia was first arrested around 1874 for "bad livelihood" and after a year's sentence turned to more serious crimes of theft and kidnapping. He was arrested for the second time in 1878 by Haji Nasrullah Khan Yousufzai (British army officer) and jailed at Khandwa, escaping after only three days, and from there took up his life as a dacoit which money used for local community. Money originally looted by British in India.

Tantia was lured to a parley by an officer of the Indore army who promised him a pardon, but was ambushed and taken to Jubbulpore where he was tried and hanged on 4 December 1889.

== History ==
It is an indisputable fact that freedom fighters have all along been termed as rebels by the powers that be, ranging from the Maratha Empire of Shivaji or the British rule. Tantya Bhil was one of the greatest revolutionaries who waged an armed struggle against the British rule for twelve years and endeared himself to the masses by virtue of his indomitable courage and passion to uproot the foreign rule. Political parties and educated class launched forceful movement for ending the British Rule. But much before these movements, tribal communities and revolutionary like Tantya Bhil raised a banner of revolt against the British rule. Tantya Bhil became a symbol of the feelings of tribals and general people.

About one hundred twenty years ago Tantya Bhil emerged as a great hero of the masses and became since then a long-cherished pride of Bhil tribe. He epitomized the indomitable courage, exceptional agility and organizing skill.

Tantya Bhil used to plunder the government treasuries of the British government and wealth of their sycophants used to distribute it among the poor and needy. In fact, he was the Messiah of the have-nots. He was popularly called Mama by people of all age groups. This address of Tantya became so popular that the Bhils still feel proud in being addressed as "Mama". He used to reach out to those who were in need of financial help in a miraculous manner.

The news of the arrest of Tantya Bhil was prominently published in the 10 November 1889 issue of the New York Times. In this news he was described as the "Robin Hood of India".

He wanted to teach a lesson to the British and to realize Bhils’ dream of socialist society. He was fired with a passion to free India from British subjugation. He broke the jail many times.

He was skillful in guerrilla warfare. He was also a great shooter and proficient in traditional archery. "Daava" or Falia was his main weapon. He had also learnt to handle gun.

Right from his young age, he lived in dense forests, valleys, ravines and mountains all his life measuring swords with the British and Holkar State's armies. He inflected reverses on the police of mighty British Empire and eluded them for many years. Thousands of people were arrested and hundreds of them were thrown behind bars on the charge of helping Tantya.

Ultimately, Tantya was arrested due to treachery of Ganpat, the husband of his formal sister. He was kept in the Central India Agency Jail in the British Residency area at Indore. Later, he was taken to Jubbulpore under strict police guard. He was heavily chained and kept in Jubbulpore jail where the British officers tortured him inhumanly. All types of atrocities were perpetrated on him. The Sessions Court, Jubbulpore sentenced him to be hanged till death on 19 October 1889.

The British government was scared about the breaking out of a Bhil rebellion. It is generally believed that after hanging him his body was thrown near Patalpani railway station on Khandwa rail route near Indore. The spot where his wooden effigies were placed is considered to be the Samadhi of Tantya Mama. Even today all the train drivers stop the train for a moment as a mark of respect to Tantya Mama.

== Coverage in Raj media ==
An 1891 article on rhinoplasty in The Lancet presented a Maratha patient whose nose was restored after having been cut off by Tantia Bhil shortly before his capture, and remarked Tantia's surprise, when confronted with the Brahmin whose nose had been restored before he entered the witness-box, was very amusing.

== In popular culture ==
- Tantya Bheel (2012)
