= Mandhata Assembly constituency =

Constituency of the Madhya Pradesh legislative assembly in India

Coordinates: 22.25°N 76.15°E

Mandhata
- Constituency No. 175 for the Madhya Pradesh Legislative Assembly

Constituency details
- Country: India
- Region: Central India
- State: Madhya Pradesh
- District: Khandwa
- Lok Sabha constituency: Khandwa
- Established: 2008
- Reservation: None

Member of Legislative Assembly
- 16th Madhya Pradesh Legislative Assembly
- Incumbent Narayan Patel
- Party: Bharatiya Janata Party
- Elected year: 2023
- Preceded by: Lokendra Singh Tomar

Mandhata is one of the 230 Vidhan Sabha (Legislative Assembly) constituencies of Madhya Pradesh state in central India. It is part of Khandwa district.

== Members of the Legislative Assembly ==
Year	Member	Party
2008	Lokendra Singh Tomar	Bharatiya Janata Party
2013	Lokendra Singh Tomar	Bharatiya Janata Party
2018	Narayan Patel	Indian National Congress
2020 (Note: by-poll)	Narayan Patel	Bharatiya Janata Party
2023	Narayan Patel	Bharatiya Janata Party

== Election results ==
=== 2023 ===
2023 Madhya Pradesh Legislative Assembly election: Mandhata
Party	Candidate	Votes	%	±%
BJP	Narayan Patel	80,880	47.94	−5.39
INC	Uttam Rajnarayan Singh Purni	80,291	47.59	+8.94
Independent	Rahul Chandel Adiwashi	2,908	1.72	
NOTA	None of the above	1,554	0.92	−0.18
Majority		589	0.35	−14.33
Turnout		168,723	78.02	+1.50
BJP hold		Swing		

=== 2020 bypoll ===
2020 Madhya Pradesh Legislative Assembly by-elections: Mandhata
Party	Candidate	Votes	%	±%
BJP	Narayan Patel	80,394	53.33	+6.93
INC	Uttampal Rajnarayan Singh Purni	58,265	38.65	−8.57
Independent	Rao Jitendra Singh Rao Shailendra Singh	6,583	4.37	
BSP	Jitendra Vasande	1,561	1.04	−0.15
NOTA	None of the above	1,652	1.1	+0.06
Majority		22,129	14.68	+13.86
Turnout		150,748	76.52	−2.31
BJP gain from INC		Swing		

=== 2018 ===
2018 Madhya Pradesh Legislative Assembly election: Mandhata
Party	Candidate	Votes	%	±%
INC	Narayan Patel	71,228	47.22	
BJP	Kunwar Narendra Singh Tomar	69,992	46.4	
GGP	Bliram Devra	3,305	2.19	
AAP	Dr. Bhaktprahlad Mishra	1,891	1.25	
BSP	Anil Ghanshyam	1,794	1.19	
NOTA	None of the above	1,575	1.04	
Majority		1,236	0.82	
Turnout		150,831	78.83	
INC gain from BJP		Swing		

=== 2013 ===
2013 Madhya Pradesh Legislative Assembly election: Mandhata
Party	Candidate	Votes	%	±%
BJP	Lokendra Singh Tomar	65,327	48.61	
INC	Narayan Patel	60,990	45.38	
NOTA	None of the Above	3,119	2.32	
IND	Rajesh Pawar	2,063	1.54	
BSP	Ramesh Bhaskar	2,048	1.52	
Majority		4,337	3.30	
Turnout		1,34,467	73.95	
BJP hold		Swing		

== See also ==
- Mandhata
- Mundi

BADNAGAR
