= Bir railway station =

Railway station in Madhya Pradesh

Bir

General information
- Location: Bir, Madhya Pradesh; India
- Coordinates: 22.0528°N 76.5470°E
- Elevation: 291 metres (955 ft)
- System: Indian Railways station
- Owner: Indian Railways
- Operator: West Central Railway
- Platforms: 2
- Tracks: 4
- Connections: Auto stand

Construction
- Structure type: Standard (on-ground station)
- Parking: No
- Cycle facilities: No

Other information
- Status: Functioning
- Station code: BIR
- Zone(s): West Central Railway
- Division(s): Bhopal
Location
- Location within Madhya Pradesh Location within India

Bir railway station is a small railway station in Khandwa district, Madhya Pradesh. Its code is BIR. It serves Bir village. The station consists of two platforms. The platforms are not well sheltered. It lacks many facilities including water and sanitation.
