= Khalwa =

Khalwa (Arabic: خلوة), an Arabic word meaning "seclusion" or "privacy", may refer to:

- Khalwa (Sufism), a Sufism concept for solitude
- Khalwa (structure), a place of seclusion
- Khalwa (school), a Quranic school in Sudan
- Khalwa, Madhya Pradesh, a town in Khandwa District, Madhya Pradesh

== See also ==
- Khalwati order, an Islamic Sufi order in Egypt, Albania, Bosnia, Turkey, and Azerbaijan
