= Talvadiya Junction railway station =

Railway station in Madhya Pradesh, India

Talvadiya Junction

General information
- Location: MP SH 26, Khandwa, Madhya Pradesh; India
- Coordinates: 21.9278°N 76.4448°E
- Elevation: 308 metres (1,010 ft)
- System: Indian Railways station
- Owner: Indian Railways
- Operator: West Central Railway
- Line: Jabalpur–Bhusaval section
- Platforms: 2
- Tracks: 3
- Connections: Auto stand

Construction
- Structure type: Standard (on-ground station)
- Parking: No
- Cycle facilities: No

Other information
- Status: Functioning
- Station code: TLV
- Zone(s): West Central Railway
- Division(s): Bhopal

Services
Preceding station	Indian Railways	Following station
Mathela towards ?	Western Railway zone Jabalpur–Bhusaval section	Khaigaon towards ?
Location
- Location within Madhya Pradesh Location within India

Talvadiya Junction railway station is a small railway station in Khandwa district, Madhya Pradesh. Its code is TLV. It serves Talvadiya village. The station consists of two platforms, neither well sheltered. It lacks many facilities including water and sanitation.
