= Dada Dhuniwale Thermal Power Plant =

Power station in Madhya Pradesh, India

Dada Dhuniwale Thermal Power Plant is a planned coal based thermal power project located at village Goradia in Khandwa district in Indian state of Madhya Pradesh. The power plant is one of the coal based power plants of Madhya Pradesh Power Generation Company Limited.

== Capacity ==
Its planned capacity is 1600 MW (2x800 MW). The project is yet to start due to non availability of coal linkage.
