= Chhanera =

Coordinates: 21.623°N 76.372°E

- Town
- Location in Madhya Pradesh, India Chhanera (India)
- Country: India
- State: Madhya Pradesh
- District: Khandwa
- Tehsil: Harsud tehsil

Government
  - Type: Nagar Panchayat

Population (2011)
  - Total: 22,052

Languages
  - Official: Hindi
- Time zone: UTC+5:30 (IST)

Chhanera is a town and municipality in Khandwa district in the Indian state of Madhya Pradesh. The town was established for residents of Harsud displaced when it was submerged under the waters of the Indira Sagar dam in July 2004.

== Demographics ==
As of the 2011 Indian census, Chhanera had a population of 22,052 and was 51% male, and 49% female. Chhanera's average literacy rate was 68%, with 74% male literacy and 62% female literacy. 15% of Chhanera's population was under 6 years of age.
