= Punwar, Solapur district =

Village in Uttar Pradesh

Coordinates: 25°26′N 81°19′E

Punwar
- village
- Location in Maharashtra, India Punwar (India)
- Country: India
- State: Uttar Pradesh
- District: Kaushambi district

Languages
  - Official: Hindi
- Time zone: UTC+5:30 (IST)
- PIN: 212214

Punwar is a village in the paschim sharira city in the Kaushambi district, Uttar Pradesh

== Demographics ==
Covering 1,088 hectares (2,690 acres) and comprising 578 households at the time of the 2011 census of India, Punwar had a population of 3808. There were 1973 males and 1835 females, with 456 people being aged six or younger.

𝗣𝗹𝗮𝗰𝗲𝘀

1. Uchch prathmik vidyalaya, punwar, Vikash Khand -Sarsawan, Kaushambi -212214

Punwar village has only one school. There is a Gram Panchayat within the premises of this school.This school was established in 1948
