= Narayan Patel (Gujarat politician) =

Indian politician

MLA of Gujarat
- In office 2007–2012
- Constituency: Unjha

Personal details
- Party: Bhartiya Janata Party

Narayan Patel is a Member of Legislative assembly from Unjha constituency in Gujarat for its 12th legislative assembly.
