= Punwar =

Punwar may refer to:

- Parmar, an alternate name for the Rajput clan
- The Paramara dynasty of the Parmar clan
- Punwar, Solapur district, a village in Maharashtra
