= Omkareshwar Floating Solar Power Park =

Solar power park in Khandwa, India

- Country: India
- Location: Khandwa, Madhya Pradesh, India
- Coordinates: 22.218138°N 76.185111°E
- Construction began: 2022
- Commission date: Phase-1 (2023)
- Operators: Rewa Ultra Mega Solar Limited; AMP Energy; NHPC; SJVN

Solar farm
- Type: Flat-panel PV

Power generation
- Nameplate capacity: 600 MW

Omkareshwar Floating Solar Power Park is a floating photovoltaic power station at Omkareshwar Dam, Khandwa, India.

== History ==
Auction bids for the floating solar power plant were around Rs 3.25 per unit energy by the operators AMP Energy (100 MW), NHDC (100 MW), and SJVN (90 MW).

The 600 MW plant is being built on the Omakareshwar Dam's reservoir and the evacuating infrastructure is being provided by the state-owned Rewa Ultra Mega Solar Limited (RUMSL). Reportedly, this plan will be the largest floating solar power generation facility globally.

In August 2023, a capacity of 278 MW had been activated. The first part of the project started with solar panels that each generate 0.5MW and 0.4MW of power.

In April 2024, parts of it were damaged in a storm, likely due to insufficient anchoring.

The project was commissioned by Rewa Ultra Mega Solar Limited, a joint venture between Madhya Pradesh UrjaVikas Nigam Limited and Solar Energy Corporation of India. The project was commissioned in August 2024 with 90 MW.

== See also ==
- Floating solar
