= Hanuwantiya =

Tourist attraction in Madhya Pradesh, India

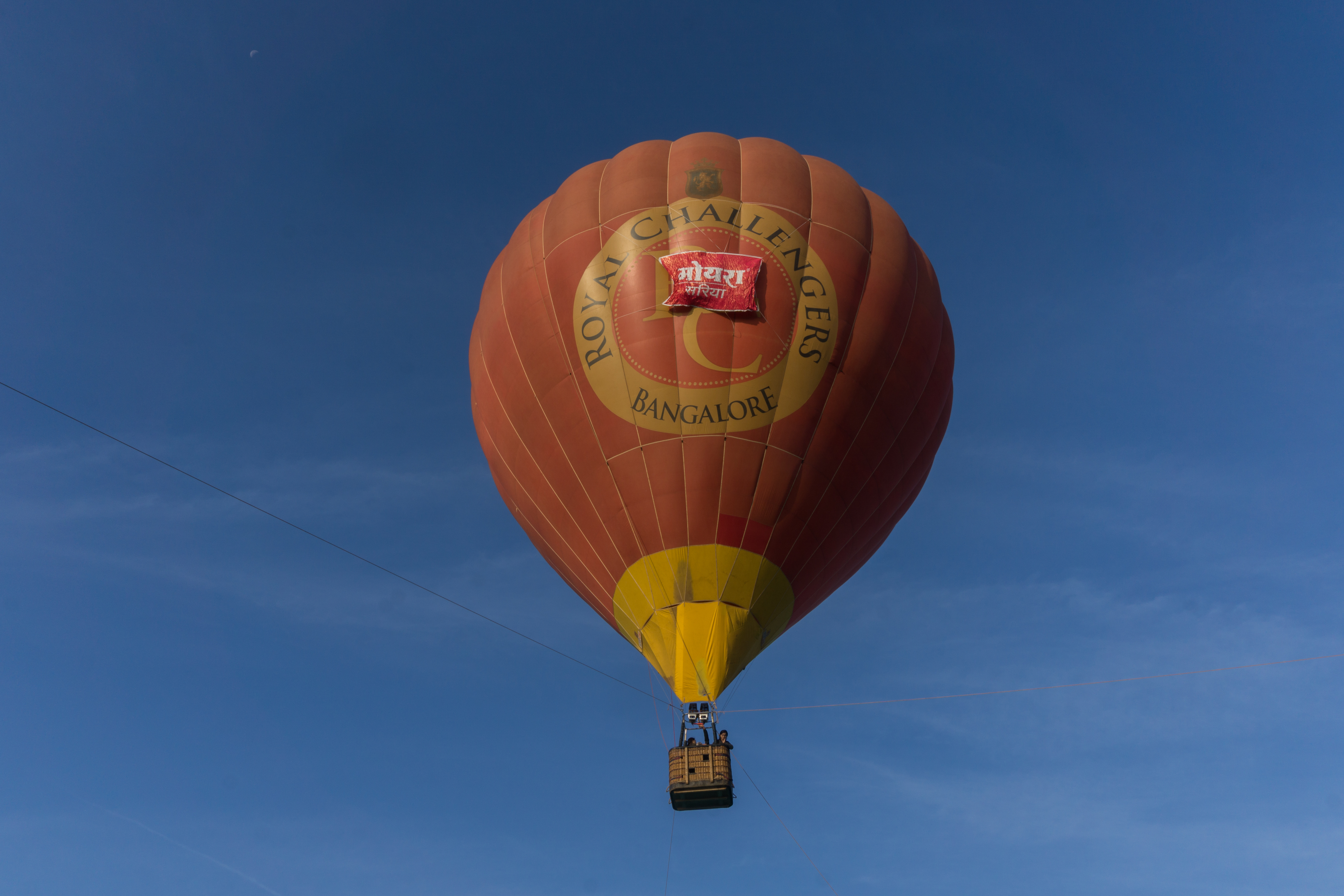
Gas balloon at Jal Mahotsav, Hanuwantiya, Madhya Pradesh

Hanuwantiya is an island located in Khandwa district, Madhya Pradesh, India. It is part of an initiative by the Madhya Pradesh Tourism Development Corporation to promote tourism in the state. The island takes its name from the nearby village of Hanuwantiya.

Hanuwantiya has been developed as a tourism hub by the Madhya Pradesh Tourism Development Corporation.

== Transport ==
The nearest airport is Devi Ahilya Bai Holkar Airport in Indore district, located approximately 150 km from Hanuwantiya. The nearest railway station is in Khandwa district, about 50 km away. Hanuwantiya is approximately 150 km away from Indore by road and 170 km away from Omkareshwar.

== Weather ==
The island experiences three major weather conditions throughout the year. The cold season begins in November and lasts until March, with average morning temperatures of 5 °C and afternoon temperatures around 15 °C. Summer spans from April to June, bringing daytime temperatures of approximately 45 °C and cooler evenings at 24 °C. The monsoon season starts in July and continues until October.

== Water festival ==
The water festival was organized for the first time from 12 to 21 February 2016. During the festival, many activities were organized by the tourism department, such as kite flying, volleyball, star gazing, cycling, parasailing, and birdwatching.
