= Bhikangaon =

Bhikangaon Bhikangaon
- town
- Location in Madhya Pradesh, India Bhikangaon (India)
- Coordinates: 21.87°N 75.95°E
- Country: India
- State: Madhya Pradesh
- District: Khargone
- Elevation: 278 m (912 ft)

Population (2011)
  - Total: 16,217

Languages
  - Official: Hindi Nimadi
- Time zone: UTC+5:30 (IST)
- ISO 3166 code: IN-MP
- Vehicle registration: MP 10

Bhikangaon is a village and a nagar parishad in Khargone district in the state of Madhya Pradesh, India.

== Geography ==
It has an average elevation of 278 metres (912 feet).

== Demographics ==
As of 2001, Bhikangaon had a population of 14,288. Males constitute 52% of the population and females 48%. Bhikangaon has an average literacy rate of 69%, higher than the national average of 59.5%; with male literacy of 75% and female literacy of 62%. 15% of the population is under 6 years of age.

The Bhikangaon Nagar Panchayat has population of 16,217 of which 8,315 are males while 7,902 are females as per report released by Census India 2011.

The population of children aged 0-6 is 2221 which is 13.70% of total population of Bhikangaon (NP). In Bhikangaon Nagar Panchayat, female sex ratio is of 950 against a state average of 931. Moreover, the child sex ratio in Bhikangaon is around 884 compared to Madhya Pradesh state average of 918. The literacy rate of Bhikangaon city is 82.29% higher than the state average of 69.32%. In Bhikangaon, male literacy is around 88.58% while the female literacy rate is 75.76%.

Religion in Bhikangaon
| Religion | Percent |
| Hindus | 80.38% |
| Muslims | 18.31% |
| Jains | 0.88% |
| Others† | 0.5% |
| Christians | 0.17% |
Distribution of religions †Includes Sikhs (0.22%), Buddhists (0.00).
