= Harsud =

Harsud हरसूद (छनेरा) Channera
- Town
- Location in Madhya Pradesh, India Harsud (India)
- Coordinates: 22.1°N 76.73°E
- Country: India
- State: Madhya Pradesh
- District: Khandwa
- Founder: Harshvardhan

Government
  - Type: Nagar Parishad

Area
  - Total: 15 km^{2} (5.8 sq mi)
- Elevation: 244 m (801 ft)

Population (2011)
  - Total: 22,052
  - Density: 1,500/km^{2} (3,800/sq mi)

Languages
  - Official: Hindi
- Time zone: UTC+5:30 (IST)
- Vehicle registration: MP-12

Harsud was a town and municipality in Khandwa in the Indian state of Madhya Pradesh. Although the town was more than 700 years old, it was submerged under the waters of the Indira Sagar dam in July 2004.

== Geography ==
Harsud was located at 22.1°N 76.73°E and had an average elevation of 243 metres (800 feet). The town was relocated to Chhanera (New Harsud) after the old town was submerged.

== Wards ==
15 Wards in Harsud.

- Gandhi Ward
- Tilak Ward
- Asaf Ali Nagar
- Laxmibai Ward
- Mirza Ward
- Tughlaq Ward
- Meghnagar
- Jyotinagar
- Nehru Ward
- Sarojini Nagar
- Azamnagar
- Roopnagar
- Harsud Panchayat
- Sultania Ward
- Hanuman Nagar

== Demographics ==
As of the 2001 Indian census, Harsud had a population of 15,871, and was 52% male and 48% female. Harsud's average literacy rate of 69%, 77% male literacy and 61% female literacy, was higher than the national average of 59.5%. 14% of Harsud's population was under 6 years of age.

== Religions ==
As of the 2011 Indian census

Hindu 81.87%

Muslim 16.61%

Jain 01.16%

Christian 0.32%

Sikh 0.01%

Others 0.02%
