= Narayan Patel (Madhya Pradesh politician) =

Indian politician

Member of the Madhya Pradesh Legislative Assembly
- Constituency: Mandhata

Personal details
- Born: Mundi, Madhya Pradesh, India
- Party: Bhartiya Janata Party
- Profession: Agriculturist, politician

Narayan Patel is an Indian politician from Bhartiya Janata Party. He was elected as MLA of Mandhata in Madhya Pradesh in 2018 as candidate of Indian National Congress. He resigned as MLA from Madhya Pradesh assembly and joined Bhartiya Janata Party on 23-Jul-2020.
