= Mandhata =

Omkareshwar ओंकारेश्वर Mandhata
- Town
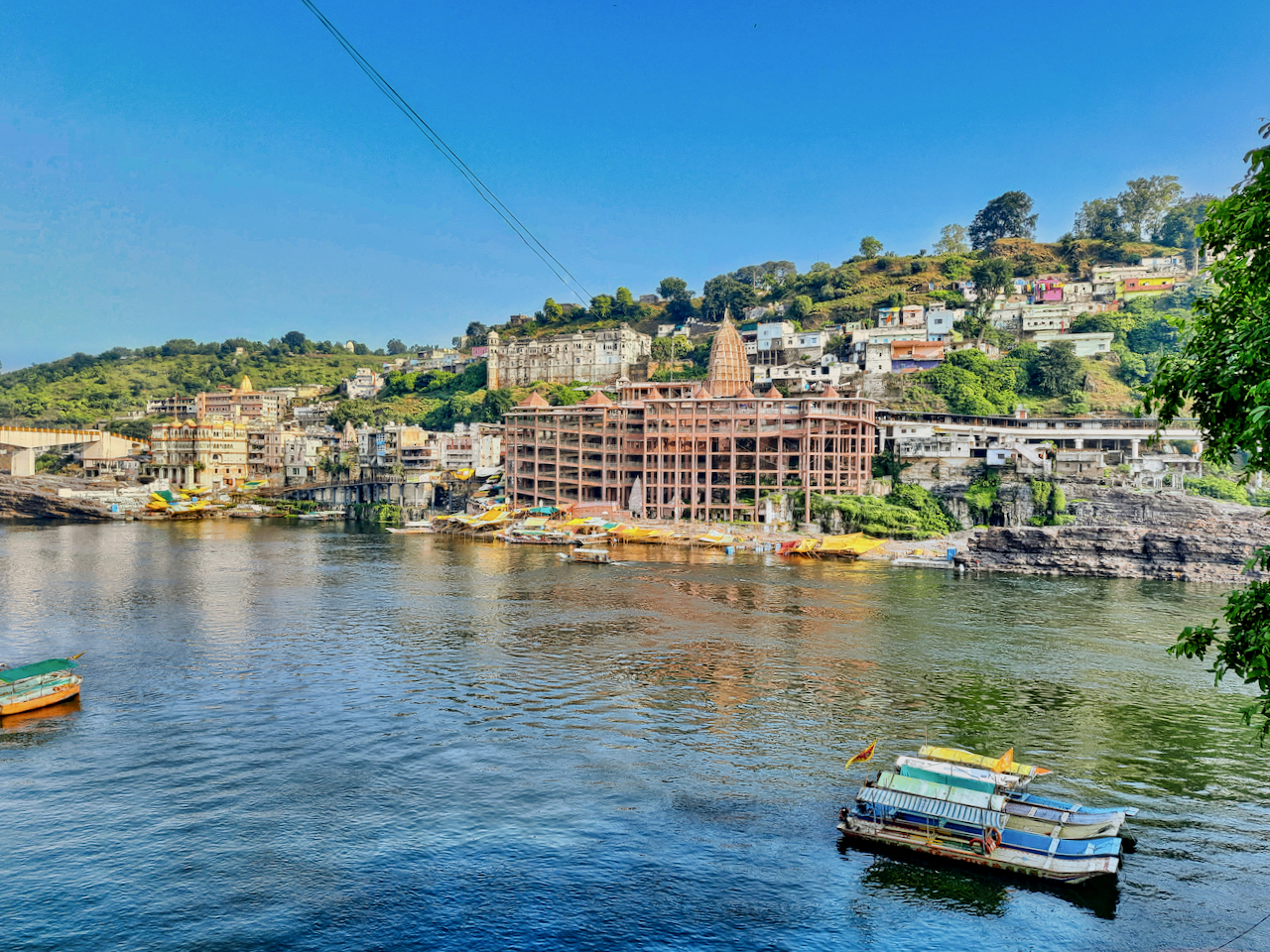

- Location in Madhya Pradesh, India Omkareshwar (India)
- Coordinates: 22.25°N 76.15°E
- Country: India
- State: Madhya Pradesh
- District: Khandwa
- Founder: King Onkar Bhil
- Named for: Omkareshwar jyotirlinga

Population
  - Total: 20,000

Languages
  - Official: Hindi
- Time zone: UTC+5:30 (IST)
- Postal code: 450554
- ISO 3166 code: IN-MP
- Vehicle registration: MP

Mandhata, also called Omkareshwar or Shivapuri and ancient Mahishmati, capital of Avanti Mahajanpada is a riverine island in the Narmada River in Khandwa district, Madhya Pradesh, India. Omkareshwar Jyotirlinga is situated on the southern part of the island. Omkareshwar Mandhata is located on the Mandhata hill on the banks of the Narmada.

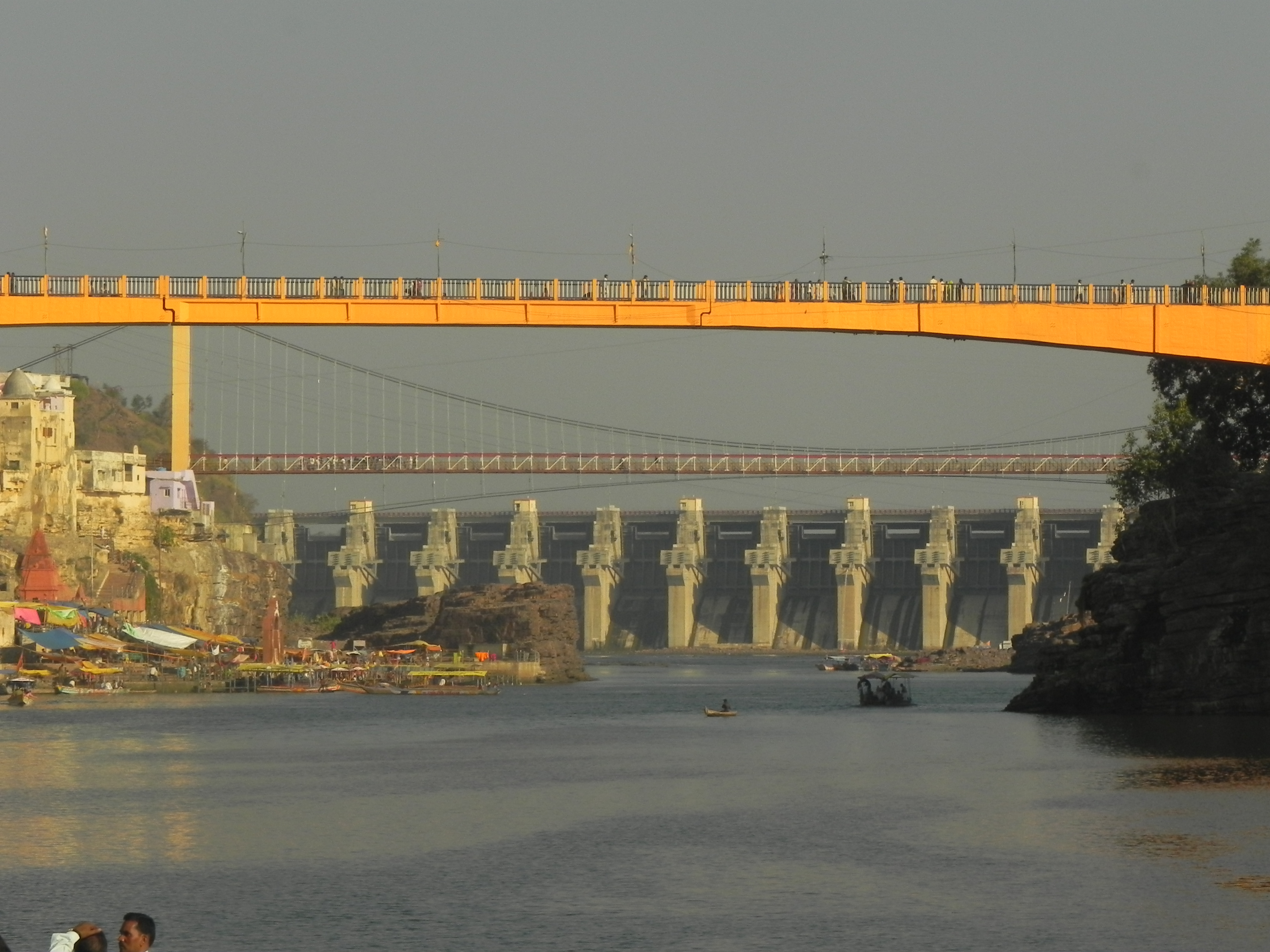
Omkareshwar Dam

The name "Omkareshwar" is due to the shape of the island, which appears to be Om. It is about two km (1.2 mi) long and 1 km (0.62 mi) wide. Local tradition reveals that King Mandhata paid homage to Shiva here and made this holy place his capital.

This place is situated at a distance of about 10 km from Omkareshwar Road railway station on Akola–Ratlam rail line.
