= Mundi =

Mundi (Moondi)
- City
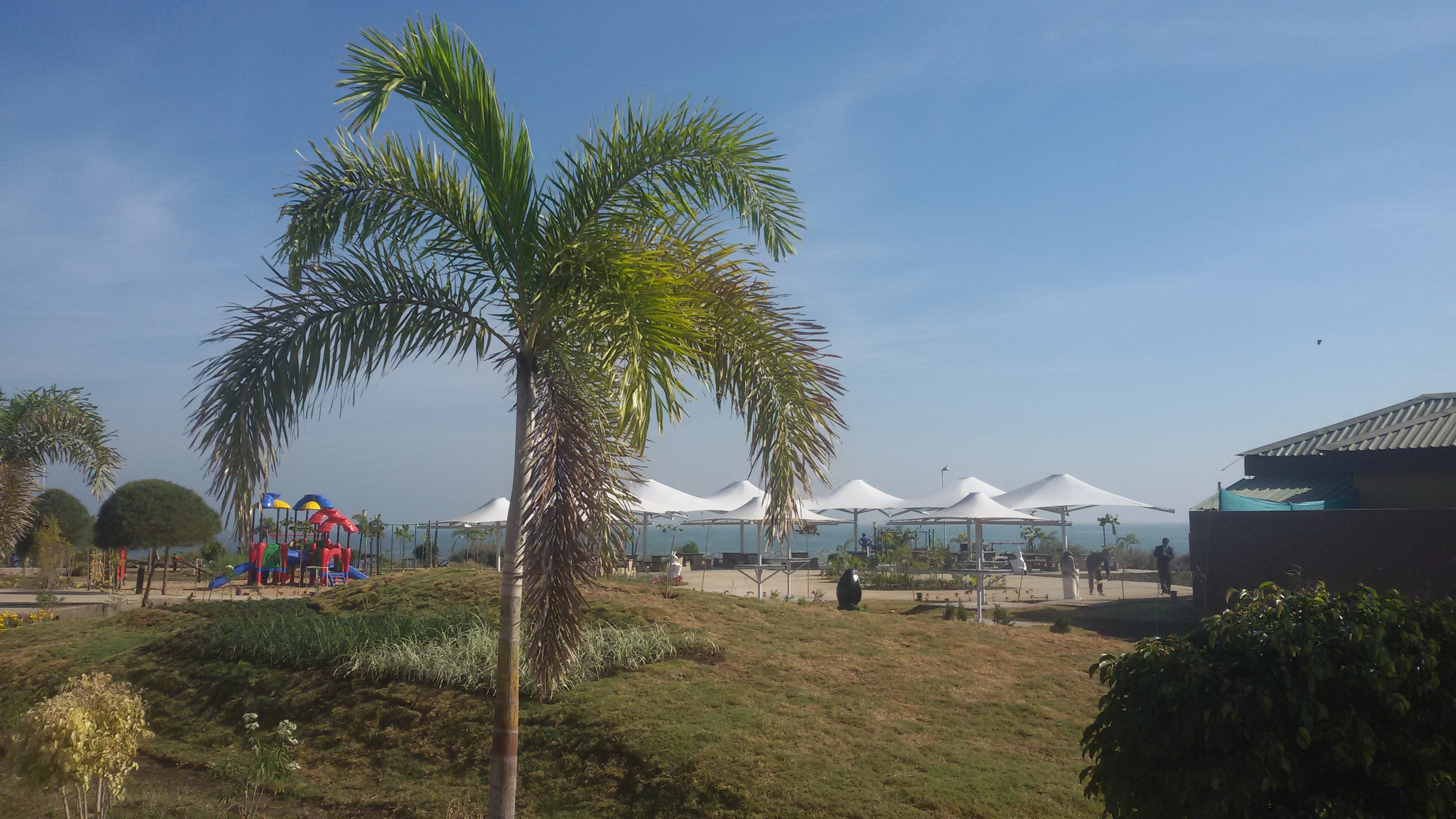
- Hanuwantiya Tourist Complex
- Nickname: Moondi
- Location of Mundi
- Coordinates: 22.07°N 76.5°E
- Country: India
- State: Madhya Pradesh
- Region: Nimar
- District: Khandwa District
- Established: 1000 year Old
- Named for: Mundari(Ring)

Government
  - Body: Nagar PaLlika
  - President: Jyotibala Rathore (2023-2027) BJP; Santosh Rathore (2014–2019)BJP; Asha Jain(2009–2014)BJP; Lakshaman Patel (2004–2009)INC; Santosh Rathore (1999–2004)BJP; Laxmichand GurjarINC
  - M.L.A: Narayan Patel (BJP)

Area
  - City: 25 km^{2} (9.7 sq mi)
  - Urban: 8 km^{2} (3.1 sq mi)

Population (2011)
  - City: 30,000
  - Rank: 2nd in Khandwa Dist.
- Demonym(s): Mundian's, Mundari
- Time zone: UTC+5:30 (IST)
- Vehicle registration: MP-12 (Khandwa R.T.O)
- Spoken Languages: Hindi, Nimari English
- Literacy: 75%
- Pin Code: 450112
- Telephone Code: +91-07326

Mundi is a City and tehsil in the Khandwa district of Nimar region in the Indian state of Madhya Pradesh.

Mundi is an ancient city, with many places of worship, like many other cities in India. Most temples have Hindu or Jain statues. The city is over a thousand years old and is surrounded by a forest in the Narmada river valley. It is 120 km (75 mi) from Indore, the commercial capital of the state. Shri Sant Singaji and Sant Bokhardas Gulabdas Dham & Hanuwantiya Tapu are located nearby. Kherkhali river (a part of River that flows at northern edge of the city. Presently, Mundi is a major Electric Hub City with a manufacturing unit at the Sant Singaji Thermal Power Plant and Indira Sagar Dam.

== Demographics ==
vPopulation in Mundi
Sex	Percent
Male	52.0%
Female	48.0%
Distribution of Population

As of 2011 India census, Mundi had a population of 30,000. Males constitute 52% of the population and females 48%. Mundi has an average literacy rate of 72%, higher than the national average of 59.5%: male literacy is 70%, and female literacy is 52%. In Mundi, 15% of the population is under 6 years of age.

Religions in Mundi
Religion	Percent
Hindus	70.0%
Muslims	25.0%
Jains	1.0%
Others†	4.0%
Distribution of religions

== Workers profile ==
Mundi has 34% (4397) population engaged in either main or marginal works. 54% male and 13% female population are working population. 49% of total male population are main (full time) workers and 5% are marginal (part time) workers. For women 9% of total female population are main and 4% are marginal workers.

== Location ==
Mundi is at 22.07°N 76.5°E. It has an average elevation of 300 metres (1000 feet).

== Fame ==
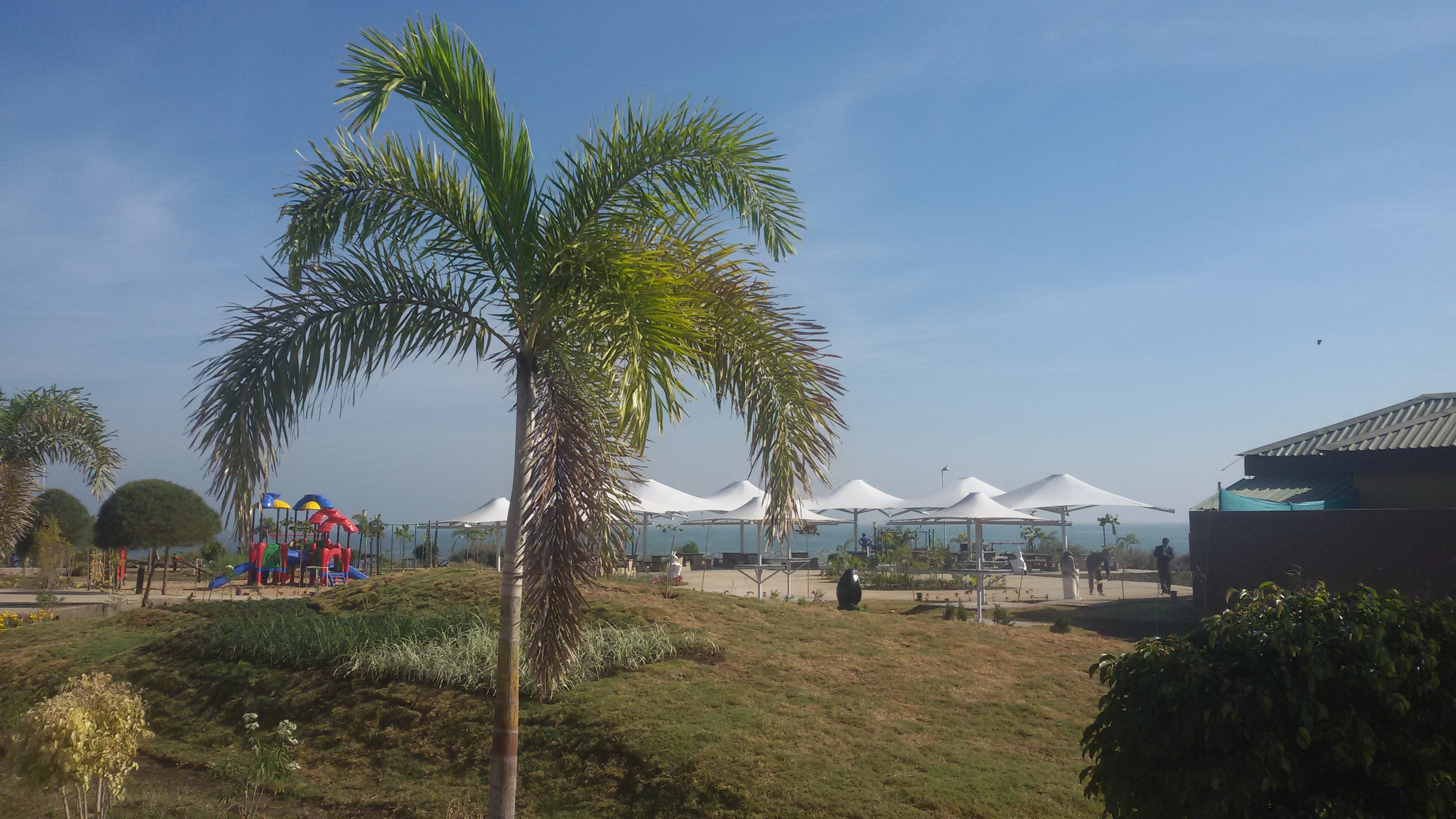
Hanuwantiya tourist complex

Mundi is known for its ancient time of Mahabharat Hindu Temples as Koteshwer & Loteshwer Mahadev & also for Maa Renuka Dham. The famous tourist places of Mundi are Singaji, St. Bokhardas Gulabdas Dham, Hanumantiya Island, a new place for adventurous water sports in the back waters of Indira Sagar Dam.

== History ==
The name of the city is derived from "Mundari" (meaning ring or circle shape). During the rise of Buddhism, the East Nimar region was included in the Avanti Kingdom under Chand Pradyota Mahesana, which was later added to the growing empire of Magadha by Shishunaga. From the early 2nd century BC to the late 15th century AD, the Nimar Region (earlier a part of Khandesh) was ruled by many emperors from many dynasties, which include Mauryas, Shungas, Satvahanas, Kardamakas, Abhiras, Vakatakas, Imperial Guptas, Kalchuris, Vardhanas (of Harsha Vardhana fame), Chalukyas, Rashtrakutas, Paramaras, etc. A well is situated at ‘’'Koteshwer'’’ or ‘’'Loteshwer'’’, created by Pandhawas. '’'Renuka Dham'’’ is another ancient temple. Since the mid-16th century to the early 18th century, the Nimar region, was under the rule of Aurangzeb, Bahadur Shah, Peshwas, Sindhia, Holkar, (Marathas) etc.

== Gallery ==
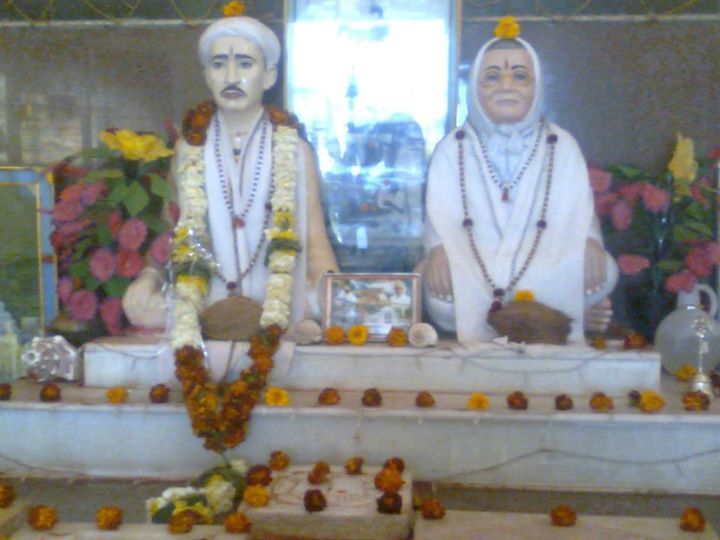
Saint Bokhardas Saint Gulabdas Mandir, Mundi

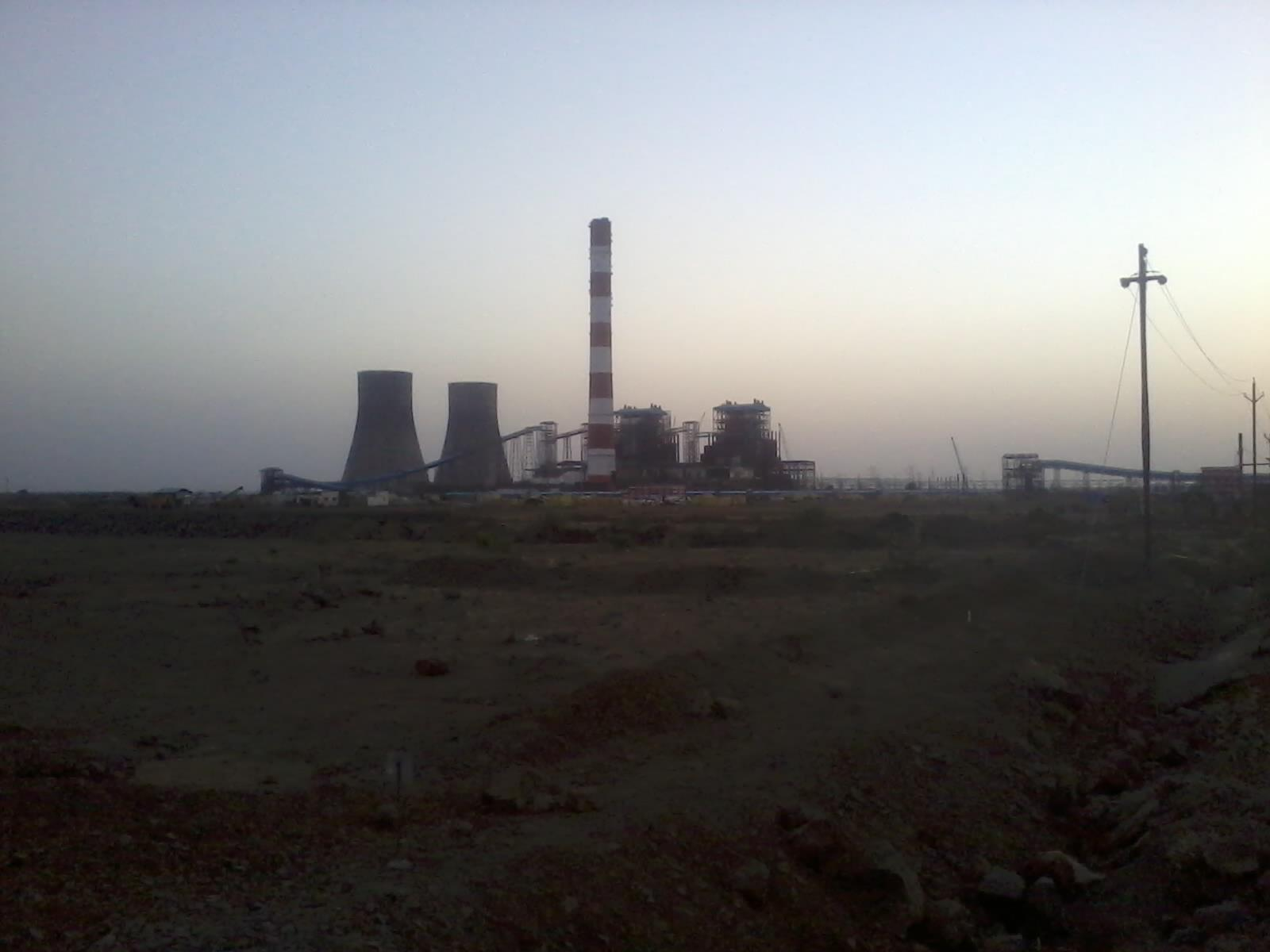
Saint Singaji Thermal Power Plant, Mundi

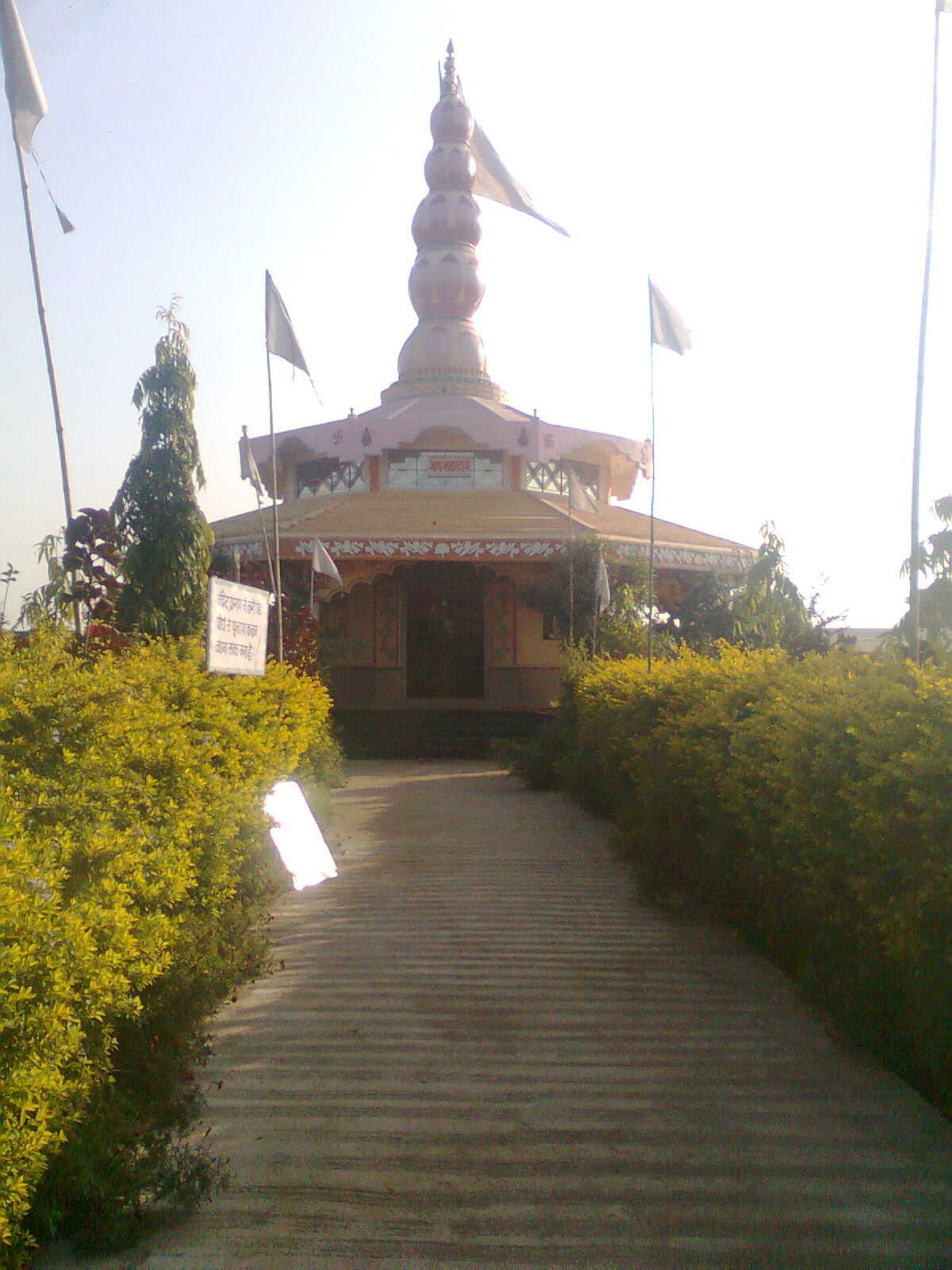
St.Board as or St.Gulabdas Baba Mandir, Mundi

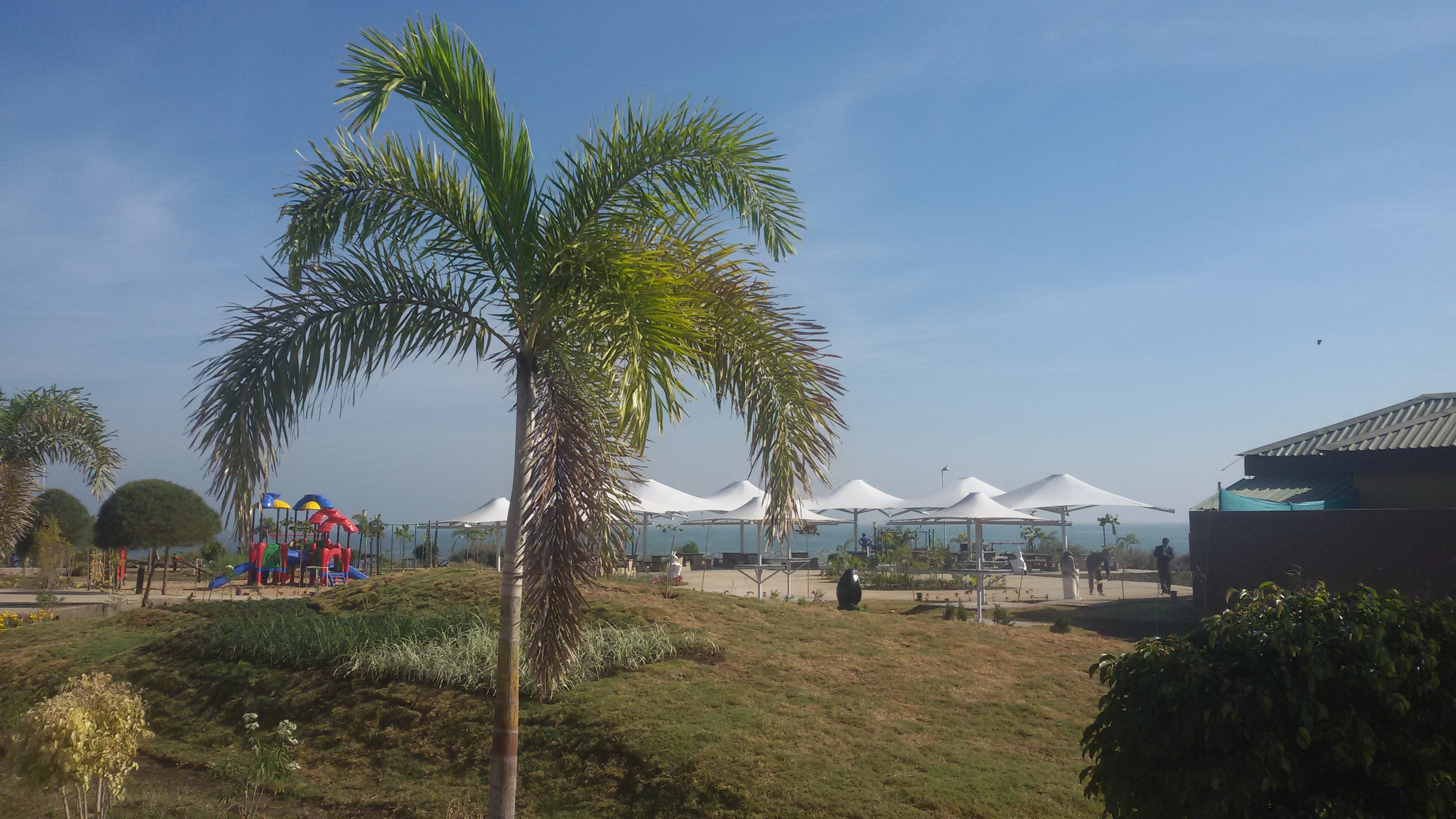
Hanuwantiya tourist complex

== Business and lifestyle ==
Surrounded by around 40 villages, business is mainly dependent on Agriculture. Most grown crops include Soybean, Cotton, Wheat. It is known as the Business City of Khandwa district. Festivals like Diwali, Dussehra, Raksha Bandhan, Eid, Holi, Guru Saptami, Gangor are celebrated with joy and excitement.

== Saint Singaji Thermal Power Plant ==
Shree Singaji Thermal Power Project Phase I is a 2 x 600 megawatt (MW) coal-fired power station. It is near Dongalia village Near by mundi in the district of Khandwa, Madhya Pradesh, India.

== Shivriya Township ==
It is a colony for people who work in the thermal power plant MPPGCL staff living in colony. Most of the officers on important posts in Singaji Thermal Power Plant reside in Shivariya Township.

== Industry ==
The Mundi area has a developing industrial sector because of the Saint Singaji Thermal Power Plant and the Indira Sagar Pariyojna. There are small and medium scale industries such as diary, poetry firm, cloth industry etc. and presently large scale industry are also in developing stage. Some industries established in an area which as Kaka Industries, Shree Vallabh Oil Mill, Bulandi Brick Industry, Ashutosh Cotton Mill.

== Tourism ==
Famous tourism spots are: * Sant Singaji Dham

- Hanuvantiya Water Sport Complex
- Sant Bokhardas Saint Gulabdas Baba Mandir
- Maa Renuka Dham
- Mata Mandir Mundi
- Koteshwer /Loteshwer Mandir

== Religious places ==
- Sant Singaji Dham
- Sant Bokhardas Saint Gulabdas Baba Mandir
- Maa Renuka Dham
- Mata Mandir Mundi
- Koteshwer /Loteshwer Mandir
- Shri Ram Mandir
- Maa Sheetala Mandir
- Maa Ganga Mandir
- Maa Narmada Mandir
- Vishnu Mandir
- Shivpuri Mahadev Mandir (oldest temple of mundi)
- Hanuman Mandir
- Sai Mandir Mundi

== Government offices ==
- Tehsil Office
- Nagar Pallika
- Lok Seva Kendra
- Rajshav Vibhag
- MPEB Office
- MPEB Office II 33KV
- Police Station
- Post office
- B.S.N.L Office

== Bus Stand ==
- Lal Bhahdur Shastri Bus Stand
- Mata Mandir Bus Stand

== Nagar Parishad ==
Mundi Nagar Parishad, with a population of about 30 thousand is Khandwa district's most populous Nagar Parishad located in the district of Khandwa (East Nimar) district in the state of Madhya Pradesh in India. The total geographical area of Mundi Nagar Parishad is 18 km2 and it is the 2nd biggest city by area in the district. The population density of the city is 735 persons per km2. There are 15 wards in the city, among them Mundi Ward No 01 is the most populous ward with a population of 1663, and Mundi Ward No 11 is the least populous ward with a population of 443. A total of 1826 families reside in the city council area.

District headquarter of the city is Khandwa which is 33 km away. Bhopal is the state headquarter of the city and is 225 km far from here. The yearly average rainfall of the city is 668.2 mm. The maximum temperature here reaches up to 48 °C and the minimum temperature goes down to 1 °C.

== Divisions ==
Mundi Area is divided into Rural or Urban Market Area :Mundi, Bir, Bangarda, Devla-Khutla. These Area are further divided into Rural or Urban Market's.

== MLAs ==
- Narayan Patel Gurjar (2023–2027) BJP
- Narayan Patel Gurjar (2020–2023) BJP
- Narayan Patel Gurjar (2018–2020) Congress
- Lokendrasingh Tomar BJP (2008–2013 व 2013–2018)
- Thakur Rajnarayan Singh Purni (1998–2008) INC
- Raghurajsingh Tomar (1990–1993 व 1993–1998) BJP
- Thakur Rajnarayan Singh Purni (1985–1990) INC
- Raghurajsingh Tomar (1977–1980, 1980–1985) BJP
- Raghunath Mandloi (1972–1977) BJP
- Radhakishan Bhagat (1967–1972) (Nirdali)

== Mundi Tehsil Banao Samiti ==
The demand for making Mundi a tehsil was a multi-purpose demand of the area. For which the work of connecting people on social networking sites was done by the youth of the city in 2015. Connecting with this campaign by NP, a meeting was organized in Rathore Dharamshala. In which both the parties Congress and BJP joined and the rural people of the area also participated.It was decided by the committee that the proposal letter of the villages joining the tehsil would be collected and sent to the government and the demand would be fulfilled. Santosh Rathore, Uttampal Singh Purani, Narayan Patel, Nitin Bhagat, Lokesh Rathore, Shreyansh Jain, Dharmendra Rathore, Amit Khanuja, Rajnarayan Mandloi, Gaurav Mahajan, Nikhil Solanki, etc., were completed by the members in collecting the proposal letter.In the 2018 assembly elections, this demand was placed by the state government by Narayan Patel from the Congress. In 2020, MLA Narayan Patel resigned after the demand was not fulfilled and this demand was again placed in front of the government after contesting from the BJP. On 24 September 2021, the order letter of Mundi tehsil was issued by the Chief Minister of the state and on 28 September 2021, the committee and the people of the city were conveyed.

== Education ==
The district is served well by several educational institutes, comprising both the private and public sectors. There is a government post-graduate degree college in the city.along with several English and Hindi medium schools and colleges. These institutions offer degrees in both the science and the arts. This district is the best educational district in the Nimar region.

=== Colleges ===
- I.T.I College
- Government Degree College

=== Government School ===
- CM Rise School
- Govt.Boy's Higher Sec. School
- Govt. Girl's Hr.Sec.School
- Janpad Hr.Sec.School

=== Private Schools ===
- Rewottama international school
- St. Mary's Convent High School
- Aasha Devi Public School
- Lions Hr.Sec.School
- Saraswati Vidya Mandir
- Model Public School
- Sanskar Public School
- Saraswati Shishu Vidya Mandir

== Health ==
- Government Hospital
- Gupta Nurshing Home
- Charak Hospital

== Banks ==
- Bank of India
- Narmada Jhabua Gramin Bank
- Nimar Sahkari Gramin Bank
- HDFC
- Dena Bank
- State Bank of India
- Union Bank of India

== Transport ==
Mundi is connected to SH-41 (Khandwa-Mundi-Ashta State Highway), SH-41A (Omkareshwer-Nagar-Punasa State Highway) and to Indore, Khandwa, Bhopal, Burhanpur, Nagpur, Barwaha etc. Indian Railways started Khandwa-Bir passenger to connect Khandwa railway junction to Mundi. More than 200 buses operate and provide road connectivity to major cities of the State. The local transport system which includes mini buses, tempos to provide connectivity to more than 40 nearby villages.
