= Punasa =

Town in Khandwa, Madhya Pradesh

- Town
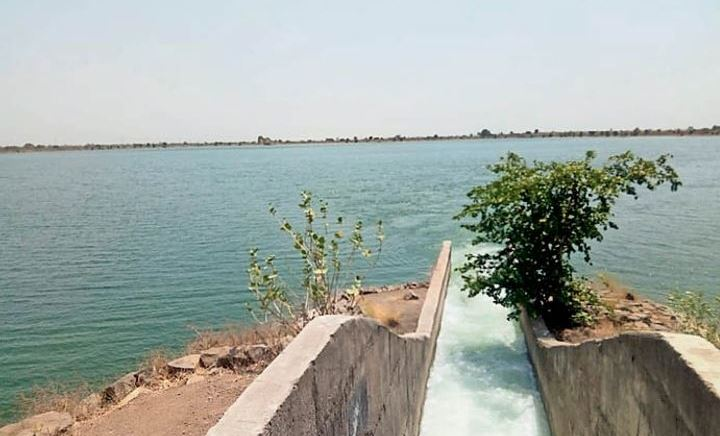
- Punasa Dam on Narmada River

- Location in Madhya Pradesh, India Punasa (India)
- Coordinates: 22.23°N 76.38°E
- Country: India
- State: Madhya Pradesh
- District: Khandwa

Government
  - Type: Nagar Parishad

Area
  - Total: 7.8 km^{2} (3.0 sq mi)
- Elevation: 244 m (801 ft)

Population (2011)
  - Total: 7,225
  - Density: 930/km^{2} (2,400/sq mi)

Languages
  - Official: Hindi
- Time zone: UTC+5:30 (IST)
- Vehicle registration: MP-12

Punasa is a town and a Nagar panchayat in Khandwa district of Madhya Pradesh, India. It is also a Tehsil Headquarter.

== Geography ==
Punasa is located at 22.23°N 76.38°E and has an average elevation of 244 m (801 ft).

Punasa is an ancient town, with many places of worship, like many other cities in India. The town is over a thousand years old and is surrounded by a forest in the Narmada river valley. It is 120 km (75 mi) from Indore, the commercial capital of the state.

== Demographics ==
It had a total population of 7,225 as per the 2011 Census of India.

== Indira Sagar Dam ==
The Indira Sagar Dam is a multipurpose project of the state Madhya Pradesh on the Narmada River at the town of Narmada Nagar, Punasa in the Khandwa district of Madhya Pradesh in India. The foundation stone of the project was laid by late Smt Indira Gandhi, former Prime Minister of India on 23 October 1984. The construction of the main dam started in 1992. The downstream projects of ISP are Omkareshwar, Maheshwar, and Sardar Sarovar Project. To build it, a town of 22,000 people and 100 villages were displaced.

== Transportation ==
Punasa is 55 km away from District Headquarters Khandwa and 115 km away from Division Headquarter Indore and 205 km away from state capital Bhopal.

Punasa is connected by private bus services to all nearest major cities.
