= Nimadi language =

Western Indo-Aryan language of India

Nimadi
- निमाड़ी
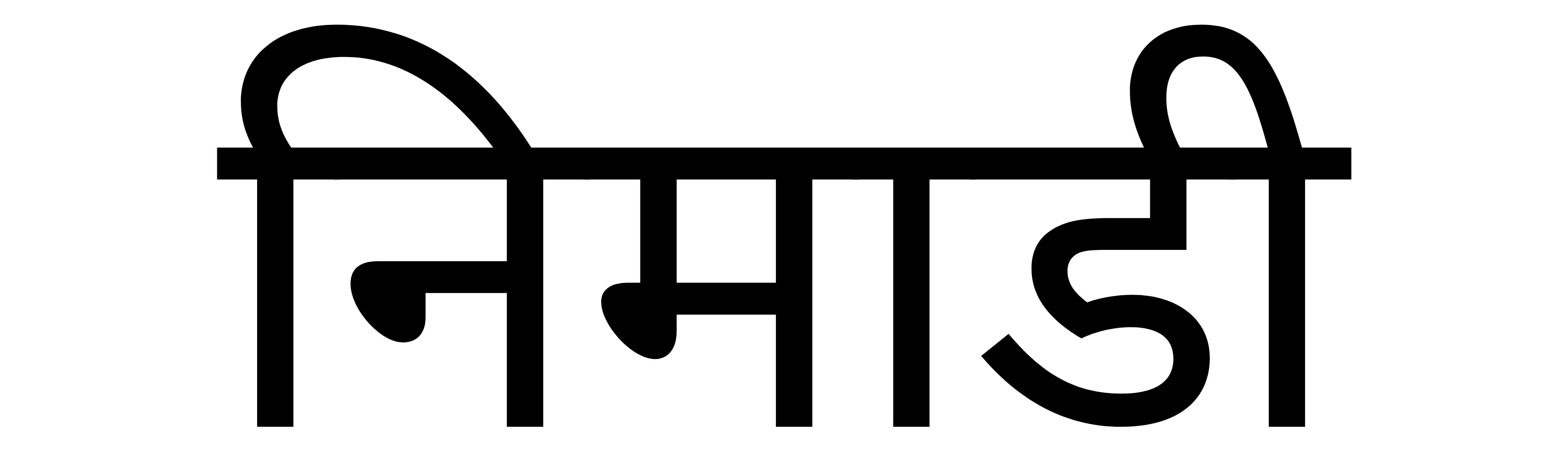
- The word "Nimadi" written in Devanagari script
- Native to: India
- Region: Nimar in Madhya Pradesh
- Native speakers: 2.31 million (2011 census); Census results conflate some speakers with Hindi.
- Language family: Indo-European: Indo-Iranian; Indo-Aryan; Western; Rajasthani; Nimadi
- Writing system: Devanagari

Language codes
- ISO 639-3: noe
- Glottolog: nima1243

Nimadi is a Western Indo-Aryan language spoken in the Nimar region of west-central India within the state of Madhya Pradesh. This region lies adjacent to Maharashtra and south of Malwa. The districts where Nimadi is spoken are: Barwani, Khandwa, Barwaha, Khargone, Burhanpur, Sanawad and southern most parts of Dhar, Harda and Dewas districts. It is classified as one of the distinct language of Rajasthani languages branch. The famous writers of Nimari were Gaurishankar Sharma, Ramnarayan Upadhyay, Surendra Khede, etc.

Nimari is mainly spoken in the districts of Khargone, Barwani, and Khandwa. Ramnarayan Upadhyay, Mahadeo Prasad Chaturvedi, Prabhakar Ji Dubey, Jeevan Joshi, and others have contributed significantly to its literature. "Ammar Bol" (a translation of the Bhagavad Gita), composed by Mahadeo Prasad Chaturvedi "Madhya," is considered the first epic in Nimari.

Prabhakar Ji Dubey was also honored by the President of India. He lived in the town of Barwaha, situated near Maheshwar and Omkareshwar (one of the Jyotirlingas). He performed in many stage dramas and was a disciple of Rama Dada, frequently visiting Khandwa. He is still remembered for songs like "Gammat" and "Swang." He also worked as a professional teacher. One of his books, "Thumka," was awarded by the Academy of Isuri. He died on 13 March 1997.
