= Khandwa district =

Coordinates: 21°49′48″N 76°20′24″E

- District of Madhya Pradesh
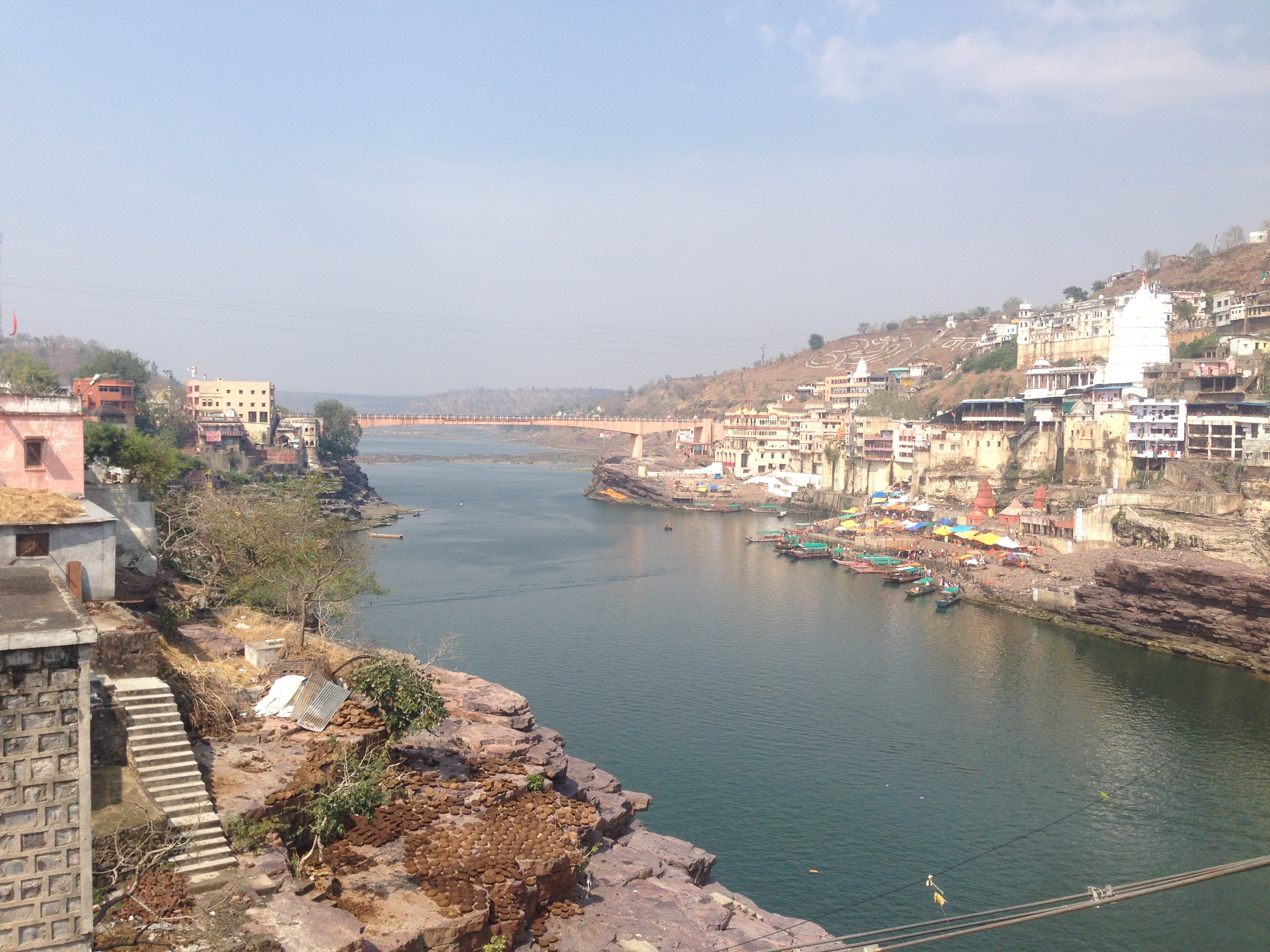
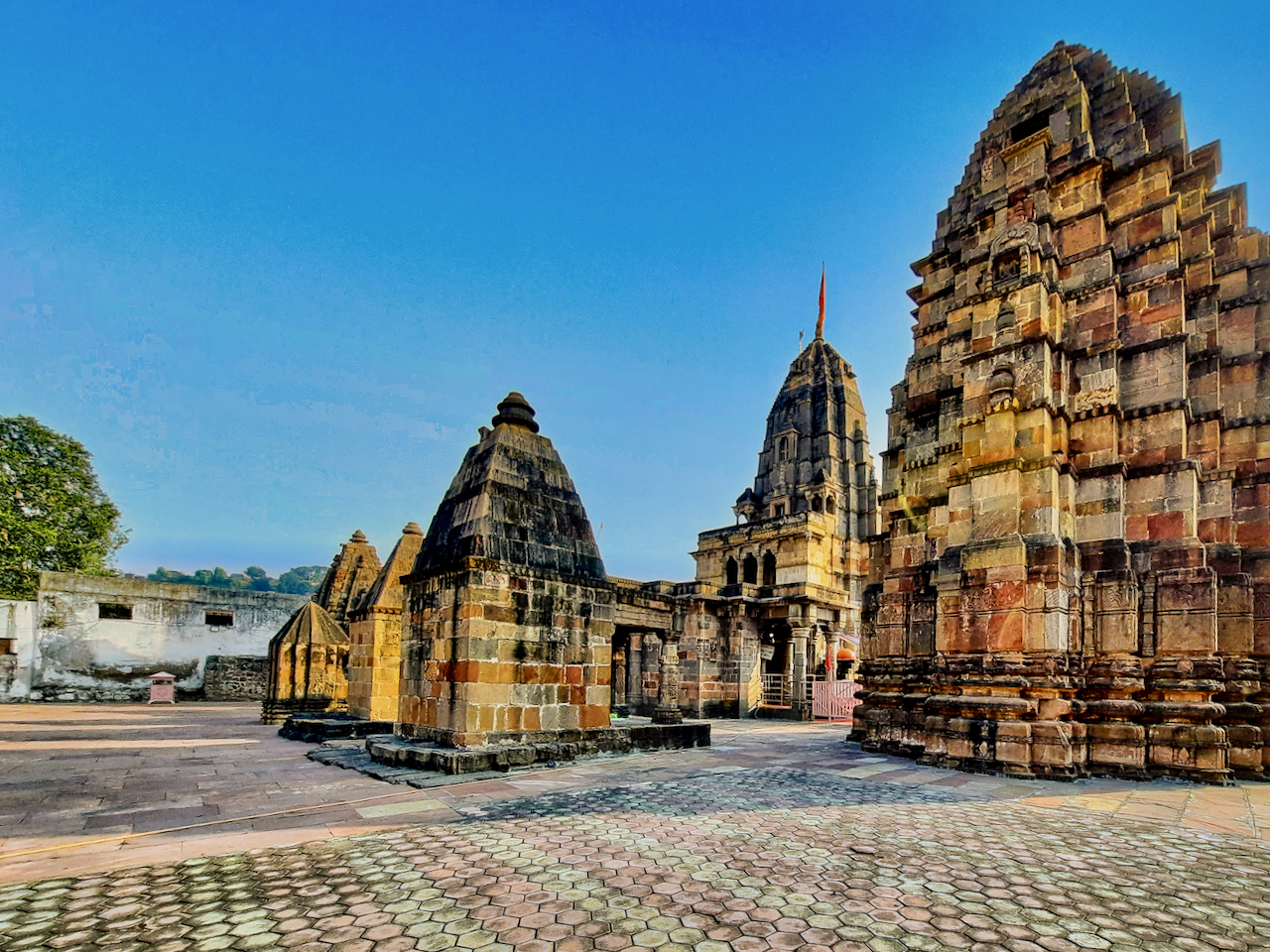
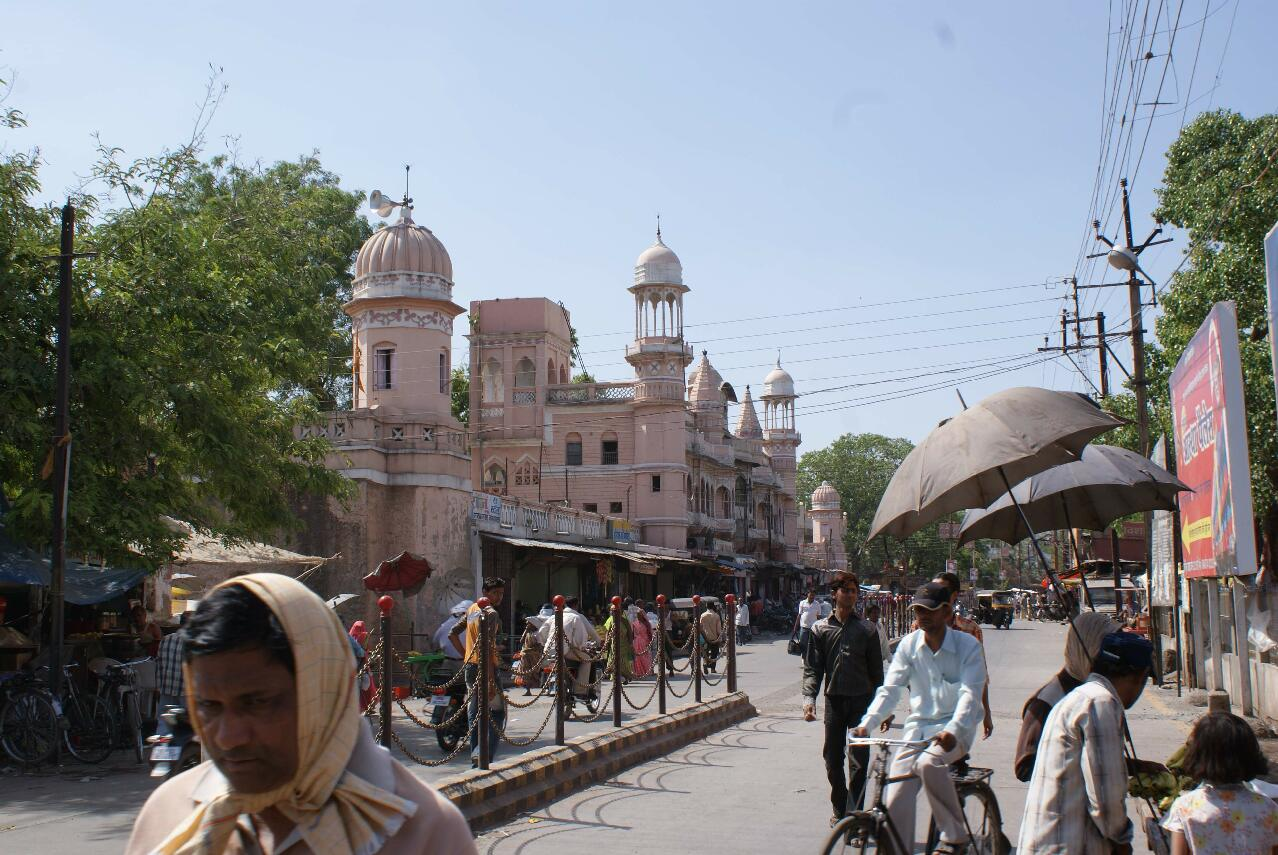
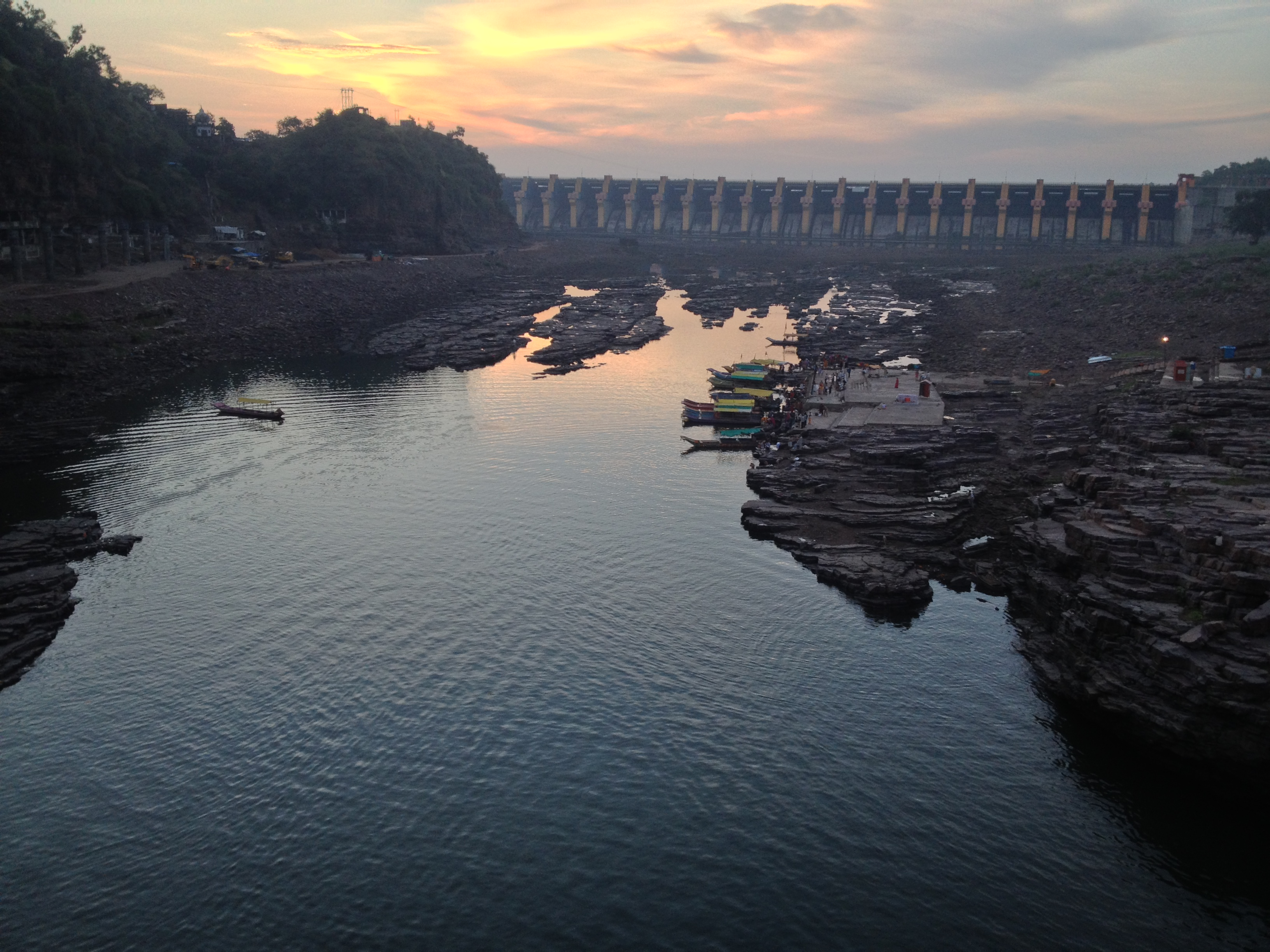
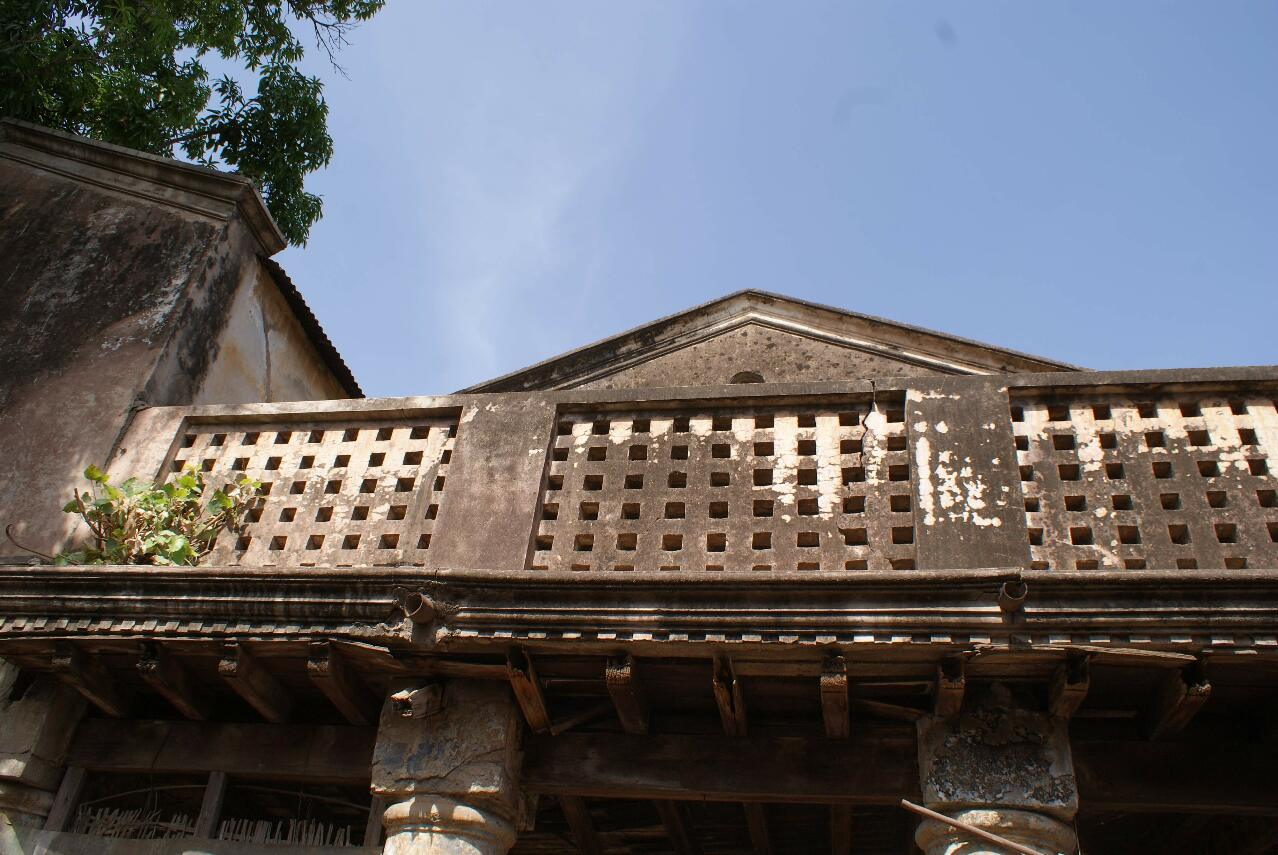
- Clockwise from top-left: Ghats of Mandhata, Mamleshwar temple, Omkareshwar Dam, Gauri Kunj, Khandwa railway station

- Location of Khandwa district in Madhya Pradesh
- Country: India
- State: Madhya Pradesh
- Division: Indore
- Headquarters: Khandwa
- Tehsils: 1. Khandwa; 2. Punasa; 3. Khalwa; 4. Mundi; 5. Harsud; 6. Pandhana; 7. Chhaigaon Makhan

Government
  - Lok Sabha constituencies: Khandwa
  - Vidhan Sabha constituencies: Mandhata (175); Harsud (176); Khandwa (177); Pandhana (178)

Area
  - Total: 8,307 km^{2} (3,207 sq mi)

Population (2011)
  - Total: 1,310,061
  - Density: 157.7/km^{2} (408.5/sq mi)

Demographics
  - Literacy: 67.53 per cent
  - Sex ratio: 944
- Time zone: UTC+05:30 (IST)
- Major highways: Khandwa-Indore State Highway; Khandwa-Mundi-Ashta State Highway; Khandwa-Amrawati Road
- Website: khandwa.nic.in

Khandwa district (Hindi pronunciation: [kʰəɳɖʋaː]), formerly known as the East Nimar district, is a district of the Madhya Pradesh state in central India. The city of Khandwa is the administrative headquarters of the district. Other notable towns in the district include Mundi, Harsud, Punasa, Pandhana and Omkareshwar.

== Geography ==
The district has an area of 6,206 km^{2} (2,396 sq mi), and a population 1,310,061 (2011 census). Khandwa District lies in the Nimar region, which includes the lower valley of the Narmada River, Kherkhali River, Choti Tawa River, Shiva River. The Narmada forms part of the northern boundary of the district, and the Satpura Range form the southern boundary of the district. Burhanpur District, to the south, lies in the basin of the Tapti River. The pass through the Satpuras connecting Khandwa and Burhanpur is one of the main routes connecting northern and southern India, and the fortress of Asirgarh, which commands the pass, is known as the "Key to the Deccan". Betul and Harda districts lie to the east, Dewas District to the north, and Khargone District to the west.

== History ==
Khandwa district was surrendered by the Marathas to the British Raj in 1818, and later became part of the Central Provinces and Berar. The area to the west, which forms the present Khargone district, was part of the princely state of Indore. After India's independence in 1947, the Central Provinces and Berar became the new Indian state of Madhya Pradesh.

The Khandwa district was known as "Nimar District" before 1956, when the state of Madhya Bharat to the west was merged with the state of Madhya Pradesh. Later it came to be called "East Nimar district", and a separate "West Nimar district" with headquarters at Khargone was established. The East Nimar district was part of the Nerbudda (Narmada) Division of the Central Provinces and Berar, which became the state of Madhya Bharat (later Madhya Pradesh) after India's independence in 1947. Khandwa was known as East Nimar until recently. Burhanpur District was separated from Khandwa District on 15 August 2003. Khandwa District is part of Indore Division.

== Economy ==
In 2006 the Ministry of Panchayati Raj named Khandwa one of the country's 250 most backward districts (out of a total of 640). It is one of the 24 districts in Madhya Pradesh currently receiving funds from the Backward Regions Grant Fund Programme (BRGF).

=== Agriculture and Industries ===
Khandwa's economy is dependent on agriculture, Due to its location in the Narmada basin, the land here is fertile, with several small scale industries in the cities of Khandwa. Some edible oil mill and Cotten Ginning mill located in Khandwa. The major cash crops of the Khandwa district are Onion, soybean, and Chana.

Sant Singaji Thermal Power Plant and Dada Dhuniwale Thermal Power Plant are located in Khandwa District.150 megawatt and 50 Megawatt tow Solar Power Plant also Situated near Khandwa.

- Omkareshwar Floating Solar Power Park: The 600 MW plant is being built on the Omakareshwar Dam's reservoir and the evacuating infrastructure is being provided by the state-owned Rewa Ultra Mega Solar Limited (RUMSL). Reportedly, this plan will be the largest floating solar power generation facility globally.

== Demographics ==
Historical population
Year	Pop.	±% p.a.
1901	210,188	—
1911	250,875	+1.79%
1921	254,443	+0.14%
1931	299,822	+1.65%
1941	329,540	+0.95%
1951	346,916	+0.52%
1961	446,906	+2.57%
1971	568,143	+2.43%
1981	729,781	+2.54%
1991	898,596	+2.10%
2001	1,078,251	+1.84%
2011	1,310,061	+1.97%

According to the 2011 census Khandwa District has a population of 1,310,061, This gives it a ranking of 374th in India (out of a total of 640). The district has a population density of 178 inhabitants per square kilometre (460/sq mi). Its population growth rate over the decade 2001–2011 was 21.44%. East Nimar has a sex ratio of 944 females for every 1,000 males, and a literacy rate of 67.53%. 19.80% of the population lives in urban areas. Scheduled Castes and Scheduled Tribes make up 11.95% and 35.05% of the population respectively.

Religions in Khandwa district (2011)
Religion	Percent
Hinduism	90.25%
Islam	8.88%
Other or not stated	0.87%

=== Languages ===
Languages of Khandwa district (2011)
1. Nimadi (40.6%)
2. Hindi (33.8%)
3. Korku (9.71%)
4. Urdu (3.20%)
5. Bhili (2.94%)
6. Bareli (2.06%)
7. Banjari (1.67%)
8. Gondi (1.24%)
9. Marathi (1.05%)
10. Bhilali (0.97%)
11. Others (2.73%)

At the time of the 2011 Census of India, 40.59% of the population in the district spoke Nimadi, 33.84% Hindi, 9.71% Korku, 3.20% Urdu, 2.94% Bhili, 2.06% Bareli, 1.67% Banjari, 1.24% Gondi, 1.05% Marathi and 0.97% Bhilali as their first language.

Languages spoken include Nimadi, a Bhil language with approximately 64 000 speakers, written in the Devanagari script.

== Cities of Khandwa ==
Major cities of Khandawa include-

- Khandwa
- punasa
- Mundi
- Harsud
- Pandhana
- Omkareshwar
- सन्त सिंगाजी
- Khalwa
- Deshgaon
- Chhaigaon Makhan

== Divisions ==
Khandwa district is divided into 8 sub-divisions: Khandwa, Mundi, Harsud, Pandhana, Khalwa, Punasa, Chhaigaon Makhan and Killod. These sub-divisions are further divided into 6 tehsils.

There are Four Vidhan Sabha constituencies in this district: Khandwa, Mandhata, Harsud, Pandhana.

== Notable people ==
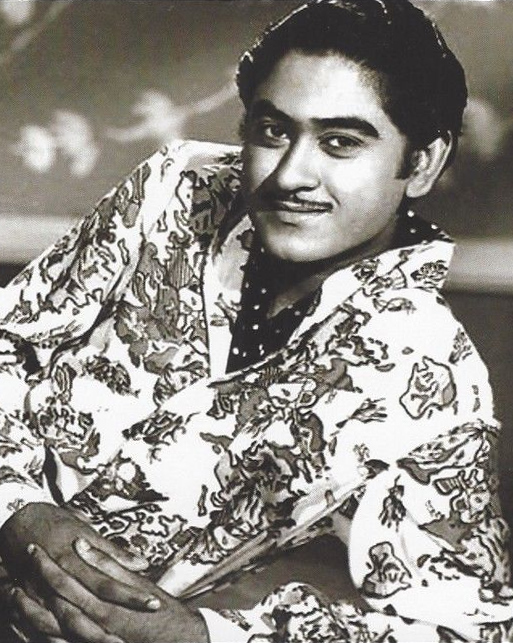
Kishore Kumar as a young man

- Ashok Kumar
- Kishore Kumar, singer and actor
- Anoop Kumar
- Bhagwantrao Mandloi, former Chief Minister of Madhya Pradesh
- Pt. Makhanlal Chaturvedi, Hindi poet & freedom fighter
- Shaan (singer)
- Saroo Brierley was born in Khandwa and lived there until about the age of five years when he was lost and adopted by a family in Australia

== Tourist places ==
- Omkareshwar
- Mandhata
- Scenic Sailani Island
- Khandwa Town
- Indirasagar Dam
- Sant Singaji Dham
- Shree Dadaji Dhuniwale Dham
- Jain Temple Sidhwarkut
- Khandwa Fort
- Hanumantiya lake and Island

== See also ==
- Mahishmati
