= Shyam Barde =

Indian politician

Shyam Barde (born 1976) is an Indian politician from Madhya Pradesh. He is an MLA from Pansemal Assembly constituency, which is reserved for Scheduled Tribe community, in Barwani District. He won the 2023 Madhya Pradesh Legislative Assembly election, representing the Bharatiya Janata Party.

== Early life and education ==
Barde is from Pansemal, Barwani District, Madhya Pradesh. He is the son of Kachrumal Barde. He completed his M.A. in Hindi Literature in 2002 at Government State College, Sendhwa.

== Career ==
Barde won from Pansemal Assembly constituency in the 2023 Madhya Pradesh Legislative Assembly election representing the Bharatiya Janata Party. He polled 97,181 votes and defeated his nearest rival, Chandrabhaga Kirade of the Indian National Congress, by a margin of 13,442 votes.
