= Rajpur, Madhya Pradesh Assembly constituency =

Constituency of the Madhya Pradesh legislative assembly in India

Coordinates: 21.94°N 75.14°E

Rajpur
- Constituency No. 188 for the Madhya Pradesh Legislative Assembly

Constituency details
- Country: India
- Region: Central India
- State: Madhya Pradesh
- District: Barwani
- Lok Sabha constituency: Khargone
- Established: 1957
- Reservation: ST

Member of Legislative Assembly
- 16th Madhya Pradesh Legislative Assembly
- Incumbent Bala Bachchan
- Party: Indian National Congress
- Elected year: 2023
- Preceded by: Devisingh Patel

Rajpur is one of the 230 Vidhan Sabha (Legislative Assembly) constituencies of the central Indian state of Madhya Pradesh.

It is located in Barwani district.

== Members of the Legislative Assembly ==
| Election | Name | Party |
|---|---|---|
| 1957 | Mangilal Tajsingh | Indian National Congress |
| 1962 | Devisingh Lonyaji | Bharatiya Jana Sangh |
| 1967 | B. Mahadu | Indian National Congress |
| 1972 | B. Mahadu | Indian National Congress |
| 1977 | Veersingh Devisingh | Indian National Congress |
| 1980 | Barkubhai Chouhan | Indian National Congress (I) |
| 1985 | Barkubhai Chouhan | Indian National Congress |
| 1990 | Diwan Singh Vitthal | Bharatiya Janata Party |
| 1993 | Bala Bachchan | Indian National Congress |
| 1998 | Bala Bachchan | Indian National Congress |
| 2003 | Diwansingh Patel | Bharatiya Janata Party |
| 2008 | Devisingh Patel | Bharatiya Janata Party |
| 2013 | Bala Bachchan | Indian National Congress |
| 2018 | Bala Bachchan | Indian National Congress |
| 2023 | Bala Bachchan | Indian National Congress |

== Election results ==
=== 2023 ===
2023 Madhya Pradesh Legislative Assembly election: Rajpur
| Party | Candidate | Votes | % | ±% |
|---|---|---|---|---|
| INC | Bala Bachchan | 100,333 | 47.75 | −0.24 |
| BJP | Antar Singh Patel | 99,443 | 47.33 | −0.14 |
| NOTA | None of the above | 1,683 | 0.8 | −1.08 |
| Majority | | 890 | 0.42 | −0.1 |
| Turnout | | 210,106 | 83.11 | +3.02 |
| INC hold | | Swing | | |

=== 2018 ===
2018 Madhya Pradesh Legislative Assembly election: Rajpur
| Party | Candidate | Votes | % | ±% |
|---|---|---|---|---|
| INC | Bala Bachchan | 85,513 | 47.99 | |
| BJP | Antersingh Devisingh Patel | 84,581 | 47.47 | |
| CPI | Vijay Chouhan | 2,411 | 1.35 | |
| NOTA | None of the above | 3,358 | 1.88 | |
| Majority | | 932 | 0.52 | |
| Turnout | | 178,176 | 80.09 | |
| INC hold | | Swing | | |

=== 2013 ===
2013 Madhya Pradesh Legislative Assembly election: Rajpur
| Party | Candidate | Votes | % | ±% |
|---|---|---|---|---|
| INC | Bala Bachchan | 82,167 | 49.39 | |
| BJP | Devisingh Patel | 70971 | 42.66 | |
| CPI | Jyoti Sukhlal Kamred | 4415 | 2.65 | |
| BSP | Ranchod Mavde | 1932 | 1.16 | N/A |
| Independent | Karan Daulatram | 1830 | 1.10 | |
| Independent | Ratansingh Subhan Mehta | 1824 | 1.10 | |
| NOTA | None of the Above | 3223 | 1.94 | |
| Majority | | 11196 | | |
| Turnout | | 166362 | 77.80 | |
| Swing to INC from BJP | | Swing | | |

== See also ==
Rajpur, Madhya Pradesh
