= Montu Solanki =

Indian politician

−

Montu Solanki (born 1982) is an Indian politician from Madhya Pradesh. He is an MLA from Sendhawa Assembly constituency, which is reserved for Scheduled Tribe community, in Barwani District. He won the 2023 Madhya Pradesh Legislative Assembly election, representing the Indian National Congress.

== Early life and education ==
Solanki is from Sendhawa, Barwani District, Madhya Pradesh. He is the son of Lakshman Singh. He studied Class 12 at Government Subhash Higher Secondary School, Indore, and passed the examination conducted by Madhyamik Shiksha Mandal, Bhopal in 2001. His wife Rajkala Solanki served as a district panchayat member.

== Career ==
Solanki won from Sendhawa Assembly constituency in the 2023 Madhya Pradesh Legislative Assembly election representing the Indian National Congress. He polled 106,136 votes and defeated his nearest rival, Antar Singh Arya of the Bharatiya Janata Party, by a margin of 1,677 votes.
