= Balsamud =

- village
- Location in Madhya Pradesh, India
- Coordinates: 21.82°N 75.18°E
- Country: India
- State: Madhya Pradesh
- District: Barwani

Government
  - Body: Gram panchayat

Languages
  - Official: Hindi
- Time zone: UTC+5:30 (IST)

Balsamud is a village in Rajpur Tehsil of Barwani district in the Indian state of Madhya Pradesh. Balsamud is noted for its Integrated Border Check Post at Agra Mumbai Highway run by the Government of Madhya Pradesh.

== Geography ==
Balsamud is located in the Narmada Valley, at 21.82°N 75.18°E. It has an average elevation of 306 metres (1,007 feet). Balsamud lies 45 km from District headquarters.
