= Julwania =

- City
- Location in Madhya Pradesh, India
- Coordinates: 21.86°N 75.20°E
- Country: India
- State: Madhya Pradesh
- District: Barwani

Government
  - MLA: Bala Bachchan (INC)

Languages
  - Official: Hindi
- Time zone: UTC+5:30 (IST)

Julwania is a Nagar Panchayat (Notified Area Council) city in Rajpur tehsil of Barwani district in the Indian state of Madhya Pradesh.

== Geography ==
Julwania is located in the Narmada Valley on crossroads of AB Road, part of AH47 & MP SH 26, at 21.86°N 75.20°E. It has an average elevation of 252 m (827 ft). Situated in the eastern area of Barwani district, Julwania lies 15 km (9.3 mi) from Rajpur & 48 km (30 mi) from Barwani.

== Demographics ==
Julwaniya Town has population of 6,529 of which 3,400 are males while 3 129 are females as per Population Census of India 2011.

Literacy rate of Julwaniya was 73.59 %. In Julwaniya Male literacy stands at 78.35 % while female literacy rate was 68.54 %.
