= Pansemal Assembly constituency =

Constituency of the Madhya Pradesh legislative assembly in India

Coordinates: 21.66°N 74.70°E

Pansemal
- Constituency No. 189 for the Madhya Pradesh Legislative Assembly

Constituency details
- Country: India
- Region: Central India
- State: Madhya Pradesh
- District: Barwani
- Lok Sabha constituency: Khargone
- Established: 2008
- Reservation: ST

Member of Legislative Assembly
- 16th Madhya Pradesh Legislative Assembly
- Incumbent Shyam Barde
- Party: Bharatiya Janata Party
- Elected year: 2023
- Preceded by: Chandrabhaga Kirade

Pansemal is one of the 230 Vidhan Sabha (Legislative Assembly) constituencies of Madhya Pradesh state in central India.

It is part of Barwani district. Shyam Barde is a current MLA of Pansemal.

== Members of the Legislative Assembly ==
Election	Member	Party
2008	Bala Bachchan	Indian National Congress]
2013	Diwansingh Patel	Bharatiya Janata Party
2018	Chandrabhaga Kirade	Indian National Congress
2023	Shyam Barde	Bharatiya Janata Party

== Election results ==
=== 2023 ===
2023 Madhya Pradesh Legislative Assembly election: Pansemal
Party	Candidate	Votes	%	±%
BJP	Shyam Barde	97,181	48.64	+8.59
INC	Chandrabhaga Kirade	83,739	41.91	−12.69
Independent	Ramesh Bhangi Chouhan	12,950	6.48	
AAP	Dayaram Jamsingh Dawar	2,409	1.21	+0.74
NOTA	None of the above	3,521	1.76	−0.54
Majority		13,442	6.73	−7.82
Turnout		199,800	77.81	−0.16
BJP gain from INC		Swing		

=== 2018 ===
2018 Madhya Pradesh Legislative Assembly election: Pathariya
Party	Candidate	Votes	%	±%
INC	Chandrabhaga Kirade	94,634	54.6	
BJP	Diwansingh S/O Viththal Patel	69,412	40.05	
BSP	Shreemati Durgabai Ratan Wasave	1,641	0.95	
NOTA	None of the above	3,994	2.3	
Majority		25,222	14.55	
Turnout		173,318	77.97	
INC gain from		Swing		

== See also ==
- Pansemal
