= Ozar =

Ozar may refer to:

- Ozar, Iran
- Ozar, Madhya Pradesh, in Barwani District of Madhya Pradesh, India
- Ozar, Nashik District, Maharashtra, India
- Ozar, Pune District famous for its Vigneshwara Temple, Ozar, India
- Ozar Hatorah, an Orthodox Jewish educational institution
- Louna Ozar (born 2004), Filipina–French basketball player

== See also ==
- Şemsa Özar (died 2026), Turkish development economist and academic
- Ozara (disambiguation)
