= Sendhawa Assembly constituency =

Constituency of the Madhya Pradesh legislative assembly in India

Coordinates: 21.69°N 75.10°E

Sendhawa
- Constituency No. 187 for the Madhya Pradesh Legislative Assembly

Constituency details
- Country: India
- Region: Central India
- State: Madhya Pradesh
- District: Barwani
- Lok Sabha constituency: Khargone
- Established: 1957
- Reservation: ST

Member of Legislative Assembly
- 16th Madhya Pradesh Legislative Assembly
- Incumbent Montu Solanki
- Party: Indian National Congress
- Elected year: 2023
- Preceded by: Gyarsilal Rawat

Sendhwa is one of the 230 Vidhan Sabha (Legislative Assembly) constituencies of Madhya Pradesh state in central India. It is part of Barwani district and is a reserved seat for the Scheduled Tribe community.

== Members of the Legislative Assembly ==
| Election | Name | Party |
|---|---|---|
| 1957 | Barku | Indian National Congress |
| 1962 | Rupsingh Abdu | Jana Sangh |
| 1967 | B. Moti | Jana Sangh |
| 1972 | Shobharam Patel | Indian National Congress |
| 1977 | Raoji Kaliji Singh Arya | Janata Party |
| 1980 | Shobharam Patel | Indian National Congress |
| 1985 | Bhaisingh Dabar | Indian National Congress |
| 1990 | Antar Singh Arya | Bharatiya Janata Party |
| 1993 | Gyarsilal Rawat | Indian National Congress |
| 1998 | Gyarsilal Rawat | Indian National Congress |
| 2003 | Antar Singh Arya | Bharatiya Janata Party |
| 2008 | Antar Singh Arya | Bharatiya Janata Party |
| 2013 | Antar Singh Arya | Bharatiya Janata Party |
| 2018 | Gyarsilal Rawat | Indian National Congress |
| 2023 | Montu Solanki | Indian National Congress |

== Election results ==
=== 2023 ===
2023 Madhya Pradesh Legislative Assembly election: Sendhawa
| Party | Candidate | Votes | % | ±% |
|---|---|---|---|---|
| INC | Montu Solanki | 106,136 | 48.28 | −2.79 |
| BJP | Antar Singh Arya | 104,459 | 47.51 | +5.0 |
| AAP | Er.Nansing Nawde | 4,155 | 1.89 | +1.35 |
| NOTA | None of the above | 5,098 | 2.32 | +0.28 |
| Majority | | 1,677 | 0.77 | −7.79 |
| Turnout | | 219,848 | 77.29 | +0.99 |
| INC hold | | Swing | | |

=== 2018 ===
2018 Madhya Pradesh Legislative Assembly election: Sendhawa
| Party | Candidate | Votes | % | ±% |
|---|---|---|---|---|
| INC | Gyarsilal Rawat | 94,722 | 51.07 | |
| BJP | Antarsingh Arya | 78,844 | 42.51 | |
| CPI | Babulal More | 3,080 | 1.66 | |
| NOTA | None of the above | 3,782 | 2.04 | |
| Majority | | 15,878 | 8.56 | |
| Turnout | | 185,468 | 76.3 | |
| INC gain from | | Swing | | |

== See also ==
- Sendhwa
