= Ozar, Madhya Pradesh =

Ozar
- village
- Location in Madhya Pradesh, India
- Coordinates: 21.82°N 75.21°E
- Country: India
- State: Madhya Pradesh
- District: Barwani

Languages
  - Official: Hindi
- Time zone: UTC+5:30 (IST)
- ISO 3166 code: IN-MP

Ozar, Madhya Pradesh is a village in Rajpur tehsil of Barwani district in the Indian state of Madhya Pradesh.

== Geography ==
Ozar is located in the Narmada Valley, at 21.82°N 75.21°E. Ozar lies 46 km (29 mi) from Barwani & 17 km (11 mi) from Rajpur.

== Demographics ==
As of the 2011 Census of India, Ozar had a population of 6,902. Males constitute 51% of the population and females 49%. Ozar has an average literacy rate of 62%, higher than the national average of 59.5%: male literacy is 56%, and female literacy is 44%. In Ozar, 15% of the population is under 6 years of age.
