= Gyarsilal Rawat =

Indian politician

Member of the Madhya Pradesh Legislative Assembly
- Incumbent
- Assumed office 1993-2003
- Constituency: Sendhwa Madhya Pradesh

Member of the Zila Panchayat
- Incumbent
- Assumed office Feb. 2005-till date
- Constituency: Ward no. 10

Personal details
- Born: 1 July 1962; Gram Hingwa, Warla -Balwadi, Dist.-Barwani, Madhya Pradesh
- Spouse: Latabai Rawat (President of ZP)
- Children: Rakesh

Gyarsilala Rawat is a member of Indian National Congress. He is a former Member of the Madhya Pradesh Legislative Assembly two-times. Rawat is a current ZP Member of Zila Panchayat Barwani. His wife Mrs. Lata bai Rawat is also a current ZP member and President of District Council Barwani Madhya pradesh.
