= Pati, Barwani =

Pati
- village
- Location in Madhya Pradesh, India Pati (India)
- Coordinates: 21.94°N 75.74°E
- Country: India
- State: Madhya Pradesh
- District: Barwani

Languages
  - Official: Hindi
- Time zone: UTC+5:30 (IST)
- ISO 3166 code: IN-MP
- Vehicle registration: MP

Pati, Barwani is a village & Tehsil in Barwani district in the Indian state of Madhya Pradesh. In 2014, Pati was selected by Ministry of Tribal Affairs among 10 tribal blocks in the country, to introduce tribal welfare scheme known as Van Bandhu Kalyan Yojana launched by Arun Jaitley, cabinet minister with Government of India.

== Geography ==
Pati is located in the Narmada Valley at 21.94°N 75.74°E. It has an average elevation of 246 metres (810 feet). Pati lies 23 km from Barwani & is a Tehsil of Barwani district.
