= Palsud =

Town in Madhya Pradesh, India

- Town
- Location in Madhya Pradesh, India
- Coordinates: 21.82°N 74.96°E
- Country: India
- State: Madhya Pradesh
- District: Barwani

Population (2011)
  - Total: 10,113

Languages
  - Official: Hindi, Nimari
- Time zone: UTC+5:30 (IST)
- PIN: 451447

Palsud is a town and a Nagar Parishad in the Barwani District of Madhya Pradesh, Central India. It is entirely located in the Nimar region.

== Geography ==
Palsud is located at 21.82°N 74.96°E and has an average elevation of 508 m (1,667 ft). It is in the Satpura mountain range on the banks of the Goi River.

== Demographics ==
According to the 2011 Census of India, Palsud has a population of 10,113, with 5,207 males and 4,906 females. Children aged 0-6 make up 1,670 individuals, accounting for 16.51% of the total population.

== Educational organizations ==
There are number of educational institutions in Palsud, such as Government College, Palsud, and a Government Boys and Government Girls schools.

== Transport ==
Palsud is connected with mejor highway MP State Highway 39A, Barwani is 35 km away from Palsud. Palsud is connected by private bus services to all nearest major cities.
