= Ozara =

Ozara may refer to:

- Ozara, Abia State, in Nigeria
- Ozara, Enugu State, in Nigeria
- Ozara, Imo State, in Nigeria

== See also ==
- Ozar (disambiguation)
- Ozora, a village in Tolna County, Hungary
