= Sendhwa tehsil =

Sendhwa Tehsil सेंधवा तहसील
- Tehsil
- Location in Madhya Pradesh
- Coordinates: 21°41′42″N 075°05′33″E
- Country: India
- State: Madhya Pradesh
- District: Barwani district

Government
  - Type: Panchayat Samiti
  - Body: Council

Area
  - Tehsil: 815.78 km^{2} (314.97 sq mi)
  - Rural: 815.78 km^{2} (314.97 sq mi)

Population (2011)
  - Tehsil: 303,554
  - Density: 372.10/km^{2} (963.74/sq mi)

Languages
  - Official: Hindi
- Time zone: UTC+5:30 (IST)
- Postal code (PIN): 451666
- Area code: 07281
- ISO 3166 code: MP-IN
- Vehicle registration: MP 46
- No. of Villages: 78

Sendhwa Tehsil is an administrative subdivision (tehsil or tahsil) in Barwani District, Madhya Pradesh (state) of India. Its headquarters is in the town of Sendhwa. Sendhwa is the biggest revenue generating tehsil in the Barwani District. Sendhwa Tehsil has the highest population of any tehsil in Barwani district.

== History ==
The fort and town of Sendhwa gave their name to the area, that was a tehsil under the

On 15 December 2010, Warla Tehsil was separated from Sendhwa Tehsil.

== Geography ==
Sendhwa Tehsil is southwest of the district headquarters, Barwani. It is bounded by Warla Tehsil to the south, Niwali Tehsil to the east, and Rajpur Tehsil to the north, all of Barwani District, and by Bhagwanpura Tehsil of Khargone District (West Nimar District) to the west.

=== Settlements ===
As of the 2011 Census of India, Sendhwa Tehsil had one statutory town (nagar palika), Sendhwa, and seventy-eight villages, one of which was uninhabited.

== Economy ==
The tehsil is primarily agricultural and forest lands. Mechanised farming has only been recently introduced. Cotton is a big crop, as are pulses, such as mung beans and moth beans. Other crops include wheat, sorghum (jowar), maize, millet (kodo-kutki), especially pearl millet (bajra), rapeseed (canola), mustard, and urd and other pulses (gram).

Regular markets are held in the town of Sendhawa and the villages of Chacria (Chachariya Pati), Dhanori, and Zopali (Jhopali, Jopali). The village of Babdd Bhagoriya has a once-a-year market and festival.

The only real industry is cotton processing.

== Demographics ==
Sendhwa Tehsil had 303,554 people as of the 2011 census, not including the 56,485 in the town of Sendhwa; for a total of 360,039.
