= Pipri Buzurg, Madhya Pradesh =

Pipri Buzurg
- Village
- Location in Madhya Pradesh, India
- Coordinates: 21.93°N 75.13°E
- Country: India
- State: Madhya Pradesh
- District: Barwani
- Tehsil: Rajpur

Government
  - Type: Gram Panchayat
  - Body: Bala Bachchan (MLA) Chetan Agrawal
- Elevation: 225 m (738 ft)

Population (2011)
  - Total: 1,838(955-male) (881-female)

Languages
  - Official: Hindi
- Time zone: UTC+5:30 (IST)
- PIN: 451449
- Telephone code: 07284
- ISO 3166 code: IN-MP
- Vehicle registration: MP46

Pipri Buzurg is a village and a Gram Panchayat in Barwani district in the Indian state of Madhya Pradesh.

== Geography ==
Pipri Buzurg is located at 21.93°N 75.13°E. It has an average elevation of 225 metres (738 feet). The total area of village is 920.98 hectares.

== Demographics ==
As of 2001 India census, Rajpur had a population of 17,913. Males constitute 51% of the population and females 49%. Rajpur has an average literacy rate of 59%, lower than the national average of 59.5%: male literacy is 68%, and female literacy is 49%. In Raj.pur, 17% of the population is under 6 years of age.
