= Anjad =

- City
- Location in Madhya Pradesh, India Anjad (India)
- Coordinates: 22.03°N 75.05°E
- Country: India
- State: Madhya Pradesh
- District: Barwani

Population (2011)
  - Total: 37,123

Languages
  - Official: Hindi
- Time zone: UTC+5:30 (IST)
- ISO 3166 code: IN-MP
- Vehicle registration: MP 46

Anjad is a City and a Tehsil in Barwani district in the state of Madhya Pradesh, India.Anjad is famous for the business of cotton and Gining industries, gold and silver, and ready made garments and most famous for the temple of Nagari Mata.

== Geography ==
Anjad is located in the Narmada Valley, at 22.03°N 75.05°E. It has an average elevation of 151 metres (495 feet).

== Demographics ==
As per Census of India 2011, Anjad city has population of 26,289 of which 13,229 are males and 13,060 are females. The population of children between age 0-6 is 3787 which is 14.41% of total population.

== Administration and Government ==
Anjad is a Nagar Panchayat city in district of Barwani, Madhya Pradesh. The Anjad city is divided into 15 wards for which elections are held every 5 years.

Anjad Nagar Panchayat has total administration over 5,085 houses to which it supplies basic amenities like water and sewerage. It is also authorize to build roads within Nagar Panchayat limits and impose taxes on properties coming under its jurisdiction.

== Economy of Anjad ==
Anjad is an industrial center of Barwani district, it has several cotton ginning factories, a large market for readymade garments and gold and silver jewellery. Cotton is mainly cultivated in this area. This area is mainly located in the cotton growing region of Maharashtra.

== Place of Attraction ==
Nagari Mata is situated on the peak of Satpura near Anjad. There is an ancient temple of Badi Mata and Chhoti Mata on the mountain peak covered with natural beauty. Thousands of devotees throng there every year during Navratri. Devotees come from far and wide to worship the Mother Goddess.

== Transportation in Anjad ==
Anjad is located on NH 347B it connects it from Barwani and Khargone. Anjad is connected by private bus services to all nearest major cities.
