= Koshimbi =

Village in Maharashtra

- village
- Location in Maharashtra, India Koshimbi (India)
- Coordinates: 19.3809648°N 73.2219811°E
- Country: India
- State: Maharashtra
- District: Thane
- Taluka: Bhiwandi
- Elevation: 27 m (89 ft)

Population (2011)
  - Total: 1,409
- Time zone: UTC+5:30 (IST)
- 2011 census code: 552618

Koshimbi is a village in the Thane district of Maharashtra, India. It is located in the Bhiwandi taluka. It lies on the Mumbai Nashik Expressway.

== Demographics ==
According to the 2011 census of India, Koshimbi has 307 households with 1409 people (including 704 males and 705 females).
