= NH 3 =

NH3, NH-3, NH_{3} or NH 3 may refer to:

- Ammonia (chemical formula NH_{3})
- National Highway 3 (India)
- National Highway 3 (India, old numbering)
- New Hampshire Route 3
- New Hampshire's 3rd congressional district
