= Second Digvijaya Singh ministry =

Digvijaya Singh ministry
- Ministry of Madhya Pradesh
- Date formed: 8 December 1998
- Date dissolved: 8 December 2003

People and organisations
- Chief Minister: Digvijaya Singh
- Member party: Indian National Congress
- Status in legislature: Majority government

History
- Election: 1998 Madhya Pradesh Legislative Assembly election
- Outgoing election: 2003 Madhya Pradesh Legislative Assembly election
- Predecessor: First Digvijaya Singh ministry
- Successor: Uma Bharti ministry

Digvijaya Singh Ministry (1998–2003) was the Council of Ministers in the Madhya Pradesh Legislative Assembly headed by Chief Minister Digvijaya Singh.

== Council of Ministers ==
| Name | Office | Portfolio | Took Office | Left Office | Party |
|---|---|---|---|---|---|
| Digvijaya Singh | Chief Minister | | 8 December 1998 | 8 December 2003 | INC |
| Bala Bachchan | Minister of State | Tribal Affairs Department | 8 December 1998 | 2000 | INC |
| Bala Bachchan | Minister of State with Independent Charge | Youth & Sport Affairs | 2000 | 26 March 2002 | |
| Bala Bachchan | Cabinet Minister | Health and Family Welfare | 26 March 2002 | 8 December 2003 | INC |
| Jamuna Devi | Cabinet Minister | Women and Child Welfare | 8 December 1998 | 8 December 2003 | INC |
| Urmila Singh | Cabinet Minister | Tribal Welfare | 8 December 1998 | 8 December 2003 | INC |
| Col Ajay Narayan Mushran | Cabinet Minister | Women and Child Welfare | 8 December 1998 | 8 December 2003 | INC |
| Nand Kumar Patel | Cabinet Minister | Home and Aviation | 8 December 1998 | 8 December 2003 | INC |
| Narendra Nahata | Cabinet Minister | Commerce and Industries | 8 December 1998 | 8 December 2003 | INC |
| Mahendra Singh Kalukheda | Cabinet Minister | Agriculture, Co-operation and Ayacut | 8 December 1998 | 8 December 2003 | INC |
| Subhash Kumar Sojatia | Cabinet Minister | Public Health and Welfare, Medical Education | 8 December 1998 | 8 December 2003 | INC |
| Deepak Saxena | Cabinet Minister | Public Health Engineering | 8 December 1998 | 8 December 2003 | INC |
| Hukum Singh Karada | Cabinet Minister | Energy | 8 December 1998 | 8 December 2003 | INC |
| Indrajit Kumar Patel | Cabinet Minister | Housing and Environment | 8 December 1998 | 8 December 2003 | INC |
| Ravindra Choubey | Cabinet Minister | General Administration, Public Relations, and Public Grievances | 8 December 1998 | 8 December 2003 | INC |
| Satyanarayan Sharma | Cabinet Minister | Commercial Taxes, including Excise | 8 December 1998 | 8 December 2003 | INC |
| Ajay Singh Rahul Bhaiya | Cabinet Minister | Panchayat and Rural Development, Tourism and Culture | 8 December 1998 | 8 December 2003 | INC |
| Ramchandra Singh Deo | Cabinet Minister | Water Resources (Irrigation) Development | 8 December 1998 | 8 December 2003 | INC |
| Vijayalaxmi Sadho | Cabinet Minister | Narmada Valley Development Authority | 8 December 1998 | 8 December 2003 | INC |
| Shravan Patel | Cabinet Minister | Public Works, Sports and Youth Welfare | 8 December 1998 | 8 December 2003 | INC |
| Prem Sai Singh | Cabinet Minister | Revenue and Rehabilitation | 8 December 1998 | 8 December 2003 | INC |
| Mahendra Bodh | Cabinet Minister | Education, Higher Education, Mining | 8 December 1998 | 8 December 2003 | INC |
| Ratnesh Soloman | Cabinet Minister | Forest | 8 December 1998 | 8 December 2003 | INC |
| Krishna Kumar Gupta | Cabinet Minister | Manpower Planning | 8 December 1998 | 8 December 2003 | INC |
| Chanesh Ram Ratiya | Cabinet Minister | Animal Husbandry and Fisheries | 8 December 1998 | 8 December 2003 | INC |
| Dhanesh Patila | Cabinet Minister | Scheduled Caste Welfare, Dairy Development, and Jails | 8 December 1998 | 8 December 2003 | INC |
| Doman Singh Nagpure | Minister of State with Independent Charge | Labour, Social Welfare, and Backward Classes Welfare | 8 December 1998 | 8 December 2003 | INC |
| Arif Aqueel | Minister of State with Independent Charge | Minorities Welfare, Bhopal Gas Tragedy Relief and Rehabilitation, and Food | 8 December 1998 | 8 December 2003 | INC |
| Bhupesh Baghel | Cabinet Minister | Transport | 8 December 1998 | 8 December 2003 | INC |
