= Niwali =

- village
- Location in Madhya Pradesh, India
- Coordinates: 21.68°N 74.92°E
- Country: India
- State: Madhya Pradesh
- District: Barwani

Languages
  - Official: Hindi
- Time zone: UTC+5:30 (IST)
- ISO 3166 code: IN-MP

Niwali is a village & Tehsil in Barwani district in the Indian state of Madhya Pradesh.

== Geography ==
Niwali is located in the Narmada Valley, at 21.68°N 74.92°E. It has an average elevation of 508 m (1,667 ft). Situated on MP SH 36, Niwali lies 21 km (13 mi) from Sendhwa. It is a Tehsil of Barwani district.
