= Bhima Nayak =

Indian revolutionary (d. 1876)

- Born: 1840; Barwani district, Madhya Pradesh
- Died: 29 December 1876 (aged 35–36); Port Blair
- Known for: Role in Indian freedom struggle
- Website: https://bhimanayak.com

Bhima Nayak or Bheema Nayak (death 29 December 1876) was an Indian revolutionary. He fought against the British in the Indian Rebellion of 1857. When Bhima was convicted by the British government, he was kept in Port Blair and Nicobar.

== Revolt and death ==
Nayak hails from Barwani district of Madhya Pradesh. As a Bhil tribal leader he took active part in the Indian Rebellion of 1857 against the East India Company. Nayak met Tantia Tope at the time of revolt. He confronted the force of Captain Keating, but successfully escaped. In 1861 he was captured from his hideout and sent to Andaman Islands for corporal punishment. He was hanged in Port Blair on 29 December 1876. Bhima was also known as Nimad's Robin Hood.

== Legacy ==
A government scheme, Shaheed Bhima Nayak Pariyojna in Madhya Pradesh is named after him. CM Shivraj Singh Chauhan dedicated a Bhima Nayak Memorial at village Dhaba Bawdi of Badwani district on 21 January 2017.

== Bhima Naik name background ==
- Revolutionary movement for Indian independence
