= Mangilal Tajsingh =

Indian politician

Member of the Madhya Pradesh Parliament for Rajpur Vidhan Sabha
- Incumbent
- Assumed office 1957

Mangilal Tajsingh was an Indian politician from the state of Madhya Pradesh. He represented Rajpur Vidhan Sabha constituency in Madhya Pradesh Legislative Assembly by winning General election of 1957.
