= Bawangaja =

Jain pilgrim center in India

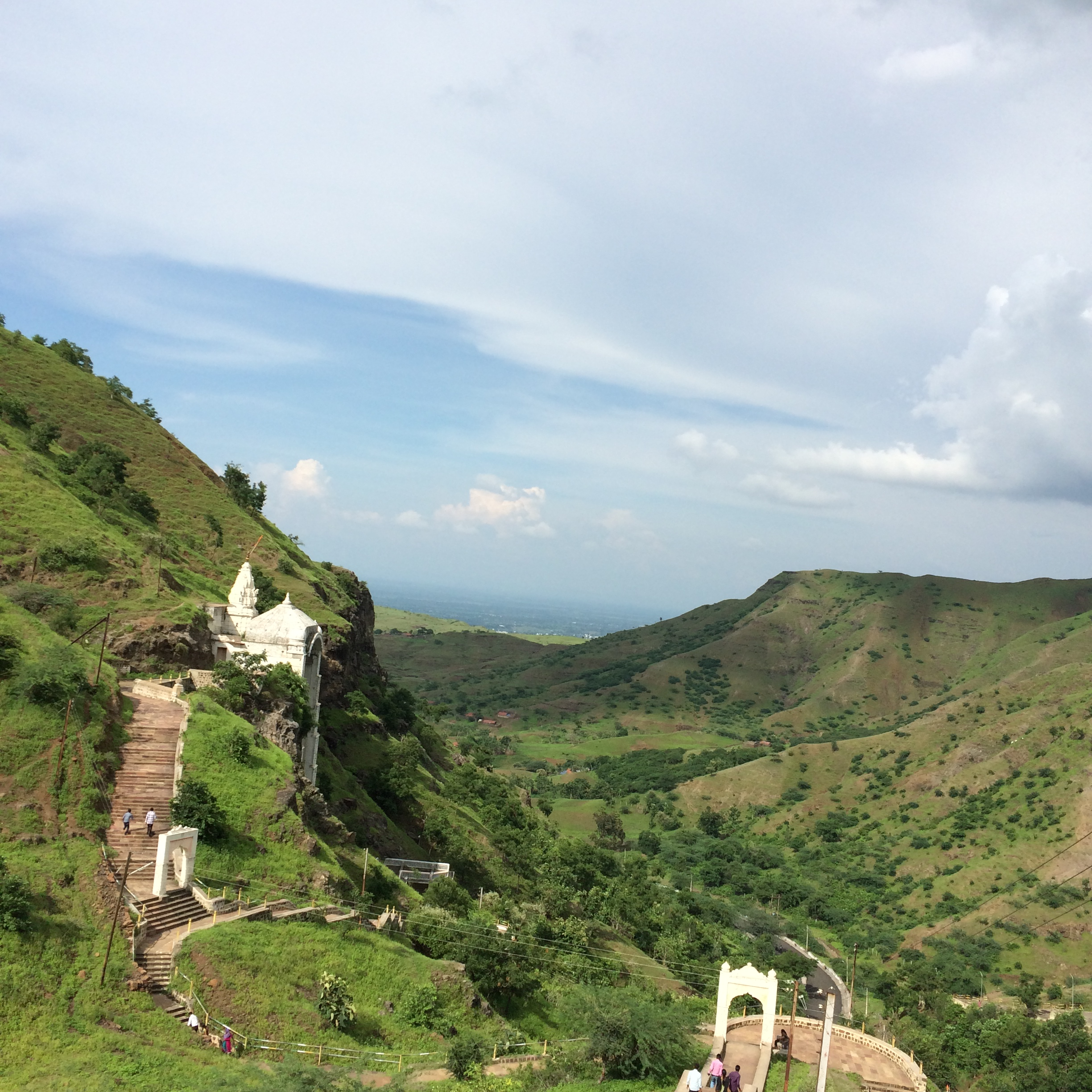
- Hike to Bawangaja Tirtha

- Location within Madhya Pradesh

Religion
- Affiliation: Jainism
- Deity: Rishabhadeva
- Festivals: Mahamastakabhisheka, Mahavir Jayanti

Location
- Location: Barwani, Madhya Pradesh
- Interactive map of Bawangaja
- Coordinates: 21.996°N 74.862°E

Architecture
- Established: 12th century

Specifications
- Temple: 11
- Elevation: 1,219.4 m (4,001 ft)

Website
- www.bawangaja.in

Bawangaja (meaning 52 yards) is a famous Jain pilgrim center in the Barwani district of southwestern Madhya Pradesh in India. Located about 6 kilometers south of River Narmada, its main attraction is the world's second largest monolithic statue (carved out of the mountain) of Lord Rishabhadeva (largest being the Statue of Ahimsa), the first Jain Tirthankara. The statue is 84 feet (26 m) high. The center is located in the Satpura Range and is about 8 km from a Barwani town.

== Village ==
Bawangaja is a small town, situated in the middle of Satpura range, five miles from the town of Barwani, Madhya Pradesh. As per the 2011 Census of India, the Bawangaja village accommodates 94 families having a total population of 494 of which 242 are males while 252 are females.

== Statue ==
The 84 ft (26 m) tall monolithic statue (carved out of a single rock) of Lord Rishabhadeva (the first Tirthankara and founder of Jainism) is situated at a height of 1,219.4 m (4,001 ft), in the middle of the Satpura range. It was created early in the 12th century. The statue is supported from the back unlike the Gommateshwara statue of Lord Bahubali at Shravanabelagola, Karnataka. Along with the statue, the area has a complex of eleven temples.

The idol stands on the base of the mountain just like the Gommateshwara statue of Lord Bahubali at Shravanabelagola. In 2020, the Mahamastakabhisheka statue will be organized with an estimate of 1.5 million devotees. The repairs of the idol were carried out by Bhattaraka as per the inscription dated back to 1503 CE. The idol was again repaired in 1989/90, followed by a consecrating ceremony organized in January 1991.

=== Iconography ===
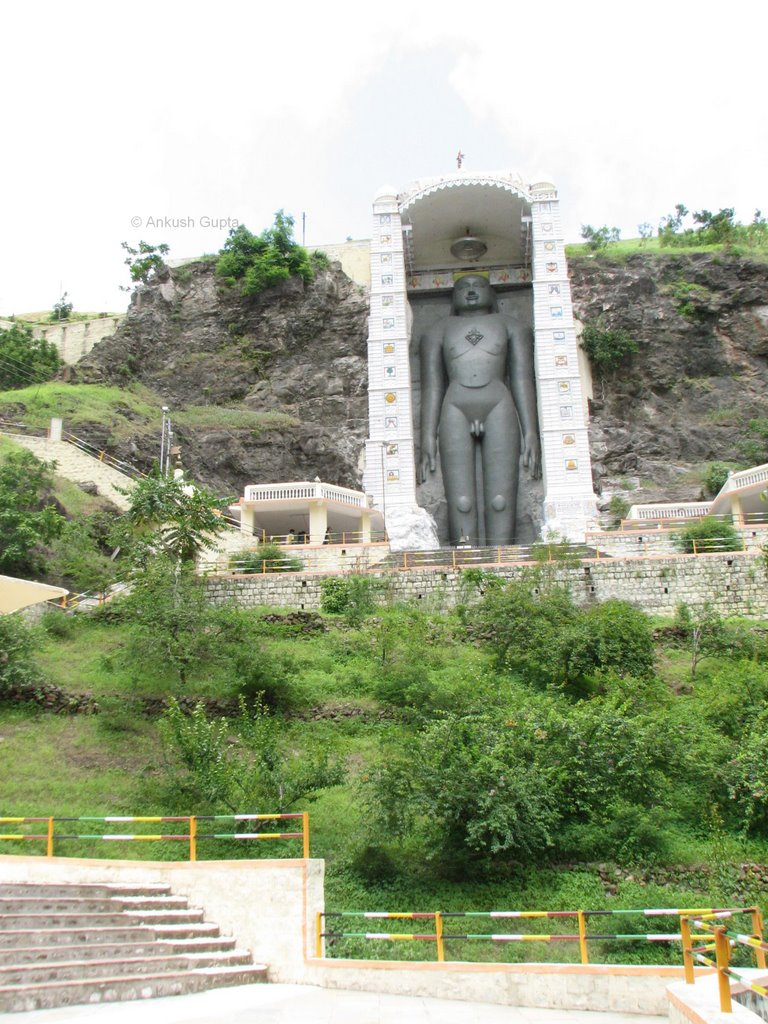
Rishabhadeva Idol

The idol of Lord Rishabhadeva is made in brown stone in Kayotsarga posture. The hands of the idol are not joined with the legs. The structural art & style of this idol is unique and it is in perfect proportion. The various parts of the idol are quite symmetrical. There is a balanced image of all emotions like joy, mercy & separation on the face of this idol. To the left of the huge idol of Bawangaja Lord Rishabhadeva is the 4 armed Gomukha. To the right is the very artistic idol of 16 armed Chakreshvari.

MEASUREMENT OF THE IDOL (Details of the idol)
Total height. 84 feet.
Expansion between two hands 26 feet.
Length of hand. 46'-6 "
Length between waist and heel 47'
Circumference of head. 26'
Length of foot. 13'-09 ”
Length of nose. 03'-03 ”
Length of eye. 03'-03 ”
Length of ear. O9'-08 ”
Distance between the two ear. 17'-06 ”
Width of foot. 05'

== Transport ==
The nearest airport is Devi Ahilya Bai Holkar Airport in Indore.

== Chulgiri ==
Chulgiri Jain temple, a Siddha-Kṣetra, is also situated on the hilltop, contains two inscriptions dated 1166 and 1459 AD. The Indrajit, Kumbhakarna & various other scholars attained emancipation through the self-meditation. The 3 ancient foot images of Indrajit, Kumbhakarna & the other are present in this temple. Except foot images, the two idols of Lord Māllīnātha & Chandraprabha are installed in the main altar. Moreover, the several idols are installed on both sides in the main assembly hall (Mahamandap). Bawangaja Yatra, an annual fair, is organized every year on full Moon day of Hindu calendar month Pausha. In 2016, Bawanga Trust had carried out several development works including restoration of the temple complex and building of a 3-story dharmshala with 108 rooms having all modern amenities.

== See also ==
- Statue of Ahimsa
- Gommateshvara statue
- List of the tallest statues in India
