= Thikri =

- City
- Location in Madhya Pradesh, India Thikri (India)
- Coordinates: 22°4′0″N 75°23′0″E
- Country: India
- State: Madhya Pradesh
- District: Barwani

Government
  - Body: nagar panchayat
- Elevation: 162 m (531 ft)
- Time zone: UTC+5:30 (IST)
- PIN: 451660
- Telephone code: 07284
- ISO 3166 code: IN-MP
- Vehicle registration: MP
- Coastline: 0 kilometres (0 mi)
- Nearest city: Indore
- Lok Sabha constituency: Khargone Barwani

Thikri is a town and a tehsil in Barwani District, Madhya Pradesh, India.

== Geography ==
It is located at 22°4′0″N 75°23′0″E at an elevation of 162 m above MSL. Thikri is a small city located around 16 km north-east of Julwania. Surrounded by Khargone, Barwani and Barwaha, the town is a part of Barwani District and the Indore region. It is also near the river Narmada.

== Climate ==
Climate data for Thikri (1981–2010, extremes 1951–1998)
Month	Jan	Feb	Mar	Apr	May	Jun	Jul	Aug	Sep	Oct	Nov	Dec	Year
Record high °C (°F)	35.5 (95.9)	40.0 (104.0)	44.0 (111.2)	47.5 (117.5)	47.5 (117.5)	47.1 (116.8)	41.9 (107.4)	36.8 (98.2)	39.5 (103.1)	42.2 (108.0)	38.5 (101.3)	36.4 (97.5)	47.5 (117.5)
Mean daily maximum °C (°F)	29.7 (85.5)	32.2 (90.0)	37.2 (99.0)	40.8 (105.4)	42.8 (109.0)	39.2 (102.6)	33.3 (91.9)	30.8 (87.4)	33.4 (92.1)	34.8 (94.6)	32.6 (90.7)	30.1 (86.2)	34.7 (94.5)
Mean daily minimum °C (°F)	10.6 (51.1)	11.6 (52.9)	16.9 (62.4)	21.3 (70.3)	25.5 (77.9)	25.3 (77.5)	23.5 (74.3)	21.9 (71.4)	20.4 (68.7)	16.9 (62.4)	13.4 (56.1)	10.3 (50.5)	18.1 (64.6)
Record low °C (°F)	3.0 (37.4)	4.8 (40.6)	7.5 (45.5)	10.1 (50.2)	18.3 (64.9)	20.1 (68.2)	19.5 (67.1)	17.2 (63.0)	14.8 (58.6)	6.1 (43.0)	6.1 (43.0)	1.0 (33.8)	1.0 (33.8)
Average rainfall mm (inches)	5.6 (0.22)	0.6 (0.02)	3.6 (0.14)	1.4 (0.06)	8.4 (0.33)	109.0 (4.29)	209.9 (8.26)	237.0 (9.33)	112.3 (4.42)	48.2 (1.90)	10.0 (0.39)	5.5 (0.22)	751.4 (29.58)
Average rainy days	0.4	0.1	0.4	0.2	0.6	5.4	10.9	11.5	5.8	2.2	0.8	0.5	39.1
Average relative humidity (%) (at 08:30 IST)	64	55	46	46	52	68	82	87	82	70	60	60	65
Source: India Meteorological Department
