= Balkunwa =

Village in Madhya Pradesh, India

Coordinates: 21.9632°N 74.96868°E

- Location within India
- Country: India
- State: Madhya Pradesh
- District: Barwani

Languages
- Time zone: UTC+5:30 (IST)

Balkunwa is a village in Barwani District of Madhya Pradesh state of India. As of the 2011 Census of India, it had a population of 4,119.
