= Bahía Creek =

- Municipality and village
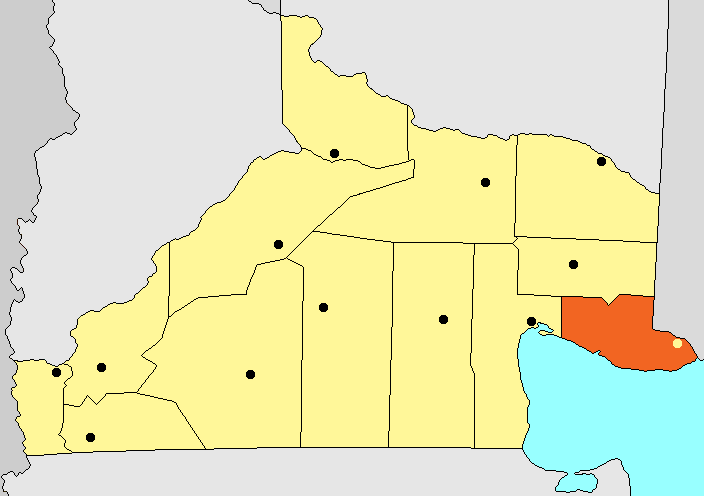
- Country: Argentina
- Province: Río Negro Province
- Department: Adolfo Alsina
- Time zone: UTC−3 (ART)
- Postal code: R8501
- Area code: 02920
- Climate: BSk

Bahía Creek is a beach resort village at 41.0836° S, 63.9317° W, and municipality in the Adolfo Alsina Department of the Río Negro Province in Argentina.

== Location ==
Bahía Creek is located on the northern coast of the San Matías Gulf. It's a long and wide sea beach facing south to the Argentine Sea and along the RP1. It is located 135 km from Viedma and 100 km from Balneario El Cóndor, accessed by the Provincial Route 1 (RP 1) that borders the Argentine Sea, and RP 51. By RP 1 from Viedma, there are 60 km of asphalt until La Loberia and then 75 km of gravel road.

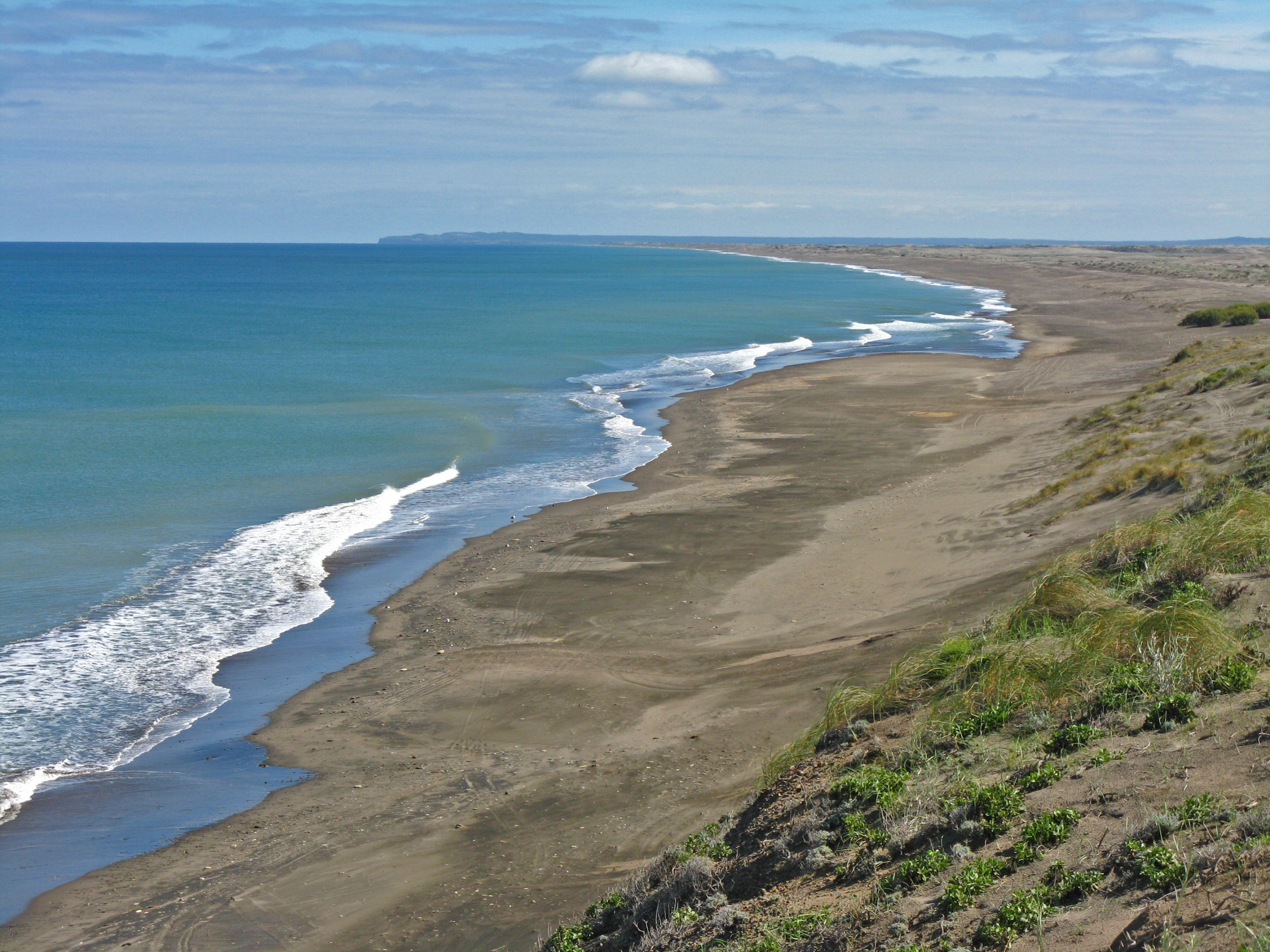
Bahia Creek coasts

== Geography ==
Bahía Creek is an area of low cliffs, with dunes and wide sandy beaches. It is a place for summer and weekend homes. There is also a Fishermen's Club and a Hostel on the beach with domes.

== Nature ==
The southern right whales are the biggest feature in the area. Swim-with-whales tours are available in San Matías Gulf, being the only location in the world that swimming with this species is legally permitted. Dolphins can also be seen from shores.

== Gallery ==
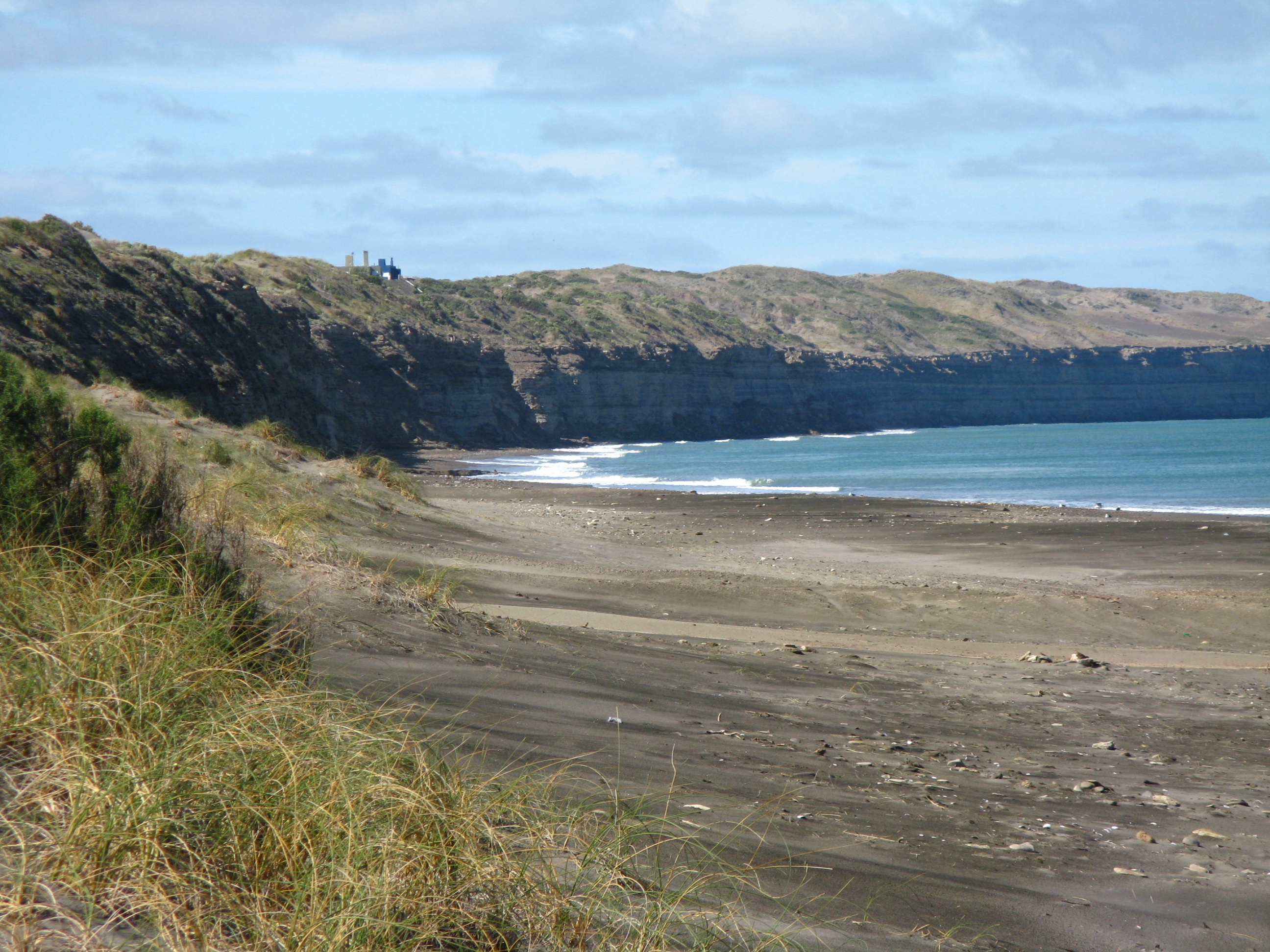
Bahia Creek

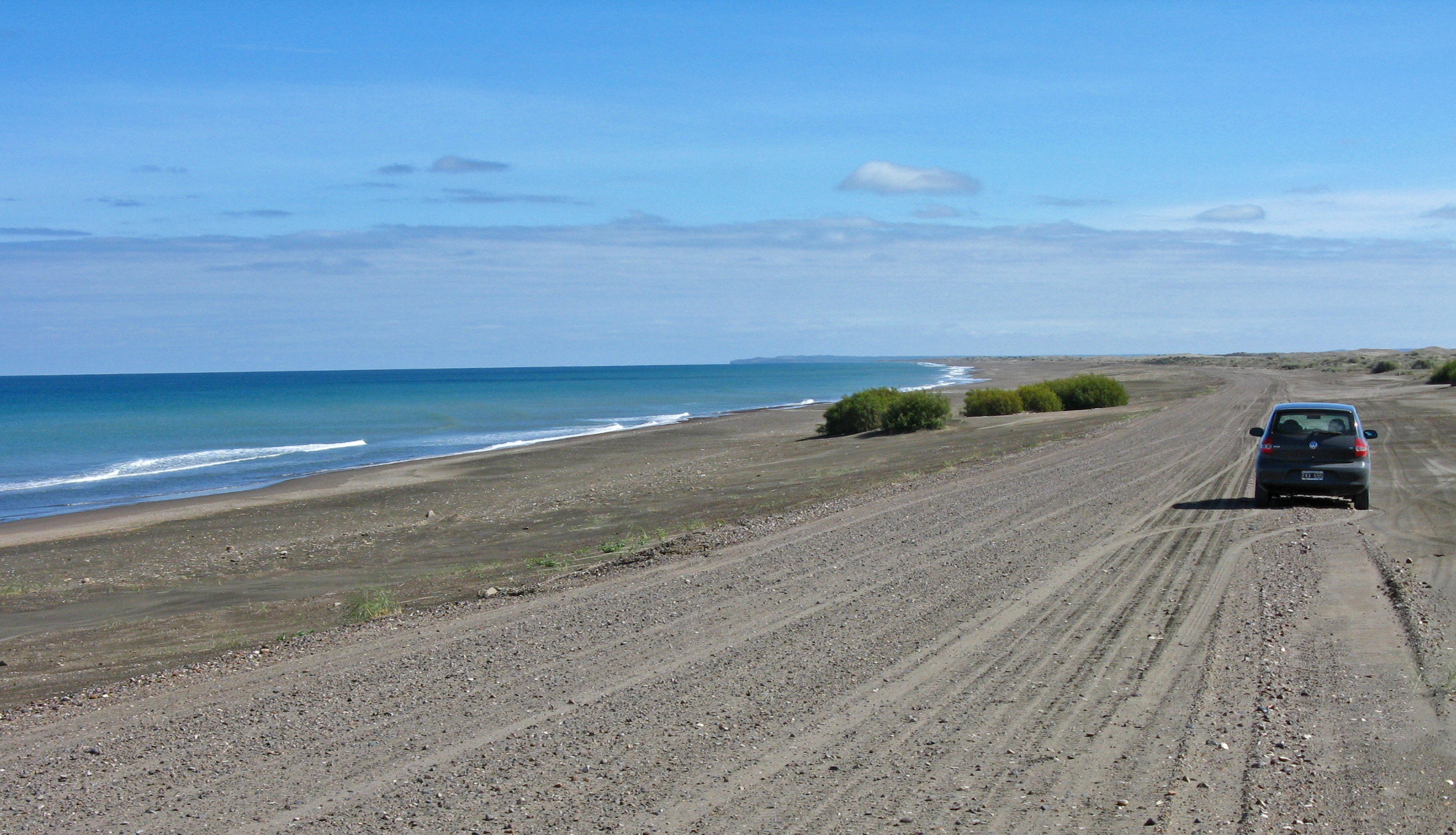
Creek Bay - Rio Negro's Coast Road - 2010 - Argentina - (Bahia Creek - Camino de la Costa - Argentina)

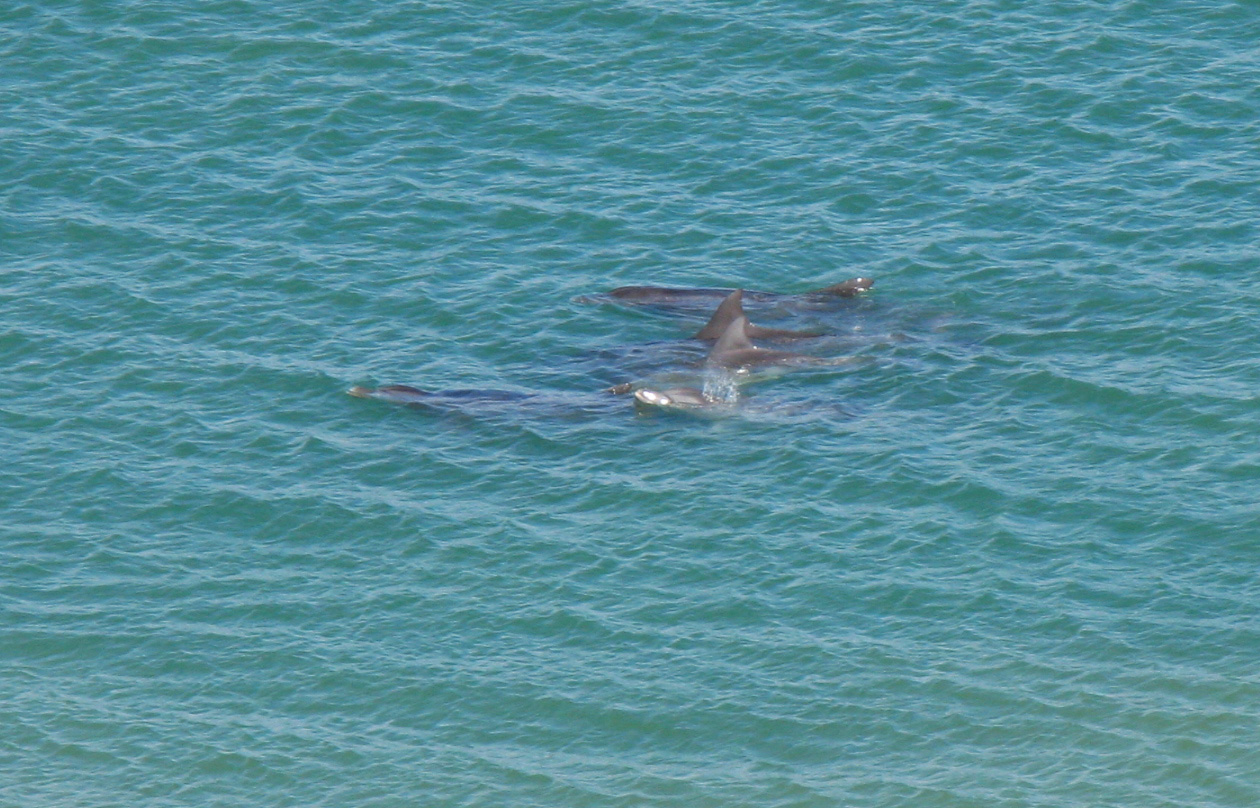
Bottlenose dolphins in Creek Bay - 2010
