= Pansemal =

- Town
- Location in Madhya Pradesh, India Pansemal (India)
- Coordinates: 21.66°N 74.7°E
- India: India
- State: Madhya Pradesh
- District: Barwani
- Elevation: 242 m (794 ft)

Population (2001)
  - Total: 27,280

Languages
  - Official: Hindi
- Time zone: UTC+5:30 (IST)
- 451770: 451770
- ISO 3166 code: IN-MP
- Vehicle registration: MP

Pansemal is a town and a nagar panchayat in Barwani district in the Indian state of Madhya Pradesh.

== Geography ==
Pansemal is located at 21.65°N 74.7°E. It has an average elevation of 242 metres (793 feet).

== Demographics ==
As of 2001 India census, Pansemal had a population of 10,745. Males constitute 52% of the population and females 48%. Pansemal has an average literacy rate of 59%, lower than the national average of 59.5%: male literacy is 68%, and female literacy is 49%. In Pansemal, 17% of the population is under 6 years of age.

== Notable people ==
- Bala Bachchan (Former Home Minister)
