= Ozara, Abia State =

Ozara
- Autonomous community
- Location in Nigeria
- Coordinates: 5°47′37.4″N 7°31′25.5″E
- Country: Nigeria
- State: Abia State
- Local government area: Isuikwuato
- Time zone: West Africa Time

Ozara is an autonomous community in Isuikwuato Local Government Area of Abia State, Nigeria. The mainly agricultural community of Ozara is a compacted settlement. Ozara is led by a Tribal king, Eze Lazarus Mmaduagwu. The community school, Ozara Central School, formerly a Catholic mission school, is currently managed by the government. Ozara has a railway station called Ozara Station, in a site which is an hour's walk from the center of the community through Uzo-Ugboala.

Ozara formerly observed an "eight-market-day" trade which takes place every "Eke" market day. Recently, it has been reduced to every four days, which means it now observes both Ozara and the nearby Amiyi community's market days. Ozara sells primarily garri, varieties of yam, palm oil, and other farm produce.
