= Ozar, Iran =

Ozar ازار
- Village
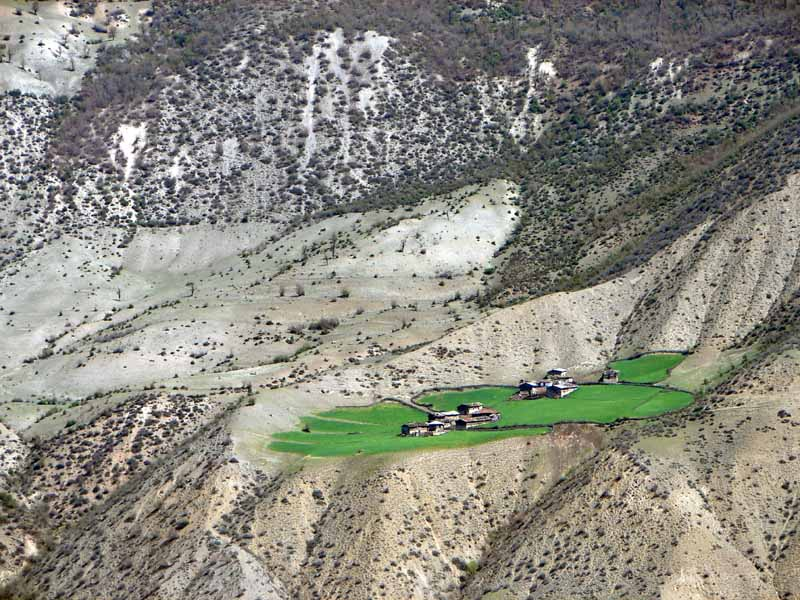

- Location within Iran
- Coordinates: 36°32′04″N 51°18′20″E
- Country: Iran
- Province: Mazandaran
- County: Chalus
- Bakhsh: Marzanabad
- Rural District: Birun Bashm

Population (2016)
  - Total: 22
- Time zone: UTC+3:30 (IRST)

Ozar (Persian: ازار, also Romanized as Ozār) is a village in Birun Bashm Rural District, Marzanabad District, Chalus County, Mazandaran Province, Iran. At the 2016 census, its population was 22, in 6 families.
