= Krishna Kumar Gupta =

Indian politician

Krishna Kumar Gupta is an Indian politician who is a former representative of Raigarh constituency in the Madhya Pradesh Legislative Assembly. He is the son of Bhagirathi Lal Gupta of Raigarh, Chhattisgarh. He is the ex-minister of Chhattisgarh. He was a minister for 23 years at that time and he was:-

- Mine Minister
- Health Minister
- Education Minister
- MLA of Raigarh
