= Balneario El Cóndor =

Coordinates: 41°03′S 62°50′W

Balneario El Cóndor El Cóndor
- Municipality and village
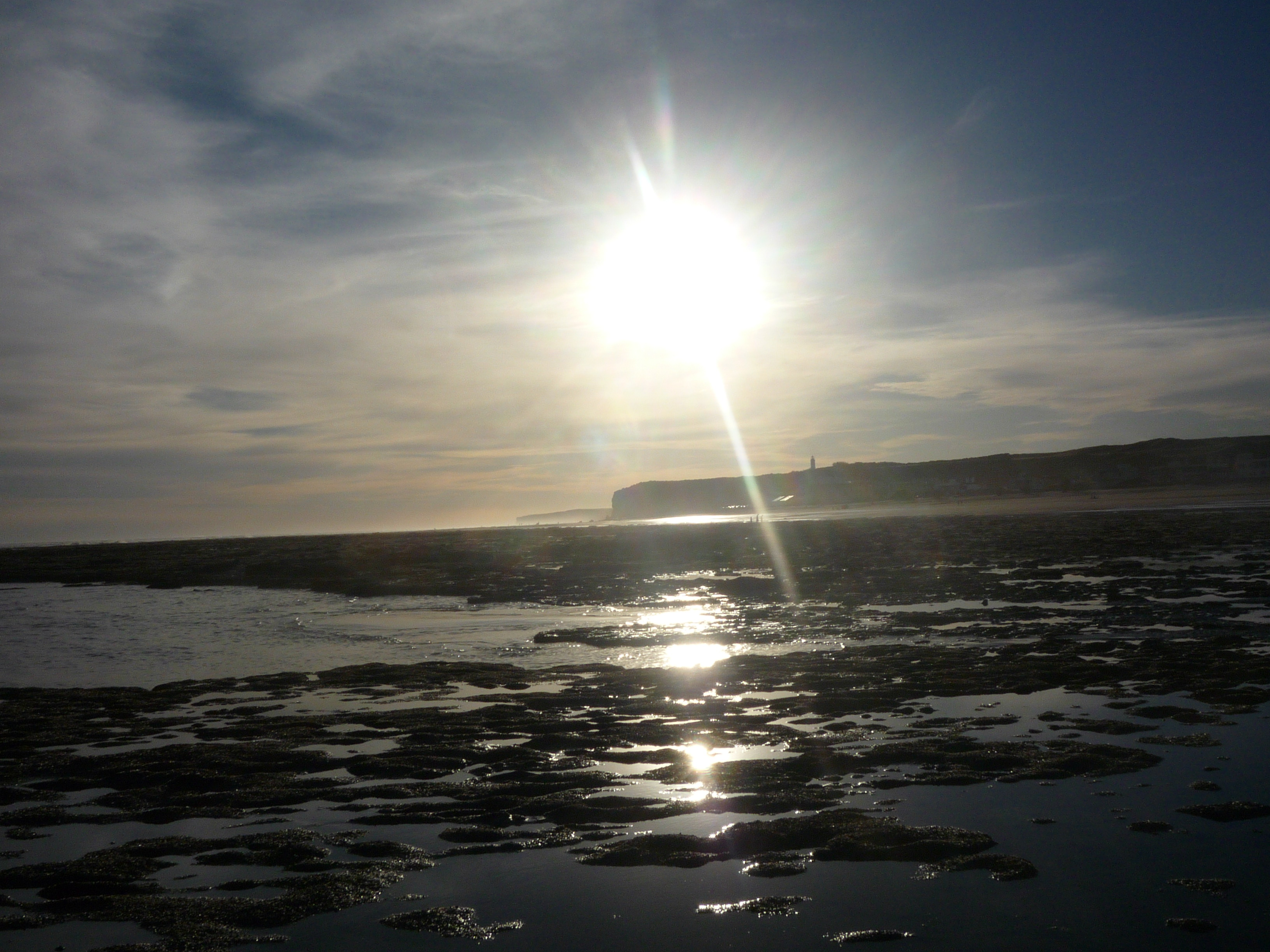
- Interactive map of Balneario El Cóndor
- Country: Argentina
- Province: Río Negro Province

Population (2001)
  - Total: 428
- Time zone: UTC−3 (ART)
- Postal code: R8500
- Area code: 02920

Balneario El Cóndor is a village and municipality in Río Negro Province in Argentina. It is located on the coast of the Río Negro Province, Argentina, on the south bank of the mouth of the Negro River in the Argentine Sea. El Cóndor is located on km 31 of Provincial Route 1 in Río Negro, on the route that begins in the provincial capital, Viedma.

El Balneario is the first in a succession of beaches over 150 km in length. Following Provincial Route 1, it is located on the Camino de la Costa, so called because it goes through the various Rio Negro coastal beaches bordering the sea.

Politically, El Cóndor belongs to the Adolfo Alsina Department of Río Negro Province of Argentina.

== History ==
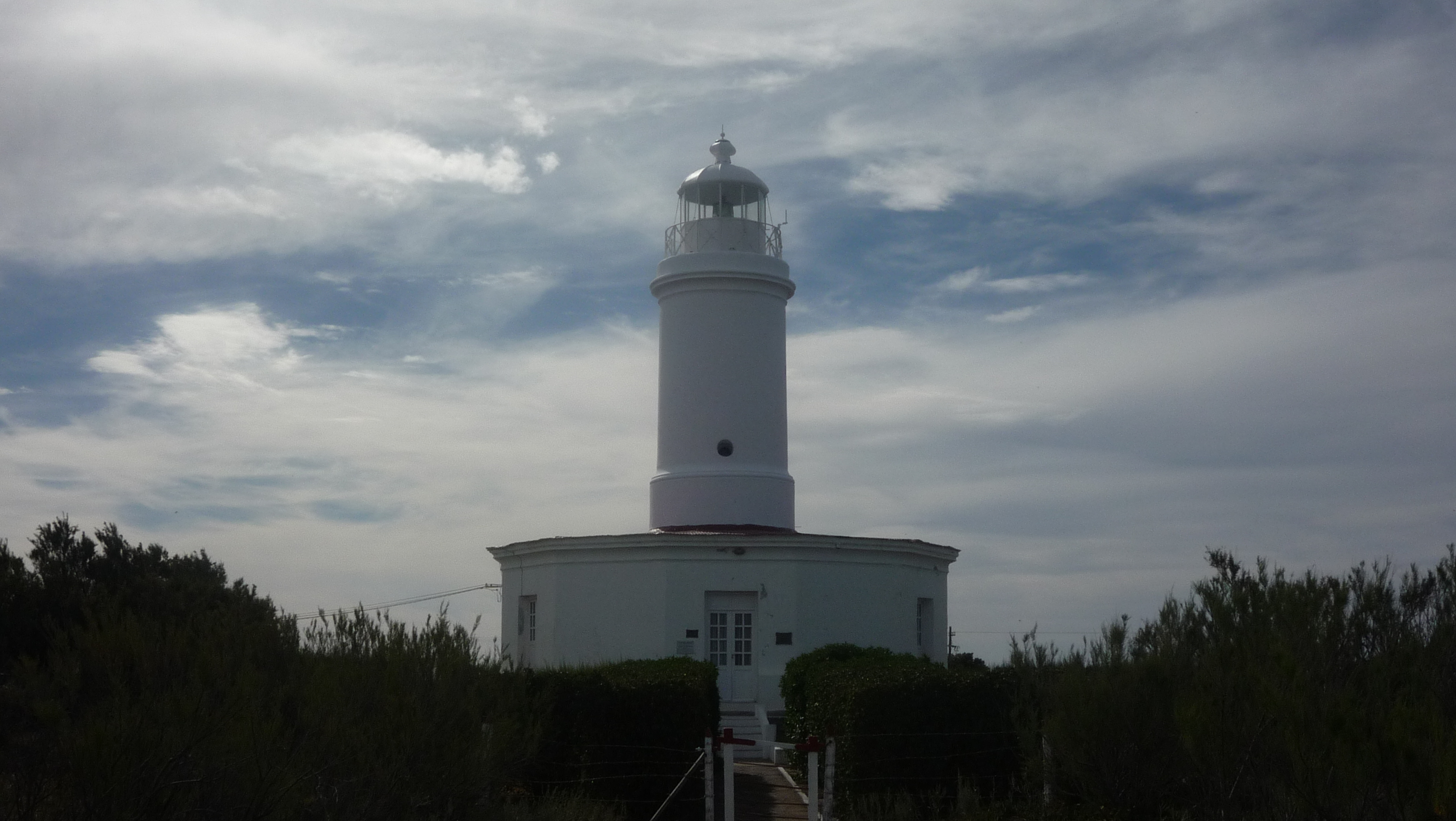
Balneario Lighthouse.

El Balneario is named after a ship of Danish origin of that name, which capsized on its shores in December 1881. Its occupants were housed in the only boarding place that was near the site and whose inhabitants were also Danes. One of the crew of the ship (the carpenter on board), named Peter Hansen Kruuse, married one of the daughters of the Dane that administered the boarding place and remained for good in Patagonia, had 13 children, and one of them was the famous car racer Arturo Kruuse. Another son, Emilio Kruuse, was the first teacher received in Patagonia; he was the director of the prestigious Viedma Normal School and of the Bahia Blanca Normal School.

== Tourism ==
Upon arrival at km 31 of Provincial Route 1 and entering the small village by the access road which ends at the Playa Grande, to the left of its long coast is the mouth of the Negro River in the Argentine Sea, and to the right, where the cliffs begin, is the oldest lighthouse in Patagonia, serving since 1887.

Throughout the entire length, from the river mouth to the lighthouse, varied water, air and land sports are possible. The beach is of fine sand and the sea color is earthy, due to sediments from the Negro River. Like any Patagonian beach it is windy, but this is very well compensated by the good temperature of its waters.

At the mouth, in an area protected by dunes, lies the hamlet El Pescadero, reached by a street of the same name. Here all types of shore and board fishing are practiced, in addition to windsurfing, canoeing, four tracks and others.

== Climate ==
Climate data for El Cóndor, Río Negro (1997–2011)
Month	Jan	Feb	Mar	Apr	May	Jun	Jul	Aug	Sep	Oct	Nov	Dec	Year
Record high °C (°F)	37.0 (98.6)	38.0 (100.4)	37.5 (99.5)	29.2 (84.6)	28.8 (83.8)	19.8 (67.6)	22.7 (72.9)	23.6 (74.5)	24.7 (76.5)	30.0 (86.0)	33.3 (91.9)	37.3 (99.1)	38.0 (100.4)
Mean daily maximum °C (°F)	25.1 (77.2)	25.2 (77.4)	22.3 (72.1)	19.5 (67.1)	15.2 (59.4)	12.4 (54.3)	12.0 (53.6)	13.4 (56.1)	15.4 (59.7)	18.4 (65.1)	20.8 (69.4)	23.7 (74.7)	18.6 (65.5)
Daily mean °C (°F)	19.9 (67.8)	19.8 (67.6)	17.1 (62.8)	13.9 (57.0)	10.5 (50.9)	7.5 (45.5)	7.0 (44.6)	7.8 (46.0)	10.2 (50.4)	13.1 (55.6)	15.5 (59.9)	18.5 (65.3)	13.4 (56.1)
Mean daily minimum °C (°F)	14.7 (58.5)	14.4 (57.9)	11.6 (52.9)	7.6 (45.7)	5.2 (41.4)	2.5 (36.5)	1.9 (35.4)	2.2 (36.0)	5.2 (41.4)	7.7 (45.9)	9.9 (49.8)	13.1 (55.6)	8.0 (46.4)
Record low °C (°F)	9.2 (48.6)	5.2 (41.4)	3.4 (38.1)	−3.6 (25.5)	−3.5 (25.7)	−3.9 (25.0)	−5.7 (21.7)	−6.8 (19.8)	−4.4 (24.1)	−1.6 (29.1)	3.7 (38.7)	3.0 (37.4)	−6.8 (19.8)
Average precipitation mm (inches)	28.7 (1.13)	28.6 (1.13)	41.7 (1.64)	32.9 (1.30)	22.6 (0.89)	20.4 (0.80)	33.5 (1.32)	14.6 (0.57)	22.1 (0.87)	23.0 (0.91)	20.9 (0.82)	21.3 (0.84)	310.3 (12.22)
Source: Departamento Provincial de Aguas

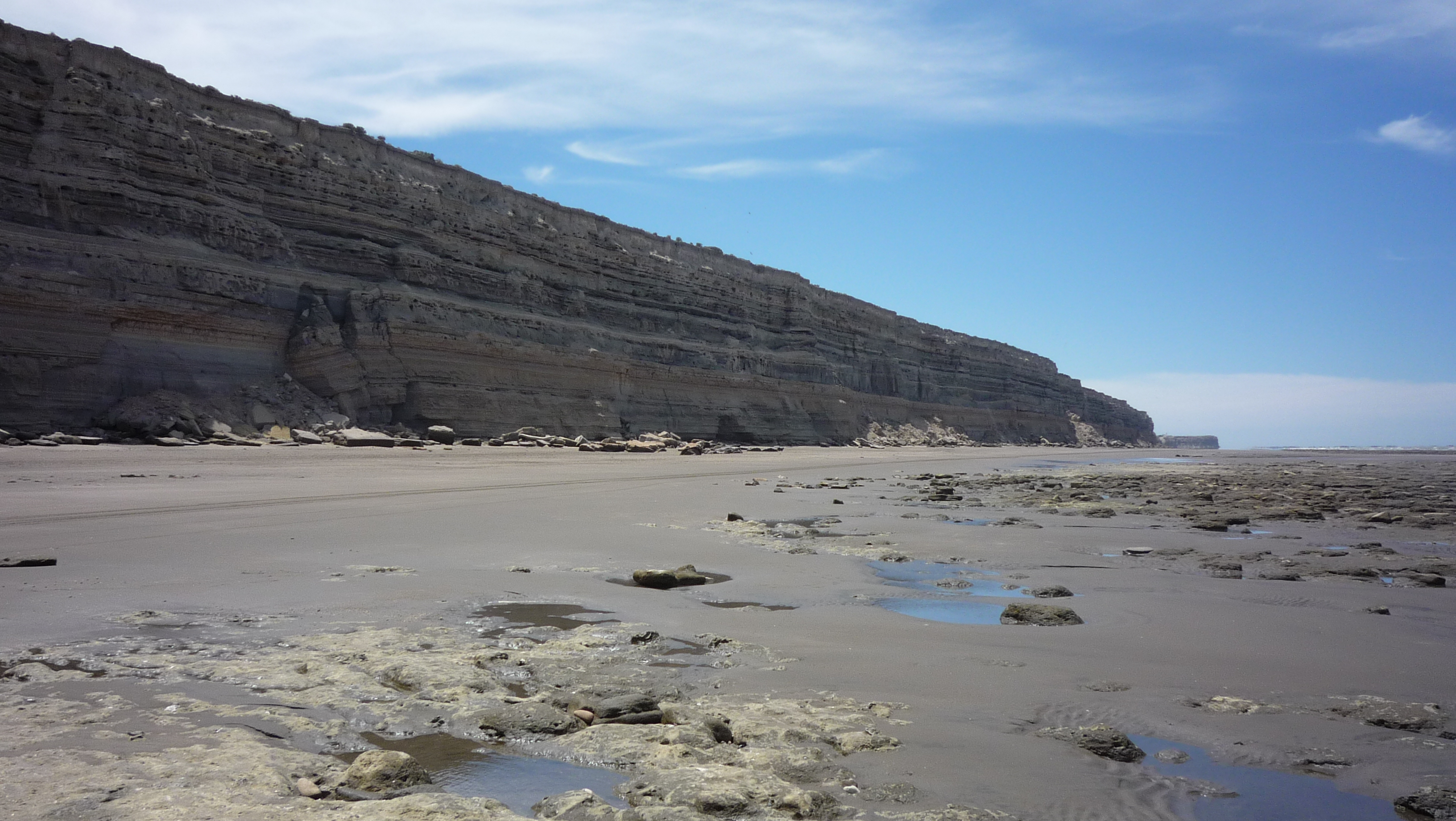
Cliff area, home to the world's largest colony of parrots
