= Mumbai–Nashik Expressway =

Road in India

Mumbai-Nashik Expressway
- मुंबई-नाशिक द्रुतगती मार्ग
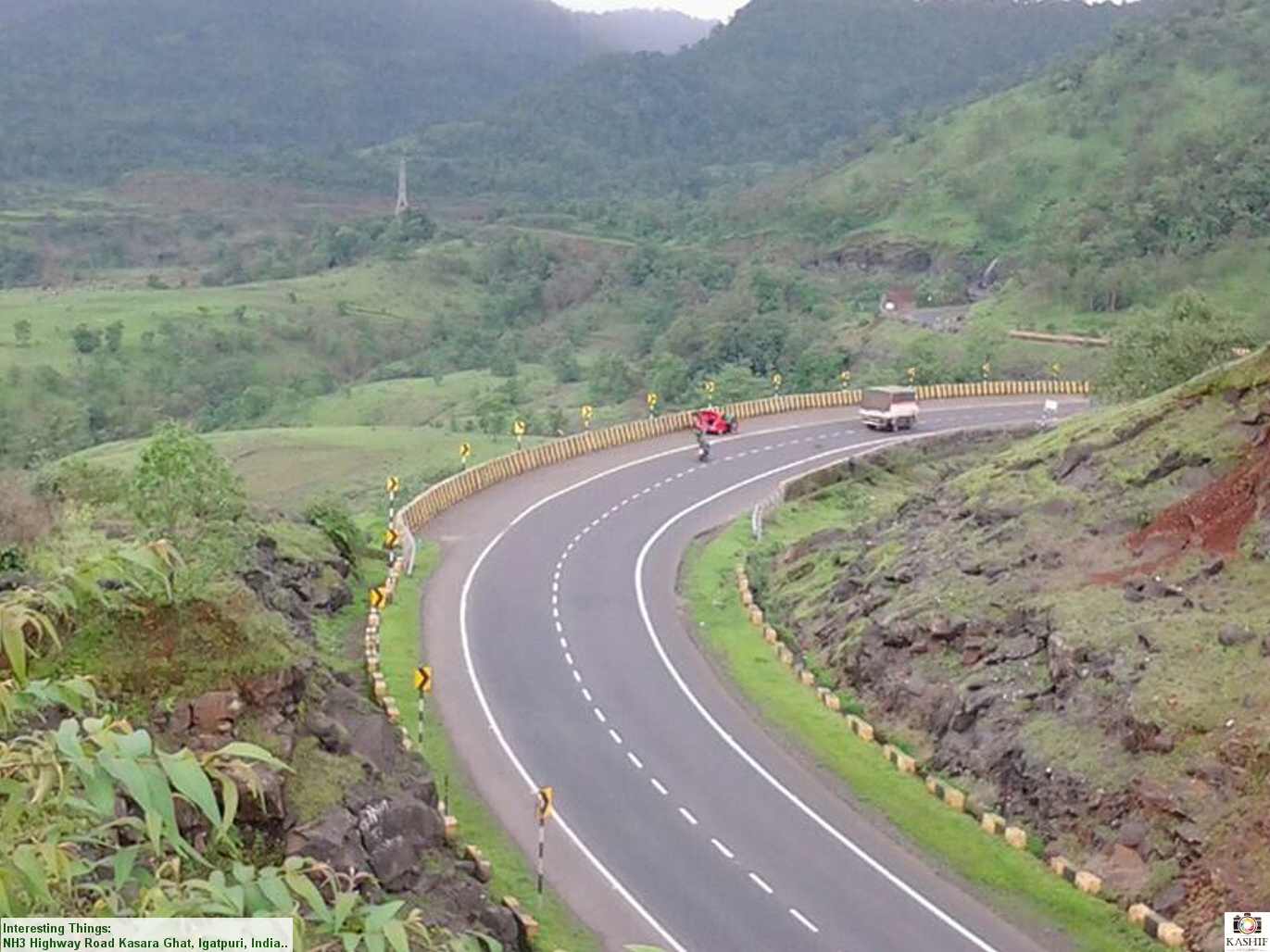
- Segment at Kasara Ghat

Route information
- Maintained by NHAI
- Length: 150 km (93 mi)

Major junctions
- South end: Thane
- North end: Nashik

Location
- Country: India
- States: Maharashtra

Highway system
- Roads in India; Expressways; National; State; Asian

Mumbai Nashik Expressway (mr:मुंबई नाशिक द्रुतगती मार्ग) is a 150 km (93 mi) long highway connecting Mumbai to Nashik. The total cost of the project is ₹40 billion (US$420 million). At the time when this project was awarded, it was the largest BOT road project in India. The project involves increasing the number of lanes on the 99.5 km Vadape-Gonde (Mumbai-Nasik) section of the National Highway-3 to four.

== Project development ==
Projects under implementation in NHDP Phase III A

Vadpe to Gonde

Vadpe is in Thane district and Gonde in Nashik district. 100 km work has been completed. This contract was given in June 2005 to Gammon India + Sadbhav Engineering Limited + Billimoria consortium of contractors. The name of SPV is "Mumbai Nashik Expressway limited" The project cost was ₹5.79 billion. The expected completion date was 36 months from date of award of contract. The completion date was first extended up to April 2009. Now the completion date has been extended up to January 2011. The project supervision consultant to this project are Sheladia Associates INC- Artefact Projects Ltd – USA

As of 15 Jan 2018, this project has been completed up to 99%.

== See also ==
- National Highway 160

== Gallery ==
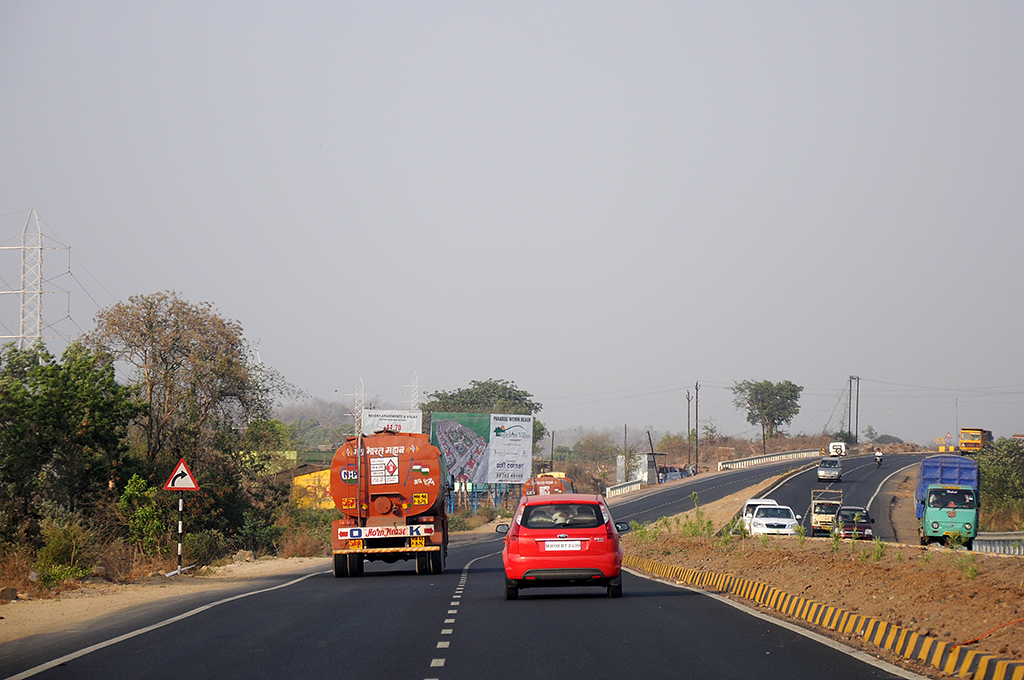
Mumbai Nashik Expressway

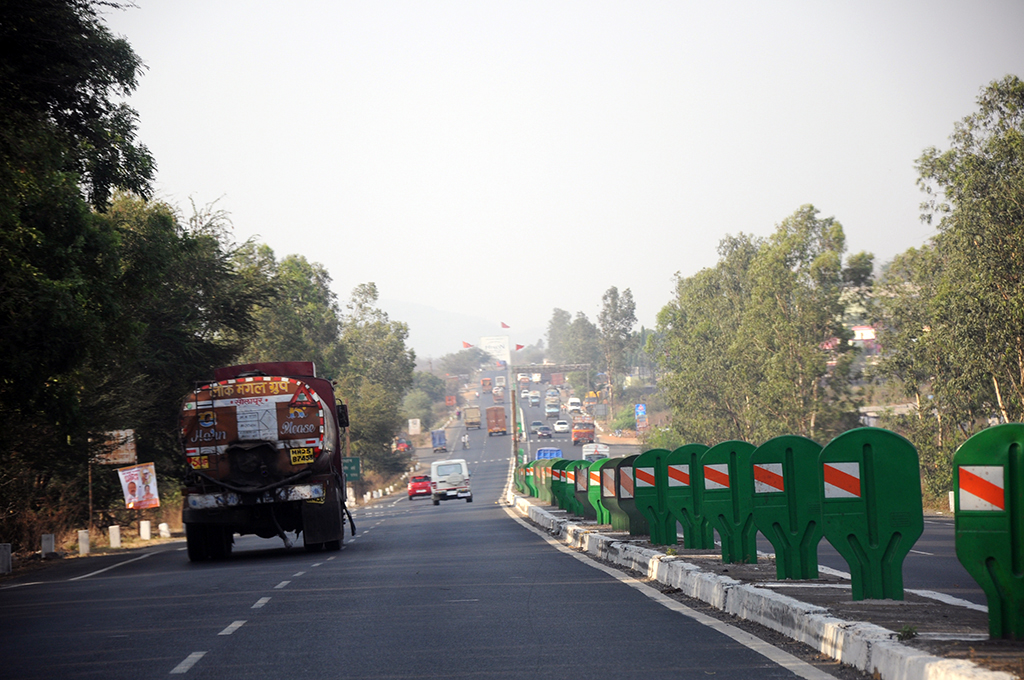
Mumbai Nashik Expressway
