= National Highway 3 (India, old numbering) =

Old numbering of road in India

National Highway 3
- Interactive Map of Old National Highway 3 in red
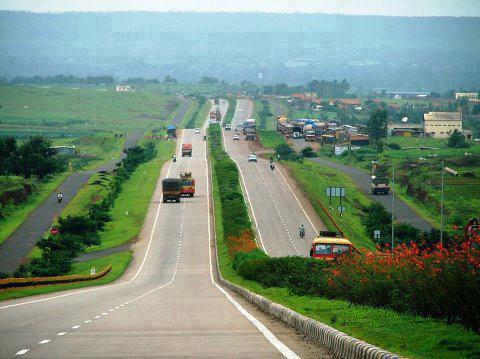
- Old NH 3 Nashik - Mumbai, Maharashtra

Route information
- Part of AH43 AH47

Major junctions
- North end: Agra, Uttar Pradesh
- List: NH 2 in Agra; NH 11 in Agra; NH 93 in Agra; NH 11B in Dholpur; NH 75 in Gwalior; NH 92 in Gwalior; NH 25 in Shivpuri; NH 76 in Shivpuri; NH 12 in Biaora; NH 86 in Dewas; NH 59 in Indore; NH 59A in Indore; NH 6 in Dhule; NH 211 in Dhule; NH 50 in Nashik; NH 222 in Kalyan; NH 4 near Thane; NH 8 in Mumbai
- South end: Mumbai, Maharashtra

Location
- Country: India
- States: Uttar Pradesh: 26 km Rajasthan: 32 km Madhya Pradesh: 712 km Maharashtra: 391 km
- Primary destinations: Agra–Gwalior–Indore–Dhule–Nashik–Mumbai

Highway system
- Roads in India; Expressways; National; State; Asian
| ← NH 2A | → NH 4 |

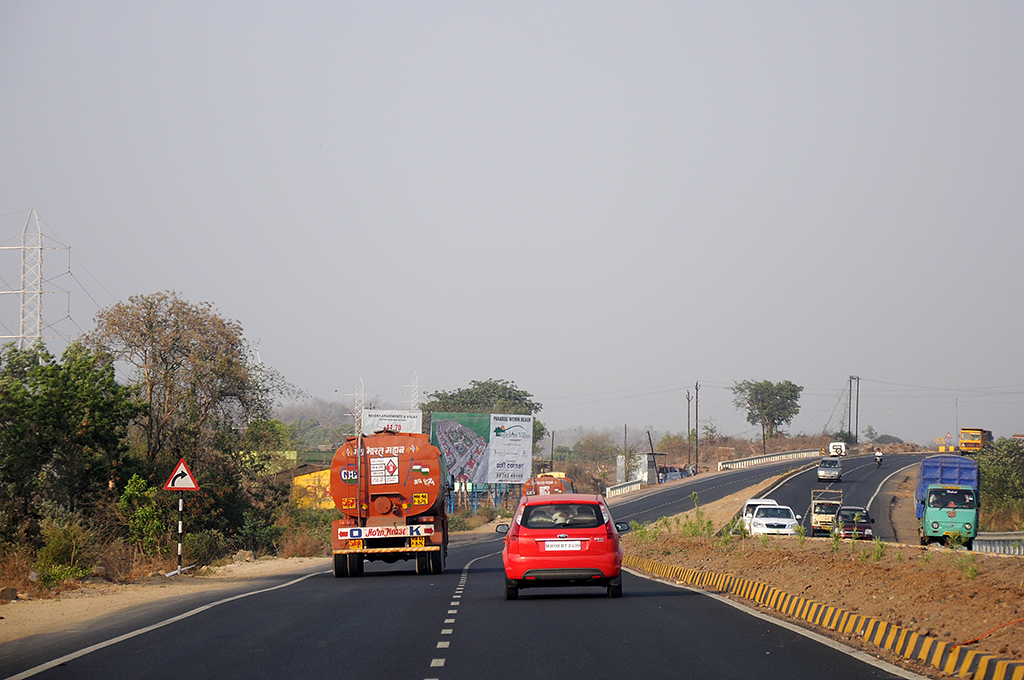
Agra-Mumbai Highway near Dhule, Maharashtra

National Highway 3 (old number), or Old national NH 3, commonly referred to as the Agra–Mumbai Road or just Agra Road in Mumbai, was a major Indian National Highway that ran through the states of Uttar Pradesh, Rajasthan, Madhya Pradesh and Maharashtra in India. The national highway still exists but its various segments have been assigned new numbers as stated in the following section.

National Highway 3A was a branch highway between Bharatpur and terminated at Dholpur, Rajasthan.

== Route ==
The highway originated in Agra in Uttar Pradesh, generally travelled southwest through Dholpur in Rajasthan, Morena, Gwalior, Shivpuri, Guna, Biaora, Maksi, Dewas, Indore, Julwania & Sendhwa in Madhya Pradesh, and Shirpur, Nardana, Dhule, Malegaon, Nashik, Thane and terminated at Mumbai. The length of the old NH-3 was 1,260.25 kilometres (783.08 mi).

The stretch between Agra and Gwalior was marked as the North–South corridor/NH-44 by the National Highways Authority of India. The stretch between Gwalior & Biaora is marked as NH-46 & the stretch between Biaora & Dhule is now marked as NH-52 by the National Highways Authority of India. The stretch from Mumbai to Nashik is now Mumbai Nashik Expressway. After it entered Bombay, the highway was known as Eastern Express Highway. Currently, the stretch between Agra and Gwalior is four-lane. The stretch from Gwalior via Shivpuri, Guna, Maksi up to Dewas road is now four-lane. The condition between Shivpuri and Maksi is newly constructed and good. Now the Condition of the road from Dewas to Indore is six lanes and it continues till Rau (Indore). The road from Rau (Indore) to Mumbai has four lanes but the highway passed through congested Nasik city. Now an elevated expressway of 25.27 kilometres (15.70 mi) has been built to solve the problem of congestion. Stretch from Nashik to Mumbai is 4-lane Mumbai Nashik Expressway. The stretch from Pimpalgaon Bsawant - Nashik - Gondhe is 6 Lane expressway. The stretch from Padgha to Thane 8 lane is in progress.

== New NH numbers of Agra-Mumbai road ==
After renumbering of all national highways by National Highway Authority of India in 2010, the former NH 3 has been broken into several new national highway numbers and the old NH 3 number has ceased to exist.

- Agra - Gwalior is NH 44.
- Gwalior - Biaora is NH 46.
- Biaora - Dhule is NH 52.
- Dhule - Nashik is NH 60.
- Nashik - Mumbra is NH 160.
- Mumbra (Reti Bunder) - Thane / Navi Mumbai is NH 48.

== See also ==
- List of national highways in India
- National Highways Development Project
