= Bala Bachchan =

Indian politician (born 1964)

Minister of Home Affairs Government of Madhya Pradesh
- In office 26 December 2018 – 20 March 2020
- Preceded by: Bhupendra Singh
- Succeeded by: Narottam Mishra

Member of the Madhya Pradesh Legislative Assembly
- Incumbent
- Assumed office 2013
- Preceded by: Devi Singh Patel
- Constituency: Rajpur
- In office 1993–2003
- Succeeded by: Diwan Singh Patel
- Constituency: Rajpur
- In office 2008–2013
- Succeeded by: Diwan Singh Patel
- Constituency: Pansemal

President, Throwball Federation of India
- Incumbent
- Assumed office 2003

Minister of Health Affairs Government of Madhya Pradesh
- In office 26 March 2002 – 20 December 2003

Personal details
- Born: 13 July 1964 (age 61) Rajpur, Madhya Pradesh, India
- Party: Indian National Congress
- Spouse: Pravina Bachchan
- Children: 2
- Education: B.E.
- Alma mater: SGSITS (Indore)
- Occupation: Politician

Bala Bachchan (born 13 July 1964) is a member of INC and member of the Madhya Pradesh Legislative Assembly. He was the Home Minister of Madhya Pradesh in the Kamal Nath ministry.

== Positions held ==
#	From	To	Position
01	1993	1998	Elected to MLA From Rajpur
02	1998	2003	Re-elected to MLA from Rajpur (2nd term)
03	1998	2000	Minister of State, Tribal affairs Department
04	2000	2002	Ministers of State (Independent Charge), Youth & Sport affairs
05	2002	2003	Cabinet Minister, Health and Family Welfare
06	2007	2013	General Secretary, Madhya Pradesh Congress Committee
07	2008	2013	Elected to MLA From Pansemal (3rd term)
08	2012	2018	Secretary, All India Congress Committee
09	2013	2018	Elected to MLA From Rajpur (4th term)
10	2013	2018	Deputy Leader of Congress Legislative Party
11	2014	2018	Co-Incharge, Maharashtra Pradesh Congress committee
12	2016	2017	Leader of Opposition (Acting), Madhya pradesh Legislative assembly
13	2018	Incumbent	Working President, Madhya Pradesh Congress Committee
14	2018	2020	Cabinet Minister, Home & Jail Affairs, Skill Development And Technical Education Department

- Home Minister, Jail Minister, Skill Development, Technical Education, Attached to CM (2018-2020)
- Legislator (six times) - Rajpur & Pansemal
- Minister of Health, M.P. Govt. (1998-2003)
- Secretary of AICC (2012-2018)
- Deputy leader of opposition, Madhya Pradesh Assembly (2013-2018)
- Leader of opposition (acting) M.P. legislative assembly (2015-2017)
- M.P. Congress President (working) (2018-Incumbent)
- Chetan Agrawal (MLA Representative)

Bachchan, former minister in the Digvijay Singh-led Congress government has been conferred with the Home and Jail Ministry.

== Madhya Pradesh Legislative Assembly ==
SI No.	Year	Legislative Assembly	Constituency	Party		Post
1.	1993	10th	Rajpur		Indian National Congress	
2.	1998	11th	Rajpur		Indian National Congress	Minister of Health
3.	2008	13th	Pansemal		Indian National Congress	Member of the Public Accounts Committee (PAC)
4.	2013	14th	Rajpur		Indian National Congress	
5.	2018	15th	Rajpur		Indian National Congress	Home Minister
6.	2023	16th	Rajpur	Indian National Congress		
