= Rajpur, Madhya Pradesh =

Rajpur
- town
- Location in Madhya Pradesh, India Rajpur (India)
- Coordinates: 21°56′20.848″N 75°8′8.333″E
- Country: India
- State: Madhya Pradesh
- District: Barwani

Government
  - Type: Nagar Panchayat
- Elevation: 225 m (738 ft)

Population (2001)
  - Total: 17,913

Languages
  - Official: Hindi
- Time zone: UTC+5:30 (IST)
- PIN: 451447
- Telephone code: 07284
- ISO 3166 code: IN-MP footnotes
- Vehicle registration: MP-46

Rajpur is a town and a nagar panchayat in Barwani district in the Indian state of Madhya Pradesh. Integrated Border Check Post at Agra Mumbai Highway run by Government of Madhya Pradesh is at Balsamud in Rajpur tehsil.

== Geography ==
Rajpur is located at 21.93°N 75.13°E. It has an average elevation of 225 metres (738 feet).

== Demographics ==
As per Census of India 2011, Rajpur Nagar Panchayat has population of 20,947 of which 10,718 are males while 10,229 are females. The population of children aged 0-6 is 2706 which is 12.92 % of total population of Rajpur (NP). In Rajpur Nagar Panchayat, the female sex ratio is 954 against state average of 931. Moreover the child sex ratio in Rajpur is around 947 compared to Madhya Pradesh state average of 918. The literacy rate of Rajpur city is 76.19 % higher than the state average of 69.32 %. In Rajpur, male literacy is around 83.64 % while the female literacy rate is 68.38 %.
