= Barwani district =

- District
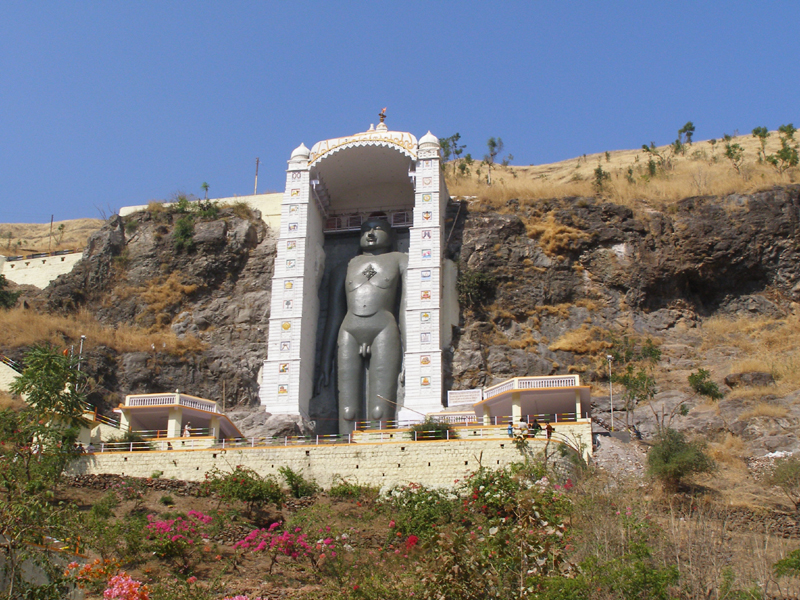
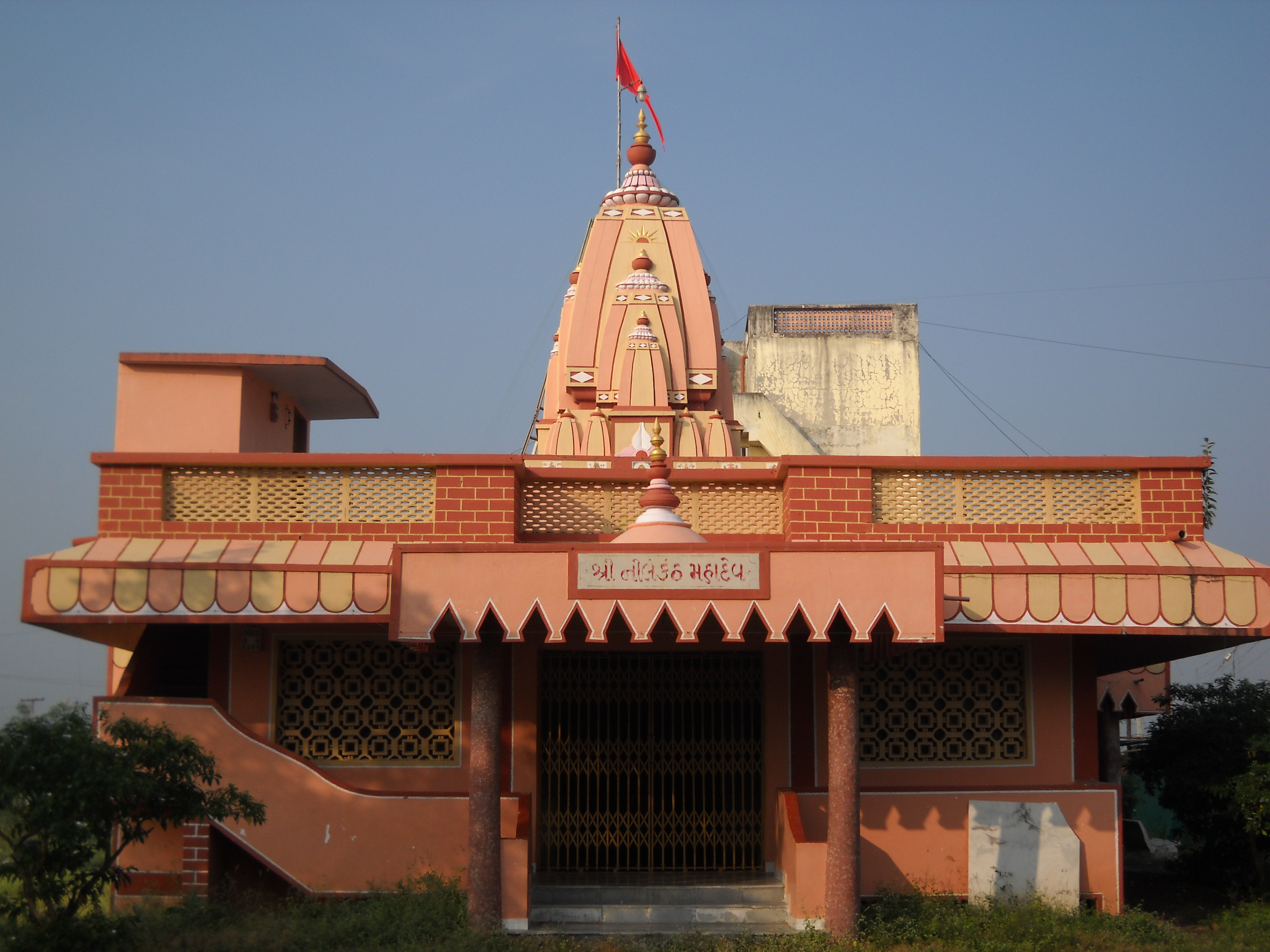
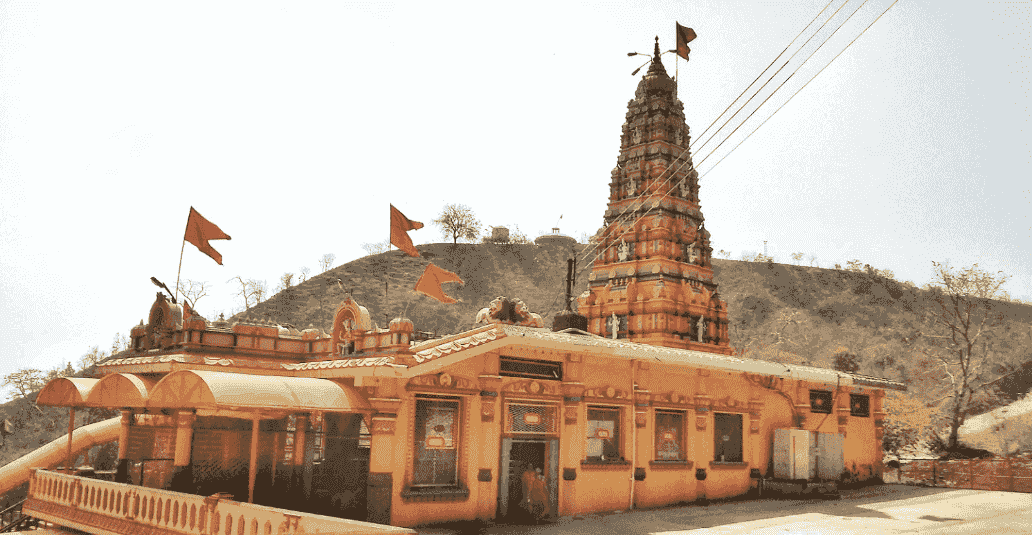
- top - Bawangaja Jain Temple, Vaishno mata Mandir, Bottom - Bijasan Mata temple, Sendhwa

- Location of Barwani district in Madhya Pradesh
- Country: India
- State: Madhya Pradesh
- Division: Indore
- Established: 25 May 1998
- Headquarters: Barwani
- Tehsils: 1. Barwani; 2. Thikri; 3. Rajpur; 4. Sendhwa; 5. Pansemal; 6. Niwali; 7. Anjad; 8. Pati; 9. Warla

Government
  - District collector: Shivraj Singh Verma (IAS)
  - Lok Sabha constituencies: 1. Khargone (shared with Barwani district)
  - Vidhan Sabha constituencies: 4

Area
  - Total: 5,427 km^{2} (2,095 sq mi)

Population (2011)
  - Total: 1,385,881
  - Density: 255.4/km^{2} (661.4/sq mi)
  - Urban: 14.72%

Demographics
  - Literacy: 49.08%
  - Sex ratio: 982
- Time zone: UTC+05:30 (IST)
- Vehicle registration: MP-46
- Major highways: MP SH 26; MP SH 36
- Website: barwani.nic.in

Barwani district (Hindi pronunciation: [bəɽʋaːniː]) is one of the districts of Madhya Pradesh state of India. The administrative headquarters of the district is at Barwani.

Barwani district has an area of 5,427 km² and a population 1,385,881 (2011 census). The district lies in the southwestern corner of Madhya Pradesh; the Narmada River forms its northern boundary. The Satpura Range lies to its south. The district is bordered by Maharashtra state to the south, Gujarat state to the west, Dhar District to the north and Khargone District to the east.

== Economy ==
In 2006 the Ministry of Panchayati Raj named Barwani one of the country's 250 most backward districts (out of a total of 640). It is one of the 24 districts in Madhya Pradesh currently receiving funds from the Backward Regions Grant Fund Programme (BRGF).

=== Agriculture and Industries ===
The district hosts industries like textile manufacturing, cotton ginning mill, oilseed processing, food processing, and small-scale agro-based enterprises, contributing to its economic development.

Barwani district's agriculture is predominantly focused on crops like cotton, soybeans, wheat, and maize, owing to its fertile soil and favorable climate. This is one of the major cotton producing areas of the state.

== Divisions ==
The district is divided into two sub-divisions, Barwani and Sendhwa, which are further divided in to nine tahsils, Barwani, Sendhwa, Pansemal, Warla (Varla) Niwali, Thikri, Pati, Anjad and Rajpur, and seven developmental blocks, Barwani, Pati, Sendhawa, Pansemal, Niwali, Thikari and Rajpur. The four Vidhan Sabha constituencies in this district are Pansemal [Pansemal Tehsil+Niwali Tehsil], Barwani [Barwani+Pati], Sendhwa [Sendhwa Tehsil] and Rajpur [Rajpur+Anjad+Thikari+Balsamud]. Barwani, Sendhawa, Pansemal and Rajpur assembly constituencies are part of Khargone Lok Sabha constituency. The district has 417 panchayats and 715 villages, 646 revenue and 69 forest. Out of these villages, 560 are inhabited and 16 are un-inhabited. The two municipalities in this district are Barwani and Sendhawa.

Sendhwa Tehsil is a centre for the cotton ginning industry. Other places of note include:

- Anjad, a town that houses the Veereshwar Mahadev, Gayatri Temple and Nagari Mata temple, Balaji temple, Bhairav mandir is the famous religious places of the town along with many cotton factory which gives employee to the thousand of local people. Sanjay Cotton Fiber is the most famous and largest Cotton Factory of the region.
- Bawangaja, an important Jain pilgrimage centre lying 6 km from Barwani town. The world's tallest statue of the first Jain Tirthankara Adinatha, is the pride of the town, which also contains as many as eleven 15th-century hindu temples. Kumbhakarna and Indrajeet were said to have attained Nirvana here.
- The ancient fort of Bhawar Garh (Borgarh) is located in the Satpuras, 16 km from Sendhawa.
- Beejasan is a temple of Goddess Beejasani (Durga), located 20 km south of Sendhawa.
- The ancient fort of Ramgarh (Ramgad) is located in the Satpuras, 17 km from Pansemal.
- Ancient Bandhareshwar Temple and Jharna (Waterfall) is located in Bandhara Buzurg Village, 8 km from Pansemal.
- Jalgone Fort and Tin Taal Bawadi (Well) is located in Jagone Village, 4 km from Pansemal.

== Towns of Barwani District ==
- Barwani - Municipality
- Sendhwa - Municipality
- Anjad - Nagar Parishad
- Rajpur - Nagar Parishad
- Pansemal - Nagar Parishad
- Thikri - Nagar Parishad
- Niwali - Nagar Parishad
- Khetia - Nagar Parishad
- Palsud - Nagar Parishad
- Julwania - Nagar Parishad (Notified Area Council)

== Demographics ==
Historical population
Year	Pop.	±% p.a.
1901	143,627	—
1911	196,098	+3.16%
1921	215,853	+0.96%
1931	255,157	+1.69%
1941	293,541	+1.41%
1951	326,990	+1.08%
1961	407,325	+2.22%
1971	517,468	+2.42%
1981	661,208	+2.48%
1991	835,625	+2.37%
2001	1,086,366	+2.66%
2011	1,385,881	+2.46%

Religions in Barwani district (2011)
Religion	Percent
Hinduism	95.16%
Islam	4.20%
Other or not stated	0.64%

According to the 2011 census Barwani District has a population of 1,385,881, roughly equal to the nation of Eswatini or the US state of Hawaii. This gives it a ranking of 354th in India (out of a total of 640). The district has a population density of 256 inhabitants per square kilometre (660/sq mi). Its population growth rate over the decade 2001-2011 was 27.57%. Barwani has a sex ratio of 982 females for every 1000 males, and a literacy rate of 49.08%. Scheduled Castes and Scheduled Tribes make up 6.35% and 69.42% of the population respectively.

=== Languages ===
Languages of Barwani district (2011)
1. Bareli (49.6%)
2. Nimadi (23.8%)
3. Hindi (9.71%)
4. Bhilali (4.95%)
5. Bhili (3.75%)
6. Khandeshi (2.10%)
7. Gujarati (1.31%)
8. Marathi (1.26%)
9. Banjari (1.04%)
10. Others (2.46%)

At the time of the 2011 Census of India, 49.58% of the population in the district spoke Bareli, 23.84% Nimadi, 9.71% Hindi, 4.95% Bhilali, 3.75% Bhili, 2.10% Khandeshi, 1.31% Gujarati, 1.26% Marathi and 1.04% Banjari as their first language.

Languages spoken include three mutually unintelligible Bareli languages: Palya, a Bhil language with approximately 10 000 speakers centred in Madhya Pradesh; Pauri, with approximately 175 000 speakers, written in the Devanagari script; and Rathwi, with approximately 64,000 speakers. Other languages include Bhilali, with 11 50 000 speakers.

== Notable people ==
- Bala Bachchan ( MLA) Rajpur And Home Minister in 2018 State Government of Madhya Pradesh
- Gajendra Singh Patel (MP) Khargone-Barwani
- Ramesh Patel (MLA) Barwani
- Sumer Singh Solanki (MP Rajyasabha) Barwani

== Tourist places ==
- Nagalwadi
- Bawangaja
- Badi Bijasan Mata Mandir, sendhwa

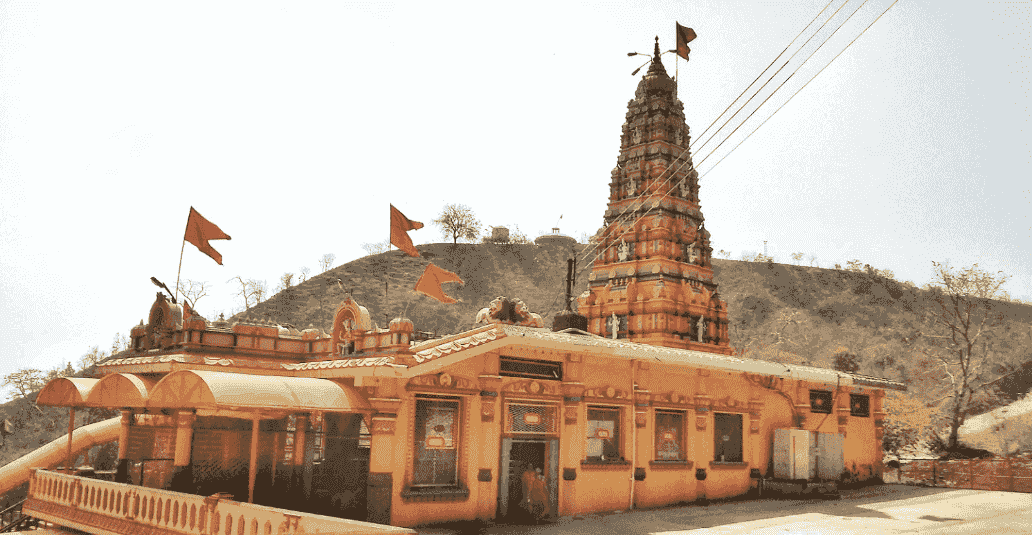
Badi Bijasan Mandir Sendhwa

- Sendhwa Fort
- 108 Shiv Mandir
- Nagri Mata Mandir, Anjad
- Tir Gola Monument

== Villages ==
- Bahía Creek
- Balkunwa
- Mandil
- Pipri Buzurg
