= Barwani =

- Town
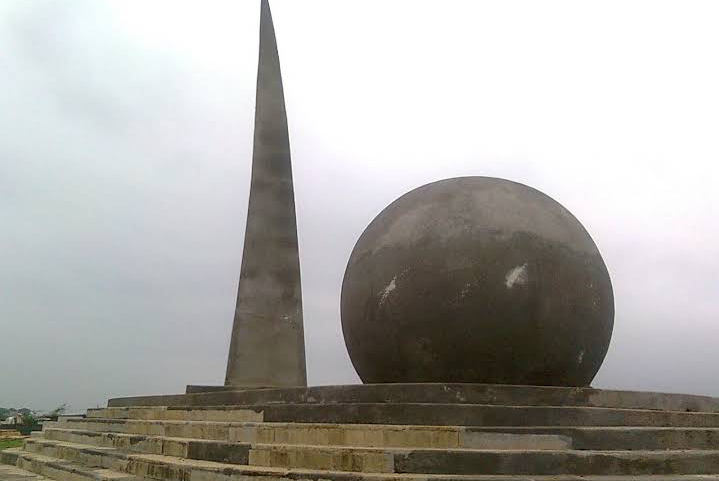
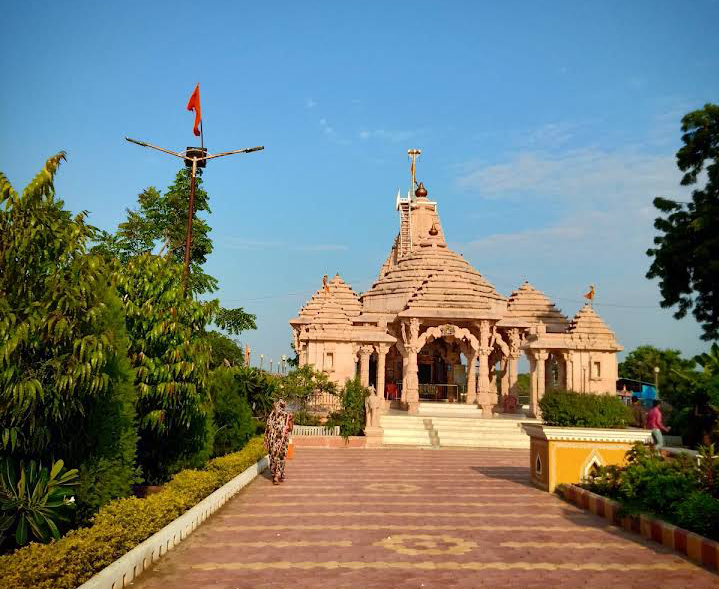
- Sawariya Seth Mandir; Tir Gola Monument
- Nickname: Paris of Nimar
- Location within Madhya Pradesh Location within India
- Coordinates: 22.03°N 74.9°E
- Country: India
- State: Madhya Pradesh
- Region: Nimar
- District: Barwani district

Government
  - Type: Municipal council
  - Body: Municipal Council of Barwani
  - Chairperson: Smt. Ashwini Chauhan (BJP)

Area
  - Total: 27 km^{2} (10 sq mi)
- Elevation: 178 m (584 ft)

Population (2011)
  - Total: 55,504
  - Density: 2,100/km^{2} (5,300/sq mi)
- Demonym: Nimadi

Languages
  - Official: Hindi; English
  - Regional: Hindi; Nimadi
- Time zone: UTC+5:30 (IST)
- PIN: 451551
- Telephone code: 07290
- Vehicle registration: MP-46
- Website: barwani.nic.in

Barwani or Badwani (Hindi: Baḍwāni) is a municipal town in Barwani district of Madhya Pradesh, India, that is situated near the left bank of the Narmada River. It is the administrative headquarters of Barwani district and has also served as the capital of the former princely state of Barwani. Barwani is only accessible by road.

== Origin of name ==
The name Barwani originated from the words Bad and Wani. The Forests of "Bad" surrounded the city in old times and "Wani" is an old word meaning "the garden", translating to the Garden of Bad. Despite its official spelling, Barwani is pronounced as "Badwani".

== Geography ==
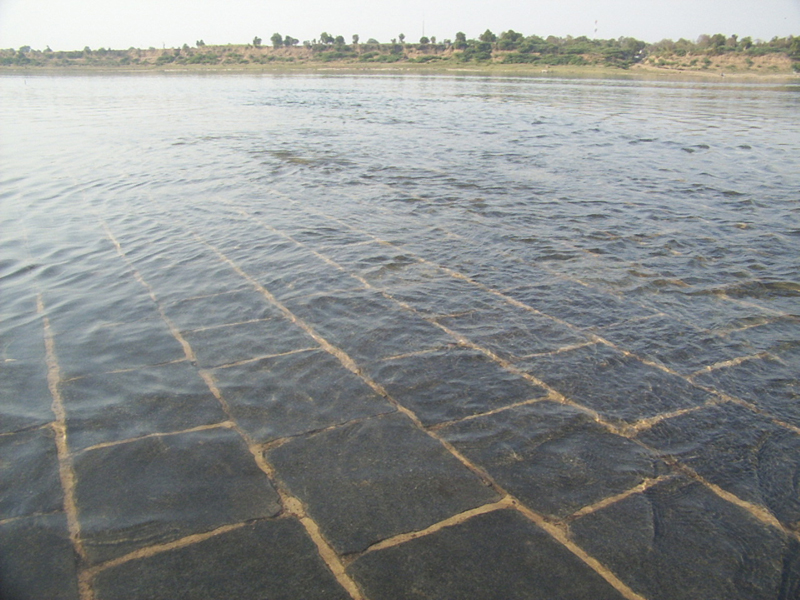
Rajghat, Barwani

Barwani is located at 22.03°N 74.9°E. It has an average elevation of 178 meters (583 feet). The Narmada River flows through Barwani; it is 5 km (3.1 miles) from the city centre. The maximum temperature of Barwani in April and May used to reach 48 °C (118 °F), making it one of the hottest places in Central India. However, in recent years, it has cooled down.

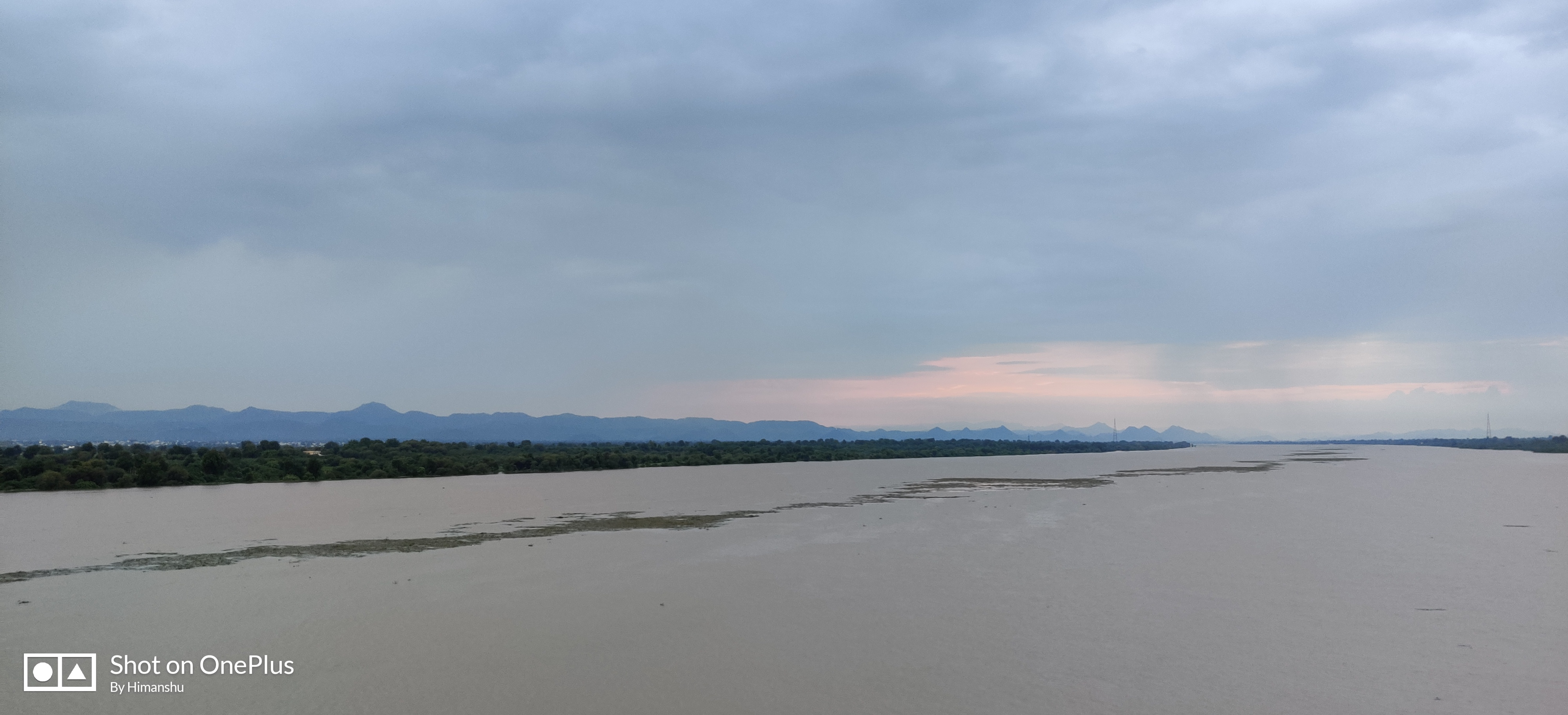
Narmada River View with Satpura Mountain Ranges in the backdrop

The hills of the Satpura Range surround Barwani. The city is also called the "Paris of Nimar" ("area beyond Neem trees"). Nimar is split into East Nimar and West Nimar; Barwani lies in West Nimar. The annual rainfall of Barwani is around 15 in (38 cm), though since 2006 it has increased significantly. Barwani is famous for its papayas and Bawangaja, a Jain holy place 8 km (5.0 miles) from Barwani.

== Transport ==
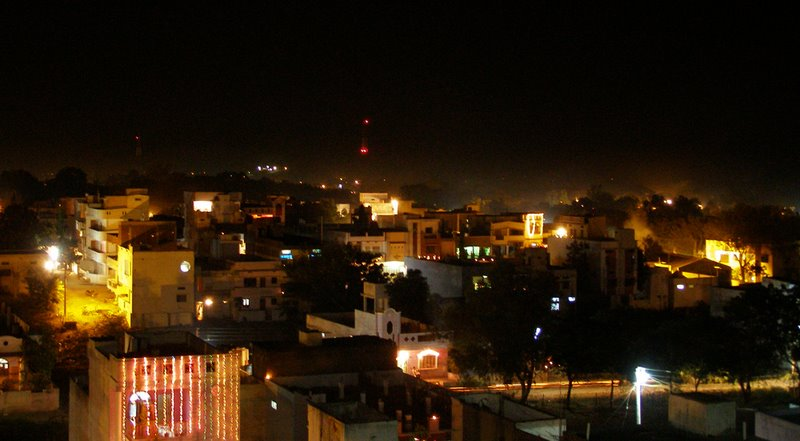
Barwani at night

Barwani has no immediate connectivity through rail but is easily accessible via roadways. The nearest airport is indore.

=== Railways ===
Barwani has no direct rail connectivity the nearest station to the town is at Indore. Western Railways (Ratlam Mandal) has a reservation counter in Ambedkar Park on Rajghat Road. There is also a railway station at Khandwa on the Central Railway, which is 180 km (110 miles) from Barwani via State Highway 26.

=== Roads ===
Barwani is well connected to other parts of Madhya Pradesh and other states via national and state highways. The town is connected to the Agra-Bombay national highway number three by the Khandwa-Baroda interstate highway no. 26 at a distance of 51 km (32 miles) at Thikri. Bus services connect the town with the major and minor cities near Barwani, including Indore, Khandwa, Dhar, Barwaha, Khargone, Mumbai, Ahmedabad, and Vadodara.

== Demographics ==
Religions in Barwani
Religion	Percent
Hindus	85.0%
Muslims	10.0%
Jains	3.0%
Buddhist	1.0%
Others†	1.0%
Distribution of religions †Includes Sikhs (1.0%), Buddhists (<0.5%).

As of the 2011 Census of India, Barwani had a population of 55,504, consisting of 28,437 males (51%) and 27,067 females (49%).

The population of children aged 0–6 was 6,961 (12.54%). In Barwani Municipality, the male-to-female sex ratio is 1,000:952 against the state average of 1,000:931. The child male-to-female sex ratio in Barwani is around 1000:919, compared with the Madhya Pradesh state average of 1000:918. The literacy rate of Barwani City is 82.10% compared with the state's average of 69.32%. In Barwani, male literacy is around 87.17%, while the female literacy rate is 76.80%.

Schedule Tribes (ST) constitutes 23.29% while Schedule Castes (SC) were 9.95% of the population in Barwani.

Out of the total population, 18,438 were engaged in work or business activity. Of these, 13,957 were males and 4,481 were females. In a census survey, a worker is defined as a person who does business, job, service, and cultivator and labour activity. With 18,438 people in the working population, 89.06% were engaged in Main Work while 10.94% of total workers were engaged in marginal work.

== Economy ==
While Barwani is not heavily industrialized, it does have some industries, including those producing electronic products and heavy machinery. Economically, Barwani engages in agricultural crops and wood, with several other small industries developing in the area. Barwani mainly has edible oil mills and cotton ginning factories which are the mainstay of the economy.Small-scale agro-based enterprises contribute to the district's economic development.

== Culture ==
=== Main festivals ===
The major festivals of Holi, Raksha Bandhan, Ganesh Utsav, Navratri, Dussehra, Deepavali, Muharram, Gudi Padwa, Gangaur, Bhai Dooj, Eid al-Fitr, and Eid al-Adha, Christmas and Naga Panchami are all celebrated with equal enthusiasm. Barwani is known for jhakis (झाकी) (glimpse or view) during Ganesh Utsav and Tajiye during Muharram.

== Places of interest ==
- Bawangaja (Jain Mandir) is a temple.
- Rajghat (Narmada River) is a significant ghat of Narmada River, A ghat on the Narmada River, offering a peaceful atmosphere.
- Sawariya Seth Mandir.
- Tir Gola, located on Khandwa-Baroda Road, built in memory of the late son of Raja Ranjit Singh.

== Healthcare ==
Barwani is prominent in the Nimar and Malwa regions for its healthcare facilities and its private hospitals. Barwani District Hospital is one of the oldest hospitals in Madhya Pradesh.

== Notable people ==
- Dr. Anil Kakodkar - India's eminent nuclear physicist, and former chairman of the Atomic Energy Commission of India and the Secretary to the Government of India, Department of Atomic Energy, was born in Barwani.
- Sumer Singh Solanki A Indian Politician
- Bhima Nayak, an Indian revolutionary

== Gallery ==
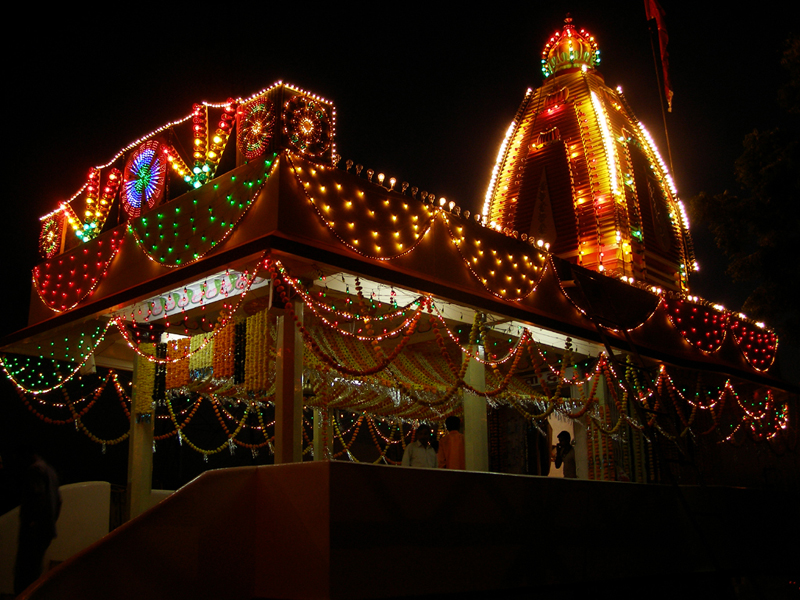
Vaishno Devi Mandir during festival, Barwani

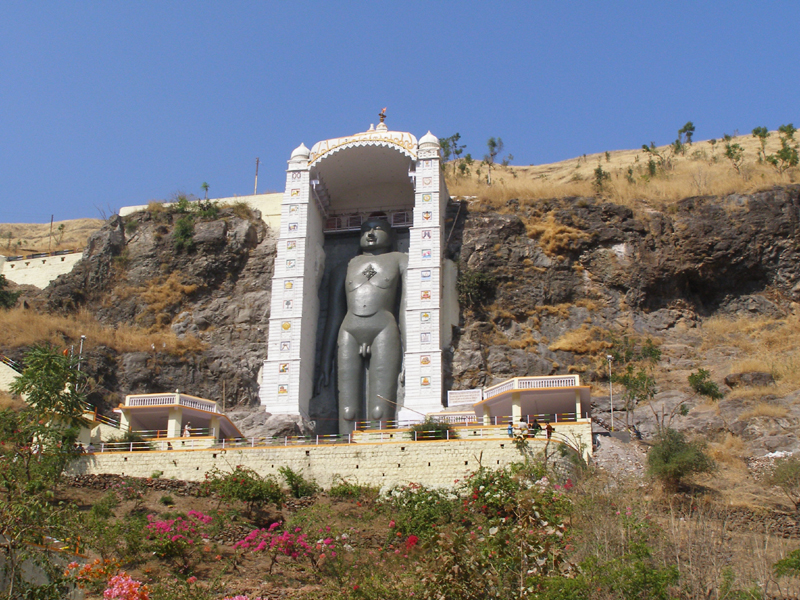
84 feet tall, huge statue of Bhagwan Rishabhadeva at Bawangaja

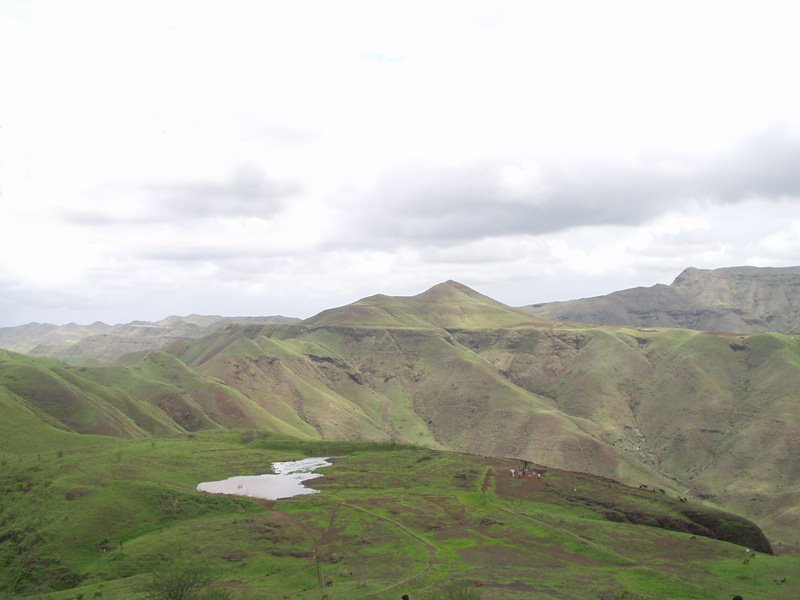
Beauty of Satpura Hills

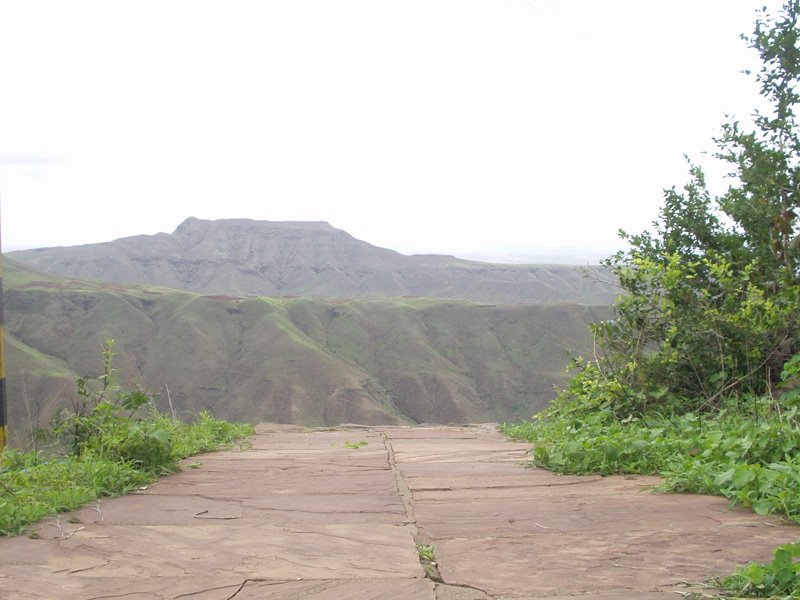
Beautiful Satpura Hills, Barwani

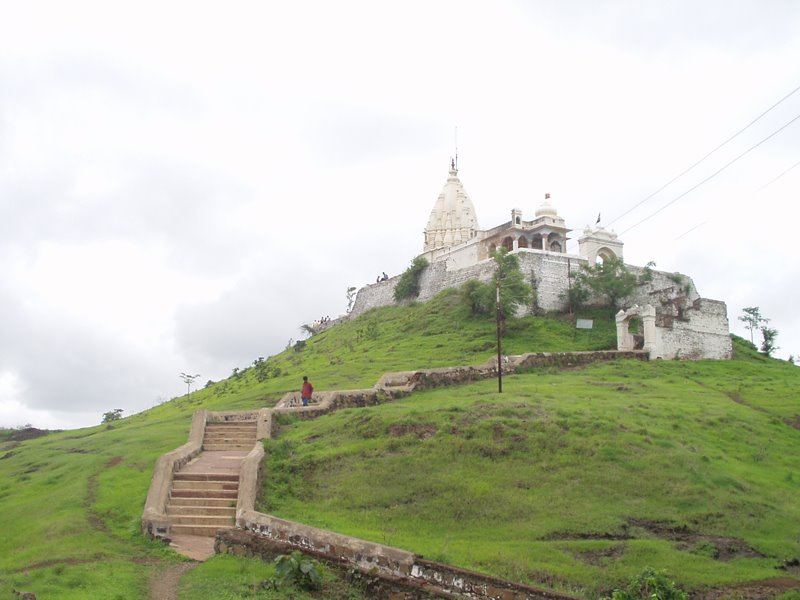

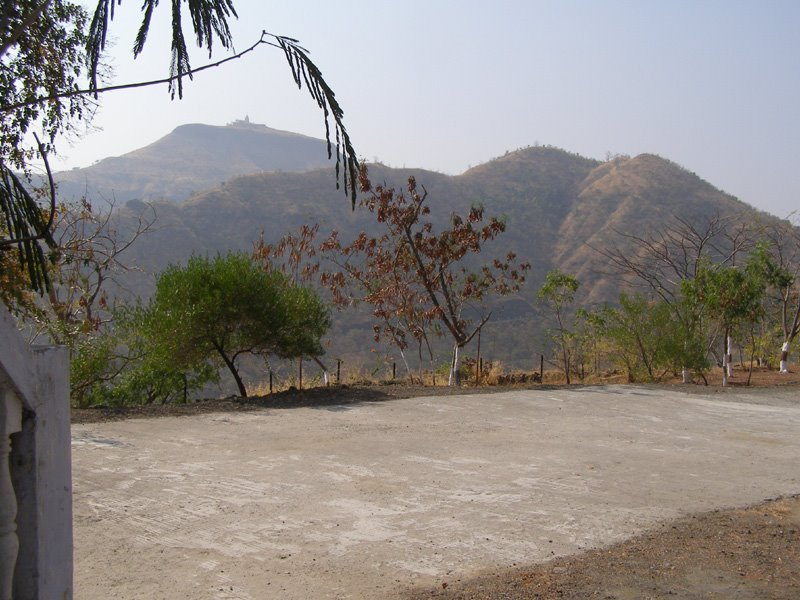
Choolgiri View from forest point

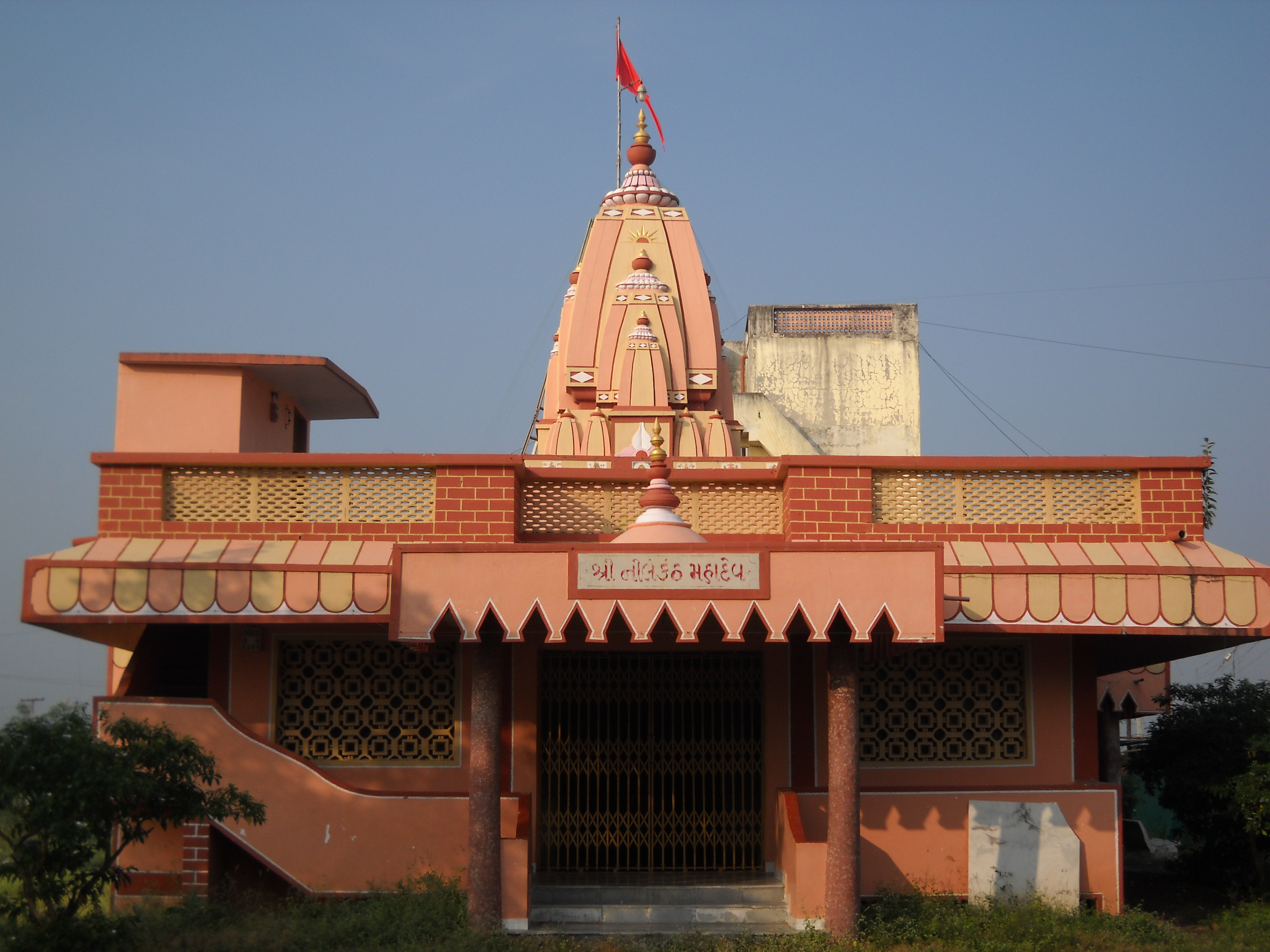
MAA VAISHNO DEVI MANDIR
