= Sendhwa =

Sendhwa Sendhawa
- Municipality
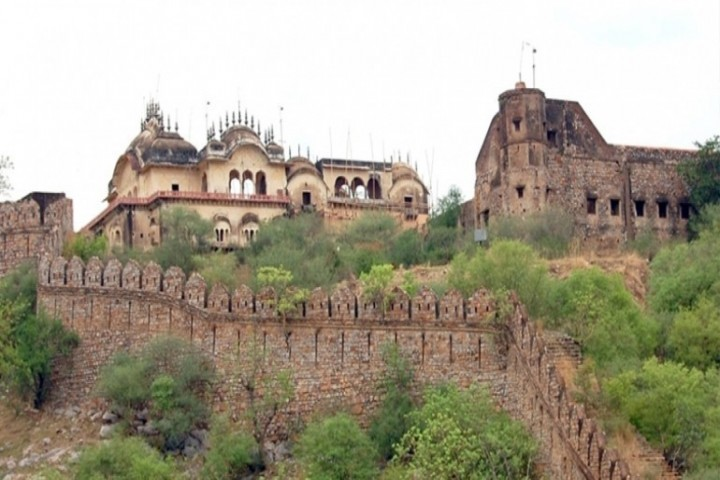
- Sendhwa Fort

- Location in Madhya Pradesh, India
- Coordinates: 21°41′05″N 75°05′43″E
- Country: India
- State: Madhya Pradesh
- District: Barwani

Area
  - Total: 18 km^{2} (6.9 sq mi)
- Elevation: 409 m (1,342 ft)

Population (2011)
  - Total: 56,485
  - Density: 3,100/km^{2} (8,100/sq mi)

Languages
  - Official: Hindi
- Time zone: UTC+5:30 (IST)
- PIN: 451666
- Telephone code: 07281
- Vehicle registration: MP 46
- Sex ratio: 926 per 1000 males ♂/♀

Sendhwa is a city with a municipal government in Barwani district in the Indian state of Madhya Pradesh. It is the headquarters for Sendhwa Tehsil and Sub Division.

== Geography ==
Sendhwa is located at MH&MP Border 21.68°N 75.1°E. It has an average elevation of 409 metres (1341 feet).

== Demographics ==
As of the 2011 Census of India, Sendhwa had a population of 56,485. Males constitute 52% of the population and females 48%. Sendhwa has an average literacy rate of 63%, higher than the national average of 59.5%: male literacy is 70%, and female literacy is 55%. In Sendhwa, 17% of the population is under 6 years of age.

== Economy ==
Sendhwa is primarily agricultural and forest lands. Mechanised farming has only been recently introduced. Cotton is a big crop, as are pulses, such as mung beans and moth beans.

== Government ==
Sendhawa Assembly constituency is one of the 230 Vidhan Sabha (Legislative Assembly) constituencies of Madhya Pradesh state in central India.

== Administration ==
Sendhwa is a Municipality city in district of Barwani, Madhya Pradesh. The Sendhwa city is divided into 24 wards for which elections are held every 5 years.

Sendhwa Municipality has total administration over 10,108 houses to which it supplies basic amenities like water and sewerage. It is also authorize to build roads within Municipality limits and impose taxes on properties coming under its jurisdiction.
