= Khargone Lok Sabha constituency =

Lok Sabha Constituency in Madhya Pradesh, India

Coordinates: 22.02°N 74.91°E

Khargone
- Lok Sabha constituency
- Interactive Map Outlining Khargone Lok Sabha constituency

Constituency details
- Country: India
- Region: Central India
- State: Madhya Pradesh
- Assembly constituencies: Maheshwar; Kasrawad; Khargone; Bhagwanpura; Sendhawa; Rajpur; Pansemal; Barwani
- Established: 1962
- Total electors: 1,821,019
- Reservation: ST

Member of Parliament
- 18th Lok Sabha
- Incumbent Gajendra Patel
- Party: BJP
- Elected year: 2024
- Preceded by: Subhash Patel

Khargone Lok Sabha constituency (Hindi: खरगौन लोकसभा निर्वाचन क्षेत्र) is one of the 29 Lok Sabha (parliamentary) constituencies in the Indian state of Madhya Pradesh state in central India. This constituency came into existence in 1962. It is reserved for the candidates belonging to the Scheduled Tribes and covers the entire Barwani district and part of Khargone district.

== Vidhan Sabha segments ==
Presently, Khargone Lok Sabha constituency comprises the following eight Vidhan Sabha segments:

No	Name	District	Member	Party	2024 Lead
183	Maheshwar (SC)	Khargone	Rajkumar Mev	BJP	BJP
184	Kasrawad	Khargone	Sachin Yadav	INC	BJP
185	Khargone	Khargone	Balkrishn Patidar	BJP	BJP
186	Bhagwanpura (ST)	Khargone	Kedar Chidabhai Dawar	INC	INC
187	Sendhawa (ST)	Barwani	Montu Solanki	INC	INC
188	Rajpur (ST)	Barwani	Bala Bachchan	INC	BJP
189	Pansemal (ST)	Barwani	Shyam Barde	BJP	INC
190	Barwani (ST)	Barwani	Rajan Mandloi	INC	BJP

== Members of Parliament ==
Year	Member	Party
1962	Ramchandra Bade	Bharatiya Jana Sangh
1967	Shashi Bhushan	Indian National Congress
1971	Ramchandra Bade	Bharatiya Jana Sangh
1977	Rameshwar Patidar	Janata Party
1980	Subhash Yadav	Indian National Congress
1984	Subhash Yadav	Indian National Congress
1989	Rameshwar Patidar	Bharatiya Janata Party
1991	Rameshwar Patidar	Bharatiya Janata Party
1996	Rameshwar Patidar	Bharatiya Janata Party
1998	Rameshwar Patidar	Bharatiya Janata Party
1999	Tarachand Patel	Indian National Congress
2004	Krishna Murari Moghe	Bharatiya Janata Party
2007^	Arun Yadav	Indian National Congress
2009	Makhansingh Solanki	Bharatiya Janata Party
2014	Subhash Patel	Bharatiya Janata Party
2019	Gajendra Patel	Bharatiya Janata Party
2024	Gajendra Patel	Bharatiya Janata Party

^ by poll

== Election results ==
=== General election 2024 ===
2024 Indian general election: Khargone
Party	Candidate	Votes	%	±%
BJP	Gajendra Patel	819,863	52.6	
INC	Porlal Kharte	6,84,845	43.93	
NOTA	None of the above	18,257	1.17	
Majority		1,35,018		
Turnout			76.03	▼1.82
BJP hold		Swing		

=== General election 2019 ===
2019 Indian general elections: Khargone
Party	Candidate	Votes	%	±%
BJP	Gajendra Umrao Singh Patel	773,550	54.19	+2.56
INC	Dr. Govind Mujalda	5,71,040	40.00	−5.79
CPI	Comrade Jyoti Sukhlal Gore	20,673	1.45	−0.82
BSP	Amit Kumar Balke	18,573	1.30	+0.58
Independent	Shantilal Aasharam Sahite	10,265	0.72	+0.72
Independent	Sevanti Dinesh Bhabar	9,753	0.68	+0.68
Independent	Jani Karan	5,330	0.37	+0.37
NOTA	None of the Above	18,423	1.29	−0.64
Margin of victory		2,02,510	14.18	−8.36
Turnout		14,28,002	77.85	+10.18
BJP hold		Swing		

=== General election 2014 ===
2014 Indian general elections: Khargone
Party	Candidate	Votes	%	±%
BJP	Subhash Patel	6,49,354	56.75	
INC	Ramesh Patel	3,91,475	34.21	
AAP	Kailash Awasya	31,222	2.73	
CPI	Comrade Jyoti Gore	25,930	2.27	
BSP	Naharsingh Richhuji Barde	8,266	0.72	
Independent	Gaffar Noor Mo.	8,553	0.75	
Independent	Gangaram Pratap Gawle	8,544	0.75	
NOTA	None of the Above	22,141	1.93	
Margin of victory		2,57,879	22.54	
Turnout		11,44,259	67.67	
BJP hold		Swing		

=== General election 2009 ===
2009 Indian general elections: Khargone
Party	Candidate	Votes	%	±%
BJP	Makhansingh Solanki	3,51,296	46.19	
INC	Bala Bachchan	3,17,121	41.70	
CPI	Bhai Kiransingh Badole (Kiresh)	31,905	4.19	
Margin of victory		34,175	4.49	
Turnout		7,60,555	60.18	
BJP gain from INC		Swing		

== See also ==
- Khargone district
- Barwani district
- List of constituencies of the Lok Sabha
