= Vijay Singh (disambiguation) =

Vijay Singh (born 1963) is a Fijian professional golfer.

Vijay Singh may also refer to:

- Vijay Singh (activist) (born 1962), Indian anti-corruption activist
- Vijay Singh (civil servant) (born 1948), Indian civil servant
- Vijay Singh (Fijian politician), Fijian politician
- Vijay Singh (filmmaker), Indian filmmaker and writer
- Vijay Singh (Indian politician) (born 1974), Indian politician in Uttar Pradesh
- Vijay Singh (Karnataka politician)
- Vijay Singh of Marwar (1729–1793), ruler of Marwar
- Vijay Singh Chauhan, Indian decathlete
- Vijay Singh Gujjar, Indian outlaw
- Vijay Singh Pathik, Indian revolutionary
- Vijay Singh Solanki, Indian politician
- Vijay Singh Soy, Indian politician
- Vijay Singh Yadav (1953–2021), Indian politician
- Vijay Bahadur Singh (born 1940), Indian politician
- V. K. Singh (born 1951), Indian politician and former army general
- Vijay Prakash Singh (born c. 1954), Indian gastroenterologist
- Vijay P. Singh (born 1946), American hydrologist
- Vijay Pal Singh (born 1967), Indian pole vaulter
- Vijay R. Singh (1931–2006), Indo-Fijian lawyer and politician
- Vijay Singh, the fictional protagonist of the 1979 Indian film Kaala Patthar, portrayed by Amitabh Bachchan
- Vijay Singh, a fictional character in the 2004 Indian film Police Force, portrayed by Akshay Kumar
- Vir Vijay Singh, a fictional IRS (Indian Revenue Service) officer portrayed by Danny Denzongpa in the 2002 Indian film 16 December

== See also ==
- Vijayasimha (r. 1188–1210 CE), a ruler of the Kalachuri dynasty of Tripuri in central India
- Wijesinghe and Wijesinha, Sinhalese surnames
- Vijay (disambiguation)
- Singh, an Indian surname
