= Kotha Bujurg =

- Village
- Location in Madhya Pradesh, India Kotha Bujurg (India)
- Coordinates: 21.731°N 75.561°E
- Country: India
- State: Madhya Pradesh
- District: Khargone

Government
  - Type: Sarpanch
  - Body: Gram panchayat
- Elevation: 198 m (650 ft)

Population (2011)
  - Total: 1,396

Languages
  - Official: Hindi
- Time zone: UTC+5:30 (IST)
- PIN: 452001
- Telephone code: 07282
- ISO 3166 code: IN-MP
- Vehicle registration: MP-10
- Spoken Languages: Hindi, Bhili, Devanagari

Kotha Bujurg is a village in Gogawan tehsil in the Khargone district (previously known as West Nimar) of Madhya Pradesh, India. It belongs to the Indore division. It is located 13 km south of the district headquarters in Khargone and 298 km from the state capital Bhopal.
