= Khargone Assembly constituency =

Constituency of the Madhya Pradesh legislative assembly in India

Coordinates: 21.83°N 75.61°E

Khargone
- Constituency No. 185 for the Madhya Pradesh Legislative Assembly

Constituency details
- Country: India
- Region: Central India
- State: Madhya Pradesh
- District: Khargone
- Lok Sabha constituency: Khargone
- Established: 1951
- Reservation: None

Member of Legislative Assembly
- 16th Madhya Pradesh Legislative Assembly
- Incumbent Balkrishan Patidar
- Party: Bharatiya Janata Party
- Elected year: 2023
- Preceded by: Ravi Joshi

Khargone Assembly constituency is one of the 230 Vidhan Sabha (Legislative Assembly) constituencies of Madhya Pradesh state in central India.

It is part of Khargone district.

== Members of the Legislative Assembly ==
Election	Name	Party
1952	Ramchandra Bade	Bharatiya Jana Sangh
1957	Khode Ramakant	Indian National Congress
1962	Bhalchandra Bagdare	Bharatiya Janata Party
1967	B Rakhmaji	Indian National Congress
1972	Chandrakanta Ramakant Khode	Indian National Congress
1977	Navneet Mahajan	Janata Party
1980	Chandra Kanta Ramakant	Indian National Congress (Indira)
1985	Karuna Dangi	Indian National Congress
1990	Rai Singh Rathore	Bharatiya Janata Party
1993	Parasram Baboolal Dandir	Indian National Congress
1998	Parasram Baboolal Dandir	Indian National Congress
2003	Babulal Mahajan	Bharatiya Janata Party
2008	Balkrishan Patidar	Bharatiya Janata Party
2013	Balkrishan Patidar	Bharatiya Janata Party
2018	Ravi Joshi	Indian National Congress
2023	Balkrishan Patidar	Bharatiya Janata Party

== Election results ==
=== 2023 ===
2023 Madhya Pradesh Legislative Assembly election: Khargone
Party	Candidate	Votes	%	±%
BJP	Balkrishan Patidar	101,683	51.63	+7.1
INC	Ravi Joshi	87,918	44.64	−5.28
NOTA	None of the above	1,409	0.72	−0.68
Majority		13,765	6.99	+1.6
Turnout		196,930	81.09	+0.68
BJP gain from INC		Swing		

=== 2018 ===
2018 Madhya Pradesh Legislative Assembly election: Khargone
Party	Candidate	Votes	%	±%
INC	Ravi Rameshchandra Joshi	88,208	49.92	
BJP	Balkrishan Patidar	78,696	44.53	
Sapaks Party	Kamlesh Bhandari	3,526	2.0	
NOTA	None of the above	2,480	1.4	
Majority		9,512	5.39	
Turnout		176,711	80.41	

== See also ==
- Khargone
