= Toksar =

- Village
- Location within Madhya Pradesh Location within India
- Coordinates: 22°10′28″N 75°59′3″E
- Country: India
- State: Madhya Pradesh

Toksar is a village in Barwah tehsil in Khargone district of Madhya Pradesh, India. It belongs to the Indore division and is located on the south bank of the Narmada River, about 10 km west of Sanawad and 75 km south of Indore. In 2018, its population was 1,473 inhabitants with 758 males and 715 females.

The majority of the population are Hindi speaking Gurjar, and farmers, mainly growing soya bean, wheat, cotton, arbi etc. Toksar has become a small stop during the Panchkosi Parikrama which starts in Omkareshwar and lasts 5 days. Toksar was awarded the Nirmal Gram Puraskar ("clean village prize") in 2008. It has a school and a hospital.
