= Narmada Nagar =

- Township/Project Area
- Location in Madhya Pradesh
- Coordinates: 22°16′40″N 76°27′50″E
- Country: India
- State: Madhya Pradesh
- Region: west Nimar
- District: Khandwa District
- Established: 100 year Old

Government
  - Type: Democratic
  - Body: Village Panchayat
  - Sarpanch: Mr.mahesh jaiswal (BJP)

Population (2011)
  - Total: 9,198
- Demonym: NN
- Time zone: UTC+5:30 (IST)
- Spoken Languages: Hindi, English, Nimari

Narmada Nagar is a township in Punasa Tehsil in East Nimar district of Madhya Pradesh, India. It belongs to Indore division.

It is located 49 km north of District headquarters Khandwa. 14 km from Punasa. 179 km from State capital Bhopal.

Jamkota (4 km), Pipalkota (5 km), Gulgaon Rayat (6 km), Purni (7 km), and Anjaniya Kala (8 km) are the nearby villages to Narmada Nagar.

Narmada Nagar is surrounded by Baladi Tehsil towards the east, Harsud Tehsil towards the east, Khirkiya Tehsil towards the east, and Khandwa Tehsil towards the south.

Sanawad, Harda, and Nepanagar are the nearby cities to Narmada Nagar.

== About ==
Narmada Nagar is a small town, established in around 1985, by Narmada Valley Development Authority and afterwards by Narmada Hydroelectric Development Corporation. It was earlier known as Asinder, after the king of Punasa, a neighboring town. It has a Panchayat which falls under Mandhata Constituency.

Narmada Nagar is famous for the Indirasagar Dam, whose reservoir is amongst Asia's largest. The dam is also a major site of tourist attraction, as every monsoon a lot of people visit Narmada Nagar, to catch a glimpse of the spillway water. Because of the dam being a popular landmark, Narmada Nagar is often referred to as "Punasa Dam".

== Education ==
The town has the following schools:

1. Kendriya Vidyalaya
2. Government Middle School
3. Government Higher Secondary School
4. Government Senior Secondary School
5. Saraswati Shishu Vidya Mandir
6. Lions Higher Secondary School
