= Sachin Yadav (Madhya Pradesh politician) =

Indian politician

- सचिन यादव
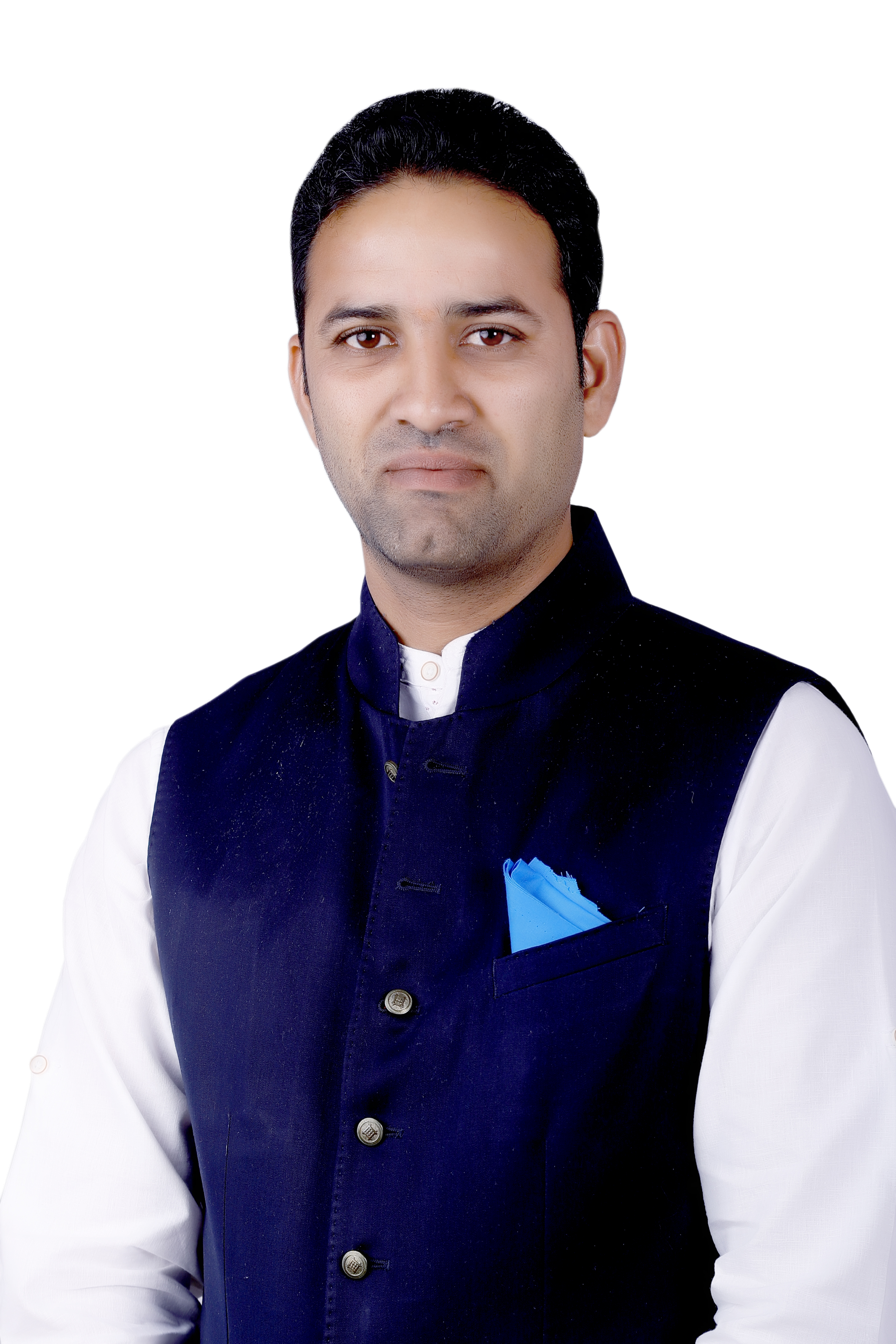

Member of the Madhya Pradesh Legislative Assembly
- Incumbent
- Assumed office 2013
- Preceded by: Atma Ram Patel
- Constituency: Kasrawad

Personal details
- Born: 10 January 1982 (age 44) Borawan, Madhya Pradesh, India
- Citizenship: Indian
- Party: Indian National Congress
- Parent: Subhash Yadav (father)
- Relatives: Arun Yadav (brother)
- Education: BCom
- Alma mater: Cardiff Metropolitan University
- Profession: Politician

Sachin Subhashchandra Yadav (born 10 January 1982) is an Indian politician from Madhya Pradesh. He is a thiree-time MLA from Kasrawad Constituency of Khargone District representing the Indian National Congress and a former cabinet minister in the government of Madhya Pradesh from 2018 to 2020.

== Early life and education ==
Yadav is from Kasrawad, Khargone District, Madhya Pradesh. He is the son of the late Congress leader Subhash Yadav, who was a former Deputy Chief Minister, and the brother of former Union Minister of State and Former MP Congress chief Arun Yadav. He completed his graduation in commerce in 2003 at a college affiliated with Barkatullah University.

== Career ==
Yadav won the 2023 Madhya Pradesh Legislative Assembly election representing the Indian National Congress from Kasrawad Assembly constituency. He polled 102,761 votes and defeated his nearest rival, Atmaram Patel of the Bharatiya Janata Party, by a margin of 5,672 votes. He became an MLA for the first time winning the 2013 Madhya Pradesh Legislative Assembly election defeating Atmaram Patel from Kasrawad Seat. He retained the seat for the Congress Party, in the 2018 Madhya Pradesh Legislative Assembly election, once again beating Atmaram Patel of the BJP. He then became an MLA for the third consecutive time in 2023. He began electoral politics in 2008 but lost to Atmaram Patel.

On 25 December 2018, he took the oath as Cabinet Minister in the Madhya Pradesh Government headed by Kamalnath. He held the farmers welfare and agricultural development department, department of horticulture and food processing department.

== See also ==
- Madhya Pradesh Legislative Assembly
- 2013 Madhya Pradesh Legislative Assembly election
- 2008 Madhya Pradesh Legislative Assembly election
