= Bhagwanpura Assembly constituency =

Constituency of the Madhya Pradesh legislative assembly in India

Coordinates: 21.68°N 75.59°E

Bhagwanpura
- Constituency No. 186 for the Madhya Pradesh Legislative Assembly

Constituency details
- Country: India
- Region: Central India
- State: Madhya Pradesh
- District: Khargone
- Lok Sabha constituency: Khargone
- Established: 2008
- Reservation: ST

Member of Legislative Assembly
- 16th Madhya Pradesh Legislative Assembly
- Incumbent Kedar Chidabhai Dawar
- Party: Indian National Congress
- Elected year: 2023
- Preceded by: Vijay Singh Solanki

Bhagwanpura is one of the 230 Vidhan Sabha (Legislative Assembly) constituencies of Madhya Pradesh state in central India.

It is part of Khargone District.

== Members of the Legislative Assembly ==
Election	Name	Party
2008	Jamna Singh Solanki	Bharatiya Janata Party
2013	Vijay Singh Solanki	Indian National Congress
2018	Kedar Chidabhai Dawar	Independent
2023	Kedar Chidabhai Dawar	Indian National Congress

== Election results ==
=== 2023 ===
2023 Madhya Pradesh Legislative Assembly election: Bhagwanpura
Party	Candidate	Votes	%	±%
INC	Kedar Chidabhai Dawar	99,043	49.8	+37.98
BJP	Chandar Singh Waskle	86,876	43.68	+6.03
Independent	Mohan Vishram Kirade	5,995	3.01	
NOTA	None of the above	2,806	1.41	−1.16
Majority		12,167	6.12	+0.41
Turnout		198,891	78.71	+2.15
INC gain from Independent		Swing		

=== 2018 ===
2018 Madhya Pradesh Legislative Assembly election: Bhagwanpura
Party	Candidate	Votes	%	±%
Independent	Kedar Chidabhai Dawar	73,758	43.36	
BJP	Jamna Singh Solanki	64,042	37.65	
INC	Vijay Singh Solanki	20,112	11.82	
CPI	Bhai Kiransingh Badole (Kiresh)	2,809	1.65	
BSP	Rakesh S/O Tukaram Chouhan	1,577	0.93	
NOTA	None of the above	4,371	2.57	
Majority		9,716	5.71	
Turnout		170,104	76.56	
Independent gain from INC		Swing		

== See also ==
- Bhagwanpura, Madhya Pradesh
- Khargone district
- List of constituencies of the Madhya Pradesh Legislative Assembly
