= Kasrawad Assembly constituency =

Constituency of the Madhya Pradesh legislative assembly in India

Coordinates: 22.12°N 75.61°E

Kasrawad
- Constituency No. 184 for the Madhya Pradesh Legislative Assembly

Constituency details
- Country: India
- Region: Central India
- State: Madhya Pradesh
- District: Khargone
- Lok Sabha constituency: Khargone
- Established: 1977
- Reservation: None

Member of Legislative Assembly
- 16th Madhya Pradesh Legislative Assembly
- Incumbent Sachin Yadav
- Party: Indian National Congress
- Elected year: 2023
- Preceded by: Atma Ram Patel

Kasrawad Assembly constituency is one of the 230 Vidhan Sabha (Legislative Assembly) constituencies of Madhya Pradesh state in central India.

It is part of Khargone district.

== Members of Legislative Assembly ==
Election	Name	Party
1977	Bankim Joshi	Janata Party
1980	Ramesh Chandra Mandloi	Indian National Congress (Indira)
1985	Ramesh Chandra Mandloi	Indian National Congress
1990	Gajanand Jinwala	Bharatiya Janata Party
1993	Subhash Yadav	Indian National Congress
1998	Subhash Yadav	Indian National Congress
2003	Subhash Yadav	Indian National Congress
2008	Atma Ram Patel	Bharatiya Janata Party
2013	Sachin Yadav	Indian National Congress
2018	Sachin Yadav	Indian National Congress
2023	Sachin Yadav	Indian National Congress

== Election results ==
=== 2023 ===
2023 Madhya Pradesh Legislative Assembly election: Kasrawad
Party	Candidate	Votes	%	±%
INC	Sachin Yadav	102,761	50.17	+1.1
BJP	Atmaram Patel	97,089	47.4	+1.49
NOTA	None of the above	1,656	0.81	−0.78
Majority		5,672	2.77	−0.39
Turnout		204,814	86.0	+2.58
INC hold		Swing		

=== 2018 ===
2018 Madhya Pradesh Legislative Assembly election: Kasrawad
Party	Candidate	Votes	%	±%
INC	Sachin Yadav	86,070	49.07	
BJP	Atmaram Patel	80,531	45.91	
Independent	Ajay Jagdish Patidar (Patel)	1,666	0.95	
BSP	Gajanand Sawner	1,659	0.95	
NOTA	None of the above	2,793	1.59	
Majority		5,539	3.16	
Turnout		175,403	83.42	
INC hold		Swing		

=== 2013 ===
2013 Madhya Pradesh Legislative Assembly election: Kasrawad
Party	Candidate	Votes	%	±%
INC	Sachin Yadav	79,685	50.21	
BJP	Atmaram Patel	67880	42.78	
Independent	Atmaram Patel	1908	1.20	N/A
BSP	Bhagawan Badole	1618	1.02	
CPI	Comrade Mangilal Nihal	1216	0.77	
Independent	Kamal Chouhan	1165	0.73	
Independent	Ravaram Mina	1059	0.67	
Independent	Parasram Yadav	585	0.37	
NOTA	None of the Above	3572	2.25	
Majority				
Turnout		158688	81.81	
INC gain from BJP		Swing		

== See also ==
- Kasrawad
