= Khargone Super Thermal Power Station =

Power station in Madhya Pradesh, India

- Official name: Khargone; Super Thermal Power Station
- Country: India
- Location: Selda, Khargone, Madhya Pradesh
- Coordinates: 22°3′25″N 75°50′38″E
- Status: Operational
- Commission date: 30 August 2019
- Operator: NTPC

Thermal power station
- Primary fuel: Coal

Power generation
- Units operational: 2
- Nameplate capacity: 1320 MW

Khargone Super Thermal Power Station is a coal-based thermal power project, located at village Selda and Dalchi in Khargone district in the Indian state of Madhya Pradesh. It is the country's first ultra super critical thermal power plant. The Khargone plant operates at an efficiency of 41.5 per cent, which is 3.3 per cent higher than the conventional super-critical ones, with steam parameters of 600 degree Celsius temperatures and 270 kg per centimeter square pressure.

The high efficiency results in less coal consumption for generating same amount of electricity with respect to super critical plants and will result in the reduction of 3.3 per cent carbon dioxide emissions.

Central Industrial Security Force guards this power station.

The project site is about 105 km from Indore, 50 km from Khargone ,35 km from Gogawa shahar, and 30 km from Sanawad town. The site is approachable from Sanawad on Indore – Khandwa State Highway through PWD road, from Bediya on Khargone - Sanawad road and another approachable from Makarkheda on Mhow - Khargone State Highway 01. The nearest railway station is Sanawad on Indore – Khandwa section is about 32 km.

== Installed capacity ==
Stage	Unit number	Capacity (MW)	Date of commissioning	Status	Make & model
1st	1	660	30 August 2019	Operational	L&T
1st	2	660	04 April 2020	Operational	L&T
