= Tarachand Patel =

Indian politician (1941–2023)

Member of Parliament, Lok Sabha
- In office 1999–2004
- Preceded by: Rameshwar Patidar
- Succeeded by: Krishna Murari Moghe
- Constituency: Khargone, Madhya Pradesh

Personal details
- Born: 20 October 1941
- Died: 18 September 2023 (aged 81) Sanawad
- Party: Indian National Congress
- Spouse: Aruna Patel

Tarachand Patel (20 October 1941 – 18 September 2023) was an Indian politician. He was elected to the Lok Sabha, the lower house of the Parliament of India, from Khargone in Madhya Pradesh as a member of the Indian National Congress (1999–2004).

Patel died on 18 September 2023, at the age of 81.
