= Surpala =

- Village
- Location in Madhya Pradesh, India
- Coordinates: 21.906°N 75.726°E
- Country: India
- State: Madhya Pradesh
- District: Khargone

Government
  - Sarpanch: Radhu Bhai

Population (2001)
  - Total: 1,200

Languages
  - Official: Hindi
- Time zone: UTC+5:30 (IST)
- Telephone code: 07280

Surpala is a village situated in Khargone District of Madhya Pradesh, India. Surpala belongs to Barwaha Tehsil and Khargone District. It is located in the area known as West Nimar.

== Economy ==
Economically this village is dependent on agriculture. It is known for production of cotton, papaya, wheat, soybean and chili. The main language spoken in the area is Nimari (a regional language, generally spoken in rural parts of Khargone District) and official work is done in Hindi.
