= Kedar Chidabhai Dawar =

Indian politician

Kedar Chidabhai Dawar (born 1964) is an Indian politician from Madhya Pradesh. He is a two time MLA from Bhagwanpura Assembly constituency, which is reserved for Scheduled Tribe community, in Khargone District. He won the 2023 Madhya Pradesh Legislative Assembly election, representing the Indian National Congress.

== Early life and education ==
Dawar is from Bhagwanpura, Khargone District, Madhya Pradesh. He is the son of late Chidabhai Dawar. He completed his L.L.B. in 1992 and B.A. in 1989 at Government College, Khargone, which is affiliated with Vikram University, Ujjain. His wife is in government service.

== Career ==
Dawar won from Bhagwanpura Assembly constituency in the 2023 Madhya Pradesh Legislative Assembly election representing the Indian National Congress. He polled 99,043 votes and defeated his nearest rival, Chandar Singh Waskle of the Bharatiya Janata Party, by a margin of 12,167 votes. He first became an MLA winning the 2018 Madhya Pradesh Legislative Assembly election from Bhagwanpura as an independent candidate. In 2018, he polled 73,758 votes and defeated his nearest rival, Jamnasingh Solanki of the Bharatiya Janata Party, by a margin of 9,716 votes.
