= Jawaharlal Institute of Technology, Borawan =

Indian college

Jawaharlal Institute of Technology
- Type: Private
- Established: 1997
- Founder: Subhash Yadav
- Affiliations: Rajiv Gandhi Proudyogiki Vishwavidyalaya
- Chairman: Arun Yadav
- Principal: Atul Upadhyay
- Dean: Sunil Sugandhi
- Location: Borawan, Madhya Pradesh, India; 22°02′03″N 75°39′51″E
- Campus: Rural
- Website: www.jitechno.com

Jawaharlal Institute of Technology (JIT) is an educational institute located in Borawan, Khargone district, Madhya Pradesh, India. The college have been approved by the All India Council for Technical Education, and is affiliated to Rajiv Gandhi Proudyogiki Vishwavidyalaya.

== History ==
Jawaharlal Institute of Technology was established by Subhash ji Yadav in the year of 1997. Under Jawaharlal Nehru Education and Charitable Trust in Borawan. The colleges offers 6 undergraduate and five postgraduate courses.

== Courses offered ==
Under Graduate Courses

- B.E. - Civil Engineering
- B.E. - Computer Science and Engineering
- B.E. - Electrical and Electronics Engineering
- B.E. - Electronics and Communication Engineering
- B.E. - Mechanical Engineering
- B.E. - Information Technology

Post Graduate Courses

- M.E. - Computer Science
- MCA - Master of Computer Applications
- M.E. - Transportation Engineering
- M.E. - Power Electronics
- M.E. - Industrial Engineering
