= Wijesinghe =

Wijesinghe is a Sinhalese name. and notable people with this name include:

Given name

- Wijesinghe Lokubandara (born 1941), Sri Lankan politician

Surname

- Athula Wijesinghe, former Chief Minister of North Western Province
- Chanaka Wijesinghe (born 1982), Sri Lankan cricketer
- Chandrasena Wijesinghe, Sri Lankan politician
- Gamini Wijesinghe, former Auditor General of Sri Lanka
- H. J. Wijesinghe, Ceylonese educationist
- Mallory Evan Wijesinghe (1918–2002), Sri Lankan engineer and entrepreneur
- Mellony Wijesinghe (2002–2019), Sri Lankan netball player
- Nimal Wijesinghe (born 1969), Sri Lankan politician
- Samara Wijesinghe (1943–2015), Sri Lanka engineer, author, poet and blogger
- Sarath Wijesinghe, Sri Lankan politician
- Sirimal Wijesinghe, Sri Lankan author, political analyst, film director, journalist, and alternative intellectual
- Tharinda Wijesinghe (born 1997), Sri Lankan cricketer
- Theodore Godfrey Wijesinghe Jayewardene (1872–1945), Ceylonese engineer
- Thilan Wijesinghe, Sri Lankan financier, entrepreneur, former cricketer and musician

== See also ==
- Wijesinha
