= Ramesh Patel =

Ramesh Patel may refer to:

- Ramesh Patel (field hockey)
- Ramesh Patel (politician)
