= Rajkumar Mev =

Indian politician

Rajkumar Mev (born 1969) is an Indian politician from Madhya Pradesh. He is an MLA from Maheshwar Assembly constituency, which is reserved for Scheduled Caste community, in Khargone district. He won the 2023 Madhya Pradesh Legislative Assembly election, representing the Bharatiya Janata Party.

== Early life and education ==
Mev is from Maheshwar, Khargone district, Madhya Pradesh. He is the son of Manohardas Mev. He passed Class 12 in 1993.

== Career ==
Mev won the Maheshwar Assembly constituency representing Bharatiya Janata Party in the 2023 Madhya Pradesh Legislative Assembly election. He polled 94,383 votes and defeated his nearest rival, Vijayalaxmi Sadho, by a margin of 5,919 votes. He first became an MLA winning the 2013 Madhya Pradesh Legislative Assembly election. In 2013, he polled 74,320 votes and defeated his nearest rival, Sunil Khande of the Indian National Congress, by a margin of 4,727 votes.
