= Subhash Yadav =

Indian politician (1946–2013)

Shri Subhash Gangaram Yadav
- श्री सुभाष गंगाराम यादव

3rd Deputy Chief Minister of Madhya Pradesh
- In office 14 Dec 1993 – 30 Nov 1998
- CM: Digvijaya Singh
- Succeeded by: Jamuna Devi

Member of the Madhya Pradesh Legislative Assembly
- In office 1993–2008
- Preceded by: Gajanand Jinwala
- Succeeded by: Atma Ram Patel
- Constituency: Kasrawad

Member of Parliament, Lok Sabha
- In office 1980–1989
- Preceded by: Rameshwar Patidar
- Succeeded by: Rameshwar Patidar
- Constituency: Khargone

Personal details
- Born: 1 April 1946 Borawan, Central Provinces and Berar, British India
- Died: 26 June 2013 (aged 67) New Delhi, India
- Party: Indian National Congress
- Spouse: Damiyanti Yadav
- Children: 6 (2 sons and 4 daughters)
- Parent: Gangaram Yadav (father)
- Education: Graduate in Agriculture
- Profession: Politician
- Website: http://iyadav.com/subhash-yadav/
- As of 17 June, 2018 Source: ["Biography" (PDF). Vidhan Sabha, Madhya Pradesh Legislative Assembly.]

Subhash Yadav (1 April 1946 – 26 June 2013) was an Indian politician. He was Madhya Pradesh MLA for Kasrawad (1993 to 2008).

== Political career ==
He was the Deputy Chief Minister of Madhya Pradesh during the 90s.

== See also ==
- 2008 Madhya Pradesh Legislative Assembly election
- 2003 Madhya Pradesh Legislative Assembly election
- 1998 Madhya Pradesh Legislative Assembly election
- 1993 Madhya Pradesh Legislative Assembly election
