= Maheshwar Assembly constituency =

Constituency of the Madhya Pradesh legislative assembly in India

Coordinates: 22.18°N 75.58°E

Maheshwar
- Constituency No. 183 for the Madhya Pradesh Legislative Assembly

Constituency details
- Country: India
- Region: Central India
- State: Madhya Pradesh
- District: Khargone
- Lok Sabha constituency: Khargone
- Established: 1957
- Reservation: SC

Member of Legislative Assembly
- 16th Madhya Pradesh Legislative Assembly
- Incumbent Rajkumar Mev
- Party: Bharatiya Janata Party
- Elected year: 2023
- Preceded by: Vijayalaxmi Sadho

Maheshwar is one of the 230 Vidhan Sabha (Legislative Assembly) constituencies of Madhya Pradesh state in central India. BJP leader Rajkumar Mev represents the constituency in the Madhya Pradesh Vidhan Sabha.

It is part of Khargone district.

== Members of the Legislative Assembly ==
Year	Member	Party
1957	Ballabhdas Sitaram	Indian National Congress
1962-1967: Constituency did not exist
1967	Sitaram Sadhuram	Indian National Congress
1972	Sitaram Sadhuram	Indian National Congress
1977	Nathubhai Sawale	Janata Party
1980	Sitaram Sadho	Indian National Congress
1985	Vijayalaxmi Sadho	Indian National Congress
1990	Madan Verma	Bharatiya Janata Party
1993	Vijayalaxmi Sadho	Indian National Congress
1998	Vijayalaxmi Sadho	Indian National Congress
2003	Bhupendra Arya	Bharatiya Janata Party
2008	Vijayalaxmi Sadho	Indian National Congress
2013	Rajkumar Mev	Bharatiya Janata Party
2018	Vijayalaxmi Sadho	Indian National Congress
2023	Rajkumar Mev	Bharatiya Janata Party

== Election results ==
=== 2023 ===
2023 Madhya Pradesh Legislative Assembly election: Maheshwar
Party	Candidate	Votes	%	±%
BJP	Rajkumar Mev	94,383	50.25	+31.0
INC	Vijayalaxmi Sadho	88,464	47.1	−1.95
NOTA	None of the above	1,667	0.89	−0.11
Majority		5,919	3.15	−18.01
Turnout		187,839	82.82	+1.54
BJP gain from INC		Swing		

=== 2018 ===
2018 Madhya Pradesh Legislative Assembly election: Maheshwar
Party	Candidate	Votes	%	±%
INC	Vijayalaxmi Sadho	83,087	49.05	
Independent	Mev Rajkumar	47,251	27.89	
BJP	Bhupendra Arya	32,601	19.25	
NOTA	None of the above	1,689	1.0	
Majority		35,836	21.16	
Turnout		169,395	81.28	
INC gain from		Swing		

== See also ==
- Maheshwar
