= Ramchandra Bade =

Indian politician

Member of Parliament, Lok Sabha
- In office 1971–1977
- Preceded by: Shashi Bhushan
- Succeeded by: Rameshwar Patidar
- In office 1962–1967
- Succeeded by: Shashi Bhushan
- Constituency: Khargone, Madhya Pradesh

Personal details
- Born: 8 March 1905 Indore
- Died: Sendhwa
- Party: Bharatiya Jana Sangh
- Spouse: Sarala Bade
- Children: 2 daughters Late Mrs. Nalani Agarwal Pramodini Phatak

Ramchandra Bade was an Indian politician from the state of Madhya Pradesh belonging to the Bharatiya Janata Party (earlier Bharatiya Jana Sangh).

He was elected to the legislative assembly of Madhya Bharat (now Madhya Pradesh), as well as Lok Sabha, the lower house of the Parliament of India, from Khargone.
