= Segaon, Madhya Pradesh =

Segaon
- village
- Location in Madhya Pradesh, India
- Coordinates: 21.858°N 75.329°E
- Country: India
- State: Madhya Pradesh
- District: Khargone

Languages
  - Official: Hindi
- Time zone: UTC+5:30 (IST)
- ISO 3166 code: MP-IN

Segaon, Madhya Pradesh is a village & Tehsil in Khargone district in the Indian state of Madhya Pradesh.

== Geography ==
Segaon is located in the Narmada Valley on MP SH 26, at 21.85°N 75.32°E. It has an average elevation of 285 m (935 ft). Situated in western area of Khargone district, Segaon lies 33 km (21 mi) from Khargone. It is a Tehsil of Khargone district. Segaon is generally famous for the temple shri lalbai phoolbai mata mandir. Segaon is a very old town. Ram mandir gali is situated in the middle of this town. Segaon can be considered a dry and arid region for farming where crops that are usually grown are corn, cotton and soyabean.
