= Jhirnya, Madhya Pradesh =

Jhirnya
- village
- Location in Madhya Pradesh, India
- Coordinates: 21.65°N 75.99°E
- Country: India
- State: Madhya Pradesh
- District: Khargone

Languages
  - Official: Hindi
- Time zone: UTC+5:30 (IST)
- ISO 3166 code: MP-IN

Jhirnya, Madhya Pradesh is a village & tehsil in Khargone district in the Indian state of Madhya Pradesh.

== Geography ==
Jhirnya is located in the Narmada Valley on MP SH 4, at 21.65°N 75.99°E. Situated in south-eastern area of Khargone district, Jhirnya lies 45 km (28 mi) from Khargone. It is a Tehsil of Khargone district.
