= Balkrishan Patidar =

Indian politician

Balkrishan Patidar (born 1953) is an Indian politician from Madhya Pradesh. He is an MLA from Khargone Assembly constituency in Khargone District. He won the 2023 Madhya Pradesh Legislative Assembly election, representing the Bharatiya Janata Party.

== Early life and education ==
Patidar is from Khargone, Madhya Pradesh. He is the son of Bao Patidar. He passed Class 10 in 1968.

== Career ==
Patidar won from Khargone Assembly constituency in the 2023 Madhya Pradesh Legislative Assembly election representing the Bharatiya Janata Party. He polled 101,683 votes and defeated his nearest rival, Ravi Joshi of the Indian National Congress, by a margin of 13,765 votes. He was first elected as an MLA winning the 2013 Madhya Pradesh Legislative Assembly election defeating his nearest rival, by a margin of votes. Later, he lost the 2018 Madhya Pradesh Legislative Assembly election, by a margin of votes.
