= Gajendra Patel =

Indian politician

Gajendra Singh Patel

National General Secretary of Bharatiya Janata Party
- Incumbent
- Assumed office 17 August 2026
- President: Nitin Nabin

Member of Parliament, Lok Sabha
- Incumbent
- Assumed office 23 May 2019
- Preceded by: Subhash Patel
- Constituency: Khargone

Personal details
- Born: 16 February 1975 (age 51) Barwani, Madhya Pradesh
- Party: Bharatiya Janata Party
- Spouse: Basanti Patel
- Parents: Umrao Singh Patel (father); Late Sushila Bai Patel (mother)
- Education: BA; LL.B.
- Alma mater: Government College, Barwani; Indore Christian College
- Profession: Businessperson farmer

Gajendra Singh Patel (born 16 February 1975; Hindi pronunciation: [gəd͡ʒeːn̪d̪ɾə sɪŋgʱ pəʈeːl]) is an Indian politician. He was elected to the Lok Sabha, lower house of the Parliament of India from Khargone, Madhya Pradesh in the 2019 Indian general election as member of the Bharatiya Janata Party.
