= Indirasagar Dam =

Indira Sagar Dam
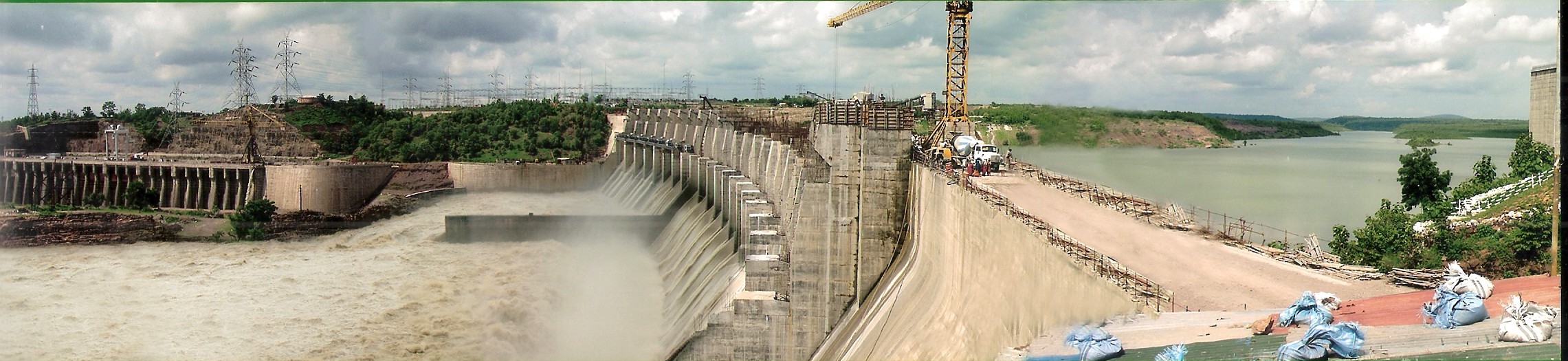
- Interactive map of Indira Sagar Dam
- Location: Narmada Nagar Village, Punasa Tehsil, Khandwa district, Madhya Pradesh, India
- Coordinates: 22°17′02″N 76°28′17″E
- Status: Operational
- Construction began: 23 October 1984
- Opening date: 31 May 2005
- Owner: Government of Madhya Pradesh
- Operators: Narmada Hydroelectric Development Corporation (NHDC) (Joint Venture of NHPC and Government of Madhya Pradesh)

Dam and spillways
- Type of dam: Concrete Gravity dam with a slightly curved alignment
- Impounds: Narmada River
- Height: 92 m (302 ft)
- Length: 653 m (2,142 ft)
- Spillways: 20 (Chute spillway (auxiliary) – 8 : 20 m x 17 m, Main (service) Spillway – 12 : 20 m x 17 m)
- Spillway type: Ogee
- Spillway capacity: 83,400 m^{3}/s (2,950,000 cu ft/s)

Reservoir
- Creates: Indira Sagar Reservoir
- Total capacity: 12.220 km^{3} (9,907,000 acre⋅ft) (432 Tmcft)
- Active capacity: 9.750 km^{3} (7,904,000 acre⋅ft) (344.37 tmcft)
- Inactive capacity: 2.470 km^{3} (2,002,000 acre⋅ft)
- Catchment area: 61,642 km^{2} (23,800 sq mi)
- Surface area: 913.48 km^{2} (352.70 sq mi)

Power Station
- Operator: NHDC
- Turbines: Dam: 8 × 125 MW Francis pump-turbine Canal: 15 MW Kaplan-type
- Installed capacity: 1,000 MW
- Annual generation: 2,700 GWh annually (9.7PJ)
- Website nhdcindia.com/Site/frmProjectDetails.aspx?PID=1%2F

The Indira Sagar Dam is the largest dam in India, in terms of volume of water stored in the reservoir. It is located on the Narmada River at the town of Narmada Nagar, Punasa in the Khandwa district of Madhya Pradesh in India. The foundation stone of the project was laid by the prime minister of India Indira Gandhi on 23 October 1984. The construction of the main dam started in 1992. The downstream projects of ISP are Omkareshwar, Maheshwar, and Sardar Sarovar Project. To build it, a town of 22,000 people and 100 villages were displaced.

The Project involved construction of a 92 m high and 653 m long concrete gravity dam. It provides irrigation to 1,230 square kilometres of land with annual production of 2.7 billion units in the districts of Khandwa and Khargone in Madhya Pradesh, and power generation of 1,000 MW (8x125 MW) installed capacity. In terms of storage of water, it is the largest reservoir in India, with capacity of 12.22 billion cu m or 12.2 km^{3}, followed by Rihand Dam, Uttar Pradesh then Nagarjuna Sagar between Telangana and Andhra Pradesh. The dam was built as a joint venture between Madhya Pradesh irrigation and National Hydroelectric Power Corporation. It was commissioned on May 31st 2005.

== Indira Sagar Project ==
River Narmada, the fifth largest river in India, with a river flow length of 1,312 km, originates from Amarkantak in Anuppur district of Madhya Pradesh. Narmada flows southwestward and after passing through Madhya Pradesh, Gujarat, and a small stretch in Maharashtra, it drains into the Arabian Sea near the Gulf of Khambhat. Indira Sagar Project (ISP) situated on River Narmada, 12 km from Punasa in Khandwa district of Madhya Pradesh, has been commissioned on 31 March 2005.

Indira Sagar Project is a multipurpose Project with an installed capacity of 1,000 MW, with annual energy generation of 2,698 million units in Stage I, 1,850 million units in Stage II, and 1,515 million units in Stage III, and annual irrigation of 2.65 Lac. Ha on a Culturable Command Area (CCA) of 1.23 Lac. Ha. Total catchment area at the dam site is 61,642 km^{2}. The regulated discharge from Indira Sagar Dam under mother Indira Sagar Projectwill enable Power generation at downstream projects of Omkareshwar and Maheshwar projects and irrigation from the Omkareshwar project and will also provide supplies to the Sardar Sarovar Project as directed by the Narmada Water Disputes Tribunal. This project on Narmada Basin with the largest reservoir in India, having 12.22 b m3 storage capacity. All the eight units commissioned by March 2005 ahead of schedule while generation from first unit was started from January 2004. The powerhouse is the second-largest surface powerhouse in India.

== See also ==
- List of power stations in India
- Nagarjuna Sagar
- Tehri Dam
- Hirakud Dam
