= Raibidpura =

Village in Madhya Pradesh, India

Raibidpura is a large village in the Nimar region of Madhya Pradesh, India. Located about 25 km from Khargone city, it is famed for the huge popularity of contract bridge among its populace.
