= Rajan Mandloi =

Indian politician

Rajan Mandloi (born 1973) is an Indian politician from Madhya Pradesh. He is an MLA from Barwani Assembly constituency, which is reserved for Scheduled Tribe community, in Barwani District. He won the 2023 Madhya Pradesh Legislative Assembly election, representing the Indian National Congress.

== Early life and education ==
Mandloi is from Barwani, Madhya Pradesh. He is the son of Haresingh. He completed his M.B.A. in 2015 at Institute of Management Studies, Indore which is affiliated with Ahilya Vishwavidyalaya. Earlier, he did his M.A. in political science in 2006 at Devi Ahilya Vishwavidyalaya. His wife is in government service.

== Career ==
Mandloi won from Barwani Assembly constituency in the 2023 Madhya Pradesh Legislative Assembly election representing the Indian National Congress. He polled 101,197 votes and defeated his nearest rival, Premsingh Patel of the Bharatiya Janata Party, by a margin of 11,172 votes. He lost the 2018 Madhya Pradesh Legislative Assembly election as an independent politician to Premsingh Patel of the Bharatiya Janata Party by a margin of 38,787 votes.
