= Vijay Singh Solanki =

Indian politician

Jamna Singh Solanki

Member of the Madhya Pradesh Legislative Assembly
- In office 2013–2013
- Preceded by: Dalsingh Solanki
- Succeeded by: Vijay Singh Solanki
- Constituency: Bhagwanpura

Personal details
- Born: 13 january Village Dhulkot, Khargone
- Party: Bhartiya Janata Party
- Education: 8th pass
- Profession: Politician
- As of 11 July, 2018 Source: ["Biography:Solanki, Vijay Singh" (PDF). Madhya Pradesh Legislative Assembly.]

Jamna Singh Solanki is an Indian politician and a member of the Bhartiya Janata Party. He was the firebrand and active member of RSS and VHP.

== Political career ==
He became an MLA in 2013 Madhya Pradesh Legislative Assembly election.

== Personal life ==
He is married to Mrs. Ushabai and has two sons.

== See also ==
- Madhya Pradesh Legislative Assembly
- 2013 Madhya Pradesh Legislative Assembly election
