= Subhash Patel =

Indian politician

Member of Parliament of Lok Sabha for Khargone
- In office 2014–2019
- Preceded by: Makhansingh Solanki

Personal details
- Born: 25 April 1978 (age 47) Barwani, Madhya Pradesh
- Party: Bhartiya Janata Party
- Spouse: Mamata Patel
- Parent(s): Uday Singh, Leela Bai

Subhash Patel (born 25 April 1978; Hindi pronunciation: [sʊbʱaːʃ pəʈeːl]) is an Indian politician and a member of the Bharatiya Janata Party. He served as Member of parliament, Lok Sabha from the Khargone (Lok Sabha constituency).
