= Vijayalaxmi Sadho =

Indian politician and social worker

Dr Vijaylaxmi Sadho
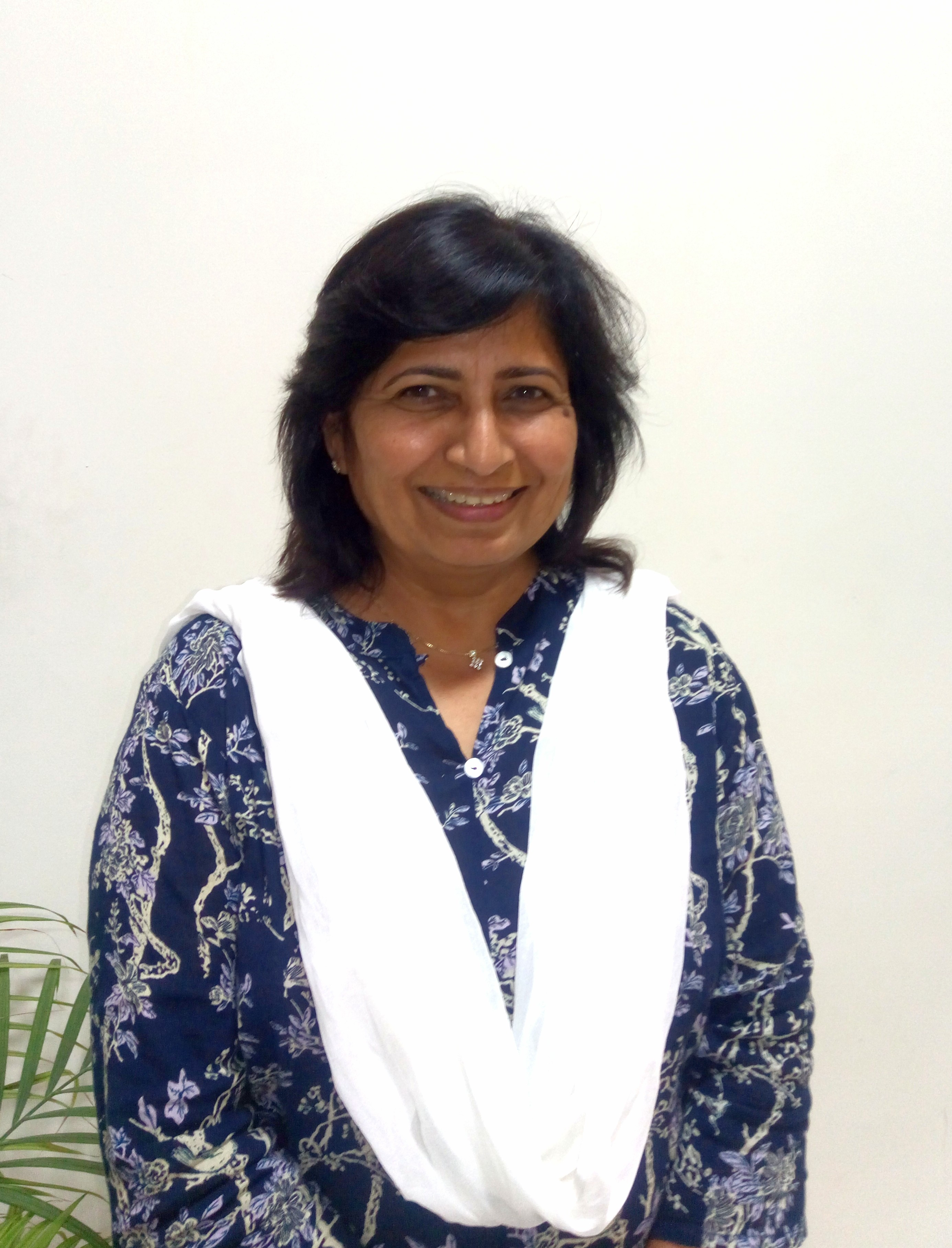

Member of Legislative Assembly, Madhya Pradesh
- Incumbent
- Assumed office 11 December 2018
- Preceded by: Rajkumar Mev
- Constituency: Maheshwar

Minister of Culture, Medical Education & AYUSH, Madhya Pradesh Government
- In office 25 December 2018 – April 2020
- Chief Minister: Shivraj Singh Chouhan
- Succeeded by: Usha Thakur, Vishvas Sarang

Member of Parliament, Rajya Sabha
- In office 30 June 2010 – 29 June 2016
- Succeeded by: Vivek Tankha
- Constituency: Madhya Pradesh

Personal details
- Born: 13 November 1955 (age 70) Mandleshwar, Madhya Bharat, India
- Party: Indian National Congress
- Education: Gandhi Medical College, Bhopal
- Profession: Social worker, politician

Dr Vijaylaxmi Sadho (born 13 November 1955) is an Indian social worker, politician and a former member of parliament (Rajya Sabha) elected from Madhya Pradesh, being an Indian National Congress candidate. Sadho represents Maheshwar in the Madhya Pradesh Vidhan Sabha. She took oath as a cabinet minister of new MP government on 25 December 2018.

== Early life and education ==
Sadho was born on 13 November 1955 in Mandleshwar in Khargone district in the Indian state of Madhya Pradesh. She is a graduate of Gandhi Medical College, Bhopal in M.B.B.S.

== Career ==
Sadho was General secretary of Indian Youth Congress, Madhya Pradesh from 1985 to 1992. She served as a member of Madhya Pradesh Legislative Assembly from 1985 to 1989. She has been a member of Public Accounts Committee, Committee on Women and Child Welfare and Committee on the Welfare for SC, ST and Other Backward Classes. From 1989 to 1990, she served as a parliamentary secretary. She was a member of Department of Public Health and Family Welfare and Department of Jails, Govt. of Madhya Pradesh from 1993 to 1998. From 1985 to 2018 she got elected to the MP Legislative assembly for 5 terms. She lost the elections in 1990 and 2003. In 2013 she didn't contest the elections as se got elected to Rajya Sabha.

She was elected to Rajya Sabha in April 2010. She served as a member of Committee on Health and Family Welfare, Select Committee to the Prevention of Torture Bill, Committee on Papers Laid on the Table Member, Consultative Committee for the Ministry of Rural Development, Committee on Health and Family Welfare and Central Supervisory Board.
