= Barwani Assembly constituency =

Constituency of the Madhya Pradesh legislative assembly in India

Coordinates: 22.04°N 74.90°E

Badwani
- Constituency No. 190 for the Madhya Pradesh Legislative Assembly

Constituency details
- Country: India
- Region: Central India
- State: Madhya Pradesh
- District: Barwani
- Lok Sabha constituency: Khargone
- Established: 1951
- Total electors: 2,75,325
- Reservation: ST

Member of Legislative Assembly
- 16th Madhya Pradesh Legislative Assembly
- Incumbent Rajan Mandloi
- Party: Indian National Congress
- Elected year: 2023
- Preceded by: Premsingh Patel

Barwani is one of eight assembly constituencies in the Khargone Lok Sabha constituency. It is reserved for the candidates belonging to the Scheduled Tribes. As of 2023, the constituency is represented by Rajan Mandloi of the Indian National Congress who won the 2023 Madhya Pradesh Legislative Assembly election.

== Members of the Legislative Assembly ==
Election	Member	Party
1952	Partap Singh	Bharatiya Jana Sangh
1957	Gulal	Bharatiya Jana Sangh
1962	Daval Nana	Bharatiya Jana Sangh
1967	Daval Nana	Bharatiya Jana Sangh
1972	Umrao Singh Parvat Singh	Bharatiya Jana Sangh
1977	Umrao Singh Parvat Singh	Janata Party
1980	Umraosingh Phatla	Indian National Congress
1985	Umraosingh Phatla	Indian National Congress
1990	Umrao Singh Parvat Singh	Bharatiya Janata Party
1993	Premsingh Patel	Bharatiya Janata Party
1998	Premsingh Patel	Bharatiya Janata Party
2003	Premsingh Patel	Bharatiya Janata Party
2008	Premsingh Patel	Bharatiya Janata Party
2013	Ramesh Patel	Indian National Congress
2018	Premsingh Patel	Bharatiya Janata Party
2023	Rajan Mandloi	Indian National Congress

== Election results ==
Vote share of Winning candidates
2023	50.28%
2018	48.14%
2013	46.17%
2008	46.08%
2003	51.68%

=== 2023 ===
M. P. Legislative Assembly election, 2023: Barwani
Party	Candidate	Votes	%	±%
INC	Rajan Mandloi	101,197	50.28	▲31.67
BJP	Premsingh Patel	90,025	44.73	▼3.41
BAP	Deepak Devisingh Sengar	2,206	1.1	
Independent	Sandeep Nargave	2,190	1.09	
NOTA	None of the above	3,717	1.85	▼0.67
Majority		11,172	5.55	▼15.63
Turnout		201,271	73.1	▼4.6
INC gain from BJP		Swing		

=== 2018 ===
M. P. Legislative Assembly election, 2018: Barwani
Party	Candidate	Votes	%	±%
BJP	Premsingh Patel	88,151	48.14	
Independent	Rajan Mandloi	49,364	26.96	
INC	Ramesh Patel	34,084	18.61	
BSP	Sumer Singh Badole	1,928	1.05	
Independent	Rana Durgeshsingh	1,839	1.0	
Independent	Sanjay Mandloi	1,756	0.96	
NOTA	None of the above	4,611	2.52	
Majority		38,787	21.18	
Turnout		183,104	77.7	
BJP gain from INC		Swing		

=== 2013 ===
M. P. Legislative Assembly election, 2013: Barwani
Party	Candidate	Votes	%	±%
INC	Ramesh Patel	77,761	46.17	13.1▲
BJP	Premsingh Patel	67,234	39.92	6.16▼
BSP	Kansingh Patel Nahala	5,133	3.05	0.37▲
Independent	Shantilal Holgaon	5,017	2.98	N/A
SAMSP	Karan Burman	3,557	2.11	New
SP	Gulsingh Pema	2,279	1.35	0.02▼
NOTA	None of the Above	7,430	4.41	New
Majority		10,527	6.25	6.76▼
Turnout		1,68,411	75.42	1.47▲
Registered electors		2,23,297		
INC gain from BJP		Swing		

=== 2008 ===
M. P. Legislative Assembly election, 2008: Barwani
Party	Candidate	Votes	%	±%
BJP	Premsingh Patel	50,759	46.08	5.60▼
INC	Engr. Rajan Haresingh Mandloi	36,432	33.07	2.12▼
Independent	Laxman Singh Chouhan	15,880	14.42	N/A
BSP	Bhuvata Barde	2,952	2.68	0.75▲
Independent	Ajay Singh Awasya	2,625	2.38	N/A
SP	Ramesh Chouhan	1,513	1.37	5.67▼
Majority		14,327	13.01	3.48▼
Turnout		1,10,161	73.95	3.31▲
Registered electors		1,48,968		
BJP hold		Swing		

=== 2003 ===
M. P. Legislative Assembly election, 2003: Barwani
Party	Candidate	Votes	%	±%
BJP	Premsingh Patel	55,924	51.68	
INC	Tersingh Patel	38,080	35.19	
SP	Ramesh Chouhan	7,623	7.04	
NCP	Umraosingh Fatla	6,583	6.08	
Majority		17,844	16.49	
Turnout		1,08,210	70.64	
Registered electors		1,53,178		
BJP hold		Swing		

== See also ==
- Barwani
