= Vijay Singh (activist) =

Indian anti-corruption activist

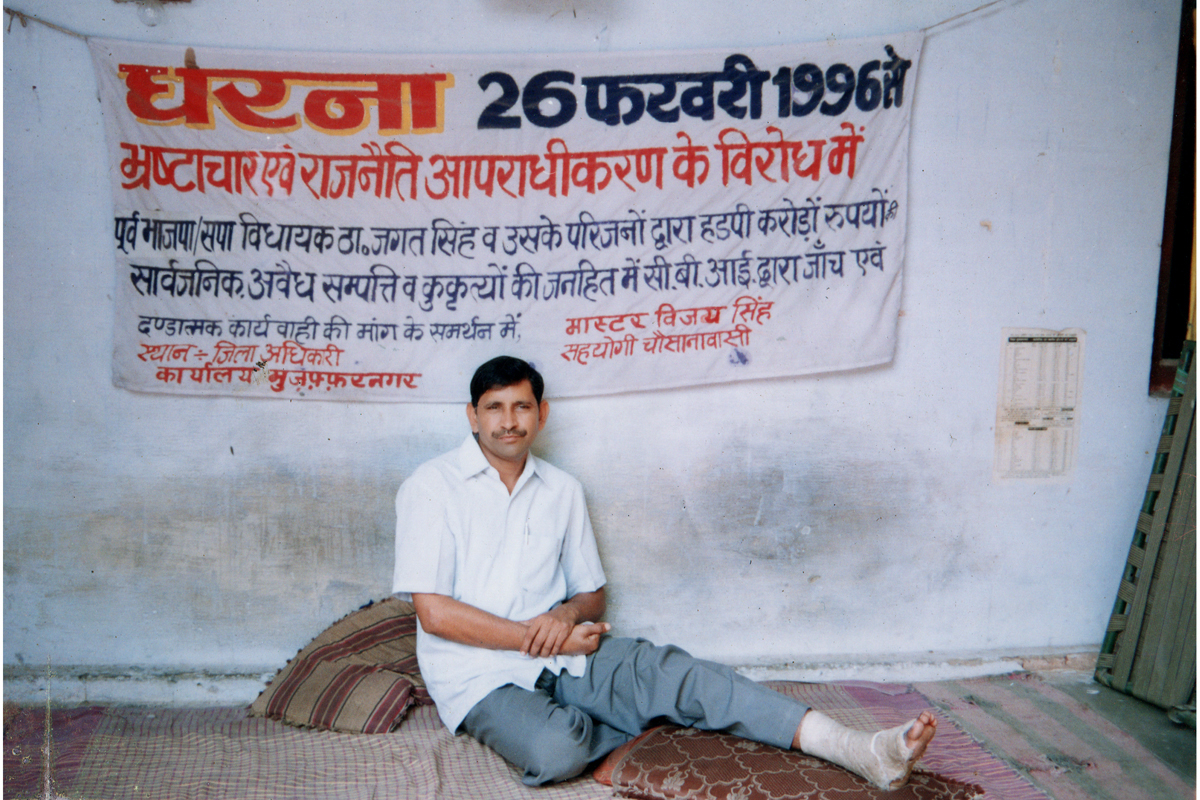
- Vijay Singh in the early days of his protest
- Born: 10 May 1962 (age 64); Village Chausana, India
- Other name: Master ji
- Occupation: Activist
- Years active: Since 26 February 1996
- Known for: Longest agitation in India
- Notable work: Raised voice against land mafias

Vijay Singh (born 10 May 1962) is an anti-corruption activist in Muzaffarnagar District, Uttar Pradesh, India. He has been carrying out a dharna (non-violent protest) against illegal possession of public land by private actors since February 1996. His action has been recorded as the longest such protest in various books of records including the Limca Book of Records. He has now completed 30 years of agitation on 26 February 2026. This agitation is recorded as the longest protest by Google. Before this, the world's first longest strike was that of Willium Thomas in front of White House.

== Anti-corruption activism ==
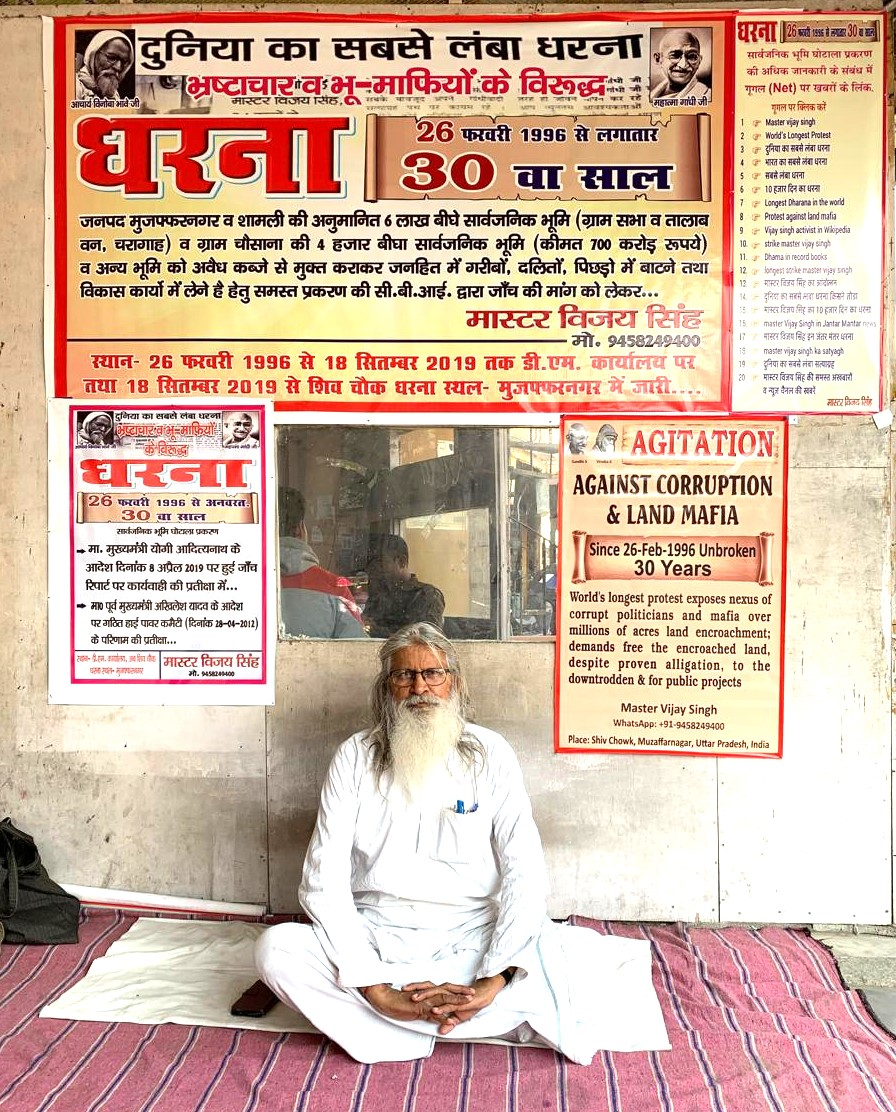
Completion of 30 years of agitation

Singh was spurred to action when he saw a hungry child, who was crying for bread and asking his mother to bring flour from a neighbour. He started conducting research on land ownership in his village, and found that four thousand bighas of village assembly land was illegally occupied by private individuals. Singh resigned from his post of teacher in order to carry on his work against the illegal occupation.

Singh submitted a memorandum to the administration, and in 1995, the government handed over the investigation to the Division Commissioner. Under his leadership, a team of officials began an investigation into the matter, and found the charges of illegal possession to be true. However, no action against the people involved was taken, and Singh started his protest in front of the District Magistrate office in Muzaffarnagar on 26 February 1996, with the demand to free the land for the poor so that it could be used for public development.

== Achievements by the movement ==
In 2008, when the erstwhile Principal Secretary Home JN Chamber was briefed on the matter, he ordered the local administration to take action in this regard. The administration team led by District Magistrate R Ramesh Kumar visited the village and freed 300 bighas of illegally encroached land. In this case, 136 cases were filed against those who had been encroaching. 3200 bighas of land encroachments in the investigation have been proved as of now.

Other than this, in Muzaffarnagar district, there were 1250 bighas public land in the Purquazi area and 50000 bighas in Ramraj and Bhopa area also freed from illegal possession. There is six revenue employees are in jail for involvement.

== Walk to Lucknow ==
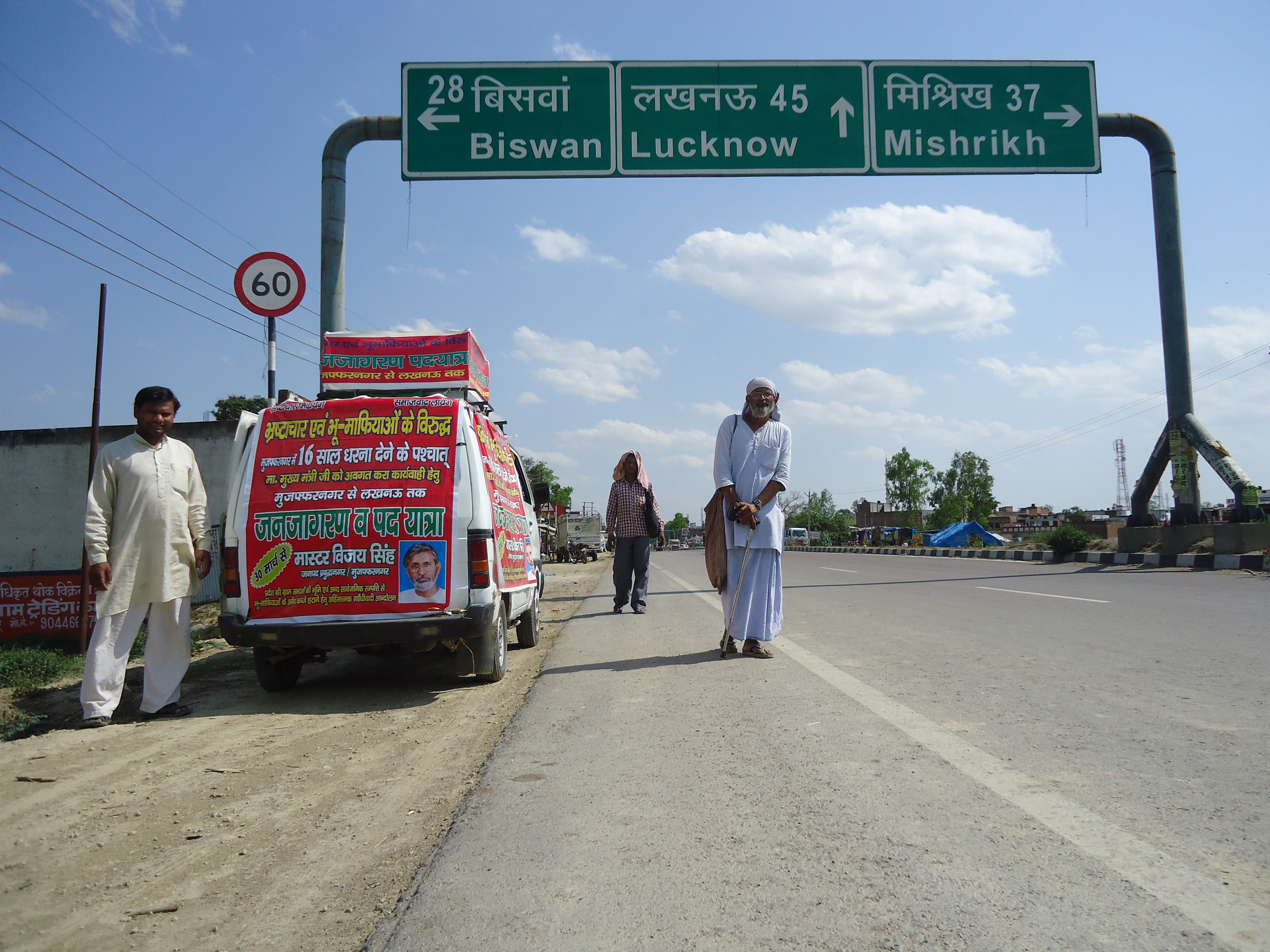
Midway to Lucknow

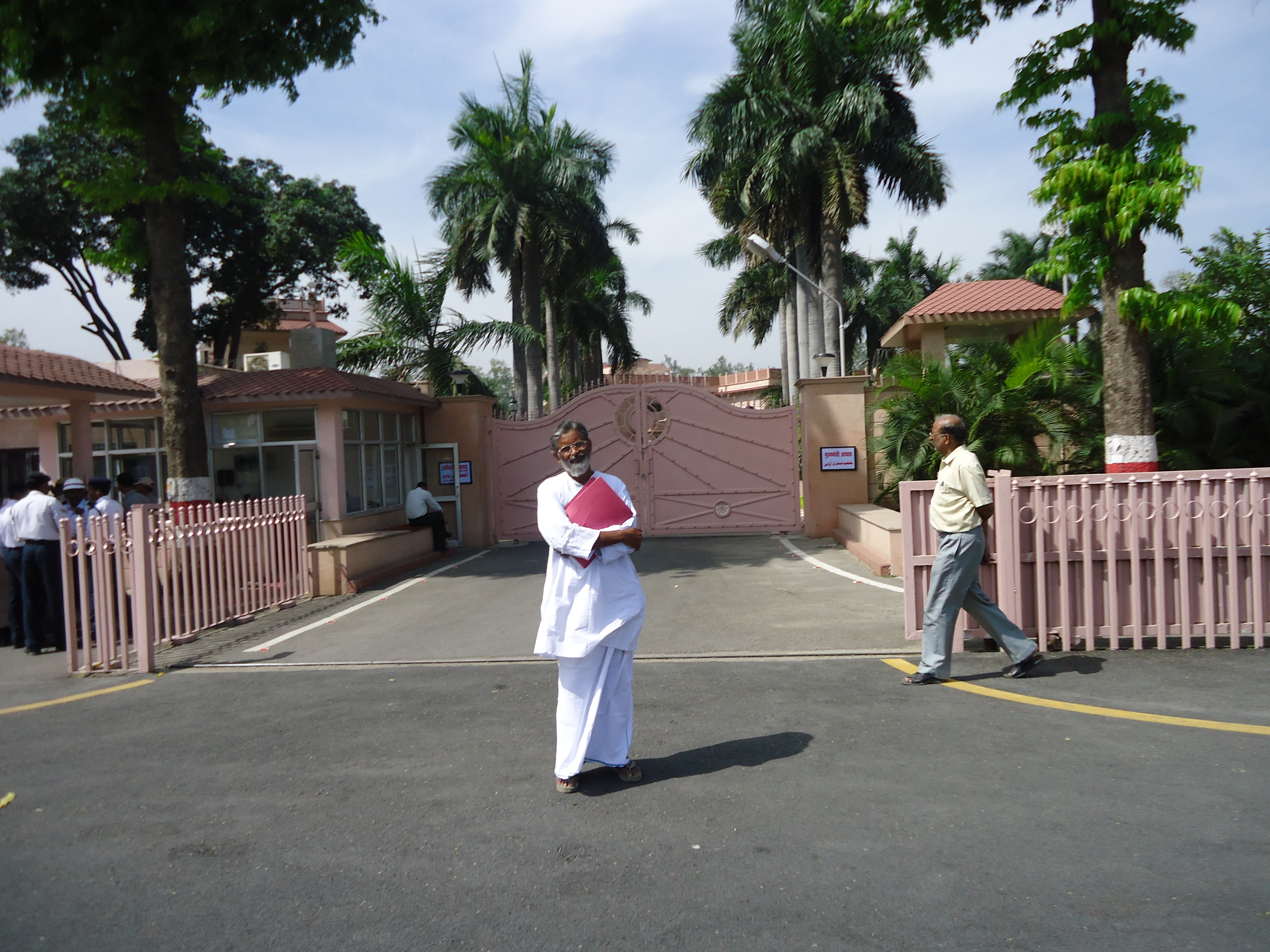
Vijay Singh at CM residence after meeting

On 30 March 2012, Singh started a foot march from Muzaffarnagar to Lucknow, the capital of Uttar Pradesh. He walked the 600 kilometers in 19 days. The objective was to meet State CM Akhilesh Yadav and raise public awareness of illegal encroachment onto public land.
