= Gogawan =

Gogawan गोगावा
- Village
- Location in Madhya Pradesh, India
- Coordinates: 21.91°N 75.7°E
- Country: India
- State: Madhya Pradesh
- District: Khargone

Population (2011)
  - Total: 18,000

Languages
  - Official: Hindi
  - Regional: Hindi and Nimadi dialect of Hindi
- Time zone: UTC+5:30 (IST)
- Postal code: 451335
- Telephone code: 07287

Gogawan is a village in Khargone district in the state of Madhya Pradesh, India. This village is situated on the banks of the Weda River. Gogawan had a population of 18,000. The town is surrounded by hundreds of very small villages and so is the main market area for those villages. On every Tuesday people from all these villages come to purchase their weekly required materials, whereas on Sunday most of the shops remain closed.

== Demographics ==
As of the 2011 Census of India, males constitute 50.86% of the population, females average 49.14%. Gogawan has an average literacy rate of 78.83%. This is higher than the national average of 74.04%: male literacy is 85.91%, and female literacy is 71.63%.

Religion in Gogawan
Religion	Percent
Hindus	53.31%
Muslims	46.56%
Others†	0.13%
Distribution of religions †Includes Sikhs (0.02%)

== Education ==
Gogawan does not have any colleges but there are some schools in town.

=== Higher secondary schools ===
- Government Boys Higher Secondary School
- Government Girls Higher Secondary School

=== High schools ===
- Bapna Public School, Gogawa

=== Other schools ===
- The First Step Public School
- Shanti Shiksha Niketan School
- Devanshu Public School
- Nizamiya Public School
- Sandipani Public School
- St. Umar Convent School
- Gurukul Public School
- Priyadarshini Public School
- Sanjari public school (Director- Mohammad idris
- Shyamlu makoda Public School (Director - harraam idris, Principal - Talya lee)
- Gotya public school, Deven pura (Director - Ongesh, Principal - Uski fanti)

== Villages in Gogawan block ==
- Mahammadpur
- Khedi Khurd
- Jamanya
- Jagannathpura
- Hirapur [temarni]
- Gowadi
- Gopalpura
- Gogawa
- Ghughariyakhedi
- Ghatti
- Devali
- Dayalpura
- Dawalgaon
- Dasnawal
- Bistan
- Bilkhed
- Bilali
- Behrampur
- Beed
- Balgaon
- Baijapura

khedi Khurd

- Badgaon
