= Samara Wijesinghe =

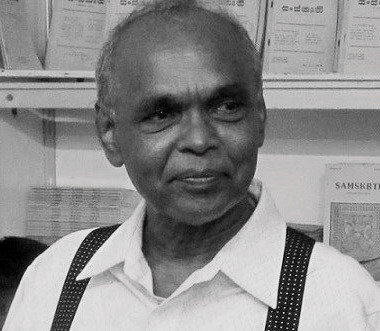
- Samara Wijesinghe
- Occupations: Mechanical engineer, writer, poet, blogger.

Samara Wijesinghe (21 August 1943 – 4 September 2015) was a Sri Lanka engineer, author, poet and blogger.

== Biography ==
Wijesinghelage Samarasena Wijesinghe was born in Kegalle, Sri Lanka. He completed his education at Government Science College, Matale and embarked on his first job as a mechanical engineer at the National Steel Corporation. He later moved to Lanka Walltiles PLC before embarking on his own plywood production house.

=== Publications ===
Samara was a prolific poet in Sinhalese with many publications in both print and electronic media to his name. A short summary includes the following:

- චූල ගායිකාව (short stories) 2003
- ගෝත්‍රිකාව (short stories) 2004
- නොසිදුවීම් කීපයක් (short stories) 2005
- එක කවිය සිය වරක් (poetry) 2009
- සේදී ගිය පාට (short stories)2009
- සද්ධර්ම කතා- සද්ධර්මරත්නාවලියේ එන කෙටිකතා කීපයක් (short stories - Retold stories from Saddharma Rathanawaliya) 2010

=== Presence in Electronic Media ===
Wijesinghe maintained a blog titled 'නොසිදුවීම් කීපයක්' (Non-Events). The collected short stories from this were subsequently published as a book by the same name. He was a vocal presence in the Sinhalese blog-sphere, encouraging other bloggers to write and publish their work. As the first collection of online writings he led the popular Sinhalese website Boondi.lk to publish Boondi Akshara Senaga (බූන්දි අක්ෂර සෙනග).
