= Borawan =

- village
- Location in Madhya Pradesh, India
- Coordinates: 22.03°N 75.66°E
- Country: India
- State: Madhya Pradesh
- District: Khargone

Languages
  - Official: Hindi
- Time zone: UTC+5:30 (IST)

Borawan is a village in Khargone district in the Indian state of Madhya Pradesh.

== Geography ==
Borawan is located in the Narmada Valley, at 22.03°N 75.66°E. Situated on the Veda River, Borawan lies 15 km from Kasrawad. It falls under Kasrawad Tehsil of Khargone district.
