= Makhansingh Solanki =

Indian politician (born 1952)

Makhansingh Solanki (born 1 March 1952) is an Indian politician, belonging to Bhartiya Janata Party. In the 2009 election, he was elected to the 15th Lok Sabha from the Khargone Lok Sabha constituency of Madhya Pradesh.

Born in the Barwani District, he is a political and social worker. He resides at Badwani.
