= Shashi Bhushan =

Indian politician

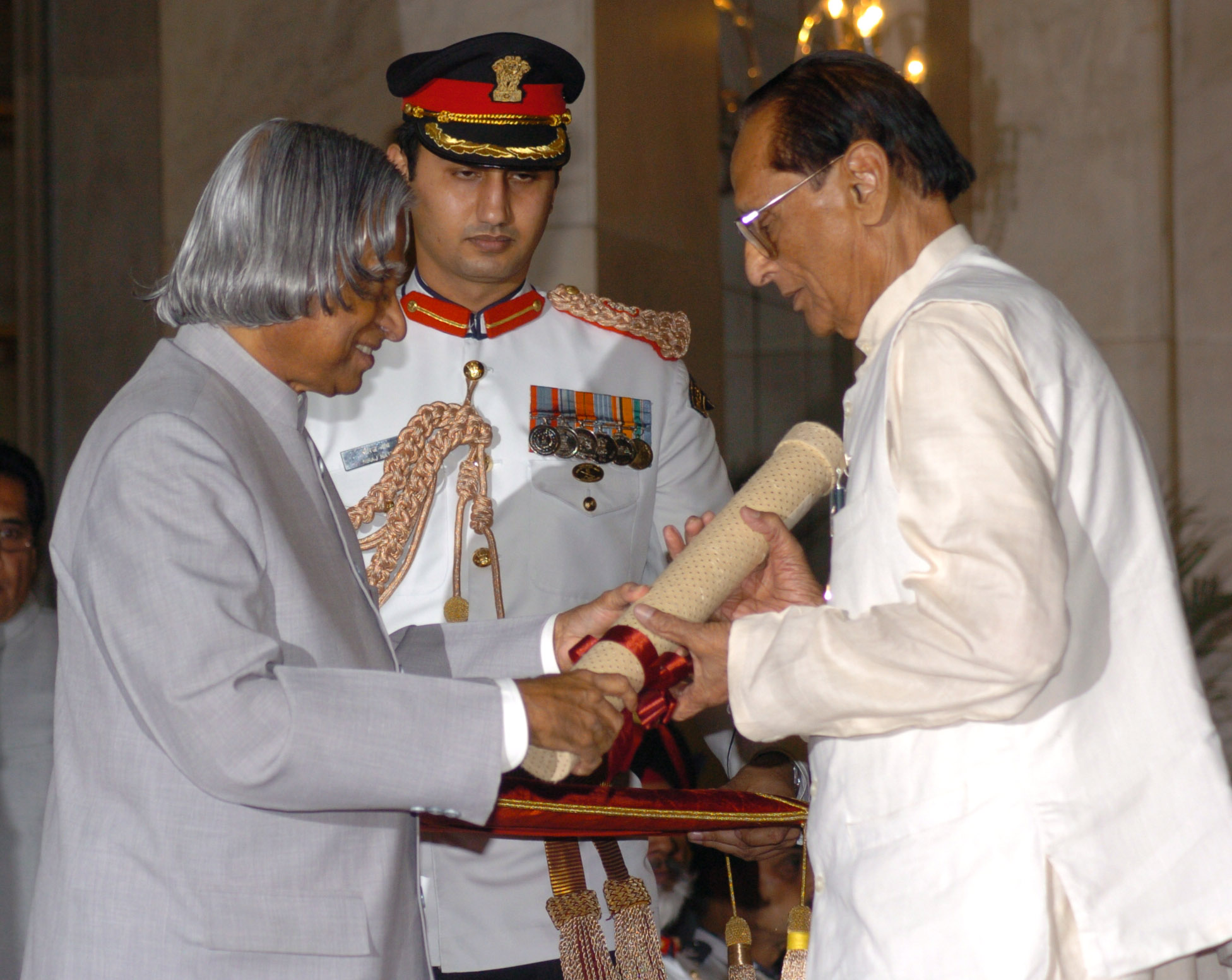
- The President, Dr. A.P.J. Abdul Kalam presenting Padma Bhushan to Shri Shashi Bhushan, in 2006.
- Born: 11 November 1924; Lashkar, Madhya Pradesh, India
- Died: 30 September 2011 (aged 86); New Delhi, India
- Occupations: Freedom activist politician Social worker
- Awards: Padma Bhushan
- Website: Website

Shashi Bhushan (1924–2011) was an Indian independence activist, social worker, politician, writer and an institution builder. He was the founder of several organisations such as Rashtriya Ekta Samiti, All India Freedom Fighters' Organisation, Punjab Ekta Samiti and the Institute for Socialist Education, and represented Khargone (Madhya Pradesh) (1967- 1971) and South Delhi constituency in the 5th Lok Sabha (1971–1977).

== Early life ==
Born on 11 November 1924 at Lashkar of the Indian princely state of Gwalior, now in the state of Madhya Pradesh). Shashi Bhushan was involved in the Indian freedom struggle and participated in the Quit India movement.

== Political career ==
After the Indian independence, he continued his association with the Indian National Congress and contested in the Indian general elections of 1971, winning from South Delhi constituency against Balraj Madhok, the then president of Jan Sangh. He was the author Feroze Gandhi: A Political Biography, the only known work about the life of the politician-journalist husband of Indira Gandhi. He has been Member of parliament, Lok Sabha from Khargone (Lok Sabha constituency) of Madhya Pradesh from 1967-1971 and South Delhi (Lok Sabha constituency) in 5th Lok Sabha.

== Awards and Honour ==
The Government of India awarded him the third highest civilian honour of the Padma Bhushan, in 2006, for his contributions to public affairs. The Institute for Social Education, an institution he founded in 1970, was awarded the National Communal Harmony Award by the President of India in 2007.

== Personal life and death ==
He died on 30 September 2011, at the age of 86, succumbing to age-related illnesses, survived by his wife, son and daughter.

== See also ==
- Haridas Mundhra
- Feroze Gandhi
