= Krishna Murari Moghe =

Indian politician

Mayor of Indore
- In office December 2009 – February 2015
- Preceded by: Dr. Umashashi Sharma
- Succeeded by: Malini Gaur

Member of Parliament, Lok Sabha
- In office 2004–2007
- Succeeded by: Arun Yadav
- Constituency: Khargone

Personal details
- Born: 2 December 1947 (age 78) Bhorasa, Vidisha, Madhya Pradesh
- Party: Bharatiya Janata Party
- Spouse: Shubhangi Moghe
- Children: 1
- Education: B. A.
- Alma mater: S.S.R. Jain College, Vidisha, Madhya Pradesh
- Occupation: Politician
- Profession: Agriculturist

Krishna Murari Moghe (born 2 December 1947) is an Indian politician. He was elected as 14th Mayor of Indore from December 2009 until his resignation in February 2015, he served as the housing board minister of Madhya Pradesh. He served as State Secretary of BJP. He served as Member of Parliament from Khargone from 2004 to 2007. He was chairman of the All India Council of Mayors.
