= Bhagwanpura, Madhya Pradesh =

Bhagwanpura Bagwanpoora
- village
- Location in Madhya Pradesh, India Bhagwanpura (India)
- Coordinates: 21.68°N 75.59°E
- Country: India
- State: Madhya Pradesh
- District: Khargone

Government
  - Body: Vijaysingh Solanki MLA

Languages
  - Official: Hindi
- Time zone: UTC+5:30 (IST)
- ISO 3166 code: IN-MP
- Vehicle registration: MP

Bhagwanpura, Madhya Pradesh is a village & Tehsil in Khargone district in the Indian state of Madhya Pradesh.

== Geography ==
Bhagwanpura is located in the Narmada Valley, at 21.68°N 75.59°E. Situated in southern area of Khargone district, Bhagwanpura lies 29 km (18 mi) from Khargone. It is a Tehsil of Khargone district.
