= Wijesinha =

Wijesinha is a Sinhalese surname. Notable people with the surname include:

- Bertie Wijesinha (1920–2017), Ceylonese cricketer
- Sam Wijesinha (1921–2014), Sri Lankan politician
- Rajiva Wijesinha (born 1954), Sri Lankan writer, son of Sam
