= Sanawad =

- Town
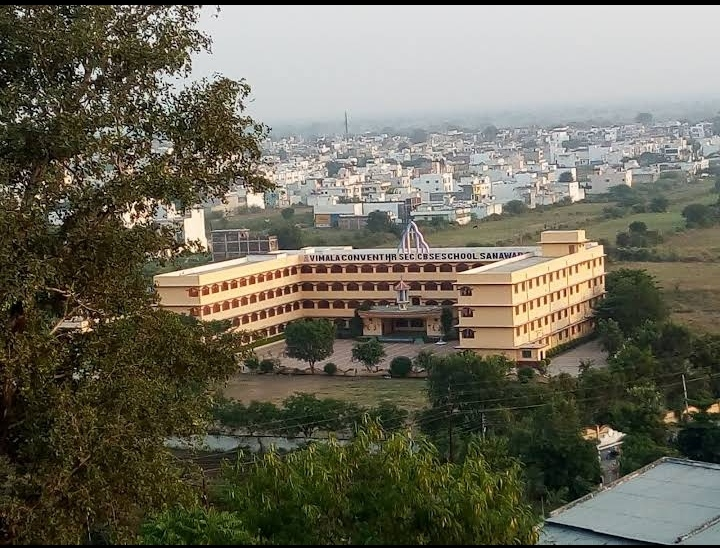
- Sanawad City View

- Location within Madhya Pradesh
- Coordinates: 22°10′59.98″N 76°04′0.12″E
- Country: India
- State: Madhya Pradesh
- Region: Nimar
- District: Khargone District
- Established: 1000 year Old

Government
  - Type: Municipality
  - Nagar palika Adhyaksh: Sunita Birla (Congress)
  - leader of opposition: Gajendra Upadhyay (BJP)
- Time zone: UTC+5:30 (IST)
- Spoken Languages: Hindi, English, Nimari

Sanawad is an Indian town and Municipality in Khargone district in the Indian state of Madhya Pradesh. It is a popular center for the trade of cotton and wheat. Nearby cities include Khargone, Khandwa, Barwaha and Indore.

== Demographics ==
Sanawad is a Municipality in Khargone district, West Nimar, Madhya Pradesh. Sanawad is divided into 18 wards for which elections are held every 5 years. In the 2011 census of India Sanawad had population of 38,740 of which 19,902 were male while 18,838 were female.

The population of children aged 0–6 is 4832 which is 12.47% of total population of Sanawad (M). In Sanawad Municipality, the female sex ratio is 947 against a state average of 931. Moreover, the child sex ratio in Sanawad is around 914 compared to Madhya Pradesh state average of 918. The literacy rate of Sanawad city is 85.07% higher than a state average of 69.32%. In Sanawad, male literacy is around 90.67% while the female literacy rate is 79.17%.

Sanawad Municipality has total administration over 7,454 houses to which it supplies basic amenities like water and sewerage. It is also authorized to build roads within Municipality limits and impose taxes on properties coming under its jurisdiction.

Religion in Sanawad
Religion	Percent
Hindus	68.89%
Muslims	26.90%
Jains	3.29%
Others†	0.1%
Christians	0.25%
Distribution of religions †Includes Sikhs (0.52%), Buddhists (0.6%).

== Economy ==
•The economy is primarily based on agriculture and trade. The main crops grown are cotton, chili, wheat and soybean.

•Sanawad is prime economic centre for around 20–25 km radius, it is also known for its rich market and trading. Traders from many nearby villages trade here.

•Sanawad is also well known for Avanti textile mill from where threads are sent to various parts of the country.

== History ==
The town of Sanawad was formerly known as Gulshanabad.

Sanawad was home to freedom fighters Brij Mohan Sharma (also known as Birju Seth), Shri Mangilal Patni, Kamal Chand Jain (or Master Saab) and Jagdeesh Vidyarthi; all of whom were active in opposing British rule. The Misa bandhu is Lala Jivandas Bansal And Vimalchand Patni.

The town is around 10 km from Raverkhedi village where Bajirao I spent his last time and died.

== Culture ==
Sanawad has cultural sites such as the Namokar Dham Jain temple garden near the Jain temple Podumpuram, Digambar Jain Temple which is more than 100 years old and religious sites such as Omkareshwar. Sanawad is located at 5 km from Motakka/Omkareshwar road. Every December a Mela is held in Sanawad.

== Transport ==
- Sanawad is well connected with nearby cities mainly through all weather roads.
- Sanawad is currently connected with Railway route to Khandwa.
- Nearest Airport is in Indore Devi Ahilyabai Holkar Airport.
