= Ramesh Patel (politician) =

Indian politician

Member of the Madhya Pradesh Legislative Assembly
- In office 2013–2018
- Preceded by: Premsingh Patel
- Constituency: Barwani

Personal details
- Born: Village Sustikheda, Barwani
- Party: Indian National Congress
- Spouse: Mathurabai Patel
- Education: 8th pass
- Profession: Politician
- As of 11 July, 2018 Source: ["Biography:Patel, Ramesh" (PDF). Madhya Pradesh Legislative Assembly.]

Ramesh Patel is an Indian politician and a member of the Indian National Congress.

== Political career ==
He became an MLA in 2013 Madhya Pradesh Legislative Assembly election.

== Personal life ==
He is married to Mathurabai Patel and has three sons and two daughters.

== See also ==
- Madhya Pradesh Legislative Assembly
- 2013 Madhya Pradesh Legislative Assembly election
