= Rameshwar Patidar =

Indian politician (1938–2021)

Rameshwar Pattidar (10 November 1938 – 27 April 2021) was an Indian politician and a leader of Bharatiya Janata Party. He was imprisoned under MISA during the emergency in 1975. He was elected to the 6th Lok Sabha from Khargone in Madhya Pradesh state in 1977. He was re-elected to the Lok Sabha in 1989, 1991, 1996 and 1998 from the same constituency.
