= Indore division =

Administrative division of India

Coordinates: 22.7°N 75.9°E

Map of Indore Division

Indore division is an administrative geographical unit of Madhya Pradesh state of India. Indore is the administrative headquarters of the division.

The division consists of districts of Indore, Barwani, Burhanpur, Dhar, Jhabua, Khandwa, Khargone and Alirajpur.

In late 2025, Indore and Ujjain divisions have received low rainfall.
