= Kasrawad =

- Location in Madhya Pradesh, India Kasrawad (India)
- Coordinates: 22.13°N 75.6°E
- Country: India
- State: Madhya Pradesh
- District: Khargone

Government
  - Type: Nagar Palika Parishad
  - Body: Sachin Yadav (MLA)
- Elevation: 169 m (554 ft)

Population
  - Total: 22,750

Languages
  - Official: nimadi
- Time zone: UTC+5:30 (IST)
- Pincode: 451228
- STD Code: 07285

Kasrawad is a tehsil and nagar panchayat in Khargone district in the Indian state of Madhya Pradesh. Kasrawad Assembly constituency is one of the 230 Vidhan Sabha (Legislative Assembly) constituencies of Madhya Pradesh state in central India.

== Geography ==
Kasrawad is located at 22.13°N 75.6°E. It has an average elevation of 169 metres (554 feet) and is 17 km in east from National Highway 3 (Agra to Mumbai) and about 100 km from Indore.The town is 5 km from the northern banks of the holy Narmada River.

== History ==
Kasrawad was an important Buddhist centre during the ancient and medieval periods of the Indian history. Some Buddhist remains and stupas at Kasrawad are considered the 'sites of national importance' by the Archaeological Survey of India. The Chalcolithic site of Navdatoli is located 6 kilometers northwest of Kasrawad, on the banks of the Narmada River, opposite Maheshwar. It dates back to the 2nd millennium BCE

A Mughal Sarai Masjid was also present near a pond which is used for doing wudu, this site is close to Buddhist remains.

== Demographics ==
Religion in Kasrawad
Religion	Percent
Hindus	78.55%
Muslims	19.83%
Jains	1.38%
Christians	0.17%
Others†	0.07%
Distribution of religions †Includes Sikhs (0.02%), Buddhists (0.03%).

At the 2011 India census, Kasrawad had a population of 22,750. Males were 50.91% of the population and females 49.09%. The average literacy rate was 57%, lower than the national average of 59.5%. Male literacy was 66% and female literacy 48%. 16% of the population were under the age of 6 years.

=== ~~Languages~~ ===
Languages of Kasrawad town (2011)
1. Hindi (49.5%)
2. Nimadi (27.6%)
3. Urdu (19.4%)
