= Khargone =

- City
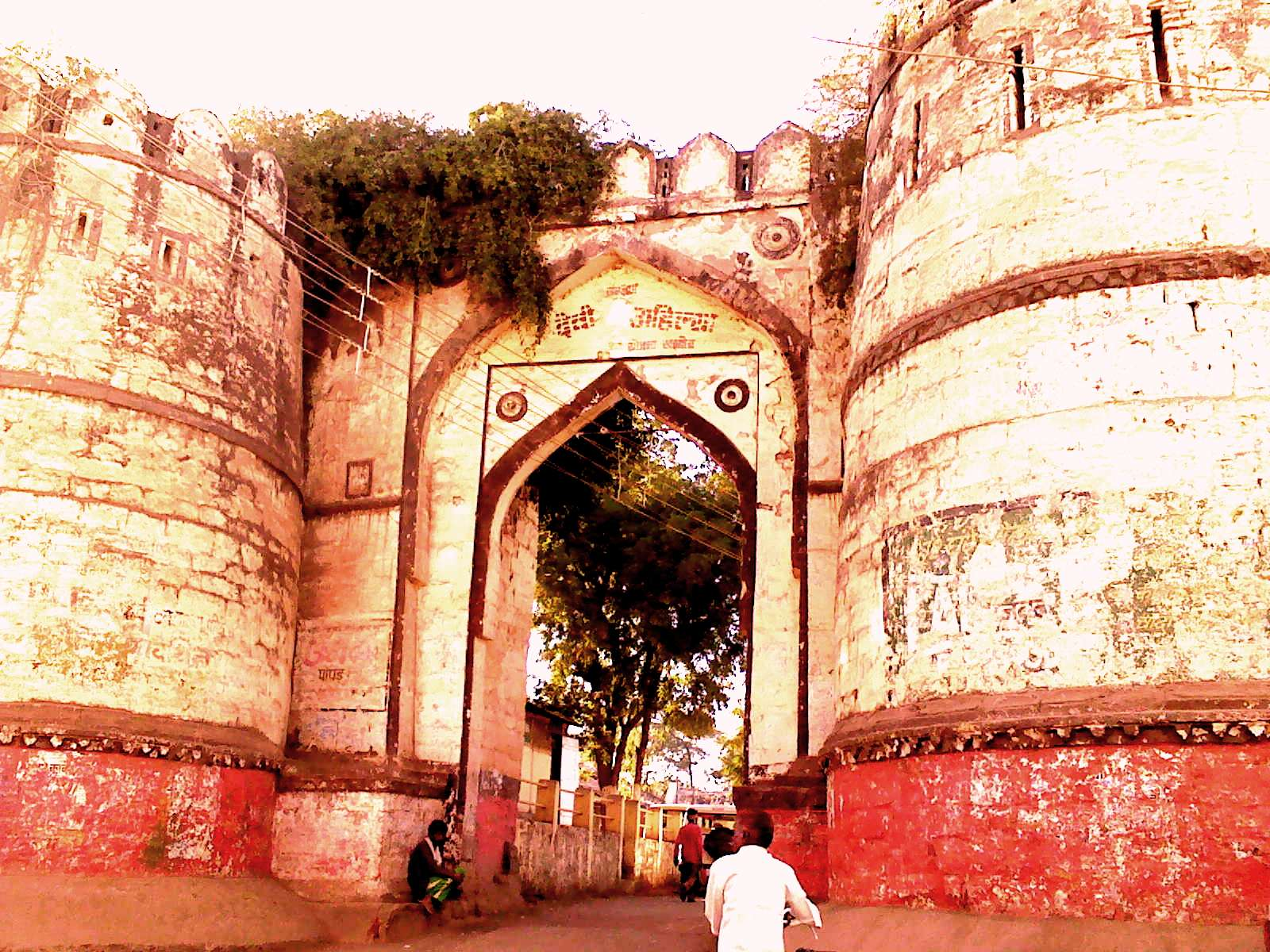
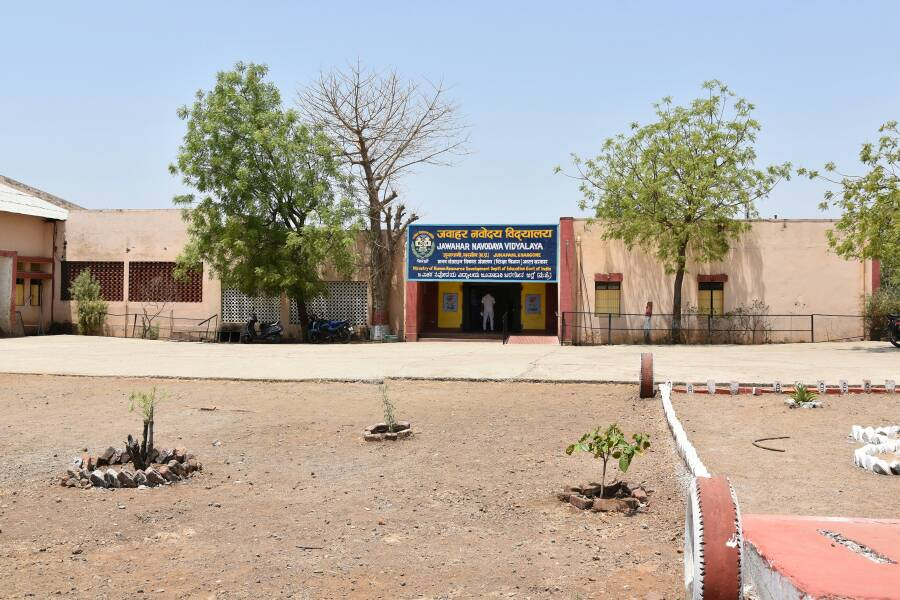
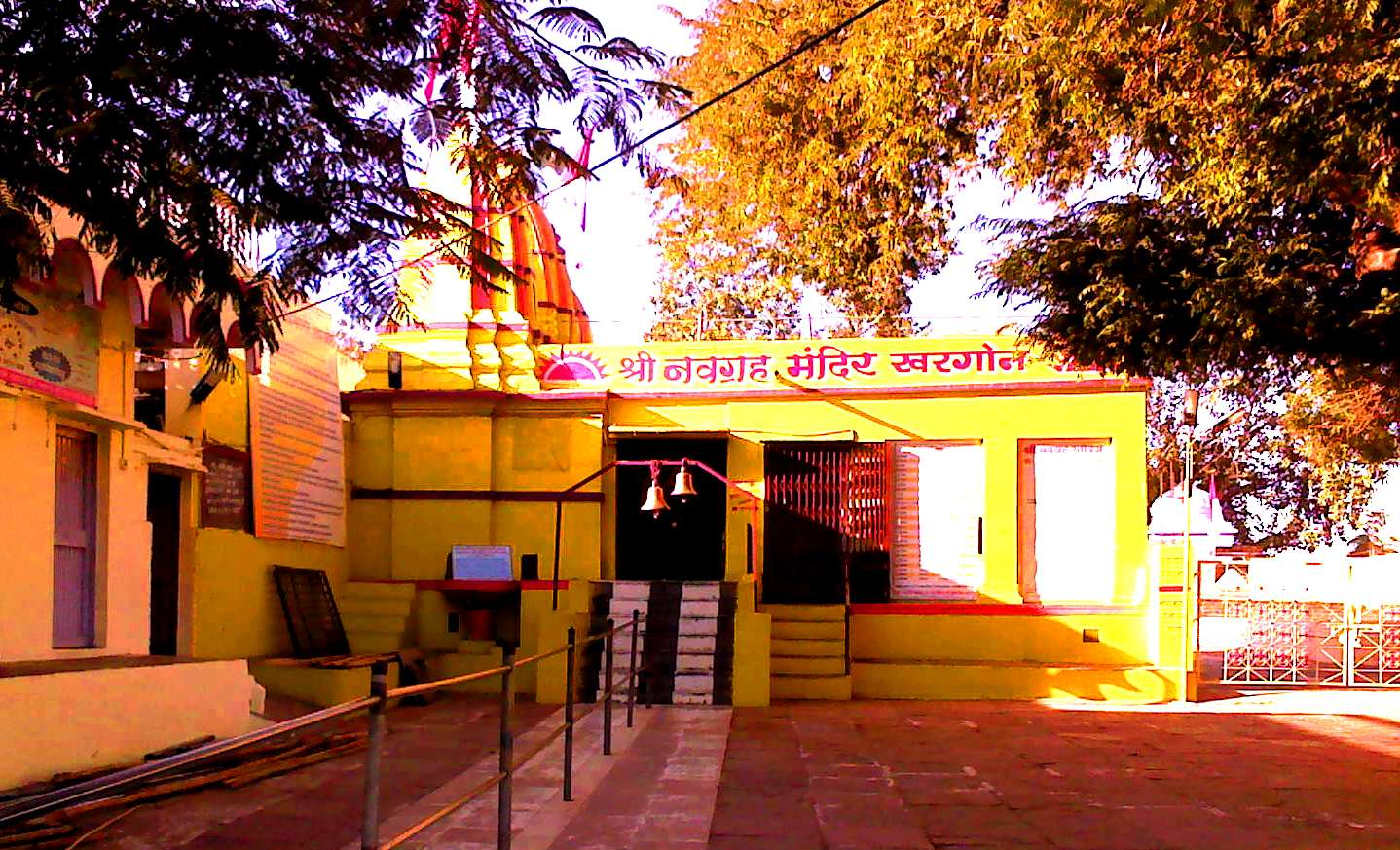
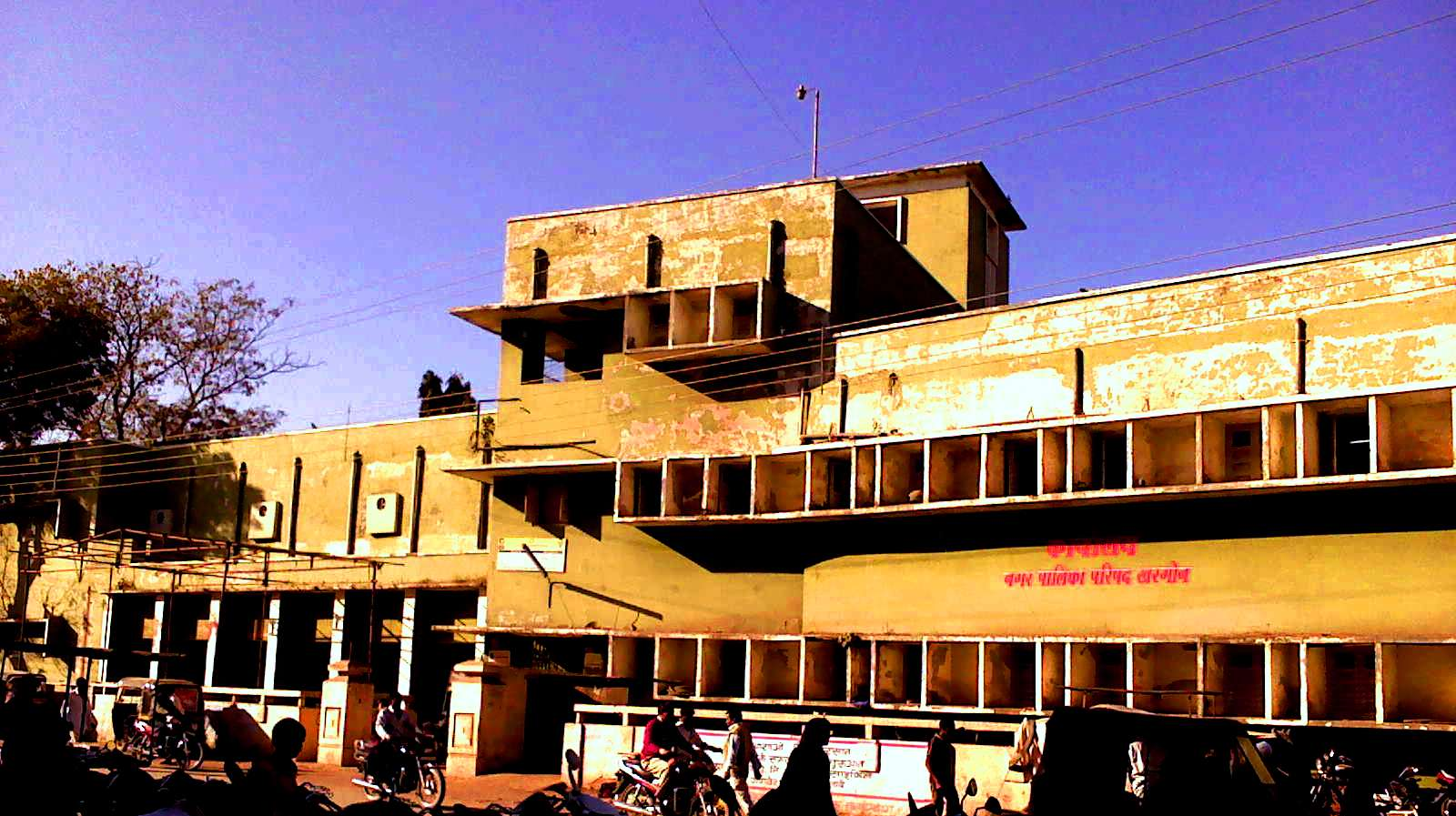
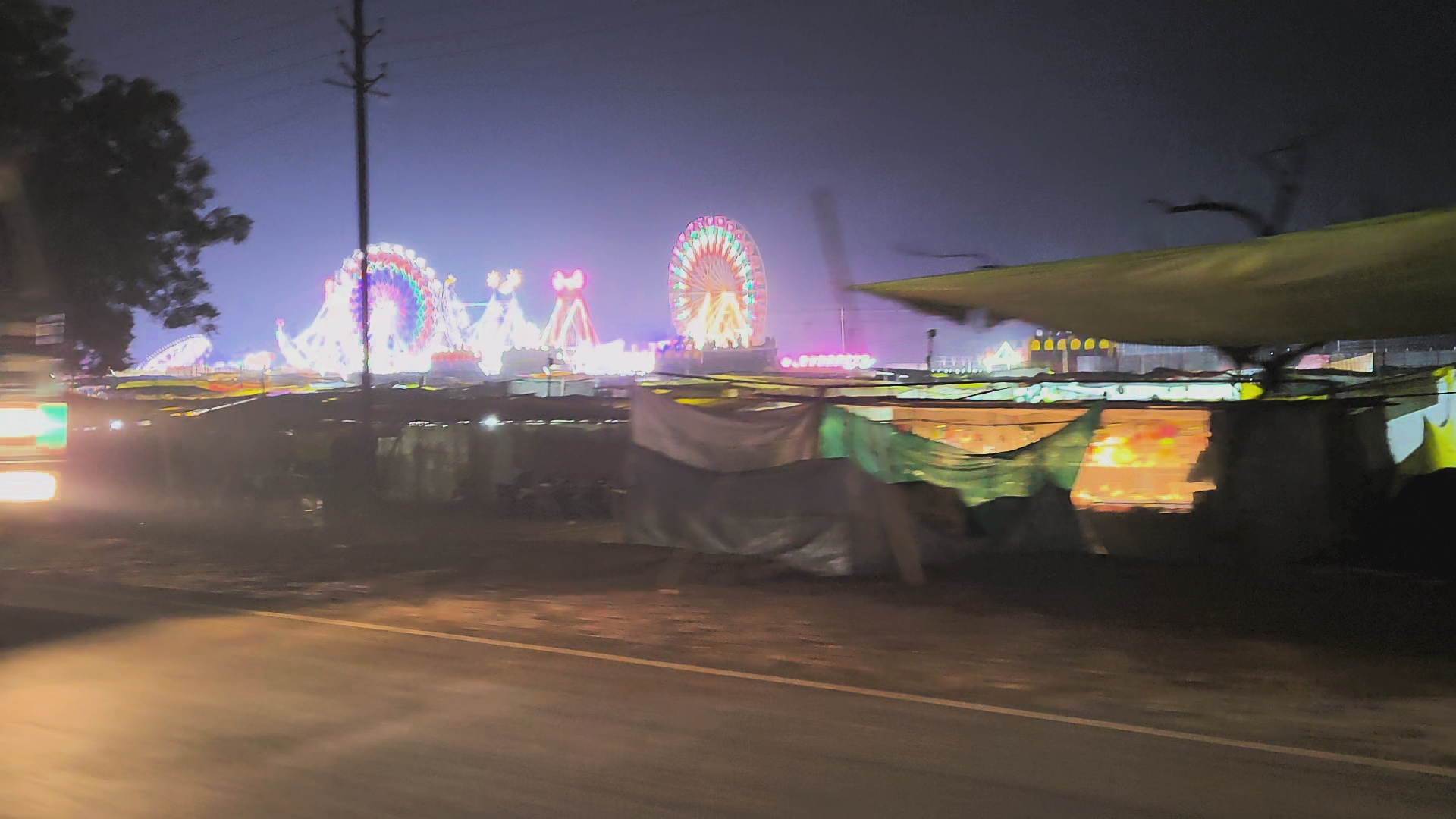
- Khargone Fort JNV Khargone Navagaraha Temple Khargone Town Hall Khargone Navgraha Mela Khargone
- Nickname: Village of Cotton and Chilli
- Location in Madhya Pradesh, India
- Coordinates: 21.82°N 75.6187°E
- Country: India
- State: Madhya Pradesh
- District: Khargone
- Region: Nimar
- Elevation: 258 m (846 ft)

Population (2011)
  - City: 106,454
  - Rank: 243rd 23rd (in Madhya Pradesh state)
  - Urban: 215,000
  - Metro: 133,368

Languages
  - Official: Hindi and English
  - Regional: Hindi and Nimadi
- Time zone: UTC+5:30 (IST)
- PIN: 451001
- Telephone code: 07282
- Vehicle registration: MP-10
- Sex ratio: 1000/945 ♂/♀
- Literacy Rate: 80.63%
- HDI: High
- Climate: Cwa / Aw (Köppen)
- Precipitation: 914 mm (36.0 in)
- Avg. annual temperature: 26.0 °C (78.8 °F)
- Avg. summer temperature: 45 °C (113 °F)
- Avg. winter temperature: 21 °C (70 °F)
- Website: khargone.nic.in

Khargone is a city and administrative headquarters of the Khargone district in the Indian state of Madhya Pradesh. The city is located on the bank of the Kunda river and is known for its cotton and chili pepper production. It is also known for Navgraha Mandir, a temple devoted to the nav grahas (nine planets). Khargone topped the nation in municipality and received a national award for 'India's Fastest Moving City' under a population of two lakh. Khargone was ranked 10th cleanest city in India in Swachh Survekshan 2020, the 15th cleanest city in India in Swachh Survekshan 2018, and the 17th cleanest city in India in Swachh Survekshan 2017.

== History ==
According to mythology, the name "Nimar" was derived from the word "Nimarya" (निमार्य), which signifies that the land had belonged to both the Aryas and the non-Arya. However, according to another myth, the word "Nimar" has been associated with the place due to the presence of many Neem trees.

At different times in history, the area was ruled by the Kingdoms of Haihayas (हैहय) of Maheshwar, Parmar of Malwa, Ahirs of Asirgarh, Muslims of Mandav, Mughals and Marathas. After the formation of the state of Madhya Pradesh on 1 November 1956, the district came into existence as West Nimar (पश्चिम निमाड़). Later (on 25 May 1998) due to certain administrative needs, the district was divided between Khargone and Barwani. The population of the district was estimated to be about 1,872,413, according to the census of India 2011.

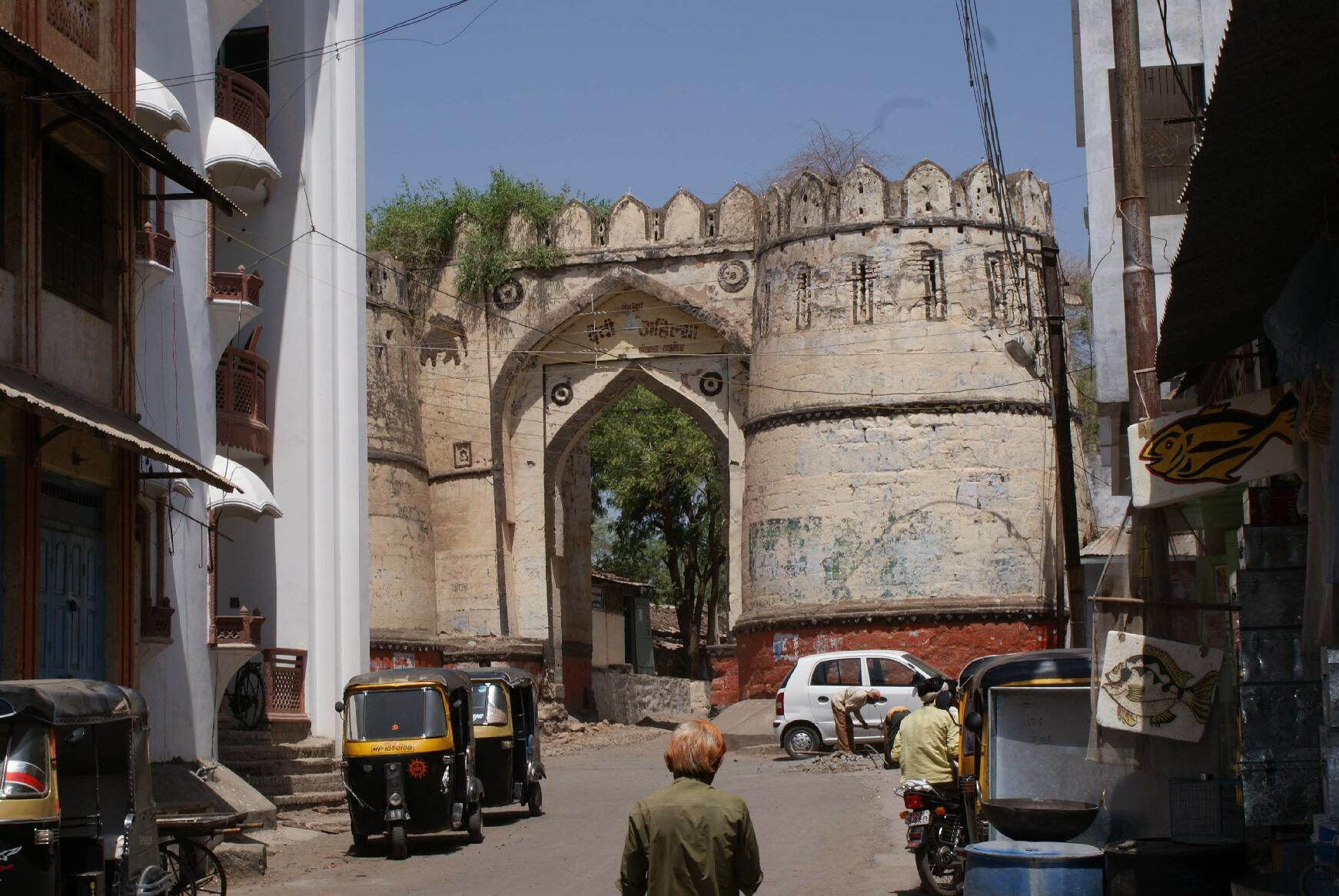
The old fort entrance.

== Tourism ==
Here the very ancient Shri Navagraha Temple is situated on the banks of the Kunda river, due to which the city is known as Navgrah ki Nagri (City of Navagraha),

Near 17 Kilometer, Oon is a very old village in which are 99 Bhumija-style temples built by emperor Ballaleshwar. Oon has a MahaLakshmi and Jain temple.

=== Jain temples ===
Chaubara Dera 2 and Gwaleshwar temple are two 12th-century Jain temples built in Western Chalukya architecture. Chaubara Dera 2 houses three inscriptions dated 1170 CE, 1185 CE and 1165 CE. Gwaleshwar temple or popularly known as Pavagiri is an ancient Jain temple. The name, Gwaleshwar temple, is derived from the fact the Jain monks used to take shelter in the temple during storms. This temple is a siddh kshetra, believed to be place of nirvana for many Jain monks. The mulnayak of the temple is seated on triratha pedestal bearing a 13th-century inscription.

== Geography ==
Khargone is located in the south-west border of Madhya Pradesh, 258 metres (846 ft) above sea level. It is spread over an area of 8,030 square kilometres (3,100 sq mi). Towards the north it borders Dhar, Indore and Dewas districts. Towards the south, it borders Maharashtra, in the east, Khandwa and Burhanpur, Barwani in the west. Khargone is in the middle of the Narmada River valley with the Vindhyachal mountain range situated in the north and Satpura in the south. The River Narmada flows along a path of 50 kilometres (31 mi) inside the district. Veda and Kunda are the other two main rivers in the district.

== Demographics ==
Khargone is growing fast as a city, and it now includes many flourishing villages. As of 2011 India census, Khargone had a population of 1,16,150. While males constitute 51.44% of the population, females average 49.46%. Khargone has an average literacy rate of 80.9%. This is higher than the national average of 74.04%: male literacy is 87.84%, and female literacy is 75.73%. About 13% of the population is under 6 years of age.

Religion in Khargone City (2011)
Religion	Percent
Hindus	60.50%
Muslims	38.23%
Jains	0.56%
Others†	0.8%
Christians	0.18%
Distribution of religions †Includes Sikhs (0.38%), Buddhists (0.5%).

== Climate ==
Khargone has a transitional climate between a tropical wet and dry climate and a humid subtropical climate. Three distinct seasons are observed: summer, monsoon and winter. Summers are extremely hot and dry in this region, lasting from mid-march to mid-June followed by the monsoon season. The temperatures in summer are usually above 40 °C (104 °F) during April–May. During these months when temperatures become very high, the dry and hot wind (locally known as "loo") blows in this area, widely affecting the local ecology. The temperature also remains quite high during the night.

The monsoon arrives in late June, with temperatures around 29 °C (84 °F) and about 36 inches (914 mm) rainfall. The rainy season is humid and has substantial rainfall. Local people are commonly affected by the flooding of river Kunda, which flows from the outskirts of the city. Winters start in mid-November and are dry, mild and sunny. Temperatures average about 4–15 °C (39–59 °F), but can fall close to freezing on some nights.

Climate data for Khargone (1991–2020, extremes 1969–2020)
Month	Jan	Feb	Mar	Apr	May	Jun	Jul	Aug	Sep	Oct	Nov	Dec	Year
Record high °C (°F)	36.2 (97.2)	39.6 (103.3)	43.6 (110.5)	46.2 (115.2)	47.9 (118.2)	47.6 (117.7)	43.0 (109.4)	38.6 (101.5)	41.8 (107.2)	42.4 (108.3)	38.7 (101.7)	38.4 (101.1)	47.9 (118.2)
Mean daily maximum °C (°F)	27.9 (82.2)	31.5 (88.7)	36.6 (97.9)	41.3 (106.3)	42.7 (108.9)	38.6 (101.5)	33.5 (92.3)	31.2 (88.2)	33.2 (91.8)	34.9 (94.8)	31.6 (88.9)	30.4 (86.7)	34.6 (94.3)
Mean daily minimum °C (°F)	8.9 (48.0)	12.1 (53.8)	18.0 (64.4)	24.4 (75.9)	26.7 (80.1)	25.0 (77.0)	22.8 (73.0)	22.4 (72.3)	22.6 (72.7)	20.5 (68.9)	16.3 (61.3)	10.8 (51.4)	19.7 (67.5)
Record low °C (°F)	4.0 (39.2)	3.5 (38.3)	7.6 (45.7)	12.0 (53.6)	20.5 (68.9)	15.1 (59.2)	18.2 (64.8)	18.1 (64.6)	12.7 (54.9)	10.7 (51.3)	6.5 (43.7)	0.2 (32.4)	0.2 (32.4)
Average rainfall mm (inches)	3.1 (0.12)	0.1 (0.00)	2.5 (0.10)	1.8 (0.07)	4.3 (0.17)	56.8 (2.24)	132.4 (5.21)	115.4 (4.54)	46.1 (1.81)	26.0 (1.02)	1.8 (0.07)	1.4 (0.06)	391.5 (15.41)
Average rainy days	0.2	0.0	0.2	0.0	0.3	3.9	7.0	4.9	2.9	1.1	0.2	0.1	20.8
Average relative humidity (%)	74	66	53	51	57	69	80	86	82	71	72	75	69
Source: India Meteorological Department

== Education ==
=== Colleges ===
There are various colleges in the district. These are affiliated with Devi Ahilya Vishwavidyalay, Indore (University of Indore) and offer several graduate and postgraduate-level courses. The list includes:

- Jawaharlal Institute of Technology, Borawan
- Alma Computer Khargone
- Devi Rukmini college of Education
- Government Girls Degree College
- Government Post Graduate Degree College
- Jawaharlal Nehru Mahavidyalaya
- Modak Institute of technology
- Nimar Institute of Information Technology and Science (NIITS), Khargone
- Saikripa Academy Khargone
- Shree Narayan Institute of Technology (SNIT)
- Shreeji Institute Of Technology and Management College
- Vikalp Krishi Shikshan Sansthan (College of Agriculture), Khargone.

=== Schools ===
There are various schools.

These are affiliated with CBSE:

- Aaditya vidya vihar higher secondary school, khargone
- Creative Public School
- Devi Rukmani Higher Secondary School, Khargone
- Gokuldas Public School
- Kendriya Vidyalaya Khargone
- Maharishi Vidya Mandir, Khargone
- St. Jude's higher secondary school, Khargone

There are also Board of Secondary Education, Madhya Pradesh affiliated schools in Khargone as:

- Bal Shiksha Niketan
- D.A.G.H.S.S. No.1 (utkrisht school)
- D.A.G.H.S.S. No.2 (school of excellence)
- Gayatri Shiksha Niketan
- Govt. higher secondary school no.7 (Motipura)
- Priyadarshini higher secondary school
- Saraswati Shishu
- Vikalp Group of Education (School)
