= Khargone district =

Coordinates: 21°49′23″N 75°36′37″E

- District of Madhya Pradesh
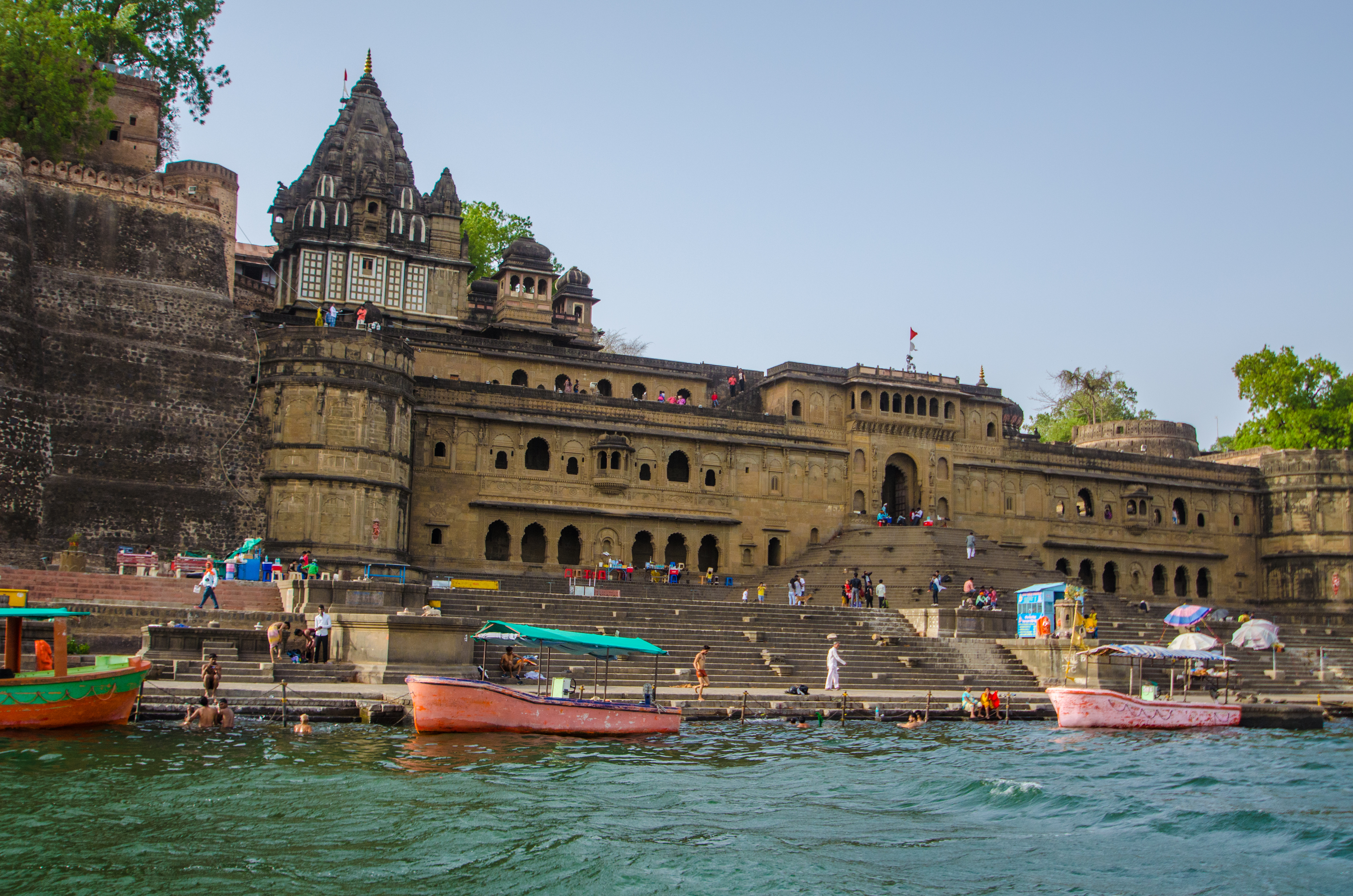
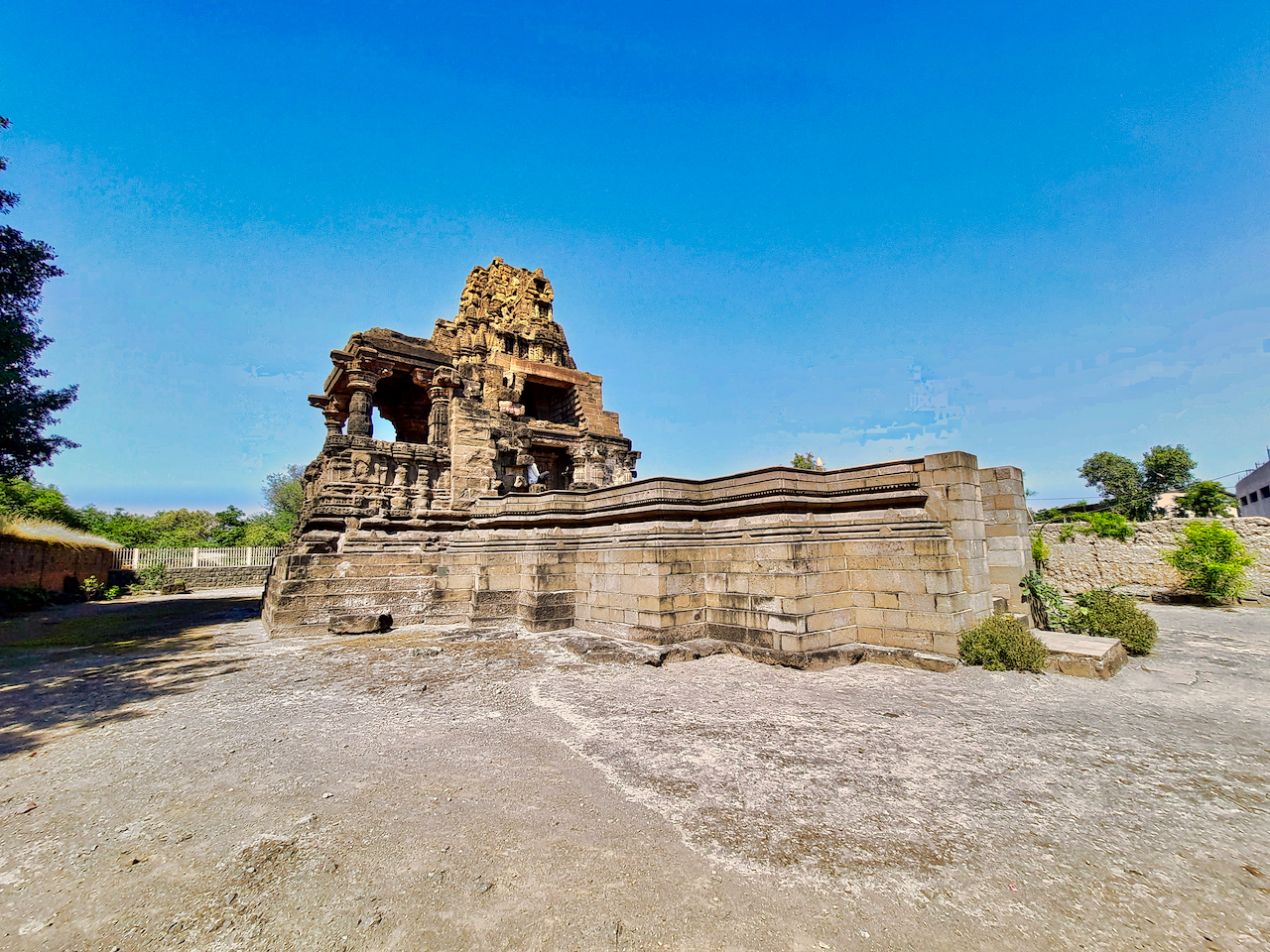
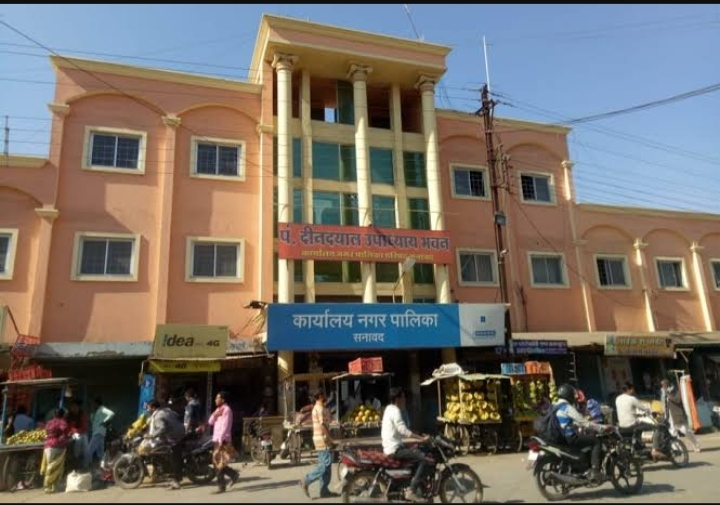
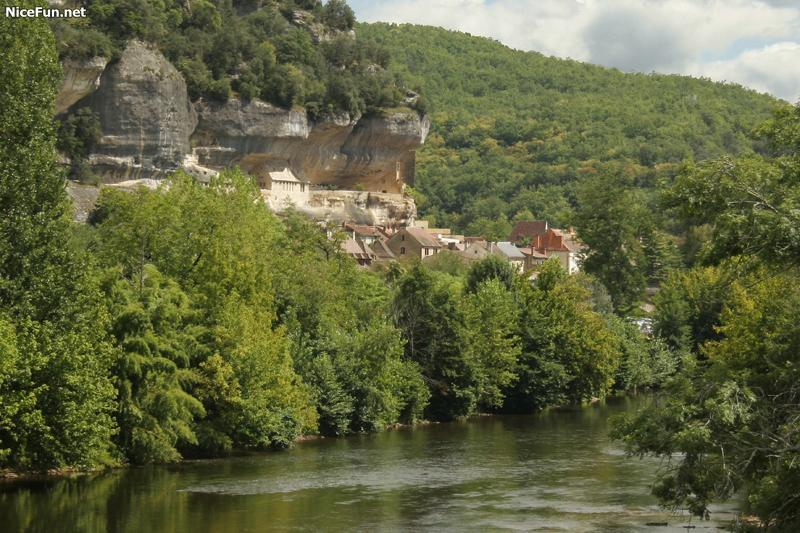
- Clockwise from top-left: Maheshwar Fort from Narmada, Nagar Palika building of Sanawad, hills near Gogawan, Mahalakeshwar Temple, Un

- Location of Khargone district in Madhya Pradesh
- Country: India
- State: Madhya Pradesh
- Division: Indore
- Headquarters: Khargone
- Tehsils: 1. Khargone; 2. Barwaha; 3. Bhagwanpura; 4. Bhikangaon; 5. Gogawan; 6. Segaon; 7. Jhirnya; 8. Kasrawad; 9. Maheshwar

Government
  - Lok Sabha constituencies: Khargone (Lok Sabha constituency) and Khandwa (Lok Sabha constituency)

Area
  - Total: 8,030 km^{2} (3,100 sq mi)

Population (2011)
  - Total: 1,873,046
  - Density: 233/km^{2} (604/sq mi)

Demographics
  - Literacy: 63.98%
  - Sex ratio: 965
- Time zone: UTC+05:30 (IST)
- Major highways: Chittaurgarh - Bhusawal Highway, Khandwa - Vadodara Highway, Agra-Mumbai Highway, Indore-Icchapur Highway, Madhya Pradesh
- Website: khargone.nic.in

Khargone district (Hindi pronunciation: [kʰəɾgoːn̪]), formerly known as West Nimar district, is a district of Madhya Pradesh state in central India. The district lies in the Nimar region and is part of the Indore Division. The district headquarters is the city of Khargone, which lies south of the Indore metropolis, the headquarters of Indore district.

== History ==
In ancient times, the Haihayas of Mahishmati (present-day Maheshwar) ruled the region. In the early medieval ages, the area was under the Paramaras of Malwa and the rulers of Asirgarh. In the late medieval ages, the area was under the Malwa Sultanate of Mandu.

In 1531, Gujarat sultan Bahadur Shah brought this area under his control. In 1562, Akbar annexed this territory along with the whole Malwa to Mughal Empire. In 1740, Marathas under the Peshwa brought the area under their control. In 1778, the Peshwa distributed this territory to the Maratha rulers: Holkars of Indore, Shinde (Scindia) of Gwalior, and Ponwars of Dhar.

After the independence and merging of the Princely states into the Union of India in 1948, this territory became West Nimar district of Madhya Bharat. Khargone district had been part of the Nerbudda (Narmada) Division of the Central Provinces and Berar, which became the state of Madhya Bharat (later Madhya Pradesh) after India's independence in 1947. On 1 November 1956, this district became part of the newly formed state of Madhya Pradesh. On 25 May 1998, West Nimar district was bifurcated into two districts: Khargone and Barwani.

== Geography ==
The area of the Khargone district is 8,030 km^{2} (3,100 sq mi). The district is situated between 21°22' and 22°35' north latitudes and 74°25' and 76°14' east longitudes. The district is surrounded by the districts of Dhar, Indore, and Dewas to the north; Jalgaon district of Maharashtra state to the south; Khandwa and Burhanpur districts to the east; and Barwani district to the west.

== Economy ==
Khargone's economy is dependent on agriculture, with several other industries in the cities of Barwaha, Sanawad and Nimrani. The major cash crops of the Khargone district are cotton, soybean, and chilli pepper and The second largest red chilli market in Asia is located in Bedia Khargone Madhya Pradesh. It is known for its large volume of Nimari chillies.

The district is India's biggest cotton-producing region. There are various cotton processing units (spinning) in the cooperative sector and private sector. One of the major spinning units is the cooperative Jawaharlal Nehru Sahakari Soot Mill, situated on Julwania Road and Awanti Cotton Mill in Sanawad. The famous Sendhwa cotton hub is just 70 km from Khargone city.

The red chilli pepper is exported abroad. A famous mandi of chilli at Bedia is located about 50 km from Khargone city.

Khargone Super Thermal Power Station is a coal-based thermal power project, located at village Selda and Dalchi in Khargone district. It is the country's first ultra-super critical thermal power plant. The Khargone plant operates at an efficiency of 41.5 per cent.

In 2006 the Ministry of Panchayati Raj named Khargone one of the country's 250 most backward districts (out of a total of 640). It is one of the 24 districts in Madhya Pradesh currently receiving funds from the Backward Regions Grant Fund Programme (BRGF).

== Divisions ==
The district is divided into two sub-divisions, Barwaha and Khargone, which are further divided into nine tehsils. The Barwaha sub-division has three big tehsils (Barwaha, Maheshwar, and Kasrawad) which cover 50% of the area of the Khargone district, while the Khargone sub-division has six small tehsils (sanawad, Gogawan, Segaon, Bhagwanpura, Bhikangaon, and Jhirnya) which cover the remaining 50% of the area.

Khargone city is the administrative headquarters of the district. Other towns include Maheshwar, Kasrawad, Segaon, Bhagwanpura, Jhirnya, Bhikangaon, Gogawan, and Barwaha. Maheshwar is a tourist destination due to it being the former capital of the Haihayas and the Holkars of Indore.

The district consists of six Vidhan Sabha constituencies: Bhikangaon, Barwaha, Maheshwar, Kasrawad, Khargone, and Bhagwanpura. Bhikangaon and Barwaha are a part of the Khandwa Lok Sabha constituency, while the rest are part of the Khargone Lok Sabha constituency.

== Demographics ==
Historical population
Year	Pop.	±% p.a.
1901	189,621	—
1911	258,895	+3.16%
1921	284,976	+0.96%
1931	336,866	+1.69%
1941	387,542	+1.41%
1951	431,704	+1.09%
1961	583,139	+3.05%
1971	767,344	+2.78%
1981	969,735	+2.37%
1991	1,192,520	+2.09%
2001	1,524,637	+2.49%
2011	1,873,046	+2.08%

Religions in Khargone district (2011)
Hinduism	92.12%
Islam	7.21%
Other or not stated	0.67%

According to the 2011 census, Khargone district has a population of 1,873,046, roughly equal to the population of Kosovo or the US state of West Virginia. It ranks 252nd out of the 640 districts in India in terms of population. The district has a population density of 233 inhabitants per square kilometre (600/sq mi). Its population growth rate over the decade 2001–2011 was 22.81%. West Nimar has a sex ratio of 963 females for every 1000 males, and a literacy rate of 63.98%. 15.96% of the population lives in urban areas. Scheduled Castes and Scheduled Tribes make up 11.16% and 38.98% of the population, respectively.

=== Languages ===
Languages of Khargone district (2011)
1. Nimadi (65.8%)
2. Hindi (10.4%)
3. Bareli (8.10%)
4. Bhilali (4.74%)
5. Bhili (4.43%)
6. Urdu (1.98%)
7. Banjari (1.81%)
8. Others (2.76%)

At the time of the 2011 census, 65.80% of the population in the district spoke Nimadi, 10.38% Hindi, 08.10% Bareli, 4.74% Bhilali, 4.43% Bhili, 1.98% Urdu, 1.81% Banjari, 0.61% Gujarati, and 0.43% Marathi as their first language.

Nimadi is the most spoken language in west Nimar. Bareli Palya, a Bhil language, has approximately 10,000 speakers, centered in Madhya Pradesh; Bareli Rathwi, another Bhil language, has approximately 64,000 speakers, written in the Devanagari script; and Bhilali has 1,150,000 speakers.
