= Bhopal =

Metropolis and state capital in Madhya Pradesh, India

Bhopal Bhōpāl (Hindi)
- Metropolis
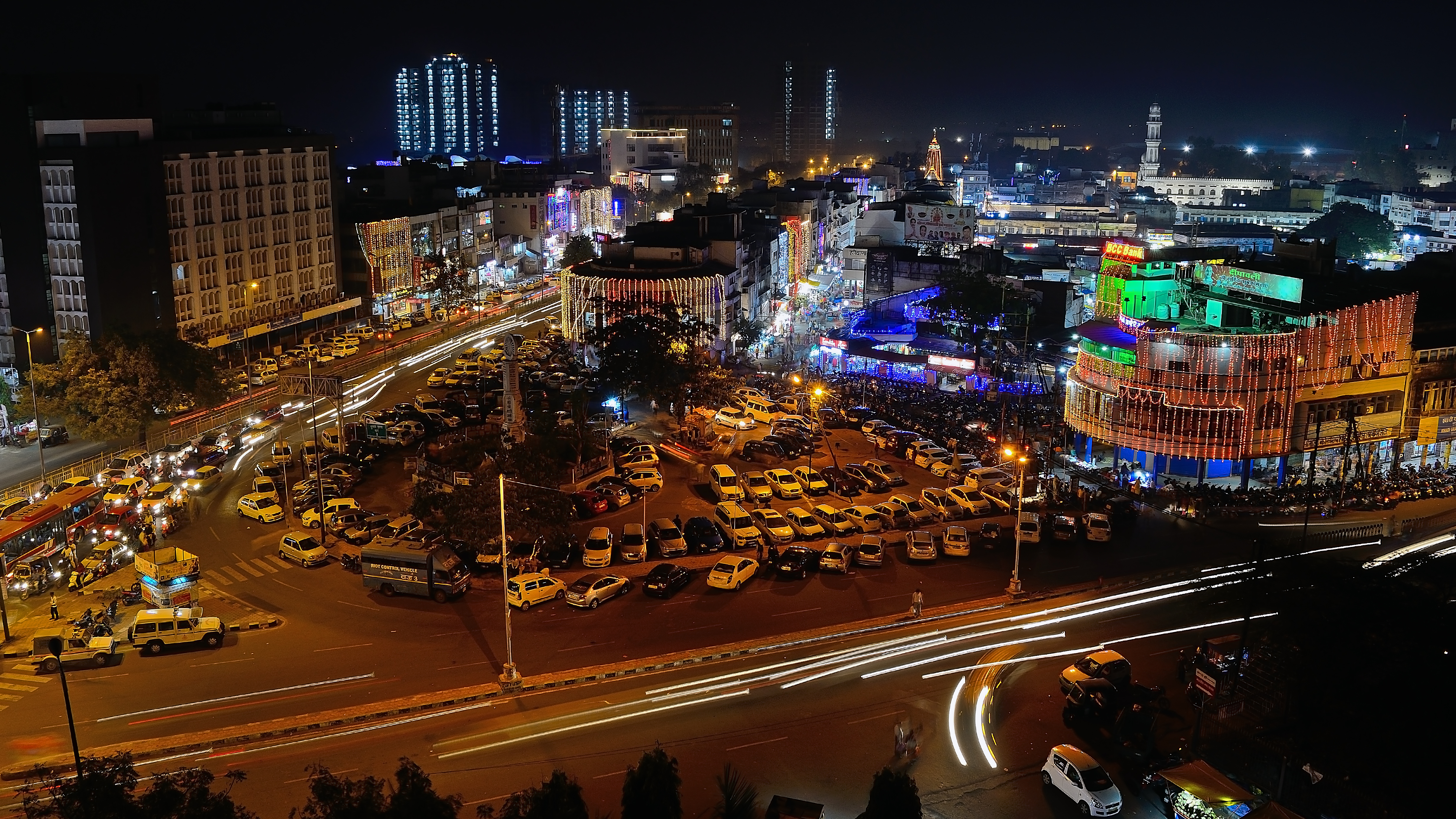
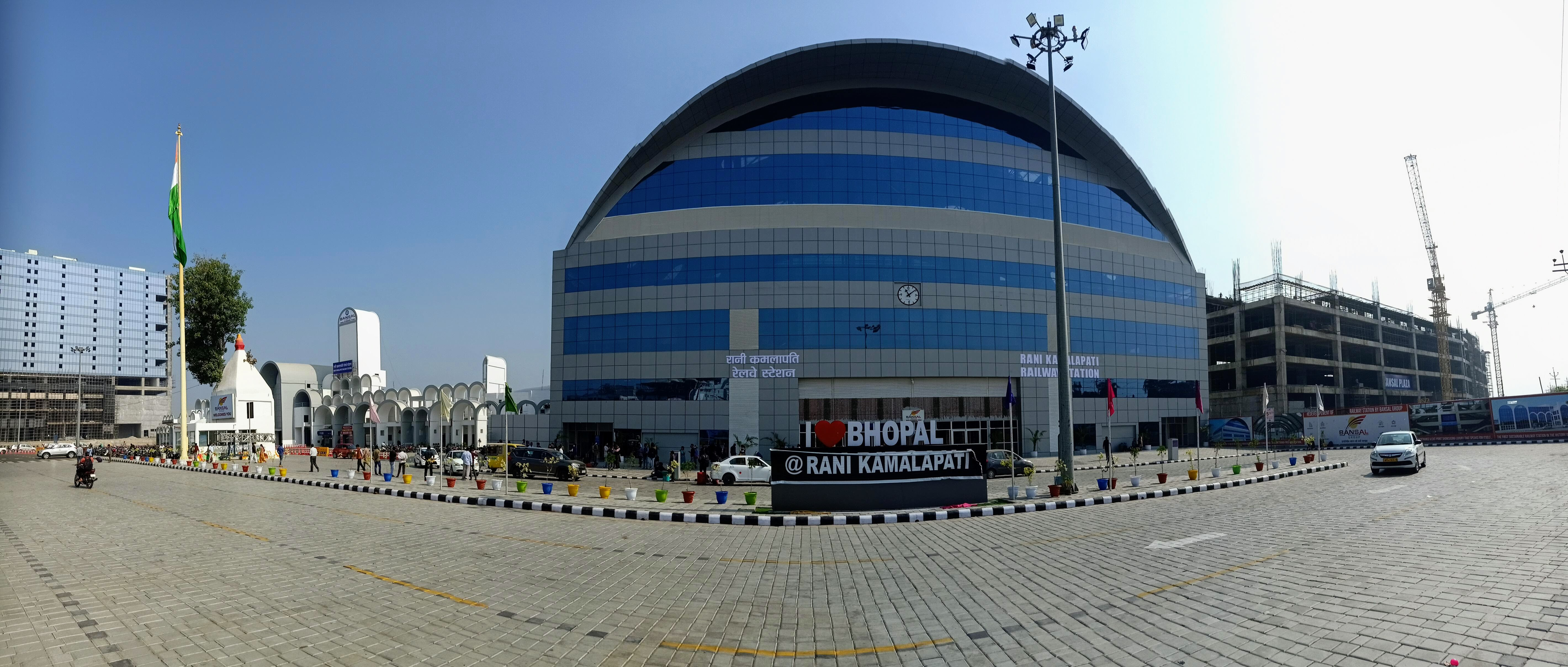
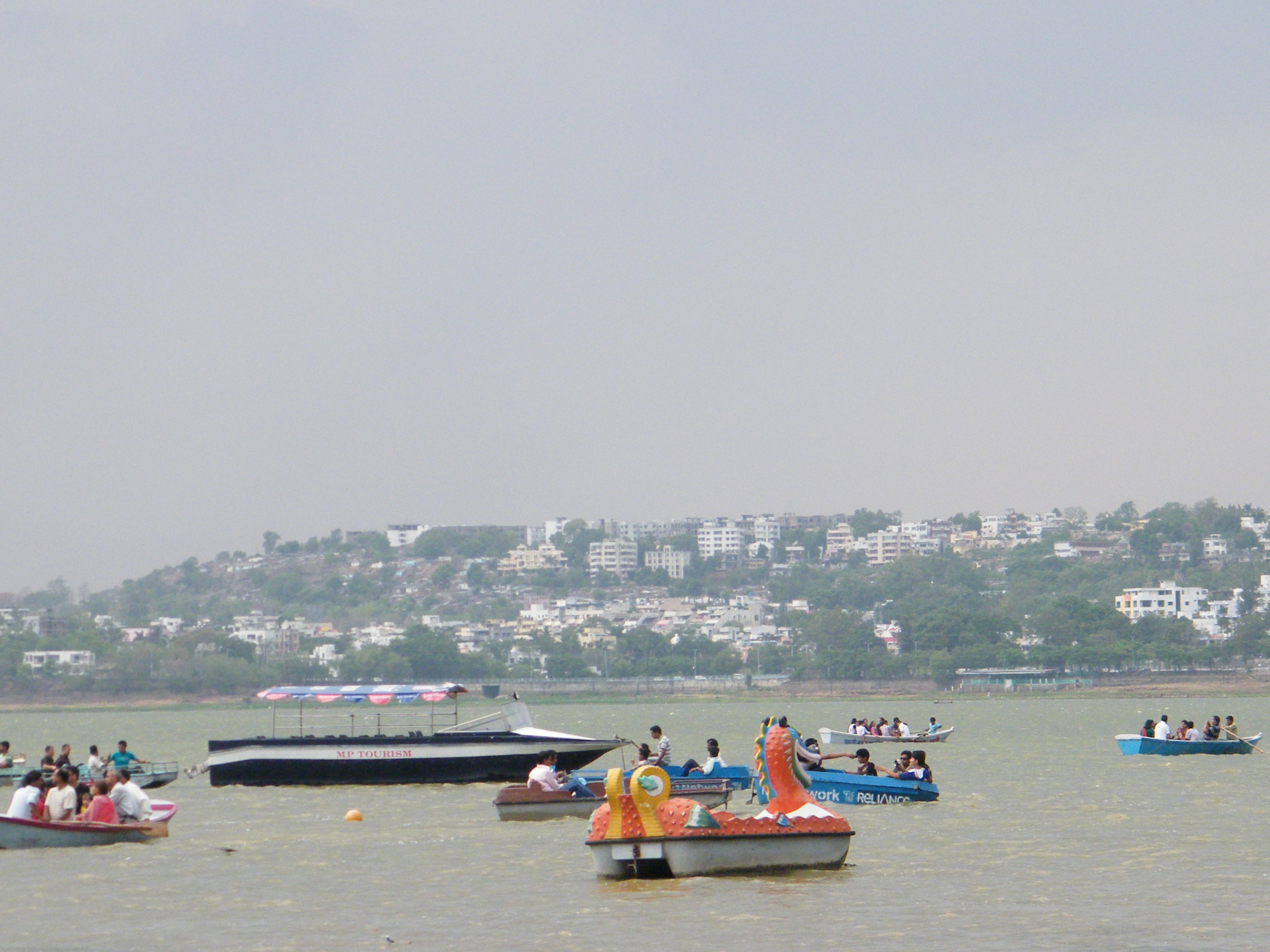
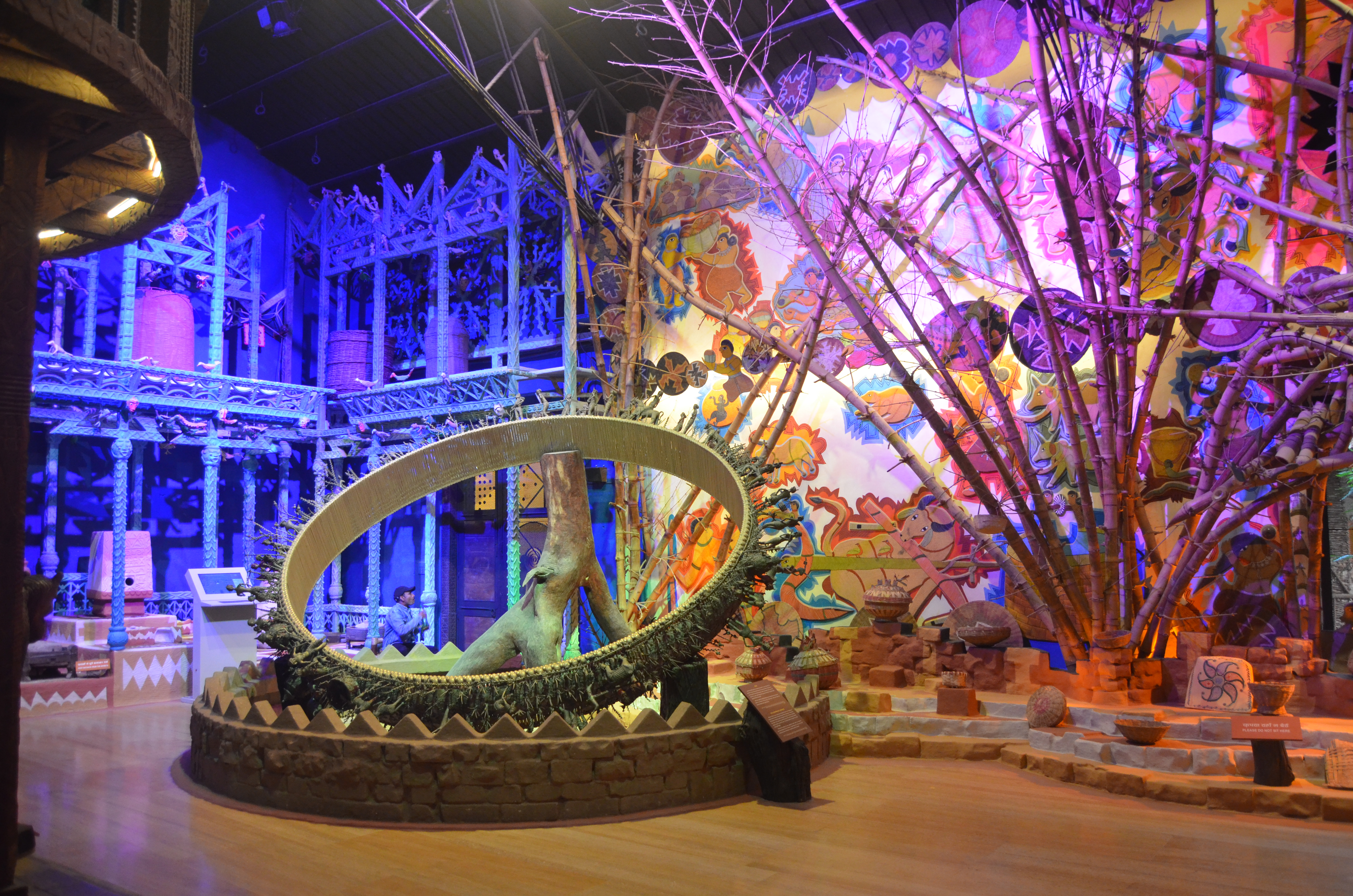
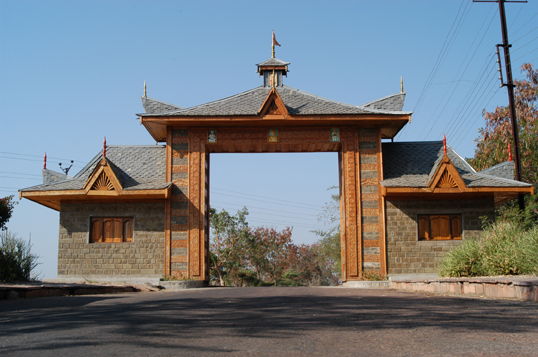
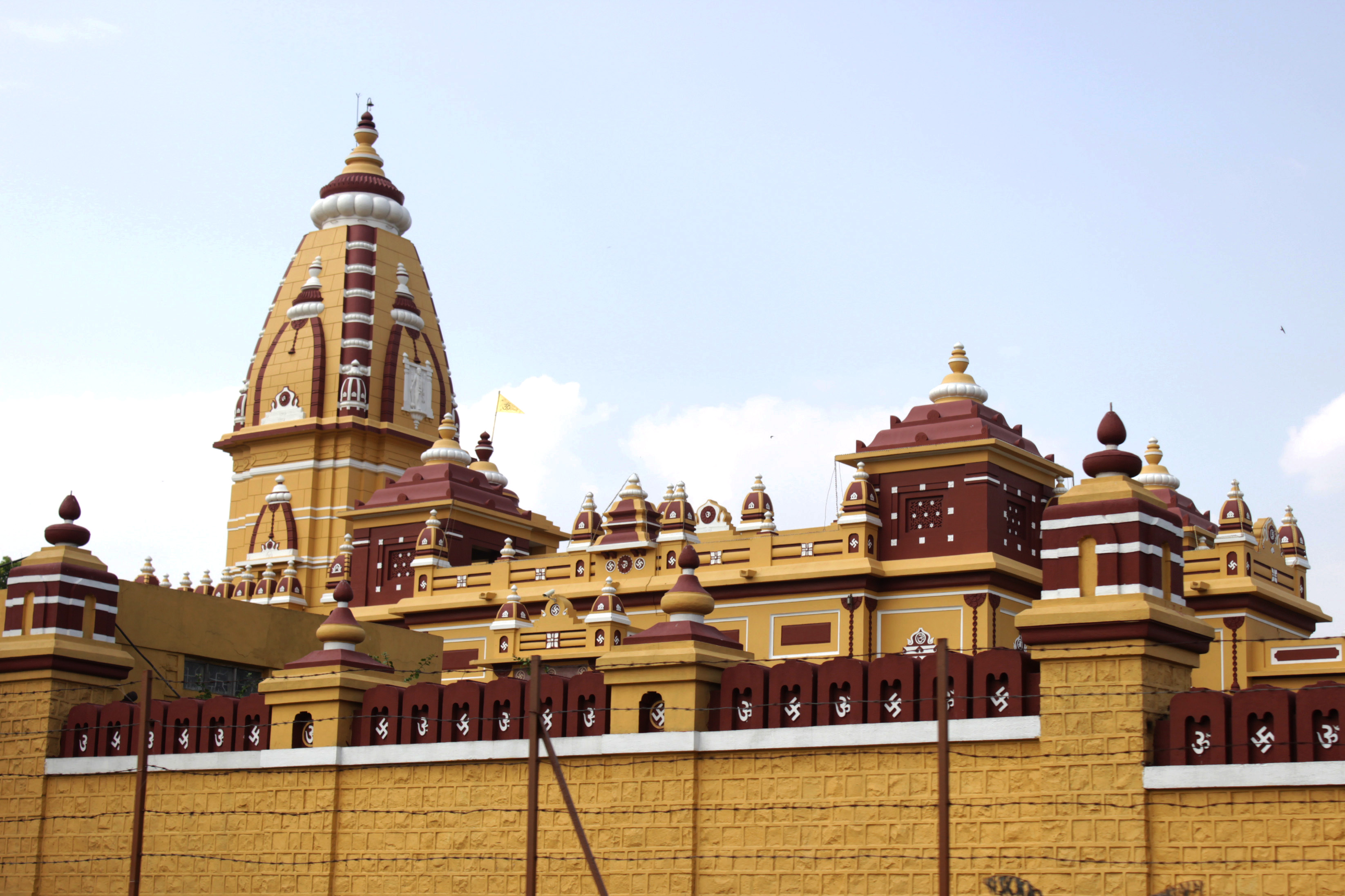
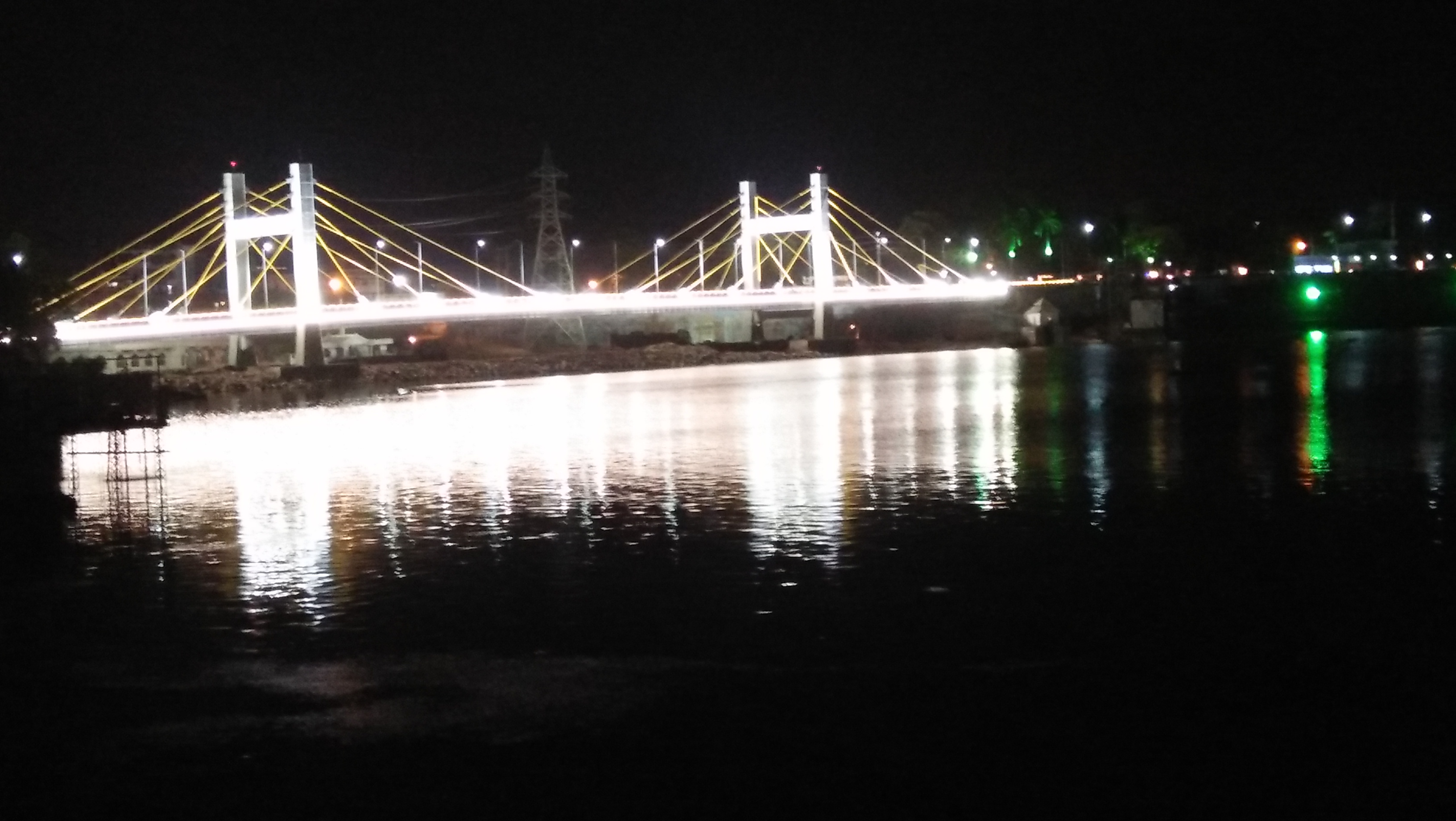
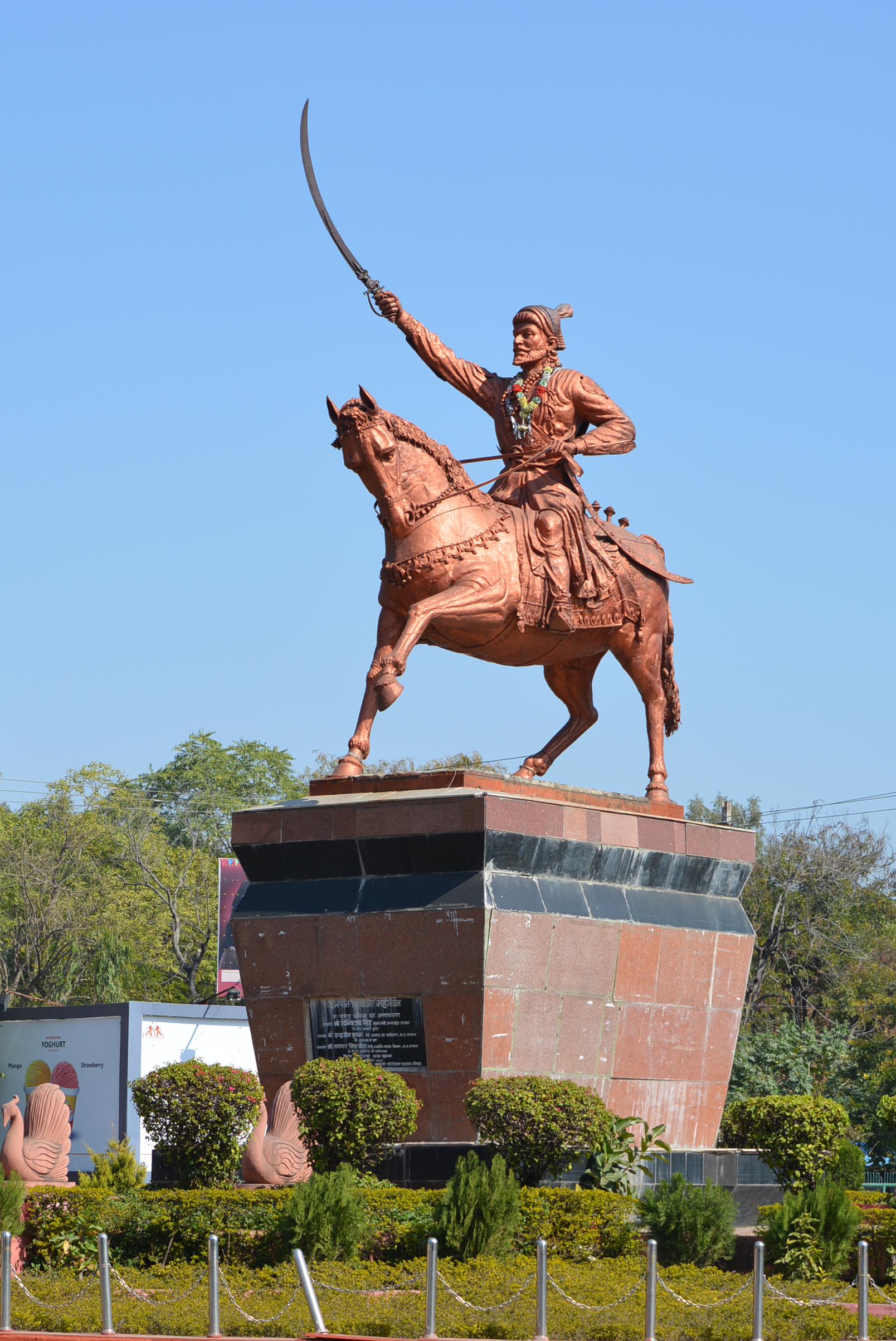
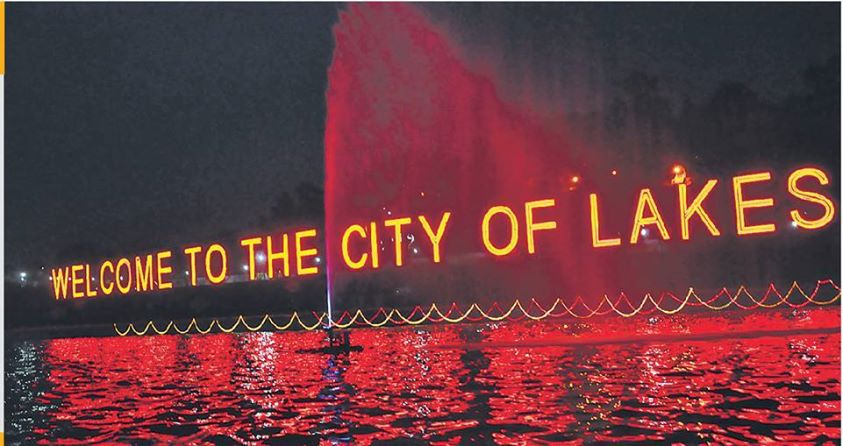
- New Market Rani Kamlapati Railway Station Upper Lake Tribal Museum Museum of Man Birla Mandir Raja Bhoj Setu Shivaji Nagar Lighting for The City of Lakes

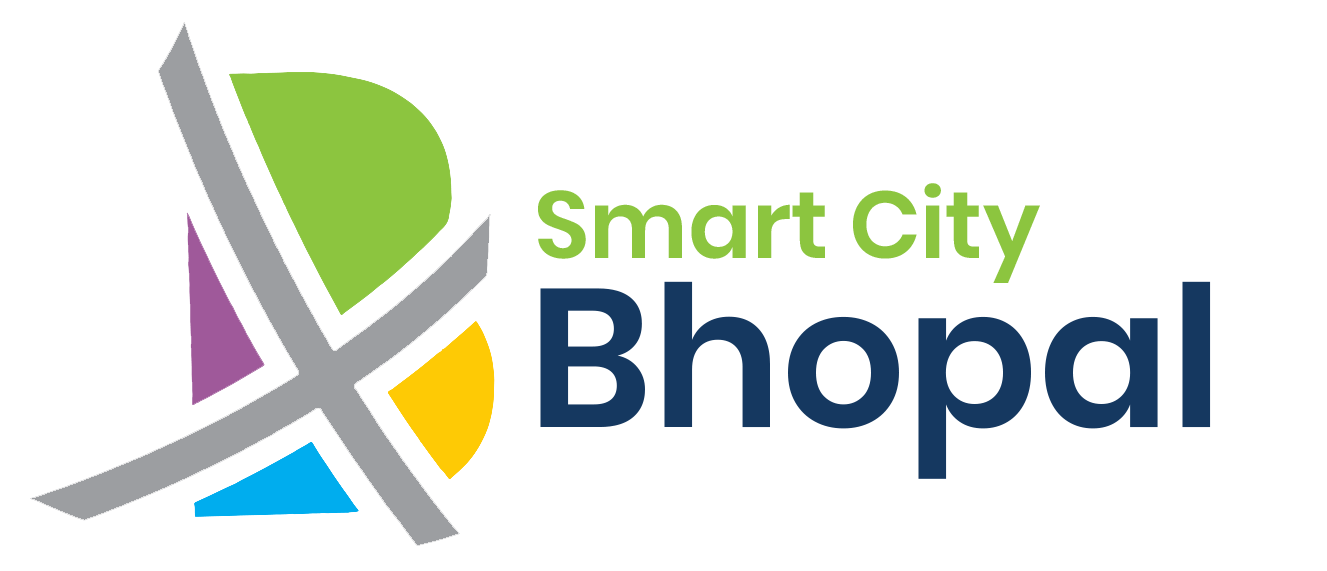
- Logo of Bhopal Smart City
- Nickname: The City of Lakes
- Location within Madhya Pradesh Location within India
- Coordinates: 23°15′32″N 77°24′45″E
- Country: India
- State: Madhya Pradesh
- District: Bhopal
- Region: Bhopal Division
- Ward: 85 wards
- Named for: Raja Bhoja

Government
  - Type: Mayor–Council
  - Body: Bhopal Municipal Corporation
  - Mayor: Malti Rai (BJP)
  - Member of Parliament: Alok Sharma (BJP)

Area
  - Metropolis: 463 km^{2} (179 sq mi)
  - Metro: 648.24 km^{2} (250.29 sq mi)
- Elevation: 518.73 m (1,701.9 ft)

Population (2011)
  - Metropolis: 1,798,218
  - Rank: 20th
  - Density: 3,880/km^{2} (10,100/sq mi)
  - Metro (Bhopal + Arera Colony + Berasia urban areas): 1,917,051
  - Metro density: 2,957.3/km^{2} (7,659.4/sq mi)
  - Metro rank: 18th
- Demonym: Bhopali
- Time zone: UTC+5:30 (IST)
- Pincode: 462001 to 462050
- Telephone: 0755
- Vehicle registration: MP-04
- Per capita GDP: $2,087 or ₹1.47 lakh
- GDP Nominal (Bhopal District): ₹44,175 crore (US$4.6 billion) (2020–21)
- Official language: Hindi
- Literacy Rate (2011): 80.37%
- Precipitation: 1,123.1 mm (44.22 in)
- Avg. high temperature: 31.7 °C (89.1 °F)
- Avg. low temperature: 18.6 °C (65.5 °F)
- HDI (2016): 0.77 (High)
- Website: bhopal.nic.in bhopal.city smartbhopal.city

Bhopal (Hindi: Bhōpāl, pronounced [bʱoːpaːl]) is the capital city of the Indian state of Madhya Pradesh and the administrative headquarters of both Bhopal district and Bhopal division. It is known as the City of Lakes, due to presence of various natural and artificial lakes near the city boundary. It is also one of the greenest cities in India. It is the 16th largest city in India and 131st in the world.

Flourishing around 1707, the city was the capital of the former Bhopal State, a princely state of the British ruled by the Nawabs of Bhopal until India's independence in 1947. Bhopal was one of the last states to sign the Instrument of Accession, and acceeded to the Indian government in 1949. Sindhi refugees from Pakistan were accommodated in Bairagarh, a western suburb of Bhopal. In 1956, Bhopal became the capital of the newly-formed Madhya Pradesh state. It was a part of the Sehore district until 1972, when the new Bhopal district was established.

Bhopal has a strong economic base with many large and medium industries. Bhopal, along with Indore, is a major financial and economic centre of Madhya Pradesh. Bhopal's GDP (nominal) was estimated at INR 44,175 crores (2020–21) by the Directorate of Economics and Statistics, Madhya Pradesh. A Y-class city, Bhopal houses various educational and research institutions and installations of national importance, including ISRO's Master Control Facility, BHEL and AMPRI. Bhopal is home to a large number of institutes of National Importance in India, namely, IISER, MANIT, SPA, AIIMS, NLIU, IIFM, NIFT, NIDMP and IIIT (currently functioning from a temporary campus inside MANIT). The city also has Regional Science Centre, Bhopal, one of the constituent units of the National Council of Science Museums (NCSM).

The city attracted international attention in December 1984 after the Bhopal disaster, when a Union Carbide pesticide manufacturing plant (now owned by Dow Chemical Company) leaked a mixture of deadly gases composed mainly of methyl isocyanate, leading to the worst industrial disaster in history. The Bhopal disaster continues to be a part of the socio-political debate and a logistical challenge for the people of Bhopal.

Bhopal was selected as one of the first twenty Indian cities (the first phase) to be developed as a smart city the Smart Cities Mission. Bhopal was also rated as the cleanest state capital city in India for three consecutive years, 2017, 2018, and 2019. Bhopal has also been awarded a 5-star Garbage Free City (GFC) rating, making it the cleanest State capital in the country in 2023.

== Etymology ==
According to folklore, Bhopal was founded in the 11th century by the Paramara king Bhoja, who ruled from his capital at Dhar. This theory states that Bhopal was originally known as Bhojpal after a dam (pal) constructed by the king's minister. An alternative theory says that the city is named after another king called Bhupala (or Bhupal). According to yet another version, Raja Bhoj suffered from leprosy. His physician advised him to build a lake with water from 365 rivers and take daily bath in it. When such a lake was built, it was called Bhoj Tal [or Bhoj's lake]. Gradually people started calling the city Bhojpal, and finally Bhopal.

== History ==
=== Early history ===
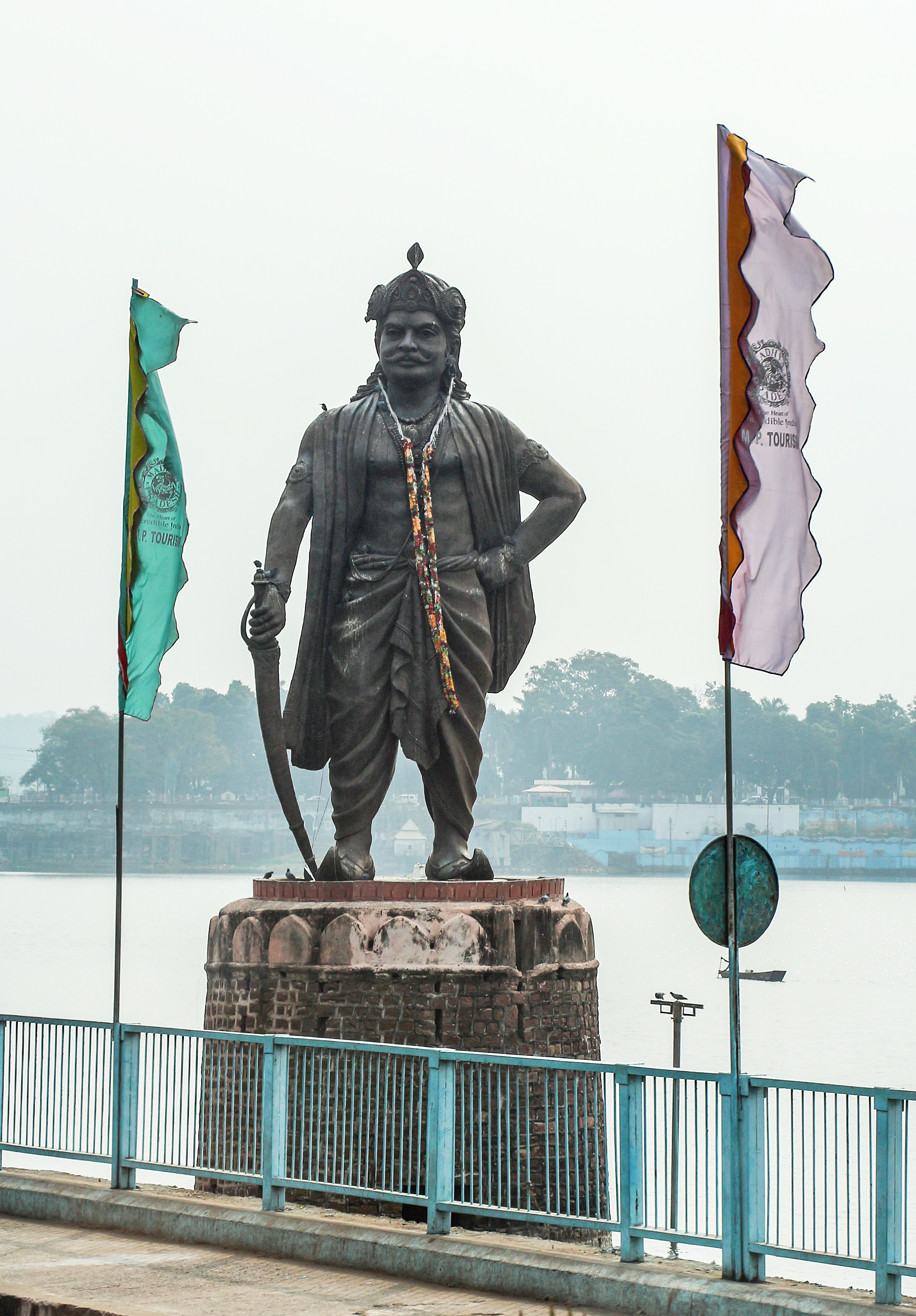
Bhopal was founded by and named after 11th-century Malwa king Bhoja

In the early 17th century, Bhopal was a small village in the Gond kingdom. The modern Bhopal city was established by Dost Mohammad Khan (1660–1726), a Pashtun soldier in the Mughal army. After the death of the emperor Aurangzeb, Khan started providing mercenary services to local chieftains in the politically unstable Malwa region. In 1709, he took on the lease of Berasia estate and later annexed several territories in the region to establish the Bhopal State. Khan received the territory of Bhopal from the Gond queen Kamlapati in lieu of payment for mercenary services and usurped her kingdom after her death. In the 1720s, he built the Fatehgarh fort in the village, which developed into the city of Bhopal over the next few decades.

=== Maratha rule (1737–1818) ===
The area of Malwa which also included Bhopal and nearby regions came under Maratha control after the combined armies of Mughal-Nizam-Nawab were decisively defeated in Battle of Bhopal (1737) by the great Peshwa Bajirao I.

=== Bhopal state (1707–1947) ===
The state was founded in 1707 by Dost Mohammad Khan, a Pashtun soldier in the Mughal army, who became a mercenary after the Emperor Aurangzeb's death and annexed several territories to his fiefdom. It came under the suzerainty of the Nizam of Hyderabad in 1723 shortly after its foundation. In 1737, the Marathas defeated the Mughals and the Nawab of Bhopal in the Battle of Bhopal, and started collecting tribute from the state.

Bhopal became a princely state after signing a treaty (During the reign of Nazar Mohammed Khan 1816–1819) with the British East India Company in 1818. Between 1819 and 1926, the state was ruled by four women, Begums – unique in the royalty of those days – under British suzerainty. Qudsia Begum was the first woman ruler (between 1819 and 1837), who was succeeded by her granddaughter, Shah Jehan. Between the years 1844–1860, when Shah Jehan was a child, her mother Sikandar (only daughter of Qudsia) ruled as regent. Curiously during the 1857 revolt, Sikandar supported the British, for which she was rewarded by proclaiming her as king in 1858. To give her further honour, she was given a 19-gun salute and the Grand Cross of the Star of India. The latter made her equivalent to a British person, who had been granted a knighthood. Thus she became, at that time, the only female knight in the entire British Empire besides Queen Victoria. Among the relatively minor rewards, a territory was restored to her, that she had earlier lost to a neighbouring prince.

Sikandar ruled until 1868, when Shah Jehan succeeded her and was Begum until 1901. In 1901, Shah Jehan's daughter Kaikhusrau Jahan became Begum, ruled until 1926, and was the last of the female line of succession. In 1926, she abdicated in favour of her son, Hamidullah Khan, who ruled until 1947, and was the last of the sovereign Nawabs. The rule of Begums gave the city its waterworks, railways, a postal system, and a municipality constituted in 1907.

=== Post independence ===
Bhopal State was the second-largest Muslim-ruled princely state: the first being Hyderabad. After the independence of India in 1947, the last Nawab expressed his wish to retain Bhopal as a separate unit. Agitations against the Nawab broke out in December 1948, leading to the arrest of prominent leaders including Shankar Dayal Sharma. Later, the political detainees were released, and the Nawab signed the agreement for Bhopal's merger with the Union of India on 30 April 1949. The Bhopal state was taken over by the Union Government of India on 1 June 1949.

=== Bhopal in 1984 ===
In early December 1984, a Union Carbide pesticide plant in Bhopal leaked around 32 tons of toxic gases, including methyl isocyanate (MIC) gas which led to the worst industrial disaster in the world to date.

The official death toll was initially recorded as around 4,000. A Madhya Pradesh government report stated 3,787 deaths, while other estimates state the fatalities were significantly higher (15,000) from the accident and the medical complications caused by the accident in the weeks and years that followed. The higher estimates have been challenged by Union Carbide, however, medical staff in the city were not able to adequately record data due to the massive influx of patients. The impact of the disaster continues to this day in terms of psychological and neurological disabilities, blindness, skin, vision, breathing, and birth disorders. Lawyers, academics and journalists have described the disaster as an ecocide.

The soil and ground water near the factory site have been contaminated by the toxic wastes. The Bhopal disaster continues to be the part of the socio-political debate; the clean-up of environmental contamination and rehabilitation of those affected continues to challenge the people of Bhopal.

The centre is seeking a direction to Union Carbide and other firms for ₹78.44 billion additional amount over and above the earlier settlement amount of US$470 million in 1989 for paying compensation to the gas tragedy victims.

The site of the industrial accident is rusting since the day of the disaster and has not been cleared off completely either by DOW Chemicals or government authorities; the site is still storing large quantities of lethal chemicals in underground tanks and overground storages.

== Geography ==
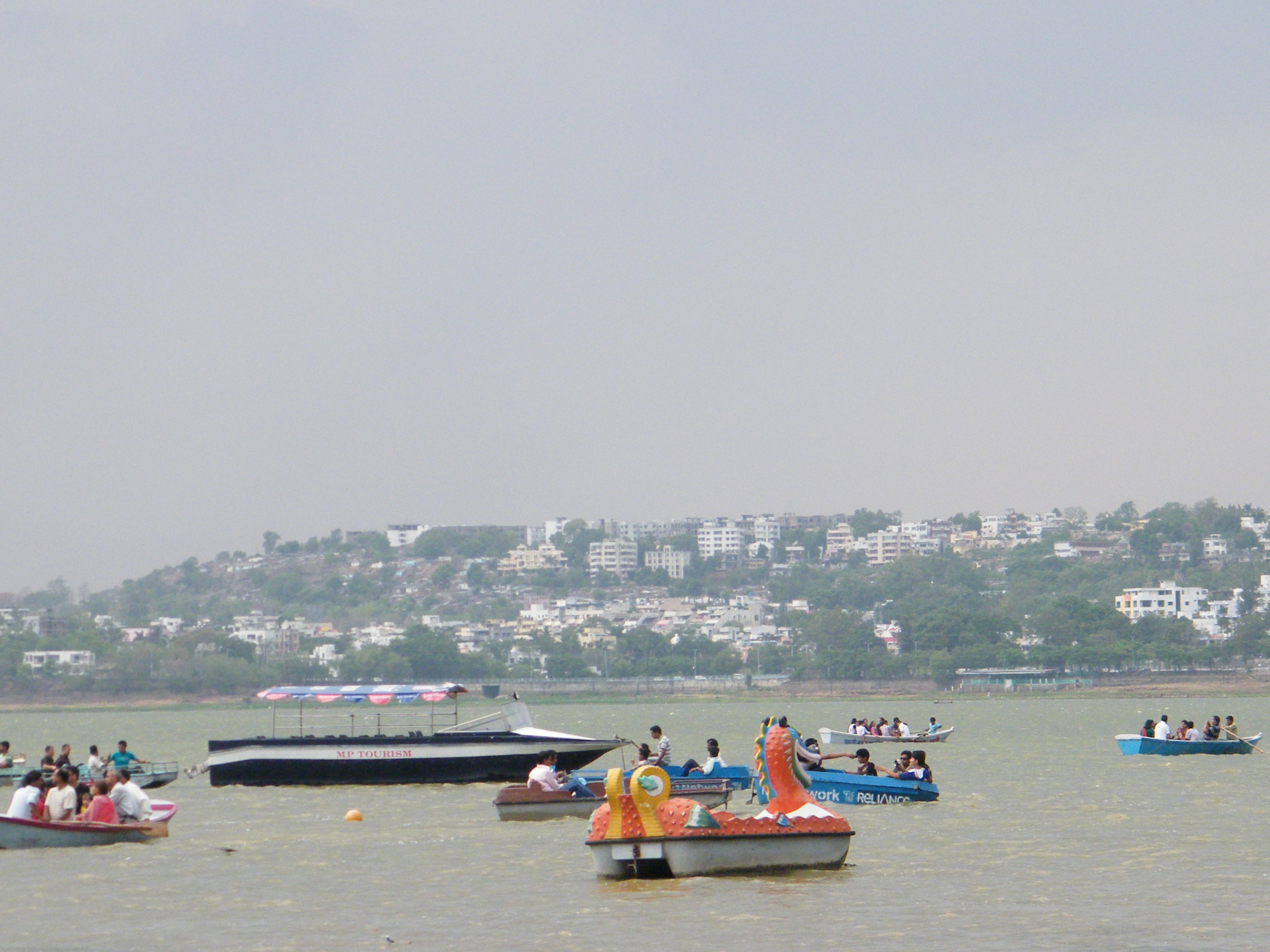
Boats in Bhojtal

Bhopal has an average elevation of 500 metres (1,401 ft) and is located in the central part of India, just north of the upper limit of the Vindhya mountain ranges. Located on the Malwa plateau, it is higher than the north Indian plains and the land rises towards the Vindhya Range to the south. The city has uneven elevation and has small hills within its boundaries. The prominent hills in Bhopal are the Idgah, Arera and Shyamala hills in the northern region, together with the Katara hills in the southern region. There are 17 lakes and 5 reservoirs biggest of them are upper lake (Bada Talab) and lower lake. The Upper Lake was built in the 11th century and has a surface area of 36 km^{2} and catchment area of 361 km^{2} while the Lower Lake has a surface area of 1.29 km^{2} and catchment area of 9.6 km^{2}. Recently, Bhopal Municipal Corporation came with a resolution to involve local citizens in cleaning, conserving and maintaining the lakes. Bhopal city is divided into two parts where one part which is near the VIP road and lake is Old Bhopal (north) and the other, New Bhopal (south), where malls are mainly situated. List of pin codes from Bhopal is 462001 to 462050 which comes under Bhopal postal division (Bhopal Region).

=== Climate ===
Bhopal

Climate chart (precipitation, max. and min. temperature)
J	F	M	A	M	J	J	A	S	O	N	D
13 24 9	7.8 28 11	7.2 34 17	4.5 38 22	8 41 26	114 37 25	356 31 23	388 29 22	196 31 21	26 32 18	14 29 12	12 25 10
- █ Average max. and min. temperatures in °C
- █ Precipitation totals in mm
Imperial conversion
J	F	M	A	M	J	J	A	S	O	N	D
0.5 76 49	0.3 83 53	0.3 92 63	0.2 101 71	0.3 105 78	4.5 99 78	14 87 74	15 84 72	7.7 87 71	1 90 65	0.5 84 54	0.5 78 50
- █ Average max. and min. temperatures in °F
- █ Precipitation totals in inches

Bhopal has a humid subtropical climate (Cwa), with cool, dry winters, a hot summer and a humid monsoon season. Summers start in late March and go on until mid-June, the average temperature being around 30 °C (86 °F), with the peak of summer in May, when the highs regularly exceed 40 °C (104 °F). Extreme high in May was 46.7 °C on 19 May 2016, and in June, it was 45.9 °C on 7 June 2019. The monsoon starts in late June and ends in late September. These months see about 40 inches (1020 mm) of precipitation, frequent thunderstorms and flooding. The average temperature is around 25 °C (77 °F) and the humidity is quite high. Temperatures rise again up to early November when winter starts, which lasts up to early March. Winters in Bhopal are cool, and not very much comfortable like summers, with average daily temperatures around 18 °C (64 °F). The winter peaks in January when temperatures may drop close to freezing on some nights. Lowest temperature ever recorded was 0.6 °C. Total annual rainfall is about 1101 mm (43.35 inches).

Climate data for Bhopal (Bairaghar) 1991–2020, extremes 1949–present
Month	Jan	Feb	Mar	Apr	May	Jun	Jul	Aug	Sep	Oct	Nov	Dec	Year
Record high °C (°F)	33.0 (91.4)	37.6 (99.7)	40.7 (105.3)	44.4 (111.9)	46.7 (116.1)	45.6 (114.1)	41.2 (106.2)	35.6 (96.1)	37.4 (99.3)	39.6 (103.3)	35.3 (95.5)	32.8 (91.0)	46.0 (114.8)
Mean daily maximum °C (°F)	24.9 (76.8)	28.4 (83.1)	33.9 (93.0)	38.7 (101.7)	41.1 (106.0)	37.4 (99.3)	30.9 (87.6)	28.9 (84.0)	31.3 (88.3)	32.7 (90.9)	29.9 (85.8)	26.7 (80.1)	32.1 (89.7)
Daily mean °C (°F)	17.6 (63.7)	21.0 (69.8)	26.0 (78.8)	30.8 (87.4)	34.0 (93.2)	31.0 (87.8)	26.9 (80.4)	25.7 (78.3)	26.6 (79.9)	25.8 (78.4)	22.3 (72.1)	18.7 (65.7)	25.5 (78.0)
Mean daily minimum °C (°F)	10.6 (51.1)	13.1 (55.6)	17.6 (63.7)	22.4 (72.3)	26.6 (79.9)	26.0 (78.8)	23.8 (74.8)	23.0 (73.4)	22.2 (72.0)	19.1 (66.4)	15.0 (59.0)	11.2 (52.2)	19.2 (66.6)
Record low °C (°F)	0.6 (33.1)	1.7 (35.1)	6.1 (43.0)	12.2 (54.0)	16.7 (62.1)	19.5 (67.1)	19.0 (66.2)	16.8 (62.2)	13.8 (56.8)	11.7 (53.1)	5.2 (41.4)	1.0 (33.8)	0.6 (33.1)
Average rainfall mm (inches)	11.3 (0.44)	9.4 (0.37)	8.8 (0.35)	6.5 (0.26)	14.2 (0.56)	132.8 (5.23)	367.7 (14.48)	326.0 (12.83)	175.6 (6.91)	31.5 (1.24)	8.7 (0.34)	8.5 (0.33)	1,101 (43.35)
Average rainy days	0.9	0.9	0.8	0.6	1.2	7.3	14.4	13.9	8.1	1.8	0.6	0.2	50.7
Average relative humidity (%) (at 17:30 IST)	42	33	24	19	22	46	74	79	66	45	43	43	45
Mean monthly sunshine hours	279.0	271.2	285.2	303.0	303.8	195.0	108.5	105.4	192.0	275.9	270.0	263.5	2,852.5
Mean daily sunshine hours	9.0	9.6	9.2	10.1	9.8	6.5	3.5	3.4	6.4	8.9	9.0	8.5	7.8
Source 1: India Meteorological Department (sun 1971–2000)
Source 2: Tokyo Climate Center (mean temperatures 1991–2020)

Bhopal has been ranked 6th best "National Clean Air City" (under Category 1 >10L Population cities) in India according to 'Swachh Vayu Survekshan 2024 Results'.

=== List of lakes ===
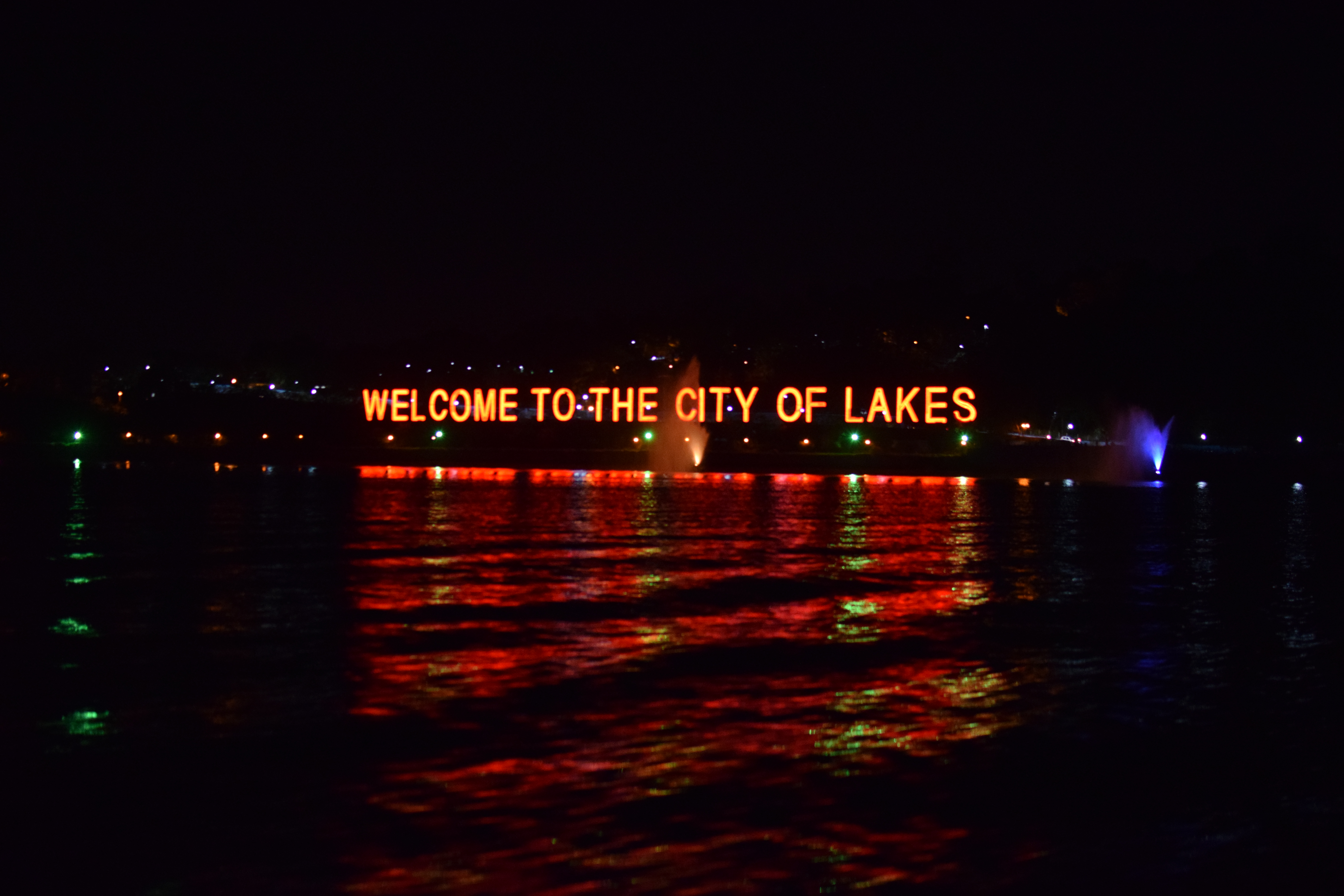
Lighting for The City of Lakes in Bhopal

1. Bhojtal (Bada Talaab/ Upper Lake)
2. Chhota Talaab (Lower Lake)
3. Shahpura Lake
4. Motia Talaab (at Taj-Ul-Masajid, Shahjehanbad)
5. Nawab Siddique Hasan Khan Talaab (First Step lake Below Motia Talaab)
6. Munshi Hussain Khan Talaab (Second Step lake Below Motia Talaab)
7. Lendiya Talaab (Ram Nagar Colony)
8. Sarangpani Lake (Piplani, BHEL area)
9. Manit Lotus Lake (Maulana Azad National Institute of Technology)
10. Jawahar Baal Udhyaan Lake (Ravishankar Nagar, Below Char Imli)
11. Bordi Kalan (Bhadbhada Road)
12. Preet Nagar Lake (Vidisha Bypass Road)
13. Nariyalkheda Golf Course Lake (SCEPTA Golf Course)
14. Laharpur Lake
15. Mullah Sarovar (Barkatullah University, Habibganj)
16. Nevri Talaab (Ajgar Talav near Sanjeev Nagar)
17. New Jail Pond (Ayodhya Bypass Road)
18. Bairagarh Visarjan Ghat (Sant Hirdaram Nagar)

=== List of reservoirs ===
1. Kolar Dam
2. Kerwa Dam
3. Kaliyasot Dam
4. Halali Dam
5. Bhadbhada Dam
6. Hathaikheda Dam

== Demographics ==
Religion in Bhopal City (2011)
Religion	Percent
Hinduism	69.20%
Islam	26.28%
Jainism	1.35%
Christianity	1.12%
Buddhism	1.08%
Others†	0.6%
Population % by religion; †Includes Sikhs

According to the 2011 census, the population of the Bhopal city (the area under Bhopal Municipal Corporation) is 1,798,218, with 936,168 males and 862,050 females. The population of the Bhopal metropolitan area (the urban agglomeration that extends beyond Bhopal city) was 1,886,100 in 2011. The total effective literacy rate (for population aged 7+ years) was 85.24%, with male and female literacy respectively at 89.2% and 80.1%.

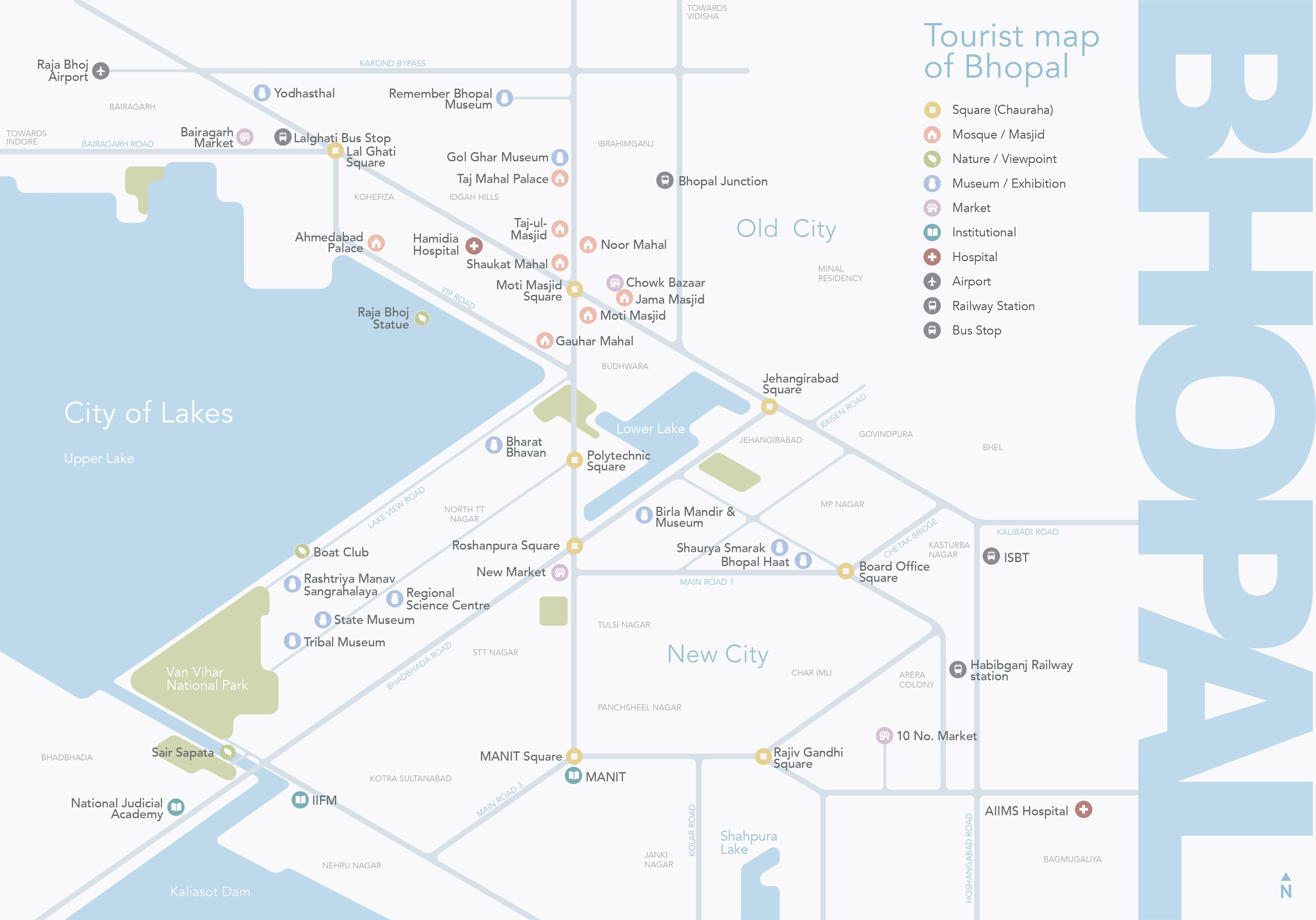
Tourist Map of Bhopal

Languages of Bhopal city (2011)
1. Hindi (81.2%)
2. Urdu (8.53%)
3. Marathi (2.99%)
4. Sindhi (2.91%)
5. Others (4.33%)

== Government and politics ==
Bhopal is the name of the division, as well as the district and the capital city of state. The division is headed by the commissioner and additional commissioner for the division. The division has five districts, of which Bhopal is one. Bhopal district administration is headed by the District Magistrate of Bhopal, who is the chief executive officer for the district.

The city is represented in the parliament by Bhopal Lok Sabha constituency, with Alok Sharma from the BJP elected in the 2024 Indian General Election. Bhopal also houses the State Legislative Assembly, or the Vidhan Sabha, which seats 230 members of Legislative Assembly. The sixteenth (and current) Vidhan Sabha was elected in December 2023. As of June 2024, the party in the majority in Vidhan Sabha is Bhartiya Janata Party (BJP) with 165 seats which is led by Mohan Yadav. Bhopal district elects 7 seats to the Assembly, and as per delimitation in 2008, Bhopal city is represented in 6 constituencies:

State assembly constituency	Wards	Councillor	Political party
Bhopal Uttara	5–18, 22	Arif Aqueel	Indian National Congress
Narela	39–42, 46, 56–58, 66	Vishvas Sarang	Bhartiya Janata Party
Bhopal Dakshin-Paschim	26–35, 48–49	PC Sharma	Indian National Congress
Bhopal Madhya	19–21, 23–25, 36–38, 43–45, 47–50, 50–52	Arif Masood	Indian National Congress
Govindpura	53–55, 59–63, 65	Krishna Gaur	Bhartiya Janata Party
Huzur	1–4	Rameshwar Sharma	Bhartiya Janata Party

It is also part of the larger urban agglomeration of Bhopal, with a population of 1,883,381. The first municipal body that governed the municipal population of the city came into being in 1907 in erstwhile Bhopal estate, and was called Majlis-e-intezamia". The first city survey was conducted in 1916 after the enactment of Municipal act. Till 1956, the area under Bhopal Municipal limit was very small, after which surrounding villages were added to it. By 1975, the municipal limit reached 71.23 square km. Bhopal Municipal Council got the status of Municipal Corporation, with total of 56 wards in 1983.

=== Civic administration ===
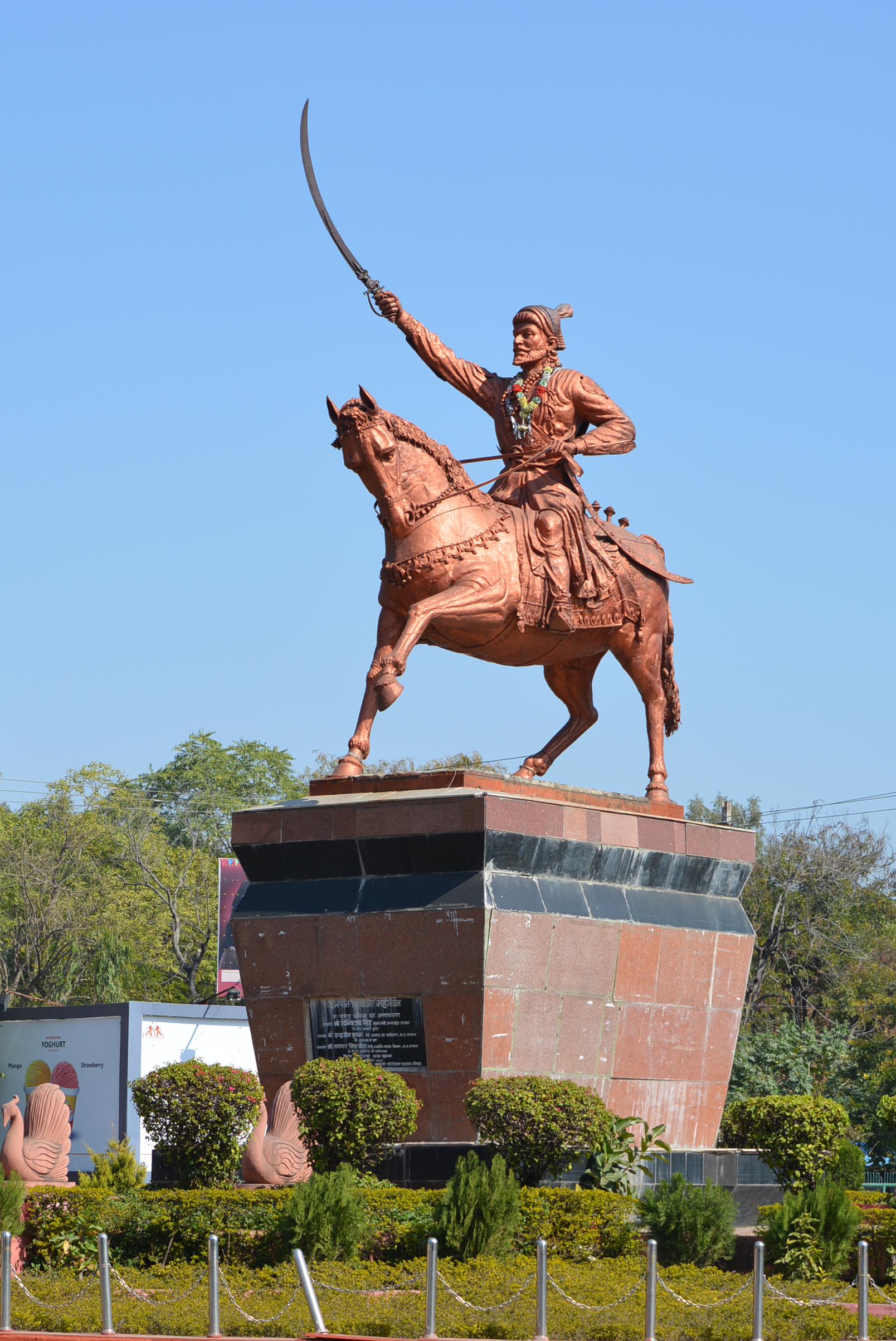
Shivaji statue at Shivaji Nagar Square Bhopal

Bhopal Municipal Corporation (BMC) is the urban civic body which oversees the needs of Bhopal city. The municipal corporation follows guidelines under the Madhya Pradesh Municipal Corporation Act, 1956, as well as the Madhya Pradesh Municipalities Act, 1961. In 2015, Kolar Municipal Corporation merged with it, after having been split from it earlier. In 2019, it was announced that the corporation would be split again and a proposal was put forth to the urban administration and housing department, which was criticised by the mayor-in-council. It also proposed for indirect election of the mayor.

The municipal corporation is spread over an area of 463 km^{2} (179 sq mi) and has a population of 17,95,648. The city is divided into 14 zones and 85 wards for the purpose of administration, and each ward is represented by a councillor elected for a term of five years. The winning party elects a council of members, who are responsible for various departments. Ward committees as well as Mohalla committees have been prescribed by the corporation act. In October 2016, the Pioneer reported the meeting of one ward committee in the city. Madhya Pradesh is one of the few states in India, which uses the Mayor-in-Council (MIC) system and hence the elected representatives of the Bhopal Municipal Corporation are also organised as MIC.

Elections held for 85 wards of Bhopal Municipal Corporation on 6 July 2022. As of September 2020, the reservation of wards has been decided. The present mayor of the city is Malti Rai. In 2019, the state government changed the rules that had applied since 1988, allowing the mayor to be indirectly elected, by elected councillors. V.S.Choudhary Kolsani is the municipal commissioner of the city. Additional municipal commissioner is Shashwant Singh Meena.

The municipality receives income from tax collection, assigned revenue, rental income, fees and user charges, revenue grants, income from investment funds. The budget for the year 2020–21 has been approved as ₹2,495 crore.

=== Municipal finance ===
According to financial data published on the CityFinance Portal of the Ministry of Housing and Urban Affairs, the Bhopal Municipal Corporation reported total revenue receipts of ₹1,154 crore (US$139 million) and total expenditure of ₹1,051 crore (US$127 million) in 2022–23. Tax revenue accounted for about 29.8% of the total revenue, while the corporation received ₹224 crore in grants during the financial year.

=== Civic utilities ===
Bhopal Development Authority is the apex body for planning and co-ordination of development activities in the Mandhya Pradesh, which consists of Bhopal and its influence area, and was set up in 1976 under the Bhopal Development Authority Act, 1974.

Electricity in Bhopal is distributed by the Madhya Pradesh Madhya Kshetra Vidyut Vitaran Company Limited, the central discom of the state. It is regulated by the state electricity board, the Madhya Pradesh State Electricity Board (MPSEB), which is located in Bhopal. Fire services are provided by the Bhopal Municipal Corporation.

Bhopal Municipal Corporation is responsible for planning, constructing and maintaining the water supply system within the city. Natural sources of water are surface water (upper lake, kolar reservoir, narmada river), with a significant portion of the population depending on ground water (tubewells, handpumps) as well as privately owned and unaccounted for dugwells and borewells. According to a study done in 2014, piped water supply in the city covers about 6% of the population; however, irregular and bad quality of water supply is a common complaint in the city.

The system of solid waste disposal in urban areas is governed by the municipality under the Municipal Solid Wastes (Management and Handling) Rules 2000. These rules have been framed under the Environment Protection Act, 1986. The city of Bhopal generates 900 tonnes of solid waste. As of 2018, only 1.5% of this waste is segregated. While the municipality website states that door-to-door collection was started by BMC at each zone and ward level from 15 August 2013, Free Press Journal has reported in 2020 that the civic body has failed in the same. Bhopal has 8 transfer stations, where the garbage collected zone wise is dumped, and without any segregation, the waste is transferred to the Adampur Chhawni landfill site. In 2018, after the National Green Tribunal (NGT) directed the BMC to clean dump at Bhanpur, which activists claim is 80 feet high and has polluted ground water up to 500 metres below, the trenching ground was shifted to Adampur. In 2019, it was announced that India's first e-waste clinic was being set up in Bhopal. BMC along with Central Pollution Control Board came together to establish this clinic which will enable segregation, processing and disposal of waste, both residential and commercial. In January 2020, the clinic was inaugurated for operations. It started initially as a three-month pilot and if the pilot is successful, the clinics will be opened in other places as well.

As of 2017, the city of Bhopal produces 310 MLD of sewage per day, of which only 50 MLD is treated in the 7 Sewage treatment plants that have a capacity of 80 MLD. Most of the sewage reaches water bodies, the Upper and Lower Lake, Motia Lake, Siddique Hasan Lake, Munshi Hussain Khan Lake. There are about 800 large drains in Bhopal. About 80% sewerage water mixes with storm water drains main drains include Patra, Mandi and Hataikheda, Jatkhedi.

After a gap of 25 years, the state capital's masterplan 2031 was finally released in March 2020 by the Directorate of Town and Country Planning, Madhya Pradesh. The previous masterplan of 1995 was valid until 2005; and Bhopal had no masterplan between 2005 and 2020. Bhopal Municipal Corporation was ranked 3rd out of 21 Cities for best governance and administrative practices in India in 2014. It scored 3.7 on 10 compared to the national average of 3.3.

== Culture ==
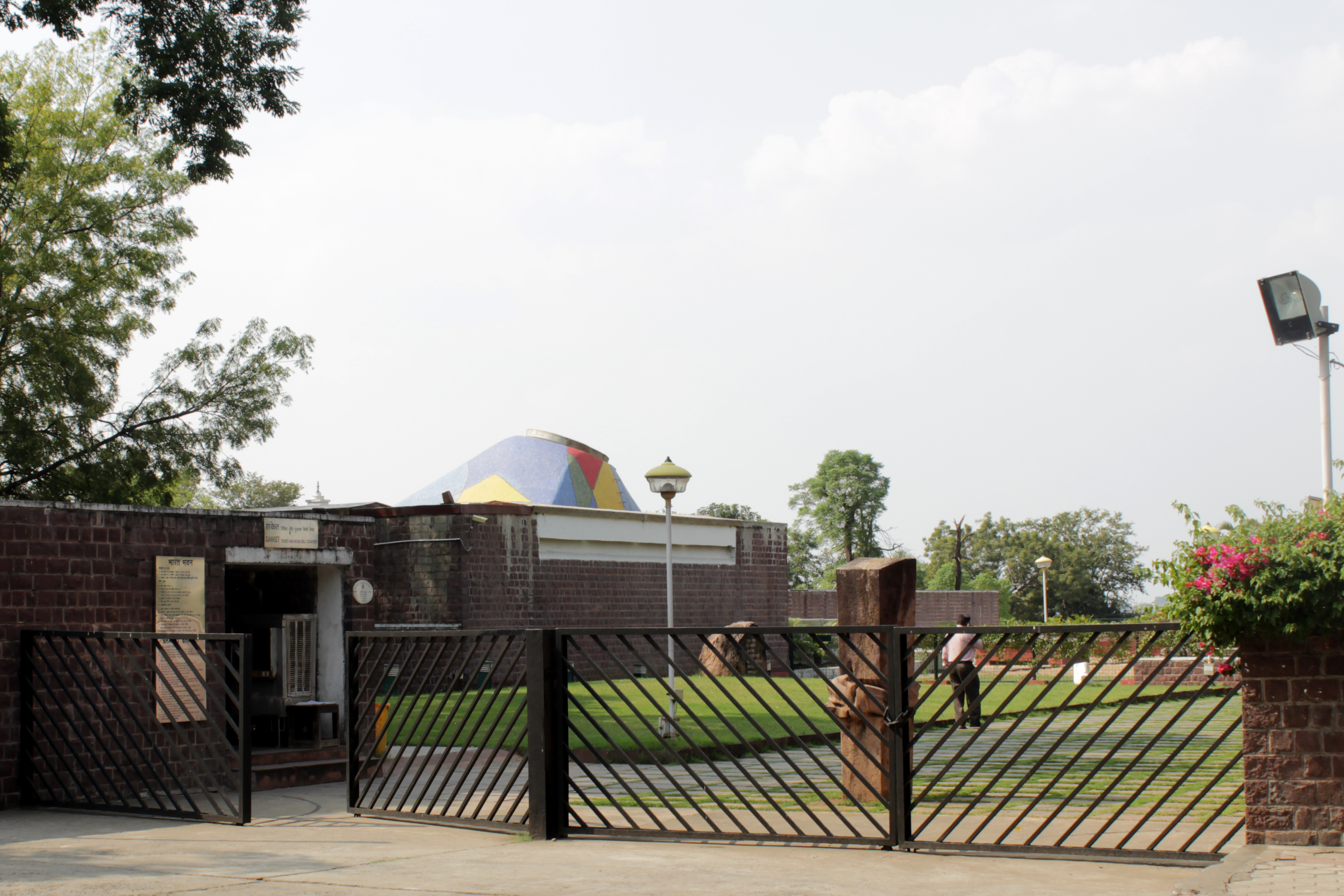
Bharat Bhavan Bhopal

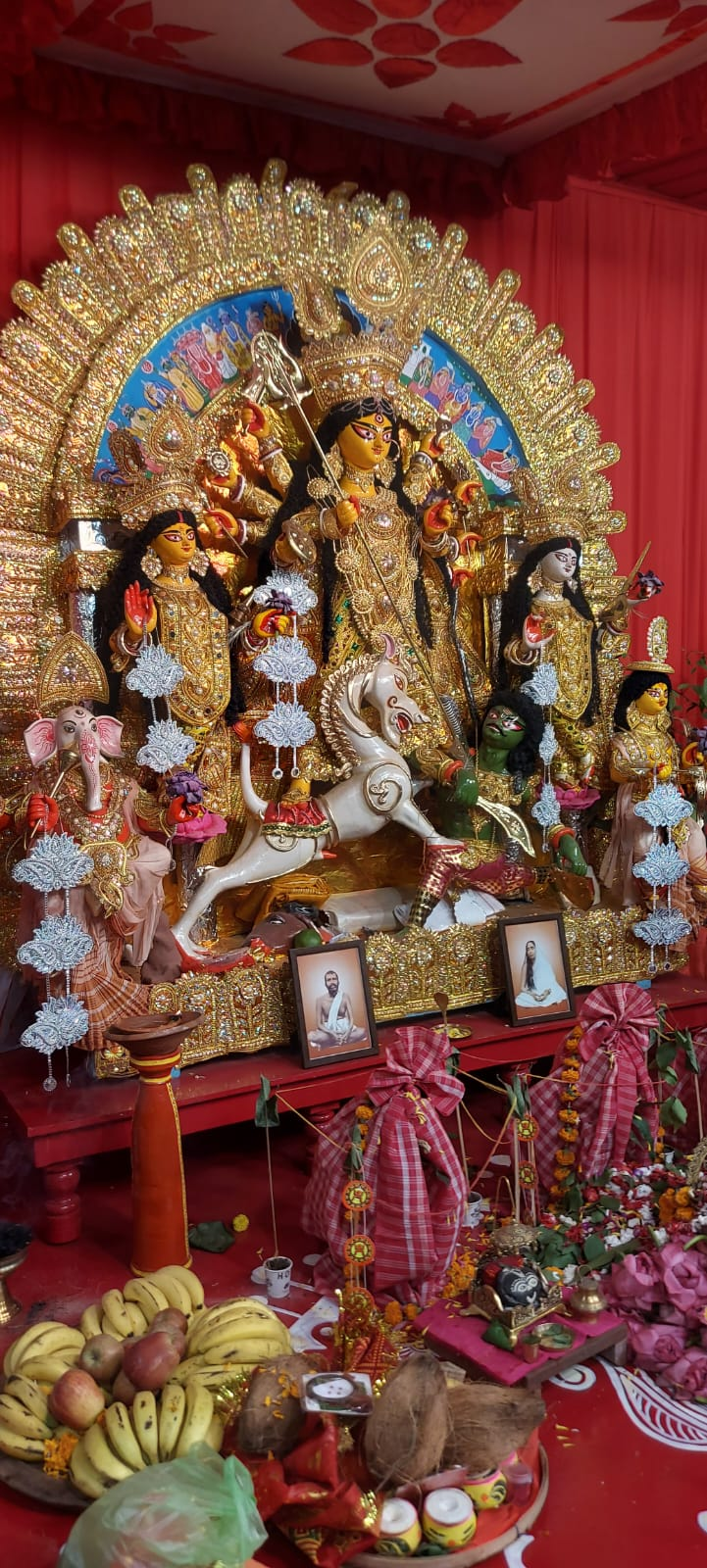
Durga Puja

Diwali is a major festival in Bhopal. Gifts and sweets are exchanged and donation are made to the poor. Diwali is celebrated by worshiping the wealth goddess Lakshmi. During Ganesh puja and Durga Puja (Navratras), idols of Ganesh and Durga are established in jhankis throughout the city. People throng to offer prayers to their deities. At the end of Navratras, on the day of Vijayadashami (or Dussehra), huge effigies of Ravan are burnt in different parts of the city. Apart from jhankis, annual Durga puja is conducted in a huge way where large idols of mother goddess and pandals are installed and bhog is served. Several cultural programmes and other pujas like Kalipuja, Saraswati puja etc are also conducted. These festivals are majorly celebrated by the Bengali diaspora of Bhopal, the largest association being The Bengali Association, T.T. Nagar, Bhopal.

Eid is also a major festival in Bhopal. Bhopal Ijtema is an annual Muslim world preachers congregation, is held at Eint khedi, 11 km from Bhopal. The annual congregation near Bhopal attracts between 5,00,000 and 10,00,000 Muslims globally.

=== Architecture ===
The Nawabs of Bhopal built several structures including the Taj-ul-Masajid and Taj Mahal palace in Indo-Islamic and European styles.

Bharat Bhavan is the main cultural centre of the city, and hosts many theatre and film festivals every year. It has an art gallery, an open-air amphitheatre facing the Upper Lake, two other theatres and a tribal museum. The Bharat Bhavan as well as the MP Legislative Assembly were designed by Charles Correa.

== Economy ==
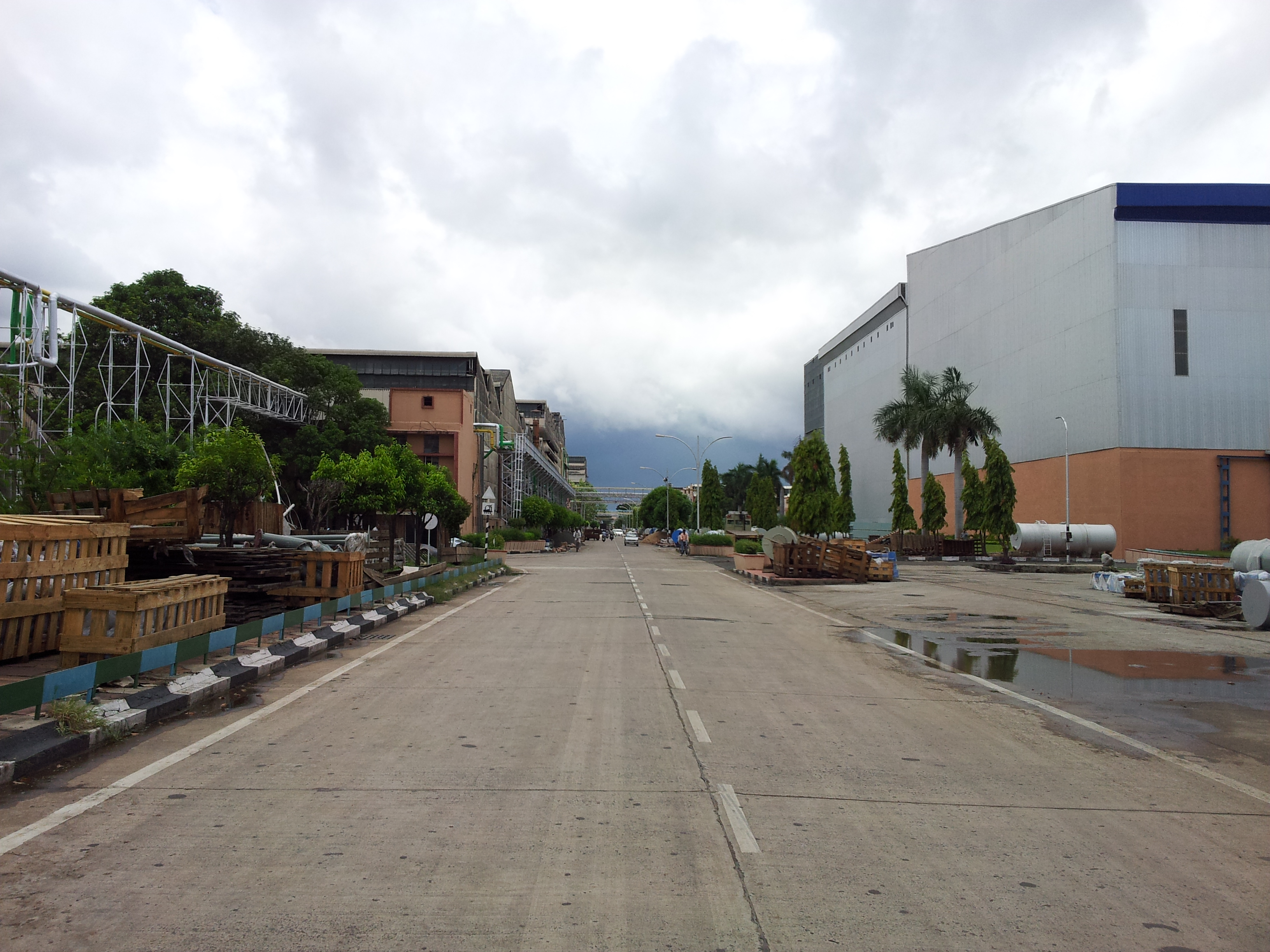
BHEL Bhopal plant during monsoons.

Nominal GDP of Bhopal District was ₹44,175 crores for the year 2020–21 with a per-capita GDP of ₹1,40,729 as per the Directorate of Economics and Statistics (Madhya Pradesh).

Bhopal's economy is primarily industrial and includes the manufacturing of pharmaceuticals, automobiles, textiles, jewellery, and electronics. Other industries include cotton and flour milling, cloth weaving and painting, as well as making matches, sealing wax, and sporting equipment. The residents of Bhopal also engage in large retail businesses. Handicrafts, like zardozi and batua (a small string purse, usually used with Indian traditional dresses) are some of the products of the Old City.

Bhopal is also home to the DB Corp, informally called the Bhaskar Group (named after its major publication Dainik Bhaskar), a ₹17 billion business conglomerate with a strong presence in media. Its head office is located in Maharana Pratap Nagar. While an IT Park, near Bhopal Airport, houses various software development companies and the city is expected to further enlarge its IT presence in near future with giants like WIPRO intending to establish software development centre in the city.

Manjul Publishing House, located in the old city, is a major publishing house made famous by the translation of the Harry Potter series of novels into Hindi.

=== Industries ===
- Bharat Heavy Electricals Limited, the largest engineering and manufacturing enterprise in India, has a unit in Bhopal. It occupies a large area in the Eastern Part of the city and maintains a suburb named after it. A majority of the residents of the BHEL Suburb are employed by the unit. Govindpura Industrial Area is a huge industrial zone situated in northern limits of the city.
- Mandideep is an industrial suburb of Bhopal. It is located to the south of the city on the NH 12. Manufacturing units in Mandideep include HEG Limited, Procter & Gamble, Lupin Limited, Eicher Tractors, Insulators and Electricals Limited, Tafe Motors And Tractors Limited, B. S. Engineering Works, etc.
- Rapidly transforming industrial zones near Bhopal also include Bagroda AKVN, Tamot Plastic Park and Acharpura Industrial Area. With the state government providing conducive environment for setting up of manufacturing units, the industrial zones have seen exponential demand from the investors to purchase the land which are provided at heavily subsidised prices.
- Bhopal also has in its vicinity Badiyakhedi Industrial Area (Sehore), Pilukhedi Industrial Area (Rajgarh), Budhni Industrial Area (Sehore), Jamuniya Khejda (Raisen) and Mohasa Babai Industrial Area (Narmadapuram). The industrial areas have attracted huge investments with companies like Welspun Corp. Ltd, Vardhaman Industries, Trident Group, Lapp India, and Inox Air Products Pvt. Ltd. already operating manufacturing plants in various industrial belts.

=== Upcoming projects ===
Bhopal also has many other mega projects lined up in its vicinity. In March 2022, Madhya Pradesh government announced the development of Bagroda Industrial Area Phase-2 after observing the immense interest of investors to set up manufacturing units near Bhopal. The government has also decided to develop Berasia Industrial Area in Bhopal district, a site close to Jaipur-Bhopal Highway and Delhi-Gwalior-Bhopal Highway.

In the sphere of IT development, a mega skill park with a total investment of more than ₹1,500 crores is being built in the eastern portion of the city. The Global Skills Park, Bhopal is a highly touted project of the Central and the state government which is being funded by the Asian Development Bank (ADB). The Park is expected to be fully commissioned at the end of 2023. While the IT Park near Bhopal Airport is eying investments of software companies including TCS and Wipro. IT startups of the city are already functioning in this area.

Bhopal is set to be a crucial intermediate city under the recently announced Delhi-Nagpur industrial corridor. While a multi-modal logistics park has been proposed to take shape near Mandideep. NHAI has already prepared DPR for the upcoming ring road project between Obaidullaganj and Sehore with a cost of around ₹720 crores.

== Transport ==
=== Air ===
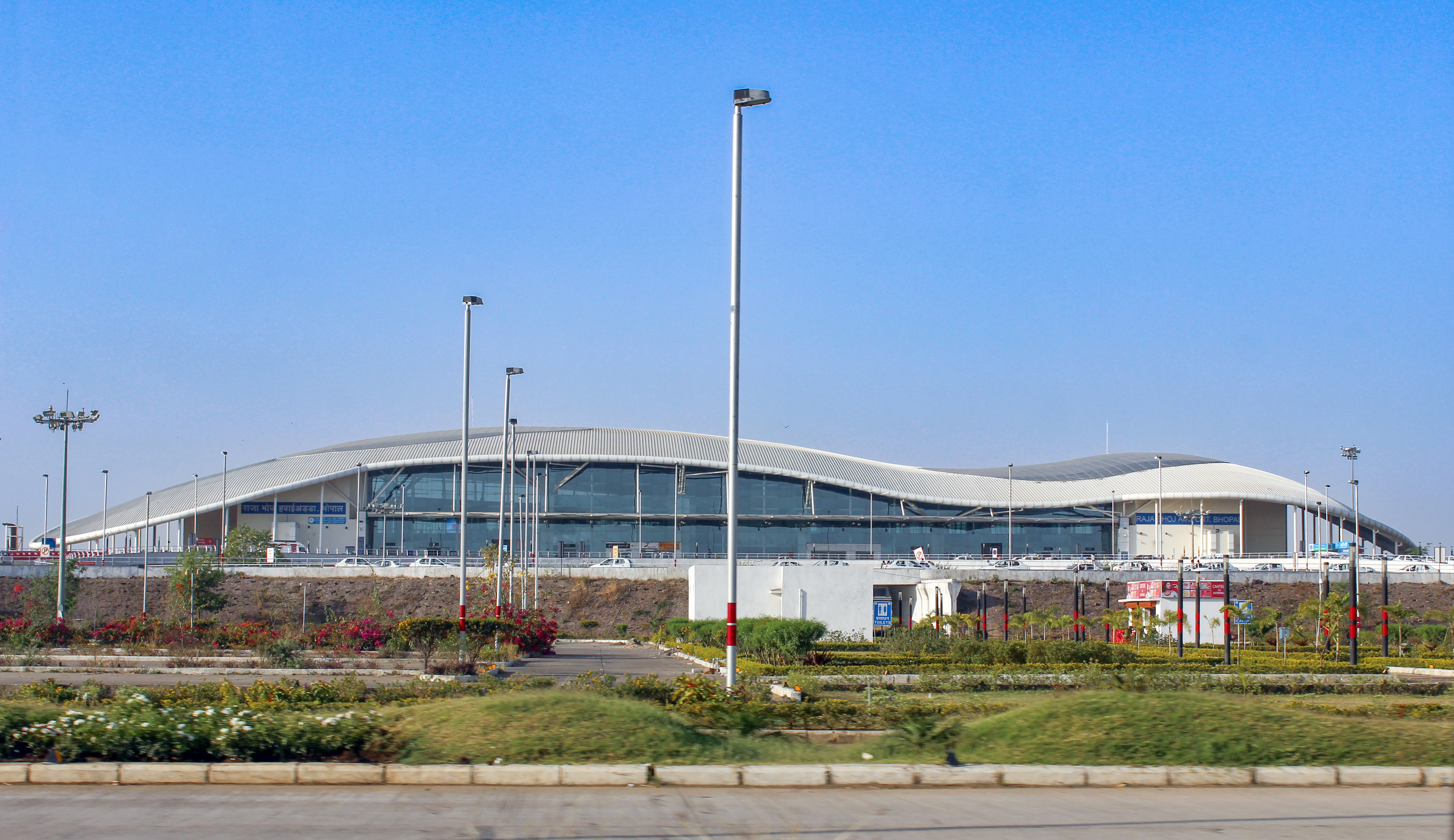
Raja Bhoj International Airport

The Raja Bhoj International Airport is located near the suburb of Bairagarh (formerly known as Sant Hirdaram Nagar) and is the primary airport serving the state of Madhya Pradesh.

There are three routes or ways to reach the airport: Bairagad, Panchvati, or Gandhi Nagar road (N.H 12). From within the city, VIP Road, a four-lane road takes one to the airport, which lies 15 km to the north of the city. International flights began operations in 2010. Air India, SpiceJet and Indigo operate domestic direct flight services. As of April 2023, Bhopal has non-stop flights to New Delhi, Mumbai, Jaipur, Ahmedabad, Udaipur, Bangalore, Hyderabad, Mopa, Agra, Prayagraj and Raipur. There are no international flights from Bhopal.

=== Roads ===
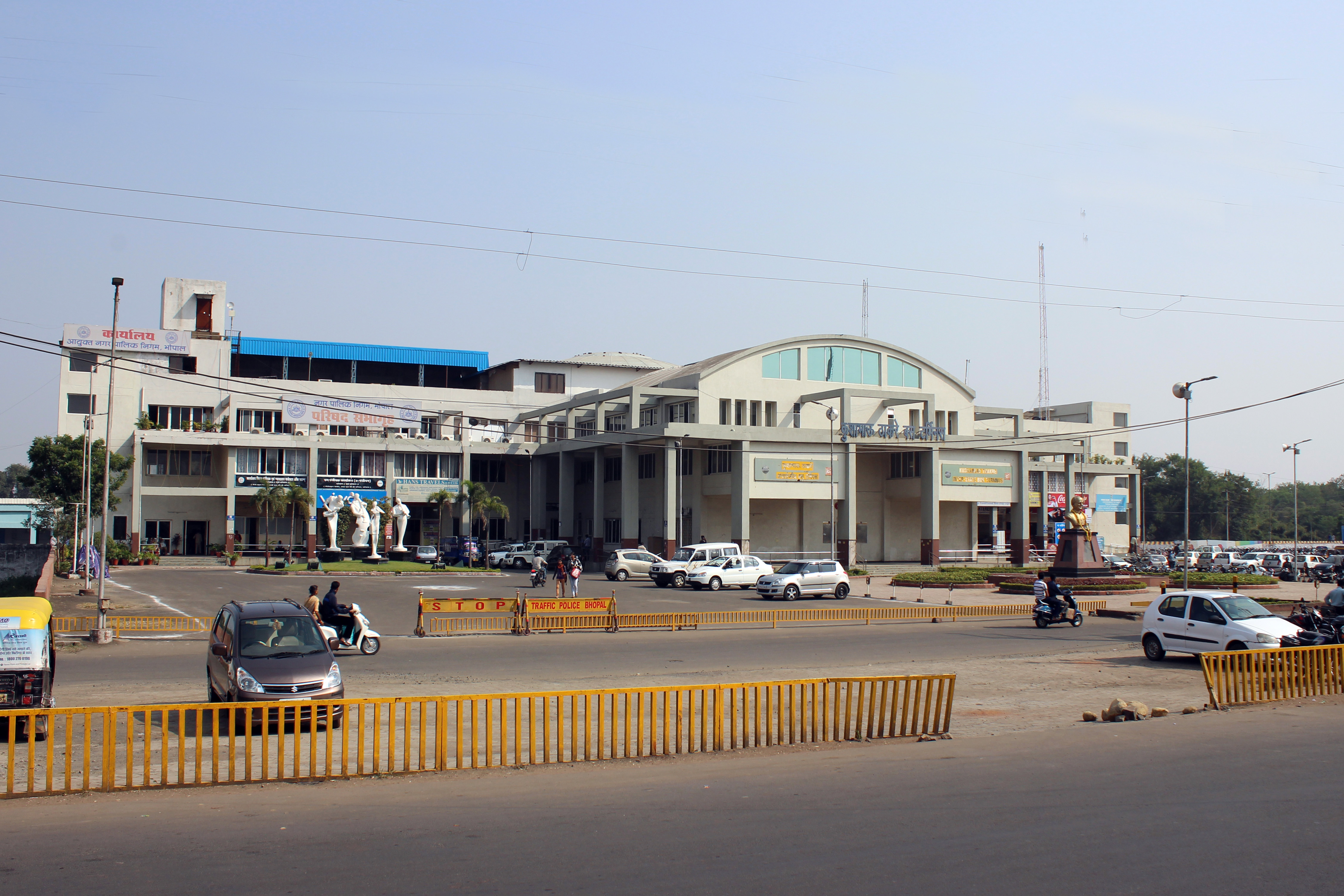
Kushabhau Thakre ISBT Bhopal

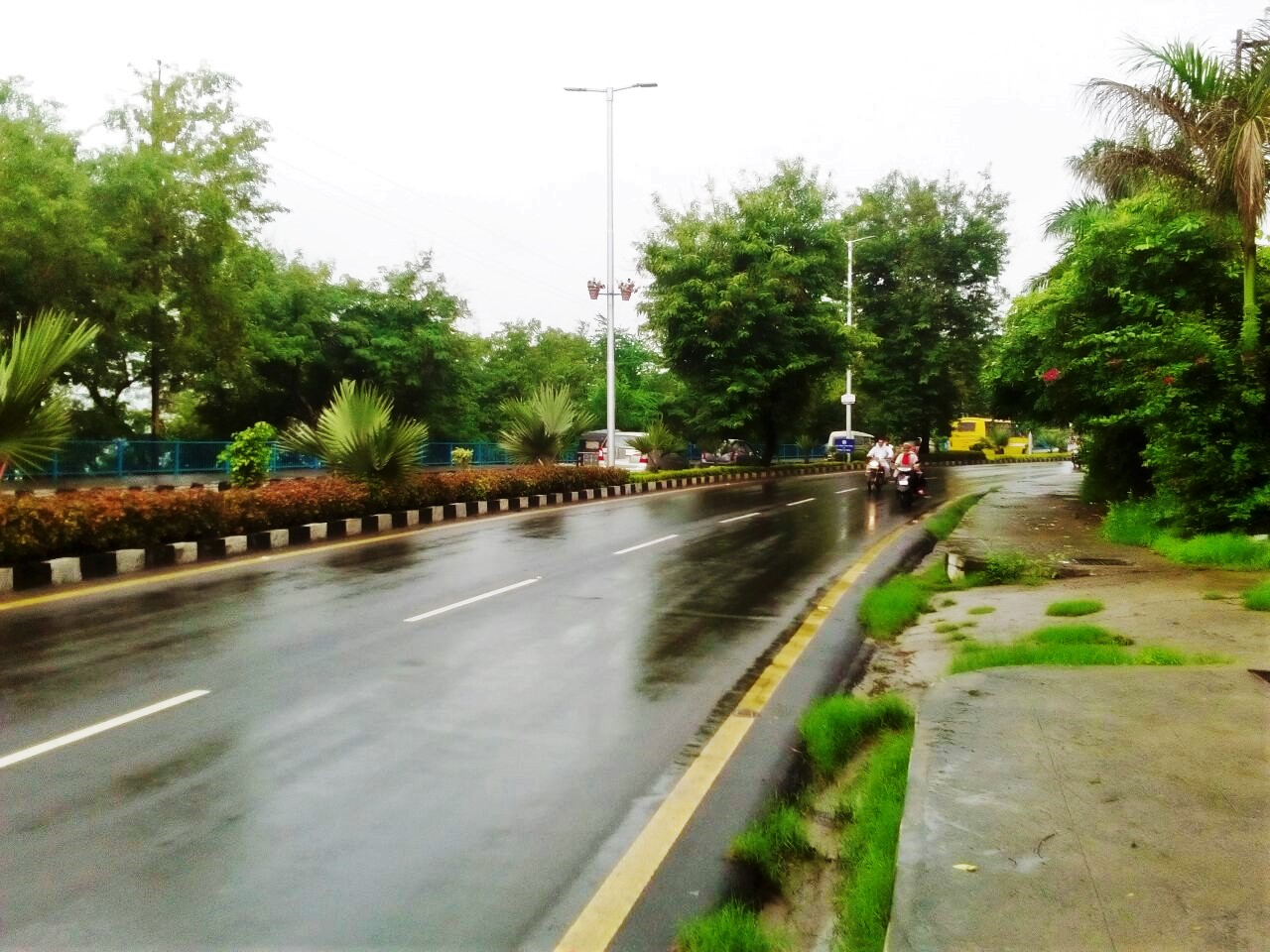
Bhopal VIP road

National Highway 46 forms a ring-road around Bhopal which connects it to Jabalpur in the East (via NH 45) and Jaipur to the North west. NH 146, a branch of NH 46, connects the city to Vidisha, Sagar and Kanpur in the North east. State Highway 18 connects the city with Indore (with Sehore and Dewas on the way). State Highway 23 connects the city to Guna and Berasia in the north.

An interstate bus terminus was inaugurated in 2011, the Kushabhau Thakre Inter State Bus Terminal is located near the Habibganj railway station.

In 2025, a $2.3 million bridge project was constructed with a sharp, nearly 90-degree angle rectangular turn, leading seven engineers involved to be suspended and the construction firms blacklisted. The unusual design was due to disputes over how to share the land the bridge was constructed on.

=== Rail ===
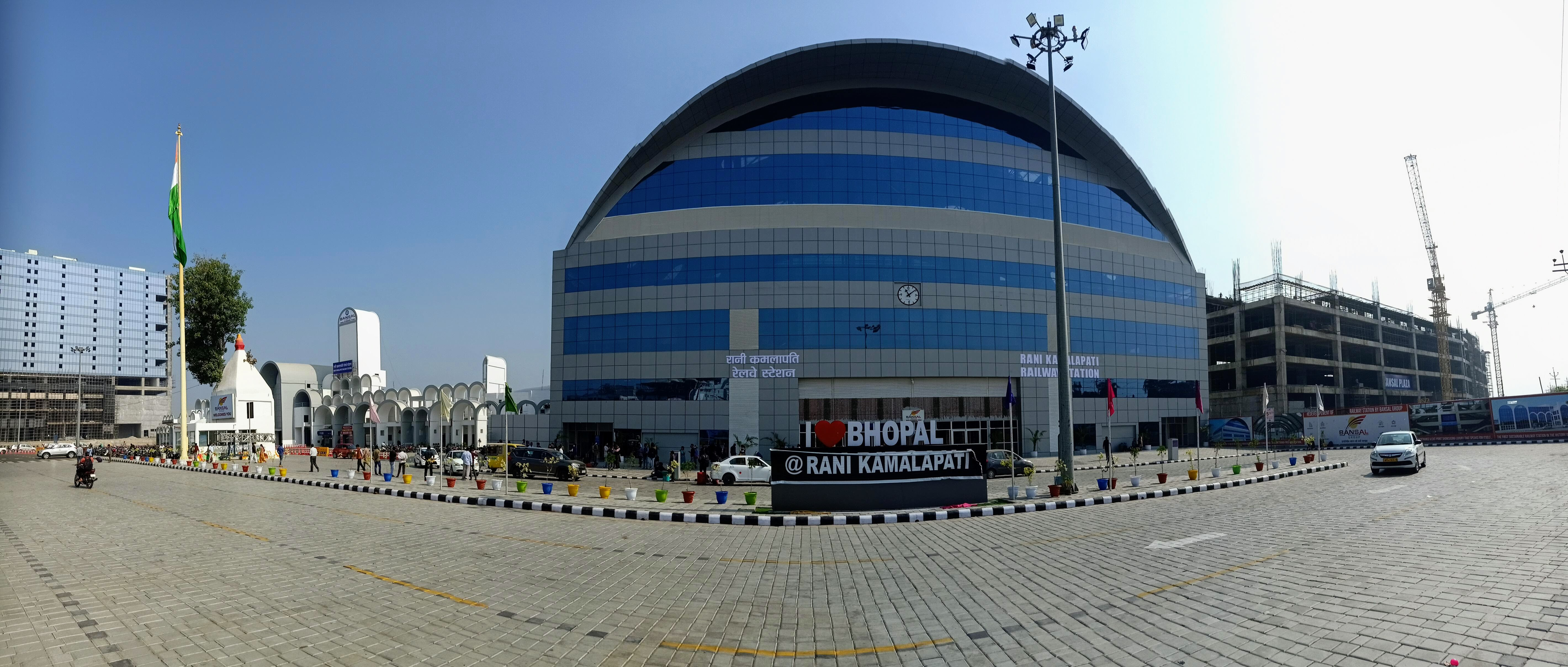
Old (left) and new (centre) main entrance buildings of Habibganj railway station (officially Rani Kamalapati station)

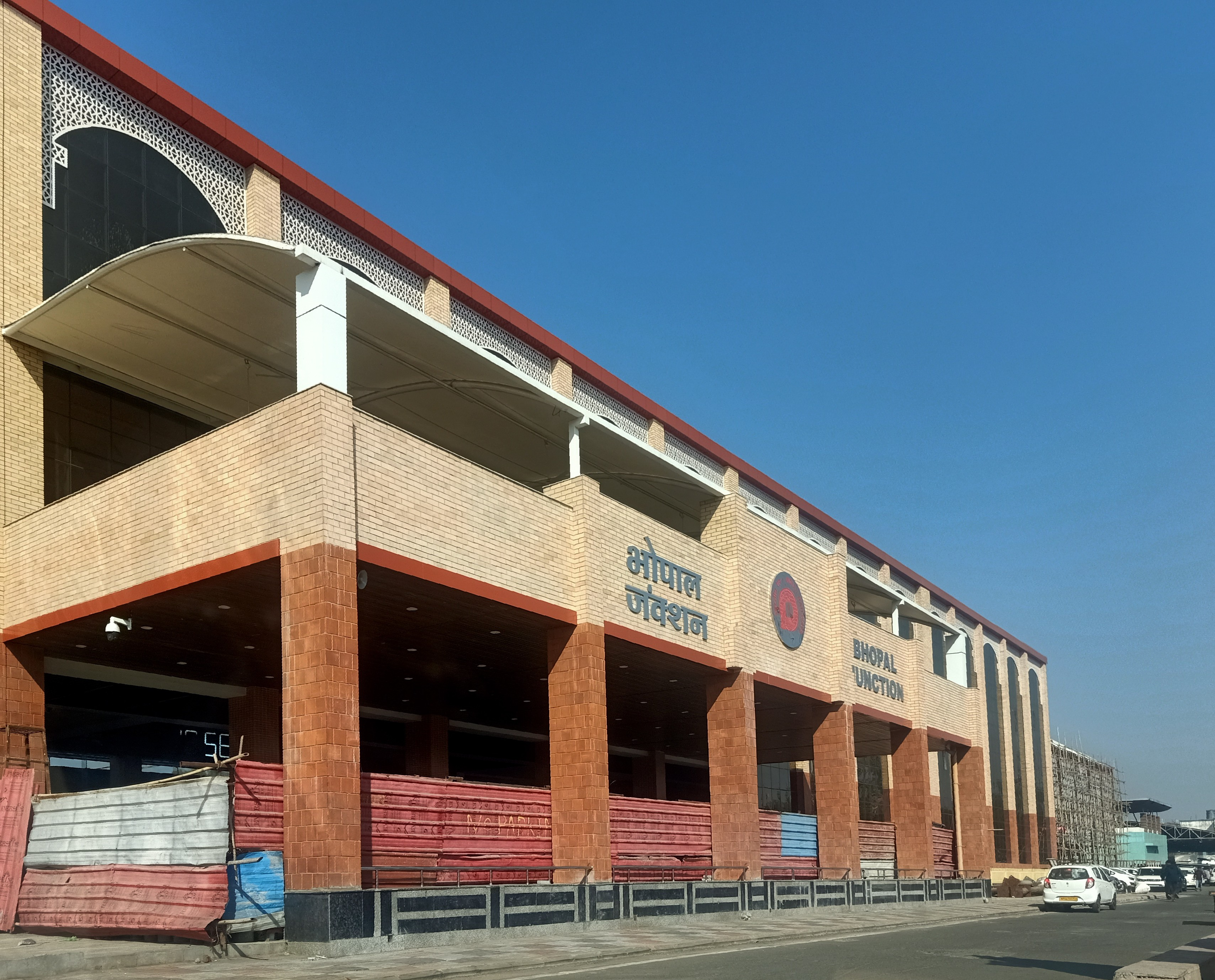
View of Bhopal Junction railway station

Railways started in Bhopal in 1884 when the Bhopal–Itarsi section of New Delhi–Chennai main line was opened.

Bhopal Junction railway station was opened in 1884 and is a junction station on the Delhi–Chennai line and Ujjain–Bhopal section. A total of 234 trains halt/originate/terminate at the station daily. Another station within Bhopal's urban limits is Habibganj railway station (Rani Kamalapati railway station) on the Delhi–Chennai line. It is India's first private railway station and also is promoted as first world-class railway station of India. A total of 108 trains halt/originate/terminate at the station daily. Other stations within urban limits are Sant Hirdaram Nagar railway station, Misrod railway station and Nishatpura railway station.

The divisional railway manager's office of Bhopal railway division is situated adjacent to Habibganj railway station. The division falls under West Central Railway zone of Indian Railways.

=== Urban transport ===
==== Bhopal BRTS ====
The Bus Rapid Transit System, which opened in 2013, is run by Bhopal City Link Limited (BCLL). The company has identified 4 trunk and 8 standard routes in the city on which 225 buses would be operated daily from 05:00 to 23:00. 82 bus stops are built along the 24 km long corridor.

On 26 December 2023, following a meeting at the state secretariat, the Government of Madhya Pradesh led by Chief Minister Mohan Yadav made the decision to discontinue the BRTS project. The reason cited for the decision was the traffic problems arising due to the corridor.

==== Metro Rail ====
The first stage of a heavy-rail metro system named Bhoj Metro commenced operations on 21 December 2025.

== Education ==
=== Basic education ===
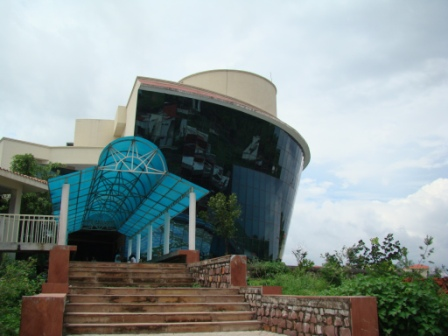
National Law Institute University

Bhopal has more than 550 state-sponsored schools, most of which are affiliated to the Madhya Pradesh Board of Secondary Education (MPBSE). In addition, there are five Kendriya Vidyalayas in the city. The city is also served by numerous other private schools affiliated to either CBSE, ICSE, MPBSE, NIOS and CIE (Cambridge).

Notable schools include Delhi Public School, Bhopal (CBSE), The Sanskaar Valley School (ICSE & Cambridge International Examinations), Carmel Convent School (CBSE), Campion School (CBSE), and St. Joseph's Convent (CBSE).

=== Higher education ===
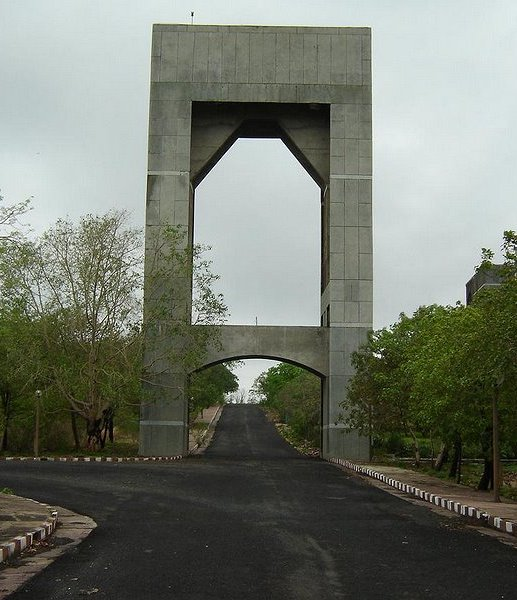
IIFM arc

The institutes and universities headquartered in the city include:

Institute	Founded
National Law Institute University	1997
AcSIR in CSIR AMPRI	2011
Gandhi Medical College	1955
Maulana Azad National Institute of Technology	1960
National Institute of Design, Madhya Pradesh	2019
Barkatullah University	1970
Indian Institute of Forest Management	1982
Madhya Pradesh Bhoj Open University	1991
Rajiv Gandhi Proudyogiki Vishwavidyalaya	1998
Makhanlal Chaturvedi National University of Journalism and Communication	1990
National Judicial Academy	1993
Indian Institute of Science Education and Research, Bhopal	2008
National Institute of Fashion Technology	2008
School Of Planning And Architecture	2008
VIT Bhopal	2017
All India Institute of Medical Science	2012
Jagran Lakecity University	2013
Indian Institute of Information Technology	2017
RKDF University	2012
Rabindranath Tagore University	2010

=== Research institutes ===
Bhopal offer a number of Research institutes. Some are under central and some under state government, including CSIR AMPRI and IISER.

== Sports ==
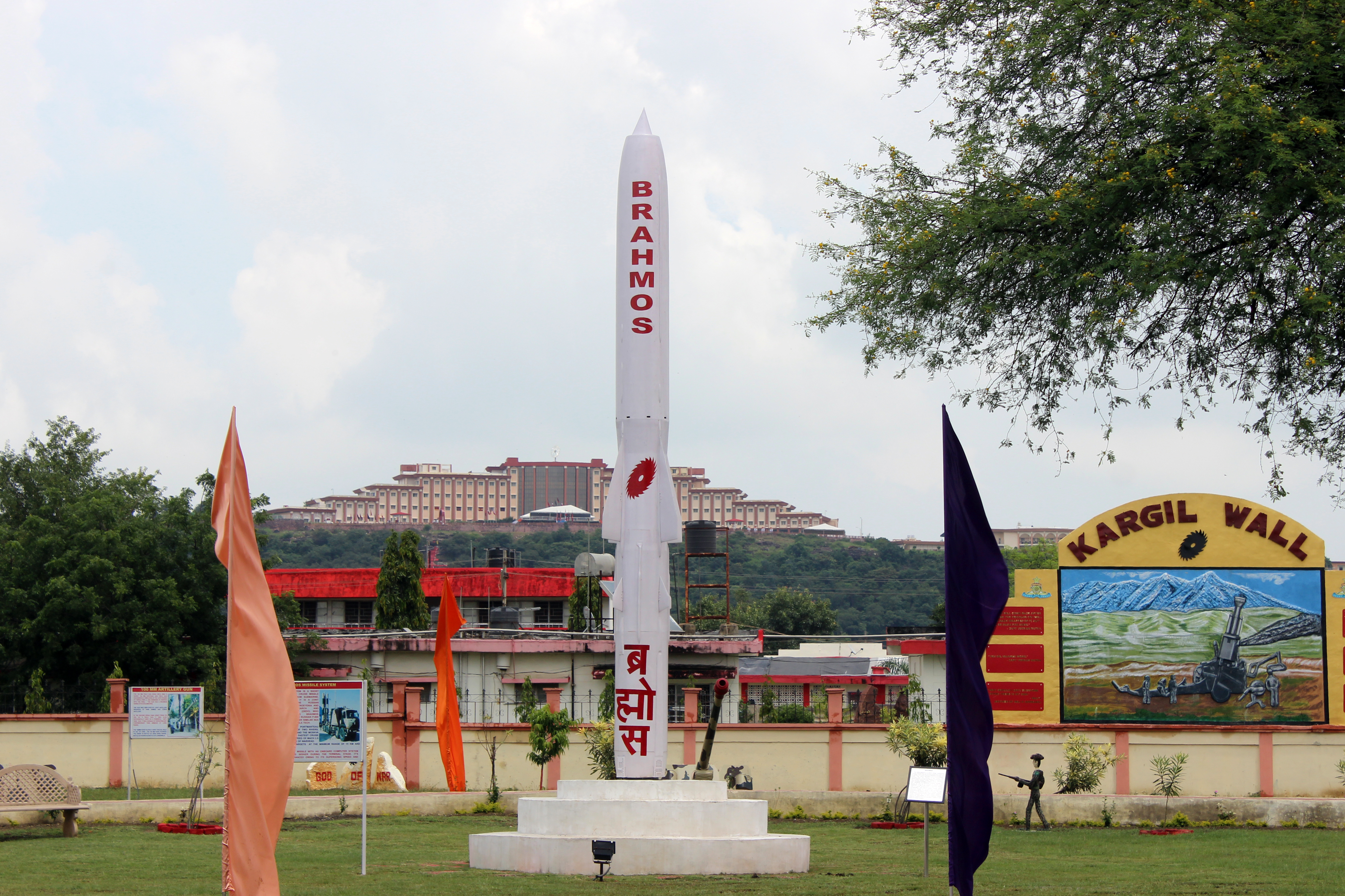
Yodhasthal

=== Teams ===
Bhopal Badshahs is a hockey team based in Bhopal that plays in World Series Hockey. The team is captained by Indian hockey player Sameer Dad and coached by Vasudevan Bhaskaran who was the captain of India's Olympic victory in 1980 Summer Olympics in Moscow. Badshahs defeated Chandigarh Comets in the inaugural match of 2012 World Series Hockey 4–3. Aishbagh Stadium in Bhopal is the home ground of Bhopal Badshahs.

=== Stadiums ===
- Aishbagh Stadium is a field hockey stadium in Bhopal.
- TT Nagar Stadium is a multi-purpose stadium is Bhopal.

== Places of interest ==
=== World Heritage Sites ===
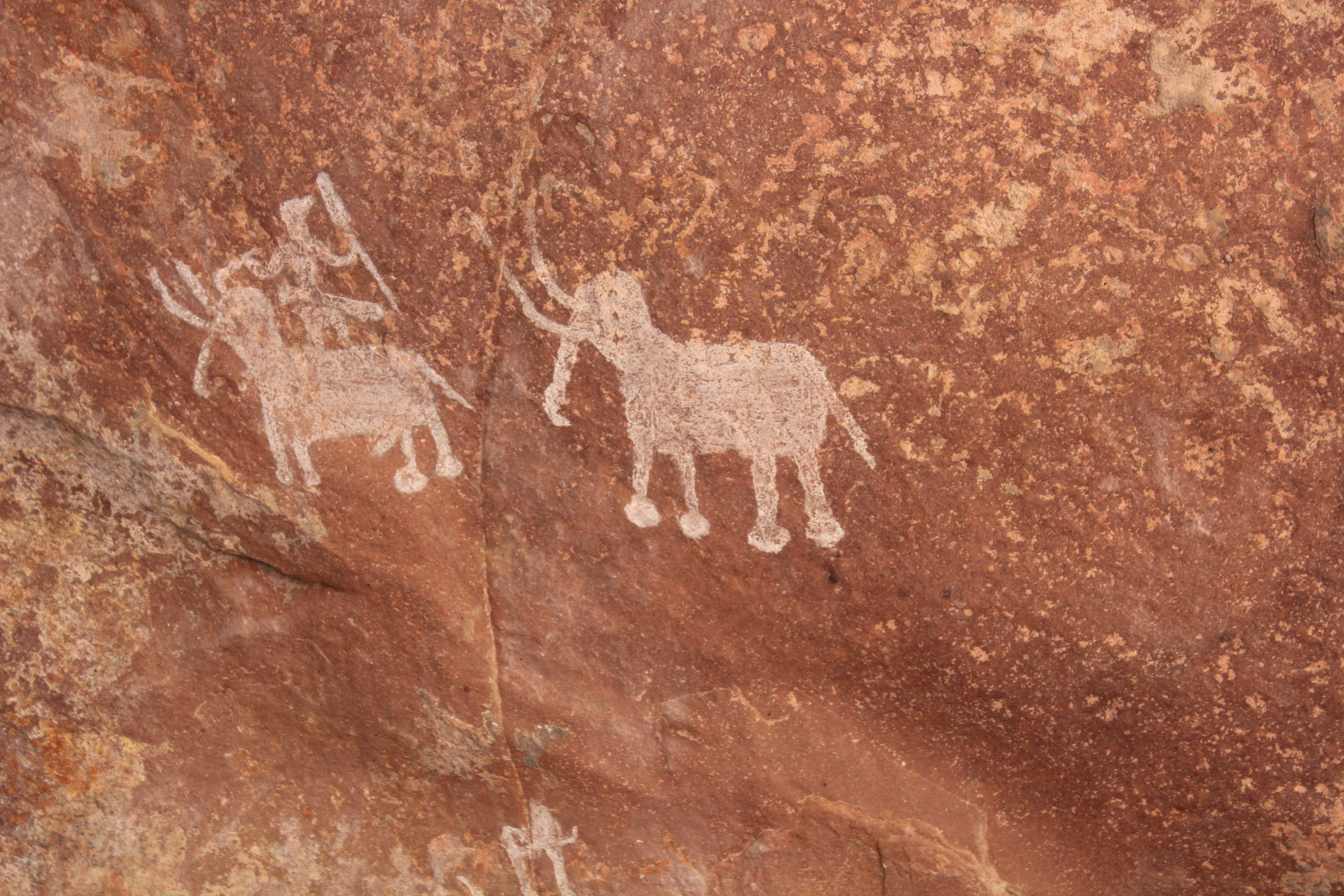
Bhimbetka pre-historic rock cave painting near Bhopal include 500 sandstone caves and shelters. These are dated to range from 12,000 years ago to Chalcolithic era of human history. They are a UNESCO World Heritage Site.

Bhimbetka Caves are about 35 kilometres from Bhopal city. They have evidence of dwellings of pre-historic man during the Paleolithic era. Rock paintings in the caves are specimens of pre-historic settlements in India. There are about 600 caves, but only 12 are open for visitors. The caves are located in the midst of sal and teak forests and includes a short trail around the caves. They were discovered by Wakankar in 1957. UNESCO declared Bhimbetka Caves as a World Heritage Site in 2003.

Sanchi Stupas are located about 47 kilometres from Bhopal city. The great stupa at Sanchi is probably the most iconic stupa ever built. It was initially built by the Mauryan emperor Ashoka the Great in the 3rd century BCE. Later additions were made during the Shunga Empire and Satavahana periods. There are two more stupas on the Sanchi hill along with the remains of Buddhist viharas, a Gupta period temple, etc. The site was into use till the 15th century CE.

=== Nature ===
Van Vihar National Park is a national park in central India. It is located in Bhopal, the capital city of Madhya Pradesh. Declared as a national park in 1979, it covers an area of about 4.45 sq. kms. Although it has the status of a national park, Van Vihar is developed and managed as a modern zoological park, following the guidelines of the Central Zoo Authority. The animals are kept in their near natural habitat. Most of the animals are either orphaned brought from various parts of the state or those, which are exchanged from other zoos. No animal is deliberately captured from the forest. Van Vihar is unique because it allows easy access to the visitors through a road passing through the park, security of animals assured from poachers by building trenches and walls, chain-link fence and by providing natural habitat to the animals.

Bhoj Wetland is a Ramsar site, declared in 2002. It is ideal for bird watching. Migratory birds from Central Asia winter here in huge numbers. Some threatened species like Sarus crane and woolly-neck inhabit here in good numbers. About 300 species of resident and migratory birds have been recorded in the area.

Ratapani Tiger Reserve is located near the southern end of the municipal limits of Bhopal. It is home to more than 50 tigers. About 15 tigers are reported to be present in the urban area of Bhopal. Some tigers migrate about 100 kilometres westward to Kheoni Wildlife Sanctuary. Bhopal is the only known example of wild tigers living within the city boundaries.

Halali Dam is located about 38 kilometres in the north of Bhopal. The huge backwater is home to many birds and attract many other migratory birds in winters. It is an Important Bird Area declared by Birdlife International.

Apart from lakes, Bhopal also has many water reservoirs in and around the city. These include Bhadbhada Dam, Kerwa Dam, Kaliyasot Dam and Kolar Dam. People of Bhopal mostly visit these places during weekends. The weather is pleasant during and post monsoon. These places are surrounded by greenery throughout the year.

=== Tourist attractions ===
Tourist attractions in Bhopal:

- Upper Lake (Bhopal)
- Lower Lake (Bhopal)
- Van Vihar National Park and Bhoj Wetland Ramsar Site
- Museum of Man (Manav Sangrahalaya)
- Tribal Museum and State Archaeological Museum
- Bharat Bhavan
- Taj-ul-Masjid
- Lakshmi Narayan Temple, Bhopal
- Taj Mahal Palace
- Kamlapati Palace and Kamla Park
- Regional Museum of Natural History and Shahpura Lake, Bhopal
- Shaurya Smarak

Tourist attractions near Bhopal:

- Sanchi – UNESCO World Heritage Site; located 47 kilometres north-east
- Bhojpur – 25 kilometres south-east
- Bhimbetka rock shelters – 40 kilometres south-east
- Raisen – 35 kilometres east
- Bijasan Mata Temple, Salkanpur - 70 km from Bhopal
- Jagdishpur - 15 km from the city of lakes

=== Activity centres ===
The Museum of Man in Bhopal exhibits tribal and folk houses from all corners of India.

=== Shopping ===
The New Market is a commercial area in Bhopal. It is characterised by offices, new businesses and trade establishments. Notable malls include DB City Mall in MP Nagar, and Aashima Anupama Mall. Apart from New Market, people can go for shopping at Chowk Bazar and Sarafa in Old City Area of Bhopal.

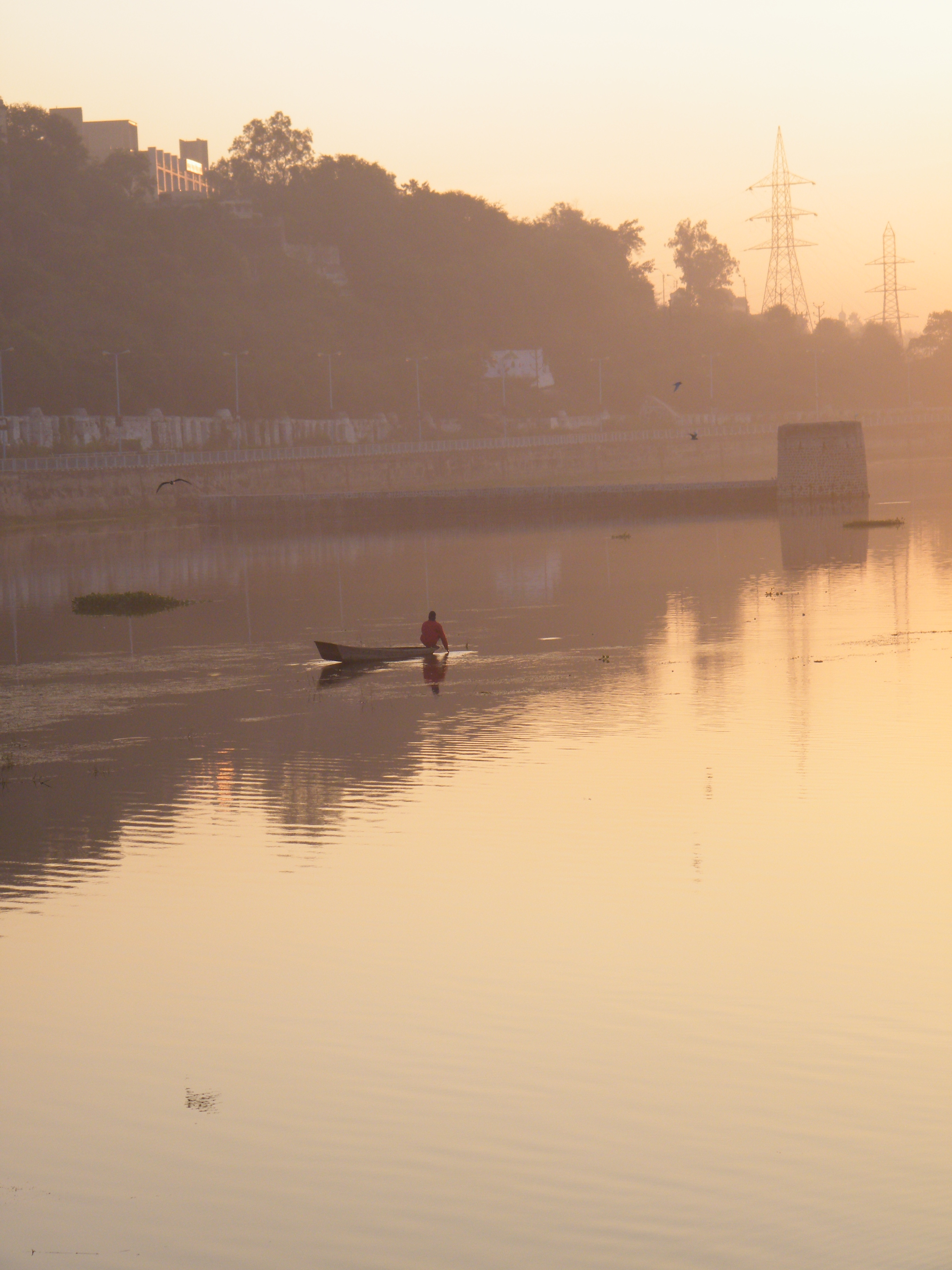
A view of the upper lake

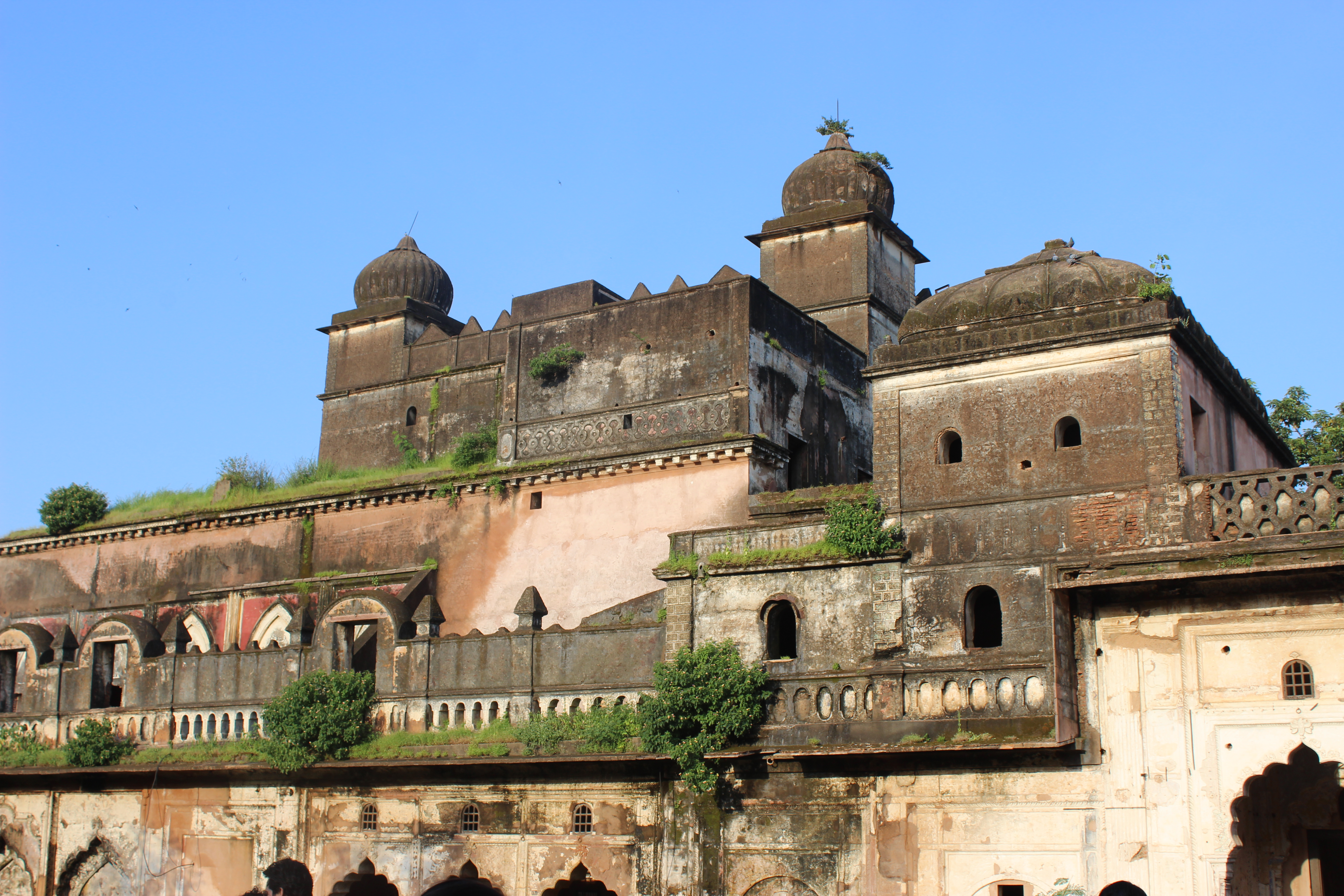
Taj Mahal main entrance back side

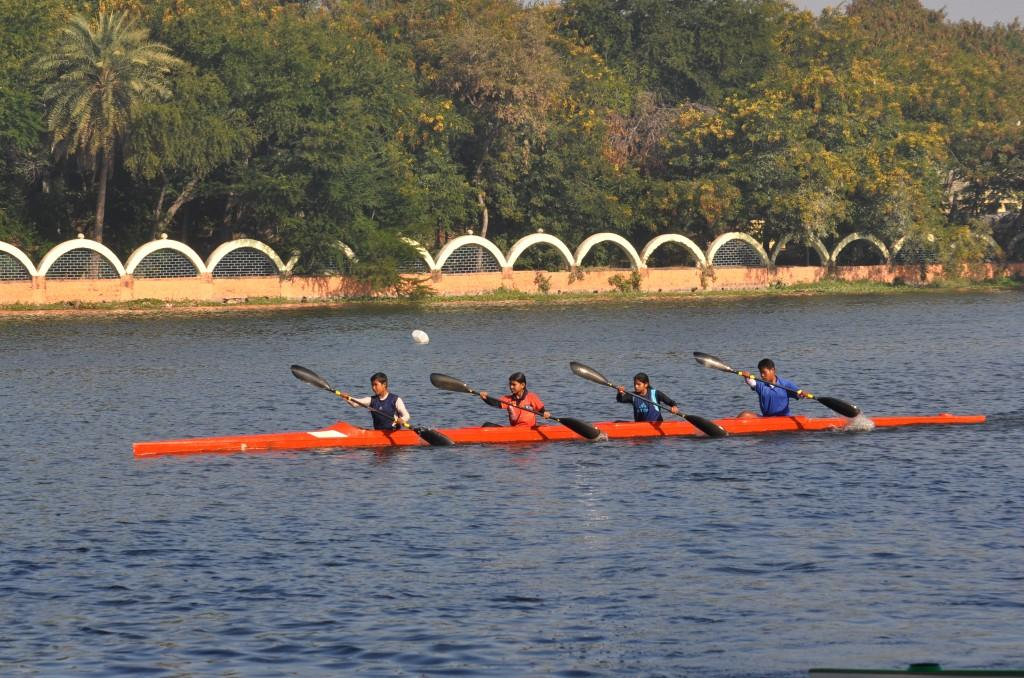
Lower Lake

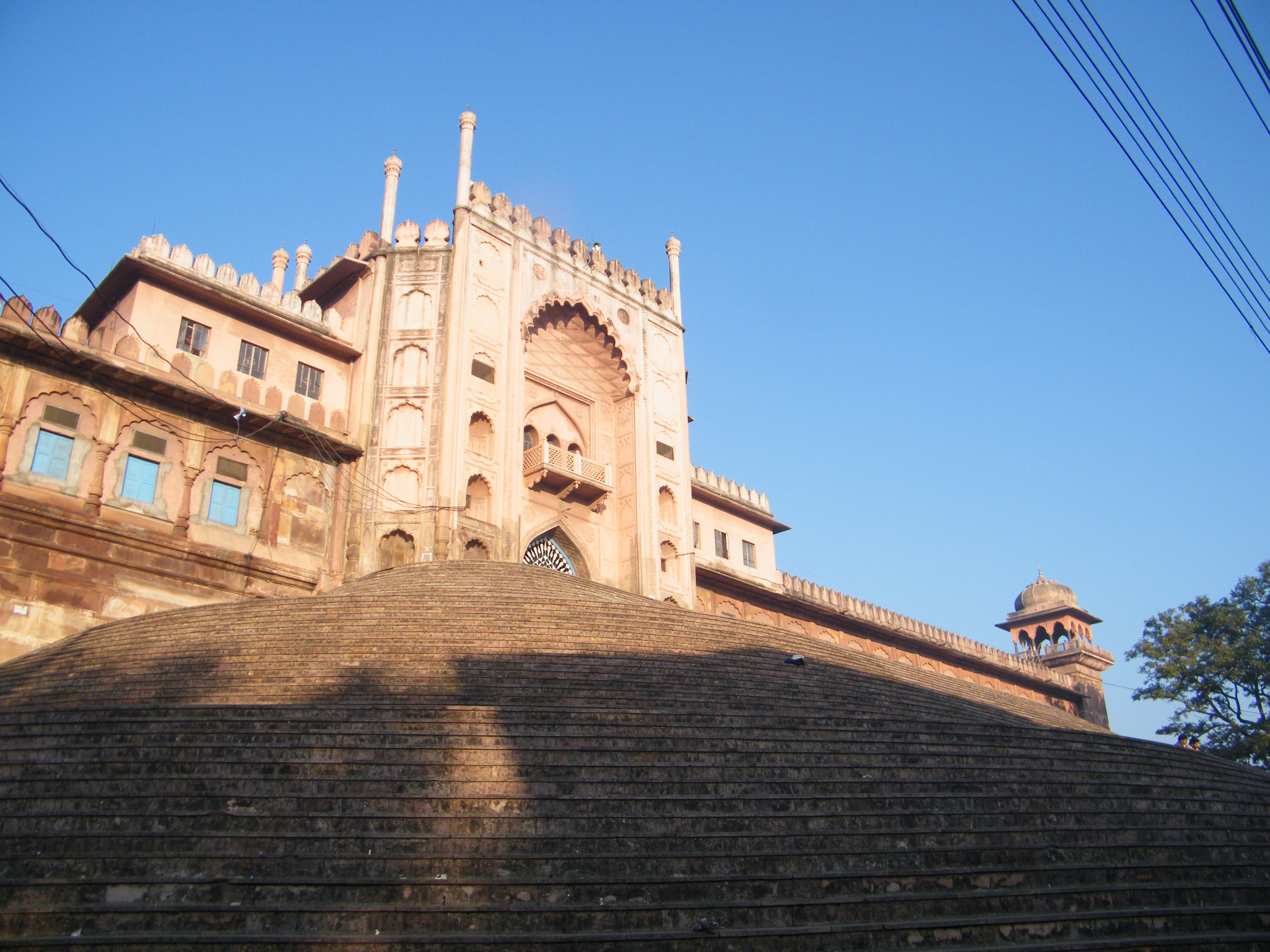
Taj-ul-Masajid gate

== Notable people ==
=== Politics, civil service, science ===
- Anees Ahmed – Lawyer in United Nations Peacekeeping Operations and United Nations International Criminal Tribunals
- Mohamed Barakatullah Bhopali – Prime Minister of the Provisional Government of India
- Balthazar Napoleon IV de Bourbon – Head of the House of Bourbon-Bhopal
- Tina Dabi, civil servant
- Najma Heptulla – Former Union Minister
- Kailash Chandra Joshi – Former Chief Minister of Madhya Pradesh
- Abdul Qadeer Khan – Pakistani nuclear physicist
- Raghuram Rajan – 23rd Governor of the Reserve Bank of India, 15th Chief Economic Adviser to the Government of India
- Shankar Dayal Sharma – Shankar Dayal Sharma was the ninth President of India, serving from the period of 1992 to 1997, he was elected to the Legislative Assembly of Bhopal from Berasia in the elections of 1952 and became Chief Minister of Bhopal State in 1952
- Paul Shrivastava – Professor of Management & Chief Sustainability Officer, The Pennsylvania State University
- Amit Sood – American physician, professor and author

=== Literature ===
- Muskan Ahirwar - librarian
- Manzoor Ahtesham – writer
- Javed Akhtar – poet, screenwriter and lyricist
- Bashir Badr – poet
- Asad Bhopali – poet and lyricist
- Kaif Bhopali – poet and lyricist
- Manzar Bhopali – poet
- Mohsin Bhopali – poet and travel writer
- Geet Chaturvedi – poet, novelist and lyricist
- Abdul Qavi Desnavi – writer

=== Sports ===
- Fatima Bano - female wrestling coach
- Sameer Dad – national hockey player
- Bhawna Dehariya – first female of Madhya Pradesh summit Mount Everest
- Aslam Sher Khan – national hockey player and Member of Parliament
- Shahryar Khan – chairman of Pakistan Cricket Board
- Mansoor Ali Khan Pataudi – former captain of the India national cricket team
- Jalaluddin Rizvi – national hockey player and Arjuna Award winner
- Jai Prakash Yadav - cricketer

=== Film, television and art ===
- Shawar Ali – Actor
- Jaya Bachchan – Actress
- Stebin Ben – Singer
- Shakeela Bano Bhopali – film actress and the first women Qawwal of India
- Shoaib Ibrahim – TV actor
- Annu Kapoor – Actor, TV presenter and National Film Award winner
- Arshi Khan – Actress, model
- Sara Khan – Actress
- Sunil Lahri – Actor
- Munnawar Masoom – Qawwali singer
- Vipul Roy – Actor
- Eisha Singh – Actress
- Saumya Tandon – Television actress
- Divyanka Tripathi – Actress
- Rajeev Verma – Actor
- Akanksha Puri – Actress

== Military presence ==
The Military Station Bhopal holds:

- The Garrison Headquarters of the XXI Corps.
- The 3rd Indian Army Corps of EME (3 EME)
- The Indian Air Force is also present in city but the units are unknown.

The city also holds the Units of NCC of all the 3 forces:

- The 12 MP Battalion (Army Wing)
- The 4 MP Battalion (Army Wing)
- The 2 MP Air Squadron (Air Wing)
- The 1 MP Naval Unit (Naval Wing)
