= Delhi Public School, Bhopal =

Location
- Near Neelbad Crossing, Bhadbhada Road; Bhopal - 462044; India

Information
- Other name: DPS Bhopal
- Type: Public School
- Motto: Service before Self
- Established: 2000
- Founder: Shri Gurudev Gupta
- Chairman: Mr. Hari Mohan Gupta
- Principal: Mrs. Vinita Malik (August 2017- Present); Mr. Ajay K Sharma (November 2005 - August 2017)
- Headmistress: Mrs. Mukta Sharma
- Headmaster: Dr. Yogesh Padegaonkar (vice principal)
- Faculty: 202, all Full time
- Enrollment: 7000+ currently enrolled
- Area: 23 acres (93,000 m^{2})
- Colors: Green and white
- Nickname: "The Dipsites"
- Affiliations: Central Board of Secondary Education, Indian Public Schools' Conference, CBSE Sahodaya School Complex
- Website: www.dpsbhopal.org

Delhi Public School (DPS), Neelbad, Bhopal, is a public secondary school run jointly by the Delhi Public School Society and the Jagran Social Welfare Society. Started in 2000 by Shri Gurudev Gupta, it is a co-educational day and boarding school with 7000+ students spread across its campus at Bhadbhada Road, Bhopal, India.

Delhi Public School (DPS), Neebad, Bhopal is affiliated to the Central Board of Secondary Education (CBSE) and the Indian Public Schools' Conference (IPSC).

== History ==
=== Suicide Incidents ===
There have been multiple suicides of students from DPS Bhopal.

A Class XI student named Adityaman Singh, a well-known singer, hanged himself in his home, convinced he won't be allowed into Class XII, allegedly due to a rule which enabled the school administration to discontinue the admission of a student who performs poorly in Class XI.

Parents say that they were called twice by then vice-principal, Vandana Dhupar, and had been warned that if their child doesn’t perform, he will be expelled as per the rules. Following the suicide, however, the school administration denied any existence of such a rule, and claimed that Adityaman had not failed.

Four Months after this incident, a Class VII student also hanged himself, leaving a note blaming poor marks for his decision.

== Co-scholastic activities ==
The school teams have won several trophies in sports, music and dance, and painting. The students have also won several debates, quizzes, computer related competitions and have also participated in various MUNs. The school also has a football and basketball team.
