= Kolar Dam (Bhopal) =

- Location within Madhya Pradesh
- Coordinates: 22.959520°N 77.346175°E
- Owners: Government of Madhya Pradesh, India

Dam and spillways
- Impounds: Kolar river
- Height: 45 m (148 ft)
- Length: 590 m (1,940 ft)

Kolar Dam is located on 35 km south-west of Bhopal city. It is built on Kolar river which is a tributary river of Narmada river. This dam is constructed near Lawakhweri village in Sehore district.

== Specifications ==
Water from the dam is a raw water source for the Kolar Water Treatment Plant which is managed by Public Health Engineering Department of Madhya Pradesh. This plant avails approx. 153 MLD treated water to Bhopal city which is 60% of total water supply to city. Its water treatment plant is largest and best among water treatment plants arranging water supply to Bhopal city.

== Purpose ==
- Irrigation and Water supply for Bhopal city

== See also ==
- List of reservoirs and dams in India
