= New Market, Bhopal =

New Market
- District of Bhopal
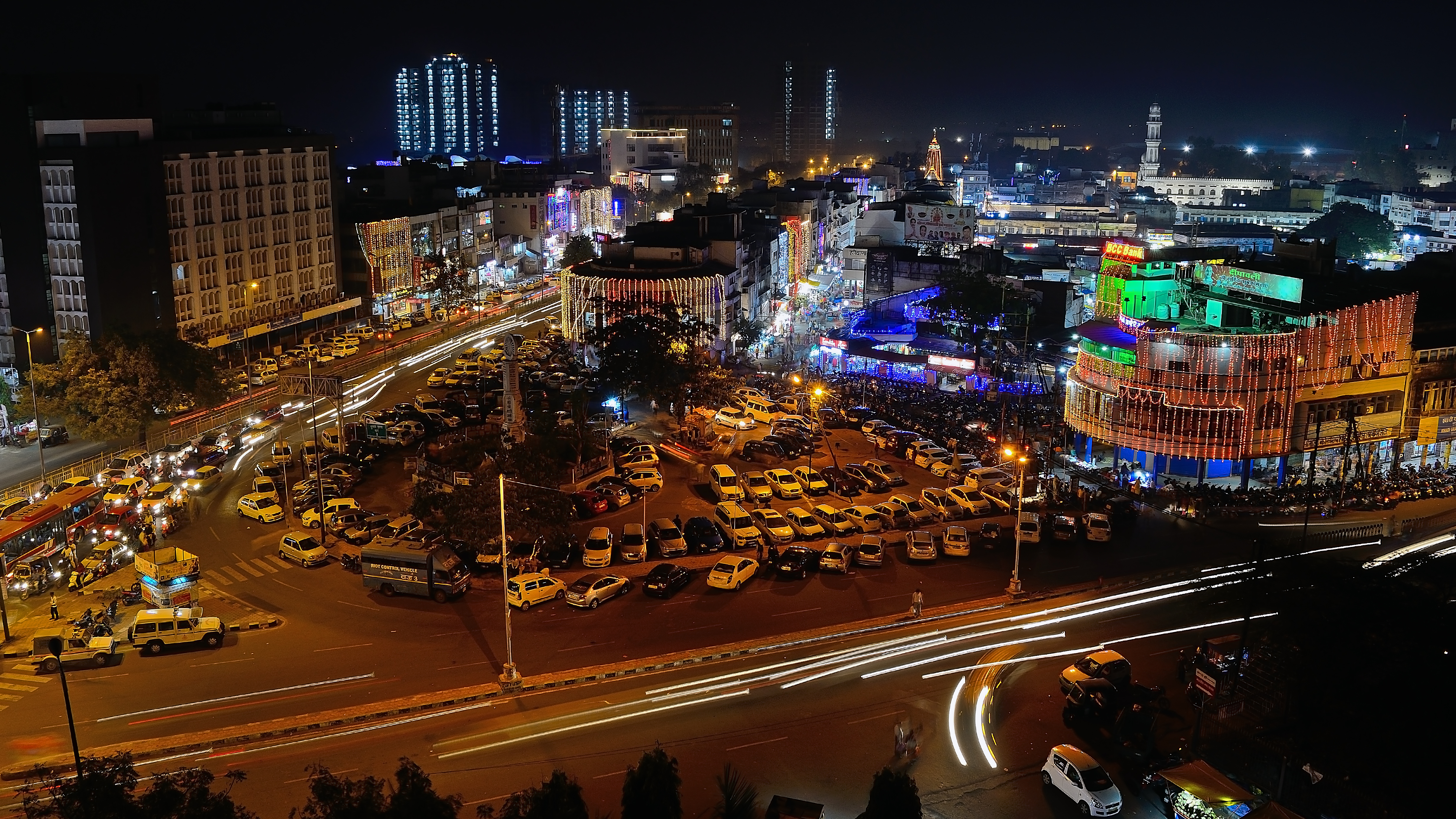
- Country: India
- State: Madhya Pradesh
- City: Bhopal
- Time zone: UTC+5:30 (IST)

New Market is an area and business district of Bhopal, Madhya Pradesh, India.

A commercial centre; the district is characterised by offices, new businesses and trade establishments.

== History ==
Between 1975-91 small industrial units were created in New Market.

Tatya Tope Nagar Sports Complex is located within the New Market area.
