= Advanced Materials and Processes Research Institute =

Research laboratory in Bhopal, Madhya Pradesh in India

Coordinates: 23.210803°N 77.446008°E

- Advanced Materials and Processes Research Institute
- Abbreviation: AMPRI
- Founder: Prof. P. K. Rohatgi, Dr. Navin Chand, Dr. KKS Gautam
- Founded at: New Delhi
- Type: Research Institution
- Region served: Madhya Pradesh
- Services: Lightweight Materials, Nano structured Materials, Smart and Functional materials, Waste to Wealth
- Official language: Hindi, English
- Director: Prof. (Dr.) Thallada Bhaskar
- Key people: Former Directors
- Parent organization: Council of Scientific and Industrial Research
- Website: www.ampri.res.in

The Advanced Materials and Processes Research Institute, Bhopal, formerly known as the Regional Research Laboratory, is a research laboratory in Bhopal, Madhya Pradesh in India. It was established in May 1981.

== History ==
AMPRI is a research institution of CSIR. It was earlier known as RRL Bhopal when the new name was adopted by Governing Body of CSIR. It was started in a building originally build for Cooperative Training College with 15 Scientist. The building for Cooperative training college was changed into what is called today Main Building, the boys hostel was modified to accommodate Administration building and the girls hostel is now known as MEMS Laboratory.

== Staff ==
CSIR AMPRI has around 100 permanent regular staff, 150 contract workers and 150 research scholars, project assistants, PhD and MTech students. The regular staff like other laboratories of CSIR is classified into four categories (i) Scientific (ii) Technical (iii) Auxiliary technical and (iv) Administrative. Director is the apex post in CSIR AMPRI.

== Courses ==
Under Academy of Scientific and Innovative Research AcSir various courses are offered by CSIR AMPRI, Bhopal. It includes admission to Ph.D. (Sciences), Ph.D. (Engineering) and IDDP(Integrated Dual Degree Program) in Engineering -M.Tech+Ph.D.

== Admission ==
Students are selected as per Admission Calendar by AcSir in August and January sessions. Reservations is available as per government of India rules.
