= Bhanpur =

- village
- Location within Madhya Pradesh Location within India
- Coordinates: 23.133983°N 77.350092°E
- Country: India
- State: Madhya Pradesh
- District: Bhopal
- Tehsil: Huzur

Population (2011)
  - Total: 2,120
- Time zone: UTC+5:30 (IST)
- ISO 3166 code: MP-IN
- Census code: 482523

Bhanpur is a village in the Bhopal district of Madhya Pradesh, India. It is located in the Huzur tehsil and the Phanda block.

== Demographics ==
According to the 2011 census of India, Bhanpur has 387 households. The effective literacy rate (i.e. the literacy rate of population excluding children aged 6 and below) is 32.66%.

Demographics (2011 Census)
	Total	Male	Female
Population	2120	1087	1033
Children aged below 6 years	485	256	229
Scheduled caste	167	97	70
Scheduled tribe	1196	595	601
Literates	534	346	188
Workers (all)	993	508	485
Main workers (total)	228	119	109
Main workers: Cultivators	124	62	62
Main workers: Agricultural labourers	62	30	32
Main workers: Household industry workers	13	8	5
Main workers: Other	29	19	10
Marginal workers (total)	765	389	376
Marginal workers: Cultivators	194	95	99
Marginal workers: Agricultural labourers	507	259	248
Marginal workers: Household industry workers	4	0	4
Marginal workers: Others	60	35	25
Non-workers	1127	579	548
