= List of institutions of higher education in Madhya Pradesh =

The Indian state of Madhya Pradesh has two central universities, sixteen state universities, (Note: Rajmata Vijayaraje Scindia Krishi Vishwa Vidyalaya is listed by ICAR but not by UGC.) three deemed universities, twenty private university three institutes of national importance, including an IIT. All India Institute of Medical Sciences and an NIT. The state also has an IIM and an IISER and Two NLUs.

The Department of Higher Education under Ministry of Human Resource Development lists 81 centrally funded institutes and 42 central universities. Two central universities, two regional centres of IGNOU (in Jabalpur and Bhopal), and eight centrally funded institutes are located in Madhya Pradesh.

== University ==
As of August 2011, UGC recognizes fifteen state universities in Madhya Pradesh, of which eleven universities receive financial assistance from central government and UGC in addition to Madhya Pradesh state government. Universities eligible for central assistance are marked with a ✩ in the table below.

University	Location	Established	Specialization	Type	Sources
People's University	Bhopal	2011	Medical	Private	Official website
Shri Vaishnav Vidyapeeth Vishwavidyalaya	Indore	1995	General	Private	
Techno Global University	Sironj	2013	General	Private	https://www.technoglobaluniversitymp.co.in/
Rabindranath Tagore University	Raisen	1985	General	Private	
Madhyanchal Professional University	Bhopal	2018	Engineering/ Pharmacy/ Nursing/ Paramedical/ Agriculture/ Education/ Management/ Arts & Humanities/Science & IT/Law/vocational Course	Private	Official website
Patel College of Science & Technology	Bhopal	2002	General	Private	
Aks University	Satna	2011	General	Private	[8]
AUMP	Gwalior	2010	General	Private(not-for-profit)	
Atal Bihari Vajpayee Hindi Vishwavidyalaya	Bhopal	2011	General	State	
Avantika University	Ujjain	2017	Design, Engineering	Private	
Awadhesh Pratap Singh University	Rewa	1968	General	State	Official website
Barkatullah University	Bhopal	1970	General	State	
Devi Ahilya University	Indore	1964	General	State	
Dr. Hari Singh Gour University	Sagar	1946	General	Central	(http://www.dhsgsu.edu.in/ Official website)
G.H. Raisoni University	Chhindwara	2016	General	Private	
Indira Gandhi National Tribal University	Amarkantak	2007	General	Central	
ITM University (Gwalior)	Gwalior	1997	General	Private	
Jabalpur Engineering College	Jabalpur	1947	Engineering	State	
Jagran Lakecity University	Bhopal	2013	General	Private	
Jawaharlal Nehru Agricultural University	Jabalpur	1964	Agriculture	State	
Jaypee University of Engineering and Technology	Guna	2003	General	Private	
Jiwaji University	Gwalior	1964	General	State	
Madhya Pradesh Bhoj Open University	Bhopal	1991	Distance education	State	
Madhya Pradesh Medical Science University	Jabalpur	2011	Medical	State	
Nanaji Deshmukh Veterinary Science University	Jabalpur	1948	Veterinary	State	
Maharaja Chhatrasal Bundelkhand University	Chhatarpur	2015	General	State	
Maharishi Mahesh Yogi Vedic Vishwavidyalaya	Katni	1995	General	State	
Maharishi Panini Sanskrit Evam Vedic Vishwavidyalaya	Ujjain	2008	Sanskrit	State	
Mahatma Gandhi Chitrakoot Gramoday University	Chitrakoot	1991	General	State	
Makhanlal Chaturvedi National University of Journalism and Communication	Bhopal	1991	Computer science, journalism and communication	State	
Mandsaur University	Mandsaur	2015	General	Private	
Mansarovar Global University	Bhopal	2018	General	Private	
Mahakaushal University Jabalpur	Jabalpur	2021	General	Private	
National Law Institute University^{✩}	Bhopal	1998	Law	Autonomous	
Oriental University	Indore	2011	General	Self-funded	
PK University	Shivpuri	2015	General	Private	
Raja Mansingh Tomar Music & Arts University	Gwalior	2008	music, dance, fine arts and drama & theater	State	
Rajiv Gandhi Technical University^{✩}	Bhopal	1998	Engineering	State	
Rajmata Vijayaraje Scindia Krishi Vishwavidyalaya^{‡}	Gwalior	2008	Agriculture	State	
Rani Durgavati University	Jabalpur	1956	General	State	
RKDF University	Bhopal	2012	General	Private	
Sardar Patel University Balaghat	Balaghat	2018	General	Private	
SAGE University	Indore	2017	General	Private	
Sarvepalli Radhakrishnan University	Bhopal		General	Private	
Sri Satya Sai University of Technology & Medical Sciences	Sehore	2014	General	Private	Official website
Swami Vivekanand University, Sagar	Sagar	2012	General	Private	
Vikram University	Ujjain	1957	General	State	
LNCT University	Bhopal	2015	General	Private	Official Web Site
SAM Global University	Bhopal	2019	General	Private	Official Web Site
SAGE University	Bhopal	2020	General	Private	
LNCT Vidhyapeeth University	Indore	2021	General	Private	Official Web Site
Rani Awantibai Lodhi University, Sagar	Sagar	2024	General	State	Official Web Site
Vikrant University	Gwalior	2022	General	Private	Official Web Site

^{†} granted university status

^{‡} Rajmata Vijayaraje Scindia Krishi Vishwa Vidyalaya (RVSKVV) was bifurcated from Jawaharlal Nehru Agricultural University by an act of the Madhya Pradesh government. While it is not listed by the UGC as a separate university, it is listed by the ICAR.

== Deemed ==
University	Location	Established	Specialization	Sources
Atal Bihari Vajpayee Indian Institute of Information Technology and Management	Gwalior	1997 (2001^{†})	Information technology	
Indian Institute of Information Technology, Design and Manufacturing, Jabalpur	Jabalpur	2005	Information technology and design	
Lakshmibai National University of Physical Education	Gwalior	1957 (1995^{†})	Physical education	
Sanchi University of Buddhist-Indic Studies	Sanchi	2013	General	Government

^{†} granted deemed university status

== Autonomous institutions ==
Institute	Location	Established	Specialization	Sources
Government Science College, Jabalpur	Jabalpur	1836	Sciences	
Government Thakur Ranmat Singh College, Rewa	Rewa	1869	Commerce, Arts, Science and Literature	
Holkar Science College, Indore	Indore	1891	Sciences	
Indian Institute of Forest Management	Bhopal	1982	Forest management	
Indian Institute of Tourism and Travel Management	Gwalior	1983	Tourism management	
Indian Institute of Management Indore	Indore	1998	Management	
Indian Institute of Science Education and Research, Bhopal	Bhopal	2008	Science	
Indian Institute of Technology Indore	Indore	2009	Technology	
Institute For Excellence In Higher Education, Bhopal	Bhopal	1995	Science, Art, Commerce And Literature	
Maulana Azad National Institute of Technology	Bhopal	1960	Technology	
National Institute of Fashion Technology	Bhopal		Design, Management and Technology	
National Institute of Technical Teacher's Training and Research	Bhopal		Technology training	
School of Planning and Architecture, Bhopal	Bhopal	2008	Architecture and planning	
Shri Govindram Seksaria Institute of Technology and Science	Indore	1952	Engineering, Science, Pharmacy, Management	
Xavier Institute of Development Action and Studies	Jabalpur	1995	Management	
St. Aloysius' College	Jabalpur	1951	Commerce, Management, Arts, Science & Computer Application	
