= List of engineering colleges in Madhya Pradesh =

This article is a partial list of the engineering colleges located in the state of Madhya Pradesh, India. The year that the college opened is shown in brackets.

== Central Government Institutions ==
1. Indian Institute of Technology, Indore
2. Maulana Azad National Institute of Technology, Bhopal (1960)
3. Indian Institute of Information Technology and Management, Gwalior
4. Indian Institute of Information Technology, Design and Manufacturing, Jabalpur
5. Indian Institute of Information Technology Bhopal

== State Government Autonomous/Aided Institutions ==
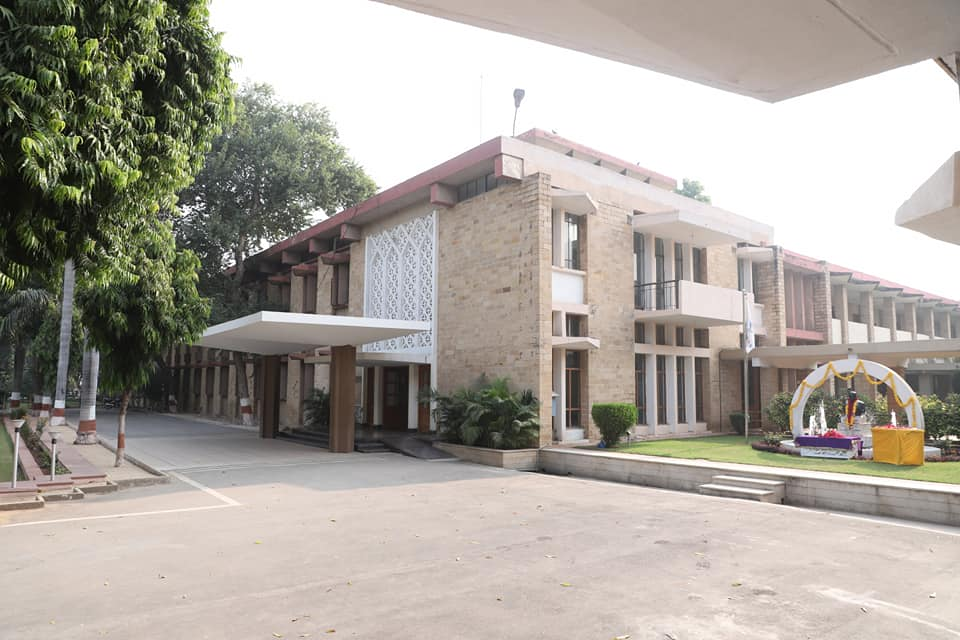
Front view of Madhav Institute of Technology & Science, Gwalior

1. Jabalpur Engineering College, Jabalpur (1947)
2. Shri Govindram Seksaria Institute of Technology and Science, Indore (1952)
3. Madhav Institute of Technology and Science, Gwalior (1957)
4. Samrat Ashok Technological Institute, Vidisha (1960)
5. Rewa Engineering College, Rewa (1964)
6. Ujjain Engineering College, Ujjain (1966)
7. Indira Gandhi Engineering College Sagar (1981)
8. Engineering College, Nowgong (2013)
9. Mahatma Gandhi Chitrakoot Gramodaya Vishwavidyalaya, Satna (1991)

== Self-financing ==
1. Barkatullah University Institute of Technology, Bhopal (1997)
2. Institute of Engineering and Technology, DAVV, Indore
3. Rustamji Institute of Technology, Tekanpur, Gwalior (1999)
4. University Institute of Technology, RGPV, Bhopal (1986)
5. School of Engineering and Technology, Vikram University, Ujjain (2011)
6. University Institute of Technology, RGPV, Shahdol (2015)

== Private Engineering Colleges ==
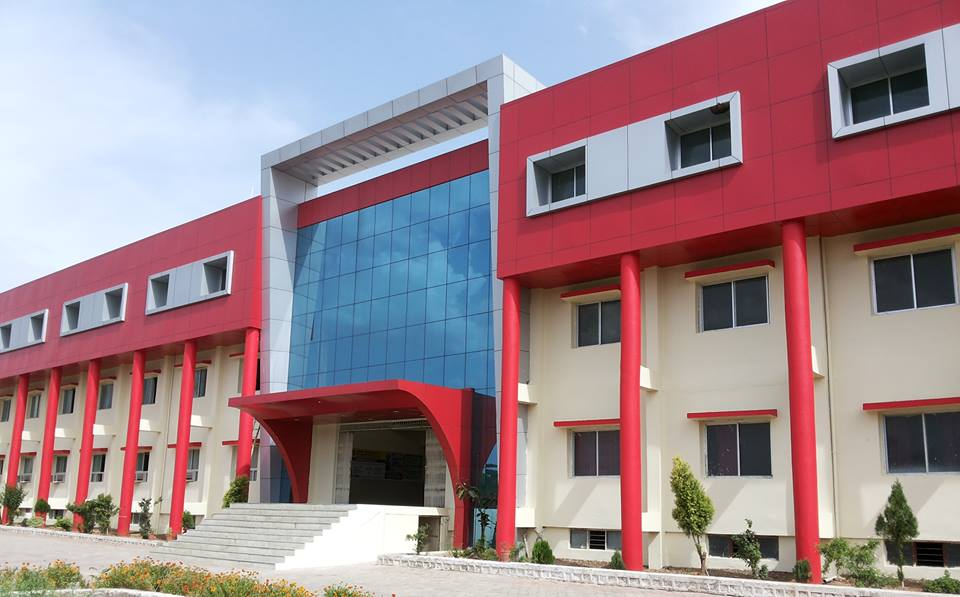
LNCT Jabalpur

1. MIT Group of Institutes, Ujjain
2. Indore Institute of Science and Technology
3. Sagar Institute of Science and Technology (SISTec), Bhopal
4. Patel Group of Institutions, Bhopal
5. Bansal Institute of Science & Technology
6. Bhopal Institute of Technology and Science, Bhopal
7. Gyansagar College Of Engineering, Sagar
8. Technocrats Institute of Technology, Bhopal
9. Corporate Group of Institutions, Bhopal
10. Gyan Ganga College of Technology, Jabalpur
11. Gyan Ganga Institute of Technology and Sciences, Jabalpur
12. Lakshmi Narain College of Technology, Jabalpur
13. Lakshmi Narain College of Technology, Bhopal
14. Oriental Institute of Science and Technology, Bhopal
15. Sagar Institute of Research & Technology, Bhopal
16. SAGE School of Engineering and Technology SAGE University Bhopal
17. Hitkarini College of Engineering & Technology, Jabalpur
18. Medi-Caps Institute of Technology & Management, Indore
19. Shri Vaishnav Institute of Technology and Science, Indore
20. AKS University, Satna
21. Bhabha Engineering Research Institute, Bhopal
22. Institute Of Engineering & Science IPS Academy, Indore
23. Truba Group of Institutes, Bhopal
24. NRI Group of Institutions, Bhopal
25. Lakshmi Narain College of Technology and Science
26. Institute of Technology & Management, Gwalior
27. Amity University, Gwalior
28. Jaypee University of engineering and technology, Guna
29. Millennium Group of Institutions, Bhopal
30. SKITM Shivaji Rao kadam Institute of Technology, Indore
31. Sushila Devi Bansal College of Technology, Indore
32. Symbiosis University of Applied Sciences, Indore
33. Lord Krishna College of Engineering, Indore
34. Maharana Pratap College of Technology, Gwalior
35. Vindhya Institute of Technology and Science(VITS), Satna
36. Madhyanchal Professional University
