= List of educational institutions in Indore =

Indore is home to educational institutions ranging from pre-primary through to post-graduate studies. In 2009 Indore became the first city in India to house both an Indian Institute of Management and an Indian Institute of Technology.

== Schools ==
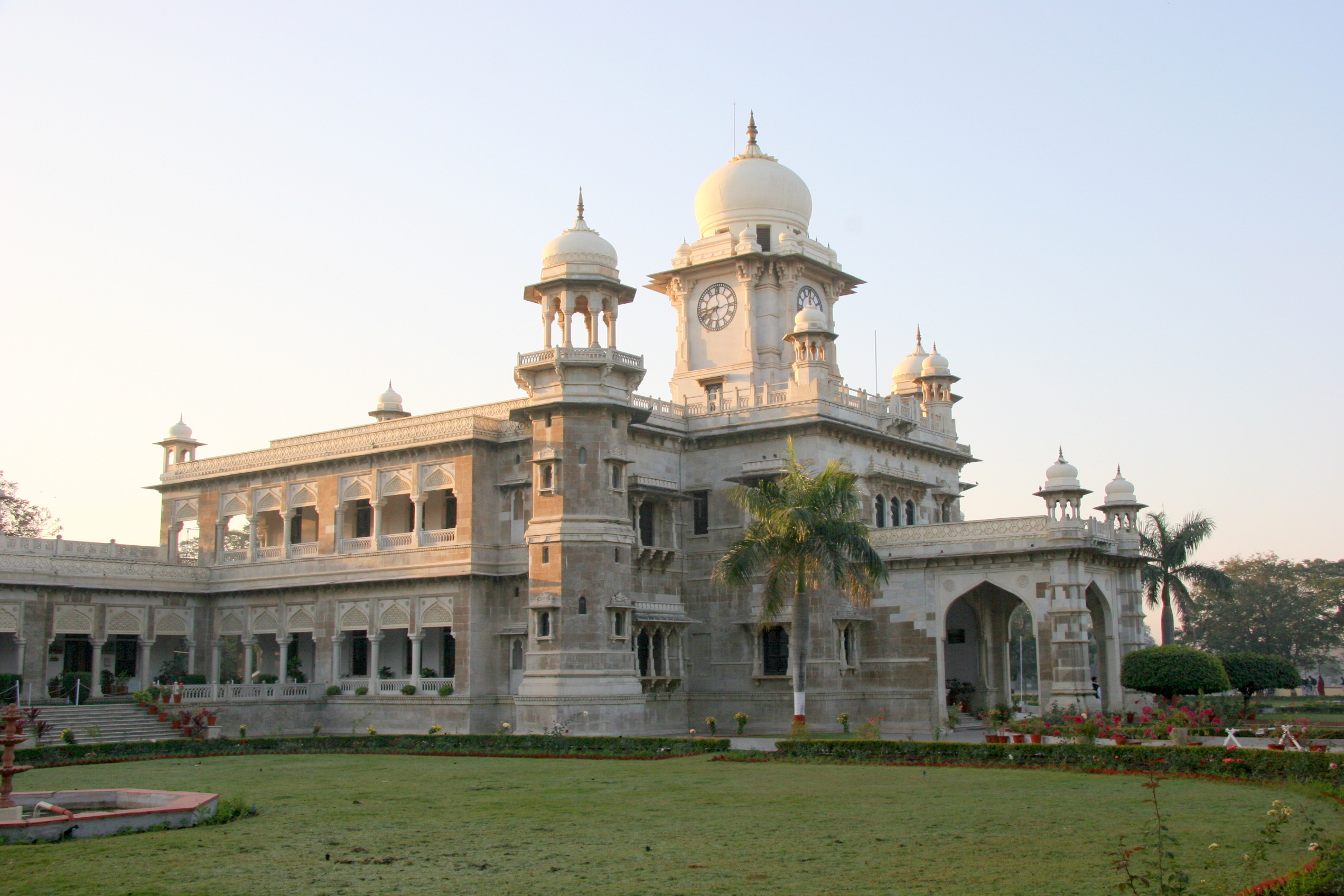
Daly College, Indore

St.Paul H.S. School Indore

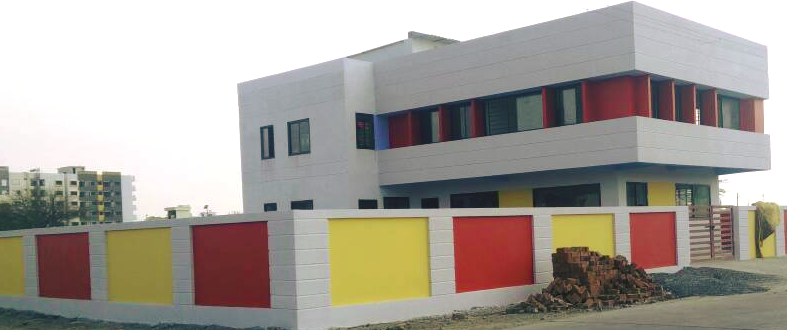
Gyankriti Nipania Campus

Schools for primary and higher secondary education in Indore include those listed below:

- Little Master International School, Indore
- Pakiza Play School, Indore, Primary CBSE School in Indore
- SDPS International School
- Advanced Academy, Indore
- Daly College
- Guru Harkrishan Public School, Indore
- Gyankriti Schools, An IIT alumni venture
- Government Multi Malhar Ashram Higher Secondary School, Indore
- Mount Litera Zee School, Indore
- Choithram School
- Navodaya Vidyalaya Indore
- Prestige Public School
- Saraswati Gyan Mandir School
- S.I.C.A Senior Secondary School, Indore
- Shri Ram Centennial School
- Sri Sathya Sai Vidya Vihar, Indore
- St. Paul Higher Secondary School, Indore
- St. Raphael's Girls' Higher Secondary School
- St. Vincent Palloti H.S. School
- New Era Public Academy, Indore
- The Emerald Heights International School
- The Shishukunj International School
- Shloka-A Birla School
- Queens' College, Indore
- Taiba College, Indore
- The Vidhyanjali International School
- Mar Thoma Hr. Sec School School
- Sharda Ramkrishna Vidhya Mandir
- Shree Vaishnav Academy
- Pakiza Public School, Indore, For Secondary & Higher Secondary Education
- New Digamber Public School
- Pioneer Convent School
- Pioneer Public School
- Tulip Kids International School
- VIBGYOR Roots and Rise, Indore, Vijay Nagar
- VIBGYOR Kids, Indore, Vijay Nagar

== Universities ==
- DAVV is the state university of Indore
- Symbiosis University of Applied Sciences is the Countries First Skill Development University by Symbiosis Foundation, Pune.
- SVVV, Indore
- SAGE University, Indore
- SVKM's NMIMS (Narsee Monjee Institute of Management Studies), Indore campus
- Dr. A.P.J. Abdul Kalam University
- Oriental University is Indore's first self-funded private university
- Medi-Caps University is a private university 10 km away from Indore city in Pigdamber, Rau
- Prestige University
- Renaissance College of Commerce and Management
- Prestige Institute of Management and Research (PIMR)
- Symbiosis University of Applied Sciences

== Colleges ==
=== Engineering & Technology ===
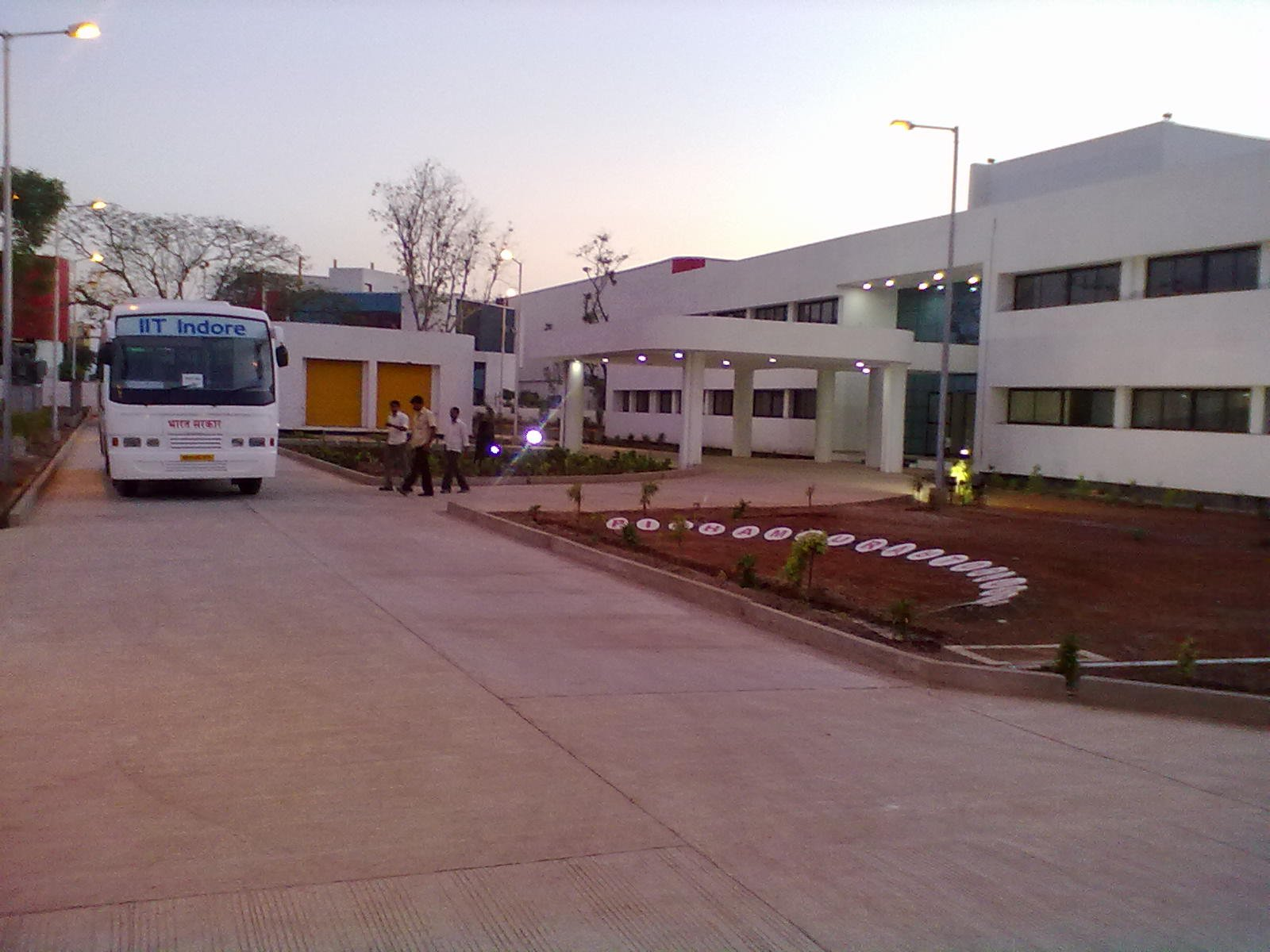
PACL Campus, Indian Institute of Technology, Indore

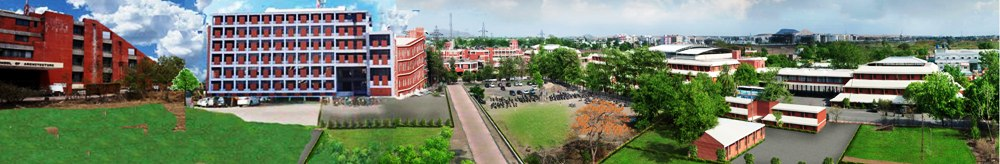
IPS Academy Institute of Engineering and Science

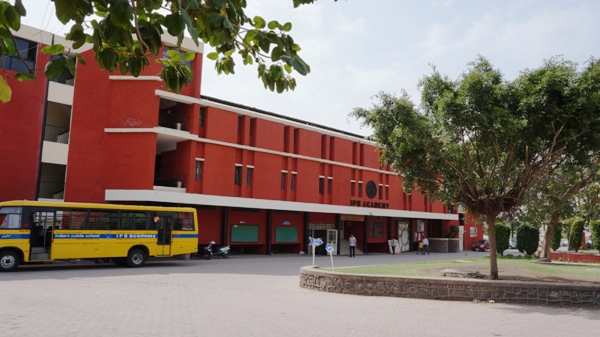
Administrative Block IPSA Indore

Following is a list of institutions offering graduate and post-graduate courses in engineering and technology :

- Acropolis Institute of Technology & Research, Indore
- SVKM's NMIMS, School of Technology, Management and Engineering, Indore, Top Engineering college of Madhya Pradesh
- BM College of Technology, Indore
- Chameli Devi Group of Institutions, Indore
- Indian Institute of Technology Indore
- Indore Institute of Science & Technology, Indore
- Institute of Engineering and Technology, DAVV, Indore
- IPS Academy, Institute of Engineering and Science, Indore
- Lakshmi Narain College of Technology & Science (RIT), Indore
- LNCT (BHOPAL) INDORE CAMPUS
- Malwa Institute of Science & Technology, Indore
- Mathura Devi Institute of Technology & Management, Indore
- Medi-Caps
- Patel College of Science and Technology, Indore
- Prestige Institute of Engineering Management and Research, Indore
- Shri R.G.P. Gujarati Professional Institute
- Sanghvi Institute of management & Science, Indore
- Shiv Kumar Singh Institute of Technology & Science, Indore
- Shivajirao Kadam Institute of Technology and Management-Technical Campus, Indore
- Shri G.S. Institute of Technology & Science, Indore
- Shri Vaishnav Institute of Technology and Science
- Sri Aurobindo Institute of Technology, Indore
- Sushila Devi Bansal College of Engineering, Indore
- Swami Vivekanand College of Engineering, Indore
- Vikrant Institute of Technology & Management Indore
- Vindhya Institute of Technology & Science, Indore
- Shri Vaishnav Polytechnic College, Indore

=== Management ===
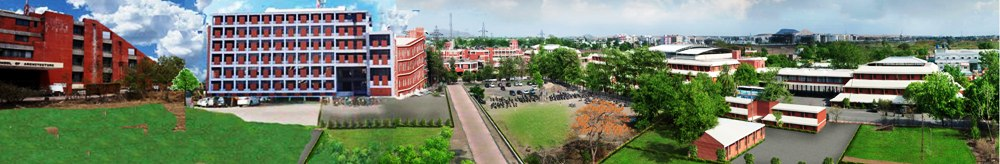
IPS Academy Institute of Business Management and Research

The following colleges offer courses in Management :-

- Acropolis Institute of Management Studies & Research, Indore
- Indian Institute of Management Indore
- Indore Management Institute, Indore
- Indore Indira Business School
- Institute of Management Studies, DAVV
- IPS Academy Institute of Business Management and Research
- Jaipuria Institute of Management, Indore
- Shri R.G.P. Gujarati Professional Institute
- Pioneer Institute of Professional Studies
- Prestige
- SVKM's Narsee Monjee Institute of Management Studies
- Sri Aurobindo Institute of Management & Science
- Symbiosis University of Applied Sciences, Indore

==== Law Colleges ====
- SVKM's NMIMS, School of Law, Top Law college in Indore
- Liberal College Indore RAU MP* Collegedunia.com

=== Medicine ===
The following colleges offer courses in Medicine.

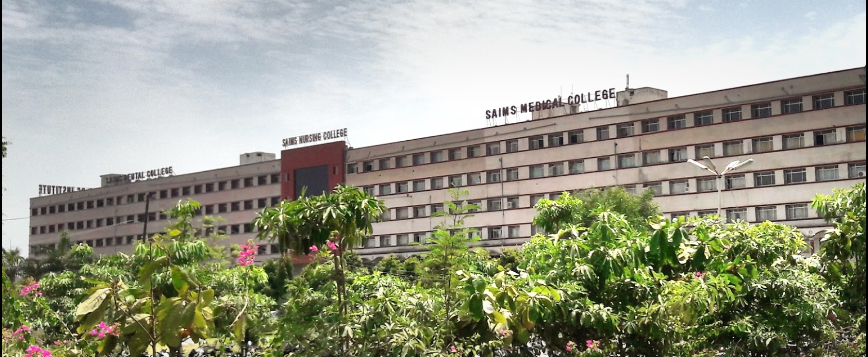
Photograph of SAIMS main building

- Index Medical College Hospital & Research Institute
- MGM Medical College
- Shubhdeep Ayurved Medical College & Hospital (PG Institute), Indore (MP)
- Shubhdeep College of Nursing, Indore (MP)
- Sri Aurobindo Institute of Medical Sciences

=== Professional colleges ===
Shri Jain Swetamber Professional Academy

- Holkar Science College
- M.B. Khalsa College
- Cindrebay school of Design

=== Digital marketing institutes ===
- Symbiosis University of Applied Sciences
- Digital Gurukul
- Digital Marketing Course in Indore
- Techstack
- Madrid Software

=== Music ===
- Govt. Music College
- Vasant Sangeet Mahavidyalaya
- Sangeet Gurukul Academy
- JR School Of Music
- Saregama College of Arts
- The Drumming Institute
- Pancham Nishad
- Mech Music Academy
- Naad Gunjan Music Academy

=== Interior Design institutes ===
- Cindrebay school of design
- SNDP college
- IPS college
- INIFD

=== Software training institutes ===
- IT Training Indore
