= List of educational institutions in Bhopal =

List of educational institutions in Madhya Pradesh

This list covers various types of educational institutions in the city of Bhopal, Madhya Pradesh.

== Universities ==
- Atal Bihari Vajpayee Hindi Vishwavidyalaya
- Azim Premji University
- Barkatullah University
- Jagran Lakecity University
- Madhya Pradesh Bhoj Open University
- Makhanlal Chaturvedi National University of Journalism and Communication
- Rabindranath Tagore University, Bhopal
- Rajiv Gandhi Proudyogiki Vishwavidyalaya
- Sarvepalli Radhakrishnan University
- VIT Bhopal University

== Institutions of National Importance (INI) ==
- Indian Institutes of Information Technology (IIIT Bhopal)
- Indian Institute of Science Education and Research (IISER Bhopal)
- Maulana Azad National Institute of Technology (MANIT Bhopal)
- National Institute of Design (NID Bhopal)
- School of Planning and Architecture, Bhopal (SPA Bhopal)

== Medical colleges ==
- AIIMS, Bhopal
- Gandhi Medical College, Bhopal
- People's College of Medical Sciences and Research

== Private engineering colleges ==
- Oriental Institute of Science and Technology, Bhopal (1995)
- Patel College of Science & Technology Bhopal (2008)
- Radharaman Institute of Technology & Science, Bhopal (2003)
- Sagar Institute of Science and Technology

== Notable schools ==
- Army Public School, Bhopal, 1978 secondary school
- Campion School (boys-only) (CBSE)
- Carmel Convent School (girls-only) (CBSE)
- Delhi Public School, Bhopal (CBSE)
- St Joseph's Co-Ed School, Bhopal (CBSE)
- St Joseph's Convent School, Bhopal (girls-only) (CBSE)
- St. Xavier's School, Bhopal (CBSE)
