= Ratibad =

Ratibad may refer to:

- Ratibad (census code 482350), a village in Huzur tehsil of Bhopal district, Madhya Pradesh, India; located near NH-12
- Ratibad (census code 482517), a village in Huzur tehsil of Bhopal district, Madhya Pradesh, India; located near Bhopal-Sehore road
