= VIBGYOR =

VIBGYOR (Violet–Indigo–Blue–Green–Yellow–Orange–Red) is a popular mnemonic device used for memorizing the traditional optical spectrum.

VIBGYOR may refer to:

- ROYGBIV, the exact reverse of VIBGYOR; the sequence of hues commonly ascribed to the rainbow colors
- ViBGYOR Film Festival
- VIBGYOR Group of Schools, is a chain of private schools in India that offers CBSE, CISCE, and Cambridge curricula.Official Website
