= OIST =

OIST may refer to

- Okinawa Institute of Science and Technology, in Japan
- Oriental Institute of Science and Technology, in India
