= Anubhav Dubey =

Indian entrepreneur

- Born: 1996 (age 29–30); Rewa, Madhya Pradesh
- Education: Renaissance College of Commerce and Management
- Occupation: Entrepreneur
- Known for: Founder and CEO of Chai Sutta Bar

Anubhav Dubey (born 1996) is an Indian entrepreneur and the co-founder and chief executive officer of Chai Sutta Bar, an Indian tea cafe chain.

== Early life and education ==
Dubey was born in 1996 in Rewa, Madhya Pradesh. He completed his schooling from Maharishi Vidya Mandir in Rewa and completed a Bachelor of Commerce degree from Renaissance College of Commerce and Management. After completing his college education, Dubey moved to Delhi to prepare for the Union Public Service Commission civil services examination, later he left his civil-service preparation and returned to Indore to start his own business.

== Career ==
In 2016, Dubey and Anand Nayak started a tea business in Indore under the name Chai Sutta Bar. According to Scroll, they started the business with an investment of about ₹3 lakh and opened their first outlet near a girls' hostel, and focused on serving tea in traditional kulhad cups, a concept that later became central to the brand’s identity.

The Economic Times reported that Chai Sutta Bar had about 700 outlets, including locations in Dubai, Abu Dhabi, CANADA & Nepal.
