= Fatehpur Dobra =

- village
- Location within Madhya Pradesh Location within India
- Coordinates: 23.156512°N 77.336247°E
- Country: India
- State: Madhya Pradesh
- District: Bhopal
- Tehsil: Huzur

Population (2011)
  - Total: 743
- Time zone: UTC+5:30 (IST)
- ISO 3166 code: IN-MP
- Census code: 482521

Fatehpur Dobra is a village in the Bhopal district of Madhya Pradesh, India. It is located in the Huzur tehsil and the Phanda block. The Radharaman Institute of Technology & Science is located nearby.

In 2012, the Government of Madhya Pradesh allotted a land in this village for the sector headquarters of the Border Security Force.

== Demographics ==
According to the 2011 census of India, Fatehpur Dobra has 150 households. The effective literacy rate (i.e. the literacy rate of population excluding children aged 6 and below) is 58.41%.

Demographics (2011 Census)
	Total	Male	Female
Population	743	352	391
Children aged below 6 years	125	47	78
Scheduled caste	7	2	5
Scheduled tribe	0	0	0
Literates	361	210	151
Workers (all)	224	197	27
Main workers (total)	145	133	12
Main workers: Cultivators	109	101	8
Main workers: Agricultural labourers	4	3	1
Main workers: Household industry workers	4	4	0
Main workers: Other	28	25	3
Marginal workers (total)	79	64	15
Marginal workers: Cultivators	11	7	4
Marginal workers: Agricultural labourers	53	43	10
Marginal workers: Household industry workers	3	3	0
Marginal workers: Others	12	11	1
Non-workers	519	155	364
