= Saket (disambiguation) =

Saket may refer to:

== Places ==
- Sāketa, sometimes called Saket, is the Sanskrit word for the Indian city Ayodhya
  - Saket Express, train between Ayodhya and Mumbai
- Saket (Delhi), a district in Delhi, India
  - Saket District Centre, commercial centre in New Delhi
  - Saket metro station, Metro station in Delhi, India
- Saket Nagar, a suburb of Bhopal, Madhya Pradesh, India

== Individuals ==
- Saket Chaudhary, Indian screenwriter
- Saket Kushwaha, Indian educationist and agricultural economist
- Saket Misra, Indian politician
- Saket Saurabh, Indian computer scientist
