= Shri Vaishnav Polytechnic College, Indore =

Public polytechnic college in Indore, Madhya Pradesh, India

- Shri Vaishnav Polytechnic College
- Type: Government aided Technical Institution
- Established: 1962; 64 years ago
- Accreditation: AICTE, New Delhi
- Academic affiliations: Department of Technical Education, Madhya Pradesh; Rajiv Gandhi Proudyogiki Vishwavidyalaya
- Location: Indore, Madhya Pradesh, India; 22.7067°N 75.8396°E
- Campus: urban 17 acres
- Website: svpindore.org

Shri Vaishnav Polytechnic College, Indore is a public polytechnic college in Indore, Madhya Pradesh, India. It is a Government aided institution established in 1962 by the Shri Vaishnav Sahayak Kapda Market Technical Education (SVSKMTE) Society Indore. It offers diploma, post diploma and certificate programs in engineering & technology. The college is accredited by the All India Council for Technical Education (AICTE) and affiliated with the Department of Technical Education, Madhya Pradesh and Rajiv Gandhi Proudyogiki Vishwavidyalaya.
