= Rewa Engineering College =

Engineering college in Madhya Pradesh

- रीवा अभियांत्रिकी महाविद्यालय
- Former name: Government Engineering College-Rewa
- Motto: तेजस्वि नावधीतमस्तु (tejasvi naavadhiitamastu) (Sanskrit)
- Motto in English: May our knowledge become brilliant
- Type: Public Institution
- Established: 1964
- Affiliations: Rajiv Gandhi Proudyogiki Vishwavidyalaya
- Chairman: Shri Umashankar Gupta
- Principal: Dr. B.K. Agrawal
- Undergraduates: 340
- Postgraduates: 60
- Location: Rewa, Madhya Pradesh, India; 24°32′0″N 81°18′0″E
- Campus: 250 acre
- Website: www.recrewa.ac.in

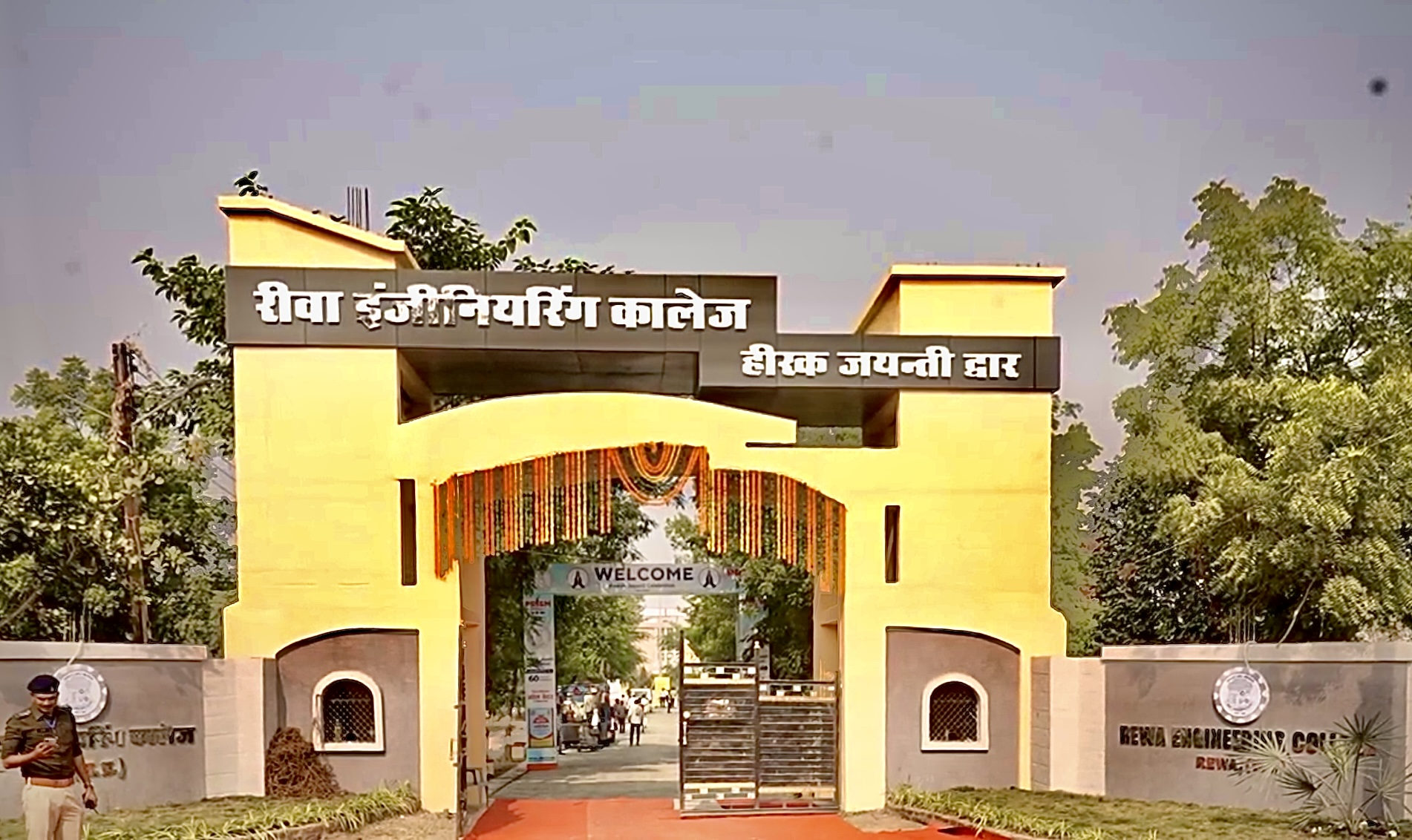
Entrance of REC Rewa

Rewa Engineering College (REC), formerly known as Government Engineering College (GEC), is an institute of technology located in Rewa, Madhya Pradesh, India. It is an autonomous institution funded by the Government of Madhya Pradesh, India.

REC is an autonomous institute. However it depends on Rajiv Gandhi Proudyogiki Vishwavidyalaya for academics and administrative purposes.

== History ==
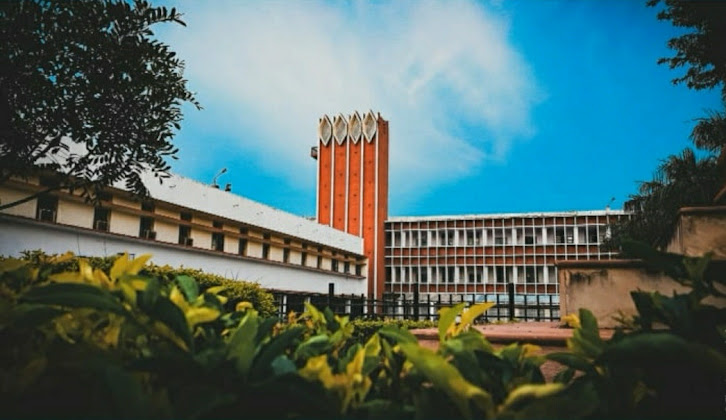
Main building of REC Rewa

Formerly known as Government Engineering College (GEC Rewa), was established by the Govt. of M.P. in 1964.It was initially set up at the present Model Science college building with Prof. S.R. Beedkar as founder Principal, later it was shifted to Government B.Ed College building. In 1972, it was shifted to its present location, spreading across 250 acres (1.0 km^{2}).

The institute was affiliated with Awadhesh Pratap Singh University, Rewa, until 2000. Afterwards it was affiliated to Rajiv Gandhi Proudyogiki Vishwavidyalaya, Bhopal, Madhya Pradesh. The first batch was started with 120 students for the courses of Civil, Electrical and Mechanical Engineering. In 1984 Electronics engineering branch was started with 20 student. In 1980 a B.E. (transfer course) was introduced in civil, mechanical and electrical engineering with a capacity of 20 students in each branch to facilitate a graduate degree course for diploma holder students. Looking at the growing demand for Software Engineers across the country Computer Science and Engineering branch was introduced in 2018.

For the academic year of 2022, AICTE approved REC to conduct M.Tech course. Following which three new courses- Thermal Engineering, Transportation Engineering and Power System where introduced in Mechanical, Civil and Electrical Engineering department respectively.

== Organisation and administration ==
=== Governance ===
The institute is governed by Rewa Engineering College Society, Rewa registered by Govt. of MP. The administrative and management functions are accomplished through a General Body and Board of Governors.

=== Departments ===
- Department of Mechanical Engineering
- Department of Civil Engineering
- Department of Electrical Engineering
- Department of Electronics & Communication Engineering
- Department of Computer Science Engineering
- Department of Chemistry
- Department of Physics
- Department of Mathematics

=== Centres ===
- IIT Bombay Remote Centre and Resource Centre
- Centre of Innovation, Incubation, Entrepreneurship and Industry Relations.
- Training and Placement
- Central Workshop

== Academics ==
REC Rewa offer undergraduate and postgraduate programs in following engineering fields:

Degree	Specialization
Bachelor of Technology (B.Tech)	Civil Engineering, Computer Science Engineering, Electrical Engineering, Electronics and Communication Engineering, Mechanical Engineering.
Master of Technology (M.Tech)	Thermal Engineering, Transportation Engineering, Power Engineering.

=== Admissions ===
Students are admitted into the various B.Tech. programs through the national level engineering entrance examination Joint Entrance Examination - Main (JEE (Main)).

Admission to the M.Tech programs is done through Graduate Aptitude Test in Engineering (GATE).

== Student life ==
=== Cultural and non-academic activities ===
REC have well cultivated culture of clubs cells. There are mainly seven clubs in REC-

- Catalyst E-cell

The very first club established in 2015. E-Cell is an entrepreneurial cell of the college, which is responsible for conducting entrepreneurial activities throughout the campus.

- REC Pedia

Official Media House and Event Organizing Body of REC. It was established in 2018 and has been growing tremendously since then.

- Technical Club

Tech club promotes technical activities in the college like circuit designing, coding quests, etc.

- Abhiruchi Club

Abhiruchi club is dedicated in promoting a vibrant campus experience by conducting several arts and cultural activities.

- REC Design Club

Established in 2019 as SAEINDIA Collegiate Club. This club is indulged in activities to promote designing and making of automobiles.

- Sports Club

Responsible for conducting various sports event in the college and also helps students to play for nodal and state-level competitions.

- 3rd - Eye Photography Club

This is a photography and videography club of college which carves out the best photographers of REC.

- Project Club

Fests organized annually are-

- AARAMBH
- PENTAQUEST

== Achievements ==
- REC student Mohammad Sultan Sheikh secured All India Rank 13 in GATE Exam 2022.
- REC Rewa secured First place in Smart India Hackathon organized by AICTE at KIT College of Engineering on August 26, 2022.

== Notable alumni ==
- Rajendra Shukla – Deputy Chief Minister of Madhya Pradesh
