= Dr. A. P. J. Abdul Kalam University =

Private university in Madhya Pradesh, India

- Motto: "Nurturing talents to success"
- Type: Private
- Established: 2016
- Affiliations: UGC
- Chancellor: Dr. Shruti Kapoor
- Vice-Chancellor: D. P. Tiwari
- Location: Indore, Madhya Pradesh, India; 22.7973°N 75.9276°E
- Colors: Red and White
- Website: aku.ac.in

Dr. A. P. J. Abdul Kalam University is a private university in Indore, Madhya Pradesh, India. It is named after A.P.J. Abdul Kalam, the former President of India.

== See also ==
- List of universities in India
- List of institutions of higher education in Madhya Pradesh
