= Shri Venkateshwara University =

University in Gajraula, Uttar Pradesh

- Type: Private
- Affiliations: UGC
- Chancellor: Sudhir Giri
- Vice-Chancellor: Krishna Kant Dave
- Location: Gajraula, Uttar Pradesh, India
- Campus: Urban
- Website: www.svu.edu.in

Shri Venkateshwara University (SVU) is a private university located in Gajraula, Uttar Pradesh, India. The university was established in 2010 through the Shri Venkateshwara University Uttar Pradesh Act, 2010 as a venture of the Venkateshwara Group of Institutions. SVU offers courses in the fields of engineering, architecture, business studies, medical science, design and language and cultural studies, among others.

== Schools ==
- Medical Sciences
- Paramedical Sciences
- Pharmaceutical Sciences
- Nursing
- Applied Sciences
- Commerce & Management
- Engineering & Technology
- Human Languages & Social Sciences
- Education
- Library & Information Sciences
- Law & Jurisprudence
- Agriculture
- Pharmacy

== Collaborations ==
In October 2021, the university entered into collaboration with the First Aid Council of India to conduct first aid courses. The courses include certificate and diploma courses such as Certificate in First Aid Treatment and First Aid Specialist Diploma Course.
