= Nowgong, Chhatarpur =

Nowgong Nowgaon chhawni (cantt) Nowgaon
- City
- Location within Madhya Pradesh
- Coordinates: 25.0574°N 79.4381°E
- Country: India
- State: Madhya Pradesh
- District: Chhatarpur
- Subdistrict: Nowgong

Government
  - Type: Municipal council government
  - MLA: Kamakhya Pratap Singh Bhartiya Janata Party
  - MP: Virendra Kumar Khatik Bharatiya Janata Party

Population (2011)
  - Total: 40,580
- Time zone: UTC+05:30 (IST)
- Pincode: 471201
- Area code: 07685
- Vehicle registration: MP 16

Nowgong is a city of Chhatarpur district of Madhya Pradesh. The town had a population of 11,507 in 1952. Vindhya Pradesh ( विंध्य प्रदेश) was merged into Madhya Pradesh on 1 November 1956. Nowgaon was declared capital of Madhya Pradesh, but after six months Bhopal became the capital of Madhya Pradesh.

Nowgong is well connected by roads and is on National Highway 39 about 110 km away from Jhansi. The nearest railway station is Chhatarpur, 28–30 km away and the nearest airport is Khajuraho, 68 km away. The town has an old British-era Church.

The city was an important center during British rule when it was the headquarters of the Bundelkhand Agency. The town hosted a military cantonment with accommodation for all forces, the Kitchener College (for soldiers being trained to become officers), and had a school for the wards of the chiefs of Central India (1872–1898), in addition to being the headquarters of the Political Assistant of the Agency.

== History of Nowgong ==
Cantonment of Nowgong was established in 1842–43 when Kaitha in the Hamirpur was given up to British ruler. On the sight of 4 villages named Nayagaon, Bilerhi, Dudri & Pipri and is named after the first village in 1869. More land was acquired from the Chattarpur State and Cantonment was enlarged. In 1859 Nowgong was made first headquarters of the Bundelkhand Political Agency. The earlier records of this agency were destroyed in the mutiny of 1857 later on post acquiring the area, British has started establishing the place by setting up markets and also colonized the place. These also made State Houses for representatives of different States of Bundelkhand.

== Climate ==
Climate data for Nowgong (1991–2020, extremes 1901–2020)
Month	Jan	Feb	Mar	Apr	May	Jun	Jul	Aug	Sep	Oct	Nov	Dec	Year
Record high °C (°F)	33.0 (91.4)	37.7 (99.9)	42.2 (108.0)	46.4 (115.5)	48.8 (119.8)	48.3 (118.9)	45.6 (114.1)	40.7 (105.3)	39.8 (103.6)	40.3 (104.5)	37.4 (99.3)	33.5 (92.3)	48.8 (119.8)
Mean daily maximum °C (°F)	23.5 (74.3)	27.4 (81.3)	34.1 (93.4)	39.5 (103.1)	43.0 (109.4)	40.4 (104.7)	34.2 (93.6)	32.3 (90.1)	33.1 (91.6)	34.3 (93.7)	30.4 (86.7)	26.0 (78.8)	33.1 (91.6)
Mean daily minimum °C (°F)	7.2 (45.0)	10.0 (50.0)	15.2 (59.4)	20.7 (69.3)	26.0 (78.8)	27.2 (81.0)	25.2 (77.4)	24.1 (75.4)	23.0 (73.4)	18.1 (64.6)	12.2 (54.0)	8.2 (46.8)	17.9 (64.2)
Record low °C (°F)	−1.7 (28.9)	−0.6 (30.9)	4.9 (40.8)	10.0 (50.0)	13.9 (57.0)	18.4 (65.1)	17.4 (63.3)	16.3 (61.3)	14.9 (58.8)	8.4 (47.1)	1.9 (35.4)	−1.7 (28.9)	−1.7 (28.9)
Average rainfall mm (inches)	12.3 (0.48)	14.3 (0.56)	11.1 (0.44)	6.9 (0.27)	11.3 (0.44)	104.9 (4.13)	321.7 (12.67)	317.6 (12.50)	179.3 (7.06)	28.0 (1.10)	7.5 (0.30)	5.1 (0.20)	1,020 (40.16)
Average rainy days	1.1	1.2	1.1	0.8	1.1	5.3	13.4	13.4	7.8	1.2	0.6	0.4	47.4
Average relative humidity (%) (at 17:30 IST)	55	48	35	27	24	43	70	77	69	48	49	55	50
Source: India Meteorological Department

== Education and training ==
- Nowgong Polytechnic College formerly known as Government Polytechnic College Nowgong (1st Polytechnic College in Bundelkhand) was established on 2 October 1952. The College campus is spread over an area of 14 Hectares.
- Kitchener College (closed) 1929-1964. Became Army Cadet College in 1960 and relocated to Pune in 1964. It used to run a 2 year preparatory course for The Indian Army and graduates went on to The Indian Military Academy, Dehradun (IMA), The Officer's Training School.
- The King George's School Nowgong 1952–1960 (in the buildings of the Kitchener College). Relocated to Chail as the Chail Military School in 1960.
- District Institute of Education and Training.
- Government Degree College.
- Government Engineering College (2012) - It is a Government Autonomous College situated at Newra Pahadi. 1st batch was admitted in 2013.
- Jawahar Lal Nehru Navodaya Vidyalaya.
- Government Fisheries Research and Training Institute.
- Govt. T.B. Hospital.
- Govt. Sales Tax Office, Nowgong.
- Government Nagar Palika Office.
- Government P.W.D. Office.
- Division Water Resources Office.
- Malaria Office, Nowgong (Chhatarpur and Tikamgarh District).
- S.D.O.P. Office City Kotwali, Nowgong.

=== Private schools ===
- B.S. PUBLIC VIDHYA NIKETAN (Affiliated CBSE) Mahoa Road, Nowgong, Madhya Pradesh.
- Takshashila Public Model School (Affiliated to C.B.S.E.) Nagar Palika Chauraha.
- DPS Junior World play School, Near Siddeswar Dhaam Mandir Garroli Road.
- Angel Public School (English Medium) in front of Club. It is also known as Panna House.
- Lead India Public School
- GCM Convent Senior Secondary School (CBSE-English Medium) near Mahoba Road.
- R. S. Memorial Public School (English Medium) near Ramleela Ground.
- Sunrise International School (English Medium) near Pipri Road.
- Acharya Shriram Vidhyalaya (CBSE English Medium) near Badi Devi Mata.
- Balaji Aadarsh Vidhyalaya (Hindi–English Medium).
- R.S. Modern English School (C.B.S.E.) near before Tidni Tiraha, Chhatarpur Road.
- S.B. Palibal English School (C.B.S.E.) near before Tidni Tiraha, Chhatarpur Road.
- Nalanda Public School near Sabji Mandi.
- Kidzee Play School in front of Allahabad Bank.
- Maharishi Vidhya Mandir School near Church.

== Government colleges ==
- Engineering College, Nowgong
- Polytechnic College. * GOVERNMENT CENTRAL SCHOOL NOWGONG (PROJECTED).
- Government Degree College.
- State Bank of India Rural Self Employment Training Institute (SBI-RSETI) BKD.
- Government Krishi Vigyan Kendra.
- Government Pan Anusandhan Kendra.
- Government Mitti Parikshan Kendra.
- Government Fisheries Research and Training Institute. It is the only Institute in entire Madhya Pradesh.
- Government Prashikshan Kendra Nowgong (Bilehri Road).
- Government Bank Prashikshan Kendra Nowgong (Garroli Road) It has only 3 Branches in entire Madhya Pradesh.
- District Institute of Education and Training.
- Government Panchayat Training Kendra (Pipari Road).

== Private colleges ==
- Sunrise College
- Balaji College
- R.S. College
- Career College
- Shri Ram College
- Shri Ganesh Private I.T.I. College Nowgong near Ishanagar Chouraha.
- Ramraja private I.T.I. College Nowgong near Tidni Tiraha, Chhatarpur Road.
- Navyug Private I.T.I. College Nowgong near B.T.I. College
- BHAGINI NIVEDITA SHIKHA SAMITI. (Skill Development Institute) run by Nagar Palika Parishad Nowgong. Its Director is Mr. Mohsin Khan.
