= Oriental Institute of Science and Technology =

Engineering college in Bhopal, Madhya Pradesh, India

Oriental Institute of Science & Technology, Bhopal( OIST)
- Type: Private, RGPV Affiliated
- Established: 1995
- Founder: K L Thakral
- Chairman: Praveen Thakral
- Undergraduates: 1800+
- Location: Bhopal, Madhya Pradesh, India; 23.246°N 77.502°E
- Campus: 51 acres (21 ha)
- Website: www.oistbpl.com

Oriental Institute of Science & Technology (OIST) is a private engineering college located in Bhopal, Madhya Pradesh, India, owned by the private group "Oriental Group of Institutes". It is affiliated with the Rajiv Gandhi Proudyogiki Vishwavidyalaya.

The institutes of the group are only located in Bhopal, Indore, and Jabalpur. The institutes of Bhopal and Jabalpur campus are affiliated to Rajiv Gandhi Proudyogiki Vishwavidyalaya (RGPV), Bhopal while the institutes of Indore campus are affiliated to Oriental University (OU), Indore.

It admits students through JEE/PET/AIEEE/MAT/Pre-MCA and counseling conducted by the State Universities and MHRD. It offers courses in Computer Science and Engineering (CSE), Information Technology (IT), Electronics and Communication (EC), Electrical and electronic engineering, Automotive engineering, Mechanical Engineering (ME), Civil engineering, and MCA (Masters in Computer Application). In 2020, two new branches were added - BTech in CSBS (Computer Science and Business System) and BTech in Artificial Intelligence and Data Science.

== Admissions ==
For the undergraduate course, the admission is through the national-level engineering entrance examination: JEE-Mains or Qualifying Exam (XII). For the postgraduate courses, the institute claims that entry is through GATE for MTech, NIMCET for MCA or through an institute-conducted entrance test.

== Training & placement ==
The institute started campus placement from its first batch in 1998. Major recruiters include TCS, Cognizant, Infosys, Tech Mahindra, Wipro, Capgemini, Syntel, L&T Infotech, Avaya, US Technologies, Zensar, Mu Sigma, Amdocs, UST Global, Zycus, Yodlee, Sears Holdings, Persistent Systems, Aon Hewitt, Mphasis, Atos, etc., Students in Computer Science / Information Technology get placed in TCS, Wipro and Infosys and other branches have very few placement ratio.

== Shooting of Films ==
Two of noted writer, director and producer Prakash Jha's films Rajneeti and Jai Lava Kusa were shot in the OIST campus. 300 students of the institute were part of Aarakshan. Several years Later, the Dharma Productions films Dhadak 2 and Homebound were also shot in the same campus.

== See also ==
- List of educational institutions in Bhopal
