= Sushil Doshi =

Indian sports commentator and journalist

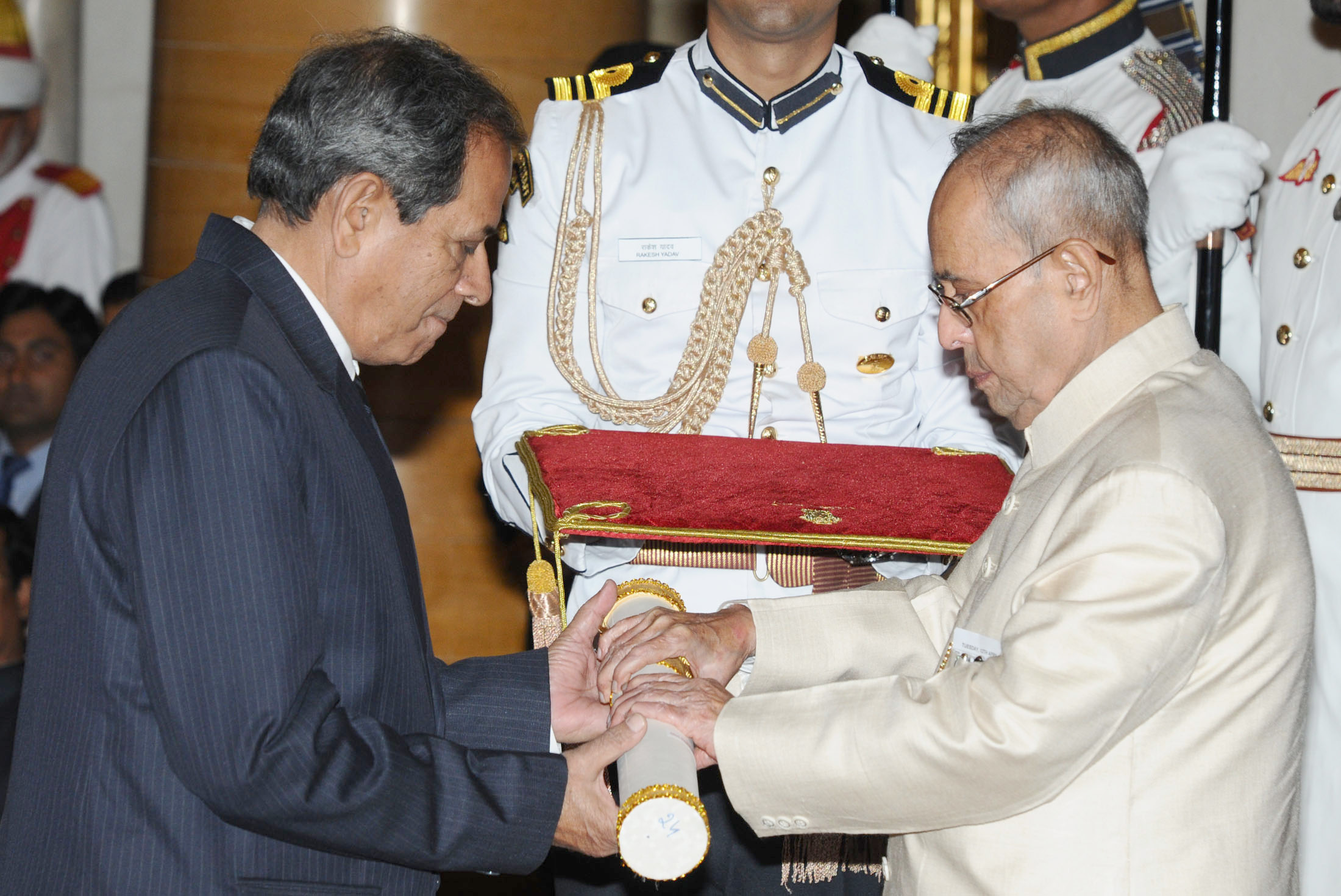
- President Pranab Mukherjee presenting the Padma Shri Award to Sushil Doshi (left) in 2016
- Born: Indore, Madhya Pradesh, India
- Education: Shri Govindram Seksaria Institute of Technology and Science (SGSITS) Indore
- Occupations: Sports commentator Writer; Engineer
- Known for: Cricket commentary
- Awards: Padma Shri

Sushil Kumar Jain known professionally as Sushil Doshi is an Indian journalist, writer, sports commentator and the first cricket commentator in Hindi. Born to Niranjanlal and Madan Kunwar at Indore, in the second largest Indian city of Madhya Pradesh, he graduated in engineering from Shri Govindram Seksaria Institute of Technology and Science (SGSITS) Indore and started his commentating career in 1968 at the Nehru Stadium for a Ranji Trophy match between Madhya Pradesh and Rajasthan. Over the years, he is reported to have covered nine Cricket World Cups, 85 test matches and over 400 One Day Internationals, besides several Twenty20 Internationals. His contributions are reported in making cricket commentary in Hindi popular. He has also written two books in Hindi on sports, Khel Patrakarita published in 2003 and Cricket Ka Mahabharat, published in 2016.

== Awards and recognitions ==
The Government of India awarded him the fourth highest civilian honour of the Padma Shri, in 2016, for his contributions to sports. The commentators' box at Holkar Stadium, Indore has been named Sushil Doshi Commentators' Box in his honor.

== See also ==
- Holkar Stadium
- Munir Hussain
