= Deepak B. Phatak =

Indian academician born 1948)

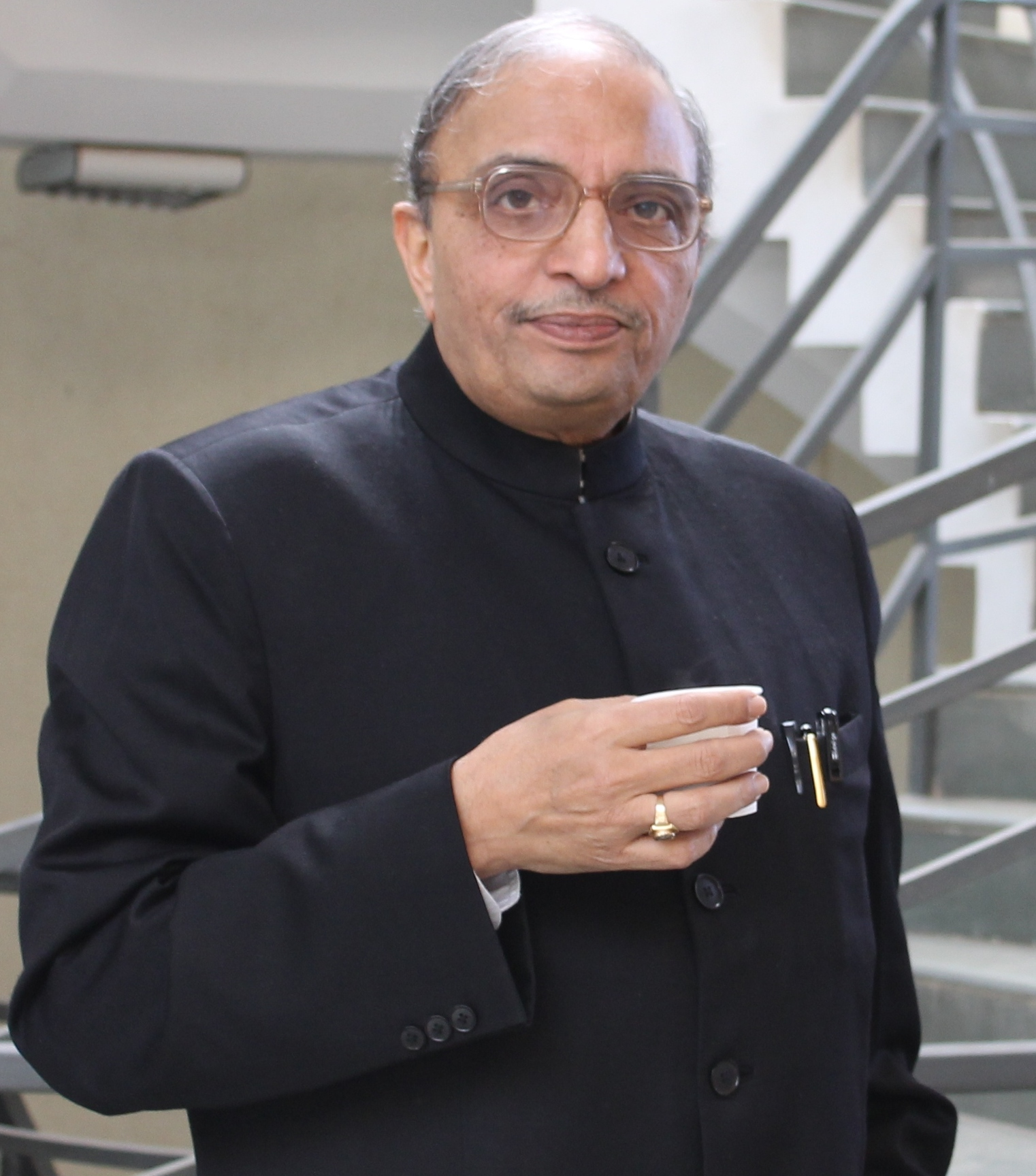
- Born: 2 April 1948 (age 78); India
- Education: B.E (EE), MTech (EE), PhD (CS)
- Occupations: Teacher and researcher
- Spouse: Pratibha Phatak
- Children: 2
- Awards: Padma Shri (2013)
- Scientific career
- Fields: Computer science
- Workplaces: Indian Institute of Technology Bombay, Shri Govindram Seksaria Institute of Technology and Science (SGSITS) Indore

Deepak B. Phatak (born 2 April 1948) is an Indian computer scientist and academic, and a recipient of the Padma Shri Award for his contribution in science and technology in 2013. He is known for his notable work for upgrading Aakash, advertised by its manufacturer as the 'world's cheapest tablet'. In 2009, he was ranked one of the 50 most powerful people in India.

Phatak completed secondary school at Dayanand Arya Vidyalaya, graduated third in his class with a degree in electrical engineering from Shri Govindram Seksaria Institute of Technology and Science (SGSITS) Indore, completed his master of engineering (specialising in instrumentation, control and computers), and received his PhD in computer science from Indian Institute of Technology Bombay. His thesis was titled Digital Simulation and Identification of Linear Continuous Systems.

== Career ==
Born in April 1948, Phatak obtained his bachelor's degree in electrical engineering from SGSITS Indore in 1969, and his M Tech and Ph D from IIT Bombay. Phatak has worked at IIT Bombay since 1 December 1971. From 1991 to 1994, he was the Head of the Department of Computer Science; from 1995 to 1998, he was the Dean of Resource Development; from 1998 to 2002, he was the Head of the Kanwal Rekhi School of Information Technology; in 2004 and 2005, he was head of Shailesh J Mehta School of Management; and he is currently the Subrao Nilekani Chair Professor of the KReSIT/department of CSE.

In 1983 and 1984, he was part of a deputation to Shri Govindram Seksaria Institute of Technology and Science in Indore to set up computer science programs. During 2003 and 2004, he was on sabbatical leave writing an e-book and touring the country visiting engineering colleges.

== Research interests ==
His research interests include databases and information systems, software engineering, system performance evaluation, IT enabled education, and IT strategy planning. He has guided six PhD candidates, over one hundred master's level students, and several bachelor's level students.

== Development projects ==
=== Aircraft maintenance training simulator ===
In the late 1980s, India's Aeronautical Development Agency (ADA) sponsored a program to develop a 'soft panel'-based (that is, personal computer-based) simulator to train technicians and engineers in the rigorous maintenance procedures required by complex aircraft systems such as were present in the then-new HAL Tejas. 'Hard-panel' training simulators were available only from western markets and were very costly.

The ADA chose Phatak's pilot project over two other options because it permitted greater flexibility. In 1996, work began on a 12-year project to develop a full-fledged product with Computer Vision Laboratories (now known as VISIONLABS). It is now deployed in the Indian Air Force. The ADA has showcased the simulator and it was short-listed for a national award. Dr. A. P. J. Abdul Kalam visited the ADA lab and complimented the team for their successful efforts.

=== Development of smart card technology ===
Recognizing that smart cards are essentially low-cost computers without a monitor or keyboard, Dr Phatak started development of meaningful affordable applications of this technology. In 1996, he initiated a national project to deploy this technology for banking debit-credit applications. The project was supported by Reserve Bank of India, State Bank of India and multiple vendors. It was piloted around the IIT campus through a special permission by RBI. The standard evolved in the project was accepted as a national standard in 1998.

Dr Phatak has continued development work on smart card technology, designing low cost point-of-sale (POS) terminals and a multi-application framework. He was invited to head the national subcommittee for standardisation of multi-application smart cards for payment systems. Specific security issues were addressed and novel deployment schemes were evolved through PhD and MTech level research. The technology, now using the near field communication (NFC) feature built into many modern mobile phones, has been successfully deployed for salary payment to people employed under the National Rural Employment Guarantee Scheme.

=== Surveillance system for the Securities and Exchange Board of India ===
2004–2007 – To prevent and catch malpractices such as insider trading in stock markets, the Securities and Exchange Board of India (SEBI) wanted to deploy a state of art surveillance system. An existing system operational in USA was recommended by experts from the U.S. Agency for International Development, who were advising SEBI.

After consulting Dr Phatak on the question, Indian regulatory provisions. The national surveillance system which has since been implemented, is considered today as one of the best in the world. It has cost less than one third of the original estimate of over Rs. 50 crore, and handles the world's third largest volume of daily trades.

=== Ekalavya Project and e-outreach program ===
Dr Phatak terms all these people modern Ekalavyas, and started a project to help them use modern technology. Initially it aimed to provide web-based mentoring to final year computer engineering students of colleges for their project work. The condition was that they must release their work in open source, so that their work could later be built upon by others. The mentors were initially his research scholars and some industry professionals. This program started receiving annual funding from the industry. Participation has grown from some 100 students from 12 colleges, to more than 3500 students from over 370 colleges supported by over 200 volunteer mentors from industry and academia.

Another important initiative launched by the project is creation and dissemination of open source audio-visual educational content. With his encouragement, the IITB School of Management set up the India Centre for Creative Commons, which provides open source license terms for the content.

Encouraged by the success of that project, Phatak planned a massive pilot project to run a training program sponsored by the Indian Society for Technical Education program, intended to train up to 1,000 engineering teachers across the country simultaneously.

=== Indigenous development of clicker devices ===
Phatak developed a "clicker," a portable, handheld device intended for student or presentation environments, designed to allow participants to submit answers to a quiz or poll by clicking on one of a set number of choices. The instructor uses a wireless receiver that collects answers sent by students' clickers; these are then collected for analysis by custom software.

== Awards ==
- Elected Fellow of the Computer Society of India (CSI) in 1999.
- Elected Fellow of the Institution of Electronic and Telecommunication Engineers IETE in 2000.
- Lifetime achievement award by Skoch Foundation in 2003.
- Lifetime achievement award by Dataquest 2008.
- Listed amongst fifty most powerful Indians by Business week 2009.
- Padma Shri Award for contribution in science and engineering in 2013.
- Lifetime achievement award by IIT Bombay 2014.
- Lifetime achievement award by INTEROP Mumbai 5 Sept 2014

== Professional activity ==
Phatak has a long association with the Computer Society of India (CSI), spanning over two decades. He is a regular participant at major CSI events.

He has been a consultant and adviser to many organisations on various issues related to Information Technology. In the late 1980s he was involved in a major effort by Industrial Development Bank of India to use relational data bases on Unix platforms. He has been an I.T. adviser to the State Bank of India for several years. He has also been a consultant to several other financial and industrial organisations. He works on several advisory committees to government departments on issues related to computerisation.
