= Ratibad (census code 482350) =

- village
- Location within Madhya Pradesh Location within India
- Coordinates: 23.346446°N 77.281946°E
- Country: India
- State: Madhya Pradesh
- District: Bhopal
- Tehsil: Huzur

Population (2011)
  - Total: 434
- Time zone: UTC+5:30 (IST)
- ISO 3166 code: MP-IN
- 2011 census code: 482350

Ratibad is a village in the Bhopal district of Madhya Pradesh, India. It is located in the Huzur tehsil and the Phanda block.

It is located close to the National Highway 12, near Parwaliya Sadak.

== Demographics ==
According to the 2011 census of India, Ratibad has 88 households. The effective literacy rate (i.e. the literacy rate of population excluding children aged 6 and below) is 79.63%.

Demographics (2011 Census)
	Total	Male	Female
Population	434	226	208
Children aged below 6 years	56	24	32
Scheduled caste	49	25	24
Scheduled tribe	4	2	2
Literates	301	186	115
Workers (all)	196	107	89
Main workers (total)	193	106	87
Main workers: Cultivators	113	65	48
Main workers: Agricultural labourers	59	25	34
Main workers: Household industry workers	1	0	1
Main workers: Other	20	16	4
Marginal workers (total)	3	1	2
Marginal workers: Cultivators	0	0	0
Marginal workers: Agricultural labourers	1	0	1
Marginal workers: Household industry workers	0	0	0
Marginal workers: Others	2	1	1
Non-workers	238	119	119
