= Atal Bihari Vajpayee Hindi Vishwavidyalaya =

State University in Madhya Pradesh

Coordinates: 23.367°N 77.461°E

- Type: Public
- Established: 2011
- Affiliations: UGC
- Chancellor: Governor of Madhya Pradesh
- Vice-Chancellor: Khemsingh Daheria
- Location: Bhopal, Madhya Pradesh, India
- Campus: Urban
- Website: www.abvhv.edu.in

Atal Bihari Vajpayee Hindi Vishwavidyalaya is a state university in Bhopal, Madhya Pradesh, India. It was established in December 2011. The university is named after Hindi poet and former Prime minister of India, Atal Bihari Vajpayee. Mohan Lal Chhipa is the first Vice Chancellor of the university.

== Campus ==
As of 2016, the university operates from two rented buildings. Classes are taken at the old Madhya Pradesh Legislative Assembly while administrative functions are help at a building in the Madhya Pradesh Mungalia Kot campus. The foundation stone for a 50 acres (0.20 km^{2}) campus in Mungalia Kot was laid in 2013.

== Hindi language ==
The university is promoting study in the Hindi language. In 2015 they asked the Medical Council of India (MCI) to allow students to write MBBS course papers in Hindi. In 2016 they opened the first engineering course in India to be taught in the Hindi language, although in 2017 the university was considering discontinuing the programme due to lack of students and infrastructure.

== Courses ==
In November 2020, the university introduced First Aid Specialist Diploma course, and other first aid courses in collaboration with the First Aid Council of India (FACI), Delhi. The FACI is presided by Shabab Aalam.
