= First Aid Council of India =

First aid education institute in India

- Abbreviation: FACI
- Formation: 2017; 9 years ago
- Founder: Shabab Aalam
- Purpose: Promotion of first aid education
- Location: Shahdara, India
- President: Shabab Aalam
- Website: faci.ind.in

First Aid Council of India (abbreviated as FACI) is a non-governmental organisation, based at Shahdara, in the Indian union territory of Delhi. It was established by Shabab Aalam, an Indian educationist and author, in 2017, and it aims to promote first aid education in India. It offers certificate and diploma courses in the first aid education with the collaboration of various Indian universities.

== History ==
First Aid Council of India was established by Indian educationist and author Shabab Aalam in 2017 to help promote first aid education in India. It is said that it is based on the idea of Atmanirbhar Bharat. It is headquartered at Shahdara in Delhi.

In November 2020, the Bhopal-based Atal Bihari Vajpayee Hindi University began establishing several study centers with the teaching support of the First Aid Council of India (FACI), to promote first aid education in the state of Madhya Pradesh. The Free Press Journal had reported in October 2020 that the university was about to establish eleven study centers in the state to conduct first aid courses. In October 2021, the Shri Venkateshwara University entered into collaboration with the FACI for conducting first aid courses. Its founder, Shabab Aalam, also serves as its president.

== Reception ==
In December 2020, the Hindustan Times reported doctors and experts condemning the courses conducted by the FACI. They allegedly accused it of promoting quackery. Ramdev Bhardwaj, the vice-chancellor of the Atal Bihari Vajpayee Hindi University, was reported saying that, although several state governments and the central government had many times discussed the proposals about starting courses on first aid education but no institution throughout India had ever introduced one such course and the university was the first institution to have taken the initiative.
