= Prestige Public School =

Prestige Public School, Indore
- Prestige Public School Logo

Location
- Indore, Madhya Pradesh, India
- Coordinates: 22.760°N 75.883°E

Information
- School type: Private, Co-education
- Established: 2004
- Status: Open
- Principal: Mr. Prakash Chaudhary
- Faculty: 300+
- Age: 4 to 17
- Classes offered: Pre Primary to Standard XII
- Language: English
- Campus size: 95-square-metre (1,020 sq ft)
- Campus type: Urban
- Houses: Talented(Yellow), Radiant(Red), Brilliant(Blue), Genius(Green)
- Affiliation: CBSE, CBSE-i
- Acronym: PPS
- Website: http://www.prestigeschool.org/

Prestige Public School (also known as Prestige International School), Indore is a public school located in Indore, India, at Prestige Vihar, Vijay Nagar. The school is affiliated with the Central Board of Secondary Education (CBSE), and CBSE-i (CBSE-International), it is one of the only 50 schools affiliated with CBSEi across India. It recently came up with its new ventures in Dewas (Prestige Public School, Dewas) and Gwalior (Prestige Public School, Gwalior).

== History ==
Prestige Public School with its sister institutions was founded by Shri N. N. Jain in 2004. Its current principal Mr. Prakash Chaudhary was also the former chairman of Indore Sahodaya Group.

== Sister Institutions ==
- Prestige Institute of Management and Research, Indore
- Prestige Institute of Management and Research, (PG), Indore
- Prestige Institute of Management and Research, (UG), Indore
- Prestige Law Department (PIMR), Indore
- Prestige Institute of Engineering and Management Research, Indore
- Prestige International School, Indore
- Prestige Institute of Management, Gwalior
- Prestige Institute of Management, Dewas
- Prestige Public School, Dewas
