= Mansarovar Global University =

Private university in Madhya Pradesh

- Type: Private
- Established: 2018
- Academic affiliations: UGC, MP PURC, MPPC, PCI, BCI, MPNRC
- Chancellor: K. K. Tiwari
- Vice-Chancellor: Dr. Arun Kumar Pandey
- Academic staff: 600
- Administrative staff: 1200
- Students: 4000
- Undergraduates: Yes
- Postgraduates: Yes
- Doctoral students: Yes
- Location: Sehore, Madhya Pradesh, India; 23.078°N 77.255°E
- Campus: 150 acre
- Colors: Blue
- Website: mguindia.com
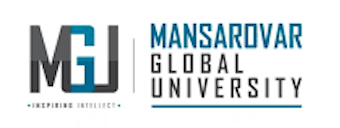

Mansarovar Global University is a private university in Sehore, Madhya Pradesh, India. It was established in 2018 by Sri Sai Gramothan Samiti, Bhopal. Other Institutions Established by Sai Gramothan samiti since 1999 in Bhopal, Madhya Pradesh are : Mansarovar Dental College, Hospital and Research centre, Mansarovar Ayurvedic Medical college, Hospital and Research Centre, Mansarovar Nursing College, Mansarovar College (For Teacher's education), Mansarovar Public School (CBSE), Sri Sai Institute of Ayurvedic Research and Medicine, Sri Sai College of Education and Sri Sai Institute of Nursing Sciences.

- Mansarovar Global University (MGU)
