= Saket Nagar =

- Interactive map of Saket Nagar
- Coordinates: 23°12′34″N 77°26′52″E
- Country: India
- Region: Central India
- Lieutenancy: Madhya Pradesh

Population
  - Total: 205,000
- Postal code: 462024
- Postcode area: Habibganj
- Dialling code: 0755

Saket Nagar is a suburb of Bhopal, India, on the southern side of the city. It is part of Ward 54 of Bhopal Municipal Corporation.

== Etymology ==
In Sanskrit, Saket is the ancient name of the city of Ayodhya, an important Hindu religious place, said to be the place of residence for Lord Rama. Saket is also the name of a famous epic Hindi poetic work of Maithili Sharan Gupt, an account of the Ramayana through the eyes of Urmila.

== Population ==
Saket Nagar is mostly inhabited by retired employees of public sector company BHEL like its adjacent localities Shakti nagar and Alkapuri.

== Education ==
Saket Nagar has two major schools nearby namely the Bhopal Public School and Sagar Public School.

== Health ==
The All India Institute of Medical Sciences has a medical research public university located in the Saket Nagar suburb. It is one of the seven AIIMS established by the Ministry of Health and Family Welfare under the Pradhan Mantri Swasthya Suraksha Yojna (PMSSY).
