= Barkatullah University =

State University in Madhya Pradesh

Coordinates: 23.201°N 77.454°E

- Former name: University of Bhopal
- Type: Public
- Established: 1970; 56 years ago
- Affiliations: UGC, NAAC, BCI, NBA
- Chancellor: Governor of Madhya Pradesh
- Vice-Chancellor: S. K. Jain
- Location: Bhopal, Madhya Pradesh, India
- Campus: URBAN
- Website: bubhopal.ac.in

Barkatullah University is a public university in Bhopal, Madhya Pradesh, India, formally known as University of Bhopal, and informally known as Bhopal University. It was named after Barkatullah, one of the freedom fighters in Bhopal. Barkatullah University has been accredited as a A category university by the National Assessment and Accreditation Council (NAAC).

== History ==
The university was founded in 1970 as Bhopal University. It was renamed Barkatullah University in 1988. The university is a teaching and an affiliating institution. In 1974–75, the Institute of Open and Distance Education was established with the permission of the UGC for distance education.

== Campus ==
The campus of Barkatullah University covers 360 acres (1.5 km^{2}). It is on the National Highway 12, which passes through Bhopal. It is a residential-type campus and, apart from the quarters for the vice-chancellor and the staff, there are four hostels for boys and a hostel for girls.

On the campus, there are buildings for departments such as the Institute of Physics and Electronics, Department of Pharmacy, University Institute of Technology, Management Institute, Department of Law, Psychology Department, etc. It houses an administrative building, a guest house, an auditorium and a playground.

The Barkatullah University, Bhopal, has made available an exclusive area of 12 hectares (30 acres) out of the available 350 acres of land on the campus for building its instructional and administrative area. Presently the institute functions in buildings with a built up area of 9828 sq m. Moreover, construction of 7000 sq m for the instructional area and another 1000 sq m for workshop are being processed.

Additionally boarding facilities for 130 boys and 40 girls are available in the hostels on the campus. The institute shares facilities of the Health Center, the Computer Centre, Library, Sports and Games fields, Gymnasium, Cultural Hall & Auditorium, etc. Banking and Post Office facilities are available on the campus. An online testing facility for 60 students is in the institute for campus placement.

Barkatullah University Stadium is a proposed cricket stadium. The stadium will be on 35 to 40 acres of land with a 440-meter of pavilion, 75 meter boundary with ten wickets and parking space of 50,000 vehicles.

== Organisation and administration ==
=== Faculties ===
There are 10 faculties in the college and 23 teaching departments.

- Faculty of Arts
- Faculty of Commerce
- Faculty of Education
- Faculty of Physical Education
- Faculty of Law
- Faculty of Life Sciences
- Faculty of Management
- Faculty of Physical Sciences
- Faculty of Social Sciences
- Faculty of Engineering
- Institute of Open and Distance Learning

The courses are offered in the 64 government colleges and 159 private colleges that are affiliated to the university in the above-mentioned eight districts.

==== Chakravarti Rajgopalachari Institute of Management ====
The management college of Barkatullah was set up in 1979. Chakravarti Rajgopalachari Institute of Management, or CRIM, offers a two-year full-time postgraduate programme in Management (MBA). Entry to this programme is regulated through a rigorous selection process conducted by VYAPAM and competitive business scenario.

== Academics ==
=== Academic programmes ===
There are postgraduate courses, certificate courses, diploma courses, M.Phil. programmes, post-doctoral fellowship, etc. which meet regional and national needs. In addition to the conventional courses, the university offers several innovative and job-oriented courses at the postgraduate level. Most of these courses are non-traditional and interdisciplinary. There are 100 academic programmes, covering postgraduate and undergraduate courses. There are 26 self-financing courses offered.

== See also ==
- List of educational institutions in Bhopal
- University Institute of Technology RGPV
