= Vikrant University =

Private university in Gwalior, India

Coordinates: 26°14′43″N 78°18′46″E

- Type: Private university
- Established: 2022
- Affiliations: UGC
- Chancellor: Rakesh Singh Rathore
- Vice-Chancellor: Dr. Atul Kumar
- Location: Gwalior, Madhya Pradesh, India
- Campus: Urban
- Website: vikrantuniversity.ac.in

Vikrant University is a private university located in Gwalior, Madhya Pradesh, India. It was established in 2022 under the Madhya Pradesh Private University (Establishment and Operation) Act, 2022 (Act No. 25 of 2022). The university is listed as a recognized private university by the University Grants Commission of India.

== History ==
Vikrant University was established in 2022 following the passage of the Madhya Pradesh Private University Act, 2022 by the Government of Madhya Pradesh.

In 2025, the university signed a memorandum of understanding with Kisan Munafa to support initiatives in agri-tech innovation.

== Academic profile ==
The university offers undergraduate, postgraduate, and doctoral programs in fields such as engineering, management, law, agriculture, science, pharmacy, and allied disciplines.

== Recognition ==
Vikrant University is listed by the University Grants Commission as a private university under Section 2(f) of the UGC Act, India.
