= Parwaliya Sadak =

- village
- Location within Madhya Pradesh Location within India
- Coordinates: 23.3359857°N 77.2755205°E
- Country: India
- State: Madhya Pradesh
- District: Bhopal
- Tehsil: Huzur
- Elevation: 510 m (1,670 ft)

Population (2011)
  - Total: 3,310
- Time zone: UTC+5:30 (IST)
- ISO 3166 code: MP-IN
- 2011 census code: 482354

Parwaliya Sadak is a village in the Bhopal district of Madhya Pradesh, India. It is located in the Huzur tehsil and the Phanda block.

== Demographics ==
According to the 2011 census of India, Parwaliya Sadak has 717 households. The effective literacy rate (i.e. the literacy rate of population excluding children aged 6 and below) is 69.68%.

Demographics (2011 Census)
	Total	Male	Female
Population	3310	1716	1594
Children aged below 6 years	536	259	277
Scheduled caste	616	312	304
Scheduled tribe	198	103	95
Literates	1933	1154	779
Workers (all)	1310	896	414
Main workers (total)	1064	840	224
Main workers: Cultivators	186	162	24
Main workers: Agricultural labourers	612	461	151
Main workers: Household industry workers	19	18	1
Main workers: Other	247	199	48
Marginal workers (total)	246	56	190
Marginal workers: Cultivators	16	4	12
Marginal workers: Agricultural labourers	181	27	154
Marginal workers: Household industry workers	3	0	3
Marginal workers: Others	46	25	21
Non-workers	2000	820	1180
