= Indore Institute of Science and Technology =

- Academic affiliations: Rajiv Gandhi Proudyogiki Vishwavidyalaya and Devi Ahilya Vishwavidyalaya
- Location: Indore, Madhya Pradesh, India

Indore Institute of Science and Technology, Indore is a college in Indore Madhya Pradesh, India. It was established in 2003. It is affiliated to Rajiv Gandhi Proudyogiki Vishwavidyalaya (RGPV) for B Tech in CS/ECE/IT/ME/CM/CE and ME in Computer Science/Digital Communication/Machine Design, B Pharm and M Pharm courses and Devi Ahilya Vishwavidyalaya (DAVV) for BBA (FT), BCom, B.Sc. (Maths, Stats, Comp Science), BA(Hons) Economics and Master of Business Administration (MBA) courses.

The institute also offers undergraduate programs in various engineering disciplines such as Computer Science and Engineering, Artificial Intelligence and Machine Learning, Internet of Things and Cybersecurity including Blockchain, Robotics and Artificial Intelligence Chemical Engineering, Electronics and Communication Engineering, Mechanical Engineering, Civil Engineering, and Information Technology. It offers postgraduate programs in Computer Science and Engineering, Machine Design and Digital Communications.
