= Mungalia Kot =

- village
- Location within Madhya Pradesh Location within India
- Coordinates: 23.3571155°N 77.4644607°E
- Country: India
- State: Madhya Pradesh
- District: Bhopal
- Tehsil: Huzur
- Elevation: 500 m (1,600 ft)

Population (2011)
  - Total: 988
- Time zone: UTC+5:30 (IST)
- ISO 3166 code: MP-IN
- 2011 census code: 482419

Mungalia Kot is a village in the Bhopal district of Madhya Pradesh, India. It is located in the Huzur tehsil and the Phanda block.

== Demographics ==
According to the 2011 census of India, Mungalia Kot has 194 households. The effective literacy rate (i.e. the literacy rate of population excluding children aged 6 and below) is 59.98%.

Demographics (2011 Census)
	Total	Male	Female
Population	988	500	488
Children aged below 6 years	186	88	98
Scheduled caste	349	177	172
Scheduled tribe	0	0	0
Literates	481	294	187
Workers (all)	473	266	207
Main workers (total)	452	261	191
Main workers: Cultivators	66	38	28
Main workers: Agricultural labourers	374	217	157
Main workers: Household industry workers	0	0	0
Main workers: Other	12	6	6
Marginal workers (total)	21	5	16
Marginal workers: Cultivators	0	0	0
Marginal workers: Agricultural labourers	20	5	15
Marginal workers: Household industry workers	0	0	0
Marginal workers: Others	1	0	1
Non-workers	515	234	281
