= Engineering College, Nowgong =

Engineering college in Madhya Pradesh

Nowgong Engineering College Nowgong
- Type: Public
- Established: 2012
- Website: www.necnowgong.in

Engineering College Nowgong or Nowgong Engineering College (NEC) is a government autonomous engineering college established by government of Madhya Pradesh in 2012.

Initially, the college functioned from a temporary campus in the Government Polytechnic College Nowgong but later shifted to a newly built 200-acre campus.

The college Initially offered mechanical engineering and civil engineering but later a number of courses were added.

== Workshops ==
The college holds workshops every year in the month of September. Students from every department get benefited via the experience they get during such events.

== History ==
Nowgong college was established in the year 2012 by the government of Madhya Pradesh and was declared as autonomous institution in the same year. The founder principal of this college was RP Tiwari, who served from 2012 to 2015. It is one of the five government autonomous engineering colleges in Madhya Pradesh.The then chief minister of Madhya Pradesh Shivaraj Singh Chauhan inaugurated the college in 2013.

== Campus ==
The campus spreads over an area of 200 acres on NH 75, which is one of the largest college campuses in Madhya Pradesh. The campus is built on the side of Naura Hills.
