= People's University (Bhopal) =

Private university in Madhya Pradesh, India

People’s University
- Motto: Nurturing Humanity through Health & Educational Excellence.
- Type: Private university
- Established: 4 May 2011
- Affiliations: UGC
- Chancellor: Suresh N. Vijaywargia
- Vice-Chancellor: Dr. Harish Rao
- Location: Bhopal, Madhya Pradesh, India; 23.299°N 77.423°E
- Campus: Urban
- Website: peoplesuniversity.edu.in

People's University is a private university located at Bhopal, Madhya Pradesh, India. It was established in 2011.

== History ==
People's University was established on 4 May 2011 through the Madhya Pradesh Niji Vishwavidyalay(Sthapana Ewam Sanchalan) Sanshodhan Adhiniyam, 2011, which also established Oriental University and ITM University.

== Constituent institutes ==
The university includes the following constituent institutes:

- People's College of Medical Sciences and Research Centre
- People's College of Dental Sciences & Research Centre
- People's Dental Academy
- School of Research & Technology
- People's Institute Of Management & Research
- People's Institute of Hotel Management, Catering Technology & Applied Nutrition
- School of Pharmacy & Research
- People's College of Paramedical Science And Research Centre
- People's College of Nursing & Research Centre
