= Shabab Aalam =

Indian educationist (born 1984)

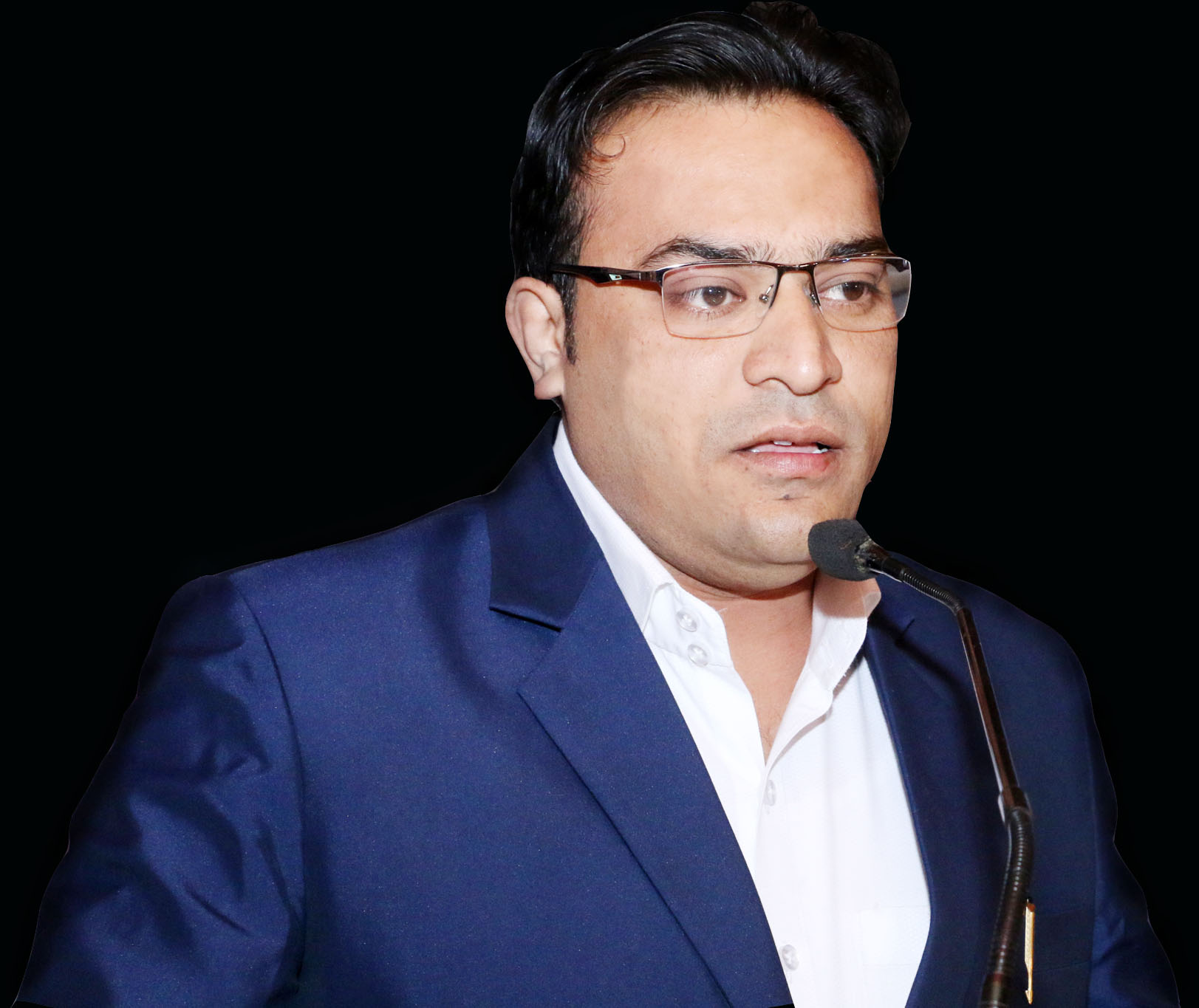
- Born: 15 August 1984 (age 41); Muzaffarnagar, Uttar Pradesh, India
- Occupation: Educationalist
- Known for: Grameen Mukt Vidhyalayi Shiksha Sansthan; First Aid Council of India
- Website: drshababaalam.com

Shabab Aalam (born 15 August 1984) is an Indian author, educationalist and a poet of Hindi and Urdu language. He established the Grameen Mukt Vidhyalayi Shiksha Sansthan, the First Aid Council of India, and serves as the president of the latter. He received the Meezan Talimi Khidmat Award in 2018.

== Biography ==
Shabab Aalam was born on 15 August 1984 in Muzaffarnagar, Uttar Pradesh. He received his primary education at local schools and then travelled to Meerut for higher studies and graduated with a B.A. in Geography. He holds an M.A., an MBA and a PhD degree. He studied Urdu poetry with Nawaz Deobandi.

Aalam has written several poems in Hindi language. In 2015, he established the Grameen Mukt Vidhyalayi Shiksha Sansthan, an alternate educational board that runs on the pattern as the National Institute of Open Schooling. This institute was awarded the Best Distance Learning Centre award in 2020. In 2017, he established the First Aid Council of India (FACI) to promote first aid education in India. He serves as the president of the FACI.

Aalam's several books are recommended readings in certain Indian universities. He was conferred with the 2017 Meezan Talimi Khidmat Award.

In 2023, Aalam was awarded an honorary doctorate by the European University College in Colombo.

== Filmography ==
Aalam has composed lyrics for several songs.

=== Songs ===
Year	Song	Singer	Reference
2022	Rabba Ve	Mohd Danish	
2022	Habibi	Mohd Danish	

== Bibliography ==
- Sadiyah, Humairah (30 October 2021). "ڈاکٹر شباب عالم اور ان کی خدمات پر ایک طائرانہ نظر" [A look at Dr Shabab Aalam and his contributions]. Baseerat Online (in Urdu).
- Zahoor, Rakhshanda (26 November 2021). "Unemployment crisis and the First Aid Council of India". The Chenab Times.
