= Sushila Devi Bansal College of Technology =

- सुशीला देवी बंसल प्रौद्योगिकी महाविद्यालय
- Other names: S.D. Bansal; SD Bansal; SDBCT
- Motto in English: Ever moving forward
- Type: Private
- Established: 2005
- Affiliations: Rajiv Gandhi Proudyogiki Vishwavidyalaya; Devi Ahilya Vishwavidyalaya
- Chairman: Anil Bansal
- Director: Dr. P S Chouhan
- Location: Near Agra-Bombay road, Umeriya, Rau, Indore, Madhya Pradesh, 453331, India; 22°37′16.9″N 75°48′13.8″E
- Campus: Urban
- Language: Hindi
- Colours: Red
- Website: sdbct.ac.in

Sushila Devi Bansal College of Technology (SDBCT or S.D. Bansal) is a private engineering and management institute in Indore, India mainly offering graduate and post-graduate courses in engineering and management programmes. the college is approved by AICTE and affiliated to RGPV, Bhopal and DAVV, Indore. It is an institute of the Bansal Group. It was established in 2005. The site chosen for the institute was Umariya, (15 km) from the city of Indore, with an area of 44 acres (180,000 m^{2}).

== Departments ==
Sushila Devi Bansal College of Technology has six departments:

- Computer Science and Engineering
- Electronics and Communications
- Information Technology
- Mechanical Engineering
- Civil Engineering
- Master of Business Administration
