= All India Institute of Medical Sciences, Bhopal =

Medical university in Madhya Pradesh, India

- Motto: Shareera Madhyam Khalu Dharma Sadhanam (Sanskrit)
- Motto in English: A healthy body is the means of fulfillment of dharma that is duty
- Type: Public Medical University
- Established: 2012; 14 years ago
- President: Dr. Ashok Kumar Mahapatra
- Director: Lt. Gen. (Dr.) Narendra Kotwal, AVSM, SM, VSM (Retd.)
- Faculty: 225 in Medical College, 11 in Nursing College, 500 Non Faculty Staff, 1500 Nursing Staff
- Students: 687
- Undergraduates: 498
- Postgraduates: 174
- Doctoral students: 15
- Location: Saket Nagar, Bhopal, Madhya Pradesh, 462020, India; 23.210628°N 77.457449°E
- Campus: 170 acres; Urban
- Website: www.aiimsbhopal.edu.in

All India Institute of Medical Sciences Bhopal (AIIMS Bhopal) is a medical research public university and Institute of National Importance, located in the Saket Nagar suburb of Bhopal, Madhya Pradesh, India. It is one of the All India Institutes of Medical Sciences (AIIMS) established by the Ministry of Health and Family Welfare under the Pradhan Mantri Swasthya Suraksha Yojna (PMSSY).

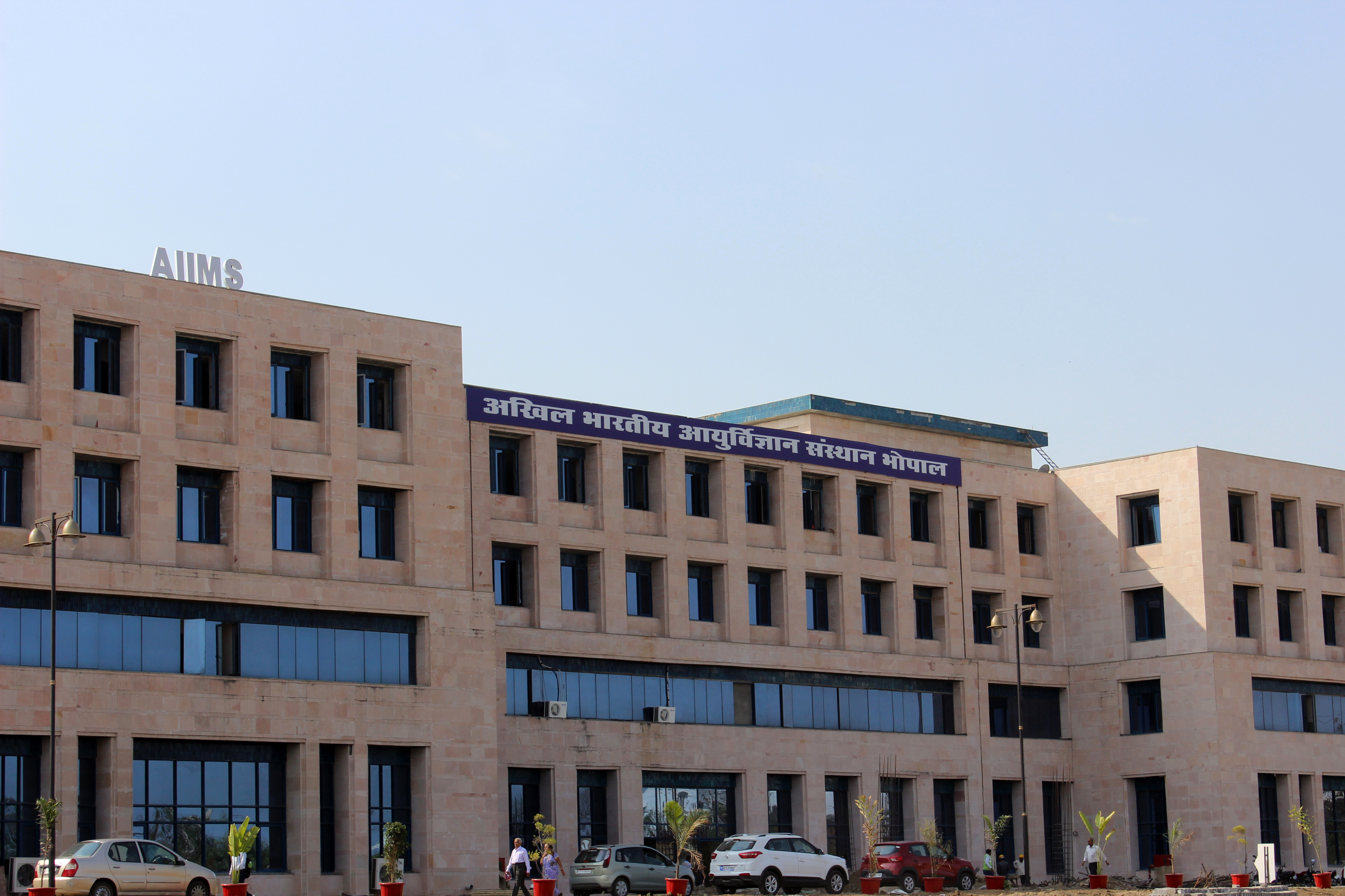
AIIMS Bhopal Building

== History ==
In 2003, Central government decided to set up new AIIMS at Rishikesh, Bhopal, Patna, Jodhpur, Bhubaneswar and Raipur Though the announcement was made in 2003 during Atal Bihari Vajpayee's tenure, the project was delayed owing to the power shift at the centre. AIIMS Bhopal launched its first academic department, community and family medicine (CFM) in September 2012, formed its Institute Body (IB), in July 2013 and started post graduation courses in January 2017.

== Achievements ==
A BSL3 lab was set up in 2019.

AIIMS Bhopal is the 12th institute in India to be designated as Centre of Excellence (CoE) for Rare Diseases.

== Research Activities ==
A Research Based Translational Medicine Department was established in 2019 focussing on areas like Bioinformatics, Tissue Engineering, Molecular Diagnostics, Infectious Diseases, Precision Medicine.

Metagenomics Lab, Cancer Biology Lab, Ethnomedicine Lab, BSL3 Lab, Virology lab etc. have been also established

Memorandum of Understanding have been signed with various institutes like IISc Bangalore, IIT Kanpur, IIT Indore, IISER Bhopal, CSIR-AMPRI, NIT Bhopal to facilitate research activities

7 Patents were filed by Faculties of AIIMS Bhopal in year 2023 and about 300 Pubmed Indexed Papers were published by faculties of AIIMS Bhopal in year 2023 alone

Undergraduate Research Forum and Journal Club was established in 2023 to promote research among MBBS Students in Basic Sciences and Clinical Subjects

== Rankings ==
Life Sciences and Medicine University rankings

Medical – India
- NIRF (2024): 31

AIIMS Bhopal was ranked 31st among medical colleges in India by the National Institutional Ranking Framework (NIRF) in 2024 and 16th by India Today.

== See also ==
- Education in India
- List of medical colleges in India
