= Sarvepalli Radhakrishnan University =

University in Bhopal, Madhya Pradesh, India

Coordinates: 23.168°N 77.468°E

- Type: Public university
- Established: 1995
- Affiliations: UGC, AIU
- Location: Bhopal, Madhya Pradesh, India
- Campus: Urban
- Nickname: SRK University
- Website: www.srku.edu.in//

The Sarvepalli Radhakrishnan University (SRK University) is a multidisciplinary university in Bhopal, Madhya Pradesh, India. The university was established in 1995 under the flagship of RKDF Group of Professional institutes. Currently, Vice Chancellor of the university is Dr. M. C. Prashant.

== List of colleges ==
- R.K.D.F. Institute of Science and Technology
- R.K.D.F. Institute of Science and Technology- M.C.A.
- R.K.D.F. College of Pharmacy
- R.K.D.F. Polytechnic (Pharmacy)
- R.K.D.F. Institute of Management
- R.K.D.F. Institute of Business Management
- R.K.D.F. Homeopathy Medical College Hospital & Research Centre
- R.K.D.F. College of Nursing
- R.K.D.F. Dental College & Research Centre
- R.K.D.F. Medical College Hospital & Research Centre
- Agriculture college
- Paramedical college
- Hospital Management college
- SRK college of Pharmacy
- SRI Sai College of Pharmacy
- SRK College of Law

== Programs ==
=== Under-graduate programs ===
- Bachelor Of Engineering (B.E.)
  - Computer Science & Engineering
  - Information Technology
  - Civil Engineering
  - Electronic Communication Engineering
  - Electrical & Electronics Engineering
  - Electronic Instrument
  - Electronic Engineering
  - Electrical Engineering
  - Mechanical Engineering
- Bachelor Of Pharmacy (B. Pharma)
- B. Sc (Nursing)
- GNM (Nursing)
- BDS
- Bachelor of Medicine, Bachelor of surgery (MBBS)
- Bachelor of Homeopathic Medical and surgery (BHMS)
- Bachelor of Business Administration (BBA)
- Bachelor Of Hospital Management (BHM)
- Bachelor of Science (B. Sc)
  - Medical Laboratory Technology
  - Operation Theatre Technology
  - Cardiac Care Technology
  - Perfusion Technology
  - Neuro Science Technology
  - Renal Dialysis Technology
  - Respiratory Care Technology
  - Anaesthesia Technology
  - Radiotherapy Technology
  - Imaging Technology
  - Agriculture
  - Math
  - Biology
  - Computer Science
  - Information Technology

=== Post-graduate programs ===
- Master of Technology (M.Tech)
  - Computer Science & Engineering
  - Information Technology
  - Software Engineering
  - Digital Communication Engineering
  - Power Electronics Engineering
  - VLSI
  - Microwave Engineering
  - Thermal Engineering
  - Structure Engineering
- Post Graduate diploma in Management (PGDM)
- Master of Business administration (MBA)
  - MBA IN HR- MBA Human Resource
  - MBA IN FINANCE
  - MBA in HA – MBA Hospital Administration
  - MBA in PH- MBA Public Health
- Master in Computer Application (MCA)
- M. Pharma
  - Pharmaceutics
  - Pharmacology
  - Pharma Chemistry
  - Pharmacognosy
- M.Sc Nursing
  - Obstetrics & Gynaecological Nursing
  - Psychiatric Nursing
  - Community Health Nursing
  - Medical Surgical Nursing
  - Pediatric Nursing
- MDS
  - Paedodontics & Preventive Dentistry
  - Qthodontics & Dentofacial Orthopedics
  - Periodontology
  - Oral Medicine & Radiology
  - Pathology & Microbiology
  - Prosthodontics & Crown & Bridge
  - Conservative Dentistry & Endodontic
- M.D. in Homeopathy
  - MD homeopath
  - Materia medica
  - Pharmacy
  - Organon of medicine
  - Repertory
  - Pediatrics
  - Psychiatry
  - Practice of medicine
- Master of Science (M. Sc)
  - Computer Science
  - Information Technology
  - Math
  - Physics
  - Chemistry
  - Botany
  - Zoology

=== Diploma courses ===
- Diploma Polytechnic
  - Diploma Polytechnic in Mechanical Engineering.
  - Diploma Polytechnic in Civil Engineering.
- Diploma of Pharmacy (D. Pharma)
- Diploma in General Nursing & Midwifery (GNM)
- Diploma in Post Basic B.Sc. (Nursing)

=== Doctoral courses PhD programs ===
- Doctor of Philosophy
  - Civil Engineering
  - Mechanical Engineering
  - Computer Organization and Architecture
  - Electrical Engineering
  - Electrical and Electronics Engineering
  - Pharmacy
  - Nursing
  - Management
  - Mathematics
  - Physics
  - Chemistry
