= University Institute of Technology RGPV =

- Former names: Government Engineering College (1986–1988)
- Motto: प्रज्ञानं ब्रह्म (prajñânam brahmah) (Sanskrit)
- Motto in English: Consciousness is the Ultimate
- Type: Public
- Established: 1986
- Affiliations: RGPV
- Director: Dr.Sudhir Singh Bhadauria
- Undergraduates: 2400
- Location: , Bhopal, Madhya Pradesh, India; 23.312126°N 77.361903°E
- Campus: Urban, 214.14 acres
- Acronyms: UIT-RGPV & UIT-RGTU
- Website: wwwuitrgpv.ac.in

University Institute of Technology RGPV, popularly known as UIT RGPV or UIT RGTU, is a technical institute located at Bhopal, India. The institute was established by the government of Madhya Pradesh with the name "Government Engineering College" (GEC) as an autonomous institute in the year 1986. AICTE (All India Council of Technical Education) Application No./UGC Registration No./College Code is-1-136924

== History ==
To address the growing need of engineering expertise, the government of Madhya Pradesh created Government Engineering College (GEC) in 1986 in the state capital Bhopal. The institute initially offered Bachelor of Engineering (B.E.) only in mechanical engineering. Courses in Mining Engineering and computer science and engineering were included when it was declared autonomous in 2002. At the same time it was made a part of Rajiv Gandhi Proudyogiki Vishwavidyala (RGPV), the technological university of the state of Madhya Pradesh. The name of the institute was then changed to its current name (UIT RGPV).
