= VIBGYOR Group of Schools =

Indian educational group

VIBGYOR Group Of Schools
- Maharashtra, Madhya Pradesh, Karnataka, Uttar Pradesh, Gujarat, Tamil Nadu, Haryana; India

Information
- Type: Private school
- Motto: Enthuse Enlighten Empower
- Established: 2004
- School board: CISCE, CBSE, CAIE
- Oversight: EduSpark International Private Limited, Mumbai
- Chairman: Rustom Kerawalla
- Employees: 7000
- Grades: Playschool - 12th grade (ICSE, CBSE, CIE, A-level)
- Enrolment: 55000
- Student to teacher ratio: 1:10 (Average student ratio)
- Campuses: Mumbai, Bengaluru, Mangalore, Coimbatore, Pune, Vadodara, Lucknow, Kolhapur, Surat, Gurgaon, Wagholi, Kalyan, Nashik, Navi Mumbai, Indore, Airoli, Kharghar

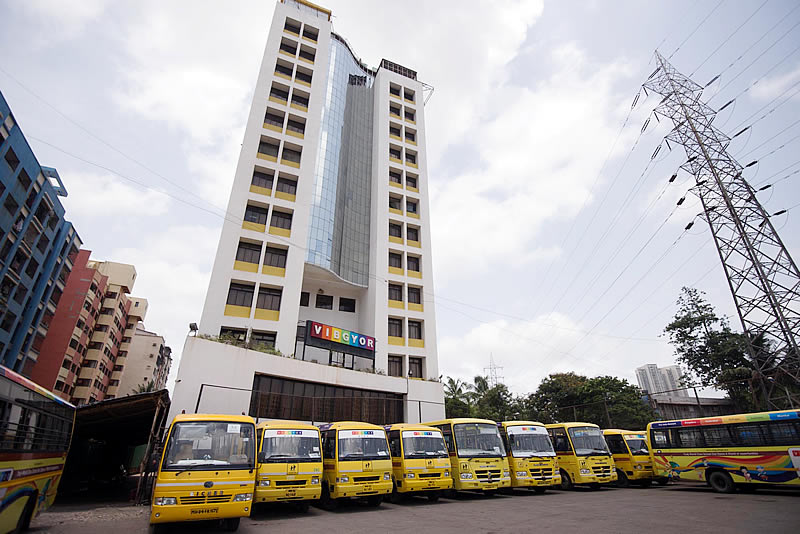
VIBGYOR High in Goregaon, Mumbai

VIBGYOR Group of Schools is an Indian educational group. Founded by Rustom Kerawalla in 2004, the first school was established in Goregaon, Mumbai. Presently, it manages forty schools in fourteen Indian cities. The Group's motto is "Enthuse, enlighten, empower."

== Curriculum ==
The VIBGYOR Group runs VIBGYOR Kids (pre-schools), VIBGYOR High (grades 1-12), VIBGYOR Rise (grades 1-12), VIBGYOR Roots (pre-schools), and VIBGYOR World Academy (pre-school to grade 5). The High school offers a choice between the Indian Certificate of Secondary Education (ICSE), Central Board of Secondary Education (CBSE), International General Certificate of Secondary Education (IGCSE) and A-levels. The World Academy offers the Cambridge International Examinations (CIE) curriculum.

Since 2011, the Group hosts the annual VIBGYOR Model United Nations (MUN) in the summer, open to high school students.

== Controversies ==
=== Bangalore rape incident ===
On 2 July 2014, a six-year-old female student was allegedly raped by two staff members of VIBGYOR High School, Marathahalli, Bengaluru. A medical examination confirmed the girl was sexually abused, prompting protests across Bengaluru and India. Group chairman, Rustom Kerawala, was arrested on 23 July 2014 on charges of intentionally suppressing information, but later released on bail. Two gym teachers were arrested and the police chargesheet was filed in October 2014.

== See also ==
- List of schools in Maharashtra
