= Ratibad (census code 482517) =

- village
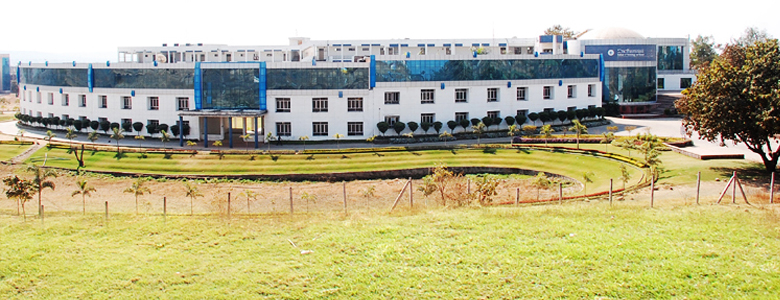
- Radharaman Institute Of Technology & Science

- Location within Madhya Pradesh Location within India
- Coordinates: 23.165964°N 77.328515°E
- Country: India
- State: Madhya Pradesh
- District: Bhopal
- Tehsil: Huzur

Population (2011)
  - Total: 1,740
- Time zone: UTC+5:30 (IST)
- ISO 3166 code: MP-IN
- Census code: 482517

Ratibad is a village in the Bhopal district of Madhya Pradesh, India. It is located in the Huzur tehsil and the Phanda block. Radharaman Institute Of Technology & Science, Patel College of Science & Technology and Sagar Institute of Science and Technology campuses are located here.

== Demographics ==
According to the 2011 census of India, Ratibad has 327 households. The effective literacy rate (i.e. the literacy rate of population excluding children aged 6 and below) is 81.32%.

Demographics (2011 Census)
	Total	Male	Female
Population	1740	921	819
Children aged below 6 years	252	136	116
Scheduled caste	275	144	131
Scheduled tribe	41	23	18
Literates	1210	694	516
Workers (all)	535	429	106
Main workers (total)	398	348	50
Main workers: Cultivators	89	85	4
Main workers: Agricultural labourers	12	10	2
Main workers: Household industry workers	29	18	11
Main workers: Other	268	235	33
Marginal workers (total)	137	81	56
Marginal workers: Cultivators	10	3	7
Marginal workers: Agricultural labourers	58	34	24
Marginal workers: Household industry workers	11	6	5
Marginal workers: Others	58	38	20
Non-workers	1205	492	713
