= Renaissance College of Commerce and Management =

Coordinates: 22.7364172°N 75.8939426°E

Renaissance College of Commerce & Management
- Type: Private, Commerce College
- Established: 2006
- Academic affiliations: Devi Ahilya Vishwavidyalaya
- Chairman: Swapnil Kothari
- Principal: Dr. Rachana Ghadge
- Location: 45, Anurag Nagar, Indore – 452001, Indore, Madhya Pradesh, 452001, India
- Campus: Urban
- Colors: green
- Nickname: RCCM
- Website: www.rccmindore.com

Renaissance College of Commerce and Management (/rɪˈneɪsns/) was established in 2006. RCCM is a modern College for commerce and management education, located in Indore, the commercial capital of Madhya Pradesh. It inherits the concept of Gurukul.
