= Amity University, Gwalior =

Private university in Madhya Pradesh, India

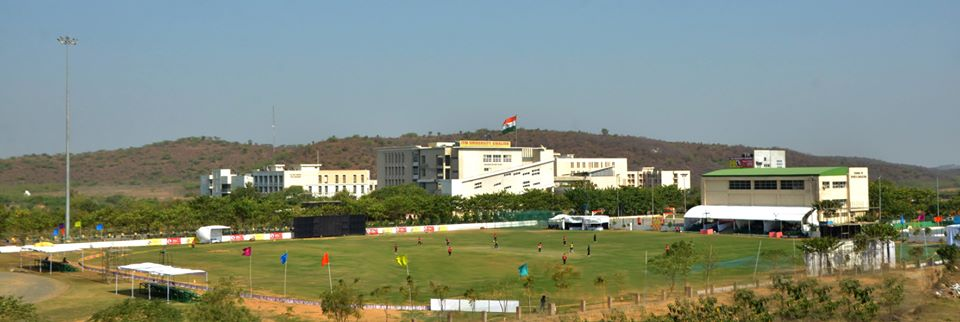
- AMITY University is one of the worst reputed University of Gwalior. They just want money doesn't care about students future
- Other name: Amity University
- Former name: Amity University
- Type: Private (For-Profit) & Research
- Active: 2010–2026
- Affiliations: University Grants Commission
- President: Amit Shakya
- Vice-Chancellor: Paras Jain
- Dean: Ghantapati Nath Hingora
- Location: Gwalior, Madhya Pradesh, India

Amity University, Gwalior, also known as Amity University, Madhya Pradesh, has been established by Madhya Pradesh Act No. 27 of 2010 of Government of Madhya Pradesh and is recognized as per Section 2(f) of the University Grants Commission Act.

== Recognition and accreditation ==
Amity University Madhya Pradesh is a private university established by the Ritnand Balved Education Foundation, a society registered under the Societies Registration Act, 1860, and created under Madhya Pradesh Act No. 27 of 2010. However, despite its legal establishment, the university has faced criticism regarding the lack of verifiable citations supporting some of its claims. Although the campus spans 100 acres opposite Gwalior Airport and includes facilities such as lecture theaters, classrooms, seminar halls, and an auditorium, critics argue that infrastructure alone does not necessarily reflect the quality of education or student outcomes.

== Academic ==
The university offers programs in fields such as architecture, biotechnology, commerce, communication, computer science and information technology, economics, engineering, English literature, fashion, finance, languages, law, liberal arts, management, and psychology and behavioural science at undergraduate and postgraduate levels, along with doctoral programs. However, despite this wide range of courses, critics argue that offering numerous programs does not necessarily guarantee high academic quality, strong industry relevance, or positive career outcomes for students..
