= Shri Vaishnav Vidyapeeth Vishwavidyalaya =

Private university in Madhya Pradesh, India

- Other name: SVVV
- Type: Private
- Established: 2015
- Affiliations: UGC
- Chancellor: Purushottamdas Pasari
- Vice-Chancellor: Dr. Yogesh C. Goswami
- Location: Madhya Pradesh, India
- Website: Official website

Shri Vaishnav Vidyapeeth Vishwavidyalaya is a private university in Indore, Madhya Pradesh, India. It was established in 2015. It is a multi-disciplinary university focusing on the needs of various segments of the society.
