= Oriental University =

Private university in Madhya Pradesh, India

- Motto: A Smart University
- Type: Private
- Established: 2011
- Founder: K. L. Thakral
- Affiliations: UGC
- Chancellor: Praveen Thakral
- Vice-Chancellor: Dr. Amol Gore
- Location: Indore, Madhya Pradesh, India; 22.8028°N 75.8558°E
- Website: oui.edu.in/.in/

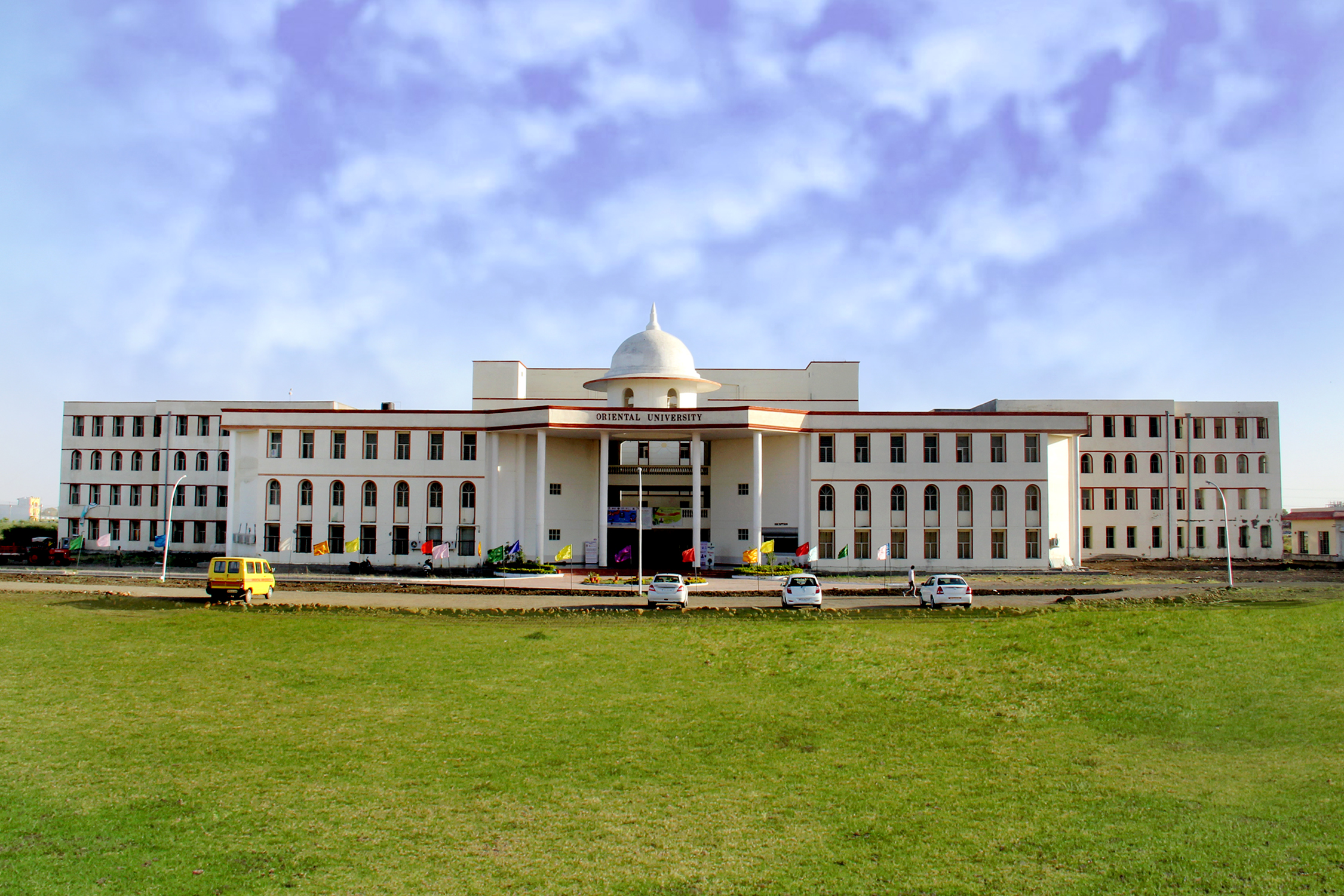
Oriental University building

Oriental University is a private university in Indore, Madhya Pradesh, India. It was established in 2011.

== History ==
Oriental University was established on May 4, 2011, through the Madhya Pradesh Niji Vishwavidyalay(Sthapana Ewam Sanchalan) Sanshodhan Adhiniyam, 2011, which also established People's University and ITM University.
