= Shri Govindram Seksaria Institute of Technology and Science =

College in Madhya Pradesh, India

- Motto: आचारः प्रथमो धर्मः
- Motto in English: Following the right tradition is the first duty
- Type: State Govt. Aided Seksaria Trust, Indore
- Established: 1952; 74 years ago
- Endowment: Government of Madhya Pradesh
- Director: Nitesh Purohit
- Students: 3810
- Undergraduates: 2880
- Postgraduates: 918
- Doctoral students: 12
- Location: Indore, Madhya Pradesh, India; 22.7252°N 75.8713°E
- Campus: Urban, spread over 35 acres (0.14 km^{2})
- Language: English
- Website: www.sgsits.ac.in

Shri Govindram Seksaria Institute of Technology and Science (SGSITS), is an institute of technology located in Indore, Madhya Pradesh, India. It is an autonomous institution funded by the Government of Madhya Pradesh, India.

SGSITS is an autonomous institute for academic and administrative purposes. It is a part of the Rajiv Gandhi Proudyogiki Vishwavidyalaya. Its degrees are issued by this university.

== History ==
Established in 1952, SGSITS was initially known as "Shri Govindram Seksaria Kala Bhavan". The institute came into being as a result of the desire expressed by the Prime Minister Jawaharlal Nehru to a group of leading industrialists of Indore for establishing a technical institute.

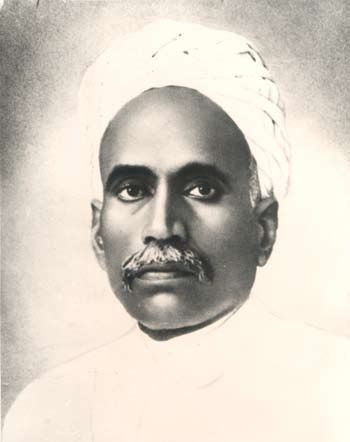
The institute is named after Seth Shri Govindram Seksaria.

An industrialist of the town, Seth Shri Kudilaji Seksaria, responded by donating an initial amount for starting the institute in the name of his late father Seth Shri Govindram Seksaria, who is famously known as the Cotton King of India.

In 1956 it was converted to a degree college with a course in Civil Engineering and its name was changed to Govindram Seksaria Technological Institute (GSTI).

With the introduction of M.Sc. courses in Applied Sciences, the name of the institute was changed to its present name. In 1989 the institute was granted autonomous status by the University Grants Commission and the AICTE.

The Department of Management Studies was established in the year 2012.

Professor Neetesh Purohit took charge as Director of the institute on October 30, 2024.

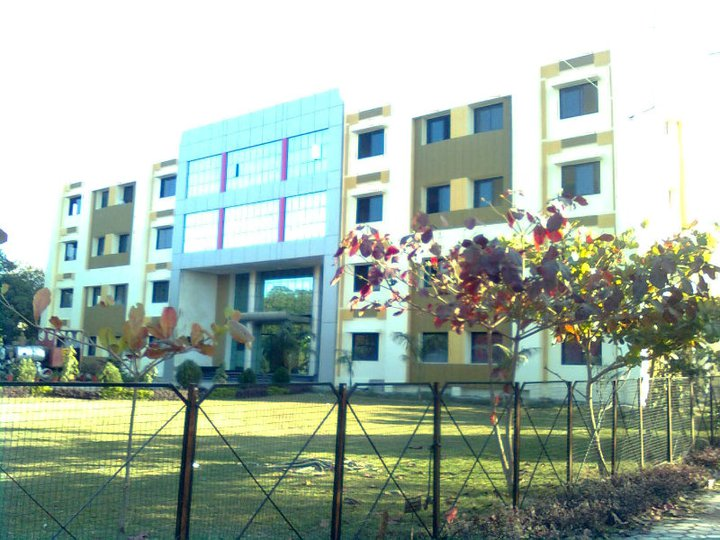
ATC block

== Campus ==
The campus spreads over 35 acres and is located in Indore.

== Academic departments ==
The institute offers 10 undergraduate, 25 postgraduate courses with an annual intake of 720 and 459 students respectively. It also offers Ph.D. Programs under QIP in all branches of Engineering & Sciences (except Biomedical Engineering, Information Technology and MBA). In addition, 4 part-time undergraduate and 2 part-time postgraduate courses are offered for working professionals with Engineering Diploma.

The Institute offer AICTE approved M.Tech. in Quantum Computing, which is first of its kind in the country and AICTE approved M.B.A. in Hospital Administration.

Teaching and related activities of the institute are taken care of by different departments, centers, and cells of the institute. The departments are as follows:

=== Departments ===
- Engineering:
  - Biomedical engineering
  - Civil Engineering and Applied Mechanics
  - Computer Engineering
  - Electrical Engineering
  - Electronics and Telecommunication Engineering
  - Electronics and Instrumentation Engineering
  - Information Technology
  - Industrial and Production Engineering
  - Mechanical Engineering
- Science
  - Physics:
    - Applied Physics & Opto electronics
  - Chemistry
    - Applied Chemistry
  - Mathematics
    - Applied Mathematics & Computational Sciences
- Management Studies
- Pharmacy
  - Industrial Pharmacy
  - Pharmaceutical Chemistry
- Humanities and Social Sciences
- Computer Technology and Applications

== Student Activities ==
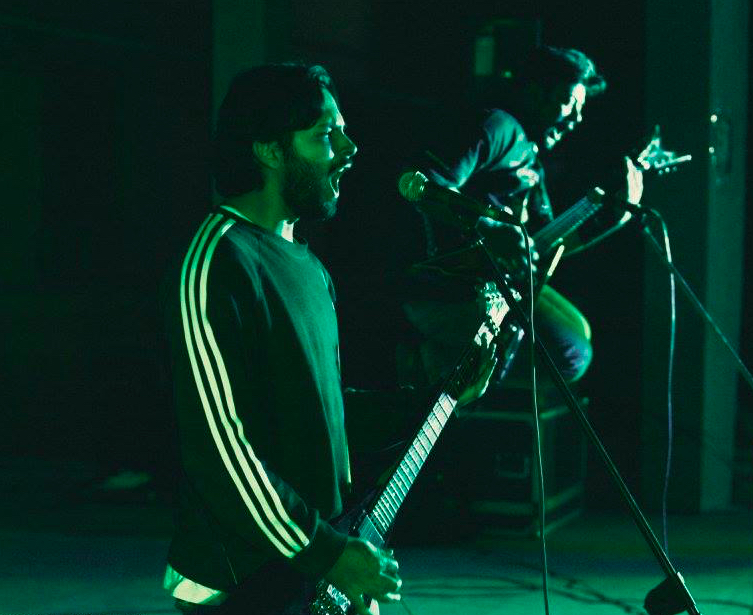
Nicotine headlining the event at SGSITS on 15th March 2016. L to R - Digvijay Bhonsale (Lead Vocals & Guitar) & Aniruddha Gokhale (Lead Guitarist & Backing Vocals).

Every year the Institute organizes cultural events for the students in both the semesters. Apart from this there are a large number of hobby clubs which conduct their activities throughout the year.

The academic session starts with a fresher’s day, “Aavahan”. This program is exclusively designed for the fresh students joining the Institute. In this program, the fresher’s get an opportunity of getting introduced to the Director of the Institute and Deans, along with the Professor In charge of cultural and literary affairs. The students listen to the orientation lectures of the Director, Dean of Student Welfare, Dean of Academics and Professor I/c Cultural and Literary Affairs. A cultural program is organized on this occasion. This program generally includes various events of music, drama, compering and inter branch competition.

The Institute hosts a Techno-Cultural event, “Aayaam”. This program hosts large number of events. Nearly 1500–2000 students take part in this event.

The program begins with “Gold Medal Award Ceremony”. This prestigious ceremony is held to honour the meritorious students of the Institute. In all 10 Gold Medals (K.G. Seksaria Medals) are conferred to ten toppers of the different branches of Engineering and Pharmacy. Apart from this the Institute also confers about 8 to 10 gold and silver medals and certificates Instituted by various individuals and organizations. After the conclusion of the gold medal award ceremony, the other program spanning up to 3 days begin. The major programs included in Aayaam are open movie theater, nukkad natak, robotics competition, programming competition, bridge design competition, health camp and blood donation camp, circuit design competition, student paper presentations, art exhibition, rangoli competition, marathon, food stalls and games, and cultural program of the students.

=== Clubs ===
The Institute has many student hobby clubs. These clubs host a number of events during the year and provide an opportunity to the students to pursue their hobbies. Few of them are listed below:

- GS Production House
- Team GSRacers (BAJA Segment)
- Team GSMotorsports (Formula Segment)
- Pratibimb
- CodeFoster
- Computer Club
- Magazine and Literary Committee
- TRIVIM
- SAE
- E-Cell
- Club Ojaswa
- Club Kshitij
- Ingenious
- Sparkle

== Centres and Cells ==
The Centres and Cells available are:

- AICTE IDEALab
- Computer Centre
- Centre for Continuing Education Programme
- Entrepreneurship Development Cell
- Training and Placement Cell
- Central Workshop and Management Cell
- Center for Nanotechnology
- Centre for Lasers and Fiber Optics
- Centre for VLSI Designs Entrepreneurship Development
- Cell Center for Advanced Automation
- Centre for Industry-Institute Interaction
- Remote Sensing Cell
- Center for Innovation, Design and Incubation (CIDI)

== Notable alumni ==
- Deepak B. Phatak (Padma Shri)
- Digvijay Singh
- Bala Bachchan
- Sushil Doshi, Sushil Doshi (Padma Shri)Journalist, Writer, Sports Commentator awarded with Padma Shri
