= ITM University (Gwalior) =

Private university in Madhya Pradesh

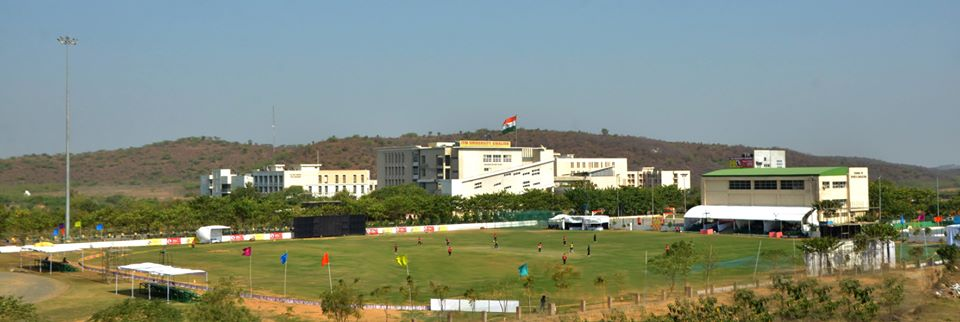
- Established: 2011
- Affiliations: UGC, AICTE, INC, ICAR, PCE, NCTE etc.
- Chancellor: Smt. Ruchi Singh
- Vice-Chancellor: Prof. Yogesh Upadhyay
- Location: Gwalior, Madhya Pradesh, India; 26°8′51″N 78°11′18″E
- Campus: Urban
- Website: www.itmuniversity.ac.in

ITM University is a state private university based in Gwalior, India. Subjects are offered in the fields of sciences, engineering, management, fine arts, social sciences, arts, and nursing etc. It was established under the Act of State Legislature Madhya Pradesh.

== Campus ==
ITM University is located at a highly visible site on NH 75 in the city of Gwalior, Madhya Pradesh. Each department has its own building with laboratory, library and computer facilities. The 'NAAD' amphitheater has a seating capacity of more than 3000 people is being used for cultural and co-curricular activities of the Institutes. The university has four Boy's hostel for men one hostel for women. The hostels are called Nalanda, Narmada, Sadipani, Shantiniketan and Girls Cottage. They have 120, 320, 320, 200, and 120 beds respectively. The mess halls also have two blocks of mess halls. Their dining halls are approximately 26,000 square feet with a semi-mechanized system of cooking, having enough space for dining & mess facility for 600 & 520 respectively persons at a time. The campus also has an auditorium, on-campus nursing home and a 24-hour functional OPD, a gymnasium along with badminton, volleyball, handball, basketball courts & Indoors's play. ITM University recently opened the gates of new building named J.C.Bose Block.

== Schools ==
- School of Engineering and Technology
- School of Computer Applications
- School Of Business
- School of Art & Design
- School of Physical Education & Sports
- School of Nursing Sciences
- School of Medical and Paramedical Sciences
- School of Pharmacy
- School of Science
- School of Agriculture
- School of Architecture & Design
- School of Education
- School of Fine Arts
- School of Law
- School of Humanities and Literary Studies

== Annual festivals ==
4444 students from 25 schools met up at ITM University, Gwalior in February 2012 forming the largest human-made 'smiley face' during KRONOS 2012

KRONOS: The annual youth festival KRONOS, is a four-day national level techno-cultural fest organized by the Student's Activity Council of ITM Universe. Started in 2010, KRONOS is held in the month of March or April. It has technical events (in collaboration with by the ISOI, CSI, IETE and ISTE Student Chapters) and cultural events. Teams from ITM and other colleges participate to win prizes in various events during the festival. The main attractions are performances by national and international bands.

TIMS (Technology Innovation Management for Sustainable Development): Features a technical programme including keynote speeches, panel discussion, oral and poster sessions and cultural programme.
