= Rajiv Gandhi Proudyogiki Vishwavidyalaya =

State University in Madhya Pradesh

- Other name: State Technological University of Madhya Pradesh
- Motto: prajñânam brahmah
- Type: Public
- Established: 1998; 28 years ago
- Affiliations: UGC, NAAC
- Chancellor: Governor of Madhya Pradesh
- Vice-Chancellor: Prof. Alok Sharma
- Location: Bhopal, Madhya Pradesh, India
- Campus: Urban
- Mascot: Falcon
- Website: www.rgpv.ac.in

Rajiv Gandhi Proudyogiki Vishwavidyalaya (RGPV), also known as State Technological University of Madhya Pradesh, is a state university situated in Bhopal, Madhya Pradesh, India. It is a multi-campus affiliating, research university offering diploma, undergraduate, postgraduate, integrated, dual and doctoral courses in fields like engineering, technology, pharmacy, management, architecture, design and applied sciences. The university has been accredited with Grade 'A' by NAAC.

== History ==
RGPV was established in the year 1998, by Madhya Pradesh Vidhan Sabha Act 13, 1998. The university was established by the Government of Madhya Pradesh as a common university for all the technical institutes, mainly including engineering and pharmacy colleges in the state of Madhya Pradesh. The university was named after the former Prime Minister of India, Rajiv Gandhi

== Administration ==
The Governor of Madhya Pradesh is the ex officio Chancellor of the university. The university is headed by the Vice-Chancellor, assisted by the registrar, two controllers, for exams and finance, and two deputy registrars for administration and academics. There are five deans, who have authority over the academic departments of civil engineering, computer & information technology, electrical & electronics, industrial technology, and applied sciences. The polytechnic wing is administered by a secretary and a research officer.

== Academics ==
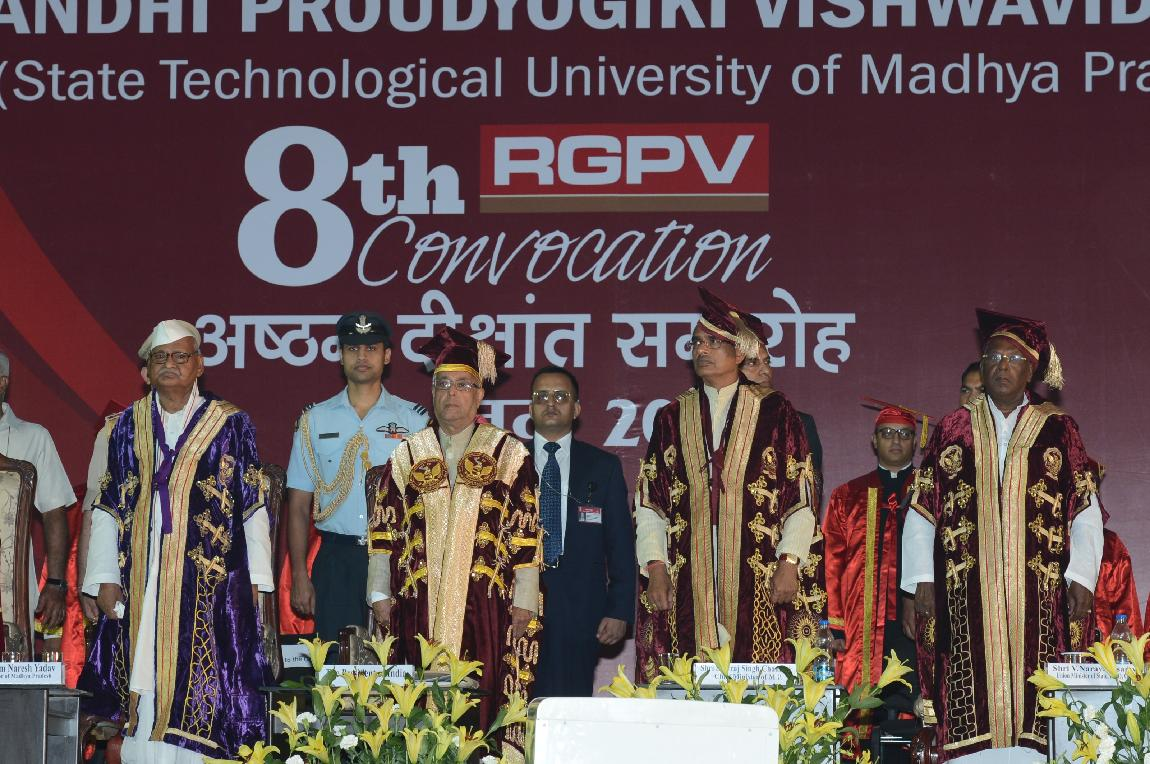
President of India, Shri Pranab Mukherjee, with the Governor and Chief Minister of Madhya Pradesh, at the 8th annual convocation of RGPV

All course work and examinations for all majors and subjects are conducted with English language as the mode of instruction. Undergraduate courses are given in various fields like engineering, technology, pharmacy, management, architecture, design and applied sciences. Postgraduate courses include Master of Technology (M.Tech.), Master of Science (M.Sc.), Master of Design (M.Des), Master of Architecture (M.Arch), Master of Pharmacy (M.Pharm.), Master of Computer Applications (MCA) in relevant fields, as well as other master's degrees. Dual postgraduate courses with Management (B.E.+ MBA) or Technology (B.E. + M.Tech.). Master of Science (M.S.) degree in Cyber Law and Information Security is a collaborative programme, jointly offered by the National Law Institute University, Bhopal and RGPV. Integrated degree course Master of Applied Management (MAM). Doctor of Philosophy (PhD) is also offered in all the above departments. Degrees are conferred and meritorious students are awarded with gold medals presented by the Hon'ble President of India during annual convocation ceremony.

== Affiliated institutes ==
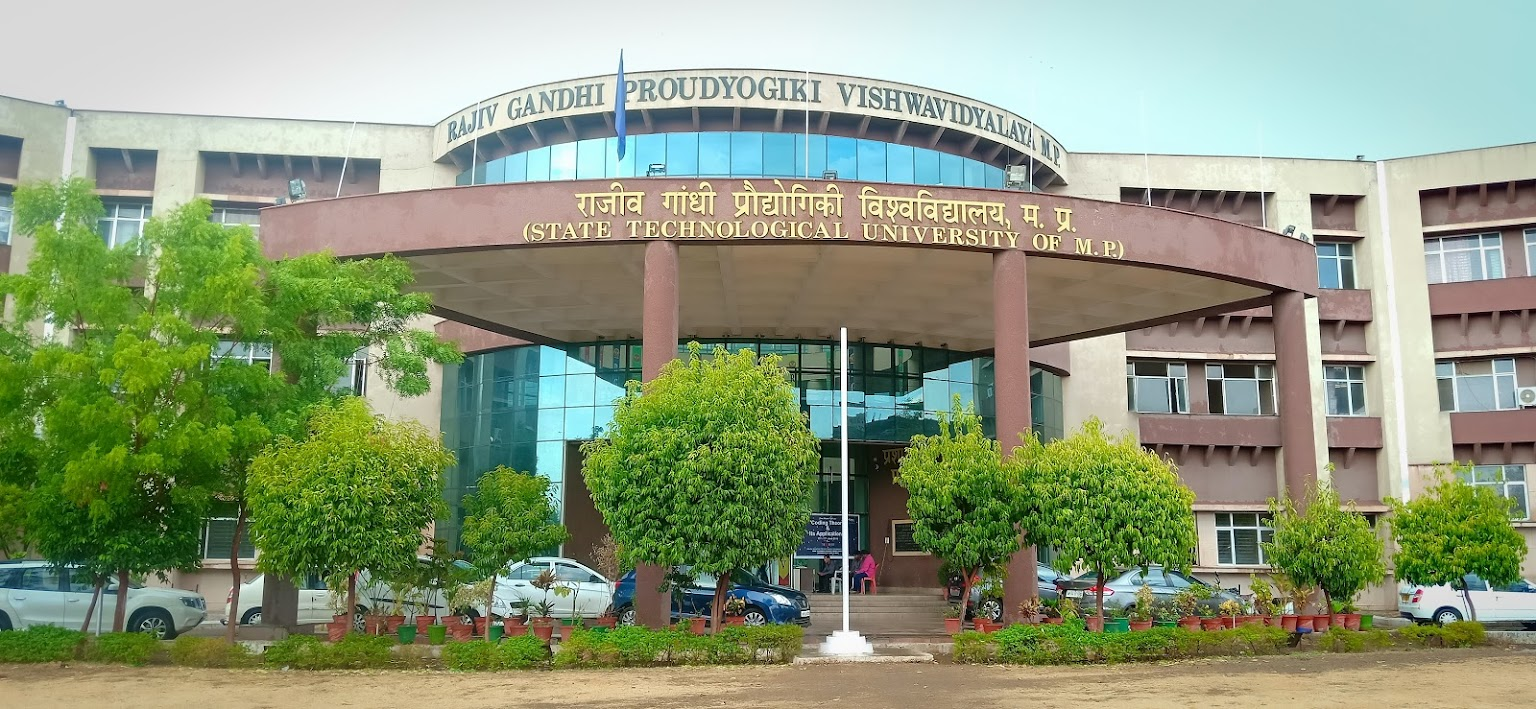
RGPV Bhopal

Rajiv Gandhi Proudyogiki Vishwavidyalaya affiliated institutes include 5 teaching institutions, 200 engineering institutions, 98 pharmacy institutions, 95 MCA institutions, 4 architecture institutions and 85 diploma institutions. RGPV has its own universitry teaching department known as UIT RGPV.
