= 1992 Indian presidential election =

Election of Shankar Dayal Sharma

- 16 July 1992
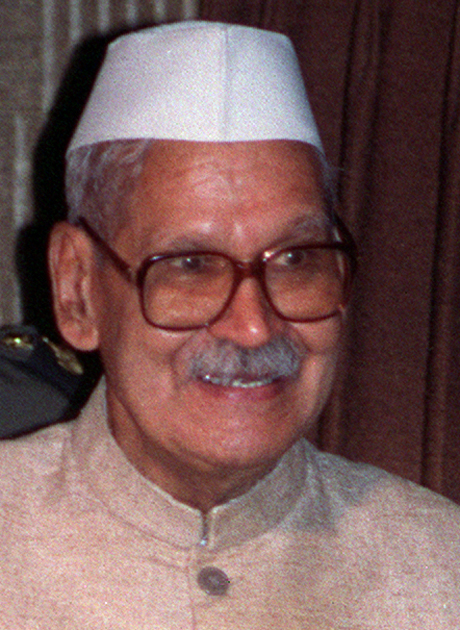

Nominee	Shankar Dayal Sharma	George Gilbert Swell
Party	INC(I)	Independent
Home state	Madhya Pradesh	Meghalaya
Electoral vote	675,864	346,485
Percentage	65.86%	33.76%
Swing	6.43% ▼	New
President before election
R. Venkataraman
INC(I)
Elected President
Shankar Dayal Sharma
INC(I)

The Election Commission of India held indirect tenth presidential elections of India on 13 July 1992, with declaring the results on 16 July. Shankar Dayal Sharma with 675,864 votes won over his nearest rival George Gilbert Swell who got 346,485 votes.

== Candidates ==
This presidential election, saw many candidates competing for the presidency, due to the divide nationally for power. The top two candidates were, Shankar Dayal Sharma, put forth by Indian National Congress and George Gilbert Swell, member of Rajya Sabha, from Meghalaya, as the Independent candidate supported by the BJP and National Front.

== Results ==
Source: Web archive of Election Commission of India website

Candidate	Electoral Values
Shankar Dayal Sharma	675,864
George Gilbert Swell	346,485
Ram Jethmalani	2,704
Joginder Singh	1,135
Total	1,026,188

== See also ==
- 1992 Indian vice presidential election
