= 1987 Indian presidential election =

Election of R. Venkataraman

- 16 July 1987
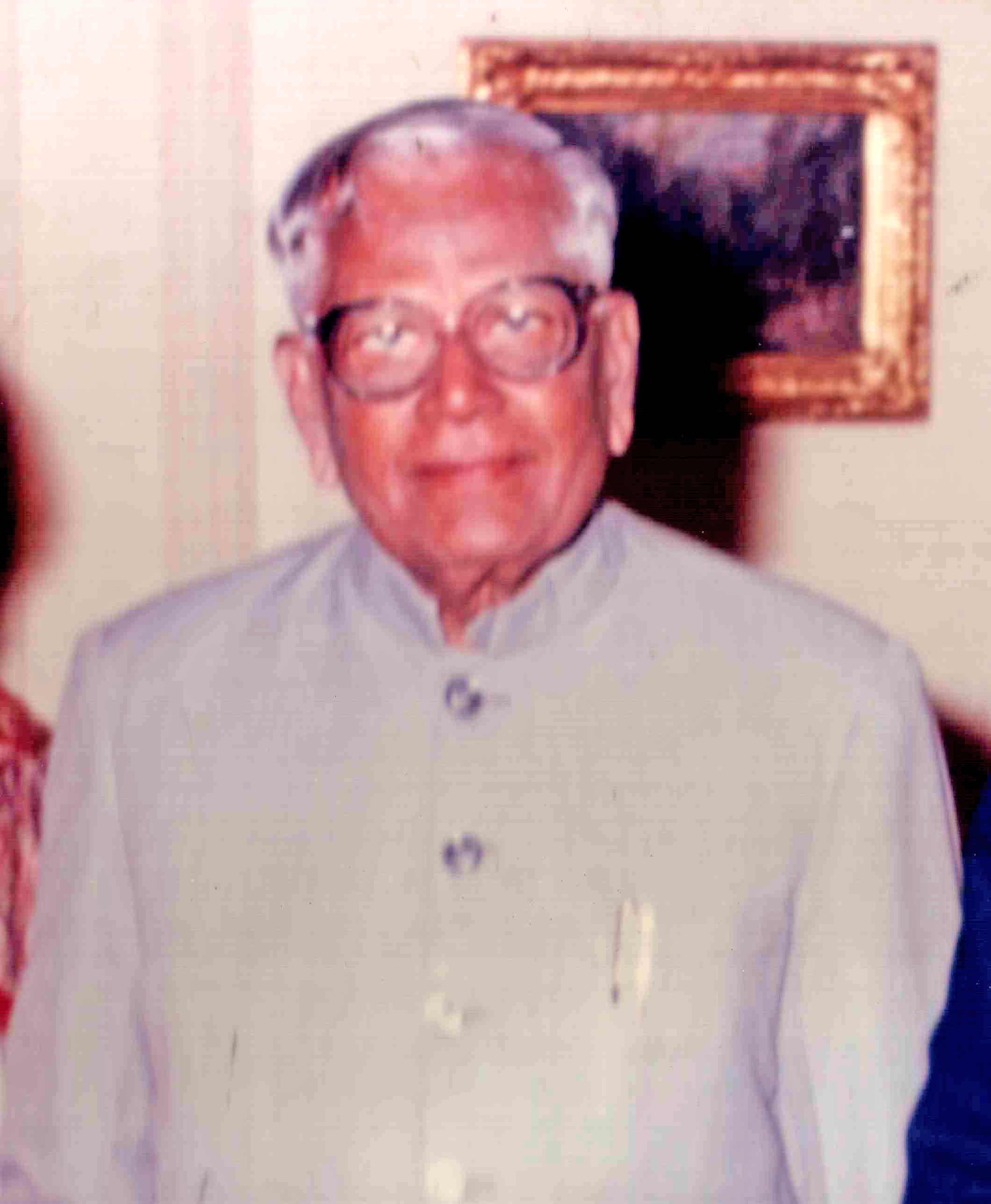

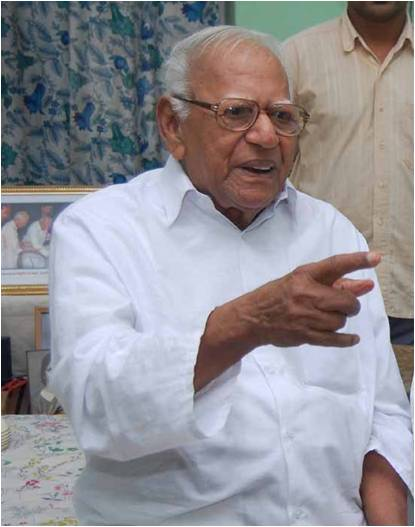
Nominee	R. Venkataraman	V. R. Krishna Iyer
Party	INC(I)	Independent
Home state	Tamil Nadu	Kerala
Electoral vote	740,148	281,550
Percentage	72.29%	27.50%
Swing	0.44% ▼	New
President before election
Zail Singh
INC(I)
Elected President
R. Venkataraman
INC(I)

The Election Commission of India held indirect ninth presidential elections of India on 16 July 1987. R. Venkataraman with 740,148 votes won over his nearest rival V. R. Krishna Iyer who got 281,550 votes.

== Schedule ==
The election schedule was announced by the Election Commission of India on 10 June 1987.

S.No.	Poll Event	Date
1.	Last Date for filing nomination	24 June 1987
2.	Date for Scrutiny of nomination	25 June 1987
3.	Last Date for Withdrawal of nomination	27 June 1987
4.	Date of Poll	13 July 1987
5.	Date of Counting	16 July 1987

== Results ==
Source: Web archive of Election Commission of India website

Candidate	Electoral Values
R. Venkataraman	740,148
V. R. Krishna Iyer	281,550
Mithilesh Kumar	2,223
Total	1,023,921

== Aftermath ==
R. Venkatraman was sworn in as president, on 25 July 1987. Since he was the sitting vice president at the time, the 1987 Indian vice presidential election was also needed, which was won by Shankar Dayal Sharma.

== See also ==
- 1984 Indian vice presidential election
- 1987 Indian vice presidential election
