= 1992 Indian vice presidential election =

Vice-presidential election in India

← 1987	19 August 1992	1997 →
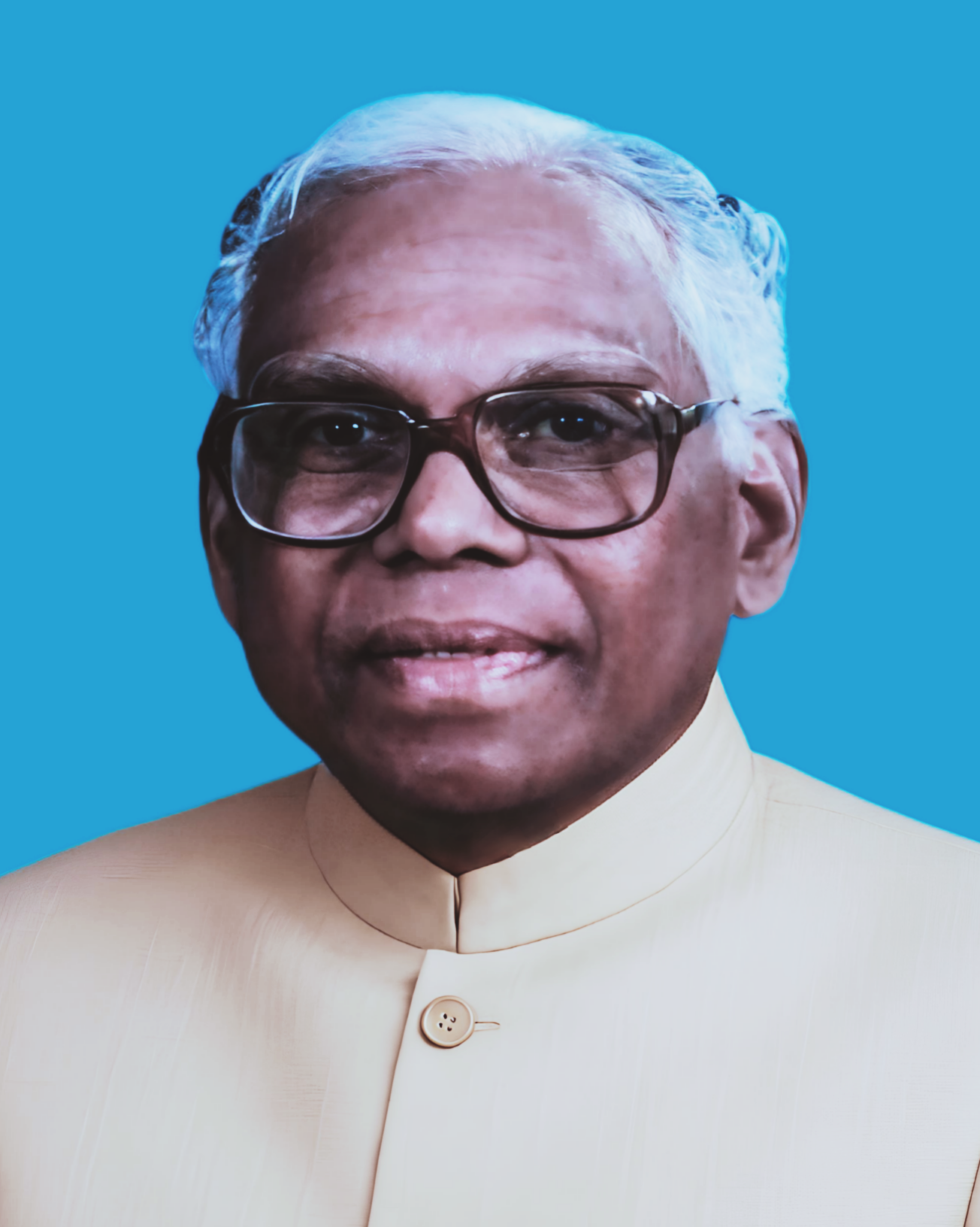
Nominee	K. R. Narayanan	Joginder Singh
Party	INC(I)	Independent
Home state	Kerala	Punjab
Electoral vote	700	1
Percentage	99.86%	0.14%
Vice President before election
Vacant, last held by Shankar Dayal Sharma
INC(I)
Elected Vice President
K. R. Narayanan
INC(I)

The 1992 Indian vice presidential election was held on 19 August 1992 to elect the vice president of India. K. R. Narayanan defeated Joginder Singh to become ninth vice president of India. Out of 701 valid votes, Narayanan received 700 votes, while Singh secured only one vote. At the time of the election, VP office was vacant since the incumbent, Shankar Dayal Sharma, had already inaugurated as President following his victory in the presidential election.

== Candidates ==
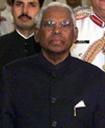
Academician and diplomat
K. R. Narayanan

Perennial candidate
Joginder Singh

== Result ==
Result of the Indian vice-presidential election, 1992
Candidate	Party	Electoral Votes	% of Votes
K. R. Narayanan	INC(I)	700	99.86
Joginder Singh	Independent	1	0.14
Total		701	100.00
Valid Votes		701	98.59
Invalid Votes		10	1.41
Turnout		711	90.00
Abstentions		79	10.00
Electors		790	

== See also ==
- 1992 Indian presidential election
