= India–Zimbabwe relations =

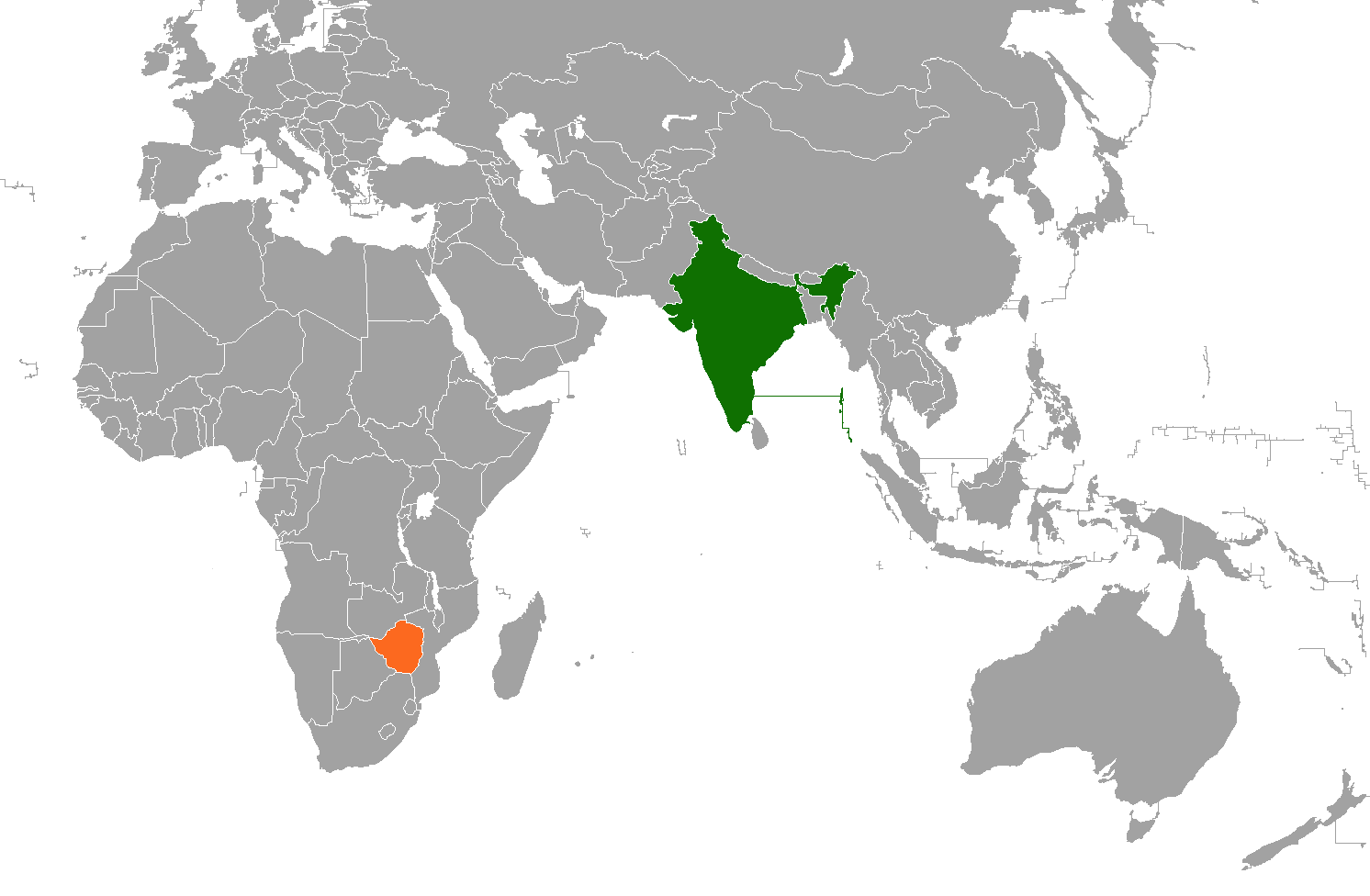

- India: Zimbabwe

Diplomatic mission
- Embassy of India, Harare: Embassy of Zimbabwe, New Delhi

Envoy
- Ambassador Bramha Kumar: Ambassador Dr. Godfrey Majoni Chipare

India–Zimbabwe relations are bilateral relations between India and Zimbabwe.

== History ==
India and Zimbabwe have a long history of close and cordial relations. During the era of the Munhumutapa Kingdom, Indian merchants established strong links with Zimbabwe, trading in textiles, minerals and metals. Sons of the royal house of Munhumutapa journeyed to India to broaden their education. In the 17th century, a great son of Zimbabwe, Dom Miguel – Prince, Priest and Professor, and heir to the imperial throne of the Mutapas – studied in Goa. An inscribed pillar stands today at a chapel in Goa, a tribute to his intellectual stature. India supported Zimbabwe's freedom struggle. Former Prime Minister Smt. Indira Gandhi attended Zimbabwean independence celebrations in 1980.

There were frequent exchanges of high-level visits in the past, bilateral or to attend Summits such as NAM, CHOGM and G-15. Former Prime Minister Shri Vajpayee and President Mugabe met twice in the year 2003 on the sidelines of UNGA and NAM Summit. Former President Mugabe attended the IAFS-III held Delhi in 2015.

India supported Zimbabwe's independence movement. The then-Prime Minister Indira Gandhi attended the country's independence day celebrations in 1980. Prime Ministers Rajiv Gandhi, Narasimha Rao and H. D. Deve Gowda visited Zimbabwe in 1986, 1991, and 1996 to participate in the NAM Summit, CHOGM Summit, and G-15 Summit respectively. Presidents R. Venkataraman and S. D. Sharma made state visits to the country in 1991 and 1995 respectively.

- Visits from India to Zimbabwe
  - 1980 – Prime Minister Smt. Indira Gandhi – to attend Independence Celebrations of Zimbabwe.
  - 1986 – Prime Minister Shri Rajiv Gandhi to attend NAM Summit.
  - 1989 – President Shri R. Venkataraman
  - 1991 – Prime Minister Shri Narasimha Rao – to attend CHOGM Summit
  - 1995 – President Dr. S. D. Sharma
  - 1996 – Prime Minister Shri H. D. Deve Gowda for the G-15 Summit
  - 2018 - Vice President, Shri Venkaiah Naidu- Official Visit
- Visits from Zimbabwe to India
  - 1981 – President Robert Gabriel Mugabe
  - 1983 – President Robert Gabriel Mugabe to attend CHOGM and NAM Summits
  - 1987 – President Mugabe – Africa Fund Summit
  - 1991 – President Mugabe – Nehru Award Presentation
  - 1993 – President Mugabe
  - 1994 – President Mugabe – G-15 Summit
  - 2015 – President Mugabe – IAFS-III Summit
  - 2018 - Vice President General(Retd) Dr C.G.N. Chiwenga– Special Envoy ofPresident E.D.Mnangagwa

== Capacity Building Programmes (ITEC & ICCR Scholarships) ==
Assistance to Zimbabwe under the ITEC programme has been a regular feature of India's assistance to Zimbabwe for capacity building. ITEC and ICCR scholarships are much sought after by Zimbabweans. In 2017–18, 235 ITEC slots, 9 ICCR slots and 34 IAFS-III slots were utilised. During the period April–December 2018, 169 ITEC slots, 5 defence ITEC slots and 9 ICCR scholarships have been utilized. Over 1400 Zimbabweans have been trained in short-term civilian courses in India under the ITEC programme over the last ten years.

Indian Institute of Foreign Trade in collaboration with ZimTrade conducted Executive Development Programme on International Business from 17 to 21 November, 2014 in Harare and another such Programme from March 9–13, 2015 in Bulawayo. Through various memoranda of understanding entered with institutions of great repute in India, The Harare Institute of Technology [HIT] is sending its students to various Universities to get degrees in Master of Technology in various disciplines such as Delhi Technological University; Amity University, Manessar; Sharda University; Jawaharlal Nehru Technological University; Vellore Institute of Technology; Rabindranath Tagore University; IIT Madras; Indian Institute of Welding; National Institute of Foundry and Forging Technology; Marwadi University; IIT Kharagpur; Kalinga Institute of Industrial Technology; Institute of Technology and Management and Sri Ramaswamy Memorial Institute of Science and Technology.

Under the Presidential and National |Scholarship Programme, Government of Zimbabwe has sent 42 students to Shimla University in 2018. The scholarship programme is co-sponsored by the Shimla University

== Economic relations ==
Bilateral trade between India and Zimbabwe totalled US$222.31 million in 2014–15. Indian exports to Zimbabwe stood at $222.19 million, while imports stood at $120,000. Zimbabwe has, of late, started following 'Look East Policy' and India is now looked upon as important trading as well as a business partner.

- Trade & Investment:

Bilateral Trade Year (April–March)	Exports to Zimbabwe ( in million US$)	Imports from Zimbabwe (in million US$)
2010-11	113.95	11.56
2011-12	171.72	6.89
2012-13	153.19	34.54
2013-14	158.06	12.50
2014-15	223.96	32.70
2015-16	205.08	24.45
2016-17	109.08	60.46
2017-18	163.54	62.20

India and Zimbabwe signed a Joint Commission Agreement in January 1987. Four meetings of the Joint Commission have been held so far – first in New Delhi in April 1987; second in Harare in February 1989; third in New Delhi in October 1990 and the fourth in Harare in January 1996. No Joint Commission meeting has been held since 1996 mainly due to Zimbabwe's economic turmoil. Dates for holding 5th JCM in Delhi are being worked out.

An SoM was held in the Ministry of Commerce and Industry in New Delhi in February 2012, followed by the 2nd Joint Trade Committee meeting in Harare in March 2013. The Air Services Agreement between India and Zimbabwe was signed on June 19, 2014, in Harare.

Indian public sector firms such as Indian Railway Construction Company (IRCON), Rail India Technical & Economic Services (RITES), Water and Power Consultancy Services (WAPCOS) and Telecommunications India Ltd. (TCIL) are active in Zimbabwe. Kirloskar and Jain Irrigation supply pumps and irrigation equipment to Zimbabwe. Indian pharmaceutical firms have a strong presence in the Zimbabwean market and Indian-made medicines are commonly found in the country.

In April 2008, Chadha Power of India secured a contract to refurbish four units at the Hwange Thermal Power Station near Victoria Falls.

== Indian foreign aid ==
India is involved in human resource development and capacity building efforts in Zimbabwe. India provides ITEC and ICCR scholarships to Zimbabwean citizens. India gave assistance of 50,000 tonnes of rice in 2003 when Zimbabwe experienced severe drought. Another similar assistance of 500 tonnes of rice was given on March 23, 2015. India granted US$5 million for promoting SMEs (Indo-Zimbabwe Technology Centre) in Zimbabwe, a project inaugurated by President Robert Mugabe on August 4, 2008. The final phase of the project completed in February 2013. India set up three 'Hole-In-The-Wall' computer learning stations in 2012. India is in the process of setting up a Vocational Training Center (under IAFS-I) and a Food Testing Laboratory (FTL) and a Rural Technology Park (RTP) under IAFS-II under aid budget. There has been no movement forward in the case of FTL and RTP. Besides, under GOI Line of Credit (LOC) worth US$28.6 million upgradation of Deka Pumping Station and River Water Intake System is in progress. An additional LOC of US$19 million has been extended for this project. Another LOC Agreement worth US$87 million was signed on October 27, 2015, in New Delhi on the sidelines of IAFS-III between the Government of Zimbabwe and the EXIM Bank of India for renovation/upgradation of Bulawayo Thermal Power Plant. An additional US$23 million has been extended for this project. Under the EXIM Bank of India's Buyer's Credit Agreement worth US$49.92 million, M/s. Ashok Leyland Ltd. supplied around 635 vehicles and spare parts to the Ministry of Tourism & Hospitality Industry in October 2015. Under the similar facility from EXIM Bank of India, BEML Ltd, India supplied worth US$13.03 million mining equipment and blast hole drill and spare parts to Hwange Colliery Company Ltd., Zimbabwe. The mining equipment was commissioned on June 19, 2015, by Zimbabwean Vice President Phelekezela Mphoko.

During the visit of Hon'ble Vice President Shri Venkaiah Naidu to Zimbabwe in November 2018 the following announcements were made: US$310 million LOC for upgradation of Hwange Thermal Power Station, additional US$23 million LOC for rehabilitation of Bulawayo Thermal Power Plant and an additional US$19.5 million Line of Credit for Deka Pumping & river Water Intake System; grant for construction of Mahatma Gandhi Convention Centre, US$2.93 million grant for Up-gradation of INDO-Zim Technology Centre and Gifting of 10 Indian made Ambulances, gifting of lifesaving drugs and deputation of experts in five specialized areas.

== Indians in Zimbabwe ==
The beginning of Indian presence in Zimbabwe goes back to about 1890 when Indian plantation workers in apartheid South Africa crossed over to the then Rhodesia under the British South Africa Company. At present, the number of Zimbabweans of Indian origin, who are predominantly from the province of Gujarat, is estimated at 9,000. The community has formed societies on religious lines, though they live in harmony. This PIO community has mainly engaged itself in retail trade or export-import business, while the younger generations have mostly moved out of the country for better opportunities as professionals. A few hundred PIOs hold British/Australian passports. As regards the expatriate Indian community, their number is 500. Some of them are on long-term business/work permits while most are professionals engaged in computer software, accountancy, banking, etc.

By and large, the Indian community is well respected in Zimbabwe and has maintained cordial relations with the majority community. Senator K. G. Patel was a member of the Politburo and Central Committee of the ruling party, he died in 2011 and was given Hero's status in 2012. Mr Bharat Patel is a Supreme Court Judge, Justice (Retd.) Justice Ahmed Ebrahim was awarded Pravasi Bhartiya Samman in 2004. Justice Bharat Patel, a PIO and High Court Judge, was appointed the judge of the Supreme Court of Zimbabwe in May 2013. Mr Raj Modi who was elected as ZANU-PF Member of Parliament from Bulawayo South has been appointed as Deputy Minister of Industry and Commerce in September 2018.

== See also ==
- Africa–India relations
- List of ambassadors of the India to Zimbabwe
- List of ambassadors of the Zimbabwe to India
