= 1984 Indian vice presidential election =

Vice-presidential election in India

← 1979	22 August 1984	1987 →
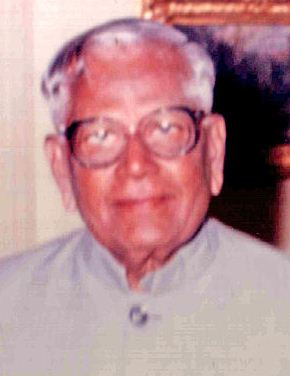

Nominee	R. Venkataraman	B. C. Kamble
Party	INC(I)	RPI (K)
Home state	Tamil Nadu	Maharashtra
Electoral vote	508	207
Percentage	71.05%	28.95%
Vice President before election
Mohammad Hidayatullah
Independent
Elected Vice President
R. Venkataraman
INC(I)

The 1984 Indian vice presidential election was held on 22 August 1984 to elect the vice president of India. R. Venkataraman was elected for the post, after he defeated B. C. Kamble in the election.

== Result ==
Result of the Indian vice-presidential election, 1984
Candidate	Party	Electoral Votes	% of Votes
R. Venkataraman	INC(I)	508	71.05
B. C. Kamble	RPI (K)	207	28.95
Total		715	100.00
Valid Votes		715	95.97
Invalid Votes		30	4.03
Turnout		745	94.54
Abstentions		43	5.46
Electors		788	

== See also ==
- 1982 Indian presidential election
