= 1987 Indian vice presidential election =

Vice-presidential election in India

← 1984	7 September 1987	1992 →
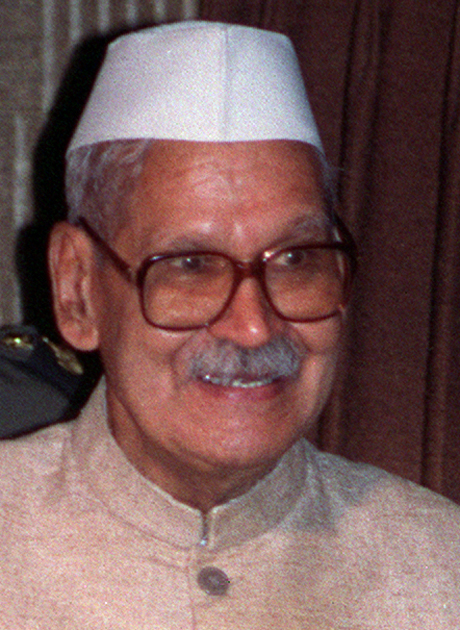
Nominee	Shankar Dayal Sharma
Party	INC(I)
Home state	Madhya Pradesh
Electoral vote	Unopposed
Vice President before election
R. Venkataraman
INC(I)
Elected Vice President
Shankar Dayal Sharma
INC(I)

The 1987 Indian vice presidential election was held in mid-1987 to elect the vice president of India, after the incumbent R. Venkataraman's resignation following his election as President. Shankar Dayal Sharma was declared elected unopposed on the final day of registration, 21 August 1987. Had the election been contested by more than one candidate, it would have occurred on 3 September 1987.

== Schedule ==
The election schedule was announced by the Election Commission of India on 4 August 1987.

S.No.	Poll Event	Date
1.	Last Date for filing nomination	18 August 1987
2.	Date for Scrutiny of nomination	19 August 1987
3.	Last Date for Withdrawal of nomination	21 August 1987
4.	Date of Poll	7 September 1987
5.	Date of Counting	7 September 1987

== Result ==
The Electoral College consisted of 790 members of Lok Sabha and Rajya Sabha. There were 27 candidates who filed their nominations. The Returning Officer rejected the nomination of 26 of them after scrutiny, deeming that only the nomination of Shankar Dayal Sharma was valid. Since he was now the only candidate left, Shankar Dayal Sharma was declared as elected unopposed to the office of the Vice-President. He was sworn in to the office on 3 September 1987.

== See also ==
- 1987 Indian presidential election
