= Dharti Pakar =

Pseudonym of various Indian perennial candidates

Dharti Pakar (also spelt Dharti Pakad; transcribed as Dhartipakar and Dhartipakad as well) (etymology: Dharti = Earth; Pakar = Grasp: "One who clings on") is the nickname of at least three perennial candidates in India who contested unsuccessfully in several elections against top political leaders.

A satirical television show looking at the electoral politics was named Dharti Pakar after a man named Joginder Singh, whose nickname was Dharti Pakar. Mohan Lal, a cloth merchant from Bhopal, also had the nickname of Dharti Pakar for contesting elections against five different Prime Ministers and losing the deposit in all these elections. Nagarmal Bajoria is also known by the nickname of Dharti Pakar; he contested from over 278 constituencies and used donkeys for campaigning in an election. There are others who have contested several elections (see this for example) unsuccessfully, but not necessarily known by the sobriquet.

Dharti Pakar is also a popular nickname in office politics referring to individuals who have no case for meaningful existence in the prevailing environment.
