= Hotte Paksha Rangaswamy =

Indian politician

- Born: 1933
- Died: 7 January 2007 (aged 73–74)
- Occupation: political leader
- Known for: contesting polls
- Political party: Stomach Party

Hotte Paksha Rangaswamy (Kannada: ಹೊಟ್ಟೆ ಪಕ್ಷ ರಂಗಸ್ವಾಮಿ; 1933 – 7 January 2007) was a political leader from the Indian state of Karnataka, who had a penchant for contesting elections. He is a Guinness World Records holder for having contested the highest number of elections - he unsuccessfully did so 86 times.

== Name ==
His name literally translates to Rangaswamy of the Stomach Party in Kannada. This is attributed to his electoral plank of food shortage, which made him popular. He earned the name Hotte Paksha after he floated a political party by that name.

== Electoral penchant ==
He made his electoral debut in 1967 when he contested the Lok Sabha poll against the then railway minister Kengal Hanumanthaiah. He fought 85 further electoral battles.

In the 1970s, he ran against Indira Gandhi in the Chikmagalur by-poll. He also ran against the former Indian Prime Ministers Rajiv Gandhi and P. V. Narasimha Rao. His final electoral battle was against former Chief minister of Karnataka S. M. Krishna.

== Drive against poverty ==
Rangaswamy released his own manifesto in 1967, made food shortage his election plank, and has been known to have sold rice at Rs. 1 a kg during election time, peddling his wares on a bullock cart. He also went across Karnataka cycling for the same cause. He was also known for his proclivity for filing Public Interest Litigation petitions.

== Later life ==
"Hotte Paksha" Rangaswamy, with his trident and matted locks, was a familiar sight across Bangalore. In his later life, he wanted to be known as Swami Ranganathapuri, of Kishkindha Ashram in Ayodhya. He was survived by three sons.

== Trivia ==
- His campaign symbol was an airplane.

== See also ==
- Joginder Singh (politician)
- K. Padmarajan
