= India–Namibia relations =

- India: Namibia

India–Namibia relations are the current and historical relations between India and Namibia. India has a high commissioner in Windhoek and Namibia has a high commissioner in New Delhi. Namibia's high commissioner is also accredited for Bangladesh, the Maldives and Sri Lanka. In 2010, relations were described by Indian officials as "warm and cordial".

== History ==
India was one of SWAPO's earliest supporters during the Namibian liberation movement. The first SWAPO embassy was established in India in 1986. India's observer mission was converted to a full High Commission on Namibia's independence day of 21 March 1990.

India has helped train the Namibian Air Force since its creation in 1995. The two countries work closely in mutual multilateral organisations such as the United Nations, Non-Aligned Movement and the Commonwealth of Nations. Namibia supports expansion of the United Nations Security Council to include a permanent seat for India.

== High level visits ==
A number of high-ranking Indian officials have visited Namibia since independence in 1990; Indian prime minister V. P. Singh, former prime minister Rajiv Gandhi and other high-ranking politicians were in Namibia for its independence day celebrations in 1990. President Shankar Dayal Sharma visited Namibia in 1995 and prime minister Atal Bihari Vajpayee in 1998 as well as numerous ministerial visits. In July 2010, minister of state for external affairs Preneet Kaur visited Namibia ahead of the 13th Exim Bank Conclave on India Africa Project Partnership. President Pranab Mukherjee visited Namibia in 2016.

A number of high-ranking Namibian officials have visited India as well; as of 2010, President Sam Nujoma had visited India 11 times. In August–September 2009, Namibian president Hifikepunye Pohamba made his first visit as president to India. 43 business leaders and politicians accompanied Pohamba on the trip, visiting New Delhi, Mumbai, Bangalore and Agra.

== Economic relations ==
In 2008–09, trade between the two countries stood at approximately US$80 million. Namibia's main imports from India were drugs and pharmaceuticals, chemicals, agricultural machinery, automobile and automobile parts, glass and glassware, plastic and linoleum products. India primarily imported nonferrous metals, ores and metal scarps. Indian products are also exported to neighboring South Africa and re-imported to Namibia as South African imports. Namibian diamonds are often exported to European diamond markets before being again imported to India. In 2009, the first direct sale of Namibian diamonds to India took place. In 2008, two Indian companies won a US$105 million contract from NamPower to lay a high-voltage direct current bi-polar line from Katima Mulilo to Otjiwarongo. Namibia is a beneficiary of the Indian Technical and Economic Cooperation (ITEC) programme for telecommunications professionals from developing countries.

On 3 August 2021, the Namibia high commissioner in India, Gabriel Sinimbo, inaugurated the India Namibia Trade Forum in Chennai, along with the director of the ministry of external affairs Venkatachallam Murugan and the president of the Indian Economic Trade Organization Asif Iqbal. The delegation from South India went to Namibia in March 2020 to conduct the India Namibia business forum with more than 50 Namibian companies.

Namibia mulls direct export of diamonds and semi-precious stones to India.
