= K. Padmarajan =

Indian politician

K. Padmarajan is an Indian perennial candidate known for losing 238 elections. He is from the Indian town of Mettur, Tamil Nadu. The Limca Book of Records listed Padmarajan as the "most unsuccessful candidate" and the Guinness Book of World Records as the candidate with the most contested elections.

== Career ==
Padmarajan is the owner of a tyre repair shop and is a self-described homoeopathic doctor.

== Political career ==
Padmarajan started running for various local offices in 1988. Since then, he has lost all 238 elections that he has run in. He runs as an independent and encourages people to not vote for him. He uses his election failures as a way to inspire new generations to engage with the political process.

Padmarajan has run in 6 presidential, 6 vice-presidential, 32 Lok Sabha, 50 Rajya Sabha, and 73 Parliamentary elections.

== See also ==
- Hotte Paksha Rangaswamy
- Joginder Singh (politician)
