= Shankar Dayal Sharma =

President of India from 1992 to 1997

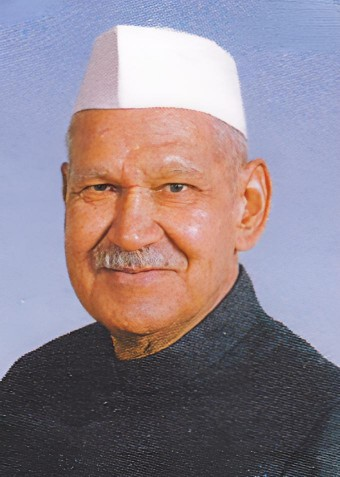
- Official portrait, 1992

President of India
- In office 25 July 1992 – 25 July 1997
- Prime Minister: P. V. Narasimha Rao; Atal Bihari Vajpayee; H. D. Deve Gowda; I. K. Gujral
- Vice President: K. R. Narayanan
- Preceded by: Ramaswamy Venkataraman
- Succeeded by: K. R. Narayanan

Vice President of India
- In office 3 September 1987 – 25 July 1992
- President: Ramaswamy Venkataraman
- Prime Minister: Rajiv Gandhi; V. P. Singh
- Preceded by: Ramaswamy Venkataraman
- Succeeded by: K. R. Narayanan

Governor of Maharashtra
- In office 3 April 1986 – 2 September 1987
- Chief Minister: Shankarrao Chavan
- Preceded by: Kona Prabhakar Rao
- Succeeded by: Kasu Brahmananda Reddy

Governor of Punjab; Administrator of Chandigarh
- In office 26 November 1985 – 2 April 1986
- Chief Minister: Surjit Singh Barnala
- Preceded by: Hokishe Sema
- Succeeded by: Siddhartha Shankar Ray

Governor of Andhra Pradesh
- In office 29 August 1984 – 26 November 1985
- Chief Minister: Nadendla Bhaskara Rao; N. T. Rama Rao
- Preceded by: Thakur Ram Lal
- Succeeded by: Kumudben Manishankar Joshi

Chief Minister of Bhopal State
- In office 31 March 1952 – 31 October 1956
- Preceded by: Office established
- Succeeded by: Office abolished

Cabinet Minister in Madhya Pradesh
- In office 1956–1967
- Departments: Education, Law, Public Works, Revenue, Industry, and Commerce

President of Indian National Congress
- In office 1972–1974
- Preceded by: Jagjivan Ram
- Succeeded by: Devakanta Barua

Personal details
- Born: 19 August 1918 Bhopal, Bhopal State, British India (present-day Madhya Pradesh, India)
- Died: 26 December 1999 (aged 81) New Delhi, Delhi, India
- Party: Indian National Congress
- Spouse: Vimala Sharma (m. 1950)
- Children: 4 (2 sons and 2 daughters)
- Education: University of Allahabad (MA); University of Lucknow (LLM); University of Cambridge (PhD); University of London (DPA)
- Profession: Lawyer; politician

Shankar Dayal Sharma (Hindi: [ˈɕəŋkəɾ d̪əˈjaːl ˈʃəɾmaː]; 19 August 1918 – 26 December 1999) was an Indian lawyer and politician who served as the president of India from 1992 to 1997 and vice president of India from 1987 to 1992.

Born in Bhopal, Sharma studied at Agra, Allahabad and Lucknow and received a doctorate in constitutional law from the University of Cambridge and was a bar-at-law from Lincoln's Inn and a Brandeis Fellow at Harvard University. During 1948–49, Sharma was one of the leaders of the movement for the merger of Bhopal State with India, a cause for which he served eight months' imprisonment.

A member of the Indian National Congress party, Sharma was chief minister (1952–56) of Bhopal State and served as a cabinet minister (1956–1971) in the government of Madhya Pradesh holding several portfolios. Sharma was president of the Bhopal State Congress Committee (1950–52), Madhya Pradesh Congress Committee (1966–68) and of the All India Congress Committee (1972–74). He served as Union Minister for Communications (1974–77) under prime minister Indira Gandhi. Twice elected to the Lok Sabha, Sharma served as governor of Andhra Pradesh (1984–85), Punjab (1985–86) and Maharashtra (1986–87) before being elected unopposed as the vice president of India in 1987. Sharma was elected president of India in 1992 and served till 1997 during which period he dealt with four prime ministers, three of whom he appointed in the last year of his presidency. He was assertive with the P. V. Narasimha Rao ministry, forcing his government to sack a governor, instigating a strong response to the demolition of the Babri Masjid and refusing to sign ordinances presented to him on the eve of elections. His appointment of Atal Bihari Vajpayee as prime minister on the grounds of him being the leader of the largest party in the Parliament attracted widespread criticism especially as Vajpayee was forced to resign in only thirteen days without facing a vote of confidence. Sharma's appointment of H. D. Deve Gowda and I. K. Gujral as prime ministers followed the assurance of support to their candidature by the Congress party but neither government lasted more than a year. Sharma chose not to seek a second term in office and was succeeded to the presidency by K. R. Narayanan.

Sharma died in 1999 and was accorded a state funeral. His samadhi lies at Karma Bhumi in Delhi.

== Early life and education ==
Shankar Dayal Sharma was born on 19 August 1918 in Bhopal, then the capital of the princely state of Bhopal, in a Hindu Gaur Brahmin family. Sharma completed his schooling in Bhopal and then studied at St. John's College, Agra and at the Allahabad and Lucknow universities obtaining a MA in English, Hindi and Sanskrit and an L.L.M. He topped both the courses, was awarded the Chakravarty Gold Medal for social service, and was a thrice swimming champion at Lucknow University and cross country running champion at Allahabad.

He obtained a doctorate in constitutional law from University of Cambridge for his thesis on Interpretation of Legislative Powers under Federal Constitutions and received a diploma in public administration from the University of London.

Sharma began practicing law at Lucknow from 1940 where he taught law at the university and soon joined the Indian National Congress. In 1946, he was admitted to the Lincoln's Inn and taught at Cambridge University during 1946–47. The following year, he was appointed a Brandeis Fellow at Harvard University.

== Political career in Bhopal State ==
During 1948–49, Sharma underwent eight months' imprisonment for his leadership of the popular movement for merging the princely state of Bhopal with India. Although the Nawab of Bhopal had acceded his state to the Dominion of India, he had held out against signing the Instrument of Accession. The popular movement had the support of the Praja Mandal and an interim government with Chatur Narain Malviya as its head was constituted by the Nawab in 1948. However, as the movement gained support, the Nawab dismissed this government. Public pressure and the intervention of V. P. Menon led the Nawab to merge his state with the Indian Union in 1949 with the princely state reconstituted as Bhopal State. (Note: Upon the independence of India and Pakistan, the princely states under the British Raj had the choice of joining either dominion or of remaining independent since the Indian Independence Act only provided for the termination of British suzerainty. With the exceptions of Hyderabad and Kashmir, none of the other princely states opted to be independent owing to geopolitical considerations. The accession of these states to either of the dominions was achieved through an Instrument of Accession which they signed with the dominion government thus surrendering their control over defence, communications and foreign relations to the dominion government. By the Instrument of Merger, the princely states surrendered “full and exclusive authority, jurisdiction and powers in relation to the governance of their States” to the dominion government and settled matters pertaining to their privy purse. The last regnant Nawab of Bhopal, Hamidullah Khan, had signed the Instrument of Accession with the Government of India in August 1947 but not the Instrument of Merger, wanting to retain his state as a separate unit within India. Following the merger agitation, the Nawab signed the Instrument of Merger on 30 April 1949. Thereafter, Bhopal State was formed as a part ‘C' State of Indian Union and came under the administration of a Chief Commissioner on June 1, 1949.)

Sharma was president of the Bhopal State Congress during 1950 to 1952. He was elected to the Legislative Assembly of Bhopal from Berasia in the elections of 1952 and became chief minister of Bhopal State in 1952. In 1956, following the reorganization of states, Bhopal State was merged with the new state of Madhya Pradesh. Sharma played an important role in retaining Bhopal as the capital of this new state.

== Political career in Madhya Pradesh ==
In the elections of 1957, 1962 and 1967, Sharma was elected to the Madhya Pradesh Legislative Assembly from Udaipura as a candidate of the Congress party. During this time he was a cabinet minister in the Madhya Pradesh government and variously held portfolios of education, law, public works, industry and commerce and revenue. As minister for education, he emphasized secular pedagogy in schools and textbooks were revised to avoid religious bias.

During 1967–68, he was president of the Madhya Pradesh Congress Committee and served as general secretary of the party from 1968 to 1972. During the split in 1969, Sharma sided with Indira Gandhi and was removed from party posts by the president S. Nijalingappa but reappointed by Gandhi in her faction of the party.

== Parliamentary career ==
Sharma was elected to the Lok Sabha from Bhopal in the general elections of 1971. The following year, he was made the president of the Indian National Congress by Prime Minister Indira Gandhi. Prior to his appointment as president, Sharma had been a member of the Congress Working Committee since 1967 and general secretary of the Congress party from 1968. As president, Sharma launched a public campaign against the CIA accusing it of being actively involved in fomenting violence in India.

In October 1974, Sharma was appointed Minister of Communications in the Indira Gandhi ministry and was succeeded as president of the Congress by D. K. Barooah. He remained in that post until his defeat in the general election of 1977 by Arif Baig. Sharma was reelected from Bhopal in the general election of 1980.

== Gubernatorial tenures (1984–1987) ==
=== Governor of Andhra Pradesh (1984–1985) ===
On 15 August 1984, N. T. Rama Rao, the chief minister of Andhra Pradesh who led the Telugu Desam Party (TDP) to victory in the state assembly election of 1983, was dismissed from that post by the governor of Andhra Pradesh, Thakur Ram Lal. He appointed N. Bhaskara Rao, who had been the finance minister under Rama Rao, as the new chief minister and gave him a month's time to prove his majority in the Assembly despite the ousted chief minister's claim of being able to prove his own majority in two days' time and evidence that he had the support of the majority of legislators in the assembly. Following widespread protests, Ram Lal resigned on 24 August 1984 and was replaced by Sharma.

Sharma convened a session of the Assembly on 11 September 1984 but as Bhaskara Rao failed to prove his majority within the period of one month stipulated by Ram Lal, Sharma suggested that he resign with effect from 16 September. Bhaskar Rao refused to do so seeking the reconvening of the Assembly a few days later. Sharma then dismissed him and reappointed Rama Rao as chief minister. Rama Rao won the vote of confidence when the Assembly reconvened on 20 September 1984. Soon after, the Rama Rao government called for fresh elections and Sharma dissolved the Assembly in November 1984.

In the Assembly election of 1985, TDP was returned to power with a two-thirds majority with Rama Rao returning as the chief minister. A few months later, Sharma refused to repromulgate three ordinances sent to him by the Rama Rao's government stating that ordinances are required to be ratified by the legislature and that their repromulgation would be a constitutional impropriety. His refusal to repromulgate these ordinances, pertaining to the abolition of offices of part-time village officers, formation of districts and payment of salaries and removal of disqualifications of government employees, a fourth time soured his relation with the state government.

On 31 July 1985, Sharma's daughter Gitanjali and his son-in-law, the Congress politician Lalit Maken, were killed by Sikh militants in retaliation for Maken's alleged role in the anti-Sikh riots of 1984. (Note: The three men involved in the murder - Ranjit Gill 'Kuki', Harjinder Singh Jinda and Sukhdev Singh Sukha were eventually apprehended. Jinda and Sukha were convicted for their involvement in the murder of General A. S. Vaidya, who had led Operation Blue Star, and were awarded the capital punishment Article 72 of the Indian Constitution grants the president of India or the Governor of a state the power to pardon, remit or commute sentences. In a twist of fate, the mercy petitions filed by duo came up before President Sharma in 1992 and were rejected. Consequently, both were hung. Ranjit Gill was arrested in 2003 and sentenced to life imprisonment, which was later commuted with the consent of Maken's daughter Avantika. During his presidency, Sharma rejected all mercy petitions put for his consideration.) Sharma was thereafter transferred to Punjab as governor and was succeeded in Andhra Pradesh by Kumudben Joshi.

=== Governor of Punjab (1985–1986) ===
Sharma succeeded Hokishe Sema as governor of Punjab in November 1985. His appointment came after the assembly elections in that state and in the backdrop of the Rajiv–Longowal Accord which sought to resolve the insurgency in Punjab.

=== Governor of Maharashtra (1986–1987) ===
Sharma was sworn in as governor of Maharashtra in April 1986 and served until September 1987 when he was elected vice president of India.

== Tenure as President and Vice President ==
=== Vice Presidential election ===
Sharma was nominated by the Congress party for the vice-presidential election of 1987. Although 27 candidates had filed nominations, only the nomination filed by Sharma was found valid by the returning officer. After the last date of withdrawal of candidates was over, Sharma was declared elected unanimously on 21 August 1987. Sharma was sworn in as the vice president on 3 September 1987. He was only the third person to be elected unopposed to the vice-presidency.

Sharma, who was also the ex-officio chairman of the Rajya Sabha, offered to quit in February 1988 after his ruling admitting a discussion in the house of the purported extravagance of the then governor of Andhra Pradesh was vociferously objected to by members of the government. Several ministers of the council of ministers led the protests against Sharma's ruling even as Prime Minister Rajiv Gandhi, who was present in the house, chose not to intervene or restrain the members of his party. Sharma's response chastened the protesting members but their request to have the proceedings expunged from Parliament records was turned down by Sharma.

In 1991, following the assassination of Rajiv Gandhi, Sharma was first offered the presidency of the Congress party and the post of prime minister by Sonia Gandhi. He however refused citing ill health and advanced age. Thereafter, P. V. Narasimha Rao was chosen to lead the Congress party.

=== Presidential election ===
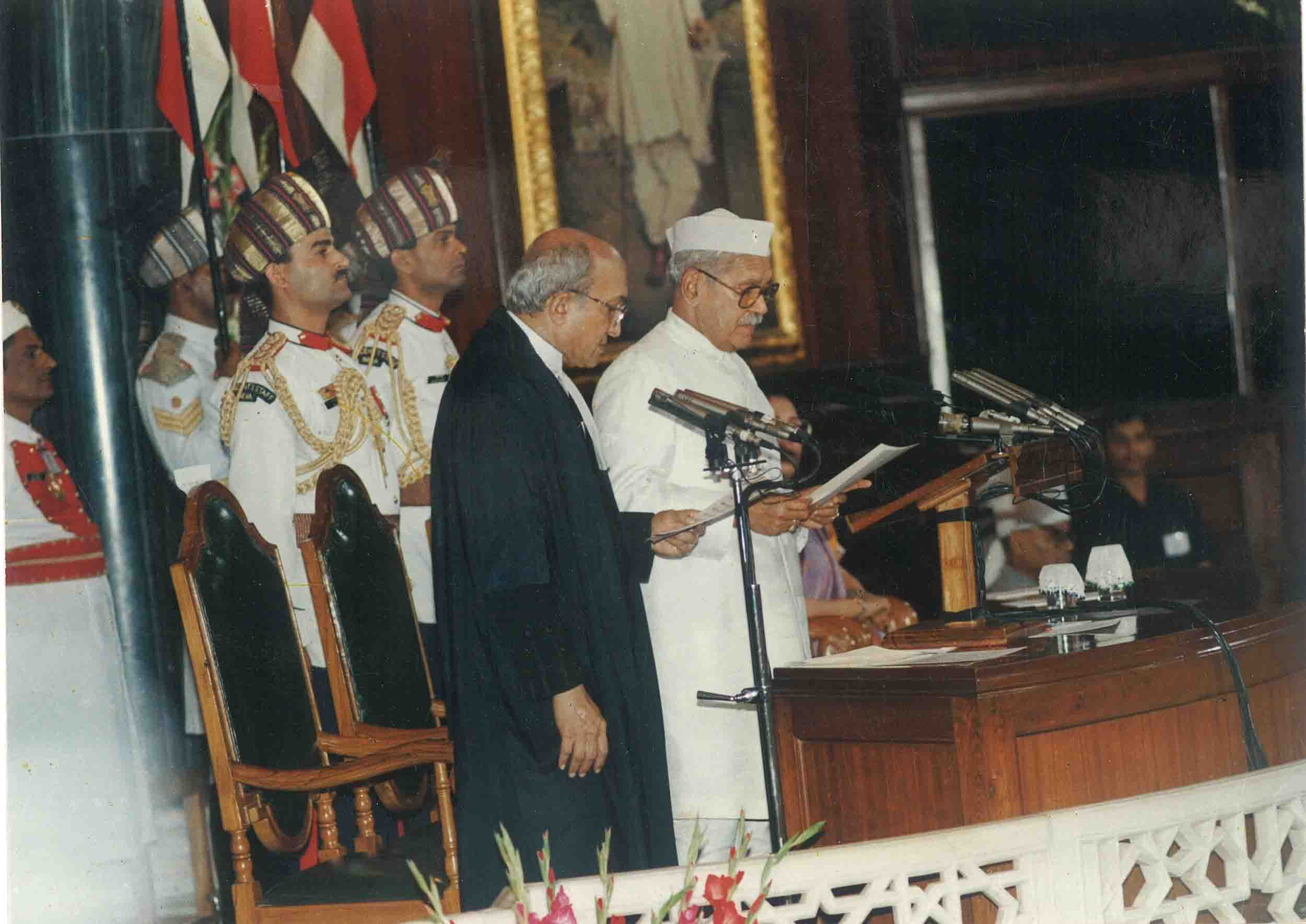
Shankar Dayal Sharma being sworn in as president by Chief Justice M. H. Kania

In June 1992, Sharma was chosen by the Congress party as its candidate for the presidential election of 1992 to succeed R. Venkataraman. His nomination was also supported by the communist parties. The election was held on 13 July 1992 and votes counted three days later. Sharma won 675,804 votes against the 346,485 votes polled by his main opponent George Gilbert Swell, who was the nominee of the opposition Bharatiya Janata Party. Two other candidates – Ram Jethmalani and Joginder Singh – won a small number of votes. Sharma was declared elected on 16 July 1992 and was sworn in as president on 25 July 1992. In his inaugural address, Sharma stated that "Freedom has little meaning without equality and equality has little meaning without social justice" and committed himself to combating terrorism, poverty, disease and communalism in India. The validity of the election was challenged unsuccessfully before the Supreme Court of India.

=== Narasimha Rao government (1992–1996) ===
Sharma's victory was seen as a victory for the Congress party and Prime Minister P. V. Narasimha Rao who headed a minority government. Although seen as a largely ceremonial post, the office of the president is key since the incumbent gets to nominate a head of government in the event of no party gaining a majority in Parliament after national elections or after a government had lost a vote of confidence. The Rao ministry faced three no-confidence motions during its tenure the third of which, held in July 1993, was marred by allegations of bribery and subsequent criminal indictment against Rao himself.

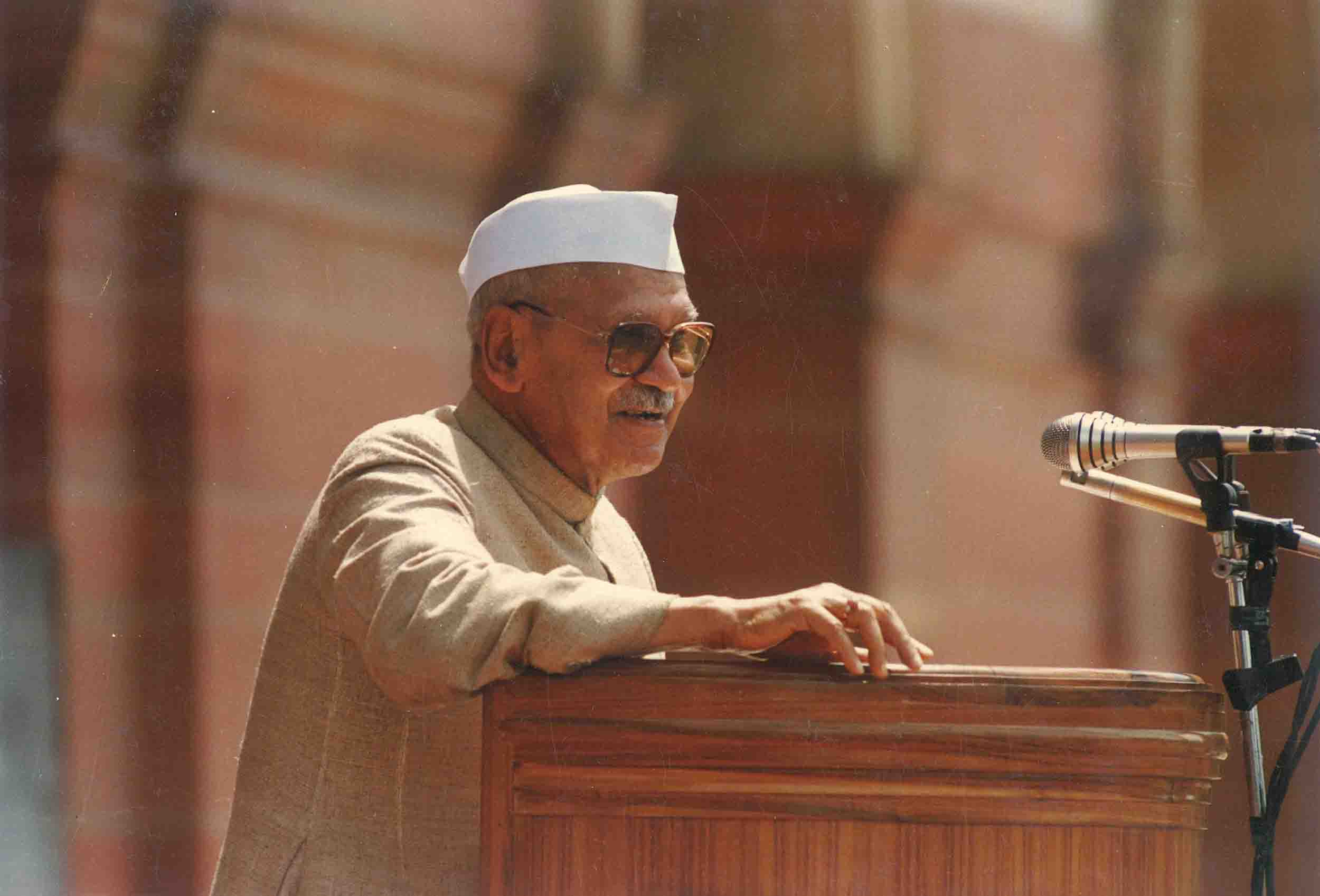
Shankar Dayal Sharma addressing the recipients of Press India Award at Rashtrapati Bhavan

On 6 December 1992, the Babri Masjid in Ayodhya was demolished by a fanatic Hindu mob which led to widespread rioting across India. Sharma expressed his deep anguish and pain at the demolition and condemned the action as being contrary to the traditional ethos of India of respecting all religions and as opposed to the precepts of Hinduism. Sharma's strong condemnation of the incident forced the Rao government to dismiss the state government and impose President's rule in Uttar Pradesh, the state in which Ayodhya is located, the same evening. The following day, the Government of India, by way of a presidential ordinance, acquired 67 acres (27 ha) of land in and around the spot where the mosque had stood and provided that all litigation relating to the disputed area would stand dissolved following the acquisition. In January 1993, a reference was made by Sharma to India's Supreme Court as to whether a Hindu temple or religious structure had existed prior to the construction of the Babri Masjid at the disputed area where the mosque stood. In 1994, by a majority decision, the Court refused to answer the reference as it held it to be contrary to the spirit of secularism and likely to favour a religious community.

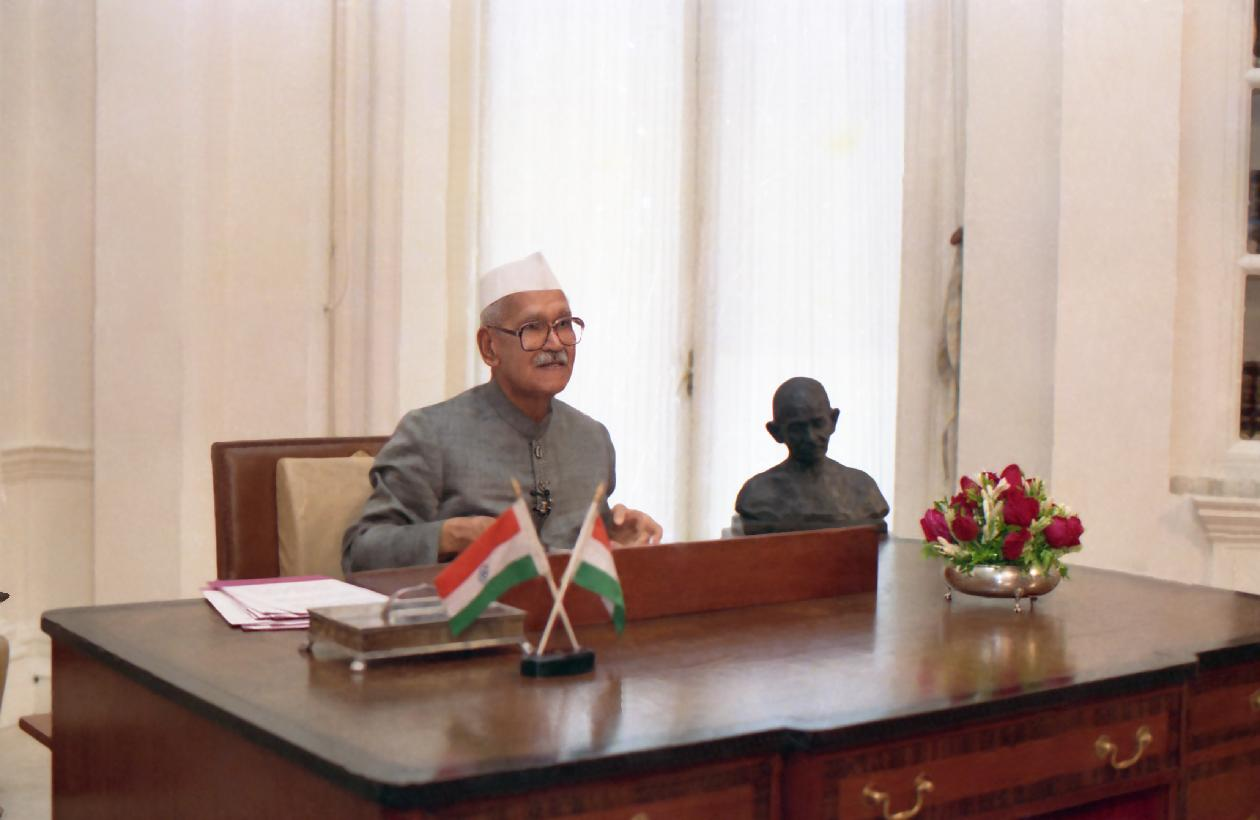
President Sharma addressing the nation on the eve of Independence Day, 1994

In 1995, Sharma dedicated to the Indian people the reconstructed Somnath temple in Gujarat. At the dedication ceremony, Sharma stated that all religions taught the same lesson of unity and placed humanism above all else. The construction of the temple had lasted for fifty years. Questions about its financing, the role of the state in its reconstruction and the presence of constitutional functionaries during the installation of the idol had been marked by debates on secularism in the years following India's independence. The same year, even as the Narasimha Rao government dithered on acting against Sheila Kaul, the governor of Himachal Pradesh, after the Supreme Court expressed its concern that she was using her gubernatorial immunity to avoid criminal proceedings, Sharma forced the government to get her to resign immediately.

Sharma largely enjoyed cordial ties with Narasimha Rao government. In 1996, however, two ordinances sent to him by the Rao government seeking to extend the benefits of reservations in state employment and education for Christian and Muslim Dalits and to reduce the time allowed for campaigning in elections, were returned by Sharma on the grounds that elections were imminent and therefore such decisions should be left to the incoming government.

=== Vajpayee government (16 May 1996 – 28 May 1996) ===
In the general elections of 1996, no party got a majority in Parliament but the Bharatiya Janata Party emerged the largest party winning 160 seats out of 543. The ruling Congress party came second with 139 seats. On 15 May 1996, Sharma invited Atal Bihari Vajpayee, as the leader of the single largest party, to be the prime minister on the condition that he prove his majority on the floor of the house before 31 May. Vajpayee and a cabinet of 11 ministers were sworn in the following day. President Sharma addressed the new parliament on 24 May. (Note: Article 87 of India's constitution provides for the president to address both houses of Parliament in a joint sitting at the commencement of the first session of each year and at the commencement of the first session after each general election. The speech is a statement of the government's policy and plans for the year ahead and the government of the day is responsible for its contents. The speech is then put to a motion of thanks which allows the opposition to critique it and also to suggest amendments. In 1996, the Vajpayee government resigned before it could propose a motion of thanks to the president's address and the Deve Gowda ministry disagreed with the contents of the address. In the event it was decided by consensus that no motion of thanks would be moved on the president's address of 1996 to avoid a political crisis.) The motion for vote of confidence was taken up and discussed on 27 and 28 May. However, before the motion could be put to vote, Vajpayee announced his resignation. The government lasted only 13 days, the shortest in India's history.

President Sharma's decision of selecting Vajpayee as prime minister drew criticism from several quarters. Unlike presidents Ramaswamy Venkataraman or Neelam Sanjiva Reddy who had asked prime ministerial candidates to produce lists of their supporting MPs, thus satisfying themselves that the prime ministers appointed would be able to win a vote of confidence, Sharma had made no such demands of Vajpayee and had appointed him solely by the principle of inviting the leader of the largest party in Parliament. Also, unlike President Venkataraman, Sharma issued no press communiqués outlining the rationale for his decision. The Communist parties criticized Sharma's decision as he had been elected president with their backing but had chosen to invite their ideological opponent to be the prime minister.

Sharma's decision to invite Vajpayee has been attributed to the fact that no party had staked their claim to form the government and the United Front, a coalition of thirteen parties, took time to decide on their leader and in getting the Congress party to extend its support to them. Sharma's deadline of two weeks given to Vajpayee to prove his majority was much shorter than the time given to prime ministers in previous instances and was a move to discourage horse trading.

=== Deve Gowda government (1996–1997) ===
Following Vajpayee's resignation, Sharma asked him to continue as caretaker prime minister and appointed H. D. Deve Gowda as prime minister on 28 May 1996 after being assured of the support of the Congress party for his candidature. Gowda and a 21-member council of ministers sworn in on 1 June and won a vote of confidence within the deadline of twelve days set by Sharma. Gowda, a former chief minister of Karnataka, was India's third prime minister in as many weeks and headed a diverse coalition comprising regional parties, leftists and lower caste Hindu politicians. He was also India's first prime minister not conversant in its official language, Hindi. The government lasted ten months and was dependent on the Congress party which, under its new president Sitaram Kesri, withdrew support in April 1997 alleging failure on the part of the prime minister in preventing the growth of Hindu nationalist political parties in North India. Sharma then directed Gowda to seek a vote of confidence in Parliament. Gowda lost the vote of confidence on 11 April 1997 and continued to head a caretaker government as President Sharma considered a further course of action.

=== I. K. Gujral government ===
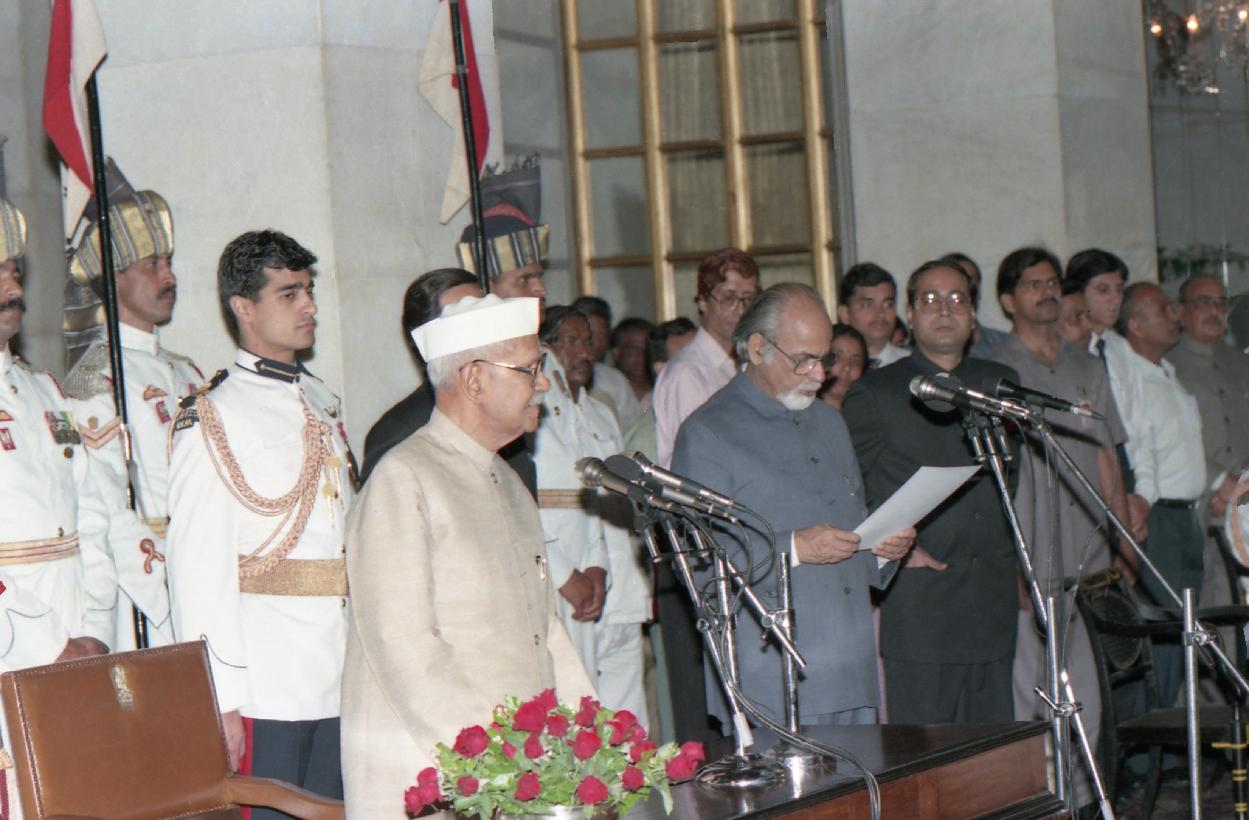
I. K. Gujral was sworn in as prime minister on April 21, 1997.

On 21 April 1997, Inder Kumar Gujral, who had been the foreign minister under Deve Gowda, was sworn in as prime minister and was given two days time win a vote of confidence in Parliament. He was the third prime minister to be sworn in by Sharma and his government would last 322 days when the Congress party again withdrew support to the United Front ministry.

=== State visits ===
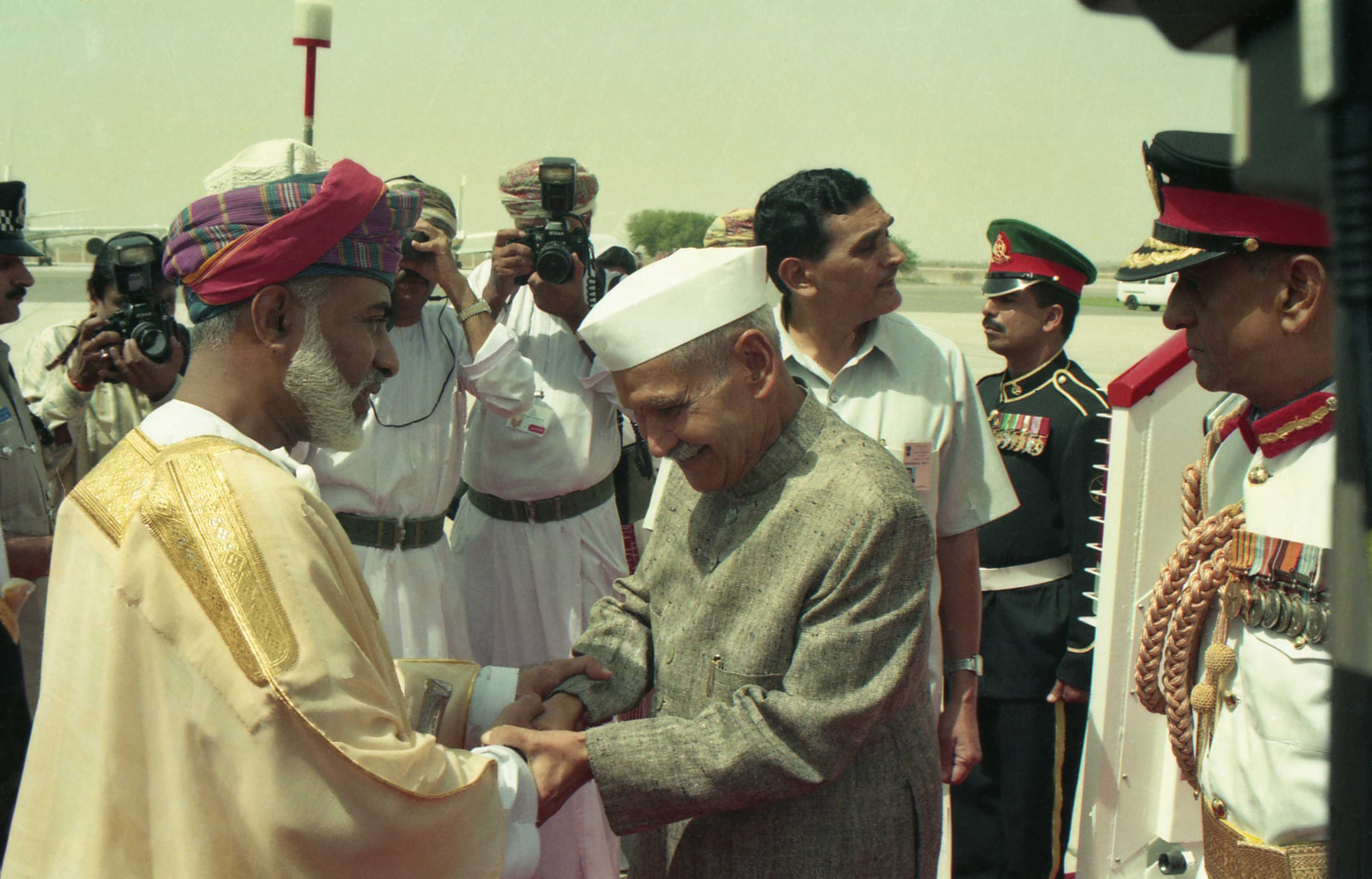
President Sharma being received at the Muscat Airport by the sultan of Oman, Qaboos bin Said during his state visit in 1996.

As president, Sharma led state visits to Bulgaria, Chile, the Czech Republic, Greece, Hungary, Italy, Namibia, Oman, (Note: On his visit to Oman, Sultan Qaboos personally received Sharma at the airport setting aside protocol. Qaboos silenced critics stating that he had only come to receive his guru. Qaboos had received his secondary education in Pune where he had been tutored privately by Sharma.) Poland, Romania, Slovakia, Trinidad and Tobago, Turkey, Ukraine, the United Kingdom, and Zimbabwe. (Note: In 1996, Zimbabwe made the diplomatic gift of a pair of African elephants which arrived in India in 1998. The male, named Shankar in honour of President Sharma, lived alone in the Delhi Zoo after its companion Bombai, named after the wife of the then ambassador of Zimbabwe to India, died in 2005. After the elephant's plight was taken up by animal rights activists, the Delhi High Court ordered the zoo to explore the possibility of getting Shankar a mate. As of October 2022, the Delhi Zoo had shortlisted South Africa as a source for procuring a female companion for Shankar.) At the end of his tenure, he chose not to seek a second term in office and was succeeded to the presidency by Vice President K. R. Narayanan.

== Death ==
Sharma died due to heart attack at the Escorts Heart Institute, Delhi on 26 December 1999. He was married to Vimala and had two sons and a daughter. The Government of India declared seven days of national mourning in his honour. A state funeral was accorded to him and he was cremated on 27 December 1999. His samadhi lies at Karma Bhumi, Delhi.

== Honours ==
- Sharma was made an honorary bencher and Master of Lincoln's Inn in 1993.
- He was conferred an honorary degree of doctor of law by the University of Cambridge.
- He was also conferred with honorary doctorates from the Sofia University,
- Honorary doctorates from the University of Bucharest,
- Honorary doctorates from the Taras Shevchenko National University of Kyiv and several Indian universities.

== Bibliography ==
Sharma was the author of several books in English and Hindi. These include The Congress Approach to International Affairs, Studies in Indo-Soviet cooperation, Rule of Law and Role of Police, Jawaharlal Nehru: The Maker of Modern Commonwealth, Eminent Indians, Chetna Ke Strot and Hindi Bhasha Aur Sanskriti. He was also editor of the Lucknow Law Journal, Socialist India, Jyoti and the Ilm-o-Nur.

== Commemoration ==
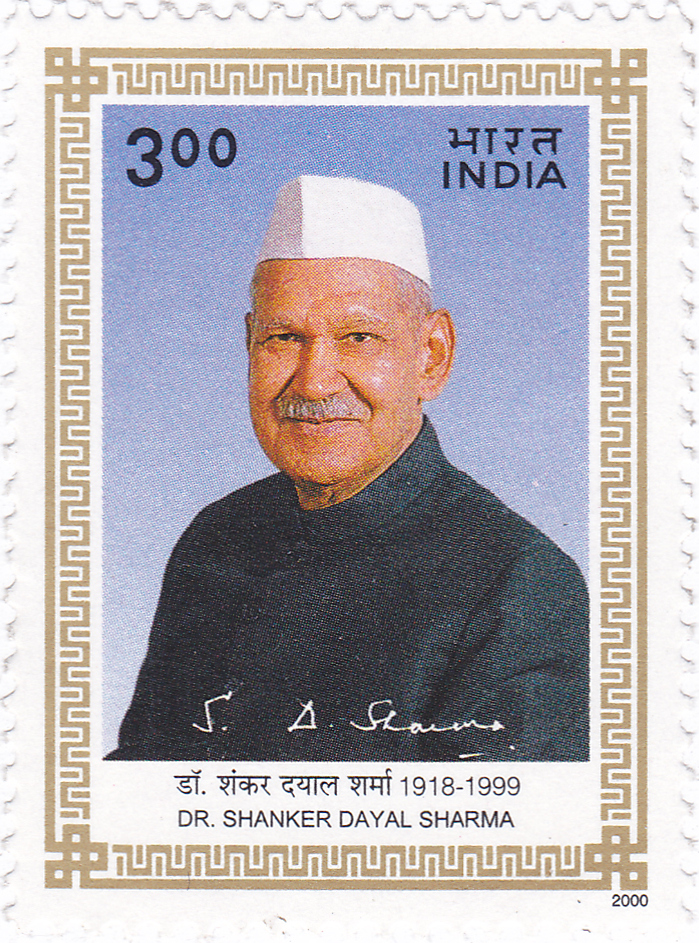
A commemorative postage stamp of India featuring President Sharma

Dr. Shankar Dayal Sharma, a 1999 short documentary feature by A. K. Goorha covers his life and presidency. It was produced by the Government of India's Films Division. In 2000, a commemorative postage stamp was issued in his honour by India Post. In Bhopal, the Dr. Shankar Dayal Sharma Ayurvedic College & Hospital and the Dr. Shankar Dayal Sharma College are named after him. Dr. Shankar Dayal Sharma Institute of Democracy under the University of Lucknow was inaugurated in 2009.

The Shankar Dayal Sharma Gold Medal, awarded annually at several universities in India, was instituted in 1994 from endowments made by Sharma.

== Notes ==
Lok Sabha
Preceded by Jagannathrao Joshi	Member of Parliament for Bhopal; 1971 – 1977	Succeeded by Arif Beg
Preceded by Arif Beg	Member of Parliament for Bhopal; 1980 – 1984	Succeeded by K. N. Pradhan
Political offices
Preceded by Thakur Ram Lal	Governor of Andhra Pradesh; 29 August 1984 – 26 November 1985	Succeeded by Kumudben Manishankar Joshi
Preceded by Hokishe Sema	Governor of Punjab; 26 November 1985 – 2 April 1986	Succeeded by Siddhartha Shankar Ray
Preceded by Hokishe Sema	Administrator of Chandigarh; 1985–1986	Succeeded by Siddhartha Shankar Ray
Preceded by Kona Prabhakar Rao	Governor of Maharashtra; 3 April 1986 – 2 September 1987	Succeeded by Kasu Brahmananda Reddy
Preceded by Ramaswamy Venkataraman	Vice-President of India; 3 September 1987 – 25 July 1992	Succeeded by K. R. Narayanan
Preceded by Ramaswamy Venkataraman	President of India; 25 July 1992 – 25 July 1997	Succeeded by K. R. Narayanan
