= Ordinance (India) =

Temporary law promulgated by the president

Ordinances are laws that are promulgated by the President of India on the recommendation of the Union Cabinet, which will have the same effect as an Act of Parliament. They can only be issued when Parliament is not in session. They enable the Indian government to take immediate legislative action. Ordinances cease to operate either if Parliament does not approve of them within six weeks of reassembly, or if both Houses pass disapproving resolutions. It is also compulsory for a session of Parliament to be held within six months. A total of 679 ordinances have been issued from 1950–2014.

== List of Central Government Ordinances since 2001 ==
Year	Ord. No.	Title of Ordinance	Ref.
2001	1	Indian Council of World Affairs Ordinance, 2001	
2001	2	Taxation Laws (Amendment) Ordinance, 2001	
2001	3	Indian Council of World Affairs (Second) Ordinance, 2001	
2001	4	Food Corporations (Amendment) Ordinance, 2001	
2001	5	Live-stock Importation (Amendment) Ordinance, 2001	
2001	6	Institute of Technology (Amendment) Ordinance, 2001	
2001	7	Companies (Amendment) Ordinance, 2001	
2001	8	Passports (Amendment) Ordinance, 2001	
2001	9	Prevention of Terrorism Ordinance, 2001	
2001	10	Institute of Technology (Amendment) Second Ordinance, 2001	
2001	11	Passports (Amendment) Second Ordinance, 2001	
2001	12	Prevention of Terrorism (Second) Ordinance, 2001	
2002	1	Central Excise Tariff (Amendment) Ordinance, 2002	
2002	2	Securitisation and Reconstruction of Financial Assets and Enforcement of Security Interest Ordinance, 2002	
2002	3	Securitisation and Reconstruction of Financial Assets and Enforcement of Security Interest (Second) Ordinance, 2002	
2002	4	Representation of the People (Amendment) Ordinance, 2002	
2002	5	Unit Trust of India (Transfer of Undertaking and Repeal) Ordinance, 2002	
2002	6	Securities and Exchange Board of India (Amendment) Ordinance, 2002	
2002	7	Delhi Metro Railway (Operation and Maintenance) Ordinance, 2002	
2003	1	Customs Tariff (Amendment) Ordinance, 2003	
2003	2	Taxation Laws (Amendment) Ordinance, 2003	
2003	3	National Tax Tribunal Ordinance, 2003	
2003	4	Prevention of Terrorism (Amendment) Ordinance, 2003	
2003	5	Representation of the People (Amendment) Ordinance, 2003	
2003	6	Delimitation (Amendment) Ordinance, 2003	
2003	7	Indian Telegraph (Amendment) Ordinance, 2003	
2003	8	Indian Medicine Central Council (Amendment) Ordinance, 2003	
2004	1	Prevention of Terrorism (Repeal) Ordinance, 2004	
2004	2	Unlawful Activities (Prevention) Amendment Ordinance, 2004	
2004	3	Banking Regulation (Amendment) and Miscellaneous Provisions Ordinance, 2004	
2004	4	Securities Laws (Amendment) Ordinance, 2004	
2004	5	Enforcement of Security Interest and Recovery of Debts Laws (Amendment) Ordinance, 2004	
2004	6	National Commission for Minority Educational Institutions Ordinance, 2004	
2004	7	Patents (Amendment) Ordinance, 2004	
2004	8	Pension Fund Regulatory and Development Authority Ordinance, 2004	
2005	1	Central Excise Laws (Amendment and Validation) Ordinance, 2005	
2005	2	Citizenship (Amendment) Ordinance, 2005	
2005	3	Manipur University Ordinance, 2005	
2005	4	Taxation Laws (Amendment) Ordinance, 2005	
2006	1	National Commission for Minority Educational Institutions (Amendment) Ordinance, 2006	
2006	2	National Council for Teacher Education (Amendment and Validation) Ordinance, 2006	
2006	3	Indian Telegraph (Amendment) Ordinance, 2006	
2007	1	Banking Regulation (Amendment) Ordinance, 2007	
2007	2	National Institute of Pharmaceutical Education and Research (Amendment) Ordinance, 2007	
2007	3	National Tax Tribunal (Amendment) Ordinance, 2007	
2007	4	Sports Broadcasting Signals (Mandatory Sharing with Prasar Bharati) Ordinance, 2007	
2007	5	State Bank of India (Amendment) Ordinance, 2007	
2007	6	National Capital Territory of Delhi Law (Special Provisions) Ordinance, 2007	
2007	7	National Capital Territory of Delhi Law (Special Provisions) Second Ordinance, 2007	
2007	8	Payment of Bonus (Amendment) Ordinance, 2007	
2008	1	Delimitation (Amendment) Ordinance, 2008	
2008	2	Railways (Amendment) Ordinance, 2008	
2008	3	Forward Contracts (Regulation) Amendment Ordinance, 2008	
2008	4	Sugar Development Fund (Amendment) Ordinance, 2008	
2008	5	Prasar Bharti (Broadcasting Corporation of India) Amendment Ordinance, 2008	
2008	6	Food Safety and Standards (Amendment) Ordinance, 2008	
2008	7	Employee's State Insurance (Amendment) Ordinance, 2008	
2008	8	Agricultural and Processed Food Products Export Development Authority (Amendment) Ordinance, 2008	
2009	1	High Court and Supreme Court Judges (Salaries and Conditions of Service) Amendment Ordinance, 2009	
2009	2	Central Industrial Security Force (Amendment) Ordinance, 2009	
2009	3	Central Universities Ordinance 2009	
2009	4	Meghalaya Appropriation (Vote on Account) Ordinance, 2009	
2009	5	Meghalaya Appropriation Ordinance, 2009	
2009	6	Competition (Amendment) Ordinance, 2009	
2009	7	Jharkhand Contingency Fund (Amendment) Ordinance, 2009	
2009	8	Central Universities (Amendment) Ordinance, 2009	
2009	9	Essential Commodities (Amendment And Validation) Ordinance, 2009	
2010	1	Ancient Monuments and Archaeological Sites and Remains (Amendment & Validation) Ordinance, 2010	
2010	2	Indian Medical Council (Amendment) Ordinance, 2010	
2010	3	Securities and Insurance Laws (Amendment and Validation) Ordinance, 2010	
2010	4	Enemy Property (Amendment and Validation) Ordinance, 2010	
2011	1	Indian Medical Council (Amendment) Ordinance, 2011	
2011	2	Indian Institute of Information Technology, Design and Manufacturing, Kancheepuram Ordinance, 2011	
2011	3	Cable Television Networks (Regulation) Amendment Ordinance, 2011	
2012	1	All-India Institute of Medical Sciences (Amendment) Ordinance, 2012	
2013	1	Securities and Exchange Board of India (Amendment) Ordinance, 2013	
2013	2	Readjustment of Representation of Scheduled Castes and Scheduled Tribes in Parliamentary and Assembly Constituencies Ordinance, 2013	
2013	3	Criminal Law (Amendment) Ordinance, 2013	
2013	4	Indian Medical Council (Amendment) Ordinance, 2013	
2013	5	Securities and Exchange Board of India (Amendment) Second Ordinance, 2013	
2013	6	Readjustment of Representation of Scheduled Castes and Scheduled Tribes in Parliamentary and Assembly Constituencies (Second) Ordinance, 2013	
2013	7	National Food Security Ordinance, 2013	
2013	8	Securities Laws (Amendment) Ordinance, 2013	
2013	9	Securities Laws (Amendment) Second Ordinance, 2013	
2013	10	Readjustment of Representation of Scheduled Castes and Scheduled Tribes in Parliamentary and Assembly Constituencies (Third) Ordinance, 2013	
2013	11	Indian Medical Council (Amendment) Second Ordinance, 2013	
2014	1	Scheduled Castes And The Scheduled Tribes (Prevention of Atrocities) Amendment Ordinance, 2014	
2014	2	Securities Laws (Amendment) Odinance, 2014	
2014	3	Telecom Regulatory Authority of India (Amendment) Ordinance, 2014	
2014	4	Andhra Pradesh Reorganisation (Amendment) Ordinance, 2014	
2014	5	Coal Mines (Special Provisions) Ordinance, 2014	
2014	6	Textile Undertakings (Nationalisation) Laws (Amendment and Validation) Ordinance, 2014	
2014	7	Coal Mines (Special Provisions) Second Ordinance, 2014	
2014	8	Insurance Laws (Amendment) Ordinance, 2014	
2014	9	Right to Fair Compensation and Transparency In Land Acquisition, Rehabilitation and Resettlement (Amendment) Ordinance, 2014	
2015	1	Citizenship (Amendment) Ordinance, 2015	
2015	2	Motor Vehicles (Amendment) Ordinance, 2015	
2015	3	Mines And Minerals (Development and Regulation) Amendment Ordinance, 2015	
2015	4	Right to Fair Compensation and Transparency in Land Acquisition, Rehabilitation and Resettlement (Amendment) Ordinance, 2015	
2015	5	Right to Fair Compensation and Transparency in Land Acquisition, Rehabilitation and Resettlement (Amendment) Second Ordinance, 2015	
2015	6	Negotiable Instruments (Amendment) Ordinance, 2015	
2015	7	Negotiable Instruments (Amendment) Second Ordinance, 2015	
2015	8	Commercial Courts, Commercial Division and Commercial Appellate Division of High Courts Ordinance, 2015	
2015	9	Arbitration and Conciliation (Amendment) Ordinance, 2015	
2016	1	Enemy Property (Amendment and Validation) Ordinance, 2016	
2016	2	Uttarakhand Appropriation (Vote on Account) Ordinance, 2016	
2016	3	Enemy Property (Amendment and Validation) Second Ordinance, 2016	
2016	4	Indian Medical Council (Amendment) Ordinance, 2016	
2016	5	Dentists (Amendment) Ordinance, 2016	
2016	6	Enemy Property (Amendment and Validation) Third Ordinance, 2016	
2016	7	Enemy Property (Amendment and Validation) Fourth Ordinance, 2016	
2016	8	Enemy Property (Amendment and Validation) Fifth Ordinance, 2016	
2016	9	Payment of Wages (Amendment) Ordinance, 2016	
2016	10	Specified Bank Notes (Cessation of Liabilities) Ordinance, 2016	
2017	1	Banking Regulation (Amendment) Ordinance, 2017	
2017	2	Punjab Municipal Corporation Law (Extension to Chandigarh) Ordinance, 2017	
2017	3	Central Goods and Services Tax (Extension to Jammu and Kashmir) Ordinance, 2017	
2017	4	Integrated Goods and Services Tax (Extension to Jammu and Kashmir) Ordinance, 2017	
2017	5	Goods and Services Tax (Compensation to States) Amendment Ordinance, 2017	
2017	6	Indian Forest (Amendment) Ordinance, 2017	
2017	7	Insolvency and Bankruptcy Code (Amendment) Ordinance, 2017	
2018	1	Fugitive Economic Offenders Ordinance, 2018	
2018	2	Criminal Law (Amendment) Ordinance, 2018	
2018	3	Commercial Courts, Commercial Division and Commercial Appellate Division of High Courts (Amendment) Ordinance, 2018	
2018	4	Homeopathy Central Council (Amendment) Ordinance, 2018	
2018	5	National Sports University Ordinance, 2018	
2018	6	Insolvency and Bankruptcy Code (Amendment) Ordinance, 2018	
2018	7	Muslim Women (Protection Of Rights On Marriage) Ordinance, 2018	
2018	8	Indian Medical Council (Amendment) Ordinance, 2018	
2018	9	Companies (Amendment) Ordinance, 2018	
2019	1	Muslim Women (Protection of Rights on Marriage) Ordinance, 2019	
2019	2	Indian Medical Council (Amendment) Ordinance, 2019	
2019	3	Companies (Amendment) Ordinance, 2019	
2019	4	Muslim Women (Protection of Rights on Marriage) Second Ordinance, 2019	
2019	5	Indian Medical Council (Amendment) Second Ordinance, 2019	
2019	6	Companies (Amendment) Second Ordinance, 2019	
2019	7	Banning of Unregulated Deposit Schemes Ordinance, 2019	
2019	8	Jammu and Kashmir Reservation (Amendment) Ordinance, 2019	
2019	9	Aadhar and Other Laws (Amendment) Ordinance, 2019	
2019	10	New Delhi International Arbitration Centre Ordinance, 2019	
2019	11	Homeopathy Central Council (Amendment) Ordinance, 2019	
2019	12	Special Economic Zones (Amendment) Ordinance, 2019	
2019	13	Central Educational Institutions (Reservation In Teachers’ Cadre) Ordinance, 2019	
2019	14	Prohibition of Electronic Cigarettes (Production, Manufacture, Import, Export, Transport, Sale, Distribution, Storage and Advertisement) Ordinance, 2019	
2019	15	Taxation Laws (Amendment) Ordinance, 2019	
2019	16	Insolvency and Bankruptcy Code (Amendment) Ordinance, 2019	
2020	1	Mineral Laws (Amendment) Ordinance, 2020	
2020	2	Taxation and Other Laws (Relaxation of Certain Provision) Ordinance, 2020	
2020	3	Salary, Allowances and Pension of Members of Parliament (Amendment) Ordinance, 2020	
2020	4	Salaries and Allowances of Ministers (Amendment) Ordinance, 2020	
2020	5	Epidemic Diseases (Amendment) Ordinance, 2020	
2020	6	Homoeopathy Central Council (Amendment) Ordinance, 2020	
2020	7	Indian Medicine Central Council (Amendment) Ordinance, 2020	
2020	8	Essential Commodities (Amendment) Ordinance, 2020	
2020	9	Insolvency and Bankruptcy Code (Amendment) Ordinance, 2020	
2020	10	Farmers’ Produce Trade and Commerce (Promotion and Facilitation) Ordinance, 2020	
2020	11	Farmers (Empowerment and Protection) Agreement on Price Assurance and Farm Services Ordinance, 2020	
2020	12	Banking Regulation (Amendment) Ordinance, 2020	
2020	13	Commission for Air Quality Management in National Capital Region and Adjoining Areas Ordinance, 2020	
2020	14	Arbitration and Conciliation (Amendment) Ordinance, 2020	
2021	1	Jammu and Kashmir Reorganisation (Amendment) Ordinance, 2021	
2021	2	Tribunals Reforms (Rationalisation and Conditions of Service) Ordinance, 2021	
2021	3	Insolvency and Bankruptcy Code (Amendment) Ordinance, 2021	
2021	4	Commission for Air Quality Management in National Capital Region and Adjoining Areas Ordinance, 2021	
2021	5	Indian Medicine Central Council (Amendment) Ordinance, 2021	
2021	6	Homoeopathy Central Council (Amendment) Ordinance, 2021	
2021	7	Essential Defence Services Ordinance, 2021	
2021	8	Narcotic Drugs and Psychotropic Substances (Amendment) Ordinance, 2021	
2021	9	Central Vigilance Commission (Amendment) Ordinance, 2021	
2021	10	Delhi Special Police Establishment (Amendment) Ordinance, 2021	
2023	1	Government of National Capital Territory of Delhi (Amendment) Ordinance, 2023	
2025	1	Manipur Goods and Services Tax (Amendment) Ordinance, 2025	
2025	2	Manipur Goods and Services Tax (Second Amendment) Ordinance, 2025	
2026	1	Supreme Court (Number of Judges) Amendment Ordinance, 2026	
2026	2	Income-tax (Amendment) Ordinance, 2026	
