= Republican Party of India (Kamble) =

Political party in India

Flag used by various Dalit parties of India

The Republican Party of India (Kamble) is a political party in India, a splinter group of the old Ambedkarite Republican Party of India. The leader of the party is B. C. Kamble. Its presence is limited to Maharashtra among Dalits.

Recently, all factions of RPI except Prakash Ambedkar's Bharipa Bahujan Mahasangha attempted to reunite and form a united "Republican Party of India".
