= Ramaswamy Venkataraman =

President of India from 1987 to 1992

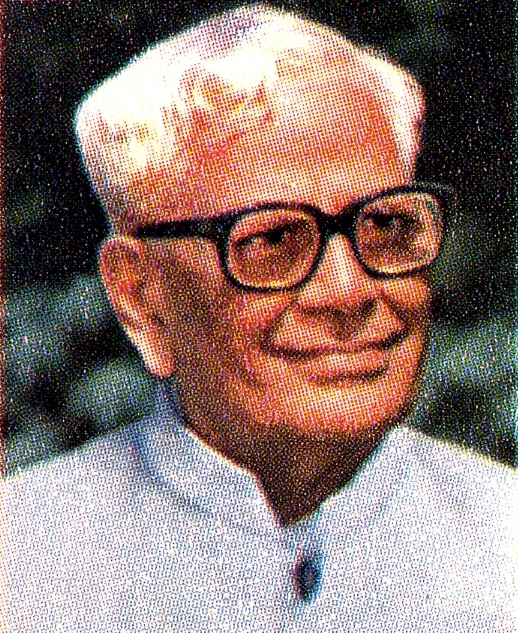
- Official portrait, c. 1987

President of India
- In office 25 July 1987 – 25 July 1992
- Prime Minister: Rajiv Gandhi; V. P. Singh; Chandra Shekhar; P. V. Narasimha Rao
- Vice President: Shankar Dayal Sharma
- Preceded by: Zail Singh
- Succeeded by: Shankar Dayal Sharma

Vice President of India
- In office 31 August 1984 – 24 July 1987
- President: Zail Singh
- Prime Minister: Indira Gandhi; Rajiv Gandhi
- Preceded by: Mohammad Hidayatullah
- Succeeded by: Shankar Dayal Sharma

Union Minister of Home Affairs
- In office 22 June 1982 – 2 September 1982
- Prime Minister: Indira Gandhi
- Preceded by: Zail Singh
- Succeeded by: Prakash Chandra Sethi

Union Minister of Defence
- In office 15 January 1982 – 2 August 1984
- Prime Minister: Indira Gandhi
- Preceded by: Indira Gandhi
- Succeeded by: Shankarrao Chavan

Union Minister of Finance
- In office 14 January 1980 – 15 January 1982
- Prime Minister: Indira Gandhi
- Preceded by: Hemvati Nandan Bahuguna
- Succeeded by: Pranab Mukherjee

Personal details
- Born: 4 December 1910 Rajamadam, Thanjavur, British India (present-day Tamil Nadu, India)
- Died: 27 January 2009 (aged 98) New Delhi, Delhi, India
- Party: Indian National Congress
- Spouse: Janaki Venkataraman (m. 1938)
- Children: 3
- Education: Loyola College, University of Madras
- Profession: Lawyer; politician
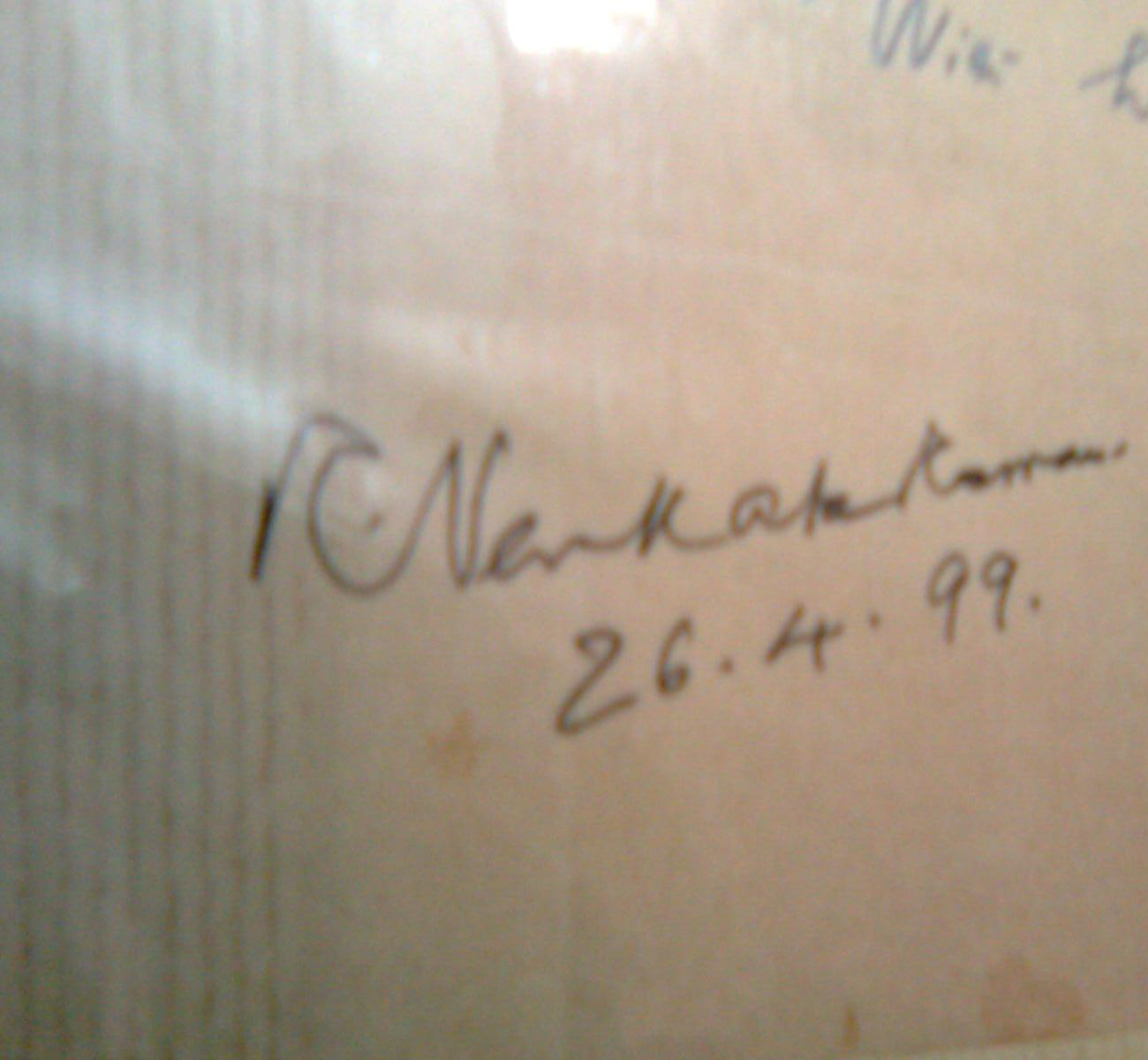
- Signature

Ramaswamy Venkataraman (4 December 1910 – 27 January 2009), also known as R. Venkataraman, was an Indian lawyer, independence activist and politician who served as a union minister and as the vice president of india and president of India. Venkataraman was born in Rajamadam village in Tanjore district, Madras Presidency. He studied law and practised in the Madras High Court and the Supreme Court of India. In his youth, he was an activist for the Indian independence movement, and he participated in the Quit India Movement. He was appointed as the member of the Constituent Assembly and the provisional cabinet. He was elected to the Lok Sabha four times and served as Union Finance Minister and Defence Minister. In 1984, he was elected as the vice president of India and in 1987, he became the president of India and served from 1987 to 1992. He also served as a state minister under K. Kamaraj and M. Bhaktavatsalam. He is referred to as the Father of Industrialisation of Tamilnadu

== Early life ==
Venkataraman was born in a Tamil Brahmin family in Rajamadam village near Pattukottai, Tanjore district in Madras Presidency, British India, on 4 December 1910. He had his school education in Govt Boys Higher Secondary School, Pattukottai and undergraduation in National College, Tiruchirappalli.

Educated locally and in the city of Madras (now Chennai), Venkataraman obtained his master's degree in economics from Loyola College, Madras. He later qualified in Law from the Law College, Madras. Venkataraman was enrolled in the Madras High Court in 1935 and in the Supreme Court in 1951.

While practising law, Venkataraman was drawn into the movement for India's freedom from Britain's colonial subjugation. His active participation in the Indian National Congress's celebrated resistance to the British Government, the Quit India Movement of 1942, resulted in his detention for two years under the Defence of India Rules. Venkataraman's interest in the law continued during this period. In 1946, when the transfer of power from British to Indian hands was imminent, the Government of India included him in the panel of lawyers sent to Malaya and Singapore to defend Indian nationals charged with offences of collaboration during the Japanese occupation of those two places. In the years 1947 to 1950, Venkataraman served as Secretary of the Madras Provincial Bar Federation.

== Political career ==
Law and trade activity led to Venkataraman's increasing association with politics. He was a member of constituent assembly that drafted India's constitution. In 1950, he was elected to free India's Provisional Parliament (1950–1952) and to the First Parliament (1952–1957). During his term of legislative activity, Venkataraman attended the 1952 Session of the Metal Trades Committee of International Labour Organisation as a workers' delegate. He was a member of the Indian Parliamentary Delegation to the Commonwealth Parliamentary Conference in New Zealand. Venkataraman was also Secretary to the Congress Parliamentary Party in 1953–1954.

Venkatraman was reelected to Parliament from Thanjavur in the general election of 1957 with an improved majority of 37,000 votes. He however resigned the seat and joined the Madras government at the invitation of its Chief Minister, K. Kamaraj. Venkataraman was sworn in as Minister for Industries on 26 April 1957 and was allotted several ministries including those of Labour and Co-operation, Commercial Taxes and Nationalised Transport, Textiles, Mines and Minerals and Companies and was elected to the Madras Legislative Council in the biennial elections conducted in March 1958.

In the assembly election of 1962, the Congress Party under K Kamaraj was returned to power. Venkataraman was retained as minister in charge of the same ministries during the Kamaraj Ministry which lasted 2 October 1963 and under Chief Minister M. Bhaktavatsalam who succeeded Kamaraj. Venkataraman himself was sworn in as Minister in the Bhaktavatsalam Ministry only on 23 October 1963, as he was in New York City to attend the session of the United Nations Administrative Tribunal. Venkataraman was reelected to the Council in the biennial elections of March 1964 and remained the leader of the house in the council until after the assembly elections of 1967.

As Minister of Industries, Venkataraman proved to be an able administrator who ushered in a period of industrial development in Madras. He championed the idea of industrial estates, the first of which was established at Guindy, and succeeded in getting investments in major public sector undertakings such as the Integral Coach Factory, Neyveli Lignite Corporation and the Heavy Vehicles Factory. Venkataraman persuaded the TVS Group to set up a factory at Padi and several other private companies including Ashok Leyland, Hindustan Motors and Enfield established their automobile factories in Madras during this time. Tamil Nadu's industrialization has been widely credited to steps initiated during Venkataraman's decade as the state's industries minister and he has been described as the "father of industrialization" in Tamil Nadu.

In 1967, Venkataraman contested the parliamentary election from Thanjavur but lost to the D.S. Gopalar of the Dravida Munnetra Kazhagam. In the assembly election of 1967, the Congress was routed by the Dravida Munnetra Kazhagam. C. N. Annadurai, the DMK's leader in the Council became Chief Minister and Venkataraman the leader of the opposition in the council until his resignation from the Council in August 1967.

Venkataraman was appointed a member of the Planning Commission in July, 1967 by Prime Minister Indira Gandhi and held charge of industry, labour, power, transport, communications and railways. In 1970, the Commission on Major Ports headed by Venkataraman submitted its report to the Government. This was the first study to be made of the integrated function and development of major ports in India. He resigned from the Planning Commission in 1971.

In 1977, Venkataraman was elected to the Lok Sabha from Madras (South) Constituency and served as an Opposition Member of Parliament and Chairman of the Public Accounts Committee.

Venkataraman was also, variously, a member of the Political Affairs Committee and the Economic Affairs Committee of the Union Cabinet; Governor, International Monetary Fund, the International Bank for Reconstruction and Development, and the Asian Development Bank. Venkataraman was a Delegate to the United Nations General Assembly in 1953, 1955, 1956, 1958, 1959, 1960 and 1961. He was Leader of the Indian Delegation to the 42nd Session of the International Labour Conference at Geneva (1958) and represented India in the Inter Parliamentary Conference in Vienna (1978). He was a member of the United Nations Administrative Tribunal from 1955 to 1979 and was its president from 1968 to 1979.

== Union Minister ==
=== Minister of Finance ===
Venkataraman was re-elected to the Lok Sabha from the Madras South constituency in the 1980 general election with an improved majority of over 120,000 votes. He was sworn in as Cabinet Minister in charge of Finance in the Indira Gandhi ministry on 14 January 1980. During January to April, 1980 he was also Minister of Industry. As finance minister, Venkataraman presented the interim and final budgets for 1980 and the budget in 1981. Venkataraman's budget in 1981 was seen as favouring the middle class and industry, focusing on improving growth and savings in the economy while raising customs duty on all imported goods to raise revenue. In the same year, he introduced a bill for the establishment of the National Bank for Agriculture and Rural Development which was passed by Parliament.

When allegations of corruption were raised against the Congress Party and the Chief Minister of Maharashtra, A. R. Antulay regarding the collection of funds by a trust named after Prime Minister Indira Gandhi, she tasked Venkataraman with defending the government in debates on the matter in Parliament. Although members of the opposition attempted to introduce privilege motions against Venkatraman on the grounds that he had misled parliament, these were rejected by the presiding officers in both houses of parliament. In his interventions, Venkataraman sought to dissociate the Prime Minister from the activities of Antulay and he rejected the opposition's demand for a probe arguing that no improprieties had been committed by the trust to warrant an inquiry.

It was during Venkataraman's tenure as finance minister that India negotiated with the International Monetary Fund for a loan for 5 billion special drawing rights amounting to US$5.68 billion. Sanctioned in November 1981, this was the largest loan ever made by the IMF. While the loan required the Indian government to limit the expansion of credit and curtail commercial borrowings and to consult the IMF on fiscal and monetary policies of the government, it did not require India to devalue the rupee as was done in the past.

=== Minister of Defence ===
Venkataraman was shifted from the Ministry of Finance on 15 January 1982 to the Ministry of Defence, a portfolio that had until then been held by Prime Minister Indira Gandhi.

During Venkataraman's tenure in the ministry, the Government of India signed deals to purchase Sea King helicopters and Sea Eagle missiles from the United Kingdom and Mirage fighter aircraft and Type 209 submarines from other western nations thus seeking to undo the near monopoly that the Soviet Union had on weapons systems in the Indian armed forces. In response, the Soviets, keen to not lose out in their largest arms market in the developing world, agreed to India's request for acquiring the MiG-29 fighter jet and to the licensed production in India of the MiG-27 and MiG-29 aircraft during Venkataraman's visit to Moscow in June 1983. The offer was finalized during the visit to India of the Soviet Defence Minister, Dmitry Ustinov in March 1984.

His most consequential contribution as Defence Minister, however, was the launch of the Integrated Guided Missile Development Programme in 1983 which led to the indigenous development of the Prithvi, Akash, Agni, Thrishul and Nag missile systems by India's Defence Research and Development Organisation. Venkataraman's term also witnessed India attempt to conduct a nuclear test in 1983 and the seizing of the Siachen Glacier by the Indian Army in 1984.

Venkataraman demitted office on 2 August 1984 and was succeeded by S. B. Chavan as Minister of Defence.

== Tenure as President & Vice President ==
=== Vice President of India (1984–1987) ===
==== Vice Presidential election ====
Prime Minister Indira Gandhi chose Venkataraman to be the Congress Party's candidate for the vice presidential election to elect a successor to M. Hidayatullah. Bapu Chandrasen Kamble of the Republican Party of India was his sole opponent. In the election held on 22 August 1984, Venkataraman won 508 of 715 valid votes cast to win outright. Venkataraman was sworn in as vice-president on 31 August 1984.

Following Indira Gandhi's assassination, Vice President Venkataraman went along with President Zail Singh's decision to appoint Rajiv Gandhi as prime minister. It was Venkataraman who announced Indira Gandhi's death on Doordarshan and the swearing-in of a new government under Rajiv Gandhi.

As relations between Rajiv Gandhi and President Zail Singh worsened, the Prime Minister stopped calling on the President. The government also began to depute Venkataraman in place of Singh on diplomatic visits. Gandhi however told Parliament that he had been meeting the president regularly and had kept him informed on all matters of policy. A letter contradicting the Prime Minister's statement, allegedly written by President Singh, was leaked to the media which led to a political furore. Venkataraman saved Rajiv Gandhi's government much embarrassment when he declined to allow a discussion in the house on this letter and on the president's right to be kept informed under Article 78 of the Constitution. Despite angry protests and walkouts by opposition parties, Venkataraman refused to budge stating that confidentiality of communications between the president and the prime minister was required to be maintained in the interest of the nation.

As President Singh's term neared its end it was widely speculated that he intended to dismiss Gandhi as prime minister and appoint a caretaker government. Singh asked Venkataraman whether he would be interested in becoming the prime minister in such an eventuality but Venkataraman declined the offer.

In the run up to the presidential election of 1987, the Congress party's initial choices for president were B. Shankaranand, Pupul Jayakar and P.V. Narasimha Rao. However, Venkataraman let it be known that he would resign if he were not nominated as the party's candidate for the presidency. On 14 June 1987 the Congress Parliamentary Board endorsed Venkataraman as the party's nominee for the presidential election. The Left parties fielded Justice V. R. Krishna Iyer as their candidate and despite speculation that he might contest as an independent candidate, President Singh chose to retire.

=== Presidential election ===
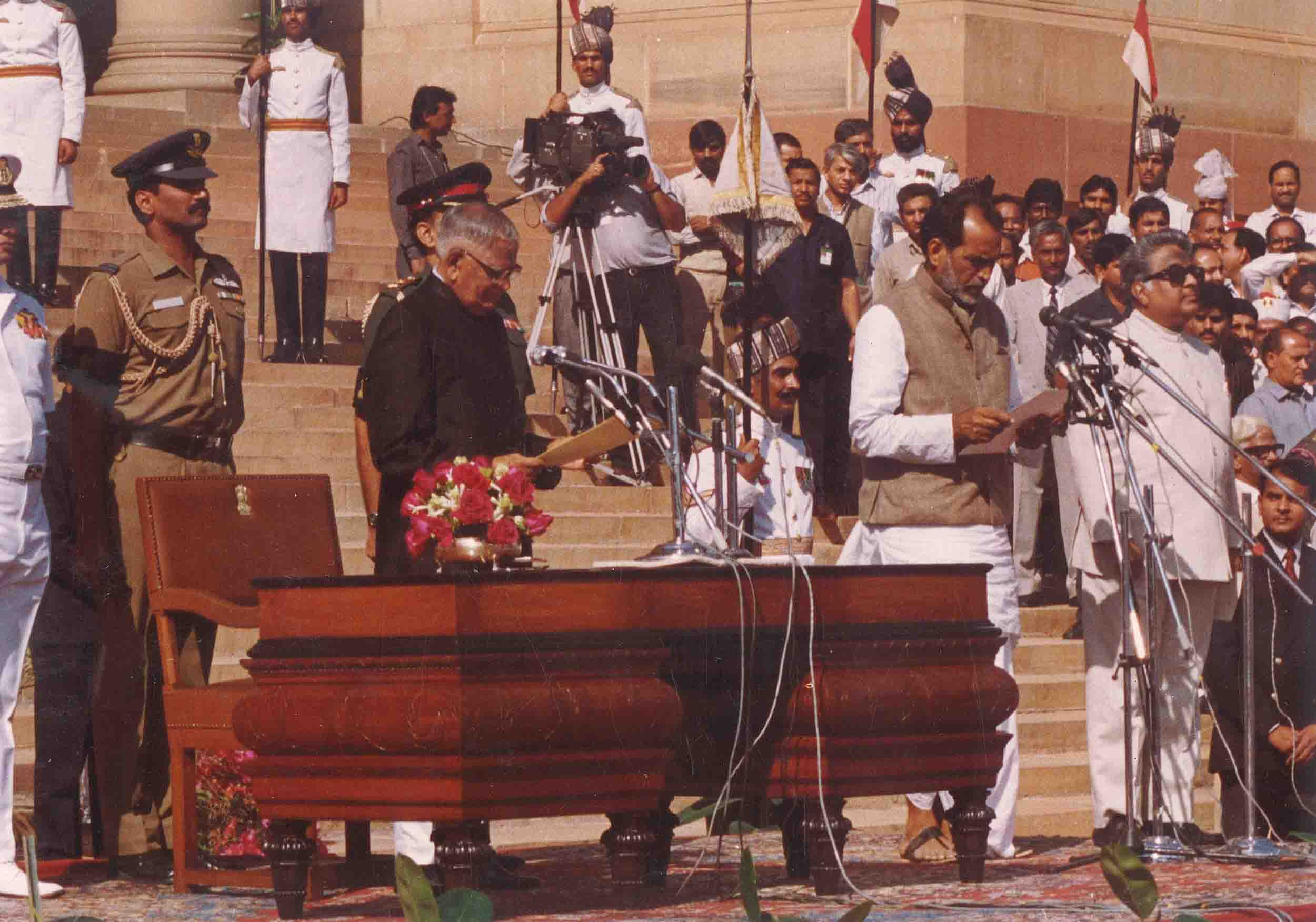
Chandra Shekhar being sworn in as Prime Minister of India. Shekhar was the first prime minister to be administered the oath of office in the forecourt of the Rashtrapati Bhavan.

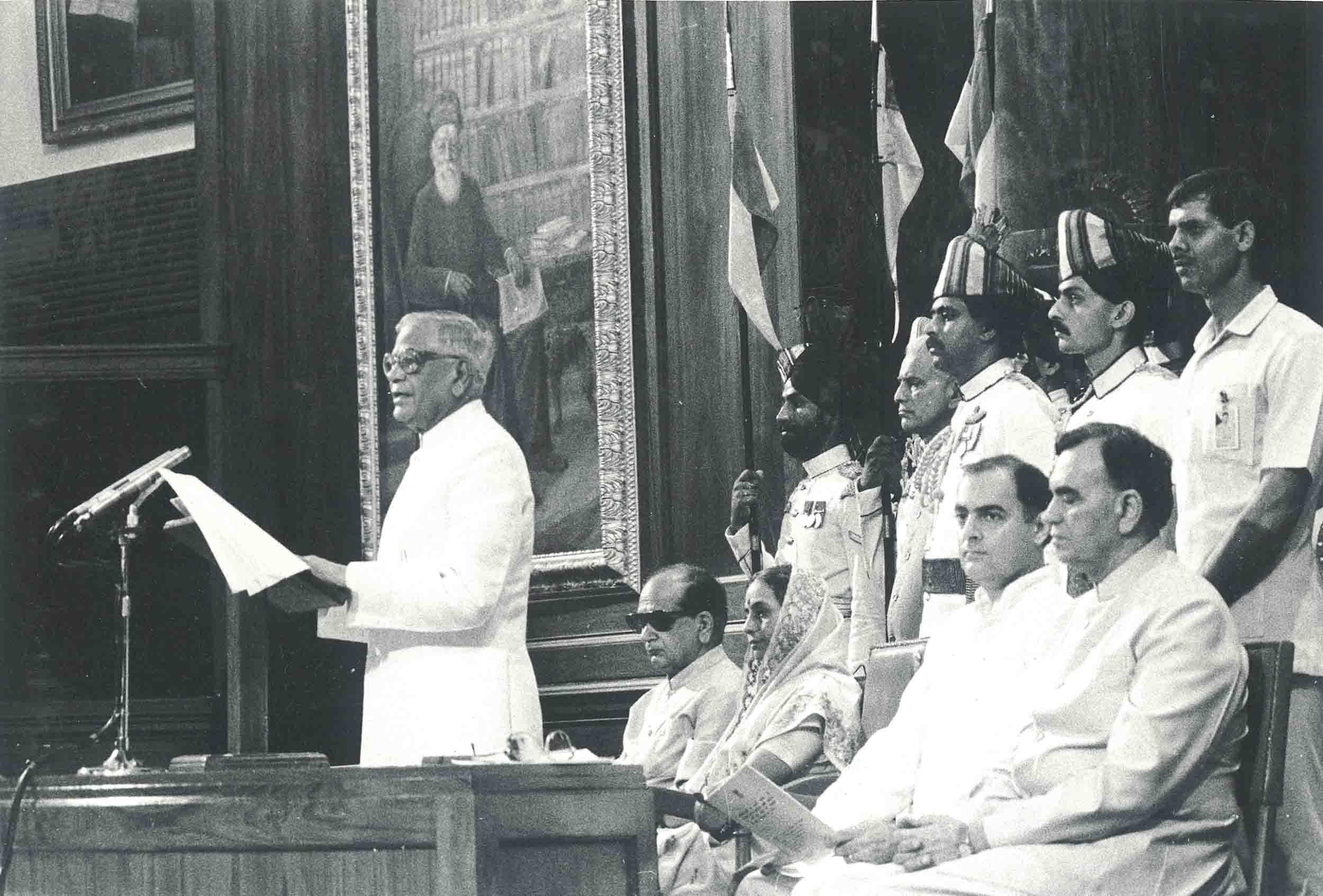
President Venkataraman addressing Parliament on the fortieth anniversary of India's independence.

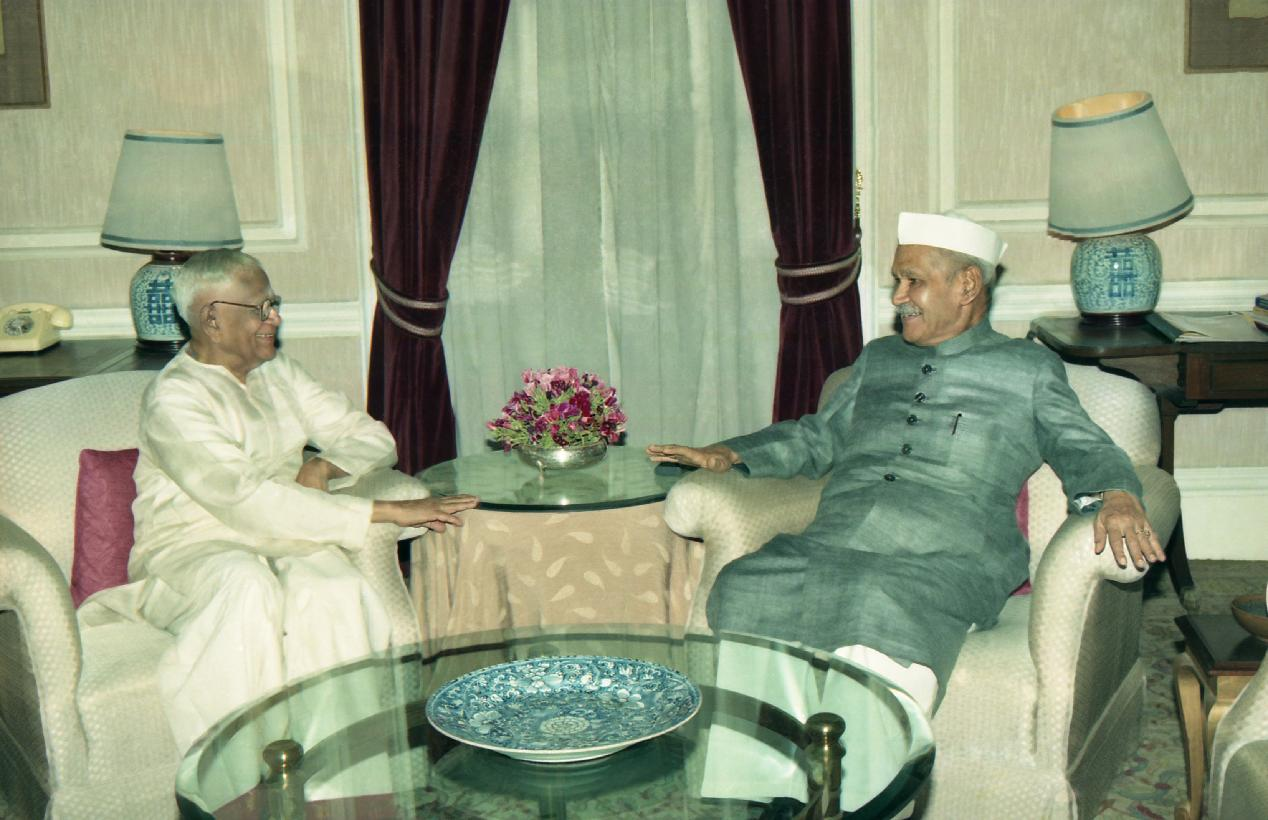
President Shankar Dayal Sharma with R. Venkataraman in May,1995

In the election held in July 1987 Venkataraman emerged victorious winning 740,148 votes against 281,550 votes polled by Krishna Iyer. Mithilesh Kumar came a distant third winning 2,223 votes. Venkatraman won the support of 606 of 755 Members of Parliament and majorities in 14 of 25 state legislative assemblies while Iyer won a majority in 8 legislative assemblies where non-Congress parties held a majority and the support of 139 members of Parliament. Kumar, leader of the Goodmans Party, ended up winning seven votes. Venkataraman was declared elected on 16 July 1987 and was sworn in on 25 July 1987. The election was challenged unsuccessfully in the Supreme Court by Mithilesh Kumar. Coming after a series of electoral defeats, controversies over defence deals and the uneasy relationship between Prime Minister Gandhi and President Zail Singh, the election result was perceived as a boost to the Congress Party.

Venkataraman served as President of India starting 1987, where he worked with four prime ministers, and appointed three of them: V. P. Singh, Chandra Shekhar and P. V. Narasimha Rao, during his five-year term, which saw the advent of coalition politics in India. His successor S. D. Sharma was the only other Indian President in 20th Century to work with four prime ministers and appoint three of them. According to his book My Presidential Years, Venkataraman noted that a Congress MP approached him with the idea of seeking a second term, which he "categorically" declined. Desire for retirement: Venkataraman explained that he did not want to be involved in the political maneuvering necessary for a second term.

== Post-presidency ==
Venkataraman returned to Chennai after retiring, but moved back to Delhi a few years later.

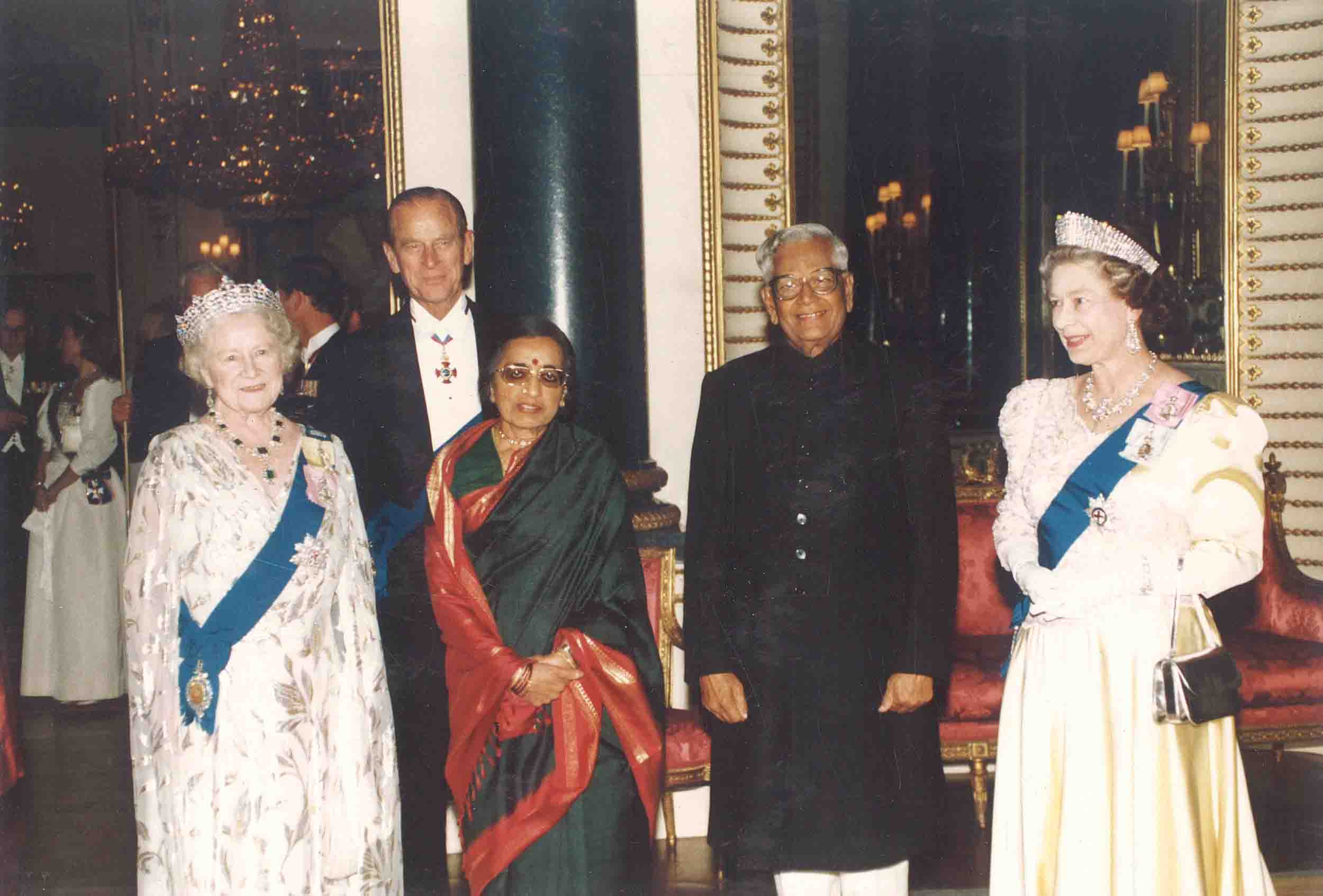
Venkataraman made a state visit to the United Kingdom in 1990. Seen here with Queen Elizabeth The Queen Mother, Prince Philip, Duke of Edinburgh, Janaki Venkataraman and Queen Elizabeth II.

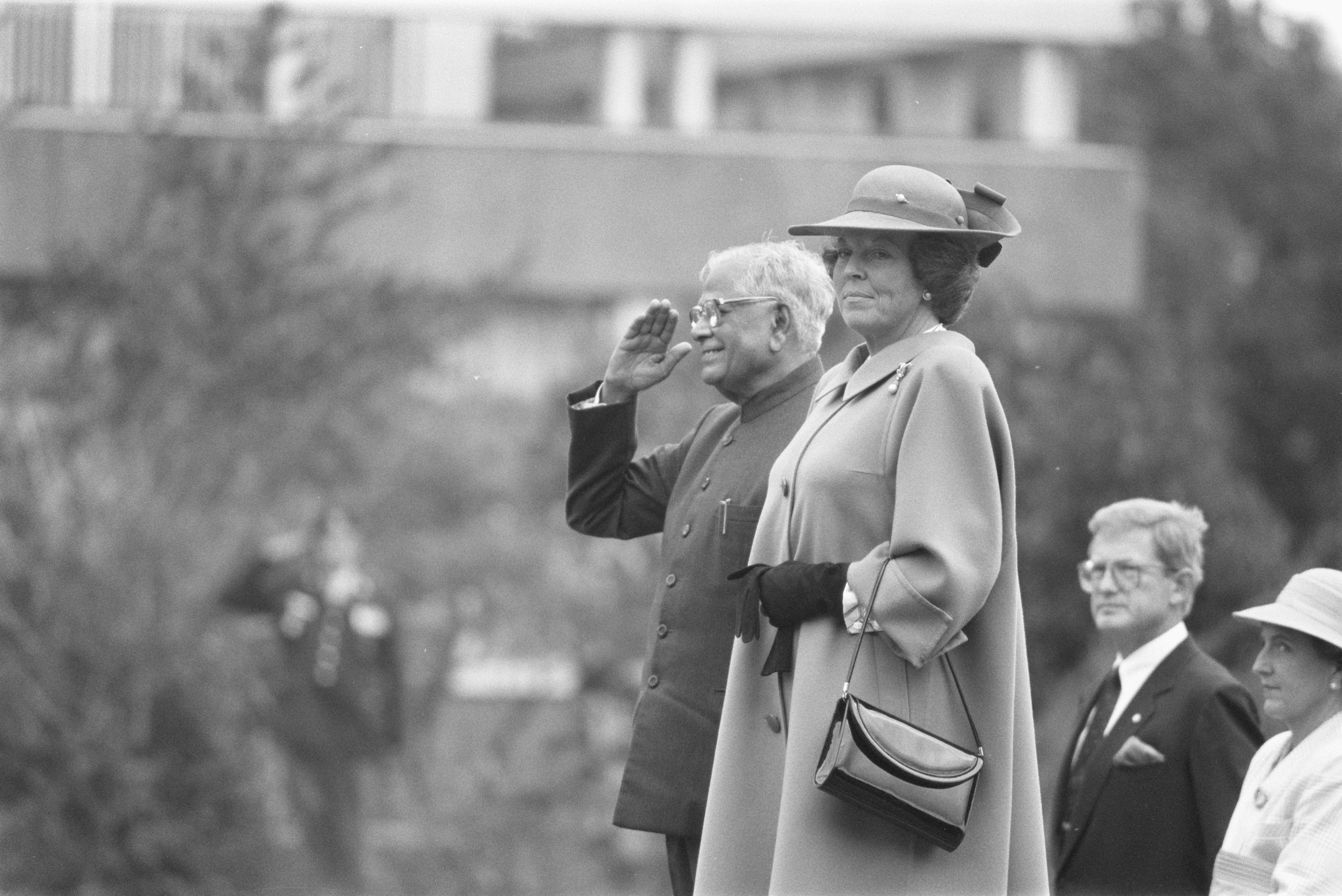
President Venkataraman with Queen Beatrix during his state visit to the Netherlands in 1988.

== Personal life ==
Married to Janaki Venkataraman, he had three daughters.

=== Illness and death ===
On 12 January 2009, Venkataraman was admitted to the Army Hospital (then Research and Referral) in New Delhi with complaints of Urosepsis (sepsis caused by a urinary tract infection). His condition grew critical on 20 January, when he was detected with low blood pressure and E. coli tract infection.

Venkataraman died from multiple organ failure at 14:30 IST on 27 January 2009, at the age of 98. Since he died on the day after Republic Day, some programmes coinciding it were cancelled to mark the respect towards the late former president. He was cremated with full state honours at Ekta Sthal near Raj Ghat. President Pratibha Patil, Vice President Mohammad Hamid Ansari, Prime Minister Manmohan Singh, and various other leaders condoled his death.

== Honours ==
- Venkataraman received the Doctorate of Law (Honoris Causa) from the University of Madras. He is an Honorary Fellow, Madras Medical College;
- Doctor of Social Sciences, University of Roorkee;
- Doctor of Law (Honoris Causa) from the University of Burdwan.
- He was awarded the Tamra Patra for participation in the freedom struggle, the Soviet Land Prize for his travelogue on K. Kamaraj's visit to the Socialist countries.
- He was the recipient of a Souvenir from the Secretary-General of the United Nations for distinguished service as President of the U.N. Administrative Tribunal.
- The title of "Sat Seva Ratna" was conferred on him by the Sankaracharya of Kancheepuram. He was a great devotee of the Paramacharya of Kanchi.

== Books by Venkataraman ==
- Role of Planning in Industrial Development, by Ramaswami Venkataraman. Published by Govt. of India Press, 1969.
- The Role of a Private Member of Parliament, by Ramaswami Venkataraman. Published by Harold Laski Institute of Political Science, 1986.
- My Presidential Years – R Venkataraman, by R Venkataraman. 1995. HarperCollins/Indus. ISBN 81-7223-202-0.
- R. Venkataraman on Contemporary Issues, by Ramaswami Venkataraman, K. Venkatasubramanian. Published by Variant Communications, 1996.
- Relevance of Gandhi: And Other Essays, by K Swaminathan, Ramaswami Venkataraman. Published by Gandhigram Trust, 1998.

== Books on Venkataraman ==
- President R. Venkataraman, by Nand Gopal Chaudhry. Published by Manas Publications, 1987. ISBN 81-7049-018-9.
- The Great Humanist Ramaswami Venkataraman, by Attar Chand. Published by Gian Pub. House, 1987. ISBN 81-212-0106-3.
- So May India be Great: Selected Speeches and Writings of President R. Venkataraman, by Ramaswami Venkataraman. Published by Publication Division, Ministry of Information and Broadcasting, Govt. of India, 1990.
- Selected Speeches, 1984–87, 10 September 1984 – 14 May 1987, by Ramaswami Venkataraman. Published by Publications Division, Ministry of Information and Broadcasting, Govt. of India, 1991.
- President R. Venkataraman Selected Speeches: July 1987 – December 1989., by Ramaswami Venkataraman. Published by Publications Division, Ministry of Information and Broadcasting, Govt. of India, 1991.

Political offices
Preceded by Hemvati Nandan Bahuguna	Minister of Finance; 1980–1982	Succeeded by Pranab Mukherjee
Preceded by Indira Gandhi	Minister of Defence; 1982–1984	Succeeded by Shankarrao Chavan
Preceded by Zail Singh	Minister of Home Affairs; 1982	Succeeded by Prakash Chandra Sethi
Preceded by Mohammad Hidayatullah	Vice-President of India; 1984–1987	Succeeded by Shankar Dayal Sharma
Preceded by Zail Singh	President of India; 1987–1992	Succeeded by Shankar Dayal Sharma
