= B. C. Kamble =

Indian politician

Member of Parliament, Lok Sabha
- In office 1977–1979
- In office 1957–1962

Member of Bombay Legislative Assembly
- In office 1952–1957

Editor of Janata
- In office 1948–1954

Editor of Prabuddha Bharat
- In office 1956–1958

Editor of Republic
- In office 1959–1975

Personal details
- Born: 15 July 1919 Palus, Tasgaon taluka, Sangli District, Maharashtra, India
- Died: 6 November 2006 (aged 87)
- Party: Scheduled Caste Federation; Republican Party of India; Republican Party of India (Kamble)
- Parent: Chandrasen Kamble (father)
- Education: Bachelor of Arts; Bachelor of Laws
- Alma mater: Talak High School, Karad; Fergusson College, Pune
- Profession: Advocate, politician, writer, social worker

Bapu Chandrasen Kamble (15 July 1919 – 6 November 2006) was an Indian politician, writer, editor, jurist, and social activist from Maharashtra. He was also an Ambedkarite thinker, translator and biographer. Kamble was the leader of Republican Party of India (Kamble). He has written a Marathi biography of B. R. Ambedkar called "Samagra Ambedkar Charitra" (Vol. 1–24).

Kamble helped Ambedkar while drafting the Constitution of India. For nearly 50 years after Ambedkar's death, Kamble led the Republican Party of India but there was later a split in the party and he became the president of the Republican Party of India (Kamble) faction.

== Journalism and educational career ==
B. R. Ambedkar started a satyagraha demanding the cancellation of the Poona Pact in Pune on 18 July 1946, because the Cabinet Mission to India rejected the independent political existence of untouchables in 1946. This is called 'Pune Satyagraha'. For support this Satyagraha, student Kamble wrote an article "Dalit Satyagrahinchi Kaifiyat" (Pleading of the Dalit Satyagrahies) in Kirloskar, a leading journal at that time. This article was published in the November 1946 issue of Kirloskar. After that, Ambedkar himself read the article and appointed him as editor of Janata weekly. From 1948 to 1954, Kamble served as the editor of the Janata weekly. From 1956 to 1958, he served as the editor of the Prabuddha Bharata weekly. From 1959 to 1975, he served as the editor of the Republic weekly. The Janata and the Prabuddha Bharat were started by Ambedkar. Kamble was a follower of Ambedkar and due to his influence, converted to Buddhism in 1956. During 1956–57, he served as a Professor of Constitutional Law in Siddharth College of Law, Mumbai.

== Political career ==
In 1952 Bombay Legislative Assembly election, Kamble was the MLA of the Scheduled Caste Federation party in the Bombay Legislative Assembly from 1952 to 1957. During this time, he fought alone on the issue of "Samyukta Maharashtra" (United Maharashtra) in the legislature. He was twice a member of the Republican Party of India in the Lok Sabha from 1957 to 1962 and 1977 to 1979. In the parliament, he opposed the Emergency and 44th Amendment of the constitution. He was a wise and learned leader of the Republican Party of India.

== Books ==
List of following Books written by B. C. Kamble:

- Samagra Ambedkar Charitra (Vol. 1–24)
- Asprushya Mulche Kon Ani Te Asprushya Kase Banale? (Marathi translation of The Untouchables: Who Were They are Why The Become Untouchables)
- Aikyach Ka?
- Dr. Babasaheb Ambedkaranche Akherche Sansadiy Vichar (Last thoughts of Dr. Ambedkar on Parliamentary Affairs)
- Raja Milindche Prashna (Questions of kind Milind)
- Legislature Vs. High Court
- Thoughts on 44th Constitution Amendment Bill
- Dr. Ambedkar on Indian Constitution
- Questions of King Milind
- Tripitak (Volume Nos. 1 to 4)
- Dr. Ambedkar as Parliamentarian
- Last thoughts of Dr. Ambedkar on Parliamentary Affairs
- Uprooting the famine
