= Joginder Singh (politician) =

Indian politician

Kaka Joginder Singh (1918 in Gujranwala – 23 December 1998, in Bareilly) (also known as Dharti Pakar, meaning "one who clings") was a textile owner and perennial candidate who contested and lost over 300 elections in India.

== Early life and career ==
He earned his money through his shop in Bareilly KAKA STORE DHARTIPAKADBareilly. In elections, he always contested as an independent, and always lost.

=== Thoughts on his campaigns ===
Singh looked at the security deposit which he has always lost as his 'humble contribution' to the national fund, and said he never campaigned or used money to earn support. The campaign donations for 1991 were Rs. 2500 and after 1997, the security deposit was raised to Rs. 15000.

His election promises included: repaying all foreign loans, more character building in schools, and bringing back the barter system as a panacea for the Indian economy.

=== Earning of "Dharti Pakar" ===
His nomination papers were usually disregarded by the election commission and he earned the nickname Dharti Pakar (one who clings) after several unsuccessful runs for the President of India. The most prolific year for him was during the 1992 10th Presidential elections where he earned fourth place in the polling with 1135 votes, losing to Shankar Dayal Sharma. He also contested elections from 14 states of India in the 1990s, mostly for state assemblies. In 1992 he contested against K.R. Narayanan for Vice-President of India and secured 1 vote.

== Election efforts ==
- He earned 451 votes (0.23%) in the Ludhiana poll for 1982
- He earned 1848 votes (0.33%) in the Ludhiana poll for 1985
- He earned 46 votes in the 1991 New Delhi elections
- He was fourth in the polling for the Nandyal Lok Sabha election of 1991 with 1506 votes (.001%)
- He was fourth in the polling for president in 1991
- He was eighth place in the polling for the Lucknow Lok Sabha elections of 1998, with 212 votes (0.02%)

== Death ==
Singh died on 23 December 1998. Earlier in the year, he tried to contest elections against BJP leaders Atal Bihari Vajpayee and L. K. Advani.

== See also ==
- Hotte Paksha Rangaswamy
- K. Padmarajan
