= Bhopal Lok Sabha constituency =

Lok Sabha constituency in Madhya Pradesh

Coordinates: 23.2667°N 77.4°E

Bhopal
- Lok Sabha constituency
- Interactive Map Outlining Bhopal Lok Sabha constituency

Constituency details
- Country: India
- Region: Central India
- State: Madhya Pradesh
- Assembly constituencies: Berasia; Bhopal Uttar; Narela; Bhopal Dakshin-Paschim; Bhopal Madhya; Govindpura; Huzur; Sehore
- Established: 1952
- Total electors: 23,39,411
- Reservation: None

Member of Parliament
- 18th Lok Sabha
- Incumbent Alok Sharma
- Party: Bharatiya Janata Party
- Elected year: 2024

Bhopal is one of the 29 Lok Sabha constituencies in Madhya Pradesh state in central India. This constituency presently covers the entire Bhopal district and part of Sehore district.

== Assembly Segments ==
Like most other Lok Sabha seats in MP and Chhattisgarh, with few seats like Durg (which has nine assembly segments under it) being exceptions, Bhopal Lok Sabha seat has 8 assembly seats as its segments.

#	Name	District	Member	Party	2024 Lead
149	Berasia (SC)	Bhopal	Vishnu Khatri	BJP	BJP
150	Bhopal Uttar	Bhopal	Atif Arif Aqueel	INC	INC
151	Narela	Bhopal	Vishvas Sarang	BJP	BJP
152	Bhopal Dakshin-Paschim	Bhopal	Bhagwandas Sabnani	BJP	BJP
153	Bhopal Madhya	Bhopal	Arif Masood	INC	INC
154	Govindpura	Bhopal	Krishna Gaur	BJP	BJP
155	Huzur	Bhopal	Rameshwar Sharma	BJP	BJP
159	Sehore	Sehore	Sudesh Rai	BJP	BJP

== Members of Parliament ==
Year	Member	Party
1952	Saidullah Razmi	Indian National Congress
1952	Chatur Narain Malviya	Indian National Congress
1957	Maimoona Sultan	Indian National Congress
1962	Maimoona Sultan	Indian National Congress
1967	Jagannathrao Joshi	Bharatiya Jana Sangh
1971	Shankar Dayal Sharma	Indian National Congress
1977	Arif Beg	Janata Party
1980	Shankar Dayal Sharma	Indian National Congress (I)
1984	K. N. Pradhan	Indian National Congress
1989	Sushil Chandra Varma	Bharatiya Janata Party
1991	Sushil Chandra Varma	Bharatiya Janata Party
1996	Sushil Chandra Varma	Bharatiya Janata Party
1998	Sushil Chandra Varma	Bharatiya Janata Party
1999	Uma Bharti	Bharatiya Janata Party
2004	Kailash Joshi	Bharatiya Janata Party
2009	Kailash Joshi	Bharatiya Janata Party
2014	Alok Sanjar	Bharatiya Janata Party
2019	Pragya Thakur	Bharatiya Janata Party
2024	Alok Sharma	Bharatiya Janata Party

== Election results ==
Vote share of Winning candidates
2024	65.48%
2019	61.54%
2014	63.19%
2009	50.95%
2004	65.41%
1999	55.09%
1998	57.44%
1996	49.27%
1991	53.61%
1989	46.48%
1984	61.73%
1980	43.53%
1977	63.35%
1971	50.88%
1967	48.81%
1962	36.61%
1957	41.25%
1952 (Sehore)	50.66%
1952 (Raisen)	66.02%

=== 2024 ===
2024 Indian general election: Bhopal
Party	Candidate	Votes	%	±%
BJP	Alok Sharma	981,109	65.48	
INC	Advocate Arun Shrivastava	479,610	32.01	
BSP	Bhanu Pratap Singh	13,305	0.89	
NOTA	None of the Above	6,621	0.44	
IND	9 Independent Candidates	11,591	0.77	
OTH	10 Other Party Candidates	6,049	0.40	
Majority		501,499	33.47	
Turnout		14,98,285	64.06	
BJP hold		Swing		

=== 2019 ===
2019 Indian general election: Bhopal
Party	Candidate	Votes	%	±%
BJP	Sadhvi Pragya Singh Thakur	866,482	61.54	
INC	Digvijaya Singh	501,660	35.63	
BSP	Madho Singh Ahirwar	11,277	0.80	
NOTA	None of the Above	5,430	0.39	
IND	16 Independent Candidates	17,467	1.24	
OTH	11 Other Party Candidates	5,638	0.40	
Majority		364,822	25.91	
Turnout		14,08,669	65.74	
BJP hold		Swing		

=== 2014 ===
2014 Indian general election: Bhopal
Party	Candidate	Votes	%	±%
BJP	Alok Sanjar	714,178	63.19	
INC	P. C. Sharma	343,482	30.39	
AAP	Rachna Dhingra	21,298	1.88	
BSP	Sunil Borse	10,152	0.90	
CPI	Shailendra Kumar Shaili	7,643	0.68	
SP	Sheeba Malik	5,742	0.51	
SDPI	Master Sajid Siddiqui	5,557	0.49	
NOTA	None of the Above	5,181	0.46	
IND	11 Independent Candidates	8,985	0.80	
OTH	10 Other Party Candidates	7,964	0.70	
Majority		370,696	32.80	
Turnout		11,30,182	57.75	
BJP hold		Swing	+12.24	

=== 2009 ===
2009 Indian general election: Bhopal
Party	Candidate	Votes	%	±%
BJP	Kailash Joshi	335,678	50.95	
INC	Surendra Singh Thakur	270,521	41.06	
BSP	Er. Ashok Narayan Singh	18,649	2.83	
SP	Mhod. Munawar Khan Kausar	8,615	1.31	
IND	13 Independent Candidates	19,796	2.99	
OTH	6 Other Party Candidates	5,581	0.83	
Majority		65,157	9.89	
Turnout		658,840	45.07	
BJP hold		Swing		

=== 2004 ===
2004 Indian general election: Bhopal
Party	Candidate	Votes	%	±%
BJP	Kailash Joshi	561,563	65.41	
INC	Sajid Ali	255,558	29.77	
BSP	G. S. Chawala	16,712	1.95	
IND	2 Independent Candidates	10,419	1.21	
OTH	5 Other Party Candidates	14,211	1.66	
Majority		306,005	35.64	
Turnout		858,463	46.47	
BJP hold		Swing		

=== 1999 ===
1999 Indian general election: Bhopal
Party	Candidate	Votes	%	±%
BJP	Uma Bharti	537,905	55.09	
INC	Suresh Pachori	369,041	37.79	
IND	Shrawan Gourav	19,710	2.02	
BSP	Phool Singh	18,617	1.91	
NCP	Aslam Sher Khan	6,044	0.62	
JD(S)	M. W. Siddiqui	5,392	0.55	
IND	5 Independent Candidates	13,530	1.40	
OTH	4 Other Party Candidates	6,254	0.64	
Majority		168,864	17.30	
Turnout		976,686	61.88	
BJP hold		Swing		

=== 1998 ===
1998 Indian general election: Bhopal
Party	Candidate	Votes	%	±%
BJP	Dr. Sushil Chandra Varma	4,94,481	57.44	
INC	Arif Baig	3,00,549	34.91	
BSP	Manoj Shrivastava	54,526	4.01	
CPI	Shailendra Kumar	15,423	1.79	
Majority		1,93,932	22.53	
Turnout		8,60,917	58.03	
BJP hold		Swing		

=== 1996 ===
1996 Indian general election: Bhopal
Party	Candidate	Votes	%	±%
BJP	Dr. Sushil Chandra Varma	3,53,427	49.27	
INC	Kailash Agnihotri	2,02,533	28.24	
Independent	Ramesh Saxena	52,865	7.37	
AIIC(T)	Lalit Srivastava	46,146	6.43	
Independent	Rafiq Aslam Qureshi	8,605	1.20	
Majority		1,50,894	21.03	
Turnout		7,17,295	49.26	
BJP hold		Swing		

=== 1991 ===
1991 Indian general election: Bhopal
Party	Candidate	Votes	%	±%
BJP	Dr. Sushil Chandra Varma	3,08,946	53.61	
INC	Mansoor Ali Khan Pataudi	2,06,738	35.88	
JD	Swami Agniwesh	26,716	4.64	
Majority		1,02,208	17.73	
Turnout		5,76,232	49.67	
BJP hold		Swing		

=== 1989 ===
1989 Indian general election: Bhopal
Party	Candidate	Votes	%	±%
BJP	Dr. Sushil Chandra Varma	2,81,169	46.48	
INC	K. N. Pradhan	1,77,515	29.35	
BSP	A. Rauf Khan	97,886	16.18	
Majority		1,03,654	17.13	
Turnout		6,04,911	53.97	
BJP gain from INC		Swing		

=== 1984 ===
1984 Indian general election: Bhopal
Party	Candidate	Votes	%	±%
INC	K. N. Pradhan	2,40,717	61.73	
BJP	Laxminarayan Sharma	1,12,053	28.74	
JP	Goswami Gajanan Puri	5,705	1.46	
Independent	Gulkhan Alam	4,710	1.21	
Independent	Shiv Kumar Sahni	4,386	1.12	
Majority		1,28,664	32.99	
Turnout		3,89,943	48.89	
INC hold		Swing		

=== 1980 ===
1980 Indian general election: Bhopal
Party	Candidate	Votes	%	±%
INC(I)	Shankardayal Sharma	168,059	43.53	
JP	Arif Beg	154,457	40.01	
CPI	Homi Daji	24,370	6.31	
IND	Bhaiyalal Shobharam	8,331	2.16	
IND	Washiuddin Khan	5,913	1.53	
IND	Narayandas Khambhra	4,687	1.21	
IND	Vidya Jain	3,842	1.00	
IND	Babulal Sangode	3,588	0.93	
IND	K. C. Gupta	3,391	0.88	
IND	Ramkumar Khare	3,257	0.84	
IND	Shafic Siddiqui	3,162	0.82	
IND	Radheshyam Agrawal	2,995	0.78	
Majority		13,602	3.52	
Turnout		397,589	56.70	
Swing to INC(I) from JP		Swing		

=== 1977 ===
1977 Indian general election: Bhopal
Party	Candidate	Votes	%	±%
JP	Arif Beg	231,023	63.35	
INC	Shankar Dayal Sharma	122,497	33.59	
IND	Babulal Sangode	11,163	3.06	
Majority		108,526	29.76	
Turnout		381,028	61.76	
Swing to JP from INC		Swing		

=== 1971 ===
1971 Indian general election: Bhopal
Party	Candidate	Votes	%	±%
INC	Shankar Dayal Sharma	158,805	50.88	
ABJS	Bhanu Prakash Singh	127,393	40.81	
IND	Dada Bhoumick	20,342	6.52	
SSP	Arif Beg Karamat Beg	5,601	1.79	
Majority		31,412	10.07	
Turnout		326,690	56.18	
Swing to INC from ABJS		Swing		

=== 1967 ===
1967 Indian general election: Bhopal
Party	Candidate	Votes	%	±%
ABJS	J. R. Joshi	138,698	48.81	
INC	M. Sultan	94,767	33.35	
CPI	M. D. Shrivastava	35,274	12.41	
IND	A. A. Khan	8,807	3.10	
IND	H. B. Bhide	6,588	2.32	
Majority		43,931	15.46	
Turnout		295,340	55.88	
Swing to ABJS from INC		Swing		

=== 1962 ===
1962 Indian general election: Bhopal
Party	Candidate	Votes	%	±%
INC	Maimoona Sultan	83,204	36.61	
HM	Om Parkash	63,898	28.11	
ABJS	Mahipal	38,211	16.81	
CPI	Mohini	34,010	14.96	
IND	Shiv Charan	7,969	3.51	
Majority		19,306	8.50	
Turnout		236,088	46.52	
INC hold		Swing		

=== 1957 ===
1957 Indian general election: Bhopal
Party	Candidate	Votes	%	±%
INC	Maimoona Sultan	81,134	41.25	
HM	Hardayal Deogan	55,950	28.44	
CPI	Mohini Devi	31,424	15.98	
IND	Anoopbai	15,207	7.73	
IND	Ram Charan Rai	12,983	6.60	
IND	Gulab Chand	0	0.00	
Majority		25,184	12.81	
Turnout		196,698	46.00	
INC hold		Swing		

=== 1952 (Sehore) ===
1952 Indian general election: Sehore
Party	Candidate	Votes	%	±%
INC	Saeed Ullah Razmi	48,107	50.66	
HM	Udhav Das	34,712	36.56	
KMPP	Ratankumar	8,808	9.28	
Socialist	Govindprasad Aftab Raizada	3,329	3.51	
Majority		13,395	14.10	
Turnout		94,956	41.02	
INC win (new seat)				

=== 1952 (Raisen) ===
1952 Indian general election: Raisen
Party	Candidate	Votes	%	±%
INC	Chatrunarain Malvia	49,185	66.02	
IND	Thakur Shankar Singh	25,316	33.98	
Majority		23,869	32.04	
Turnout		74,501	39.52	
INC win (new seat)				

== See also ==
- Bhopal district
- List of constituencies of the Lok Sabha
