= Bhopal Legislative Assembly =

Unicameral state legislature ofBhopal in India

Type
- Type: Unicameral
- Term limits: 5 years

Leadership
- Leader of the House (Chief Minister): Shankar Dayal Sharma, INC

Structure
- Seats: 30
- Political groups: Government (25): INC (25); Opposition: ABHM (1); Independent politician (4)

Elections
- Voting system: First past the post

Meeting place
- Bhopal, Bhopal State, India

The Bhopal Vidhan Sabha or the Bhopal Legislative Assembly was the unicameral state legislature of Bhopal state in India.

The seat of the Vidhan Sabha was at Bhopal, the capital of the state.

== History ==
The history of the Bhopal legislature can be traced back to 1951, when the Parliament of India past a low to create a Legislative Assembly to same part C stats, Bhopal included.

The only election to Bhopal Legislative Assembly were held on March 27, 1952. The state was divided in to 30 constituencies, seven two-member constituencies and sixteen single-member constituencies. the Indian National Congress wan 25 out of 30 seats.

The Assembly was merged with the Madhya Pradesh Legislative Assembly on 1 November 1956, following the merging of the state of Bhopal with Madhya Pradesh, under the States Reorganisation Act, 1956. The tenure of this first Vidhan Sabha was very short, and it was dissolved on 5 March 1957.

== Members of Legislative Assembly ==
#	Constituency	Member	Party
1	Shahajahanabad	Jalauddin Qureshi	Indian National Congress
2	Shishmahal	Syed Ajazuddin	Indian National Congress
3	Jahangirabad	Inayatullah Tarzi Mashriqui	Indian National Congress
4	Bairagarh	Baboolal Bhartia	Indian National Congress
4	Bairagarh	Lila Rai	Indian National Congress
5	Huzur	Sardarmal Lalwani	Independent
6	Berasia	Shankar Dayal Sharma	Indian National Congress
7	Nazirabad	Shankar Dayal	Hindu Mahasabha
8	Sehore	Umrao Singh	Indian National Congress
8	Sehore	Sultan Mohd Khan	Indian National Congress
9	Shyampur	Har Kishan Singh	Indian National Congress
9	Shyampur	Baboolal	Indian National Congress
10	Ashta	Chandan Mal	Indian National Congress
10	Ashta	Gopi Das	Indian National Congress
11	Kotri	Maimoona Sultana	Indian National Congress
12	Ichhawar	Kesarimal Jain	Indian National Congress
13	Nasrullahganj	Vanshi Dhar	Indian National Congress
14	Budhni	Lachmi Narain	Indian National Congress
15	Raisen	Baboolal	Indian National Congress
15	Raisen	Kamta Prashad	Indian National Congress
16	Begumganj	Kundan Lal	Indian National Congress
17	Sultanganj	Baboolal Kamal	Indian National Congress
18	Goharganj	Dalip Singh	Independent
18	Goharganj	Gulab Chand	Independent
19	Amrawad	Narbada Charan Lal	Indian National Congress
20	Bareli	Shyam Sundar	Indian National Congress
21	Silwani	Lila Dhar Rathi	Indian National Congress
21	Silwani	Daulat Shah	Independent
22	Udaipur	Nit Gopal	Indian National Congress
23	Deori	Ram Karan Lal	Indian National Congress
