= 1951–52 Indian general election =

- 25 October 1951 – 21 February 1952

489 of the 499 seats in the Lok Sabha (Note: Ten members were appointed, including six representing Jammu and Kashmir, two representing Anglo-Indians, one representing Part B tribal areas in Assam and one representing the Andaman and Nicobar Islands) 245 seats needed for a majority
- Registered: 173,212,343
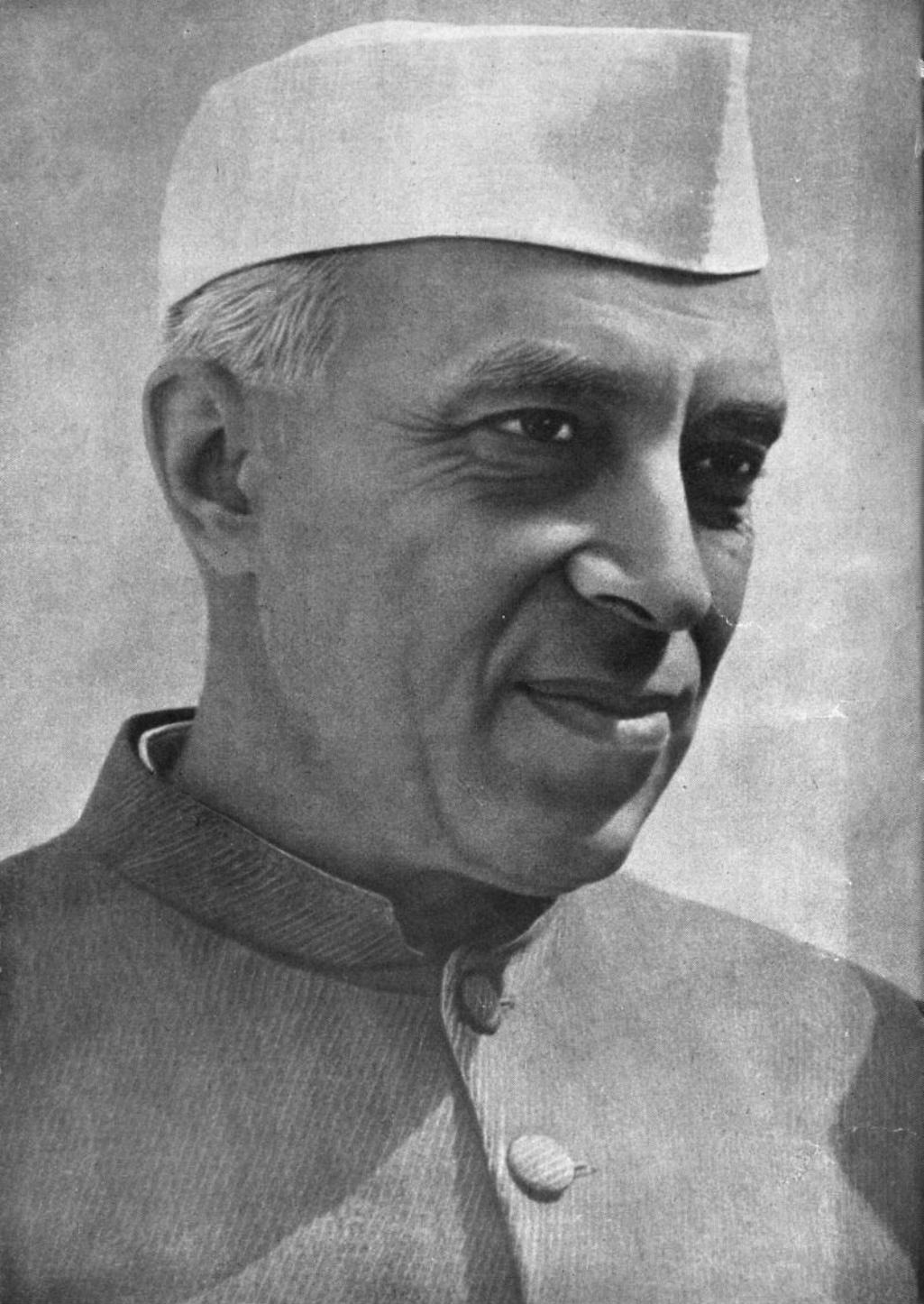

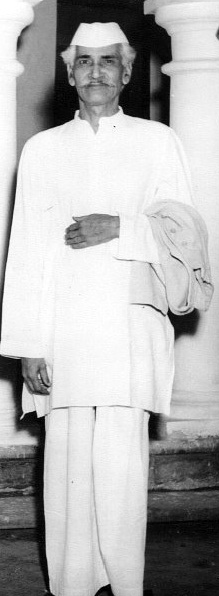

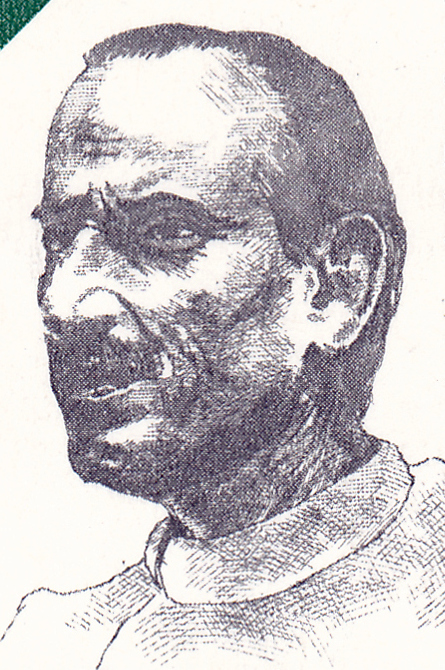
| | First party | Second party |
|---|---|---|
| | | CPI |
| Leader | Jawaharlal Nehru | Ajoy Ghosh |
| Party | INC | CPI |
| Seats won | 364 | 16 |
| Popular vote | 47,665,951 | 3,487,401 |
| Percentage | 44.99% | 3.29% |
| | Third party | Fourth party |
| Leader | Narendra Deva | J. B. Kripalani |
| Party | Socialist | KMPP |
| Seats won | 12 | 9 |
| Popular vote | 11,216,719 | 6,135,978 |
| Percentage | 10.59% | 5.79% |
Prime Minister before election
Jawaharlal Nehru
INC
Prime Minister after election
Jawaharlal Nehru
INC

General elections were held in India between 25 October 1951 and 21 February 1952, the first national elections after India gained independence in 1947. Voters elected 489 members of the first Lok Sabha, the lower house of the Parliament of India. Elections to most of the state legislatures were held simultaneously. It was the first Indian election with full universal franchise.

The elections were conducted under the provisions of the constitution adopted on 26 November 1949. After the adoption of the constitution, the Constituent Assembly continued to act as the interim parliament, while an interim cabinet was headed by Jawaharlal Nehru. An Election Commission was created in 1949 and in March 1950 Sukumar Sen was appointed as the first Chief Election Commissioner. A month later parliament passed the Representation of the People Act which set out how the elections for parliament and state legislatures would be conducted. The 489 elected seats of the Lok Sabha were allotted across 401 constituencies in 25 states. There were 314 constituencies electing one member using the first-past-the-post system. 86 constituencies elected two members, one from the general category and one from Scheduled Castes or Scheduled Tribes. There was one constituency with three elected representatives. The multi-seat constituencies were created as reserved seats for backward sections of society, and were abolished in the 1960s. The constitution at this time also provided for two Anglo-Indian members to be nominated by the President of India.

A total of 1,949 candidates competed for 489 elected seats in the Lok Sabha. Each candidate was allotted a different coloured ballot box at the polling booth, on which the candidate's name and symbol were written. 16,500 clerks were appointed on a contract of six months to type and collate the electorate rolls and 380,000 reams of paper were used for printing the rolls. A total of 173,212,343 voters were registered (excluding Jammu and Kashmir) out of a population of 361,088,090 according to the 1951 census, making it the largest election conducted at the time. All Indian citizens over the age of 21 were eligible to vote.

Due to the harsh climate and challenging logistics, the election was held in 68 phases. A total of 196,084 polling booths were set up, of which 27,527 booths were reserved for women. The majority of voting took place in early 1952, but Himachal Pradesh voted in 1951 as its weather was commonly inclement in February and March, with heavy snow impending free movement. The remainder of states voted in February–March 1952, except for Jammu & Kashmir, where no voting took place for Lok Sabha seats until 1967. The first votes of the election were cast in the tehsil (district) of Chini in Himachal Pradesh.

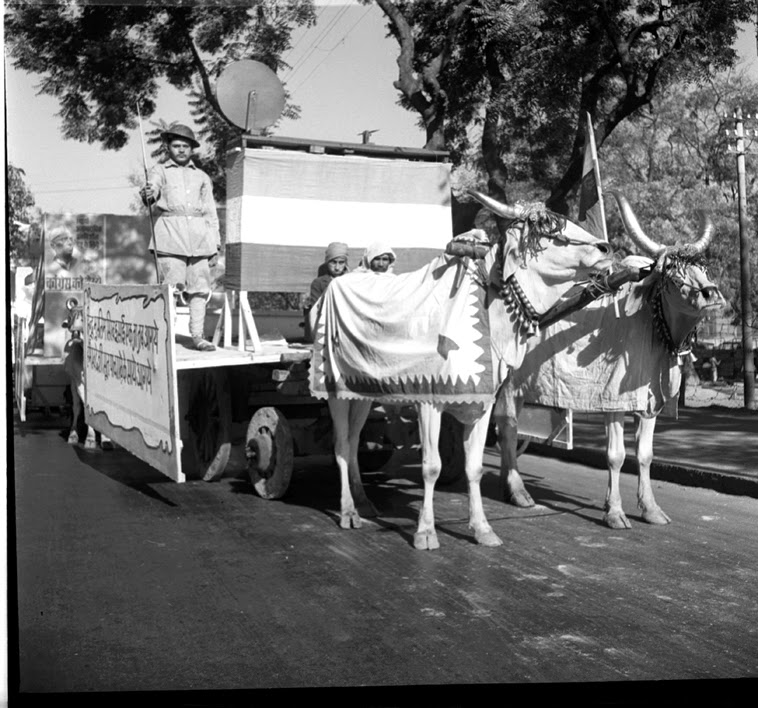
A Congress procession including bullocks and a flag - a pair of bullocks was the election symbol of the Congress Party in 1952

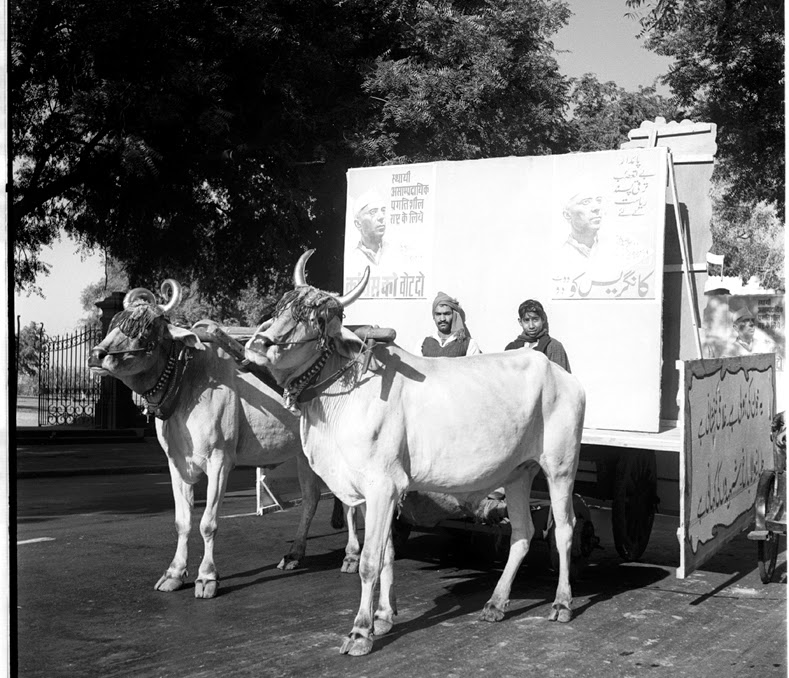
A front view of Congress Party election procession featuring a pair of bullocks - the symbol of the Congress Party in 1952

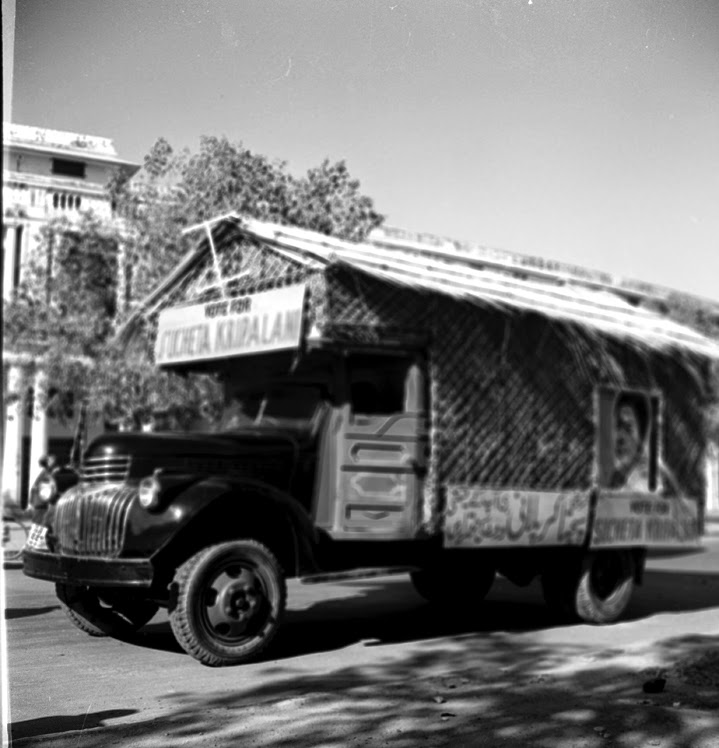
A truck fitted with the model of a Hut in 1952, the election symbol of the Kisan Mazdoor Praja Party

The result was a landslide victory for the Indian National Congress (INC), which received 45% of the vote and won 364 of the 489 elected seats. The second-placed Socialist Party received only 11% of the vote and won twelve seats. Jawaharlal Nehru became the first democratically elected Prime Minister of the country.

== Contesting parties ==
A total of 53 parties and 533 independents contested the 489 seats.

Several ministers resigned from their posts and formed their own parties to contest the elections. Syama Prasad Mukherjee established the Jana Sangh in October 1951 and Law Minister B. R. Ambedkar revived the Scheduled Castes Federation (which was later named the Republican Party). Congress party president Purushottam Das Tandon resigned from his post because of differences with Nehru.

== Results ==
| Party | Votes | % | Seats |
|---|---|---|---|
| Indian National Congress | 47,665,951 | 44.99 | 364 |
| Socialist Party | 11,216,719 | 10.59 | 12 |
| Kisan Mazdoor Praja Party | 6,135,978 | 5.79 | 9 |
| Communist Party of India | 3,487,401 | 3.29 | 16 |
| Bharatiya Jana Sangh | 3,246,361 | 3.06 | 3 |
| Scheduled Castes Federation | 2,521,695 | 2.38 | 2 |
| Akhil Bharatiya Ram Rajya Parishad | 2,091,898 | 1.97 | 3 |
| Krishikar Lok Party | 1,489,615 | 1.41 | 1 |
| People's Democratic Front | 1,367,404 | 1.29 | 7 |
| Shiromani Akali Dal | 1,047,611 | 0.99 | 4 |
| Hindu Mahasabha | 1,003,034 | 0.95 | 4 |
| Peasants and Workers Party of India | 992,187 | 0.94 | 2 |
| Forward Bloc (Marxist) | 963,058 | 0.91 | 1 |
| All India Ganatantra Parishad | 959,749 | 0.91 | 6 |
| Tamil Nadu Toilers' Party | 889,292 | 0.84 | 4 |
| Jharkhand Party | 749,702 | 0.71 | 3 |
| Revolutionary Socialist Party | 468,108 | 0.44 | 3 |
| Commonweal Party | 325,398 | 0.31 | 3 |
| Lok Sewak Sangh | 309,940 | 0.29 | 2 |
| Zamindar Party | 291,300 | 0.27 | 0 |
| Chota Nagpur Santhal Parganas Janata Party | 236,094 | 0.22 | 1 |
| Uttar Pradesh Praja Party | 213,656 | 0.20 | 0 |
| S.K. Paksha | 137,343 | 0.13 | 0 |
| All India Forward Bloc (Ruikar) | 133,936 | 0.13 | 0 |
| Kamgar Kisan Paksha | 132,574 | 0.13 | 0 |
| Tribal Sangha | 116,629 | 0.11 | 0 |
| Travancore Tamil Nadu Congress | 115,893 | 0.11 | 1 |
| Kerala Socialist Party | 102,098 | 0.10 | 0 |
| Indian Union Muslim League | 79,470 | 0.08 | 1 |
| Revolutionary Communist Party of India | 67,275 | 0.06 | 0 |
| Justice Party | 63,254 | 0.06 | 0 |
| All India United Kisan Sabha | 60,254 | 0.06 | 0 |
| All India Republican Party (RPP) | 57,815 | 0.05 | 0 |
| All India Republican Party (REP) | 44,286 | 0.04 | 0 |
| All People's Party | 36,851 | 0.03 | 0 |
| Tamil Nadu Congress Party | 36,158 | 0.03 | 0 |
| Khasi-Jaintia Durbar | 32,987 | 0.03 | 0 |
| Saurashtra Khedut Sangh | 29,766 | 0.03 | 0 |
| Bolshevik Party of India | 25,792 | 0.02 | 0 |
| All Manipur National Union | 22,083 | 0.02 | 0 |
| Uttar Pradesh Revolutionary Socialist Party | 20,665 | 0.02 | 0 |
| Hill People Party | 17,350 | 0.02 | 0 |
| Praja Party | 16,955 | 0.02 | 0 |
| Kuki National Association | 12,155 | 0.01 | 0 |
| Punjab Depressed Class League | 11,789 | 0.01 | 0 |
| Pursharathi Panchayat | 10,778 | 0.01 | 0 |
| Cochin Party | 8,947 | 0.01 | 0 |
| Kisan Mazdoor Mandal | 8,808 | 0.01 | 0 |
| Hyderabad State Praja Party | 7,646 | 0.01 | 0 |
| Gandhi Sebak Seva | 7,196 | 0.01 | 0 |
| Kisan Janta Sanyukta Party | 6,390 | 0.01 | 0 |
| National Party of India | 3,232 | 0.00 | 0 |
| Historical Research | 1,468 | 0.00 | 0 |
| Independents | 16,850,089 | 15.90 | 37 |
| Appointed members (Note: Six representing Jammu and Kashmir, two representing Anglo-Indians, one representing Part B tribal areas in Assam and one representing the Andaman and Nicobar Islands.) | | | 10 |
| Total | 105,950,083 | 100.00 | 499 |
| Registered voters/turnout | 173,212,343 | – | |
Source: ECI

=== Results by state ===
| State | Total seats | Seats won | | | | | | | | | | | | |
| State | Total seats | INC | CPI | SPI | KMPP | PDF | GP | BJS | RRP | SCF | KLP | Others | Ind. | App. |
|---|---|---|---|---|---|---|---|---|---|---|---|---|---|---|
| Andaman and Nicobar Islands | 1 | | | | | | | | | | | | | 1 |
| Assam | 13 | 11 | | 1 | | | | | | | | | | 1 |
| Ajmer | 2 | 2 | | | | | | | | | | | | |
| Bhopal | 2 | 2 | | | | | | | | | | | | |
| Bihar | 55 | 45 | | 3 | | | | | | | | 6 | 1 | |
| Bilaspur | 1 | | | | | | | | | | | | 1 | |
| Bombay | 45 | 40 | | | | | | | | 1 | | 1 | 3 | |
| Coorg | 1 | 1 | | | | | | | | | | | | |
| Delhi | 4 | 3 | | | 1 | | | | | | | | | |
| Himachal Pradesh | 3 | 3 | | | | | | | | | | | | |
| Hyderabad | 25 | 14 | | 1 | | 7 | | | | 1 | | 1 | 1 | |
| Jammu and Kashmir | 6 | | | | | | | | | | | | | 6 |
| Kutch | 2 | 2 | | | | | | | | | | | | |
| Madhya Bharat | 11 | 9 | | | | | | | | | | 2 | | |
| Madhya Pradesh | 29 | 27 | | | | | | | | | | | 2 | |
| Madras | 75 | 35 | 8 | 2 | 6 | | | | | | | 9 | 15 | |
| Manipur | 2 | 1 | | 1 | | | | | | | | | | |
| Mysore | 11 | 10 | | | 1 | | | | | | | | | |
| Orissa | 20 | 11 | 1 | 1 | | | 6 | | | | | | 1 | |
| PEPSU | 5 | 2 | | | | | | | | | | 2 | 1 | |
| Punjab | 18 | 16 | | | | | | | | | | 2 | | |
| Rajasthan | 20 | 9 | | | | | | 1 | 3 | | 1 | | 6 | |
| Saurashtra | 6 | 6 | | | | | | | | | | | | |
| Travancore–Cochin | 12 | 6 | | | | | | | | | | 2 | 4 | |
| Tripura | 2 | | 2 | | | | | | | | | | | |
| Uttar Pradesh | 86 | 81 | | 2 | | | | | | | | 1 | 2 | |
| Vindhya Pradesh | 6 | 4 | | 1 | 1 | | | | | | | | | |
| West Bengal | 34 | 21 | 5 | | | | | 2 | | | | 3 | | |
| Anglo-Indians | 2 | | | | | | | | | | | | | 2 |
| Total | 499 | 364 | 16 | 12 | 9 | 7 | 6 | 3 | 3 | 2 | 1 | 29 | 37 | 10 |
Source: ECI

==== Assam ====
| Party | Votes | % | Seats |
|---|---|---|---|
| Indian National Congress | 1,210,707 | 45.74 | 11 |
| Socialist Party | 506,943 | 19.15 | 1 |
| Kisan Mazdoor Praja Party | 265,687 | 10.04 | 0 |
| Independents | 363,670 | 13.74 | 0 |
| Other parties | 300,120 | 11.34 | 0 |
| Total | 2,647,127 | 100.00 | 12 |

==== Bihar ====
| Party | Votes | % | Seats |
|---|---|---|---|
| Indian National Congress | 4,573,058 | 45.77 | 45 |
| Socialist Party | 2,126,066 | 21.28 | 3 |
| Jharkhand Party | 749,702 | 7.50 | 3 |
| Lok Sewak Sangh | 309,940 | 3.10 | 2 |
| Chota Nagpur Santhal Parganas Janata Party | 236,094 | 2.36 | 1 |
| Independents | 1,306,660 | 13.08 | 1 |
| Other parties | 690,931 | 6.91 | 0 |
| Total | 9,992,451 | 100.00 | 55 |

==== Bombay ====
| Party | Votes | % | Seats |
|---|---|---|---|
| Indian National Congress | 5,781,277 | 50.15 | 40 |
| Independents | 1,380,484 | 11.97 | 3 |
| Peasants and Workers Party of India | 807,019 | 7.00 | 1 |
| Scheduled Caste Federation | 511,028 | 4.43 | 1 |
| Socialist Party | 1,682,494 | 14.59 | 0 |
| Kisan Mazdoor Praja Party | 639,788 | 5.55 | 0 |
| Other parties | 726,200 | 6.30 | 0 |
| Total | 11,528,290 | 100.00 | 45 |

==== Madhya Pradesh ====
| Party | Votes | % | Seats |
|---|---|---|---|
| Indian National Congress | 3,713,537 | 51.63 | 27 |
| Independents | 858,407 | 11.93 | 2 |
| Kisan Mazdoor Praja Party | 451,749 | 6.28 | 0 |
| Akhil Bharatiya Ram Rajya Parishad | 396,661 | 5.51 | 0 |
| Socialist Party | 877,392 | 12.20 | 0 |
| Other parties | 894,845 | 12.44 | 0 |
| Total | 7,192,591 | 100.00 | 29 |

==== Madras ====
| Party | Votes | % | Seats |
|---|---|---|---|
| Indian National Congress | 7,253,452 | 36.39 | 35 |
| Independents | 4,614,210 | 23.15 | 15 |
| Communist Party of India | 1,783,407 | 8.95 | 8 |
| Kisan Mazdoor Praja Party | 1,952,197 | 9.79 | 6 |
| Tamil Nadu Toilers' Party | 889,292 | 4.46 | 4 |
| Commonweal Party | 325,398 | 1.63 | 3 |
| Socialist Party | 1,055,423 | 5.29 | 2 |
| Forward Bloc (Marxist Group) | 332,196 | 1.67 | 1 |
| Indian Union Muslim League | 79,470 | 0.40 | 1 |
| Other parties | 1,649,116 | 8.27 | 0 |
| Total | 19,934,161 | 100.00 | 75 |

==== Orissa ====
| Party | Votes | % | Seats |
|---|---|---|---|
| Indian National Congress | 1,555,787 | 42.51 | 11 |
| All India Ganatantra Parishad | 959,749 | 26.23 | 6 |
| Socialist Party | 563,462 | 15.40 | 1 |
| Communist Party of India | 211,303 | 5.77 | 1 |
| Independents | 316,538 | 8.65 | 1 |
| Kisan Mazdoor Praja Party | 52,654 | 1.44 | 0 |
| Total | 3,659,493 | 100.00 | 20 |

==== Punjab ====
| Party | Votes | % | Seats |
|---|---|---|---|
| Indian National Congress | 2,134,586 | 42.76 | 16 |
| Shiromani Akali Dal | 569,973 | 11.42 | 2 |
| Zamindar Party | 291,300 | 5.83 | 0 |
| Bharatiya Jana Sangh | 279,639 | 5.60 | 0 |
| Communist Party of India | 251,623 | 5.04 | 0 |
| Independents | 930,383 | 18.64 | 0 |
| Other parties | 534,834 | 10.71 | 0 |
| Total | 4,992,338 | 100.00 | 18 |

==== Uttar Pradesh ====
| Party | Votes | % | Seats |
|---|---|---|---|
| Indian National Congress | 9,047,392 | 52.99 | 81 |
| Socialist Party | 2,208,678 | 12.94 | 2 |
| Independents | 1,936,383 | 11.34 | 2 |
| Hindu Mahasabha | 325,601 | 1.91 | 1 |
| Bharatiya Jana Sangh | 1,244,099 | 7.29 | 0 |
| Other parties | 2,312,822 | 13.55 | 0 |
| Total | 17,074,975 | 100.00 | 86 |

==== West Bengal ====
| Party | Votes | % | Seats |
|---|---|---|---|
| Indian National Congress | 3,205,162 | 42.10 | 24 |
| Communist Party of India | 720,304 | 9.46 | 5 |
| Bharatiya Jana Sangh | 452,279 | 5.94 | 2 |
| Revolutionary Socialist Party | 183,005 | 2.40 | 2 |
| Hindu Mahasabha | 324,870 | 4.27 | 1 |
| Kisan Mazdoor Praja Party | 679,149 | 8.92 | 0 |
| Independents | 1,405,747 | 18.46 | 0 |
| Other parties | 643,417 | 8.45 | 0 |
| Total | 7,613,933 | 100.00 | 34 |

==== Hyderabad ====
| Party | Votes | % | Seats |
|---|---|---|---|
| Indian National Congress | 1,945,798 | 40.08 | 14 |
| People's Democratic Front | 1,367,404 | 28.17 | 7 |
| Socialist Party | 651,316 | 13.42 | 1 |
| Scheduled Caste Federation | 308,591 | 6.36 | 1 |
| Peasants and Workers Party of India | 185,168 | 3.81 | 1 |
| Independents | 388,939 | 8.01 | 1 |
| Hyderabad State Praja Party | 7,646 | 0.16 | 0 |
| Total | 4,854,862 | 100.00 | 25 |

==== Madhya Bharat ====
| Party | Votes | % | Seats |
|---|---|---|---|
| Indian National Congress | 992,159 | 50.79 | 9 |
| Hindu Mahasabha | 122,213 | 6.26 | 2 |
| Akhil Bharatiya Ram Rajya Parishad | 278,475 | 14.25 | 0 |
| Socialist Party | 268,399 | 13.74 | 0 |
| Bharatiya Jana Sangh | 188,569 | 9.65 | 0 |
| Other parties | 103,756 | 5.31 | 0 |
| Total | 1,953,571 | 100.00 | 11 |

==== Mysore ====
| Party | Votes | % | Seats |
|---|---|---|---|
| Indian National Congress | 1,509,075 | 53.43 | 10 |
| Kisan Mazdoor Praja Party | 650,658 | 23.04 | 1 |
| Socialist Party | 181,430 | 6.42 | 0 |
| Independents | 292,472 | 10.36 | 0 |
| Other parties | 190,792 | 6.76 | 0 |
| Total | 2,824,427 | 100.00 | 11 |

==== Patiala and East Punjab States Union ====
| Party | Votes | % | Seats |
|---|---|---|---|
| Indian National Congress | 492,408 | 33.38 | 2 |
| Shiromani Akali Dal | 477,638 | 32.38 | 2 |
| Independents | 311,635 | 21.13 | 1 |
| Other parties | 193,431 | 13.11 | 0 |
| Total | 1,475,112 | 100.00 | 5 |

==== Rajasthan ====
| Party | Votes | % | Seats |
|---|---|---|---|
| Indian National Congress | 1,460,971 | 41.42 | 9 |
| Independents | 1,028,388 | 29.16 | 6 |
| Akhil Bharatiya Ram Rajya Parishad | 331,760 | 9.41 | 3 |
| Krishikar Lok Party | 356,630 | 10.11 | 1 |
| Bharatiya Jana Sangh | 107,089 | 3.04 | 1 |
| Other parties | 242,119 | 6.86 | 0 |
| Total | 3,526,957 | 100.00 | 20 |

==== Saurashtra ====
| Party | Votes | % | Seats |
|---|---|---|---|
| Indian National Congress | 506,112 | 66.36 | 6 |
| Hindu Mahasabha | 99,311 | 13.02 | 0 |
| Independents | 58,343 | 7.65 | 0 |
| Other parties | 98,939 | 12.97 | 0 |
| Total | 762,705 | 100.00 | 6 |

==== Travancore Cochin ====
| Party | Votes | % | Seats |
|---|---|---|---|
| Indian National Congress | 1,224,533 | 35.08 | 6 |
| Independents | 1,265,051 | 36.24 | 4 |
| Travancore Tamil Nadu Congress | 115,893 | 3.32 | 1 |
| Socialist Party | 459,669 | 13.17 | 0 |
| Revolutionary Socialist Party | 220,312 | 6.31 | 0 |
| Other parties | 205,018 | 5.87 | 0 |
| Total | 3,490,476 | 100.00 | 11 |

==== Ajmer ====
| Party | Votes | % | Seats |
|---|---|---|---|
| Indian National Congress | 89,761 | 50.15 | 2 |
| Bharatiya Jana Sangh | 28,990 | 16.20 | 0 |
| Communist Party of India | 25,128 | 14.04 | 0 |
| Akhil Bharatiya Ram Rajya Parishad | 13,624 | 7.61 | 0 |
| Pursharathi Panchayat | 10,778 | 6.02 | 0 |
| Independents | 10,718 | 5.99 | 0 |
| Total | 178,999 | 100.00 | 2 |

==== Bhopal ====
| Party | Votes | % | Seats |
|---|---|---|---|
| Indian National Congress | 97,292 | 57.41 | 2 |
| Hindu Mahasabha | 34,712 | 20.48 | 0 |
| Kisan Mazdoor Mandal | 8,808 | 5.20 | 0 |
| Socialist Party | 3,329 | 1.96 | 0 |
| Independents | 25,316 | 14.94 | – |
| Total | 169,457 | 100.00 | 2 |

==== Bislaspur ====
| Party | Seats |
|---|---|
| Independents | 1 |
| Total | 1 |

Bilaspur constituency was uncontested

==== Coorg ====
| Party | Votes | % | Seats |
|---|---|---|---|
| Indian National Congress | 38,063 | 59.65 | 1 |
| Independents | 25,750 | 40.35 | 0 |
| Total | 63,813 | 100.00 | 1 |

==== Delhi ====
| Party | Votes | % | Seats |
|---|---|---|---|
| Indian National Congress | 324,214 | 49.43 | 3 |
| Kisan Mazdoor Praja Party | 47,735 | 7.28 | 1 |
| Bharatiya Jana Sangh | 169,997 | 25.92 | 0 |
| Independents | 83,045 | 12.66 | 0 |
| Other parties | 30,909 | 4.71 | 0 |
| Total | 655,900 | 100.00 | 4 |

==== Himachal Pradesh ====
| Party | Votes | % | Seats |
|---|---|---|---|
| Indian National Congress | 117,036 | 52.44 | 3 |
| Kisan Mazdoor Praja Party | 27,368 | 12.26 | 0 |
| Bharatiya Jana Sangh | 23,918 | 10.72 | 0 |
| Scheduled Caste Federation | 18,988 | 8.51 | 0 |
| Socialist Party | 16,780 | 7.52 | 0 |
| Independents | 19,099 | 8.56 | 0 |
| Total | 223,189 | 100.00 | 3 |

==== Kutch ====
| Party | Votes | % | Seats |
|---|---|---|---|
| Indian National Congress | 78,771 | 65.87 | 2 |
| Socialist Party | 5,985 | 5.01 | 0 |
| Independents | 34,824 | 29.12 | 0 |
| Total | 119,580 | 100.00 | 2 |

==== Manipur ====
| Party | Votes | % | Seats |
|---|---|---|---|
| Indian National Congress | 36,317 | 23.82 | 1 |
| Socialist Party | 29,372 | 19.26 | 1 |
| All Manipur National Union | 22,083 | 14.48 | 0 |
| Praja Party | 16,955 | 11.12 | 0 |
| Communist Party of India | 13,184 | 8.65 | 0 |
| Kuki National Association | 12,155 | 7.97 | 0 |
| Independents | 13,737 | 9.01 | 0 |
| Other parties | 8,664 | 5.68 | 0 |
| Total | 152,467 | 100.00 | 2 |

==== Tripura ====
| Party | Votes | % | Seats |
|---|---|---|---|
| Communist Party of India | 96,458 | 61.29 | 2 |
| Indian National Congress | 40,263 | 25.58 | 0 |
| Bharatiya Jana Sangh | 9,663 | 6.14 | 0 |
| Independents | 10,987 | 6.98 | 0 |
| Total | 157,371 | 100.00 | 2 |

==== Vindhya Pradesh ====
| Party | Votes | % | Seats |
|---|---|---|---|
| Indian National Congress | 238,220 | 33.75 | 4 |
| Socialist Party | 125,480 | 17.78 | 1 |
| Kisan Mazdoor Praja Party | 106,071 | 15.03 | 1 |
| Bharatiya Jana Sangh | 89,701 | 12.71 | 0 |
| Independents | 94,911 | 13.45 | 0 |
| Other parties | 51,455 | 7.29 | 0 |
| Total | 705,838 | 100.00 | 6 |

=== Notable losses ===
First Law Minister B. R. Ambedkar was defeated in the Bombay (North Central) constituency as Scheduled Castes Federation candidate by his little-known former assistant and Congress Candidate Narayan Sadoba Kajrolkar, who polled 138,137 votes compared to Ambedkar's 123,576 votes. Ambedkar then entered the parliament as a Rajya Sabha member. He contested a by-poll from Bhandara in 1954 in another attempt to enter the Lok Sabha, but again lost, standing third behind PSP winner Ashok Mehta & Congress runner-up B. N. Arjun.

Acharya Kripalani lost from Faizabad in Uttar Pradesh as a KMPP candidate, but his wife Sucheta Kripalani defeated the Congress candidate Manmohini Sahgal in New Delhi.

== Government formation ==
The speaker of the first Lok Sabha was Ganesh Vasudev Mavalankar. The first Lok Sabha also witnessed 677 sittings (3,784 hours), the highest recorded count of the number of sitting hours. The Lok Sabha lasted its full term from 17 April 1952 until 4 April 1957.

== See also ==
- List of members of the 1st Lok Sabha
- Election Commission of India
- 1952 Indian presidential election
