= Khan Shakir Ali Khan =

Indian politician

Khan Shakir Ali Khan (1904 - 1978), popularly known as Sher-e-Bhopal, was an Indian politician, activist, trade unionist and journalist. A leader of the labour movement in Bhopal, Khan led the struggles for the integration of Bhopal State with India. After Independence he served four tenures as state legislator, representing the Communist Party of India.

== Early career ==
Khan was an active Urdu journalist. Around 1926–1927 he worked at the Delhi-based Rayasat and the Calcutta-based Hind. He worked a naik at the Sultania Infantry of Bhopal, and later as a ryotwarri moharrir in the administration of the Nawab of Bhopal. He was well-versed in Persian language.

Khan was active in the struggle against the monarchy in the Bhopal State, and was imprisoned on several occasions. He was fired from his government job in 1932, following which he started to become known for his opposition activities. In 1933 he founded the Anjuman Khuddam-e-Watan (League of Servants of Fatherland), serving as its secretary. The organisation had a parochial character, arguing for the rights of the Bhopali population against the rule of Punjabi Muslims.

=== Struggle against Nawab rule ===
Between 1934 and 1949 he worked at a number of different Urdu newspapers. The publications that he was linked to in Bhopal were frequently banned by the Nawab's government. He set up various trade unions at mills and factories in Bhopal. Together with Tarzi Mashriqi (president of Anjuman Khuddam-e-Watan) he founded the newspaper Sabah-e-Watan in 1934. Serving as its editor, he was jailed in the same year for having published a cartoon mocking the Bhopal judiciary. He was sentenced to two months imprisonment for contempt of court. The arrest provoked popular protests and after seventeen days the government decided to release him. Together with trade union leaders, he founded the Praja Mandal in 1938. He was the president of Praja Mandal, but soon resigned from the post. Khan was jailed for eight months. After his release he was again arrested. He was prosecuted under the Defense of India Rules and sentenced to two years imprisonment. He was jailed at Sehore jail. Upon his release he founded the Mazdoor Sabha ('Workers Union').

== 1952 elections ==
In 1950 the Kisan Mazdoor Mandal ('Peasant Worker Association') was formed by mergerists that left the Indian National Congress en bloc. Khan was the president of KMM. In the 1952 election to the Legislative Assembly of the Bhopal State, Khan contested the Jahangirabad seat as a KMM candidate. He stood against Tarzi Mashriqi, who contested of behalf of the Indian National Congress. Khan finished in second place, with 2,581 votes (43.41% of the votes in the constituency).

He set up the Bhopal State branch of the Communist Party of India in 1952, becoming the president of the state party organisation. Khan played an important role in making Bhopal the capital city of the new Madhya Pradesh state. He was elected to the Madhya Pradesh Legislative Assembly from the Bhopal constituency in 1957, 1962, 1967 and 1972.

== Later political career ==
Khan was a key figure in the Muslim milieu of Bhopal. He served as chairman of the Madhya Pradesh Waqf Board between 19 January 1968 and 6 December 1969. In the 1970s he served as chairman of the Madhya Pradesh Kisan Sangh and a member of the Madhya Pradesh State Council of CPI. He also served as the president of the Madhya Pradesh state unit of the All India Trade Union Congress.

As a legislator, Khan was one of few prominent voices that protested against the setting up the Union Carbide Corporation chemical plant in Bhopal. In a 1969 assembly debate he stated that the setting up of the factory implied 'very high risks'. In 1984 the Union Carbide Corporation plant was the site of a major industrial disaster with thousands of victims.

== Memorials ==
The Khan Shakir Ali Khan Hospital at Bhopal is named after him.
