= Kisan Mazdoor Mandal =

The Kisan Mazdoor Mandal ('Peasant Worker Association', abbreviated KMM) was a political party in Bhopal State, India. The party was formed in 1950 by proponents of a merger with Madhya Bharat, who split away from the Indian National Congress. The party had a Marxian orientation. KMM was supported by the 10,000-member trade union Mazdoor Sabha. Khan Shakir Ali Khan was the president of KMM. In the run-up to the 1952 Bhopal Legislative Assembly election, KMM was the main opposition to the Bhopal Congress.

KMM was recognized by the Election Commission of India as a state party. The party was assigned the election symbol 'cultivator winnowing grain' by the Election Commission. The party published a socialist manifesto before the polls. The election result was a back-lash for the party. KMM became the third-most voted party in the election, contesting 11 out of 30 seats in the state. It obtained 12,255 votes (5.42% of the votes in the state), but didn't win any seats. Khan stood as the KMM candidate in Jahangirabad constituency, finishing in second place with 2,581 votes (43.41% of the votes in the constituency). KMM also fielded one candidate in the 1951-1952 Lok Sabha parliamentary election; Ratankumar in the Sehore constituency. He obtained 8,808 votes (9.28%).
