= Atif Arif Aqueel =

Indian politician

- Atif Arif Aqueel

Member of the Madhya Pradesh Legislative Assembly
- Incumbent
- Assumed office 2023
- Preceded by: Arif Aqueel
- Constituency: Bhopal Uttar

Personal details
- Party: Indian National Congress
- Parent: Arif Aqueel (father)
- Education: Bachelor of Engineering in civil engineering
- Alma mater: Jai Narain College of Technology & Science, Bhopal

Atif Arif Aqueel is an Indian politician and a member of the Madhya Pradesh Legislative Assembly, representing Bhopal Uttar. A member of the Indian National Congress, Atif was elected in the 2023 Madhya Pradesh Legislative Assembly election, succeeding his father, Arif Aqueel.

== Background and education ==
Atif is the son of Arif Aqueel, a former Madhya Pradesh minister and six-time member of the Legislative Assembly who represented Bhopal Uttar.

According to his 2023 election affidavit, Atif completed a Bachelor of Engineering degree in civil engineering at Jai Narain College of Technology & Science, Bhopal, under Rajiv Gandhi Proudyogiki Vishwavidyalaya, in 2013. The affidavit recorded his age as 33 and his occupation as agricultural and allied activities.

== Political career ==
Atif contested the Bhopal Uttar constituency as an Indian National Congress candidate in the 2023 Madhya Pradesh Legislative Assembly election. He received 96,125 votes, representing 56.38 per cent of the votes recorded in the constituency, and defeated Bharatiya Janata Party candidate Alok Sharma by 26,987 votes.

At the age of 33, Atif was among the youngest candidates elected to the Madhya Pradesh Legislative Assembly in 2023. The Association for Democratic Reforms included him in its list of the election's 12 youngest winning candidates.

=== Legislative activity ===
PRS Legislative Research recorded 151 questions asked by Atif between 3 December 2023 and 6 August 2025, compared with a state average of 63.6 questions per legislator during the same period.

=== Bhopal Metro alignment ===
In February 2026, Atif objected to the proposed alignment of a section of the Bhopal Metro Orange Line near the Shahi Qabristan burial ground. He expressed concerns about the project's impact on the cemetery and called for changes to the planned alignment.

=== Resolution on the cow's national status ===
During the Madhya Pradesh Legislative Assembly's 2026 budget session, Atif moved a private member's resolution proposing that the cow be declared India's national animal.
