= Arif Aqueel =

Indian politician (1952–2024)

Arif Aqueel MLA, Cabinet Minister

Member of the Madhya Pradesh Legislative Assembly
- In office 1990–2023
- Preceded by: Rasool Ahmad Siddiqui
- Succeeded by: Atif Arif Aqueel
- Constituency: Bhopal North

Cabinet Minister, Ministry of Minority Affairs and Backward Classes, Government of Madhya Pradesh
- In office 25 December 2018 – 9 March 2020

Cabinet Minister, Ministry of Bhopal Gas Relief and Distribution, Government of Madhya Pradesh
- In office 25 December 2018 – 9 March 2020

Cabinet Minister, Medium and Small Enterprises MSME, Government of Madhya Pradesh
- In office 25 December 2018 – 9 March 2020

State Minister of Minority Welfare, Government of Madhya Pradesh
- In office 1998–2003

State Minister of Bhopal Gas Rahat
- In office 1998–2003

State Minister of Backward and Porniwass Department, Government of Madhya Pradesh
- In office 1998–2003

Personal details
- Born: 14 January 1952 Bhopal, Bhopal State, India
- Died: 29 July 2024 (aged 72) Bhopal, Madhya Pradesh, India
- Party: INC (Indian National Congress)
- Education: BA, LLB, MA, MSc, MPhil
- Alma mater: Barkatullah University
- Profession: Activist, politician

Arif Aqueel (14 January 1952 – 29 July 2024) was an Indian politician and a member of the Indian National Congress party. He was the Muslim MLA from Bhopal Uttar in the state of Madhya Pradesh. He served as a Cabinet Minister, Ministry of Minority Affairs and Backward Classes, Ministry of Bhopal Gas Relief and Distribution, Ministry of Medium and Small Enterprises, Government of Madhya Pradesh. He is the only Muslim minister in Madhya Pradesh to hold this post after a gap of 15 years.

== Political career ==
Aqueel became an MLA in 1990 from Bhopal North constituency and had since been representing it.

Arif Aqueel (also known and referred to as “Sher-e-Bhopal” English translation “The Lion of Bhopal”) started his political career as an activist student leader in 1972. He was appointed President of Saifia College Student Committee in 1977, and in the same year he was elected as Vice President of Youth Congress and NSUI (National Student Union of India) of Madhya Pradesh.

He won his first MLA election, as an independent MLA, in the 9th assembly election by defeating senior Congress leader and ex-Minister Rasool Ahmad Siddiqui in 1990.

For almost three decades, politics in Old Bhopal has centred around one man—Arif Aqueel. It has happened several times that BJP won all the seats in Bhopal, except Arif Aqueel's constituency—Bhopal North & saved Congress’ prestige in the State capital.

Again in 1993 he contested MLA election under the patronage of Janta Dal Party, however, he was overtaken by Ramesh Sharma of BJP Party by small margin. In 1995 he was appointed member of MP Waqf Board and Bar Council, in the same year was elected as President of Nagrik Sahakari Bank.

In 1996 he rejoined Congress Party and in 1998 he contested MLA election and won the eleventh (11th) assembly election by defeating his old rival Ramesh Sharma of BJP.

During 1998 till 2003, Arif Aqueel held many Cabinet Minister positions under Congress Party's Chief Minister Digvijaya Singh of Madhya Pradesh Legislative Assembly. He was nominated as Minister of Minority Welfare, Minister of Bhopal Gas Rahat, Minister of Backward and Porniwass Department. He was also appointed President of MP Hajj Committee.

He again triumphed in the twelfth (12th) assembly election as MLA in 2003, and from February till June 2004 he served as secretary of Vidhan Sabha for Congress and in 2007, he was nominated as Vice President of Madhya Pradesh Congress Committee.

In 2008 he was elected again as an MLA in thirteenth (13th) assembly, in 2012 he became the President of Bhopal Divisional Cricket Association and member of MP Cricket Association, and in 2013 he was appointed Member of Election Committee of Congress for ticket distribution.

In 2013 he was elected again in the fourteenth (14th) assembly MLA election by defeating ex-Cabinet Minister of India Arif Beg who served as National Minister under Atal Bihari Vajpayee Prime Minister of India.

== Personal life and death ==
Aqueel was married to Sairal. He had one daughter and three sons; (eldest to youngest), Erum Aqueel, Majid Aqueel, Atif Aqueel and Abid Aqueel. His daughter is married to Khalid Masoud, a General Manager employed at UPS (United Parcel Service inc.) in Saudi Arabia.

Following a long illness, he died in Bhopal on 29 July 2024, at the age of at the age of 72.

== See also ==
- Madhya Pradesh Legislative Assembly
