= Laxminarayan Sharma =

Indian politician (1933–2008)

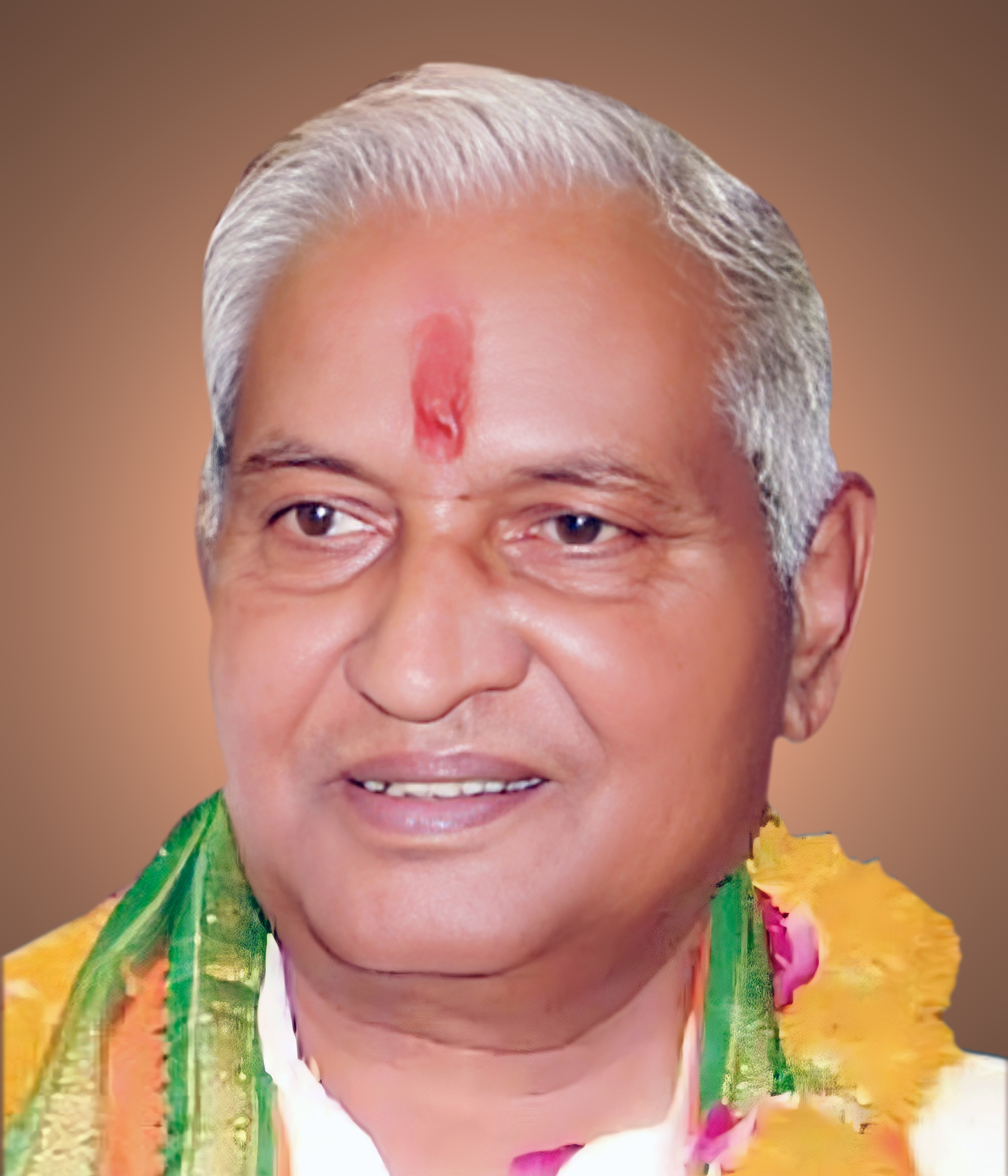

Member of Madhya Pradesh Legislative Assembly
- In office 1967 – 1972
- Preceded by: Bhaiya Lal
- Succeeded by: Gauri Shankar Kaushal Jansangh
- Constituency: Berasia

Member of Madhya Pradesh Legislative Assembly
- In office 1972 – 1977
- Preceded by: Arjun Das
- Constituency: Huzur

Member of Madhya Pradesh Legislative Assembly
- In office 1977 – 1980
- Succeeded by: Babulal Gaur
- Constituency: Govindpura

Member of Madhya Pradesh Legislative Assembly
- In office 1980 – 1998
- Succeeded by: Jodharam Gurjar
- Constituency: Berasia

Member of Parliament, Rajya Sabha
- In office 2004 – 2008
- Succeeded by: Narendra Singh Tomar
- Constituency: Madhya Pradesh

Personal details
- Born: 5 September 1933 Karondiya
- Died: 17 October 2008 (aged 75)
- Party: Bharatiya Janata Party (1980-2008); Janata Party (1977-1980); Bharatiya Jana Sangh (1956-1977)
- Spouse: Laxmi Devi Sharma
- Education: Vikram University (LL.B), Barkatullah University (MA)

Laxminarayan Sharma (5 September 1933 – 17 October 2008), also known as L. N. Sharma, was an Indian politician from Bharatiya Janata Party and was a member of the Parliament of India representing Madhya Pradesh in the Rajya Sabha, the upper house of the Indian Parliament. He was a former cabinet minister of the Madhya Pradesh Legislative Assembly. He began his legislative career in 1967 and was an MLA for 35 years.

Laxminarayan Sharma was a visionary leader and played a significant role in the development of Madhya Pradesh especially in the agriculture sector and strived for the upliftment of the rural communities. He is well known for his work during the 1984 Bhopal disaster.

He joined the Rashtriya Swayamsevak Sangh at a young age and was a teacher by profession in a government school in Madhya Pradesh. He had penned many poems during his political career.

Shri L.N Sharma died on 17 October 2008 in New Delhi due to a heart attack at the age of 75. His last rites were performed with full state honors in Bhopal.

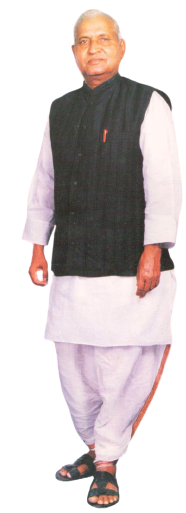

== Early life and education ==
Laxminarayan Sharma was born to a Hindu family in Karondiya village, in the Bhopal district, and belonged to the Brahmin community. His family and parents were involved in farming and agricultural activities. He was a teacher in school and had completed B.Ed., M.A. He was also a gold medalist in LL.B. from Vikram University, Ujjain (Madhya Pradesh). He is survived by his wife Smt. Laxmidevi Sharma and they have three sons and two daughters.

== Political career ==
L.N Sharma was first elected to the Madhya Pradesh Legislative Assembly in 1967 from the Bharatiya Jana Sangh. He was one of the only few members of the Bharatiya Jana Sangh from Bhopal. He was a Government Teacher before he entered active politics. His roles in the opposition had kept the government on the toes. He was consecutively elected seven times to the Madhya Pradesh Legislative Assembly from 1967 to 1993. He began his political career with Jana Sangh which merged with Janata Party in 1977. Sharma was detained for 19 months during The Emergency under the Maintenance of Internal Security Act (MISA).

He had later represented the Bharatiya Janata Party and held various important minister portfolios and was a senior cabinet minister. Sharma was known for his straight forward approach and fearless attitude. He played a major role in establishing and expanding the early footprints of Bharatiya Janata Party in Bhopal constituency and Madhya Pradesh. He had left his home constituency and moved to different constituencies in order to expand the party's reach and establish a strong cadre.

He was Minister of Revenue, Cooperative, Agriculture and Irrigation during his time at Madhya Pradesh Legislative Assembly in various terms. In 2004 he was elected as Member of Parliament, Rajya Sabha from Madhya Pradesh.

While Sharma was a sitting member of parliament he succumbed to his cardiac arrest in 2008. Narendra Singh Tomar was then nominated on the vacant seat thereafter.

== Positions held ==
Sharma contested from various seats in Bhopal and built a stronghold in the city during the initial days of Bharatiya Janata Party. He also held many portfolios during his tenure as cabinet minister.

- 1967-1972 MLA from Berasia, Bhopal
- 1972-1977 MLA from Huzur, Bhopal
- 1977-1980 MLA from Govindpura, Bhopal
- 1980-1985 MLA from Berasia, Bhopal
- 1985-1990 MLA from Berasia, Bhopal
- 1990-1993 MLA from Berasia, Bhopal
- 1993-1998 MLA from Berasia, Bhopal
- 2004-2006 Member of Parliament, Rajya Sabha, Madhya Pradesh
