= 1952 Bhopal State Legislative Assembly election =

Indian state election

1952 Bhopal Legislative Assembly election
- 27 March 1952

All 30 seats in the Bhopal Legislative Assembly 16 seats needed for a majority
- Registered: 610,182
- Turnout: 37.07%
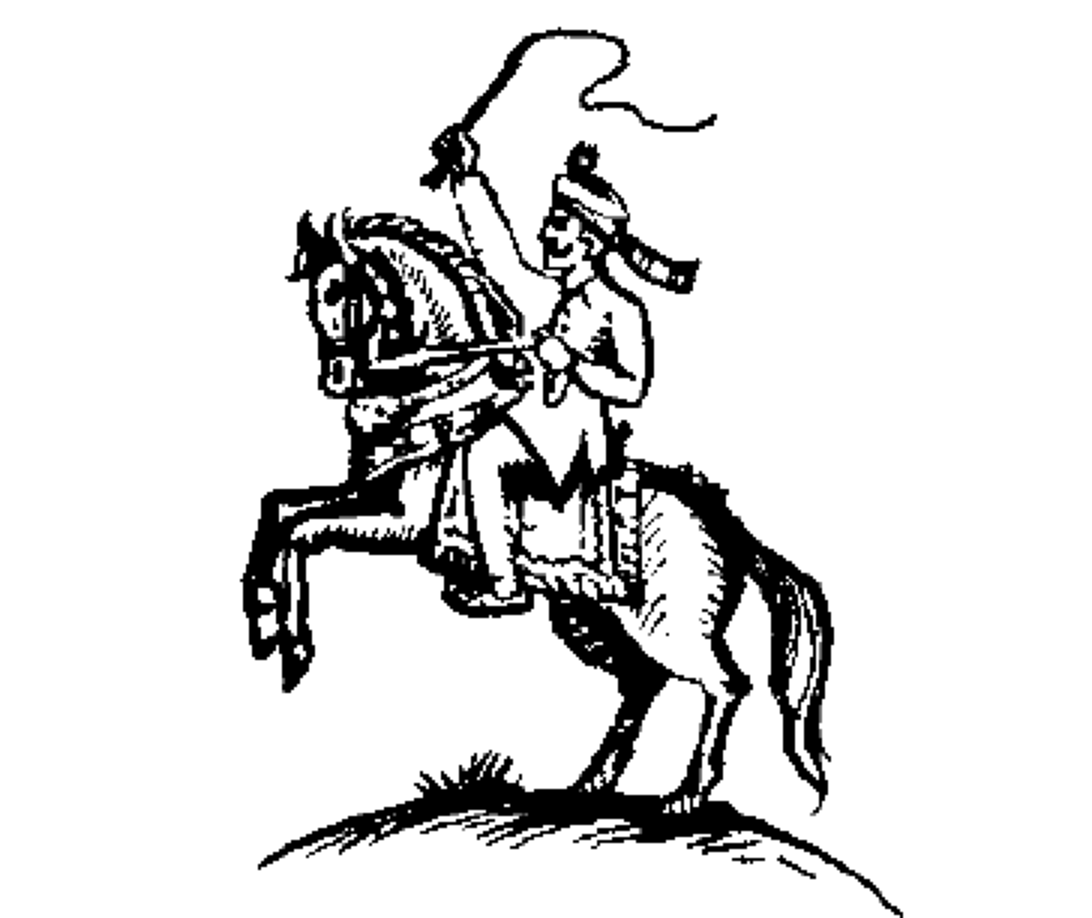
	First party	Second party
	INC
Party	INC	ABHM
Seats won	25	1
Popular vote	1,17,656	31,684
Percentage	52.01%	14.01
Elected Chief Minister of Bhopal
Shankar Dayal Sharma
INC

Indian administrative divisions, as of 1951

Elections to the Bhopal Legislative Assembly were held on March 27, 1952. The Indian National Congress won a majority of seats, and Shankar Dayal Sharma became the chief minister.

== Constituencies ==
The Bhopal Legislative Assembly consisted of 30 seats, distributed in seven two-member constituencies and sixteen single-member constituencies. A total of 91 contestants were in the fray for these 30 seats. Silwani legislative assembly had the maximum number of contestants (eight candidates), while Ichhawar had the minimum contestants (only one candidate, who was elected unopposed).

== Political parties ==
Four national parties, along with Kisan Mazdoor Mandal, took part in the assembly election. Indian National Congress emerged as the single largest party, while no other party crossed into double digits.

== Results ==
Summary of results of the 1952 Bhopal Legislative Assembly election
Political party	Seats contested	Won	% of seats	Votes	Vote %
Indian National Congress	28	25	83.33	1,17,656	52.01
Akhil Bharatiya Hindu Mahasabha	9	1	3.33	31,684	14.01
Independent politician	32	4	13.33	51,736	22.87
Total seats	30	Voters	6,10,182	Turnout	2,26,210 (37.07%)

== Elected members ==
#	Constituency	Member	Party
1	Shahajahanabad	Jalauddin Qureshi	Indian National Congress
2	Shishmahal	Syed Ajazuddin	Indian National Congress
3	Jahangirabad	Inayatullah Tarzi Mashriqui	Indian National Congress
4	Bairagarh	Baboolal Bhartia	Indian National Congress
4	Bairagarh	Lila Rai	Indian National Congress
5	Huzur	Sardarmal Lalwani	Independent
6	Berasia	Shankar Dayal Sharma	Indian National Congress
7	Nazirabad	Shankar Dayal	Hindu Mahasabha
8	Sehore	Umrao Singh	Indian National Congress
8	Sehore	Sultan Mohd Khan	Indian National Congress
9	Shyampur	Har Kishan Singh	Indian National Congress
9	Shyampur	Baboolal	Indian National Congress
10	Ashta	Chandan Mal	Indian National Congress
10	Ashta	Gopi Das	Indian National Congress
11	Kotri	Maimoona Sultan	Indian National Congress
12	Ichhawar	Kesarimal Jain	Indian National Congress
13	Nasrullahganj	Vanshi Dhar	Indian National Congress
14	Budhni	Lachmi Narain	Indian National Congress
15	Raisen	Baboolal	Indian National Congress
15	Raisen	Kamta Prashad	Indian National Congress
16	Begumganj	Kundan Lal	Indian National Congress
17	Sultanganj	Baboolal Kamal	Indian National Congress
18	Goharganj	Dalip Singh	Independent
18	Goharganj	Gulab Chand	Independent
19	Amrawad	Narbada Charan Lal	Indian National Congress
20	Bareli	Shyam Sundar	Indian National Congress
21	Silwani	Lila Dhar Rathi	Indian National Congress
21	Silwani	Daulat Shah	Independent
22	Udaipur	Nit Gopal	Indian National Congress
23	Deori	Ram Karan Lal	Indian National Congress

== State reorganisation and merger ==
On November 1, 1956, Bhopal State was merged into Madhya Pradesh under the States Reorganisation Act, 1956.

== See also ==
- 1951–52 elections in India
- Bhopal State (1949–56)
- 1952 Madhya Bharat Legislative Assembly election
- 1952 Madhya Pradesh Legislative Assembly election
- 1952 Vindhya Pradesh Legislative Assembly election
