= Sushil Chandra Varma =

Indian politician

Member of Parliament, Lok Sabha
- In office 1989–1999
- Preceded by: K. N. Pradhan
- Succeeded by: Uma Bharti
- Constituency: Bhopal

Personal details
- Born: 24 February 1926 Khandwa, Central Provinces and Berar, British India
- Died: 6 October 2011 (aged 85)
- Party: Bharatiya Janata Party
- Spouse: Renu Varma (m. 1951–2011)
- Education: University of Allahabad, earning an MSc, PhD in sociology

Sushil Chandra Varma (24 February 1926 – 6 October 2011) was an Indian politician.

Sushil Chandra Varma was born on 24 February 1926 in Khandwa, Madhya Pradesh and married Renu Varma in 1951. He attended the University of Bhopal and the University of Allahabad, earning an MSc in chemistry and a PhD in sociology. He joined the Indian Administrative Service in 1949 and held various posts in Madhya Pradesh and in Delhi.

Varma was elected from the Bhopal constituency to the 9th, 10th, 11th and 12th Lok Sabhas, with the first of those elections occurring in 1991. He was a member of various parliamentary committees and of the Bharatiya Janata Party.

He committed suicide in 2011, having suffered from ill-health for some years previously.
