= Vishvas Sarang =

Indian politician (born 1971)

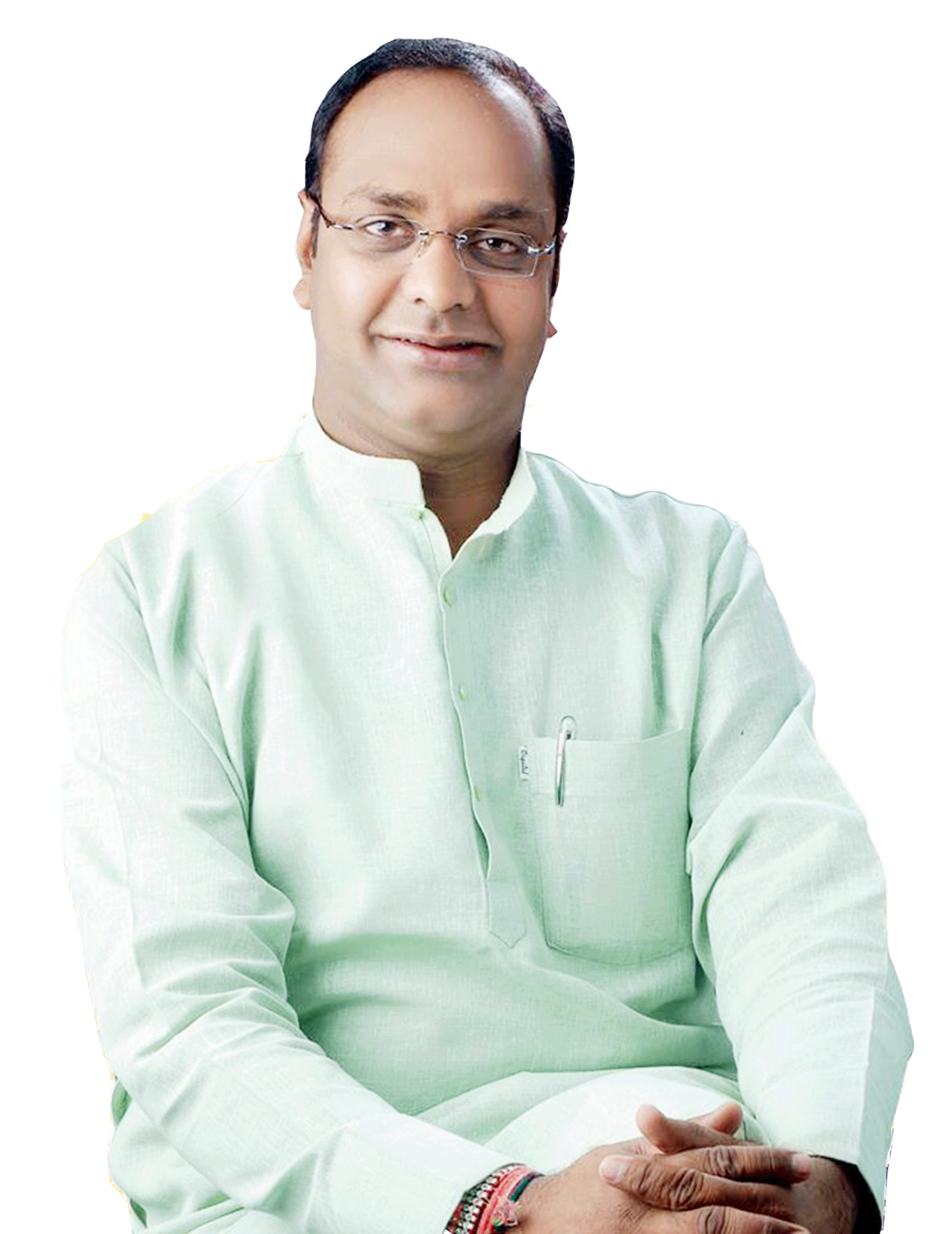

Cabinet Minister, Madhya Pradesh Government
- Incumbent
- Assumed office 25 December 2023
- Chief Minister: Mohan Yadav
- Ministry & Departments: Sports And Youth Affairs; Co-operatives
- Preceded by: Yashodhara Raje Scindia; Arvind Singh Bhadoria
- In office 2013 – December 2018
- Chief Minister: Shivraj Singh Chouhan
- Ministry & Departments: Bhopal Gas Tragedy Relief & Rehabilitation
- Succeeded by: Arif Aqueel

Member of the Madhya Pradesh Legislative Assembly
- Incumbent
- Assumed office 2008
- Preceded by: New constituency
- Constituency: Narela

Minister of State for Rural Development, Madhya Pradesh Government
- In office 2013 – December 2018
- Chief Minister: Shivraj Singh Chouhan
- Succeeded by: Kamleshwar Patel

Personal details
- Born: 29 December 1971 (age 54) Bhopal, Madhya Pradesh, India
- Party: Bharatiya Janata Party
- Profession: Politician
- Website: facebook.com/VishvasSarangBJP/about
- Source

Vishvas Sarang is an Indian politician from Madhya Pradesh associated with Bharatiya Janata Party. He is a member of Madhya Pradesh Legislative Assembly from Narela in Bhopal district. He first served as a corporator of the then Bhopal South Vidhansabha constituency from the same Bhartiya Janta Party. He belongs to Kayastha Hindu community. Sarang served as the minister for Gas Tragedy Relief and Rehabilitation (Independent Charge) and Panchayat and Rural Development in Madhya Pradesh under chief minister Shivraj Singh Chauhan from 2013 to 2018.

He is an engineering graduate. He started his political career as the corporator of one of the wards of the then Bhopal South Vidhansabha. New constituencies were made in Bhopal in the year 2008, namely Narela, Bhopal Madhya, and Huzur. He got the benefit of being the corporator of Narela, as well as being the son of ex-Rajyasabha MP, Kailash Sarang. Sarang won the seat at the age of 37.

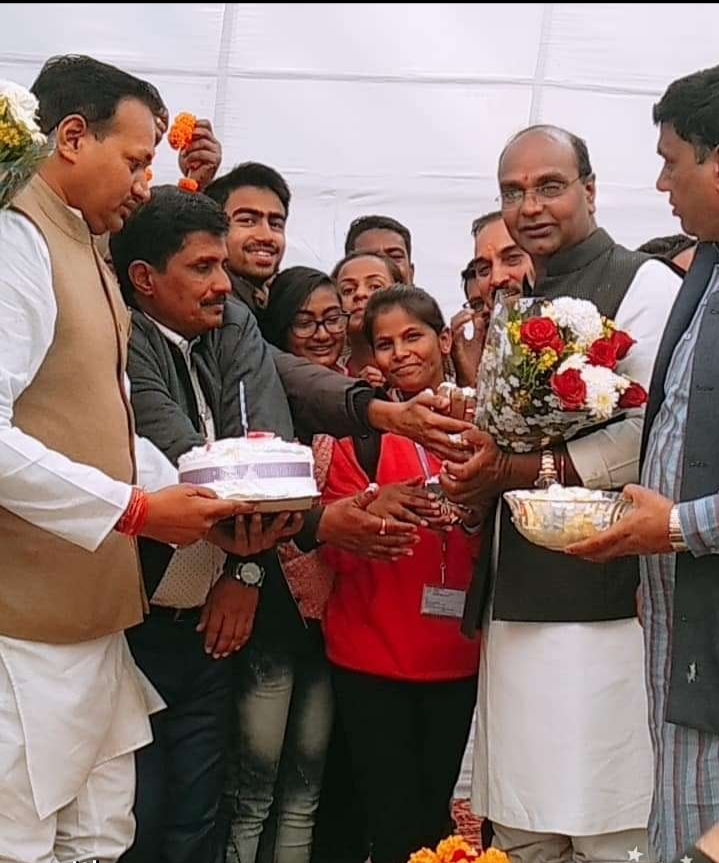
Vishwas sarang celebrating his birthday with Journalist Isa Ahmad and other renowned people including his family and friends, at his residence in Bhopal

He again contested election against Congress candidate Sunil Sood in 2013, won the seat with increased margin, and became minister in the Shivraj singh chouhan government. Later in 2018, he won the seat against Congress heavyweight, Dr. Mahendra Singh Chouhan.
