= Narela, Madhya Pradesh Assembly constituency =

Electoral constituency of Madhya Pradesh state, India

Coordinates: 23.16°N 77.26°E

Narela
- Constituency No. 151 for the Madhya Pradesh Legislative Assembly

Constituency details
- Country: India
- Region: Central India
- State: Madhya Pradesh
- District: Bhopal
- Lok Sabha constituency: Bhopal
- Established: 2008
- Reservation: None

Member of Legislative Assembly
- 16th Madhya Pradesh Legislative Assembly
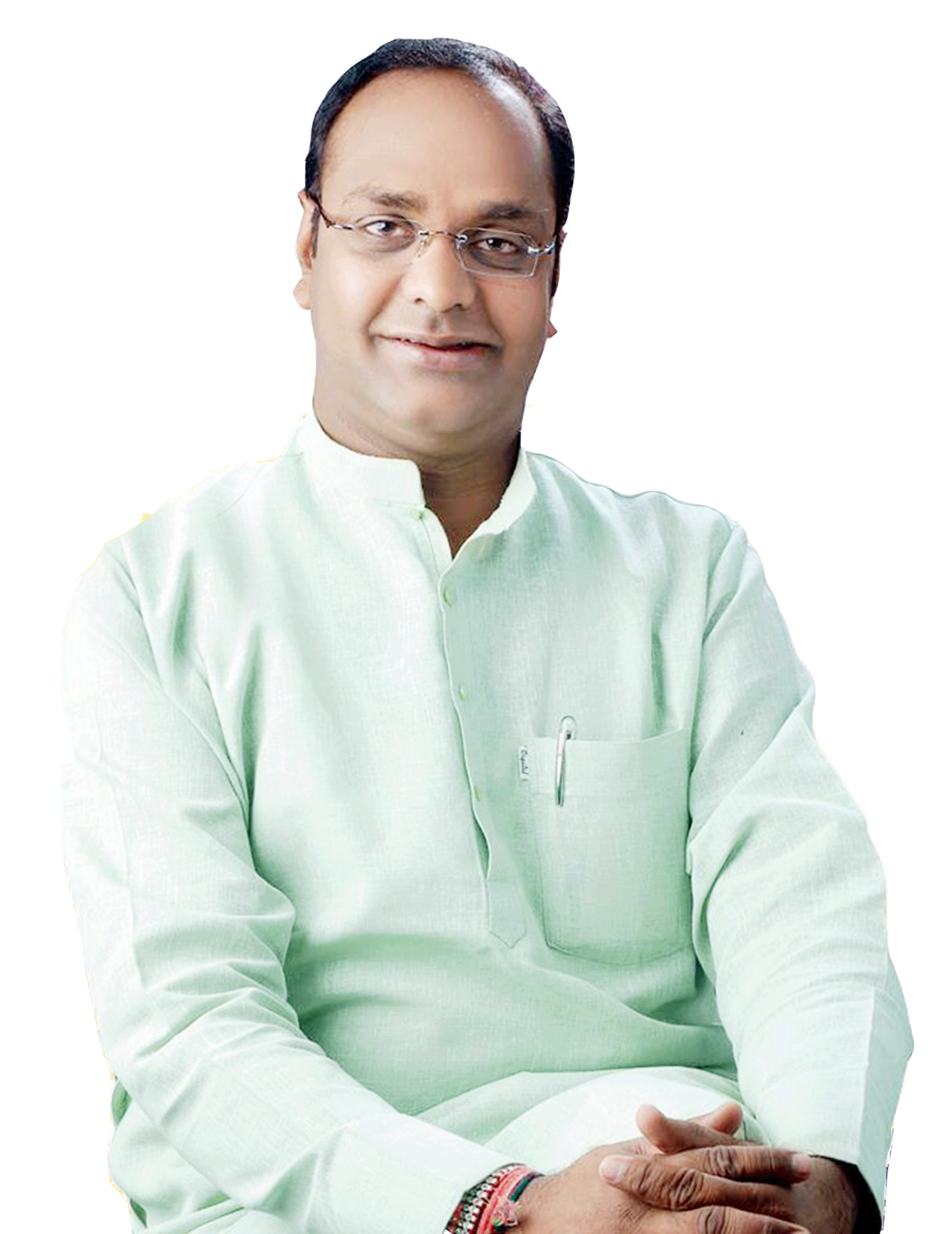
- Incumbent Vishvas Sarang
- Party: Bharatiya Janata Party
- Elected year: 2023

Narela is one of the 230 constituencies of Madhya Pradesh. It comes under Bhopal district. Narela Assembly seat came into existence in the year 2008. As of 2023, its representative is Vishvas Sarang of the Bharatiya Janata Party.

== Members of the Legislative Assembly ==
Election	Name	Party
2008	Vishvas Sarang	Bharatiya Janata Party
2013	Vishvas Sarang	Bharatiya Janata Party
2018	Vishvas Sarang	Bharatiya Janata Party
2023	Vishvas Sarang	Bharatiya Janata Party

== Election results ==
=== 2023 ===
2023 Madhya Pradesh Legislative Assembly election: Narela
Party	Candidate	Votes	%	±%
BJP	Vishvas Sarang	124,552	54.05	+0.81
INC	Manoj Shukla	99,983	43.38	+1.49
NOTA	None of the above	878	0.38	−0.18
Majority		24,569	10.67	−0.68
Turnout		230,457	65.97	+0.08
BJP hold		Swing		

=== 2018 ===
2018 Madhya Pradesh Legislative Assembly election: Narela
Party	Candidate	Votes	%	±%
BJP	Vishvas Sarang	108,654	53.24	
INC	Mahendra Singh Chouhan	85,503	41.89	
BSP	Meharban Singh Titoriya	2,297	1.13	
NOTA	None of the above	1,135	0.56	
Majority		23,151	11.35	
Turnout		204,094	65.89	
BJP hold		Swing		

== See also ==
- List of constituencies of the Madhya Pradesh Legislative Assembly
- Bhopal district
