= Alok Sharma (Indian politician) =

Indian politician, Member of Parliament

Member of Parliament, Lok Sabha
- Incumbent
- Assumed office 4 June 2024
- Preceded by: Pragya Thakur
- Constituency: Bhopal

Personal details
- Born: 25 November 1967 (age 58)
- Party: Bharatiya Janata Party
- Spouse: Shraddha Sharma
- Children: 2 Sons
- Parent(s): Gauri Shankar Sharma, Vidhya Sharma
- Education: Bhopal University
- Profession: politician

Alok Sharma (Hindi pronunciation: [əloːk ʃəɾmaː]) is an Indian politician who was elected to 18th Lok Sabha from Bhopal on a BJP ticket.

Alok Sharma joined politics from the Rashtriya Swayamsevak Sangh and later through the Bharatiya Janata Party, serving in various capacities in the party, becoming the Corporator of the Bhopal Municipal Corporation in 1994, the State Convener of the Bharatiya Janata Yuva Morcha (BJYM) in 1997, and then elected as a Corporator in 2015, and served as the Mayor of Bhopal from 2015 to 2020. He later contested the 2023 Madhya Pradesh Legislative Assembly elections from the North Bhopal constituency, losing to Congress candidate Atif Arif Aqeel.

Alok Sharma contested the 2024 Lok Sabha elections as a BJP candidate from the Bhopal constituency and won by a margin of 5,01,499 votes against his nearest rival Congress candidate Arun Srivastava.
