= Bhagwan Singh (politician) =

Indian politician

- Constituency: Berasia Vidhan Sabha

Bhagwan Singh was an Indian politician from the state of the Madhya Pradesh. He represented Berasia Vidhan Sabha constituency of undivided Madhya Pradesh Legislative Assembly by winning General election of 1957.
