= Bhopal Uttar Assembly constituency =

Constituency of the Madhya Pradesh legislative assembly in India

Coordinates: 23.270°N 77.391°E

Bhopal Uttar
- Constituency No. 150 for the Madhya Pradesh Legislative Assembly

Constituency details
- Country: India
- Region: Central India
- State: Madhya Pradesh
- District: Bhopal
- Lok Sabha constituency: Bhopal
- Established: 1977
- Reservation: None

Member of Legislative Assembly
- 16th Madhya Pradesh Legislative Assembly
- Incumbent Atif Aqueel
- Party: Indian National Congress
- Elected year: 2023
- Preceded by: Arif Aqueel

Bhopal Uttar Assembly constituency is one of the 230 assembly constituencies of Madhya Pradesh. It comes under Bhopal district.

== Members of the Legislative Assembly ==
Year	Name	Party
1977	Hamid Qureshi	Janata Party
1980	Rasool Siddiqui	Indian National Congress (Indira)
1985	Rasool Siddiqui	Indian National Congress
1990	Arif Aqueel	Independent
1993	Ramesh Sharma	Bharatiya Janata Party
1998	Arif Aqueel	Indian National Congress
2003	Arif Aqueel	Indian National Congress
2008	Arif Aqueel	Indian National Congress
2013	Arif Aqueel	Indian National Congress
2018	Arif Aqueel	Indian National Congress
2023	Atif Aqueel	Indian National Congress

== Election results ==
=== 2023 ===
2023 Madhya Pradesh Legislative Assembly election: Bhopal Uttar
Party	Candidate	Votes	%	±%
INC	Atif Aqueel	96,125	56.38	−2.39
BJP	Alok Sharma	69,138	40.55	+4.44
Independent	Aamir Aqueel	1,837	1.08	
NOTA	None of the above	774	0.45	−0.44
Majority		26,987	15.83	−6.83
Turnout		170,491	69.44	+3.84
INC hold		Swing		

=== 2018 ===
2018 Madhya Pradesh Legislative Assembly election: Bhopal Uttar
Party	Candidate	Votes	%	±%
INC	Arif Aqueel	90,403	58.77	
BJP	Fatima Siddiqui	55,546	36.11	
Independent	Shubham Arya	4,491	2.92	
NOTA	None of the above	1,368	0.89	
Majority		34,857	22.66	
Turnout		153,820	65.6	
INC hold		Swing		

=== 2013 ===
2013 Madhya Pradesh Legislative Assembly election: Bhopal Uttar
Party	Candidate	Votes	%	±%
INC	Arif Aqueel	73,070	50.70	
BJP	Arif Baig	66,406	46.08	
BSP	Sanjay Narware	1,335	0.93	N/A
NOTA	None of the Above	2,337	1.62	
Majority		6,664		
Turnout		144,123	63.88	
INC hold		Swing		
