= Sheetla Sahai =

Indian politician

Cabinet Minister, Government of Madhya Pradesh
- Constituency: Gwalior

Member of the Madhya Pradesh Legislative Assembly
- Incumbent
- Assumed office 1967

Personal details
- Born: 1932
- Died: 2011
- Political party: Bharatiya Janata Party
- Occupation: Politician

Sheetla Sahai (1932–2011) was a leader of Bharatiya Janata Party. He was a cabinet minister in Government of Madhya Pradesh. He represented Gwalior in the Madhya Pradesh Legislative Assembly. He died in 2011. He was elected MLA for the first time in 1967. He served as Opposition Leader and also as Cabinet Minister and held portfolios of health, housing, public contact, home, transport, jail, irrigation, Narmada Valley Development.

Sahai is survived by his daughters, Archana Shrivastava (nee Sahai), Alka Pradhan (nee Sahai) and Achala Sahai. Alka is married to Vinod Pradhan, son of Late K.N. Pradhan, a prominent Congress Leader from Madhya Pradesh, erstwhile member of Eighth Lok Sabha representing Bhopal parliamentary constituency of Madhya Pradesh and served as Cabinet Minister in the Government of Madhya Pradesh from 1969 to 1972.
