= K. N. Pradhan =

Indian politician

K. N. Pradhan (1932 – 17 July 1999) was a prominent social and political worker and a well-known and active trade unionist. He was member of Eighth Lok Sabha representing Bhopal parliamentary constituency of Madhya Pradesh. Earlier, he was a member of the Madhya Pradesh Legislative Assembly from 1967 to 1972 and from 1980 to 1985. He also served as Cabinet Minister in the Government of Madhya Pradesh from 1969 to 1972.

Pradhan is survived by five children. His son, Vinod Pradhan, is married to Alka Pradhan (née Sahai) daughter of Late Sheetla Sahai a leader of Bhartiya Janta Party.
