= Rameshwar Sharma =

Indian politician

Member of Madhya Pradesh Legislative Assembly
- Incumbent
- Assumed office 2013
- Preceded by: Jitendra Daga
- Constituency: Huzur

Personal details
- Political party: Bharatiya Janata Party
- Profession: Politician

Rameshwar Sharma is an Indian politician from Madhya Pradesh. He is a three time elected Member of the Madhya Pradesh Legislative Assembly from 2013, 2018, and 2023, representing Huzur Assembly constituency as a Member of the Bharatiya Janata Party.

== See also ==
- List of chief ministers of Madhya Pradesh
- Madhya Pradesh Legislative Assembly
