= Manmohini Zutshi Sahgal =

Indian freedom fighter and politician

- Born: c. 1909; Allahabad, British India
- Died: 1994
- Occupation: Indian freedom fighter
- Organization: Indian National Congress

Manmohini Sahgal (née Zutshi, 1909–1994) was an Indian freedom fighter and politician. She was a member of the Nehru–Gandhi family.

== Biography ==
Her father was a nephew to Motilal Nehru, and she was therefore Jawaharlal Nehru's first cousin once removed. She was born and grew up in Motilal Nehru's home in Allahabad. As many others in the family, she was an active participant in India's struggle for independence.

A leader in student politics during her college years, Sahgal followed her mother and sisters in brief prison terms for demonstrating against the British Raj. Between 1930 and 1935, Sahgal finished college, became a teacher and was a member of the revolutionary Indian National Congress.

In 1935, Sahgal married a government bureaucrat and had to give up politics as well as active association with her old friends. In her autobiography she describes following her husband to various posts, supervising a growing household. Sahgal joined various ladies clubs and volunteer welfare organizations: as a member of the Catering Advisory Committee for the North Eastern Railway, she investigated charges against "crooked" vendors at train stations.

She made an unsuccessful run for public office in a New Delhi by-election in 1961, she was supported by the Swatantra Party under Sir Sobha Singh, though an inter-party coup led by the Socialist manager of the Delhi Swatantra Party led to her loss.

== Autobiography ==
- Manmohini Zutshi Sahgal (1994). Geraldine Forbes (ed.). An Indian Freedom Fighter Recalls Her Life. Armonk, N.Y.: M.E. Sharpe. ISBN 978-1-56324-339-4.
