= State Legislative Assemblies of India =

Lower (or only) house of an Indian state or territory

The State Legislative Assembly, also known as the Vidhan Sabha, the Niyama Sabha, or the Saasana Sabha, is a legislative body in each of the states and certain union territories of India. Members of the legislative assembly are often directly elected to serve five year terms from single-member constituencies. A legislative assembly may be dissolved in a state of emergency, by the governor on request of the chief minister of the respective state or union territory, or if a motion of no confidence is passed against the ruling majority party or coalition.

== Definition and powers ==
As per the Constitution of India, where there is a unicameral legislature, the legislative body is termed as the legislative assembly. In bicameral jurisdictions, there exists a State Legislative Council. The legislative assembly has the power to create or abolish the legislative council of the respective state or union territory by passing a resolution to that effect by a majority of not less than two-thirds of the members present and voting. The term of a legislative assembly is fixed at five years unless it is dissolved prior to it. In certain cases such as an emergency of the state, the term can be extended by the Indian parliament for one year at a time. The Governor of the respective state shall convene the assembly periodically, with no more than six months gap between consecutive sessions. The assembly is presided over by a speaker, who shall be a member of the assembly and elected by the members of that constituent assembly.

The state legislature has the power to enact laws concerning state subjects as defined in the constitution. The union territories which have a legislature have certain restrictions in terms of these powers. In a bicameral legislature, a legislative assembly holds equal legislative power with the upper house of the state legislature, the State Legislative Council, in terms of passing of bills except in case of money bills. A normal bill can originate in any of the house, and is deemed to be passed only if it is cleared by both houses. If a bill is passed by the legislative assembly, it should not be held for more than three months by the council. If the bill is sent back by the council, and is again passed by the assembly, the council is expected to act on it within one month. If the time elapses or if it is sent back, the bill is deemed to have been passed with or without any amendments if any are made by the legislative assembly. In case of money bills, it shall be introduced only in the assembly and the assembly can accept or reject the recommendations if any that are communicated from the council.

A motion of no confidence against the government in the state can only be introduced in the state legislative assembly. If it is passed by a majority vote, then the chief minister and her/his council of ministers must collectively resign.

== Members ==
The Constitution of India states that a legislative assembly must have no less than 60 members and a maximum of 500 members. However an exception may be granted via an act of the Indian parliament and is the case in the states of Goa, Sikkim, Mizoram and the union territory of Puducherry which have fewer than 60 members.

A Member of the Legislative Assembly (MLA) is directly elected from single-member constituencies, which are divided roughly equally based on the population of the region. The number of seats may be revised following a census by an act of the parliament. A few assemblies have nominated members such as the case of Jammu and Kashmir and Puducherry. To become a Member of Legislative Assembly, a person must be of minimum 25 years of age and be a citizen of India. He/she might not hold any other government office, and should declare the information required by the election commission including any criminal procedures against him or her.

After the election of a member, he/she is expected to take an oath of affirmation. The members are paid salaries and allowances as fixed by the respective assemblies. A member of the assembly may resign on his/her own accord. A member can also be disqualified if found to hold another office of profit in the government, is of no sound mind, has been declared insolvent, or ineligible by a court of law. Members of the assembly are exempt from any legal cases arising out of what has been said in the assembly.

== Legislative assemblies ==
In 28 states and three union territories, there is a unicameral legislature which is the sole legislative body. In six states, the legislative assembly is the lower house of their bicameral legislature with the upper house being the State Legislative Council. Five union territories are governed directly by the union government and have no legislative body.

List of Legislative Assemblies
Legislative assembly	Seat(s)	No. of members	Ruling party (Note: The political party of the chief minister)	Current term
Andhra Pradesh	Amaravati	175	Telugu Desam Party	16th
Arunachal Pradesh	Itanagar	60	Bharatiya Janata Party	11th
Assam	Dispur	126	Bharatiya Janata Party	16th
Bihar	Patna	243	Bharatiya Janata Party	18th
Chhattisgarh	Raipur	90	Bharatiya Janata Party	6th
Delhi	New Delhi	70	Bharatiya Janata Party	8th
Goa	Panaji	40	Bharatiya Janata Party	8th
Gujarat	Gandhinagar	182	Bharatiya Janata Party	15th
Haryana	Chandigarh	90	Bharatiya Janata Party	15th
Himachal Pradesh	Shimla (summer); Dharamshala (winter)	68	Indian National Congress	14th
Jammu and Kashmir	Srinagar (summer); Jammu (winter)	95 (Note: Five nominated members)	Jammu & Kashmir National Conference	1st (UT)
Jharkhand	Ranchi	81	Jharkhand Mukti Morcha	6th
Karnataka	Bengaluru (summer); Belgaum (winter)	224	Indian National Congress	16th
Keralam	Thiruvananthapuram	140	Indian National Congress	16th
Madhya Pradesh	Bhopal	230	Bharatiya Janata Party	16th
Maharashtra	Mumbai (summer); Nagpur (winter)	288	Bharatiya Janata Party	15th
Manipur	Imphal	60	Bharatiya Janata Party	12th
Meghalaya	Shillong	60	National People's Party	11th
Mizoram	Aizawl	40	Zoram People's Movement	9th
Nagaland	Kohima	60	Naga People's Front	14th
Odisha	Bhubaneshwar	147	Bharatiya Janata Party	17th
Puducherry	Puducherry	33 (Note: Three nominated members)	All India N.R. Congress	16th
Punjab	Chandigarh	117	Aam Aadmi Party	16th
Rajasthan	Jaipur	200	Bharatiya Janata Party	16th
Sikkim	Gangtok	32	Sikkim Krantikari Morcha	11th
Tamil Nadu	Chennai	234	Tamilaga Vettri Kazhagam	17th
Telangana	Hyderabad	119	Indian National Congress	3rd
Tripura	Agartala	60	Bharatiya Janata Party	13th
Uttar Pradesh	Lucknow	403	Bharatiya Janata Party	18th
Uttarakhand	Bhararisain (summer); Dehradun (winter)	70	Bharatiya Janata Party	5th
West Bengal	Kolkata	294	Bharatiya Janata Party	18th
Total	—	4,131	—	

=== By Ruling Party and Alliance ===
The Bharatiya Janata Party-led National Democratic Alliance is in power in 22 legislative assemblies; the Indian National Developmental Inclusive Alliance is in power in 6 legislative assemblies while three legislative assemblies are ruled by three other parties.

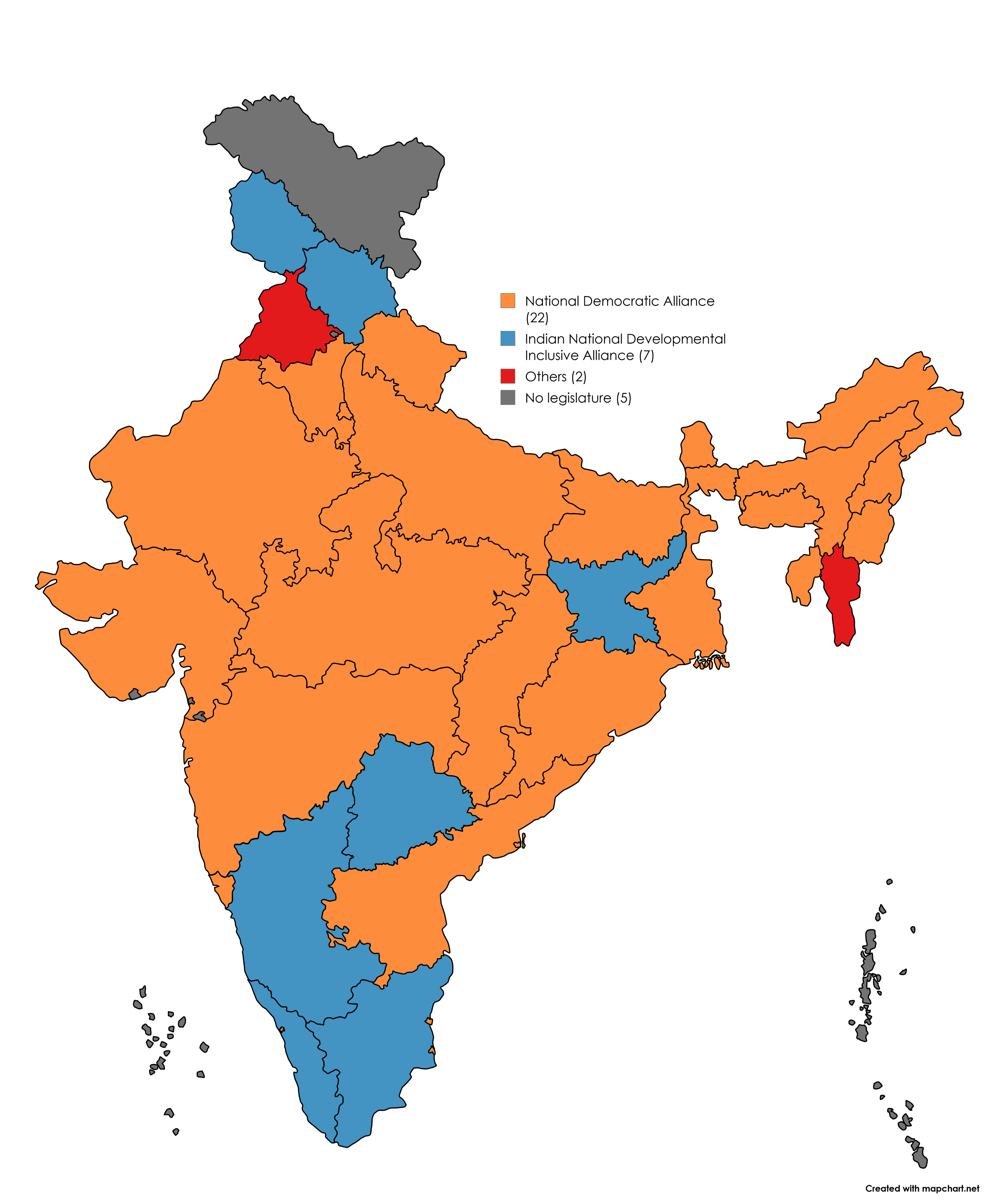
Colour-coded map of India showing the ruling alliances in various states and union territories: National Democratic Alliance (22) Indian National Developmental Inclusive Alliance (7) Others (2) No legislature (5)

List by ruling party
Ruling alliance/party	States/UT
National Democratic Alliance (22)
Bharatiya Janata Party	17
All India N.R. Congress	1
Naga People's Front	1
National People's Party	1
Sikkim Krantikari Morcha	1
Telugu Desam Party	1
Indian National Developmental Inclusive Alliance (7)
Indian National Congress	4
Jammu & Kashmir National Conference	1
Jharkhand Mukti Morcha	1
Tamilaga Vettri Kazhagam	1
Others (2)
Aam Aadmi Party	1
Zoram People's Movement	1

=== Defunct Assemblies ===
Assembly	Seat	Period active	Abolished by
Ajmer	Ajmer	1950–1956	States Reorganisation Act, 1956
Bhopal	Bhopal	1949–1956	States Reorganisation Act, 1956
Bombay	Bombay	1950–1960	Bombay Reorganisation Act, 1960
Coorg	Mercara	1950–1956	States Reorganisation Act, 1956
Hyderabad	Hyderabad	1948–1956	States Reorganisation Act, 1956
Madhya Bharat	Gwalior	1948–1956	States Reorganisation Act, 1956
Madras	Madras	1947–1969	Madras State (Alteration of Name) Act, 1968
Mysore	Mysore	1947–1973	Mysore State (Alteration of Name) Act of 1973
PEPSU	Patiala	1948–1956	States Reorganisation Act, 1956
Saurashtra	Rajkot	1948–1956	States Reorganisation Act, 1956
Travancore-Cochin	Trivandrum	1949–1956	States Reorganisation Act, 1956
Vindhya Pradesh	Rewa	1948–1956	States Reorganisation Act, 1956

== See also ==
- Central Legislative Assembly
- Lok Sabha
- Rajya Sabha
- State governments of India
- State Legislature
- List of Indian state legislative assembly elections
