= Hyderabad State Praja Party =

- Abbreviation: HSPP
- Founded: 1951; 75 years ago
- Dissolved: June 1951; 74 years ago
- Split from: Indian National Congress
- Merged into: Kisan Mazdoor Praja Party
- ECI Status: State Party

Hyderabad State Praja Party, a political party in the Hyderabad State. HSPP was formed in 1951 when Tanguturi Prakasam and Acharya N. G. Ranga broke away from the Indian National Congress.

In April 1951 Ranga broke away and formed the Krishikar Lok Party. In June the same year the HSPP of Prakasam merged with Kisan Mazdoor Praja Party.

== See also ==
- Indian National Congress breakaway parties
