= Berasia Assembly constituency =

Constituency of the Madhya Pradesh legislative assembly

Coordinates: 23.63°N 77.43°E

Berasia
- Constituency No. 149 for the Madhya Pradesh Legislative Assembly

Constituency details
- Country: India
- Region: Central India
- State: Madhya Pradesh
- District: Bhopal
- Lok Sabha constituency: Bhopal
- Established: 1951
- Reservation: SC

Member of Legislative Assembly
- 16th Madhya Pradesh Legislative Assembly
- Incumbent Vishnu Khatri
- Party: Bharatiya Janata Party
- Elected year: 2023
- Preceded by: Brahmanand Ratnakar

Berasia is one of the 230 constituencies in the Madhya Pradesh Legislative Assembly of Madhya Pradesh, a central state of India. Berasia is also part of the Bhopal Lok Sabha constituency. It is a reserved seat for the Scheduled Caste (SC).

== Members of the Legislative Assembly ==
=== Bhopal State Legislative Assembly ===
Year	Name	Party
1952	Shankar Dayal Sharma	Indian National Congress

=== Madhya Pradesh Legislative Assembly ===
Year	Name	Party
1957	Bhagwan Singh	Indian National Congress
1957	Hari Krishna Singh	Indian National Congress
1962	Bhaiya Lal	Hindu Mahasabha
1967	Laxminarayan Sharma	Bharatiya Jana Sangh
1972	Gauri Shankar Kaushal	Bharatiya Jana Sangh
1977	Gauri Shankar Kaushal	Janata Party
1980	Laxminarayan Sharma	Bharatiya Janata Party
1985	Laxminarayan Sharma	Bharatiya Janata Party
1990	Laxminarayan Sharma	Bharatiya Janata Party
1993	Laxminarayan Sharma	Bharatiya Janata Party
1998	Jodharam Gurjar	Indian National Congress
2003	Bhaktpal Singh	Bharatiya Janata Party
2008	Brahmanand Ratnakar	Bharatiya Janata Party
2013	Vishnu Khatri	Bharatiya Janata Party
2018	Vishnu Khatri	Bharatiya Janata Party
2023	Vishnu Khatri	Bharatiya Janata Party

== Election results ==
=== 2023 ===
2023 Madhya Pradesh Legislative Assembly election: Berasia
Party	Candidate	Votes	%	±%
BJP	Vishnu Khatri	107,844	54.65	+6.88
INC	Jayshree Harikaran	82,447	41.78	+2.47
BSP	Mastar Vishram Singh Ahirwar (Bouddh)	2,595	1.31	−0.65
NOTA	None of the above	1,829	0.93	−0.2
Majority		25,397	12.87	+4.41
Turnout		197,353	79.51	+2.34
BJP hold		Swing		

=== 2018 ===
2018 Madhya Pradesh Legislative Assembly election: Berasia
Party	Candidate	Votes	%	±%
BJP	Vishnu Khatri	77,814	47.77	
INC	Jayshree Harikaran	64,035	39.31	
Independent	Brahamanand Ratnakar	11,815	7.25	
BSP	Anita Ahirwar	3,199	1.96	
RLSP	Toran Singh Ahirwar	1,540	0.95	
NOTA	None of the above	1,835	1.13	
Majority		13,779	8.46	
Turnout		162,905	77.17	
BJP gain from		Swing		

== See also ==
- Berasia
- List of constituencies of Madhya Pradesh Legislative Assembly
- Bhopal
