= Karondiya =

- village
- Location within Madhya Pradesh Location within India
- Coordinates: 23.4319023°N 77.3410569°E
- Country: India
- State: Madhya Pradesh
- District: Bhopal
- Tehsil: Berasia
- Elevation: 505 m (1,657 ft)

Population (2011)
  - Total: 1,510
- Time zone: UTC+5:30 (IST)
- ISO 3166 code: MP-IN
- 2011 census code: 482300

Karondiya is a village in the Bhopal district of Madhya Pradesh, India. It is located in the Berasia tehsil.

== Demographics ==
According to the 2011 census of India, Karondiya has 315 households. The effective literacy rate (i.e. the literacy rate of population excluding children aged 6 and below) is 85.83%.

Demographics (2011 Census)
	Total	Male	Female
Population	1510	784	726
Children aged below 6 years	183	107	76
Scheduled caste	755	383	372
Scheduled tribe	0	0	0
Literates	1139	624	515
Workers (all)	716	371	345
Main workers (total)	711	370	341
Main workers: Cultivators	229	124	105
Main workers: Agricultural labourers	420	211	209
Main workers: Household industry workers	4	2	2
Main workers: Other	58	33	25
Marginal workers (total)	5	1	4
Marginal workers: Cultivators	1	0	1
Marginal workers: Agricultural labourers	2	1	1
Marginal workers: Household industry workers	0	0	0
Marginal workers: Others	2	0	2
Non-workers	794	413	381
