= Arif Beg =

Bharatiya Janata Party leader (1935–2016)

Arif Beg (1935–2016) was a Bharatiya Janata Party (BJP) leader. He hailed from Indore in Madhya Pradesh state. His father, Qaramat 'Pahalwan' Baig, had reached Indore from Afghanistan.

== Political career ==
He was an Indian Union Minister (1977–1980). He was a Union Minister of Prime Minister of India Morarji Desai's government. Also he was a cabinet minister in the government of Madhya Pradesh Chief Minister Govind Narayan Singh. He was the youngest minister in the cabinet at that time (1967–1969), and after being released from jail in emergency, he contested the Bhopal Lok Sabha as a rashtriya Lok Dal candidate in the general election. He defeated senior Congress leader Shankar Dayal Sharma by a margin of 109,000 votes, and later Shankar Dayal Sharma became the President of India. He was also elected a Member of Parliament from Betul Lok Sabha of Madhya Pradesh state in the 1989 Lok Sabha election, when he defeated Congress candidate Aslam Sher Khan. He has been a member of the Bharatiya Jan Sangh and a founding member of the Bharatiya Janata Party, has been the National Vice President of the BJP Chief Executive, as well as has held many important positions. He has the distinction of being the founder National President of the Bharatiya Janata Party Minority Front.

Arif Beg (or Arif Baig) started his electoral journey when he was elected to Madhya Pradesh vidhan sabha in 1967 from Indore as a socialist. His half-brother Bala Baig was also a well-known figure in Indore, who spent 3 years in jail in 1990s for a host of illegal activities. Arif Beg soon joined Jana Sangh in 1973, as one of its earliest Muslim faces, who was later eclipsed in prominence when Sikander Bakht joined BJP in 1980. He was jailed during Emergency with other leaders of Jana Sangh, like Kushabhau Thakre.

In 1977 he was elected to Lok Sabha from Bhopal as Janata Party candidate. He lost from Bhopal in 1980 on Janata Party's ticket, and from Khandwa in 1984 on BJP's ticket. In 1989 he was elected to the Lok Sabha from Betul constituency as BJP's candidate. With Sikander Bakht becoming the most prominent Muslim in BJP, Arif Beg left the party in 1996, but he returned to it in 2003. He contested Bhopal again in 1998 but for Congress, and lost this time to BJP's Sushil Chandra Varma. He fought his last electoral battle in 2013 when, back in BJP by now, he was its losing candidate in 2013 Madhya Pradesh Vidhan Sabha election from Bhopal North seat, from where Arif Aqueel of Congress won.

== Death ==
Arif Beg died on 5 September 2016, in Bhopal at the age of 81.

== See also ==
- Sikander Bakht
- Farooq Khan
