= Bhopal State (1949–1956) =

Coordinates: 23°15′N 77°24′E

- Former State 1949–1956
- Etymology: from Bhojpal or Bhoj's dam
- Location of Bhopal State in India
- Country: India
- Region: Central India
- Before was: Bhopal State
- Formation: 1 June 1949
- Admission to union: 1 June 1949
- Dissolution: 1956 (by States Reorganisation Act, 1956)
- Capital and largest city: Bhopal

Government
  - Chief minister
  - 20 March 1952 – 31 October 1956: Shankar Dayal Sharma (First and Last)

Area
  - Total: 17,801 km^{2} (6,873 sq mi)

Population (1931)
  - Total: 7,300,000
- Time zone: UTC+05:30 (IST)
Preceded by	Succeeded by
Bhopal State	Madhya Pradesh

Bhopal was a state of India, which existed from 1949 to 1956. The state evolved out of the princely state of Bhopal, and was merged with neighbouring states to form Madhya Pradesh in 1956. Shankar Dayal Sharma of the Indian National Congress served as chief minister of Bhopal state from 1952 to 1956.

== History ==
Before the independence of India the princely state of Bhopal was ruled by the hereditary Nawabs. As a result of the Indian Independence Act 1947, the princely states were released from their treaty obligations to the British and were left to decide whether to join one of the new dominions of India and Pakistan. In March 1948, the last Nawab expressed his wish to rule Bhopal as an independent state. However, agitations against his rule broke out in December 1948, leading to the arrest of prominent leaders including Shankar Dayal Sharma. On 23 January 1949, Sharma was sentenced to eight months' imprisonment for violating restrictions on public meetings; some other satyagrahis were also arrested. Later, the political detainees were released and on 14th August 1947 the Nawab signed an Instrument of Accession to the Dominion of India. The state of Bhopal was taken over by the Union Government of India on 1 June 1949 and was declared a "Part C" state, to be governed by a Chief Commissioner appointed by the President of India.

=== Disestablishment ===
According to the States Reorganisation Act of 1956, Bhopal state was integrated into the state of Madhya Pradesh, and Bhopal was declared as the capital of the newly formed state.

== Geography ==
The Bhopal state included the present-day districts of Bhopal, Raisen, and Sehore.

== Government ==
The Indian National Congress won the first elections for Legislative Assembly and Parliament, held in 1952. The composition of the 30-member Bhopal State Assembly was:

- 25 – Indian National Congress
- 1 – Hindu Mahasabha
- 4 – Independent

Shankar Dayal Sharma (19 August 1918 – 26 December 1999) was sworn in as the first (and the only) Chief Minister of the state on 20 March 1952. He was the youngest Chief Minister in India at the time.

== See also ==
- Political integration of India
- States Reorganisation Act
