= Huzur Assembly constituency =

Constituency of the Madhya Pradesh legislative assembly in India

Coordinates: 23.239°N 77.282°E

Huzur
- Constituency No. 155 for the Madhya Pradesh Legislative Assembly

Constituency details
- Country: India
- Region: Central India
- State: Madhya Pradesh
- District: Bhopal
- Lok Sabha constituency: Bhopal
- Established: 2008
- Reservation: None

Member of Legislative Assembly
- 16th Madhya Pradesh Legislative Assembly
- Incumbent Rameshwar Sharma
- Party: Bharatiya Janata Party
- Elected year: 2023
- Preceded by: Jitendra Daga

Huzur is one of the 230 assembly constituencies of Madhya Pradesh. It is a part of Bhopal district and came into existence in 2008 after the passing of the Delimitation of Parliamentary and Assembly Constituencies Order, 2008. As of 2023, it is represented by Rameshwar Sharma of the Bharatiya Janata Party.

== Members of the Legislative Assembly ==
Year	Member	Party
2008	Jitendra Daga	Bharatiya Janata Party
2013	Rameshwar Sharma	Bharatiya Janata Party
2018	Rameshwar Sharma	Bharatiya Janata Party
2023	Rameshwar Sharma	Bharatiya Janata Party

== Election results ==
=== 2023 ===
2023 Madhya Pradesh Legislative Assembly election: Huzur
Party	Candidate	Votes	%	±%
BJP	Rameshwar Sharma	177,755	67.31	+15.96
INC	Naresh Gyanchandani	79,845	30.23	−13.59
NOTA	None of the above	2,135	0.81	−0.44
Majority		97,910	37.08	+29.55
Turnout		264,100	71.16	+0.66
BJP hold		Swing		

=== 2018 ===
2018 Madhya Pradesh Legislative Assembly election: Huzur
Party	Candidate	Votes	%	±%
BJP	Rameshwar Sharma	107,288	51.35	
INC	Naresh Gyanchandani	91,563	43.82	
BSP	D.K.Siraswal	2,316	1.11	
NOTA	None of the above	2,605	1.25	
Majority		15,725	7.53	
Turnout		208,944	70.5	

== See also ==
- Bhopal district
- List of constituencies of the Madhya Pradesh Legislative Assembly
