= 2024 Indian general election in Madhya Pradesh =

Election to constitute the 18th Lok Sabha in 2024 in Madhya Pradesh

- 19 April - 13 May 2024

All 29 Madhya Pradesh seats in the Lok Sabha
- Opinion polls
- Turnout: 68.29% (▼4.91%)
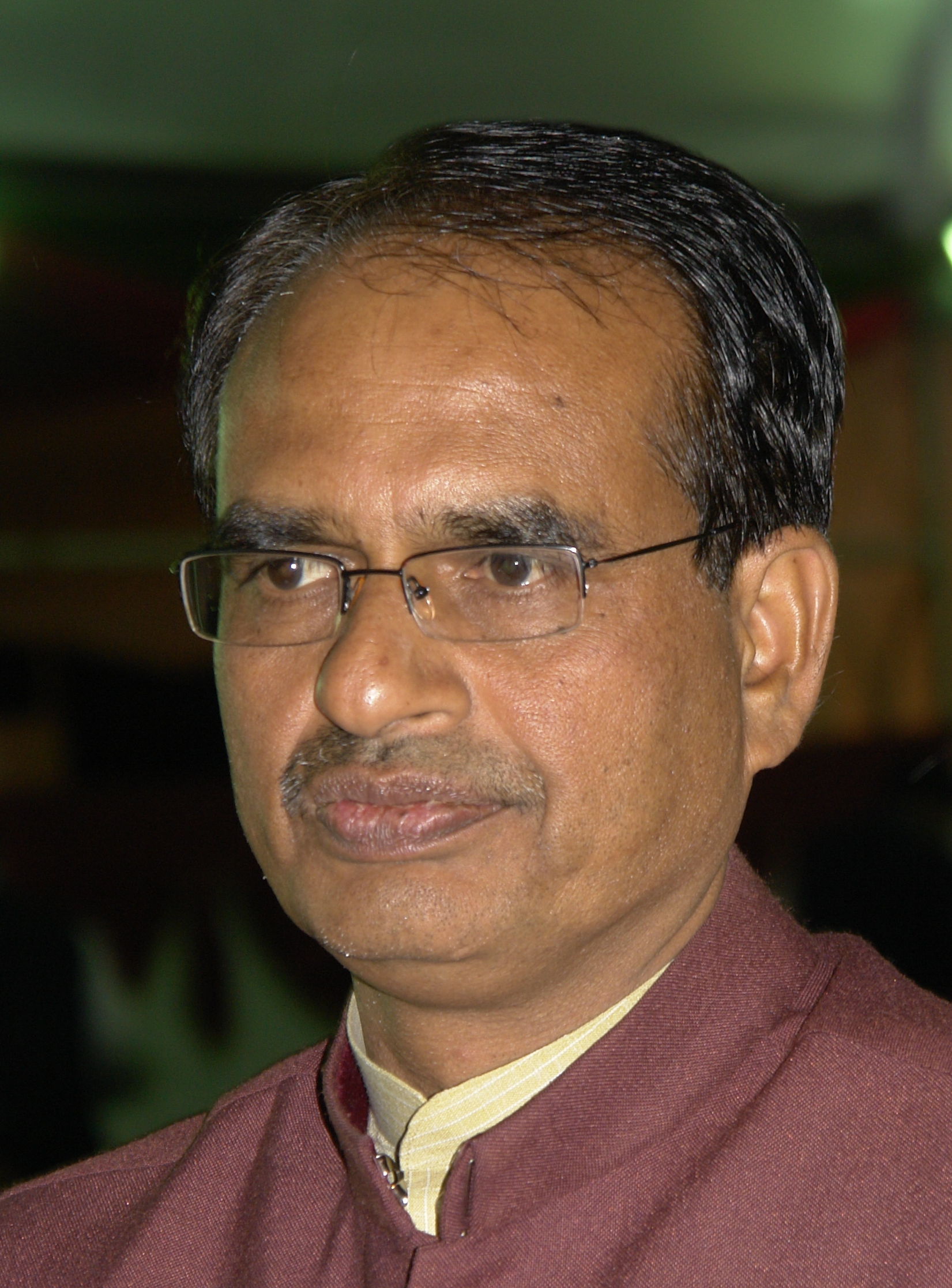

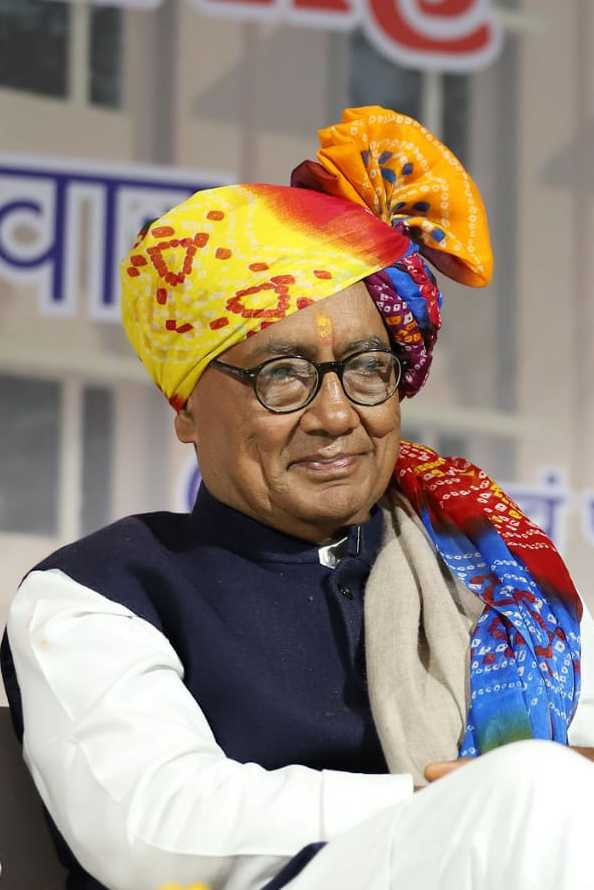
	First party	Second party
Leader	Shivraj Singh Chauhan	Digvijaya Singh
Party	BJP	INC
Alliance	NDA	INDIA
Leader since	2005	2023
Leader's seat	Vidisha	Rajgarh (lost)
Last election	58.0%, 28 seats	34.73%, 1 seat
Seats before	28	1
Seats won	29	0
Seat change	▲1	▼1
Popular vote	22,490,851	12,308,049
Percentage	60.13%	32.90%
Swing	▲1.27%	▼2.06%
Prime Minister before election
Narendra Modi
BJP
Elected Prime Minister
Narendra Modi
BJP

The 2024 Indian general election was held in Madhya Pradesh in four phases between 19 April and 13 May 2024 to elect 29 members of the 18th Lok Sabha. The Bharatiya Janata Party clean swept the state, winning all the 29 seats.

== Election schedule ==
On 16 March 2024, the Election Commission of India announced the schedule for the 2024 Indian general election, with Madhya Pradesh scheduled to vote during the first four phases on 19, 26 April, 7 and 13 May.

Schedule of 2024 Indian general election in Madhya Pradesh, along with the voter turnout for each phase. Phase 1 Phase 2 Phase 3 Phase 4

Poll event	Phase			
Poll event	I	II	III	IV
Notification date	20 March	28 March	12 April	18 April
Last date for filing nomination	27 March	4 April	19 April	25 April
Scrutiny of nomination	28 March	5 April	20 April	26 April
Last Date for withdrawal of nomination	30 March	8 April	22 April	29 April
Date of poll	19 April	26 April	7 May	13 May
Date of counting of votes/Result	4 June 2024			
No. of constituencies	6	6	9	8

== Parties and alliances ==
=== National Democratic Alliance ===
National Democratic Alliance

Party	Flag	Symbol	Leader	Seats contested
Bharatiya Janata Party			Shivraj Singh Chauhan	29

=== Indian National Developmental Inclusive Alliance ===
Indian National Developmental Inclusive Alliance

Party	Flag	Symbol	Leader	Seats contested
Indian National Congress			Jitu Patwari	27 (Note: INC urged voters in Indore to press the NOTA option after its candidate Akshay Kanti Bam withdrew his nomination and joined the BJP, leaving the party without a contestant for the first time in 35 years. However, the NOTA votes did not affect the election outcome, as the BJP's candidate won with huge margin.)
All India Forward Bloc			Raja Bhaiya Prajapati	1 (Note: The Congress and Samajwadi Party have extended their support to All India Forward Bloc candidate R. B. Prajapati as the official INDIA bloc candidate for the Khajuraho Lok Sabha seat, after the SP's original nominee Meera Yadav had her nomination rejected over alleged "irregularities." The BJP has fielded its state president V. D. Sharma from the seat and eventually he won the seat.)
Total				28

=== Others ===
Party	Flag	Symbol	Leader	Seats contested
Bahujan Samaj Party			Ramakant Pippal	29
Gondwana Ganatantra Party			Tuleshwar Singh Markam	9
Socialist Unity Centre of India (Communist)				6
Bharat Adivasi Party			Mohan Lal Roat	5
Rashtriya Samaj Paksha				4
Communist Party of India				3
Republican Party of India (Athawale)				3
Bahujan Mukti Party				1

== Candidates ==
Constituency					
Constituency		NDA		INDIA	
1	Morena	BJP	Shivmangal Singh Tomar	INC	Satyapal Singh Sikarwar
2	Bhind (SC)	BJP	Sandhya Ray	INC	Phool Singh Baraiya
3	Gwalior	BJP	Bharat Singh Kushwah	INC	Praveen Pathak
4	Guna	BJP	Jyotiraditya Scindia	INC	Rao Yadvendra Singh
5	Sagar	BJP	Lata Wankhede	INC	Guddu Raja Bundela
6	Tikamgarh (SC)	BJP	Virendra Kumar Khatik	INC	Pankaj Ahirwar
7	Damoh	BJP	Rahul Lodhi	INC	Tarvar Singh Lodhi
8	Khajuraho	BJP	V. D. Sharma	AIFB	RB Prajapati
9	Satna	BJP	Ganesh Singh	INC	Siddharth Sukhlal Kushwaha
10	Rewa	BJP	Janardan Mishra	INC	Nilam Mishra
11	Sidhi	BJP	Rajesh Mishra	INC	Kamleshwar Patel
12	Shahdol (ST)	BJP	Himadri Singh	INC	Phundelal Singh Marko
13	Jabalpur	BJP	Ashish Dubey	INC	Dinesh Yadav
14	Mandla (ST)	BJP	Faggan Singh Kulaste	INC	Omkar Singh Markam
15	Balaghat	BJP	Bharti Pardhi	INC	Samrat Saraswat
16	Chhindwara	BJP	Vivek Bunty Sahu	INC	Nakul Nath
17	Hoshangabad	BJP	Darshan Singh Choudhary	INC	Sanjay Sharma
18	Vidisha	BJP	Shivraj Singh Chouhan	INC	Pratap Bhanu Sharma
19	Bhopal	BJP	Alok Sharma	INC	Arun Shrivastav
20	Rajgarh	BJP	Rodmal Nagar	INC	Digvijaya Singh
21	Dewas (SC)	BJP	Mahendra Solanki	INC	Rajendra Malviya
22	Ujjain (SC)	BJP	Anil Firojiya	INC	Mahesh Parmar
23	Mandsaur	BJP	Sudhir Gupta	INC	Dilip Singh Gurjar
24	Ratlam (ST)	BJP	Anita Nagar Singh Chouhan	INC	Kantilal Bhuria
25	Dhar (ST)	BJP	Savitri Thakur	INC	Radheshyam Muvel
26	Indore	BJP	Shankar Lalwani	NOTA	
27	Khargone	BJP	Gajendra Patel	INC	Porlal Kharte
28	Khandwa	BJP	Gyaneswar Patil	INC	Narendra Patel
29	Betul (ST)	BJP	Durga Das Uikey	INC	Ramu Tekam

== Surveys and polls ==
=== Opinion polls ===
Polling agency	Date published	Margin of error				Lead
Polling agency	Date published	Margin of error	NDA	INDIA	Others	Lead
ABP News-CVoter	April 2024	±3-5%	28	1	0	NDA
ABP News-CVoter	March 2024	±5%	28	1	0	NDA
India Today-CVoter	February 2024	±3-5%	27	2	0	NDA
ABP News-CVoter	December 2023	±3-5%	27-29	0-2	0	NDA
Times Now-ETG	December 2023	±3%	27-29	0-1	0	NDA
India TV-CNX	October 2023	±3%	25	4	0	NDA
Times Now-ETG	September 2023	±3%	25-27	2-4	0	NDA
Times Now-ETG	August 2023	±3%	24-26	3-5	0	NDA

Polling agency	Date published	Margin of error				Lead
Polling agency	Date published	Margin of error	NDA	INDIA	Others	Lead
ABP News-CVoter	April 2024	±3-5%	53%	43.3%	3.7%	9.7
ABP News-CVoter	March 2024	±5%	57.9%	40.8%	1.3%	17.1
India Today-CVoter	February 2024	±3-5%	58%	38%	4%	20
India Today-CVoter	August 2023	±3-5%	48%	41%	11%	7

=== Exit polls ===
Polling agency				Lead
Polling agency	NDA	INDIA	Others	Lead
TV9 Bharatvarsh- People's Insight - Polstrat	29	0	0	NDA
Actual results	29	0	0	NDA

== Voter turnout ==
=== Phase wise ===
Phase	Poll date	Constituencies	Voter turnout (%)
I	19 April 2024	Sidhi (ST), Shahdol, Jabalpur, Mandla (ST), Balaghat, Chhindwara	67.75%
II	26 April 2024	Tikamgarh (SC), Damoh, Khajuraho, Satna, Rewa, Hoshangabad	58.59%
III	7 May 2024	Sagar, Morena, Bhind (SC), Gwalior, Guna, Vidisha, Bhopal, Rajgarh, Betul (ST)	66.75%
IV	13 May 2024	Dewas (SC), Ujjain (SC), Mandsour, Ratlam (ST), Dhar (ST), Indore, Khargone, Khandwa	72.05%
Total			68.29%

=== Constituency wise ===
Constituency		Poll date	Turnout	Swing
1	Morena	7 May 2024	58.97%	2.99%▼
2	Bhind (SC)	7 May 2024	54.93%	0.4%▲
3	Gwalior	7 May 2024	62.13%	2.31%▲
4	Guna	7 May 2024	72.43%	2.09%▲
5	Sagar	26 April 2024	65.75%	0.21%▲
6	Tikamgarh (SC)	26 April 2024	60.00%	6.62%▼
7	Damoh	26 April 2024	56.48%	9.35%▼
8	Khajuraho	26 April 2024	56.97%	11.34%▼
9	Satna	26 April 2024	61.94%	8.77%▼
10	Rewa	26 April 2024	49.43%	10.48%▼
11	Sidhi	19 April 2024	56.50%	13%▼
12	Shahdol (ST)	19 April 2024	64.68%	10.09%▼
13	Jabalpur	19 April 2024	61.00%	8.46%▼
14	Mandla (ST)	19 April 2024	72.84%	4.95%▼
15	Balaghat	19 April 2024	73.45%	4.21%▼
16	Chhindwara	19 April 2024	79.83%	2.59%▼
17	Hoshangabad	26 April 2024	67.21%	7.01%▼
18	Vidisha	7 May 2024	74.48%	2.65%▲
19	Bhopal	7 May 2024	64.06%	1.68%▼
20	Rajgarh	7 May 2024	76.04%	1.62%▲
21	Dewas (SC)	13 May 2024	75.48%	4.03%▼
22	Ujjain (SC)	13 May 2024	73.82%	1.61%▼
23	Mandsaur	13 May 2024	75.27%	2.62%▼
24	Ratlam (ST)	13 May 2024	72.94%	2.76%▼
25	Dhar (ST)	13 May 2024	72.76%	2.5%▼
26	Indore	13 May 2024	61.67%	7.66%▼
27	Khargone	13 May 2024	76.03%	1.82%▼
28	Khandwa	13 May 2024	71.52%	5.38%▼
29	Betul (ST)	7 May 2024	73.48%	4.7%▼

== Results ==
=== Results by alliance or party ===
Alliance/ Party		Popular vote			Seats		
Alliance/ Party		Votes	%	±pp	Contested	Won	+/−
NDA	BJP	22,490,851	60.13	▲2.13	29	29	▲1
INDIA	INC	12,308,049	32.90	▼1.60	28	0	▼1
INDIA	AIFB	50,215	0.13	▲0.12	1	0	Steady
INDIA	Total	12,358,264	33.03		29	0	▼1
BSP		1,085,346	2.39	-	29	0	-
Others		1,415,619	3.78		149	0	
IND		608,107	1.63		161	0	
NOTA		533,705	1.43				
Total			100%	-		29	-

=== Results by constituency ===
Constituency			Winner				Runner Up				Margin
#	Name	Poll %	Candidate	Party	Votes	%	Candidate	Party	Votes	%	Margin
1	Morena	58.97▼	Shivmangal Singh Tomar	BJP	515,477	43.41	Neetu Satyapal Singh Sikarwar	INC	462,947	38.99	52,530
2	Bhind (SC)	54.93▲	Sandhya Ray	BJP	537,065	51.20	Phool Singh Baraiya	INC	472,225	45.02	64,840
3	Gwalior	62.13▲	Bharat Singh Kushwah	BJP	671,535	49.99	Praveen Pathak	INC	601,325	44.77	70,210
4	Guna	72.43▲	Jyotiraditya Scindia	BJP	923,302	67.21	Rao Yadvendra Singh	INC	382,373	27.83	540,929
5	Sagar	65.75▲	Lata Wankhede	BJP	787,979	68.49	Chandra Bhusan Singh Bundela	INC	316,757	27.53	471,222
6	Tikamgarh (SC)	60.00▼	Virendra Kumar Khatik	BJP	715,050	65.10	Khuman Urf Pankaj Ahirwar	INC	311,738	28.38	403,312
7	Damoh	56.48▼	Rahul Singh Lodhi	BJP	709,768	65.18	Tarbar Singh Lodhi	INC	303,342	27.86	406,426
8	Khajuraho	56.97▼	Vishnu Datt Sharma	BJP	772,774	67.75	Kamlesh Kumar	BSP	231,545	20.30	541,229
9	Satna	61.94▼	Ganesh Singh	BJP	459,728	43.41	Siddharth Sukhlal Kushwaha	INC	374,779	35.39	84,949
10	Rewa	49.43▼	Janardan Mishra	BJP	477,459	52.00	Neelam Abhay Mishra	INC	284,085	30.94	193,374
11	Sidhi	56.50▼	Rajesh Mishra	BJP	583,559	50.87	Kamleshwar Indrajit Kumar	INC	377,143	32.87	206,416
12	Shahdol (ST)	64.68▼	Himadri Singh	BJP	711,143	61.73	Phundelal Singh Marko	INC	313,803	27.24	397,340
13	Jabalpur	61.00▼	Ashish Dubey	BJP	790,133	68.20	Dinesh Yadav	INC	303,459	26.19	486,674
14	Mandla (ST)	72.84▼	Faggan Singh Kulaste	BJP	751,375	48.93	Omkar Singh Markam	INC	647,529	42.17	103,846
15	Balaghat	73.45▼	Bharti Pardhi	BJP	712,660	51.56	Samrat Ashok Singh Saraswar	INC	538,148	38.93	174,512
16	Chhindwara	79.83▼	Bunty Vivek Sahu	BJP	644,738	49.41	Nakul Kamal Nath	INC	531,120	40.70	113,618
17	Hoshangabad	67.21▼	Darshan Singh Choudhary	BJP	812,147	64.99	Sanjay Sharma Sanju Bhaiya	INC	313,803	30.44	431,696
18	Vidisha	74.48▲	Shivraj Singh Chouhan	BJP	1,116,460	76.70	Pratap Bhanu Sharma	INC	295,052	27.24	821,408
19	Bhopal	64.06▼	Alok Sharma	BJP	981,109	65.48	Advocate Arun Shrivastava	INC	479,610	32.01	501,499
20	Rajgarh	76.04▲	Rodmal Nagar	BJP	758,743	53.10	Digvijaya Singh	INC	612,654	42.87	146,089
21	Dewas (SC)	75.48▼	Mahendra Singh Solanky	BJP	928,941	63.23	Rajendra Radhakishan Malviya	INC	503,716	34.29	425,225
22	Ujjain (SC)	73.82▼	Anil Firojiya	BJP	836,104	62.93	Mahesh Parmar	INC	460,244	34.64	375,860
23	Mandsaur	75.27▼	Sudheer Gupta	BJP	945,761	65.98	Dilip Singh Gurjar	INC	445,106	31.05	500,655
24	Ratlam (ST)	72.94▼	Anita Nagarsingh Chouhan	BJP	795,863	51.93	Kantilal Bhuria	INC	588,631	38.41	207,232
25	Dhar (ST)	72.76▼	Savitri Thakur	BJP	794,449	55.75	Radheshyam Muvel	INC	575,784	40.40	218,665
26	Indore	61.67▼	Shankar Lalwani	BJP	1,226,751	78.54	None	NOTA	218,674	14.00	1,008,077
27	Khargone	76.03▼	Gajendra Singh Patel	BJP	819,863	52.60	Porlal Batha Kharte	INC	684,845	43.93	135,018
28	Khandwa	71.52▼	Gyaneswar Patil	BJP	862,679	57.04	Narendra Patel	INC	592,708	39.19	269,971
29	Betul (ST)	73.48▼	Durga Das Uikey	BJP	848,236	60.76	Ramu Tekam	INC	468,475	33.56	379,761

== Assembly segments wise lead of Parties ==
2024 Madhya Pradesh Lok Sabha Elections Assembly Wise Map

Party	Assembly segments	Position in Assembly (as of 2023 election)
Bharatiya Janata Party	207	163
Indian National Congress	23	66
Bharat Adivasi Party	0	1
Total	230	

== See also ==
- 2024 Indian general election in Maharashtra
- 2024 Indian general election in Manipur
- 2024 Indian general election in Meghalaya
