= 2019 Indian general election in Madhya Pradesh =

Indian lower house election in Madhya state

- 29 April 2019; 6,12,19 May 2019

29 seats
- Turnout: 71.20% (▲9.59%)
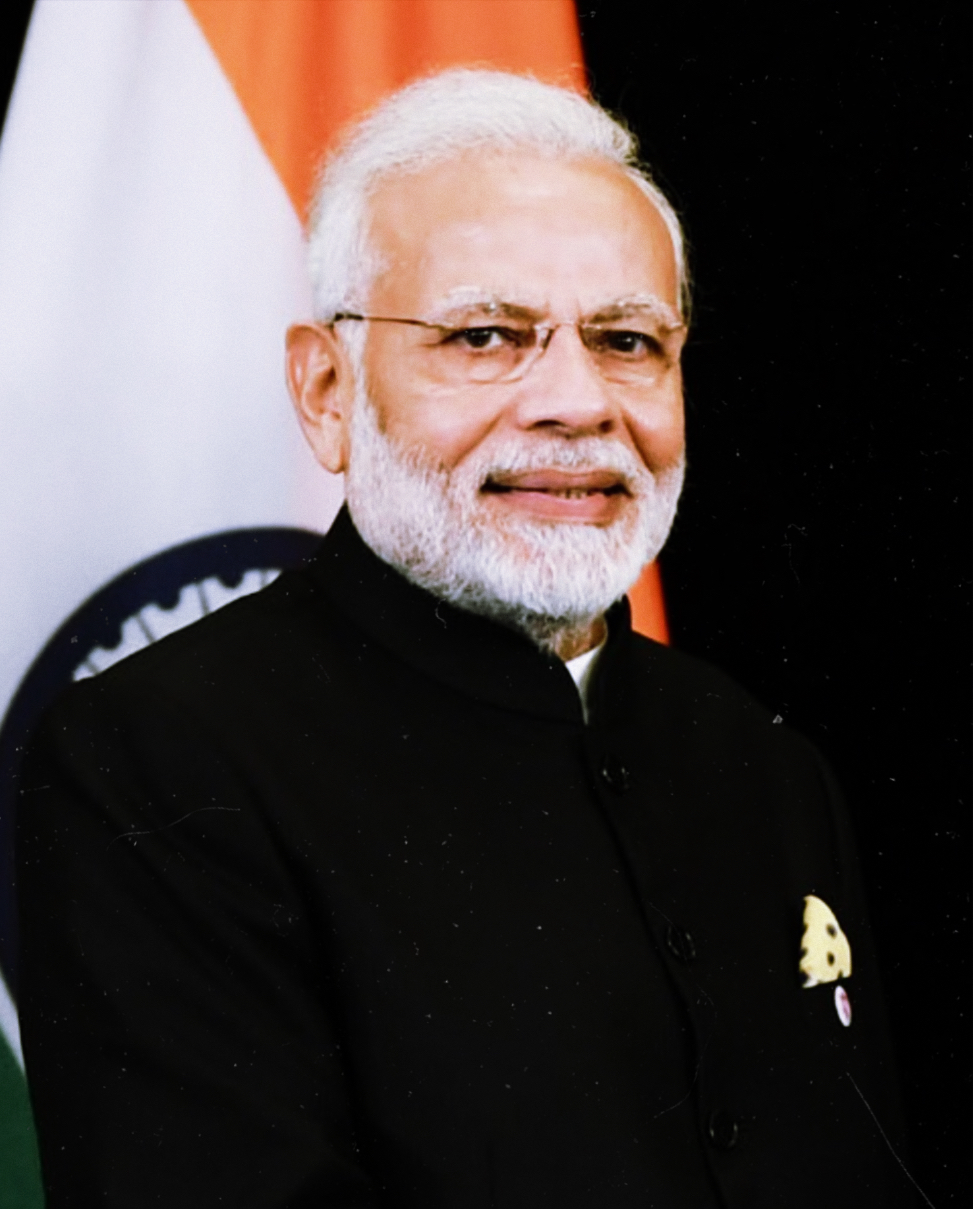

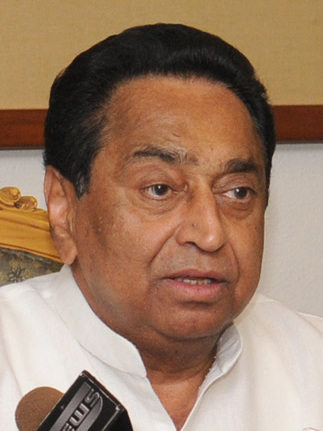

	First party	Second party	Third party
Party	BJP	INC	BSP
Last election	27	2	0
Seats won	28	1	0
Seat change	▲1	▼1	0
Percentage	58%	34.5%	2.5%
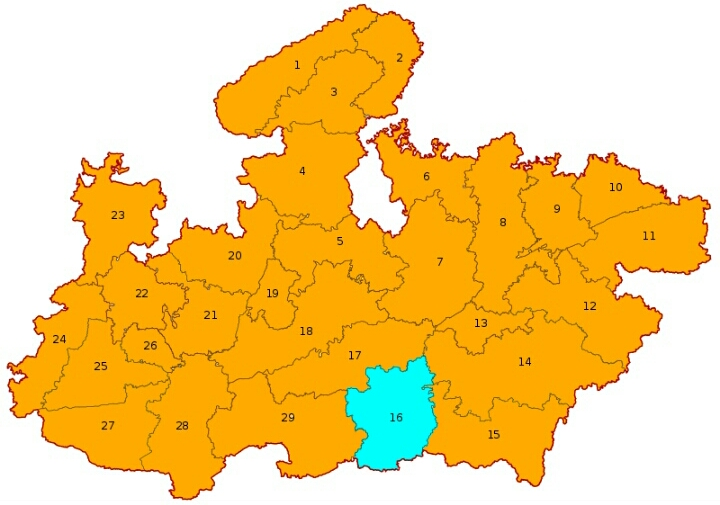
- Madhya Pradesh
Prime Minister before election
Narendra Modi
BJP
Prime Minister after election
Narendra Modi
BJP

The 2019 Indian general election were held in Madhya Pradesh in 4 phases- between 29 April and 19 May 2019 to constitute the 17th Lok Sabha. Results declared on 23 May 2019.

== Parties and alliances ==
=== National Democratic Alliance ===
Party	Flag	Symbol	Leader	Seats contested
Bharatiya Janata Party			Shivraj Singh Chouhan	29

=== United Progressive Alliance ===
Party	Flag	Symbol	Leader	Seats contested
Indian National Congress			Kamal Nath	29

=== BSP+SP ===
Party	flag	Symbol	Leader	Seats contested
Bahujan Samaj Party			Mayawati	25
Samajwadi Party			Akhilesh Yadav	3

== Candidates ==
Constituency		BJP		INC		BSP + SP	
#	Name	Party	Candidate	Party	Candidate	Party	Candidate
1	Morena	BJP	Narendra Singh Tomar	INC	Ramnivas Rawat	BSP	Kartar Singh Bhadana
2	Bhind (SC)	BJP	Sandhya Rai	INC	Devasish Jararia	BSP	Babu Ram Jamor
3	Gwalior	BJP	Vivek Shejwalkar	INC	Ashok Singh	BSP	Mamta Balveer Kushwaha
4	Guna	BJP	K. P. Yadav	INC	Jyotiraditya Scindia	BSP	Lokendra Singh Rajpoot
5	Sagar	BJP	Raj Bahadur Singh	INC	Prabhu Singh Thakur	BSP	Rajkumar Yadav
6	Tikamgarh	BJP	Virendra Kumar Khatik	INC	Kiran Ahirwar	SP	R. D. Prajapati
7	Damoh (ST)	BJP	Prahlad Patel	INC	Pratap Singh Lodhi	BSP	Jittu Khare "Badal"
8	Khajuraho	BJP	Vishnu Datt Sharma	INC	Kavita Singh	SP	Veer Singh Patel
9	Satna	BJP	Ganesh Singh	INC	Raja Ram Tripathi	BSP	Acche Lal Kushawaha
10	Rewa	BJP	Janardan Mishra	INC	Siddharth Tiwari	BSP	Vikash Singh Patel
11	Sidhi	BJP	Riti Pathak	INC	Ajay Singh Rahul	BSP	Ram Lal Panika
12	Shahdol (ST)	BJP	Himadri Singh	INC	Pramila Singh	BSP	Mohadal Singh Pav
13	Jabalpur	BJP	Rakesh Singh	INC	Vivek Tankha	BSP	Ramraj Ram
14	Mandla (ST)	BJP	Faggan Singh Kulaste	INC	Kamal Maravi		
15	Balaghat	BJP	Dhal Singh Bisen	INC	Madhu Bhagat	BSP	Kankar Munjare
16	Chhindwara	BJP	Natthan Shah	INC	Nakul Nath	BSP	Gyaneshwar Gajbhiye
17	Narmadapuram	BJP	Uday Pratap Singh	INC	Shailendra Diwan	BSP	M. P. Choudhary
18	Vidisha	BJP	Ramakant Bhargav	INC	Shailendra Patel	BSP	Geetawali P. S. Ahirwar
19	Bhopal	BJP	Pragya Singh Thakur	INC	Digvijaya Singh	BSP	Madho Singh Ahirwar
20	Rajgarh	BJP	Rodmal Nagar	INC	Mona Sustani		
21	Dewas (SC)	BJP	Mahendra Solanki	INC	Prahlad Tipaniya	BSP	Badrilal "Akela"
22	Ujjain (SC)	BJP	Anil Firojiya	INC	Babulal Malviya	BSP	Satish Parmar
23	Mandsour	BJP	Sudhir Gupta	INC	Meenakshi Natarajan	BSP	Prabhulal Meghwal
24	Ratlam (ST)	BJP	Guman Singh Damor	INC	Kantilal Bhuria	BSP	Madhu Singh Patel
25	Dhar (ST)	BJP	Chhatar Singh Darbar	INC	Dinesh Girwal	BSP	Gulsingh Kawache
26	Indore	BJP	Shankar Lalwani	INC	Pankaj Sanghvi	BSP	Deepchand Ahirwal
27	Khargone	BJP	Gajendra Patel	INC	Govind Muzaalda	BSP	Amit Kumar Balke
28	Khandwa	BJP	Nandkumar Chouhan	INC	Arun Yadav	BSP	Dayaram Korku
29	Betul (ST)	BJP	Durgadas Uike	INC	Ramu Tekam	BSP	Ashok Bhalavi

== Results ==
Bharatiya Janata Party swept the state winning 28 out of 29 Seats and the Indian National Congress only won one seat.

=== Results by Party ===
Party Name	Popular vote			Seats		
Party Name	Votes	%	±pp	Contested	Won	+/−
BJP	2,14,06,911	58.00		29	28	
INC	1,27,33,074	34.50		29	1	
BSP	8,78,013	2.38		25	0	
SP	82,662	0.22		2	0	
Others	7,69,818	2.09	Steady	176	0	Steady
IND	7,02,229	1.90		178	0	Steady
NOTA	3,40,984	0.92	Steady	29	Steady	Steady
Total	3,69,10,610	100%	-	439	29	-

=== Constituency-wise results ===
Keys: BJP (28) INC (1)

Constituency		Turnout	Winner				Runner-up				Margin
No.	Name	Turnout	Candidate	Party	Votes	%	Candidate	Party	Votes	%	Margin
1	Morena	61.96 ▲	Narendra Singh Tomar	BJP	5,41,689	47.57	Ramniwas Rawat	INC	4,28,348	37.62	1,13,341
2	Bhind (SC)	54.53 ▲	Sandhya Rai	BJP	5,27,694	54.81	Devashish	INC	3,27,809	34.05	1,99,885
3	Gwalior	59.82 ▲	Vivek Shejwalkar	BJP	6,27,250	52.41	Ashok Singh	INC	4,80,408	40.14	1,46,842
4	Guna	70.34 ▲	Dr. K.P. Yadav	BJP	6,14,049	52.1	Jyotiraditya Scindia	INC	4,88,500	41.44	1,25,549
5	Sagar	65.54 ▲	Raj Bahadur Singh	BJP	6,46,231	62.29	Prabhu Singh Thakur	INC	3,40,689	32.84	3,05,542
6	Tikamgarh (SC)	66.62 ▲	Virendra Kumar	BJP	6,72,248	61.26	Kiran Ahirwar	INC	3,24,189	29.54	3,48,059
7	Damoh	65.83 ▲	Prahlad Singh Patel	BJP	7,04,524	60.51	Pratap Singh Lodhi	INC	3,51,113	30.15	3,53,411
8	Khajuraho	68.31 ▲	Vishnu Datt Sharma	BJP	8,11,135	64.46	Kavita Singh	INC	3,18,753	25.33	4,92,382
9	Satna	70.71 ▲	Ganesh Singh	BJP	5,88,753	52.86	Rajaram Tripathi	INC	3,57,280	32.08	2,31,473
10	Rewa	60.41 ▲	Janardan Mishra	BJP	5,83,769	57.54	Siddharth Tiwari	INC	2,70,961	26.71	3,12,807
11	Sidhi	69.50 ▲	Riti Pathak	BJP	6,98,342	54.44	Ajay Singh	INC	4,11,818	32.11	2,86,524
12	Shahdol (ST)	74.77 ▲	Himadri Singh	BJP	7,47,977	60.39	Pramila Singh	INC	3,44,644	27.83	4,03,333
13	Jabalpur	69.46 ▲	Rakesh Singh	BJP	8,26,454	65.38	Vivek Tankha	INC	3,71,710	29.41	4,54,744
14	Mandla (ST)	77.79 ▲	Faggan Singh Kulaste	BJP	7,37,266	48.57	Kamal Singh Maravi	INC	6,39,592	42.14	97,674
15	Balaghat	77.66 ▲	Dhal Singh Bisen	BJP	6,96,102	50.71	Madhu Bhagat	INC	4,54,036	33.08	2,42,066
16	Chhindwara	82.42 ▲	Nakul Nath	INC	5,87,305	47.04	Nathan Saha Kawreti	BJP	5,49,769	44.04	37,536
17	Hoshangabad	74.22 ▲	Uday Pratap Singh	BJP	8,77,927	69.33	Chandarbhan Singh	INC	3,24,245	25.61	5,53,682
18	Vidisha	71.83 ▲	Ramakant Bhargav	BJP	8,53,022	68.19	Shailendra Patel	INC	3,49,338	27.97	5,03,084
19	Bhopal	65.74 ▲	Pragya Singh Thakur	BJP	8,66,482	61.51	Digvijaya Singh	INC	5,01,660	35.61	3,64,822
20	Rajgarh	74.42 ▲	Rodmal Nagar	BJP	8,23,824	65.33	Mona Sustani	INC	3,92,805	31.15	4,31,019
21	Dewas (SC)	79.51 ▲	Mahendra Solanki	BJP	8,62,429	61.62	Prahlad Tipanya	INC	4,90,180	35.02	3,72,249
22	Ujjain (SC)	75.43 ▲	Anil Firojiya	BJP	7,91,663	63.18	Babulal Malviya	INC	4,26,026	34	3,65,637
23	Mandsour	77.89 ▲	Sudhir Gupta	BJP	8,47,786	61.81	Meenakshi Natarajan	INC	4,71,052	34.34	3,76,734
24	Ratlam (ST)	75.70 ▲	Guman Singh Damor	BJP	6,96,103	49.67	Kantilal Bhuria	INC	6,05,467	43.21	90,636
25	Dhar	75.26 ▲	Chhatar Singh Darbar	BJP	7,22,147	53.72	Dinesh Girwal	INC	5,66,118	42.12	1,56,029
26	Indore	69.33 ▲	Shankar Lalwani	BJP	10,68,569	65.57	Pankaj Sanghvi	INC	5,20,815	31.96	5,47,754
27	Khargone (ST)	77.85 ▲	Gajendra Patel	BJP	7,73,550	54.17	Govind Mujalde	INC	5,71,040	39.99	2,02,510
28	Khandwa	76.90 ▲	Nandkumar Singh Chauhan	BJP	8,38,909	57.14	Arun Yadav	INC	5,65,566	38.52	2,73,343
29	Betul (ST)	78.18 ▲	Durgadas Uike	BJP	8,11,248	59.72	Ramu Tekam	INC	4,51,007	33.2	3,60,241

== Assembly segments wise lead of parties ==
Party	Assembly segments	Position in Assembly (as of 2023 election)
Bharatiya Janata Party	208	163
Indian National Congress	22	66
Others	–	1
Total	230	

== Post-election Union Council of Ministers from Madhya Pradesh ==
=== Cabinet Ministers ===
S No.	Minister	Party	Lok Sabha Seat/Rajya Sabha	Portfolios	Term Start	Term End
1.	Narendra Singh Tomar	Bharatiya Janata Party	Morena	Minister of Agriculture and Farmers' Welfare	31 May 2019	7 Dec 2023
1.	Narendra Singh Tomar	Bharatiya Janata Party	Morena	Minister of Rural Development	31 May 2019	7 July 2021
1.	Narendra Singh Tomar	Bharatiya Janata Party	Morena	Minister of Panchayati Raj	31 May 2019	7 July 2021
1.	Narendra Singh Tomar	Bharatiya Janata Party	Morena	Minister of Food Processing Industries	18 Sept 2020	7 July 2021
2.	Prahlad Singh Patel	Bharatiya Janata Party	Damoh	Minister of Culture	31 May 2019	7 July 2021
2.	Prahlad Singh Patel	Bharatiya Janata Party	Damoh	Minister of Tourism	31 May 2019	7 July 2021
3.	Thawar Chand Gehlot	Bharatiya Janata Party	Rajya Sabha	Minister of Social Justice and Empowerment	31 May 2019	6 July 2021
4.	Virendra Kumar Khatik	Bharatiya Janata Party	Tikamgarh	Minister of Social Justice and Empowerment	7 July 2021	Incumbent
5.	Jyotiraditya Scindia	Bharatiya Janata Party	Rajya Sabha	Minister of Civil Aviation	7 July 2021	Incumbent
5.	Jyotiraditya Scindia	Bharatiya Janata Party	Rajya Sabha	Minister of Steel	7 July 2021	Incumbent

=== Minister of State ===
S No.	Minister	Party	Lok Sabha Seat/Rajya Sabha	Portfolios	Term Start	Term End
1.	Faggan Singh Kulaste	Bharatiya Janata Party	Mandla	Minister of State in the Ministry of Steel	31 May 2019	Incumbent
1.	Faggan Singh Kulaste	Bharatiya Janata Party	Mandla	Minister of State in the Ministry of Rural Development	7 July 2021	Incumbent
2.	Prahlad Singh Patel	Bharatiya Janata Party	Damoh	Minister of State in the Ministry of Jal Shakti	7 July 2021	7 Dec 2023
2.	Prahlad Singh Patel	Bharatiya Janata Party	Damoh	Minister of State in the Ministry of Food Processing Industries	7 July 2021	7 Dec 2023
3.	L. Murugan	Bharatiya Janata Party	Rajya Sabha	Minister of State in the Ministry of Fisheries, Animal Husbandry and Dairying	7 July 2021	Incumbent
3.	L. Murugan	Bharatiya Janata Party	Rajya Sabha	Minister of State in the Ministry of Information and Broadcasting	7 July 2021	Incumbent
