= Surkhi Assembly constituency =

Constituency of the Madhya Pradesh legislative assembly in India

Coordinates: 23.63°N 78.83°E

Surkhi
- Constituency No. 37 for the Madhya Pradesh Legislative Assembly

Constituency details
- Country: India
- Region: Central India
- State: Madhya Pradesh
- District: Sagar
- Lok Sabha constituency: Sagar
- Established: 1951
- Reservation: None

Member of Legislative Assembly
- 16th Madhya Pradesh Legislative Assembly
- Incumbent Govind Singh Rajput
- Party: Bharatiya Janata Party
- Elected year: 2023
- Preceded by: Parul Sahu

Surkhi Assembly constituency is one of the 230 Vidhan Sabha (Legislative Assembly) constituencies of Madhya Pradesh state in central India. This constituency came into existence in 1951, as one of the Vidhan Sabha constituencies of Madhya Pradesh state.

== Overview ==
Surkhi (constituency number 37) is one of the 8 Vidhan Sabha constituencies located in Sagar district. This constituency presently covers the entire Surkhi town, Rahatgarh tehsil and part of Sagar tehsil of the district.

Surkhi is part of Sagar Lok Sabha constituency along with seven other Vidhan Sabha segments, namely, Bina, Khurai, Naryoli and Sagar in this district and Kurwai, Sironj and Shamshabad in Vidisha district.

== Members of Legislative Assembly ==
Election	Name	Party
1952	Jyotishi Jwala Prasad	Indian National Congress
1957	Bani Bhushan Rai	Indian National Congress
1962	Bani Bhushan Rai	Indian National Congress
1967	N. P. Rai	Bharatiya Jana Sangh
1972	Gaya Prasad Kabirpanthi	Indian National Congress
1977	Laxminarayan Yadav	Janata Party
1980	Vitthalbhai Patel	Indian National Congress (I)
1985	Vitthalbhai Patel	Indian National Congress
1990	Laxminarayan Yadav	Janata Dal
1993	Bhupendra Singh	Bharatiya Janata Party
1998	Bhupendra Singh	Bharatiya Janata Party
2003	Govind Singh Rajput	Indian National Congress
2008	Govind Singh Rajput	Indian National Congress
2013	Parul Sahu	Bharatiya Janata Party
2018	Govind Singh Rajput	Indian National Congress
2020^	Govind Singh Rajput	Bharatiya Janata Party
2023	Govind Singh Rajput	Bharatiya Janata Party

- ^ denotes by-election

== Election results ==
=== 2023 ===
2023 Madhya Pradesh Legislative Assembly election: Surkhi
Party	Candidate	Votes	%	±%
BJP	Govind Singh Rajput	83,551	48.73	−12.38
INC	Neeraj Sharma	81,373	47.46	+13.20
NOTA	None of the above	1,079	0.63	+0.08
Majority		2,178	1.27	−25.58
Turnout		171,456	76.41	+2.26
BJP hold		Swing		

=== 2020 bypoll ===
In the 2020 by-election, Govind Singh Rajput of the Bharatiya Janata Party won the seat by defeating Parul Sahu Keshri from the Indian National Congress with a margin of 40,991 votes. Rajput secured 93,294 votes while runner-up Parul got only 52,303 votes.

2020 Madhya Pradesh Legislative Assembly by-elections: Surkhi
Party	Candidate	Votes	%	±%
BJP	Govind Singh Rajput	93,294	61.11	+20.45
INC	Parul Sahu Keshri	52,303	34.26	−21.07
BSP	Gopal Prasad Ahirwar	1,585	1.04	
NOTA	None of the above	844	0.55	−0.91
Majority		40,991	26.85	+12.18
Turnout		152,671	74.15	−1.59
BJP gain from INC		Swing		

=== 2018 ===
2018 Madhya Pradesh Legislative Assembly election: Surkhi
Party	Candidate	Votes	%	±%
INC	Govind Singh Rajput	80,806	55.33	
BJP	Sudheer Yadav	59,388	40.66	
NOTA	None of the above	2,137	1.46	
Majority		21,418	14.67	
Turnout		146,046	75.74	
INC gain from BJP		Swing		

== See also ==
- Rahatgarh
- Surkhi
