= Sahodrabai Rai =

Indian politician

Member of Parliament
- In office 1957–1962
- Preceded by: Sodia Khubchand Daryao Singh
- Succeeded by: Jawala Prasad Jyotishi
- Constituency: Sagar

Member of Parliament
- In office 1971–1977
- Preceded by: Ramsingh Ayarwal
- Succeeded by: Narmada Prasad Rai
- Constituency: Sagar

Member of Parliament
- In office 1980–1981
- Preceded by: Narmada Prasad Rai
- Succeeded by: Nandlal Choudhary
- Constituency: Sagar

Personal details
- Born: 30 April 1919 Botrai Village, Patharia, Damoh District, Madhya Pradesh, India
- Died: 26 March 1981 (aged 61)
- Party: Indian National Congress
- Parent: Niren Singh (father)
- Occupation: Politician

Sahodrabai Devi Rai (30 April 1919 – 26 March 1981) was an Indian politician who was a member of the Indian National Congress and served four terms as an MP.

== Life and career ==
She won the 1957 general election of India from Sagar Lok Sabha constituency. Rai was also elected in 1971 and 1980 general elections of India, also from the Sagar Lok Sabha constituency. She was a member of the 2nd, 5th and 7th Lok Sabhas of India. She was member of 3rd Lok Sabha from Damoh

Rai worked for Hindu–Muslim unity in Noakhali and participated in satyagraha (loosely translated as "insistence on truth") against the British, in 1945. She was also arrested with Indira Gandhi in 1979 and imprisoned for a day.

She died in March 1981 at the age of 61.

== See also ==
- List of people from Madhya Pradesh
