= Anand Ahirwar =

Indian politician

Dr.Anand Ahirwar M.A.(political science) Ph.d

Member of Parliament
- In office 1991–1996
- Preceded by: Shanker Lal Khatique
- Succeeded by: Virendra Kumar
- Constituency: Sagar

Personal details
- Born: 1 July 1964 (age 62) Sagar, Madhya Pradesh, India
- Party: Indian National Congress
- Parent: Shri Tulsiram (father)
- Education: Dr. Hari Singh Gour University
- Occupation: Politician and Chairman of Madhya Pradesh SC Welfare Department Appointed on 15 March 2020

Anand Ahirwar (born 1 July 1964) is an Indian politician from the Indian National Congress.

== Career ==
He was a member of the Indian 10th Lok Sabha (1991–1996) from Sagar constituency. In present he is Chairman of Madhya Pradesh SC Welfare Department (15 March 2020). He was pulled by Central Information Commission for not paying his phone bills later.

== See also ==
- List of people from Madhya Pradesh
