= Nandlal Choudhary =

Indian politician (born 1933)

Member of Parliament
- In office 1984–1989
- Preceded by: Sahodrabai Rai
- Succeeded by: Shankar Lal Khatik
- Constituency: Sagar (Lok Sabha constituency)

Personal details
- Born: 14 October 1933 Sagar, Central Provinces and Berar, British India
- Party: Indian National Congress(I)
- Spouse: Kamla devi (m. 1942)
- Children: 2
- Parent: Shri parmanand Choudhary(Father)
- Education: Bachelor of Arts, Bachelor of Laws
- Alma mater: Degree College Khurai & Dr. Hari Singh Gour University
- Occupation: Politician

Nandlal Choudhary (born 14 October 1933) is an Indian politician from the Indian National Congress(I) party. He is a Member of the 8th Lok sabha of India. He was also elected for Member of Legislative Assembly in 1962 from Khurai (Sagar).
