= Ramsingh Ayarwal =

Indian politician

Member of Parliament
- In office 1967–1971
- Preceded by: Jawala Prasad Jyotishi
- Succeeded by: Sahodrabai Rai
- Constituency: Sagar

Personal details
- Born: 1 April 1938 (age 88) Purviyao Tori, Sagar, Madhya Pradesh, India
- Party: Bharatiya Jana Sangh
- Spouse: Raj Rani
- Children: Two (one son; one daughter)
- Parent: Ganpat Lal Master (father)
- Education: Dr. Hari Singh Gour University (Bachelor of Arts)
- Occupation: Politician and social worker

Ramsingh Ayarwal (born 1 April 1938) is an Indian politician from the Bharatiya Jana Sangh party.

== Career ==
He was a member of the 4th Lok Sabha of India, having won the 1967 general election of India from the Sagar Lok Sabha constituency.

== See also ==
- List of people from Madhya Pradesh
