= Lata Wankhede =

Member of the Lok Sabha

Member of Parliament, Lok Sabha
- Incumbent
- Assumed office 4 June 2024
- Preceded by: Rajbahadur Singh
- Constituency: Sagar, Madhya Pradesh

Personal details
- Born: 24 February 1970 (age 56) Pathariya, Damoh District, Madhya Pradesh
- Party: BJP
- Spouse: Nandkishor Wankhede (m.30 May 1990)
- Parent(s): Keshavrao Bodh, Leela
- Occupation: Agriculture

Lata Wankhede (Hindi pronunciation: [lət̪aː ʋaːn̪.kʰeːɽeː]) is an Indian politician. She was elected to the Lok Sabha, lower house of the Parliament of India from Sagar, Madhya Pradesh in the 2024 Indian general election as member of the Bharatiya Janata Party.

She defeated INC candidate Chandra Bhusan Singh Bundela (Guddu Raja) by 471222 votes.
