= Uttamchand Khatik =

Indian politician

Member of the Madhya Pradesh Legislative Assembly
- In office 1980–1985
- Preceded by: Lila Dhar
- Succeeded by: Lokman Khatik
- Constituency: Naryoli

Personal details
- Born: 1950
- Died: 2016 (aged 65–66) Sagar
- Party: Indian National Congress
- Occupation: Politician
- Profession: Business

Uttamchand Khatik (1950–2016) was an Indian politician and a member of legislative assembly of Madhya Pradesh. He was representing Naryoli (Vidhan Sabha constituency) of Madhya Pradesh. Uttamchand was a senior Congress leader and died in 2016 at the age of 66. He was the younger brother of former Member of Parliament Shankar Lal Khatik.
