= Hari Singh Gour =

Indian lawyer and educationist (1870–1949)

Sir Hari Singh Gour FRSL
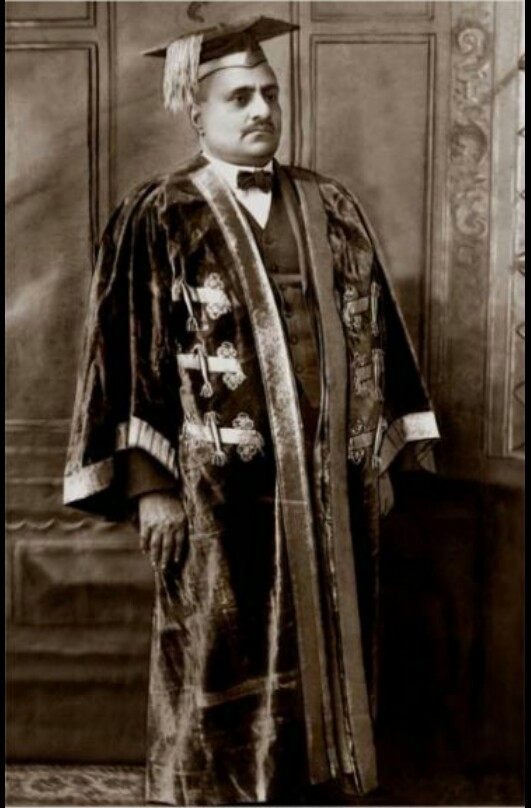
- Born: 26 November 1870; Sagar, Central Provinces, British India
- Died: 25 December 1949 (aged 79); Sagar, Central Provinces and Berar, India
- Education: Downing College, Cambridge; Trinity College, Dublin
- Organization: Delhi University

Sir Hari Singh Gour FRSL (26 November 1870 – 25 December 1949) was a lawyer, jurist, educationist, social reformer, poet, and novelist. Gour was the First Vice-Chancellor of the University of Delhi and Nagpur University, founder and Vice-Chancellor of the University of Sagar, Deputy President of the Central Legislative Assembly of British India, an Indian Delegate to the Joint Parliamentary Committee, a Member of the Indian Central Committee associated with the Royal Commission on the Indian Constitution (popularly known as the Simon Commission), and a Fellow of the Royal Society of Literature.

== Early years ==
Hari Singh Gour was born on 26 November 1870 to a poor Bundeli Rajput family near Sagar, in the state of Madhya Pradesh. The family had to be supported by Hari Singh's eldest brother who provided an allowance of 50 rupees per month. Hari Singh's father was a carpenter and farmer but the young boy did not have an interest in either trade. At the age of ten, Hari Singh won a scholarship of two rupees per month which enabled him to attend a night school in Sagar.

Later, with the help of another scholarship he went to Jabalpur to undertake further studies. Mathematics was his favourite subject and for this he received a special prize. In Jabalpur, he went for his matriculation but he failed in the first time as he was deeply disturbed as someone stole his gold ring which he had bought by saving 10 rupees from all his scholarships. But the second time he passed out with good marks. He passed his Intermediate examination from Hislop College, Nagpur, a free church institution, standing first in the whole province.

== Education ==
When he was 18 years old, Hari Singh Gour went to the University of Cambridge. He reportedly experienced a great deal of racism as a student. He participated in a mathematics competition, for which the results were not declared. Some years after obtaining his LL.D. he learned that the scholarship which the competition awarded was not given to foreigners, especially "blacks," as Indians were referred to by the British. As he came first in the competition, the scholarship ended up not being awarded to any one. He faced similar treatment in other situations and academic competitions, however he never let this unfair treatment by the British discourage him. Instead, he began to write poetry. He came to be known in literary circles as a promising poet, becoming acquainted with the likes of George Bernard Shaw. He wrote a book of poetry entitled Stepping Westward and Other Poems due to which he became somewhat of a celebrity and was thereby selected a Member of the Royal Society of Literature.

He was admitted as a pensioner at Downing College, Cambridge on 5 June 1889. Gour received his BA in 1892; the MA in 1896; LL.M. in 1902; and finally the LL.D. in 1908.

After his time at Cambridge, he read for the D.Litt. and LL.D. at Trinity College, Dublin. He received an honorary D.Litt. from the University of Delhi, where he served as the institution's first Vice-Chancellor.

== Career ==
On his return to India he became a successful lawyer in Raipur. He was called to the Bar, Inner Temple on 26 November 1872. Gour practised in the High Courts of India, including the Central Provinces, Calcutta, and Allahabad. He wrote The Law of Transfer in British India and The Penal Law of India. Another book entitled Hindu Law Code published later added to his reputation as a great jurist. In the Central Legislative Assembly in 1921, Gour denounced the sequestration and suppression of women. He was also a social reformer and was successful in getting an act passed to enable women to be enrolled as lawyers, while his Civil Marriage Bill of 1923 showed him to be a reformer thinking ahead of his time. Gour was not only a progressive scholar; he demonstrated such forward thinking in his personal life as well. He married Olivia, daughter of Balwant Singh of Bhandara. Gour was knighted in 1925. The first bill for the abolition of untouchability was introduced in 1921 by Hari Singh Gour.

By his determination and industry combined with a gift of oratory, Gour rose to an eminent position in the political scene. He became a Leader of the Opposition and of the Nationalist Party in the Indian Legislative Assembly from 1921 to 1934. Gour was also president of the High Court Bar Association in Nagpur and president of the Hindu Association. He was an Indian Delegate to the Joint Parliamentary Committee on the Government of India Bill in 1933. He was a Member of the Constituent Assembly that framed India's Constitution.

=== On good governance ===
Gour focused on the importance of skill Administration and good governance and it could very well be reflected not only in his writings but in his conduct as well. As a lawyer and revenue officer in Jabalpur District Court in 1893, he successfully managed to dispose of 300 pending cases in one year only. His book on Hindu law references 500 books and more than 7,000 cases.

=== Indian Penal Code ===
The Indian Penal Code was passed by the Legislative Council of India on 6 October 1860 on which date it received the assent of the Governor-General. Since that time, the Indian Penal Code had come to be the law of the land, with its amendments and modifications. However, the Indian Penal Code retained very severe means of punishment. Gour vehemently opposed such measures, stating:

No civilized country today imposes such heavy sentences as does the [Indian] Penal Code. Heavy sentences have long gone out of fashion in England and the order of sanctity and perfection attaching to the Penal Code should not deter indigenous legislatures to thoroughly revise the sentences, bringing them into conformity with modern, civilized standards.

The Indian Penal Code was "draconian in its severity with regard to punishment," according to Gour, who firmly believed that solitary confinement as a form of punishment under Section 73 of the Indian Penal Code lacked rational basis. Solitary confinement had been abolished in England and Gour claimed that it would be in keeping with the civilised culture of India to wipe out this kind of punishment.

=== Age of Consent Bill ===
The 1891 Age of Consent Act had established that the minimum age of consent within marriage for girls should be 12 years. In 1922, Rai Bahadur Bakshi Sohan Lal (MLA) proposed that the age of consent should be raised from 12 to 14. This motion was defeated. Then, in 1924, Gour brought the age of consent issue back into the Legislature with a similar proposal to raise the minimum age from 12 to 14 years for girls; after amendments and the appointment of a select committee, Gour's Bill was passed to raise the age of consent within marriage to 13 for girls in 1925.

In March 1928, Gour, who had always been a steadfast proponent of age of consent bills, appealed to the importance of realising standards of modern clinical psychology and pointed out the emotional problems of early marriage, such as the incidence of polygamy as grooms grew up and decided they desired more compatible partners, possible occurrence of suicide and early death, and generally marital unhappiness for both partners.

In 1929, his book, Sprit of Buddhism, was published.

== Legacy ==
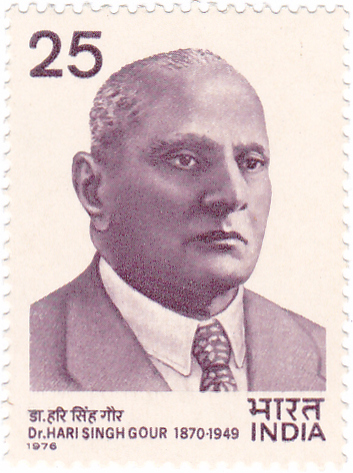
Hari Singh Gour on a 1976 stamp of India

Gour was also an educationist. He graced University of Delhi as its first Vice-Chancellor and was Vice-Chancellor of Nagpur University for two successive terms. Of his most important contributions was the founding of the University of Sagar, now officially known as Dr. Hari Singh Gour University, the oldest university in the state of Madhya Pradesh, in 1946 for which he made a munificent donation. He founded the University of Sagar with 2 million rupees and gave about two crores in property as a donation to the University. He became the first Vice-Chancellor of the University of Sagar and occupied this position until he died on 25 December 1949. He bequeathed the greater part of his life's savings, a large fortune, to the University of Sagar.

The Indian Posts and Telegraphs Department issued a commemorative stamp of Dr. Hari Singh Gour on 26 November 1976. The Madhya Pradesh Council of science and technology provides Dr. Hari Singh Gour State Award in the field of social science.

He was a freemason and is remembered for his support to charitable causes.

== Selected works ==
- The Transfer of Property in British India: Being an Analytical Commentary on the Transfer of Property Act, 1882 as Amended ..., Published by Thacker, Spink, 1901.
- The Law of Transfer in British India, Vol. 1–3 (1902)
- The Penal Law of India, Vol. 1–2 (1909)
- Hindu Code (1919)
- India and the New Constitution (1947)
- Renaissance of India (1942)
- The Spirit of Buddhism (1929)
- His only Love (1929)
- Random Rhymes (1892)
- Facts and Fancies (1948)
- Seven Lives (1944)
- Letters from Heaven
- Lost Soul
- Truth about India
- India Before Buddha and the Faith and Philosophy of His Time
- Buddhism and Christianity and Other Faith's
- The Future Constitution of India: Being the Rao Bahadur Bapu Rao Dada Lectures
- Passing Clouds...

== See also ==
- University of Sagar
- Sagar
