= Shankar Lal Khatik =

Indian politician

Member of parliament, 9th Lok Sabha
- In office 1989–1991
- Preceded by: Nandlal Choudhary
- Succeeded by: Anand Ahirwar
- Constituency: Sagar (Lok Sabha constituency)

Personal details
- Born: 3 March 1935 (age 90); Sagar, Madhya Pradesh, India
- Political party: Bharatiya Janata Party
- Spouse: Prem Kumari (m. 1954)
- Children: Two sons and three daughters
- Parent: Kundan Lal (father)
- Occupation: Politician and social worker

Shankar Lal Khatik (born 3 March 1935) is an Indian politician from the Bharatiya Janata Party. He was brother of former MLA late Uttamchand Khatik.

== Career ==
He won the 1989 general election of India from the Sagar Lok Sabha constituency. He was a member of the Indian 9th Lok Sabha (1989–1991).

== See also ==
- List of people from Madhya Pradesh
