= Laxmi Narayan Yadav =

Indian politician

Member of Parliament, Lok Sabha
- In office 16 May 2014 – 23 May 2019
- Preceded by: Bhupendra Singh
- Succeeded by: Rajbahadur Singh
- Constituency: Sagar

Member of the Madhya Pradesh Legislative Assembly for Surkhi
- In office 1990 – 1993
- Preceded by: Vitthalbhai Patel
- Succeeded by: Bhupendra Singh
- In office 1977 – 1980
- Preceded by: Gaya Prasad Kabirpanthi
- Succeeded by: Vitthalbhai Patel

Minister of Higher Education, Cabinet of Madhya Pradesh
- In office 1978 – 1980

Personal details
- Born: 9 December 1944 (age 81) Sagar, Central Provinces and Berar, British India
- Party: BJP (since 2014)
- Other political affiliations: Janata Party (1977–1993)
- Education: B.A.; LL.B.
- Alma mater: Sagar University; University of Delhi
- Website: www.laxminarayanyadav.in

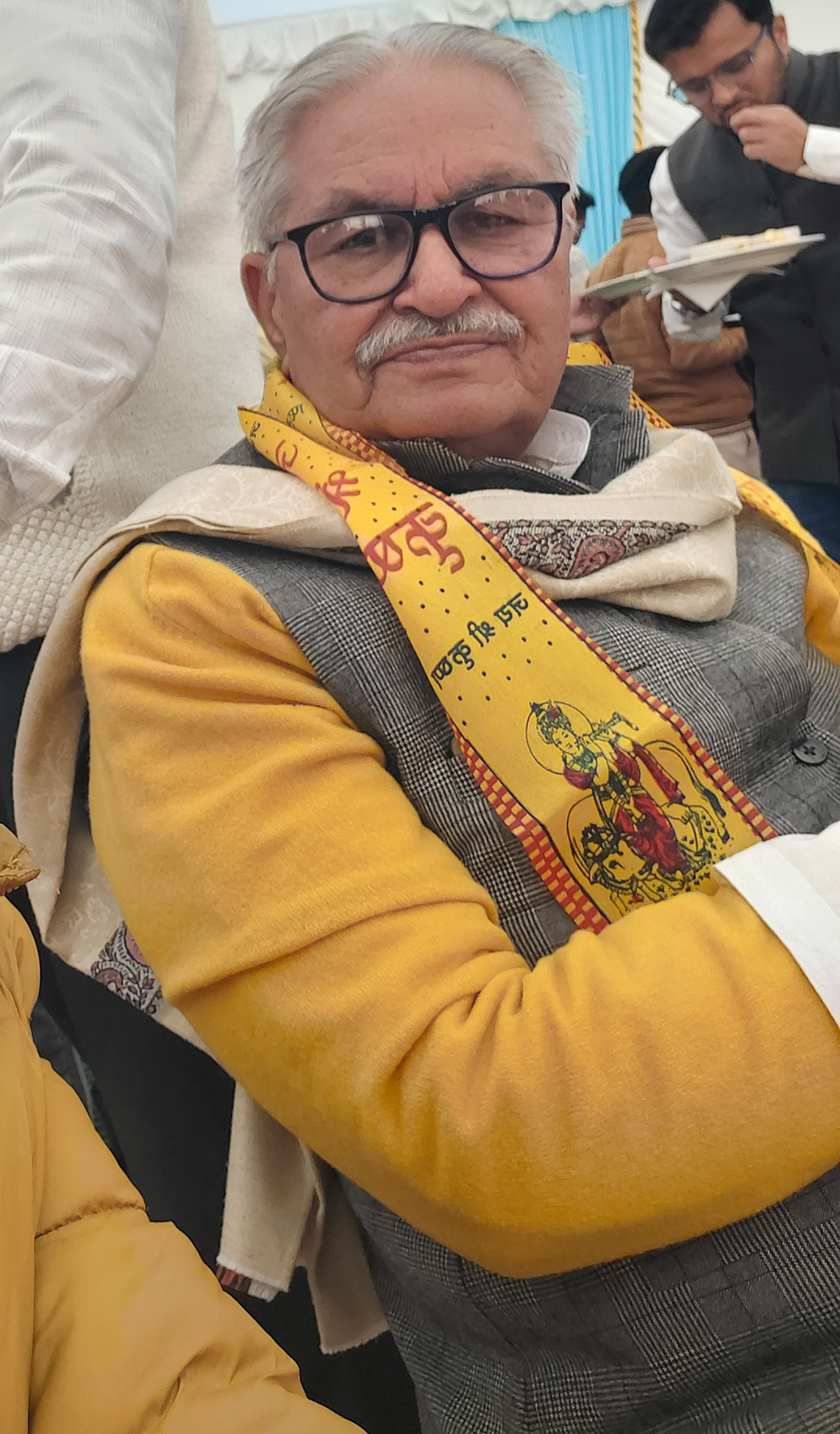
Lakshmi Narayan Yadav in Bhopal, 2026

Laxmi Narayan Yadav (Hindi pronunciation: [ləkʂmiː n̪aːɾaːjəɳ jaːd̪əʋ]) is a socialist leader and former member of parliament (MP) of Bhartiya Janata Party. He has won the 2014 Indian general elections from the Sagar (Lok Sabha constituency). He is two times MLA from Surkhi (Vidhan Sabha constituency) assembly seat of Sagar district in Madhya Pradesh. First time, he was elected in 1977 from Surkhi (Vidhan Sabha constituency) from Janata Party. He has defeated Vitthalbhai Patel who was a Congress leader and Jhooth Bole Kauwa Kaate famed Bollywood lyricist and poet and industrialist. During the same tenure in 1978 – 1980 he served as Minister for Higher Education, in Government of Madhya Pradesh in the Sakhlecha ministry. Mr. Virendra Kumar Sakhlecha was the then chief minister. Second time, in 1989, Mr. Yadav again defeated Patel from the same constituency.

== Personal life ==
Mr. Yadav was born on 9 December 1944 in Sagar, Madhya Pradesh. Mr. Yadav married Mrs Gayatri Devi on 29 June 1961. He has a son Sudheer Yadav who is a member of Bhartiya Janta Party and a daughter. His son Sudheer Yadav (also spelled as Sudhir Yadav) fought assembly elections from Banda (Vidhan Sabha constituency) in Sagar district, Madhya Pradesh from Bharatiya Janshakti Party of Uma Bharti but couldn't succeed. He again fought for assembly in 2018 from Surkhi (Vidhan Sabha constituency) but lost again.

== Election results ==
General Election, 2014: Sagar
Party	Candidate	Votes	%	±%
BJP	Laxmi Narayan Yadav	4,82,580	54.10	
INC	Govind Singh Rajput	3,61,843	40.57	
BSP	Saroj Katiyar	19,917	2.23	
NOTA	None of the Above	9,504	1.07	
Majority		1,20,737	13.53	
Turnout		8,91,929	58.67	
BJP hold		Swing		
