= Narmada Prasad Rai =

Indian politician

Member of Parliament
- In office 1977–1980
- Preceded by: Sahodrabai Rai
- Succeeded by: Sahodrabai Rai
- Constituency: Sagar (Lok Sabha constituency)

Personal details
- Born: 1910-03 August 1997; Dhana, Sagar, Madhya Pradesh
- Political party: Bharatiya Lok Dal & Jan Sangh
- Spouse: Raj Rani Rai (m. 1930)
- Children: 4 Son & 1 Daughter
- Parent: Babu Lal Rai (Father)
- Occupation: Politician & Social worker

Narmda Prasad Rai (born 1910, date of death unknown) was an Indian politician from the Janata Party. He is a Member of the 6th Lok sabha of India. He won the 1977 General election of India from Sagar Lok Sabha constituency.
