= Nathu Ram Ahirwar =

Indian politician

Nathuram Ahirwar
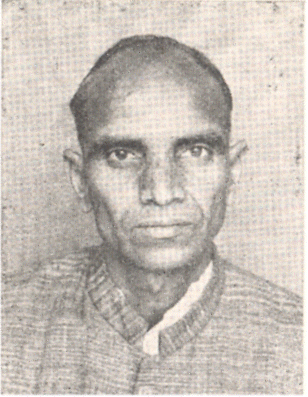

Member of the Legislative Assembly (India)
- In office 1957–1962

Member of Parliament, Lok Sabha
- In office 1967–1977
- Succeeded by: Virendra Kumar
- Constituency: Tikamgarh

Minister of Rehabilitation and Cooperation and Education
- In office 1978–1980

Member of Madhya Pradesh Legislative Assembly
- In office 1978–1980
- Preceded by: Baiju Ahriwar
- Succeeded by: Nathu Ram Ahirwar
- Constituency: Khargapur (Vidhan Sabha constituency)

Personal details
- Born: 1 July 1923 Bhamoura Khas, Tikamgarh, Madhya Pradesh, India
- Died: 5 December 2013 (aged 90)
- Party: Indian National Congress
- Other party: Janata Party
- Spouse: Mrs. Yashoda Bai
- Parent: Mr. Ramdas
- Occupation: Politician

Nathu Ram Ahirwar (1 July 1923 – 5 December 2013) was an Indian politician, social leader, former Education minister and educationist from the village of Bhamoura Khas in Tikamgarh district of Madhya Pradesh, India. Former minister of Madhya Pradesh and senior Congress leader, he died at his ancestral village Bhamoura Khas here following brief illness. Ahirwar, who had been ailing for quite some time, died on 5 December 2013 around 18:00, his family said.

He has served as a Member of Madhya Pradesh Legislative Assembly for years 1957-62 and was also elected as a Member of Fourth Lok Sabha - (1967–70) and Fifth Lok Sabha - (1971-1977) as a member of Congress Party from Tikamgarh constituency, a seat reserved for Scheduled Castes. He has also served as Minister of State for Rehabilitation and Cooperation and Education Minister. He was elected as Member of Madhya Pradesh Legislative Assembly from Khargapur constituency in 1977 as representative of Janata Party and in 1980 as member of Congress Party. After 1997, he left Congress and joined Bahujan Samaj Party.

He is noted for his activities for betterment of scheduled castes and also an educationist, who served as member of Secondary Education Committee, Madhya Pradesh (1958–63). He has also founded a Higher Secondary School at Teharka Tikamgarh and also was Vice-President, Degree College of Newari near Tikamgarh.
