= Vitthalbhai Patel =

Indian poet, lyricist and politician (1936-2013)

Member of the Madhya Pradesh Legislative Assembly
- In office 1980–1990
- Preceded by: Laxminarayan Yadav
- Succeeded by: Laxminarayan Yadav
- Constituency: Surkhi

Personal details
- Born: 21 May 1936 Sagar, Central Provinces and Berar, British India
- Died: 7 September 2013 (aged 77) Sagar, Madhya Pradesh, India
- Party: Indian National Congress
- Children: 1 son and 2 daughters
- Profession: Indian poet, Social activist, lyricist, and senior congress leader

Vitthalbhai Patel (21 May 1936 – 7 September 2013) was an Indian poet, lyricist, and senior Congress leader known for his contributions in social services and politics as well as for penning several Hindi film songs, including "Na Maangu Sona Chaandi" and "Jhooth Bole Kauva Kaate" from the 1973 movie Bobby, "Wo kahate hain" from the 1988 movie Dariya Dil, and "Band ho Mutthi To Laakh Ki" from the 1977 film Dharam-Veer.

He was from Sagar, Madhya Pradesh, India where he lived most of his life. He wrote in Hindi and Bundeli.

He died on 7 September 2013 after a prolonged illness. He was 75.

Patel was twice elected to the Madhya Pradesh Legislative Assembly from Surkhi constituency. He was a minister in the cabinets of Arjun Singh, Motilal Vora and Shyama Charan Shukla.

Patel wrote the lyrics to 55 Hindi film songs, as well as five collections of poems.
