= Bani Bhushan Rai =

Indian politician

- B.B. Rai

Bani Bhushan Rai was an Indian politician from the state of the Madhya Pradesh. He represented Surkhi Vidhan Sabha constituency of undivided Madhya Pradesh Legislative Assembly by winning General election of 1957.
