= Bhamoura Khas =

Bhamoura khas
- Village
- Location in Madhya Pradesh, India
- Coordinates: 25°4′25″N 78°52′11″E
- Country: India
- State: Madhya Pradesh
- District: Tikamgarh
- Tehsil: Niwari, Madhya Pradesh

Government
  - Type: Gram Panchayat
  - Body: Sarpanch & Panch
  - Sarpanch: Mr. Yadvendra singh yadav {Brajendra} - 17th Jan 2015 to present

Population (2011)
  - Total: 1,122

Languages
  - Official: Hindi, Bundeli
- Time zone: UTC+5:30 (IST)
- Postal code: 472447
- Vehicle registration: MP36
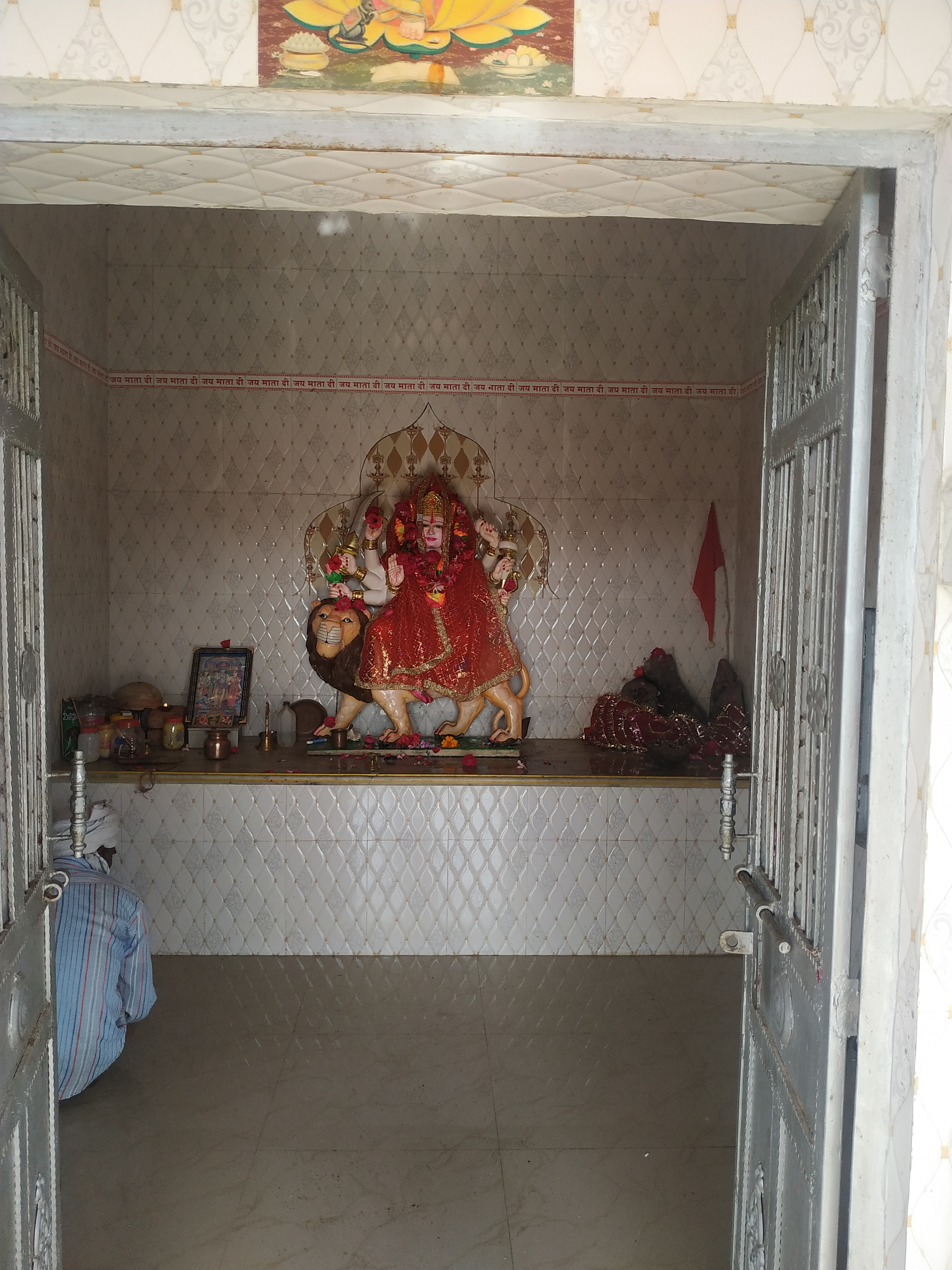

Bhamoura Khas is a village and a gram panchayat in Niwari Tehsil in the Tikamgarh district in the Indian state of Madhya Pradesh. Bhamoura Khas belongs to the Sagar Division. It is located 78 kilometers north from the district headquarters Tikamgarh and 317 kilometers from the state capital Bhopal. Bhamoura Khas is on the border of the Tikamgarh District and Jhansi District. Bhamoura Khas is surrounded by Prithvipur Tehsil on the South, Mauranipur Tehsil on the East, and Chirgaon Tehsil on the North.

== Demographics ==
As of the 2011 Census of India, Bhamoura Khas had a population of 1122. There were 586 males and 536 females. 149 people were under the age of 6. Bhamoura Khas had a literacy rate of 62.5%, while 39.3% of its population belong to Scheduled Castes.

== Notable people ==
- Nathu Ram Ahirwar
