= List of constituencies of the Lok Sabha =

Lok Sabha constituencies
- Lok Sabha constituencies of India
- Category: Electoral districts
- Location: India
- Number: 543
- Government: Lok Sabha

The Lok Sabha, the Lower House of the Parliament of India, is made up of Members of Parliament (MPs). Each member of parliament represents a single geographic constituency.

The maximum size of the Lok Sabha as outlined in the Constitution of India is 550 members, made up of up to 530 members representing people of 28 states and 20 members representing people of 8 union territories based on their population. There are currently 543 constituencies in the Lok Sabha.

== Delimitation of constituencies ==
Under the Delimitation Act of 2002, the Delimitation Commission of India has redefined the list of parliamentary constituencies, their constituent assembly segments and reservation status (whether reserved for Scheduled castes (SC) candidates or Scheduled tribes (ST) candidates or unreserved). 2008 Karnataka Legislative Assembly election, which took place in May 2008, was the first state election to use newly demarcated assembly constituencies. Consequently, all assembly elections scheduled in 2008, viz. in the states of Chhattisgarh, Madhya Pradesh, NCT of Delhi, Mizoram and Rajasthan were based on newly defined assembly constituencies.

The size and shape of the Parliamentary and Assembly Constituencies are determined, according to section 4 of the Representation of the People Act, 1951, by an independent Delimitation Commission. Under a constitutional amendment of 1976, delimitation was suspended until after the census of 2001. However, certain amendments to the Constitution made in 2001 and 2003 have, while putting a freeze on the total number of existing seats as allocated to various States in the House of the People and the State Legislative Assemblies based on the 1971 census until the first census to be taken after the year 2026, provided that each State shall be delimited into territorial Parliamentary and Assembly Constituencies based on 2001 census and the extent of such constituencies as delimited shall remain frozen until the first census to be taken after the year 2026. The number of seats to be reserved for SC/ ST shall be re-worked based on the 2001 census. The constituency shall be delimited in a manner that the population of each Parliamentary and Assembly Constituency in a State so far as practicable be the same throughout the State.

== Summary ==
The Delimitation Commission, set up under the Delimitation Act, 2002, was entrusted with the task of readjusting all parliamentary and assembly constituencies in the country in all the states of India, except the state of Jammu and Kashmir, based on population ascertained in 2001 Census. The government of India promulgated an Ordinance amending the Delimitation Act, of 2002 nullifies the Final Order of the Delimitation Commission for the state of Jharkhand. Later on, the Government passed four separate Orders under Sec 10 A of the Delimitation Act, 2002, deferring the delimitation exercise in the four North Eastern states of Assam, Arunachal Pradesh, Manipur and Nagaland. The following table indicates the total number of seats and the number of seats reserved for SC and ST statewise.

Between 1952 and 2020, two seats were reserved in the Lok Sabha for members of the Anglo-Indian community. They were nominated by the President of India on the advice of the Government of India. In 2020, it was abolished under the 104th Constitutional Amendment Act, 2019.

Largest and smallest Lok Sabha constituencies in India
	Largest	Smallest
By area	Ladakh	Chandni Chowk
By electorate	Malkajgiri	Lakshadweep

Lok Sabha constituencies per state/union territory
#	State/ union territory	Seats					Population (2011)	Population per constituency
#	State/ union territory	General	SC	ST	Total	Total (%)	Population (2011)	Population per constituency
1	Andhra Pradesh	20	4	1	25	4.60%	49,577,103	1,983,084
2	Arunachal Pradesh	2	-	-	2	0.37%	1,383,727	691,864
3	Assam	11	1	2	14	2.58%	31,205,576	2,228,970
4	Bihar	34	6	-	40	7.37%	104,099,452	2,602,486
5	Chhattisgarh	6	1	4	11	2.03%	25,545,198	2,322,291
6	Goa	2	-	-	2	0.37%	1,458,545	729,273
7	Gujarat	20	2	4	26	4.79%	60,439,692	2,324,604
8	Haryana	8	2	-	10	1.84%	25,351,462	2,535,146
9	Himachal Pradesh	3	1	-	4	0.74%	6,864,602	1,716,151
10	Jharkhand	8	1	5	14	2.58%	32,988,134	2,356,295
11	Karnataka	21	5	2	28	5.16%	61,095,297	2,181,975
12	Kerala	18	2	-	20	3.68%	33,406,061	1,670,303
13	Madhya Pradesh	19	4	6	29	5.34%	72,626,809	2,504,373
14	Maharashtra	39	5	4	48	8.84%	112,374,333	2,341,132
15	Manipur	1	-	1	2	0.37%	2,570,390	1,285,195
16	Meghalaya	-	-	2	2	0.37%	2,966,889	1,483,445
17	Mizoram	-	-	1	1	0.18%	1,097,206	1,097,206
18	Nagaland	1	-	-	1	0.18%	1,978,502	1,978,502
19	Odisha	13	3	5	21	3.87%	41,974,219	1,998,772
20	Punjab	9	4	-	13	2.39%	27,743,338	2,134,103
21	Rajasthan	18	4	3	25	4.60%	68,548,437	2,741,937
22	Sikkim	1	-	-	1	0.18%	610,577	610,577
23	Tamil Nadu	32	7	-	39	7.18%	72,147,030	1,849,924
24	Telangana	12	3	2	17	3.13%	35,003,674	2,059,040
25	Tripura	1	-	1	2	0.37%	3,673,917	1,836,959
26	Uttar Pradesh	63	17	-	80	14.73%	199,812,341	2,497,654
27	Uttarakhand	4	1	-	5	0.92%	10,086,292	2,017,258
28	West Bengal	30	10	2	42	7.74%	91,276,115	2,173,241
29	Andaman and Nicobar Islands	1	-	-	1	0.18%	380,581	380,581
30	Chandigarh	1	-	-	1	0.18%	1,055,450	1,055,450
31	Dadra and Nagar Haveli and Daman and Diu	1	-	1	2	0.37%	585,764	292,882
32	Jammu and Kashmir	5	-	-	5	0.92%	12,267,032	2,453,406
33	Ladakh	1	-	-	1	0.18%	274,000	274,000
34	Lakshadweep	-	-	1	1	0.18%	64,473	64,473
35	Delhi	6	1	-	7	1.29%	16,787,941	2,398,277
36	Puducherry	1	-	-	1	0.18%	1,247,953	1,247,953
Overall		412	84	47	543	100%	1,210,569,573	2,229,410

== Andaman and Nicobar Islands (1) ==
Constituency of Andaman and Nicobar Islands

Constituency		Reserved for (SC/ST/None)	Electors (2024)
No.	Name	Reserved for (SC/ST/None)	Electors (2024)
1	Andaman and Nicobar Islands	None	3,15,745

== Andhra Pradesh (25) ==
Constituencies of Andhra Pradesh

Constituency		Reserved for (SC/ST/None)	Electors (2024)
No.	Name	Reserved for (SC/ST/None)	Electors (2024)
1	Araku	ST	15,57,153
2	Srikakulam	None	16,46,686
3	Vizianagaram	None	15,90,994
4	Visakhapatnam	None	19,31,398
5	Anakapalli	None	16,01,365
6	Kakinada	None	16,34,921
7	Amalapuram	SC	15,32,229
8	Rajahmundry	None	16,23,852
9	Narasapuram	None	14,73,811
10	Eluru	None	16,38,116
11	Machilipatnam	None	15,40,045
12	Vijayawada	None	17,04,469
13	Guntur	None	17,93,324
14	Narasaraopet	None	17,36,162
15	Bapatla	SC	15,11,177
16	Ongole	None	16,14,525
17	Nandyal	None	17,24,191
18	Kurnool	None	17,24,191
19	Anantapur	None	17,69,264
20	Hindupur	None	16,58,529
21	Kadapa	None	16,41,349
22	Nellore	None	17,12,840
23	Tirupati	SC	17,30,318
24	Rajampet	None	16,67,385
25	Chittoor	SC	16,43,593

== Arunachal Pradesh (2) ==
Constituencies of Arunachal Pradesh

Constituency		Reserved for (SC/ST/None)	Electors (2024)
No.	Name	Reserved for (SC/ST/None)	Electors (2024)
1	Arunachal West	None	5,20,085
2	Arunachal East	None	3,78,357

== Assam (14) ==
After 2023 Delimitation

Constituencies of Assam after 2023

Constituency		Reserved For (SC/ST/None)	Electors (2024)
No	Name	Reserved For (SC/ST/None)	Electors (2024)
1	Kokrajhar	ST	14,94,404
2	Dhubri	None	26,63,987
3	Barpeta	None	19,79,051
4	Darrang-Udalguri	None	22,14,516
5	Guwahati	None	20,39,765
6	Diphu	ST	9,02,050
7	Karimganj	None	14,14,520
8	Silchar	SC	13,74,559
9	Nagaon	None	18,21,023
10	Kaziranga	None	20,53,805
11	Sonitpur	None	16,38,992
12	Lakhimpur	None	15,80,500
13	Dibrugarh	None	16,61,998
14	Jorhat	None	17,32,944

Before 2023 Delimitation

Constituencies of Assam before 2023

Constituency		Reserved For (SC/ST/None)
No	Name	Reserved For (SC/ST/None)
1	Karimganj	SC
2	Silchar	None
3	Autonomous District	ST
4	Dhubri	None
5	Kokrajhar	ST
6	Barpeta	None
7	Gauhati	None
8	Mangaldoi	None
9	Tezpur	None
10	Nowgong	None
11	Kaliabor	None
12	Jorhat	None
13	Dilbrugarh	None
14	Lakhimpur	None

== Bihar (40) ==
Constituencies of Bihar

Constituency		Reserved for (SC/ST/None)	Electors (2024)
No.	Name	Reserved for (SC/ST/None)	Electors (2024)
1	Valmiki Nagar	None	18,29,052
2	Paschim Champaran	None	17,59,234
3	Purvi Champaran	None	17,93,440
4	Sheohar	None	18,34,437
5	Sitamarhi	None	19,50,028
6	Madhubani	None	19,36,759
7	Jhanjharpur	None	20,05,278
8	Supaul	None	19,28,887
9	Araria	None	20,19,757
10	Kishanganj	None	18,30,197
11	Katihar	None	18,34,512
12	Purnia	None	18,95,036
13	Madhepura	None	20,73,608
14	Darbhanga	None	17,82,853
15	Muzaffarpur	None	18,69,072
16	Vaishali	None	18,71,877
17	Gopalganj	SC	20,27,054
18	Siwan	None	19,01,956
19	Maharajganj	None	19,42,449
20	Saran	None	18,00,790
21	Hajipur	SC	19,72,915
22	Ujiarpur	None	17,48,377
23	Samastipur	SC	18,20,016
24	Begusarai	None	22,00,435
25	Khagaria	None	18,43,767
26	Bhagalpur	None	19,88,207
27	Banka	None	18,59,967
28	Munger	None	20,51,829
29	Nalanda	None	22,93,994
30	Patna Sahib	None	22,95,527
31	Pataliputra	None	20,80,613
32	Arrah	None	21,83,625
33	Buxar	None	19,34,352
34	Sasaram	SC	19,14,914
35	Karakat	None	18,88,005
36	Jahanabad	None	16,78,716
37	Aurangabad	None	18,75,809
38	Gaya	SC	18,21,330
39	Nawada	None	20,10,286
40	Jamui	SC	19,10,619

== Chandigarh (1) ==
Constituency of Chandigarh

Constituency		Reserved for (SC/ST/None)	Electors (2024)
No.	Name	Reserved for (SC/ST/None)	Electors (2024)
1	Chandigarh	None	6,60,552

== Chhattisgarh (11) ==
Constituencies of Chhattisgarh

Constituency		Reserved for (SC/ST/None)	Electors (2024)
No.	Name	Reserved for (SC/ST/None)	Electors (2024)
1	Sarguja	ST	18,20,880
2	Raigarh	ST	18,40,847
3	Janjgir–Champa	SC	20,58,260
4	Korba	None	16,20,051
5	Bilaspur	None	21,03,937
6	Rajnandgaon	None	18,69,229
7	Durg	None	20,92,551
8	Raipur	None	23,76,030
9	Mahasamund	None	17,63,698
10	Bastar	ST	14,73,810
11	Kanker	ST	16,59,374

== Dadra and Nagar Haveli and Daman and Diu (2) ==
Constituency of Dadra and Nagar Haveli

Constituency of Daman and Diu

Constituency		Reserved for (SC/ST/None)	Electors (2024)
No.	Name	Reserved for (SC/ST/None)	Electors (2024)
1	Daman and Diu	None	1,34,201
2	Dadra and Nagar Haveli	ST	2,83,035

== NCT of Delhi (7) ==
Constituencies of National Capital Territory of Delhi

Constituency		Reserved for (SC/ST/None)	Electors (2024)
No.	Name	Reserved for (SC/ST/None)	Electors (2024)
1	Chandni Chowk	None	16,46,467
2	North East Delhi	None	24,64,397
3	East Delhi	None	21,21,610
4	New Delhi	None	15,26,694
5	North West Delhi	SC	25,69,274
6	West Delhi	None	25,92,498
7	South Delhi	None	22,93,698

== Goa (2) ==
Constituencies of Goa

Constituency		Reserved for (SC/ST/None)	Electors (2024)
No.	Name	Reserved for (SC/ST/None)	Electors (2024)
1	North Goa	None	5,80,710
2	South Goa	None	5,98,934

== Gujarat (26) ==
Constituencies of Gujarat

Constituency		Reserved for (SC/ST/None)	Electors (2024)
No.	Name	Reserved for (SC/ST/None)	Electors (2024)
1	Kachchh	SC	19,43,633
2	Banaskantha	None	19,63,312
3	Patan	None	20,21,772
4	Mahesana	None	17,72,048
5	Sabarkantha	None	19,80,797
6	Gandhinagar	None	21,83,402
7	Ahmedabad East	None	20,40,263
8	Ahmedabad West	SC	17,27,645
9	Surendranagar	None	20,35,001
10	Rajkot	None	21,12,726
11	Porbandar	None	17,69,594
12	Jamnagar	None	18,18,959
13	Junagadh	None	17,96,532
14	Amreli	None	17,33,367
15	Bhavnagar	None	19,18,394
16	Anand	None	17,80,709
17	Kheda	None	20,08,281
18	Panchmahal	None	18,98,234
19	Dahod	ST	18,76,247
20	Vadodara	None	19,50,123
21	Chhota Udaipur	ST	18,22,437
22	Bharuch	None	17,23,670
23	Bardoli	ST	20,48,788
24	Surat	None	17,86,287
25	Navsari	None	22,23,804
26	Valsad	ST	18,60,207

== Haryana (10) ==
Constituencies of Haryana

Constituency		Reserved for (SC/ST/None)	Electors (2024)
No.	Name	Reserved for (SC/ST/None)	Electors (2024)
1	Ambala	SC	20,03,510
2	Kurukshetra	None	17,99,822
3	Sirsa	SC	19,41,319
4	Hisar	None	17,99,539
5	Karnal	None	21,09,702
6	Sonipat	None	17,77,008
7	Rohtak	None	19,13,628
8	Bhiwani–Mahendragarh	None	18,21,764
9	Gurgaon	None	25,84,982
10	Faridabad	None	24,36,637

== Himachal Pradesh (4) ==
Constituencies of Himachal Pradesh

Constituency		Reserved for (SC/ST/None)	Electors (2024)
No.	Name	Reserved for (SC/ST/None)	Electors (2024)
1	Kangra	None	15,24,032
2	Mandi	None	13,77,173
3	Hamirpur	None	14,56,099
4	Shimla	SC	13,54,665

== Jammu and Kashmir (5) ==
Constituencies of Jammu and Kashmir

Constituency		Reserved for (SC/ST/None)	Electors (2024)
No.	Name	Reserved for (SC/ST/None)	Electors (2024)
1	Baramulla	None	17,44,525
2	Srinagar	None	17,48,803
3	Anantnag–Rajouri	None	18,49,517
4	Udhampur	None	16,40,846
5	Jammu	None	18,18,657

== Jharkhand (14) ==
Constituencies of Jharkhand

Constituency		Reserved for (SC/ST/None)	Electors (2024)
No.	Name	Reserved for (SC/ST/None)	Electors (2024)
1	Rajmahal	ST	17,05,708
2	Dumka	ST	15,92,192
3	Godda	None	20,30,444
4	Chatra	None	16,92,698
5	Koderma	None	22,07,845
6	Giridih	None	18,66,763
7	Dhanbad	None	22,90,354
8	Ranchi	None	22,02,528
9	Jamshedpur	None	18,71,388
10	Singhbhum	ST	14,49,471
11	Khunti	ST	13,29,423
12	Lohardaga	ST	14,48,225
13	Palamu	SC	22,48,082
14	Hazaribagh	None	19,42,771

== Karnataka (28) ==
Constituencies of Karnataka

Constituency		Reserved for (SC/ST/None)	Electors (2024)
No.	Name	Reserved for (SC/ST/None)	Electors (2024)
1	Chikkodi	None	17,70,523
2	Belgaum	None	19,31,746
3	Bagalkot	None	18,10,090
4	Bijapur	SC	19,47,976
5	Gulbarga	SC	20,98,778
6	Raichur	ST	20,10,441
7	Bidar	None	18,94,364
8	Koppal	None	18,67,016
9	Bellary	ST	18,84,472
10	Haveri	None	17,94,394
11	Dharwad	None	18,34,015
12	Uttara Kannada	None	16,45,721
13	Davanagere	None	17,09,809
14	Shimoga	None	17,53,615
15	Udupi Chikmagalur	None	15,85,721
16	Hassan	None	17,38,818
17	Dakshina Kannada	None	18,18,127
18	Chitradurga	SC	18,57,385
19	Tumkur	None	16,61,834
20	Mandya	None	17,80,149
21	Mysore	None	20,94,310
22	Chamarajanagar	SC	17,78,667
23	Bangalore Rural	None	28,02,956
24	Bangalore North	None	32,15,291
25	Bangalore Central	None	24,34,254
26	Bangalore South	None	23,41,895
27	Chikballapur	None	19,81,767
28	Kolar	SC	17,28,198

== Kerala (20) ==
Constituencies of Kerala

Constituency		Reserved for (SC/ST/None)	Electors (2024)
No.	Name	Reserved for (SC/ST/None)	Electors (2024)
1	Kasaragod	None	14,55,530
2	Kannur	None	13,63,080
3	Vatakara	None	14,24,792
4	Wayanad	None	14,64,472
5	Kozhikode	None	14,32,508
6	Malappuram	None	14,80,714
7	Ponnani	None	14,71,260
8	Palakkad	None	14,00,914
9	Alathur	SC	13,40,183
10	Thrissur	None	14,83,783
11	Chalakudy	None	13,11,257
12	Ernakulam	None	13,24,757
13	Idukki	None	12,51,172
14	Kottayam	None	12,56,138
15	Alappuzha	None	14,06,689
16	Mavelikara	SC	13,39,159
17	Pathanamthitta	None	14,33,956
18	Kollam	None	13,30,873
19	Attingal	None	14,01,114
20	Thiruvananthapuram	None	14,34,657

== Ladakh (1) ==
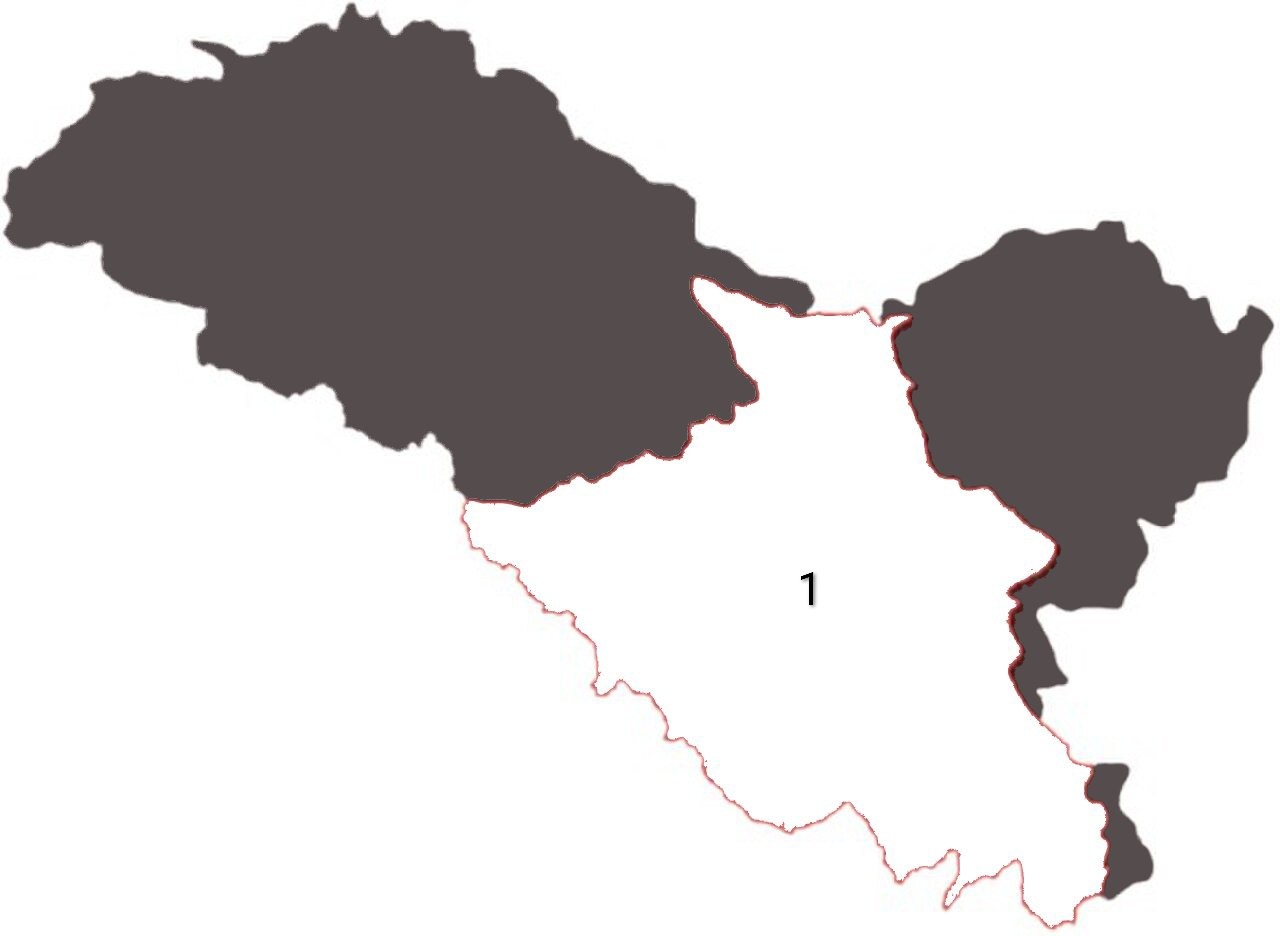
Constituency of Ladakh

Constituency		Reserved for (SC/ST/None)	Electors (2024)
No.	Name	Reserved for (SC/ST/None)	Electors (2024)
1	Ladakh	None	1,90,576

== Lakshadweep (1) ==
Constituency of Lakshadweep

Constituency		Reserved for (SC/ST/None)	Electors (2024)
No.	Name	Reserved for (SC/ST/None)	Electors (2024)
1	Lakshadweep	ST	57,953

== Madhya Pradesh (29) ==
Constituencies of Madhya Pradesh

Constituency		Reserved for (SC/ST/None)	Electors (2024)
No.	Name	Reserved for (SC/ST/None)	Electors (2024)
1	Morena	None	20,15,928
2	Bhind	SC	19,13,389
3	Gwalior	None	21,60,206
4	Guna	None	18,90,695
5	Sagar	None	17,46,640
6	Tikamgarh	SC	18,27,976
7	Damoh	None	19,26,000
8	Khajuraho	None	19,98,536
9	Satna	None	17,08,823
10	Rewa	None	18,59,439
11	Sidhi	None	20,30,095
12	Shahdol	ST	17,78,158
13	Jabalpur	None	18,98,180
14	Mandla	ST	21,03,244
15	Balaghat	None	18,75,760
16	Chhindwara	None	16,34,721
17	Hoshangabad	None	18,58,158
18	Vidisha	None	19,46,631
19	Bhopal	None	23,39,411
20	Rajgarh	None	18,76,672
21	Dewas	SC	19,43,559
22	Ujjain	SC	18,00,347
23	Mandsaur	None	19,00,808
24	Ratlam	ST	20,95,109
25	Dhar	ST	19,55,117
26	Indore	None	25,27,978
27	Khargone	ST	20,46,409
28	Khandwa	None	21,12,874
29	Betul	ST	18,97,989

== Maharashtra (48) ==
Constituencies of Maharashtra

Constituency		Reserved for (SC/ST/None)	Electors (2024)
No.	Name	Reserved for (SC/ST/None)	Electors (2024)
1	Nandurbar	ST	19,71,324
2	Dhule	None	20,25,275
3	Jalgaon	None	20,00,402
4	Raver	None	18,23,827
5	Buldhana	None	17,87,095
6	Akola	None	18,94,657
7	Amravati	SC	18,38,767
8	Wardha	None	16,84,292
9	Ramtek	SC	20,50,952
10	Nagpur	None	22,24,282
11	Bhandara–Gondiya	None	18,30,399
12	Gadchiroli–Chimur	ST	16,18,690
13	Chandrapur	None	18,39,760
14	Yavatmal–Washim	None	19,42,461
15	Hingoli	None	18,19,082
16	Nanded	None	18,53,532
17	Parbhani	None	21,24,497
18	Jalna	None	19,69,953
19	Aurangabad	None	20,61,220
20	Dindori	ST	18,57,924
21	Nashik	None	20,33,175
22	Palghar	ST	21,48,850
23	Bhiwandi	None	20,87,604
24	Kalyan	None	20,82,800
25	Thane	None	25,08,072
26	Mumbai North	None	18,12,115
27	Mumbai North West	None	17,35,295
28	Mumbai North East	None	16,37,292
29	Mumbai North Central	None	17,44,297
30	Mumbai South Central	None	14,74,660
31	Mumbai South	None	15,36,443
32	Raigad	None	16,69,722
33	Maval	None	25,85,776
34	Pune	None	20,62,172
35	Baramati	None	23,74,884
36	Shirur	None	25,41,750
37	Ahmednagar	None	19,88,934
38	Shirdi	SC	16,80,067
39	Beed	None	21,47,063
40	Osmanabad	None	19,96,484
41	Latur	SC	19,80,409
42	Solapur	SC	20,31,921
43	Madha	None	19,96,298
44	Sangli	None	18,74,176
45	Satara	None	18,99,325
46	Ratnagiri–Sindhudurg	None	14,52,664
47	Kolhapur	None	19,42,725
48	Hatkanangle	None	18,18,396

== Manipur (2) ==
Constituencies of Manipur

Constituency		Reserved for (SC/ST/None)	Electors (2024)
No.	Name	Reserved for (SC/ST/None)	Electors (2024)
1	Inner Manipur	None	10,01,115
2	Outer Manipur	ST	10,50,242

== Meghalaya (2) ==
Constituencies of Meghalaya

Constituency		Reserved for (SC/ST/None)	Electors (2024)
No.	Name	Reserved for (SC/ST/None)	Electors (2024)
1	Shillong	ST	14,02,892
2	Tura	ST	8,27,559

== Mizoram (1) ==
Constituency of Mizoram

Constituency		Reserved for (SC/ST/None)	Electors (2024)
No.	Name	Reserved for (SC/ST/None)	Electors (2024)
1	Mizoram	ST	8,61,327

== Nagaland (1) ==
Constituency of Nagaland

Constituency		Reserved for (SC/ST/None)	Electors (2024)
No.	Name	Reserved for (SC/ST/None)	Electors (2024)
1	Nagaland	None	13,25,383

== Odisha (21) ==
Constituencies of Odisha

Constituency		Reserved for (SC/ST/None)	Electors (2024)
No.	Name	Reserved for (SC/ST/None)	Electors (2024)
1	Bargarh	None	16,33,893
2	Sundargarh	ST	15,79,096
3	Sambalpur	None	15,01,538
4	Keonjhar	ST	15,89,941
5	Mayurbhanj	ST	15,46,274
6	Balasore	None	16,10,043
7	Bhadrak	SC	17,73,928
8	Jajpur	SC	15,48,594
9	Dhenkanal	None	15,33,702
10	Bolangir	None	18,03,544
11	Kalahandi	None	17,02,038
12	Nabarangpur	ST	15,14,610
13	Kandhamal	None	13,40,580
14	Cuttack	None	15,74,979
15	Kendrapara	None	17,95,725
16	Jagatsinghpur	SC	17,03,489
17	Puri	None	15,89,698
18	Bhubaneswar	None	16,75,019
19	Aska	None	16,23,404
20	Berhampur	None	15,95,228
21	Koraput	ST	14,81,642

== Puducherry (1) ==
Constituency of Puducherry

Constituency		Reserved for (SC/ST/None)	Electors (2024)
No.	Name	Reserved for (SC/ST/None)	Electors (2024)
1	Puducherry	None	10,24,024

== Punjab (13) ==
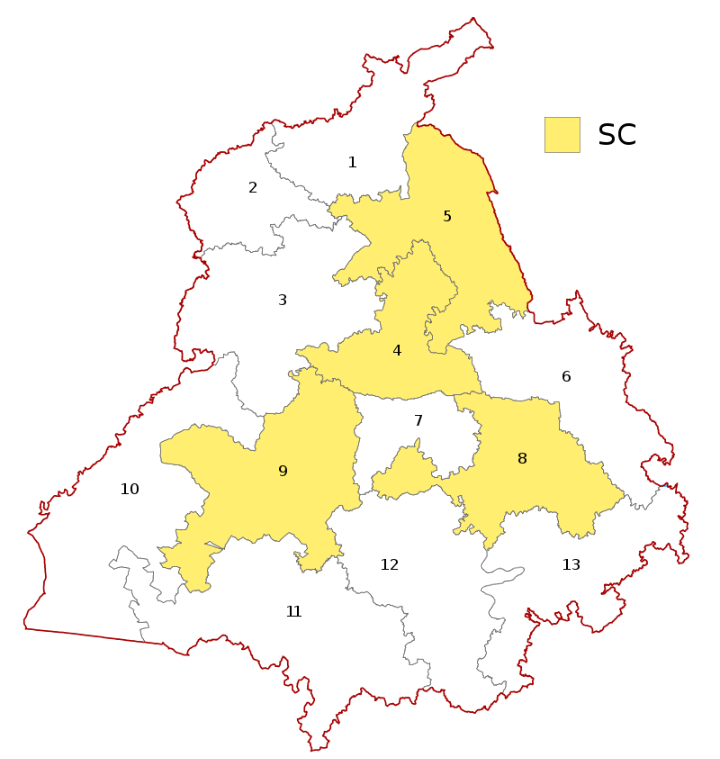
Constituencies of Punjab

Constituency		Reserved for (SC/ST/None)	Electors (2024)
No.	Name	Reserved for (SC/ST/None)	Electors (2024)
1	Gurdaspur	None	16,27,611
2	Amritsar	None	16,17,542
3	Khadoor Sahib	None	16,80,035
4	Jalandhar	SC	16,55,868
5	Hoshiarpur	SC	16,18,186
6	Anandpur Sahib	None	17,40,606
7	Ludhiana	None	17,60,756
8	Fatehgarh Sahib	SC	15,57,201
9	Faridkot	SC	15,99,861
10	Firozpur	None	16,74,979
11	Bathinda	None	16,59,163
12	Sangrur	None	15,63,808
13	Patiala	None	18,11,580

== Rajasthan (25) ==
Constituencies of Rajasthan

Constituency		Reserved for (SC/ST/None)	Electors (2024)
No.	Name	Reserved for (SC/ST/None)	Electors (2024)
1	Ganganagar	SC	21,03,968
2	Bikaner	SC	20,50,748
3	Churu	None	22,22,213
4	Jhunjhunu	None	20,97,732
5	Sikar	None	22,32,334
6	Jaipur Rural	None	21,94,555
7	Jaipur	None	22,88,793
8	Alwar	None	20,75,093
9	Bharatpur	SC	21,24,971
10	Karauli–Dholpur	SC	19,80,182
11	Dausa	ST	19,03,520
12	Tonk–Sawai Madhopur	None	21,50,616
13	Ajmer	None	19,99,399
14	Nagaur	None	21,55,502
15	Pali	None	23,48,274
16	Jodhpur	None	21,38,241
17	Barmer	None	22,08,630
18	Jalore	None	22,97,692
19	Udaipur	ST	22,31,240
20	Banswara	ST	22,00,607
21	Chittorgarh	None	21,70,738
22	Rajsamand	None	20,64,478
23	Bhilwara	None	21,48,657
24	Kota	None	20,88,853
25	Jhalawar–Baran	None	20,30,974

== Sikkim (1) ==
Constituency of Sikkim

Constituency		Reserved for (SC/ST/None)	Electors (2024)
No.	Name	Reserved for (SC/ST/None)	Electors (2024)
1	Sikkim	None	4,66,643

== Tamil Nadu (39) ==
Constituencies of Tamil Nadu

Constituency		Reserved for (SC/ST/None)	Electors (2024)
No.	Name	Reserved for (SC/ST/None)	Electors (2024)
1	Thiruvallur	SC	20,86,686
2	Chennai North	None	14,96,459
3	Chennai South	None	20,23,381
4	Chennai Central	None	13,50,334
5	Sriperumbudur	None	23,82,578
6	Kancheepuram	SC	17,49,192
7	Arakkonam	None	15,68,140
8	Vellore	None	15,34,347
9	Krishnagiri	None	16,27,851
10	Dharmapuri	None	15,26,799
11	Tiruvannamalai	None	15,36,993
12	Arani	None	14,99,659
13	Villupuram	SC	15,03,959
14	Kallakurichi	None	15,69,097
15	Salem	None	16,59,269
16	Namakkal	None	14,52,952
17	Erode	None	15,38,960
18	Tiruppur	None	16,08,720
19	Nilgiris	SC	14,28,889
20	Coimbatore	None	21,06,500
21	Pollachi	None	15,97,717
22	Dindigul	None	16,08,624
23	Karur	None	14,30,499
24	Tiruchirappalli	None	15,54,620
25	Perambalur	None	14,47,197
26	Cuddalore	None	14,13,170
27	Chidambaram	SC	15,20,970
28	Mayiladuthurai	None	15,46,075
29	Nagapattinam	SC	13,45,708
30	Thanjavur	None	15,02,056
31	Sivaganga	None	16,35,655
32	Madurai	None	15,83,250
33	Theni	None	16,30,328
34	Virudhunagar	None	15,05,927
35	Ramanathapuram	None	16,19,761
36	Thoothukkudi	None	14,61,182
37	Tenkasi	SC	15,29,130
38	Tirunelveli	None	16,56,265
39	Kanniyakumari	None	15,66,048

== Telangana (17) ==
Constituencies of Telangana

Constituency		Reserved for (SC/ST/None)	Electors (2024)
No.	Name	Reserved for (SC/ST/None)	Electors (2024)
1	Adilabad	ST	16,52,394
2	Peddapalle	SC	15,97,892
3	Karimnagar	None	17,98,168
4	Nizamabad	None	17,05,591
5	Zahirabad	None	16,42,425
6	Medak	None	18,28,717
7	Malkajgiri	None	37,80,453
8	Secunderabad	None	21,20,550
9	Hyderabad	None	22,17,305
10	Chevella	None	29,39,057
11	Mahbubnagar	None	16,83,709
12	Nagarkurnool	SC	17,39,310
13	Nalgonda	None	17,26,204
14	Bhongir	None	18,09,241
15	Warangal	SC	18,25,492
16	Mahabubabad	ST	15,33,858
17	Khammam	None	16,31,952

== Tripura (2) ==
Constituencies of Tripura

Constituency		Reserved for (SC/ST/None)	Electors (2024)
No.	Name	Reserved for (SC/ST/None)	Electors (2024)
1	Tripura West	None	14,69,453
2	Tripura East	ST	14,01,443

== Uttar Pradesh (80) ==
Constituencies of Uttar Pradesh

Constituency		Reserved for (SC/ST/None)	Electors (2024)
No.	Name	Reserved for (SC/ST/None)	Electors (2024)
1	Saharanpur	None	18,57,816
2	Kairana	None	17,27,579
3	Muzaffarnagar	None	18,23,717
4	Bijnor	None	17,43,213
5	Nagina	SC	16,47,310
6	Moradabad	None	20,62,642
7	Rampur	None	17,33,243
8	Sambhal	None	18,99,292
9	Amroha	None	17,20,677
10	Meerut	None	20,05,669
11	Baghpat	None	16,65,208
12	Ghaziabad	None	29,48,720
13	Gautam Buddha Nagar	None	26,81,482
14	Bulandshahr	SC	18,67,981
15	Aligarh	None	20,02,868
16	Hathras	SC	19,46,138
17	Mathura	None	19,39,130
18	Agra	SC	20,75,821
19	Fatehpur Sikri	None	18,07,314
20	Firozabad	None	18,96,052
21	Mainpuri	None	17,98,051
22	Etah	None	17,03,935
23	Badaun	None	20,10,304
24	Aonla	None	18,93,622
25	Bareilly	None	19,26,167
26	Pilibhit	None	18,33,961
27	Shahjahanpur	SC	23,33,143
28	Kheri	None	18,71,224
29	Dhaurahra	None	17,19,979
30	Sitapur	None	17,60,367
31	Hardoi	SC	19,11,779
32	Misrikh	SC	18,79,798
33	Unnao	None	23,44,843
34	Mohanlalganj	SC	21,89,866
35	Lucknow	None	21,73,953
36	Rae Bareli	None	17,88,731
37	Amethi	None	17,98,715
38	Sultanpur	None	18,55,602
39	Pratapgarh	None	18,36,748
40	Farrukhabad	None	17,51,985
41	Etawah	SC	18,34,489
42	Kannauj	None	19,93,616
43	Kanpur	None	16,64,794
44	Akbarpur	None	18,75,912
45	Jalaun	SC	20,10,583
46	Jhansi	None	21,62,404
47	Hamirpur	None	18,41,604
48	Banda	None	17,49,034
49	Fatehpur	None	19,42,597
50	Kaushambi	SC	19,12,536
51	Phulpur	None	20,71,536
52	Allahabad	None	18,28,159
53	Barabanki	SC	19,19,282
54	Faizabad	None	19,29,399
55	Ambedkar Nagar	None	19,13,756
56	Bahraich	SC	18,39,281
57	Kaiserganj	None	19,06,032
58	Shrawasti	None	19,80,743
59	Gonda	None	18,43,873
60	Domariyaganj	None	19,62,205
61	Basti	None	19,04,843
62	Sant Kabir Nagar	None	20,76,050
63	Maharajganj	None	20,07,065
64	Gorakhpur	None	21,01,746
65	Kushi Nagar	None	18,76,962
66	Deoria	None	18,77,227
67	Bansgaon	SC	18,25,711
68	Lalganj	SC	18,41,110
69	Azamgarh	None	18,71,946
70	Ghosi	None	20,90,637
71	Salempur	None	17,84,412
72	Ballia	None	19,36,995
73	Jaunpur	None	19,79,004
74	Machhlishahr	SC	19,43,763
75	Ghazipur	None	20,88,636
76	Chandauli	None	18,50,547
77	Varanasi	None	19,99,861
78	Bhadohi	None	20,39,941
79	Mirzapur	None	19,09,448
80	Robertsganj	SC	17,80,728

== Uttarakhand (5) ==
Constituencies of Uttarakhand

Constituency		Reserved for (SC/ST/None)	Electors (2024)
No.	Name	Reserved for (SC/ST/None)	Electors (2024)
1	Tehri Garhwal	None	15,90,526
2	Garhwal	None	14,04,233
3	Almora	SC	13,68,432
4	Nainital–Udhamsingh Nagar	None	20,26,438
5	Haridwar	None	20,41,472

== West Bengal (42) ==
Constituencies of West Bengal

Constituency		Reserved for (SC/ST/None)	Electors (2024)
No.	Name	Reserved for (SC/ST/None)	Electors (2024)
1	Cooch Behar	SC	19,70,743
2	Alipurduars	ST	17,78,463
3	Jalpaiguri	SC	18,89,840
4	Darjeeling	None	17,76,898
5	Raiganj	None	17,91,574
6	Balurghat	None	15,63,941
7	Maldaha Uttar	None	18,64,285
8	Maldaha Dakshin	None	17,84,407
9	Jangipur	None	18,07,556
10	Baharampur	None	17,89,424
11	Murshidabad	None	18,90,589
12	Krishnanagar	None	17,62,599
13	Ranaghat	SC	18,77,599
14	Bangaon	SC	18,41,292
15	Barrackpore	None	15,12,101
16	Dum Dum	None	17,00,882
17	Barasat	None	19,07,604
18	Basirhat	None	18,05,874
19	Jaynagar	SC	18,45,363
20	Mathurapur	SC	18,18,113
21	Diamond Harbour	None	18,81,552
22	Jadavpur	None	20,34,251
23	Kolkata Dakshin	None	18,50,115
24	Kolkata Uttar	None	15,05,686
25	Howrah	None	17,69,973
26	Uluberia	None	17,42,388
27	Srerampur	None	19,28,256
28	Hooghly	None	18,60,103
29	Arambagh	SC	18,85,001
30	Tamluk	None	18,53,363
31	Kanthi	None	17,97,658
32	Ghatal	None	19,42,313
33	Jhargram	ST	17,82,435
34	Medinipur	None	18,13,205
35	Purulia	None	18,25,625
36	Bankura	None	17,85,138
37	Bishnupur	SC	17,58,481
38	Bardhaman Purba	SC	18,03,240
39	Bardhaman–Durgapur	None	18,53,336
40	Asansol	None	17,71,875
41	Bolpur	SC	18,42,192
42	Birbhum	None	18,59,447

== See also ==
- List of former constituencies of the Lok Sabha
- State governments of India
