= Jawala Prasad Jyotishi =

Indian politician

Jwala Prasad Jyotishi

Member of Parliament
- In office 1957–1967
- Preceded by: Sodia Khubchand Daryao Singh
- Succeeded by: Ramsingh Ayarwal
- Constituency: Sagar (Lok Sabha constituency)

Member of Legislative Assembly
- In office 1972–1977
- Preceded by: D. Jain
- Succeeded by: ShivkumarJwalaprasad
- Constituency: Sagar

Personal details
- Born: 14 March 1909 Kareli, Madhya Pradesh
- Died: 10 September 1997 (aged 88) Sagar, Madhya Pradesh
- Party: Indian National Congress
- Spouse: Laxmi Devi Jyotishi (m. 1934)
- Children: 4 Son & 2 Daughter
- Parent: Pandit Jhumak Lal Jyotishi (Father)
- Education: M.A.
- Alma mater: Robertson College, Jabalpur & Law College, Nagpur & Nagpur University
- Occupation: Politician & Social worker

Jawala Prasad Jyotishi (born 14 March 1909) was an Indian politician from the Indian National Congress party. He was a member of the 2nd & 3rd Lok sabha of India. He won the 1957 & 1962 General election of India from Sagar Lok Sabha constituency.

He was also a Member of Legislative Assembly of Sagar Vidhan Sabha between 1972 and 1977.

Pandit Jwala Prasad Jyotishi Institute of Performing and Fine Arts is being run in his name. The institute is located at Civil Lines, Sagar (M.P).
