= Bhupendra Singh (Madhya Pradesh politician) =

Indian politician

Bhupendra Singh dangi

Member of Legislative Assembly from Madhya Pradesh
- Incumbent
- Assumed office December 2013
- Preceded by: Arunodaya Choubey
- Constituency: Khurai

Minister of Home and Transport, Madhya Pradesh Government
- In office 21 December 2013 – 11 December 2018
- Succeeded by: Govind Singh Rajput; Bala Bachchan

Member of the Parliament In Lok Sabha
- In office 2009–2013
- Preceded by: Virendra Kumar
- Succeeded by: Laxmi Narayan Yadav
- Constituency: Sagar

Personal details
- Born: 20 May 1960 (age 66) Bamora, Madhya Pradesh, India
- Party: Bharatiya Janata Party
- Education: Bachelor of Laws
- Alma mater: Sagar University
- Occupation: Politician

Bhupendra Singh (born 20 May 1960) is an Indian politician and a former minister in charge of Home Affairs, IT & Transport as well as Urban Development and Housing in Government of Madhya Pradesh.

From 2013 to December 2018, he was a cabinet minister in the Government of Madhya Pradesh, for the IT and transport department, later in 2016 his IT department has been switched with home department after Babulal Gaur skipped the post. In the 2009 general election, he was elected to the 15th Lok Sabha from the Sagar Lok Sabha constituency of Madhya Pradesh after two consecutive losses in assembly elections 2003 & 2008 from Surkhi & Khurai respectively.

He was also a member of Madhya Pradesh Legislative Assembly during 1993-2003 from Surkhi.

Currently he is ex-minister for Urban Development & Housing, Govt. of M.P.
