= Virendra Kumar Khatik =

Indian politician (born 1954)

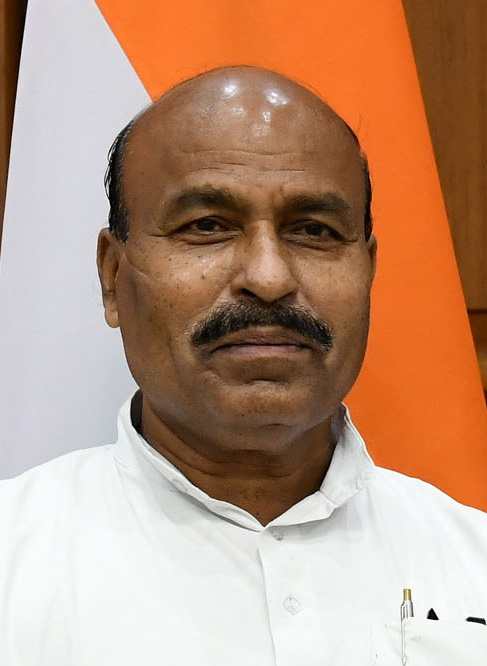
- Official portrait, 2021

Union Minister of Social Justice and Empowerment
- Incumbent
- Assumed office 7 July 2021
- President: Ram Nath Kovind; Droupadi Murmu
- Prime Minister: Narendra Modi
- Preceded by: Thawar Chand Gehlot

Pro-tem Speaker of 17th Lok Sabha
- In office 17 June 2019 – 19 June 2019
- President: Ram Nath Kovind
- Prime Minister: Narendra Modi
- Preceded by: Kamal Nath (Note: Sumitra Mahajan as Speaker)
- Succeeded by: Bhartruhari Mahtab (Note: Om Birla as Speaker)

Union Minister of State for Women and Child Development
- In office 3 September 2017 – 30 May 2019
- Prime Minister: Narendra Modi
- Minister: Maneka Gandhi
- Preceded by: Krishna Raj
- Succeeded by: Debasree Chaudhuri

Union Minister of State for Minority Affairs
- In office 3 September 2017 – 30 May 2019
- Prime Minister: Narendra Modi
- Minister: Mukhtar Abbas Naqvi
- Preceded by: Mukhtar Abbas Naqvi
- Succeeded by: Kiren Rijiju

Member of Parliament, Lok Sabha
- Incumbent
- Assumed office 1 June 2009
- Preceded by: Nathu Ram Ahirwar
- Constituency: Tikamgarh, Madhya Pradesh
- In office 1996–2009
- Preceded by: Anand Ahirwar
- Succeeded by: Bhupendra Singh
- Constituency: Sagar, Madhya Pradesh

Personal details
- Born: 27 February 1954 (age 72) Sagar, Madhya Pradesh, India
- Party: Bharatiya Janata Party
- Spouse: Kamal Khatik (m. 1987)
- Children: 2
- Education: PhD
- Alma mater: Dr. Hari Singh Gour University
- As of 18 June, 2019

Virendra Kumar Khatik (born 27 February 1954; Hindi pronunciation: [ʋiːɾeːn̪d̪ɾə kʊmaːɾ kʰəʈiːk]) is an Indian politician who is serving as the 29th Minister of Social Justice and Empowerment since 2024. He is a Member of Parliament in the 17th Lok Sabha from Tikamgarh.

He was also the chairperson of the Standing Committee on Labour and a Member of the General Purpose Committee. He was chosen as the Pro-tem speaker of the 17th Lok Sabha in June 2019.

== Personal life ==
Khatik was born in Sagar, Madhya Pradesh on 27 February 1954 to Amar Singh and Sumat Rani. From fifth standard onwards, he studied at Sagar and did his higher studies at Dr. Hari Singh Gour University, from where he did his MA (Economics), followed by PhD (Child Labour) in 2007.

He married Kamal Khatik on 21 February 1987, with whom he has a son and three daughters. Former cabinet minister Gauri Shankar Shejwar is his brother-in-law.

== Political career ==
In the 11th, 12th, 13th, and 14th Lok Sabha, he represented the Sagar constituency of Madhya Pradesh between 1996 and 2009. In the 15th, 16th, and 17th Lok Sabha, he represented the Tikamgarh constituency of Madhya Pradesh. He held different posts in Rashtriya Swayamsevak Sangh (RSS), Akhil Bharatiya Vidyarthi Parishad (ABVP), and the political party Bharatiya Janata Party (BJP).

He became Minister of Social Justice and Empowerment in Second Modi ministry when cabinet overhaul happened.

== See also ==
- Third Modi ministry

Lok Sabha
Preceded by Anand Ahirwar	Member of Parliament for Sagar; 1996 – 2009	Succeeded by Bhupendra Singh
Preceded by Constituency does not exist	Member of Parliament for Tikamgarh; 2009 – Present	Incumbent
Political offices
Preceded by Thawar Chand Gehlot	Minister of Social Justice and Empowerment; 7 July 2021 - Present	Incumbent
