= Raj Bahadur Singh =

Member of the 17th Lok Sabha

Member of Parliament, Lok Sabha
- In office 2019–2024
- Preceded by: Laxmi Narayan Yadav
- Constituency: Sagar

Personal details
- Born: 29 December 1967 (age 58) Richhavar, Madhya Pradesh, India
- Party: Bharatiya Janata Party
- Spouse: Roshni Singh
- Children: 2 sons
- Parent(s): Anurudh Pratap Singh, Geeta Bai
- Education: B.Sc., MA (History)
- Profession: Politician

Raj Bahadur Singh (born 29 December 1967; Hindi pronunciation: [ɾaːd͡ʒ bəɦaːd̪ʊɾ sɪŋgʱ]) is an Indian politician and member of the 17th Lok Sabha, representing Sagar constituency, Madhya Pradesh. He was born in Sagar and is a member of the Bharatiya Janata Party.
