= Tikamgarh Lok Sabha constituency =

Lok Sabha constituency in Madhya Pradesh

Coordinates: 24.75°N 78.80°E

Tikamgarh
- Lok Sabha constituency
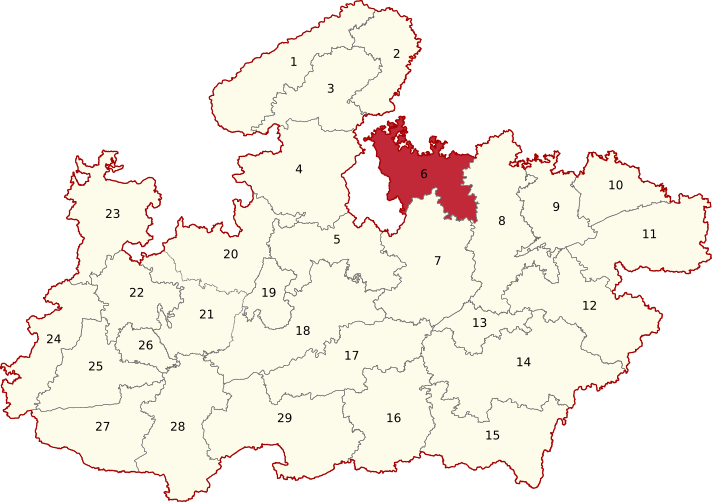
- Tikamgarh Lok Sabha constituency within Madhya Pradesh

Constituency details
- Country: India
- Region: Central India
- State: Madhya Pradesh
- Assembly constituencies: Tikamgarh; Jatara; Prithvipur; Niwari; Khargapur; Maharajpur; Chhatarpur; Bijawar
- Established: 1952
- Total electors: 18,26,585
- Reservation: SC

Member of Parliament
- 18th Lok Sabha
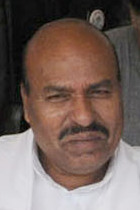
- Incumbent Virendra Kumar Khatik; Union Minister of Social Justice and Empowerment
- Party: Bharatiya Janata Party
- Elected year: 2024

Tikamgarh is one of the 29 Lok Sabha (parliamentary) constituencies in Madhya Pradesh state in central India. This constituency came into existence in 2008 as a part of the implementation of the delimitation of parliamentary constituencies. It is reserved for the candidates belonging to the scheduled castes.

The constituency covers the entire Tikamgarh district and Niwari district and part of Chhatarpur district. Before delimitation, Tikamgarh, Jatara, Niwari, Khargapur, Maharajpur, Chhatarpur and Bijawar Vidhan Sabha segments were part of the erstwhile Khajuraho Lok Sabha constituency. As per census Tikamgarh District has a population of 1,445,166 in 2011 out of which 760,355 are male and 684,811 are female. Population of Tikamgarh District in 2020/2021 is 1,616,201 (estimates as per aadhar uidai.gov.in feb 2019 data). Literate people are 747,940 out of 459,353 are male and 288,587 are female. People living in Tikamgarh District depend on multiple skills, total workers are 655,318 out of which men are 402,776 and women are 252,542. Total 251,049 Cultivators are depended on agriculture farming out of 187,192 are cultivated by men and 63,857 are women. 126,209 people works in agricultural land as labor, men are 75,717 and 50,492 are women. Tikamgarh District sex ratio is 901 females per 1000 of males.

== Assembly segments ==
Tikamgarh Lok Sabha constituency comprises eight Vidhan Sabha (Legislative Assembly) segments. These are:

#	Name	District	Member	Party	2024 Lead
43	Tikamgarh	Tikamgarh	Yadvendra Singh	INC	BJP
44	Jatara (SC)	Tikamgarh	Harishankar Khatik	BJP	BJP
45	Prithvipur	Niwari	Nitendra Singh Rathore	INC	BJP
46	Niwari	Niwari	Anil Jain	BJP	BJP
47	Khargapur	Tikamgarh	Chanda Gaur	INC	BJP
48	Maharajpur	Chhatarpur	Kamakhya Pratap Singh	BJP	BJP
51	Chhatarpur	Chhatarpur	Lalita Yadav	BJP	BJP
52	Bijawar	Chhatarpur	Babalu Rajesh Shukla	BJP	BJP

== Members of Parliament ==
Year	Member	Party
1952	Ram Sahai	Indian National Congress
1962	Kure Mate	Praja Socialist Party
1967	Nathu Ram Ahirwar	Indian National Congress
1971	Nathu Ram Ahirwar	Indian National Congress
1977–2008 : Constituency abolished
2009	Dr. Virendra Kumar Khatik	Bharatiya Janata Party
2014	Dr. Virendra Kumar Khatik	Bharatiya Janata Party
2019	Dr. Virendra Kumar Khatik	Bharatiya Janata Party
2024	Dr. Virendra Kumar Khatik	Bharatiya Janata Party

== Election results ==
=== General Elections 2024 ===
2024 Indian general election: Tikamgarh
Party	Candidate	Votes	%	±%
BJP	Virendra Kumar Khatik	715,050	65.1	▲3.8
INC	Pankaj Ahirwar	3,11,738	28.38	−1.18
BSP	Dalluram Ahirwar	32,673	2.97	new
RSPS	Pankaj Ahirwar	10,158	0.92	new
NOTA	None of the above	12,831	1.17	new
Majority		4,03,312	36.72	▲4.98
Turnout		10,96,023 (Note: does not include postal ballots)	60.00	▼6.62
BJP hold		Swing		

=== General Election 2019 ===
2019 Indian general elections: Tikamgarh
Party	Candidate	Votes	%	±%
BJP	Virendra Kumar Khatik	672,248	61.30	+6.1
INC	Kiran Ahirwar	3,24,189	29.56	+1.6
SP	R.D. Prajapati	42,585	3.88	−2.32
Majority		3,48,059	31.74	+4.5
Turnout		10,97,454	66.62	+16.46
BJP hold		Swing		

=== General Elections 2014 ===
2014 Indian general elections: Tikamgarh
Party	Candidate	Votes	%	±%
BJP	Virendra Kumar Khatik	422,979	55.20	+17.10
INC	Ahirwar Dr Kamlesh Verma	2,14,248	27.96	−2.17
SP	Dr. Ambesh Kumari Ahirwar	47,497	6.20	Steady
Majority		2,08,731	27.24	+19.32
Turnout		7,66,878	50.16	+6.74
BJP hold		Swing		

=== General Elections 2009 ===
2009 Indian general elections: Tikamgarh
Party	Candidate	Votes	%	±%
BJP	Virendra Kumar Khatik	200,109	38.10	new
INC	Ahirwar Vrindavan	1,58,247	30.13	new
SP	Chintaman Kori Rampuriya	47,497	6.20	new
Majority		41,862	7.92	
Turnout		5,25,180	43.42	new
BJP win (new seat)				

== See also ==
- Khajuraho (Lok Sabha constituency)
- Tikamgarh district
- List of constituencies of the Lok Sabha
