= Sagar Lok Sabha constituency =

Lok Sabha Constituency in Madhya Pradesh, India

Coordinates: 23.83°N 78.71°E

Sagar
- Lok Sabha constituency

Constituency details
- Country: India
- Region: Central India
- State: Madhya Pradesh
- Assembly constituencies: Bina; Khurai; Surkhi; Naryoli; Sagar; Kurwai; Sironj; Shamshabad
- Established: 1952
- Total electors: 17,45,690
- Reservation: None

Member of Parliament
- 18th Lok Sabha
- Incumbent Lata Wankhede
- Party: Bhartiya Janta Party
- Elected year: 2024

Sagar Lok Sabha constituency is one of the 29 Lok Sabha constituencies in the Indian state of Madhya Pradesh. This constituency has been reserved for the candidates belonging to the Scheduled Castes since 1967. It covers parts of Sagar and Vidisha districts.

== Assembly segments ==
Presently, Sagar Lok Sabha constituency comprises the following eight Vidhan Sabha (Legislative Assembly) segments:

#	Name	District	Member	Party	2024 Lead
35	Bina (SC)	Sagar	Nirmala Sapre	BJP	BJP
36	Khurai	Sagar	Bhupendra Singh	BJP	BJP
37	Surkhi	Sagar	Govind Singh Rajput	BJP	BJP
40	Naryoli (SC)	Sagar	Pradeep Lariya	BJP	BJP
41	Sagar	Sagar	Shailendra Kumar Jain	BJP	BJP
146	Kurwai (SC)	Vidisha	Hari Singh Sapre	BJP	BJP
147	Sironj	Vidisha	Umakant Sharma	BJP	BJP
148	Shamshabad	Vidisha	Suryaprakash Meena	BJP	BJP

== Members of Parliament ==
Year	Member	Party
1952	Khubchand Sodia	Indian National Congress
1957	Jawala Prasad Jyotishi	Indian National Congress
1962	Jawala Prasad Jyotishi	Indian National Congress
1967	Ramsingh Ayarwal	Bharatiya Jana Sangh
1971	Sahodrabai Rai	Indian National Congress
1977	Narmada Prasad Rai	Janata Party
1980	Sahodrabai Rai	Indian National Congress (I)
1981^	R. P. Ahirwar	Bharatiya Janata Party
1984	Nandlal Choudhary	Indian National Congress
1989	Shanker Lal Khatique	Bharatiya Janata Party
1991	Anand Ahirwar	Indian National Congress
1996	Virendra Khatik	Bharatiya Janata Party
1998	Virendra Khatik	Bharatiya Janata Party
1999	Virendra Khatik	Bharatiya Janata Party
2004	Virendra Khatik	Bharatiya Janata Party
2009	Bhupendra Singh	Bharatiya Janata Party
2014	Laxmi Narayan Yadav	Bharatiya Janata Party
2019	Rajbahadur Singh	Bharatiya Janata Party
2024	Lata Wankhede	Bharatiya Janata Party

^ By Poll

== Election results ==
=== 2024 ===
2024 Indian general election: Sagar
Party	Candidate	Votes	%	±%
BJP	Lata Wankhede	787,979	68.49	+6.18
INC	Chandra Bhusan Singh Bundela	3,16,757	27.53	−5.32
BSP	Bhagwati Prasad Jatav	16,636	1.45	−0.51
NOTA	None of the above	7,657	0.67	−0.17
Majority		471,222	40.96	+11.5
Turnout		11,47,866 (Note: does not include postal ballots)	65.75	▲0.21
BJP hold		Swing		

=== 2019 ===
2019 Indian general elections: Sagar
Party	Candidate	Votes	%	±%
BJP	Rajbahadur Singh	646,231	62.31	+8.21
INC	Prabhu Singh Thakur	3,40,689	32.85	−7.75
BSP	Rajkumar Yadav	20,363	1.96	−0.27
NOTA	None of the Above	8,733	0.84	−0.23
Majority		3,05,542	29.46	+15.93
Turnout		10,37,536	65.54	
BJP hold		Swing		

=== 2014 ===
2014 Indian general elections: Sagar
Party	Candidate	Votes	%	±%
BJP	Laxmi Narayan Yadav	482,580	54.10	
INC	Govind Singh Rajput	3,61,843	40.6	
BSP	Saroj Katiyar	19,917	2.23	
NOTA	None of the Above	9,504	1.07	
Majority		1,20,737	13.53	
Turnout		8,92,000	58.67	
BJP hold		Swing		

=== 2009 ===
2009 Indian general elections: Sagar
Party	Candidate	Votes	%	±%
BJP	Bhupendra Singh	323,954	56.80	
INC	Aslam Sher Khan	1,92,786	33.80	
SP	Gouri Singh Yadav	12,716	2.23	
BSP	Ahirwar Naresh Boudha	12,703	2.23	
Majority		1,31,168	23.00	
Turnout		5,70,321	48.12	
BJP hold		Swing		

== See also ==
- Sagar district
- List of constituencies of the Lok Sabha
