= Dr. Hari Singh Gour University =

Central university in Sagar, Madhya Pradesh, India

Doctor Hari Singh Gour University
- Former name: University of Sagar
- Motto: Asato mā sadgamaya
- Type: Central University
- Established: 18 July 1946; 80 years ago
- Founder: Hari Singh Gour
- Affiliations: UGC; NAAC
- Chancellor: Kanhaiya Lal Berwal, IPS (Retd.)
- Vice-Chancellor: Dr. Yashwant Singh Thakur (acting)
- Visitor: President of India
- Faculty: 292
- Students: 2,804
- Undergraduates: 1,745
- Postgraduates: 614
- Doctoral students: 445
- Location: Sagar, Madhya Pradesh, India
- Campus: Rural–urban fringe
- Website: www.dhsgsu.edu.in

Dr. Hari Singh Gour University (DHGV), formerly University of Saugar and more popularly known as Sagar University or University of Saugar, is a central university in the city of Sagar, the state of Madhya Pradesh or (MP), India. It is one of the oldest universities in Madhya Pradesh.The university offers multidisciplinary academic programs at undergraduate, postgraduate and doctoral levels through its 11 schools. Undergraduate and postgraduate admission in university is granted via national-level entrance examination conducted by National Testing Agency (NTA) annually.

== Inception and history ==
The university was first founded on 18 July 1946 during the British Raj, and it was originally named University of Saugar, Saugor. In February 1983 the name was changed to that of Sir Hari Singh Gour, the DHGV University's founder, by the State Government. On 15 January 2009 it was declared as a central university.

== Campus ==
The main campus of the DHGV is in Sagar City on Patharia hills, sprawling over 28,000 acres of land, and the DHGV also has several affiliated colleges and a distance education wing. A medical college is being built to train students in medical science.

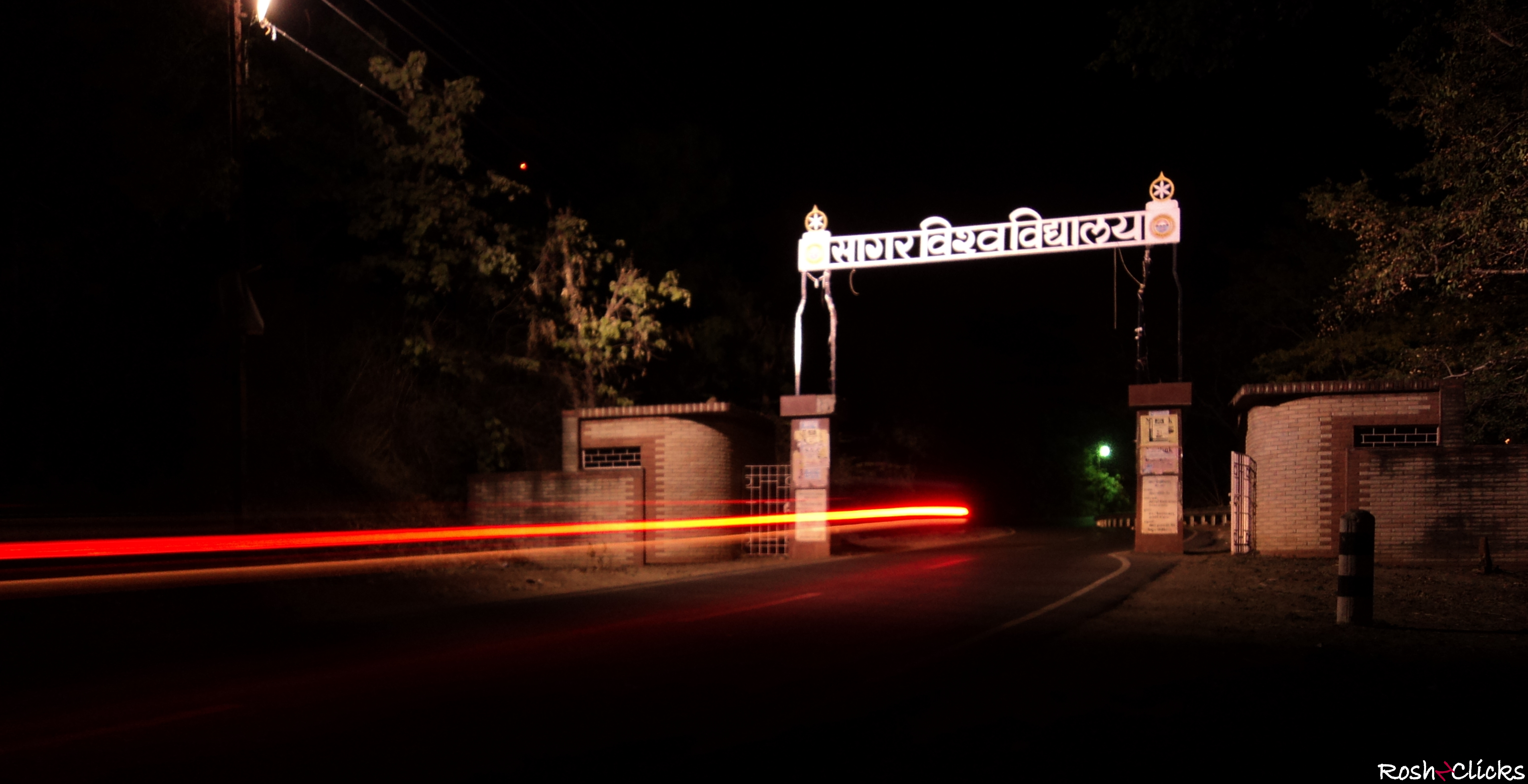
Entrance to Sagar University

There are separate hostels within the campus for boys and girls pursuing various programmes up to doctoral level. Also, a stadium, gymnasiums, a sports complex, playgrounds and an open-air theatre are also available.

== Departments ==
The DHGV offers courses at all levels such as bachelor's, masters, doctorate, diploma, and certificate. It also offers distance education programmes. The DHGV has several departments that offer specialised courses in the following fields and disciplines:

- Adult & Continuing Education
- Ancient Indian History, Culture and Archaeology
- Anthropology
- Applied Geology
- Applied Microbiology
- Bio-Technology
- Botany
- Business Management
- Central Instrumentation Centre
- Chemistry
- Commerce
- Communication & Journalism
- Computer Science & Application
- Criminology & Forensic Science
- Disaster Management
- Ecological & Environmental Sciences
- Economics
- DHGV School of Education
- English and European Languages
- Finance Officer
- Fine Arts and Performing Arts
- General & Applied Geography
- Hindi
- History
- Industrial & Pharmaceutical Chemistry
- Institute of Distance Education
- DHGV School of Law (DHGVSOL)
- Library and Information Sciences
- Linguistics
- Material Sciences
- Mathematics & Statistics
- Music
- Pharmaceutical Sciences
- Philosophy
- Physical Education
- Physics
- Political Science and Public Administration
- Psychology
- Sanskrit
- Sociology and Social Work
- Yogic Science
- Zoology

== DHGV Library and centers ==
- DHGV Computer Center
- DHGV Health Center
- DHGV Jawaharlal Nehru Central Library
- DHGV Press
- DHGV Abdul Khan Gani Stadium
- DHGV Science & Instrumentation Center
- DHGV Information & Communication Technology Center
- DHGV Works Department

== Controversies ==
The university has been rocked by several corruption cases and scandals ever since its elevation as a central university. In 2015 the university's first vice chancellor, Prof. N. S. Gajbhiye, was arrested by CBI and convicted of massive recruitment frauds. The HRD Ministry led by Smriti Irani was accused of influencing CBI investigation to protect the culprits. In August 2018 Madhya Pradesh High Court in its judgment stated that the university was fraudulently recruiting ineligible candidates while removing eligible candidates. In 2023 the university's registrar, Dr. Ranjan Kumar Pradhan, was removed from the post after he complained against financial irregularities by the new vice chancellor, Prof. Neelima Gupta, but Madhya Pradesh High Court declared his removal as illegal and ordered his reinstatement. In 2024 two professors of the university fought for the same office, resulting in the HOD running his office on roadside. In June 2025, the university students federation demanded immediate resignation of VC Neelima Gupta accusing her of frauds and malpractices.

== Notable alumni ==
- Rajneesh - spiritual guru
- Govind Namdev - theatre and Bollywood actor
- Yanamala Rama Krishnudu - former speaker of AP assembly
- Ashutosh Rana – Bollywood actor
- Mukesh Tiwari - Bollywood actor
- Satish Chandra Sharma - judge of Supreme Court of India
- Uday Prakash - story writer
- Virendra Kumar Khatik :- Social Justice minister and member of parliament
- Faggan Singh Kulaste :- M.P
- Gopal Bhargava :- 9 time mla and Former Cabinet minister
- Bhupendra Singh :- Former Cabinet Home minister, Madhya Pradesh
- Laxmi Narayan Yadav :- Ex M.P
- Govind Singh Rajpoot :- Cabinet minister, Govt of M.P.
- Harsh Yadav :-Former cabinet Minister
- D. D. Bhawalkar:-Scientist
- Muni Kshamasagar – A Jain Monk
- Mahendra Mewati - actor
- K S Sudarshan - former RSS Chief
- Ramkumar Verma - poet and writer
- Dinesh Paliwal - Indian National Congress Leader
- Siddharth Pandey - Vice president and HOD of R&D (Datt Mediproducts)
