= Barodiya Kalan =

Town in India

Coordinates: 24°12′50″N 78°34′49″E

- Village
- Interactive map of Barodiya Kalan
- Country: India
- State: Madhya Pradesh
- District: Sagar

Government
  - Type: Gram Panchayat

Population (2011)
  - Total: 6,836
- Vehicle registration: MP 15

Barodiya Kalan is a village in Malthon Tehsil of Sagar district, Madhya Pradesh.

== Geography ==
Barodiya is located on northern part of district. 470441 is the pin code of Barodiya. Khurai and Sagar are the nearest cities.

== Demographics ==
According to the 2011 census of India, Barodiya Kalan has a population of 6,836, of which 3,647 are males while 3,189 are females. There are a total of 1,625 families residing in the village. The literacy rate of Barodiya Kalan was 76.48%.

== See also ==
- Malthon
- Khurai
