= Khurai, Madhya Pradesh Assembly constituency =

Constituency of the Madhya Pradesh legislative assembly in India

Coordinates: 24.04°N 78.33°E

Khurai
- Constituency No. 36 for the Madhya Pradesh Legislative Assembly
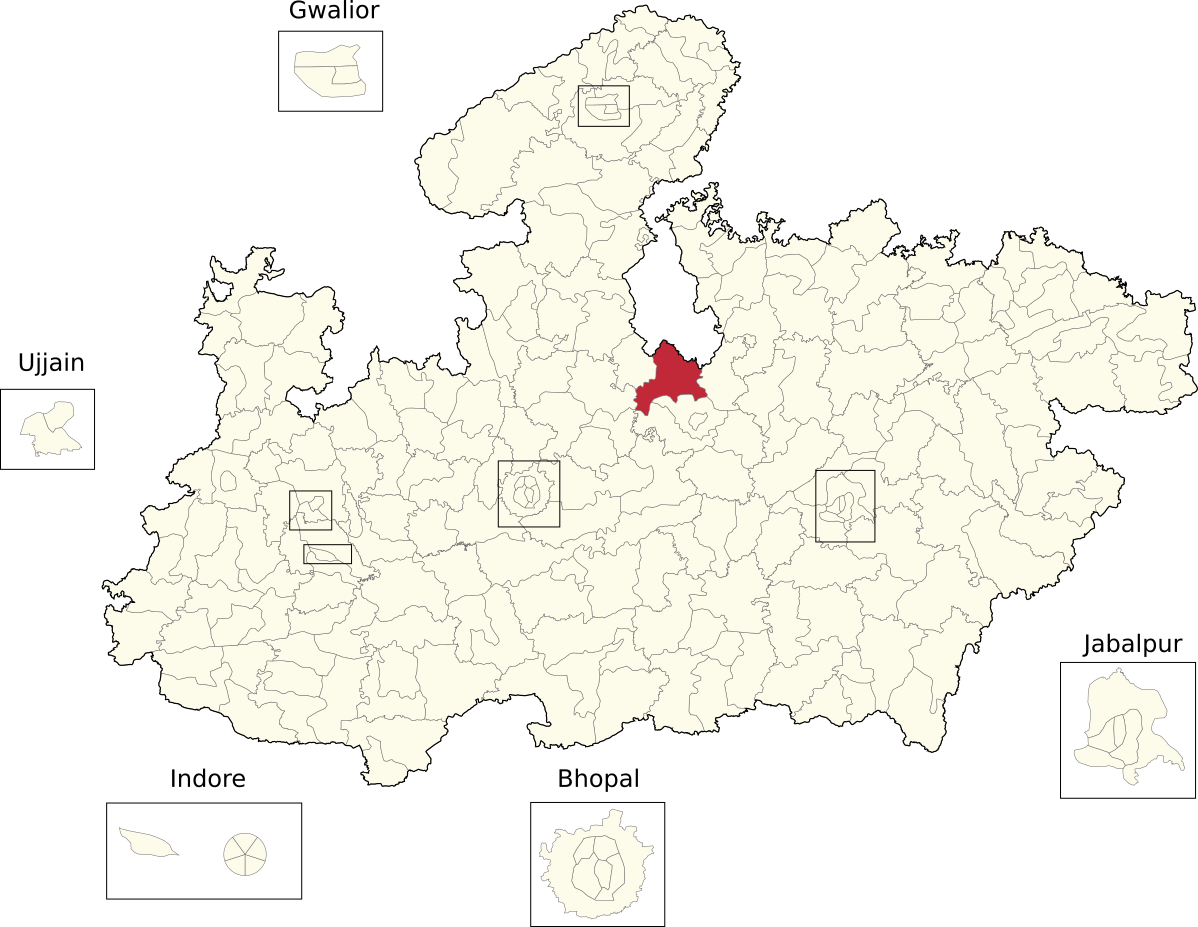

Constituency details
- Country: India
- Region: Central India
- State: Madhya Pradesh
- District: Sagar
- Lok Sabha constituency: Sagar
- Established: 1951
- Reservation: None

Member of Legislative Assembly
- 16th Madhya Pradesh Legislative Assembly
- Incumbent Bhupendra Singh
- Party: Bharatiya Janata Party

Khurai is one of the 230 Vidhan Sabha (Legislative Assembly) constituencies of Madhya Pradesh state in central India. This constituency came into existence in 1951, as one of the 184 Vidhan Sabha constituencies of Madhya Pradesh state. It was reserved for the candidates belonging to the Scheduled castes till 2008.

== Overview ==
Khurai (constituency number 36) is one of the 8 Vidhan Sabha constituencies located in Sagar district. This constituency presently covers the Khurai municipality and part of Khurai and malthone tehsil of the district.

Khurai is part of Sagar Lok Sabha constituency along with seven other Vidhan Sabha segments, namely, Bina, Surkhi, Naryoli and Sagar in this district and Kurwai, Sironj and Shamshabad in Vidisha district.

== Members of the Legislative Assembly ==
As a double member constituency:

- 1951: Gaya Prasad Mathura Prasad, Indian National Congress / Ramlal Balchand, Indian National Congress
- 1957: Bhadai Halke, Indian National Congress / Rishabh Kumar Mohanlal, Indian National Congress

As a single member constituency:

- 1962: Nand Lal Parmanand, Indian National Congress
- 1967: K. L. Choudhari, Bharatiya Jana Sangh
- 1972: Liladhar, Indian National Congress (I)
- 1977: Ram Prasad, Janata Party
- 1980: Harishankar Mangal Prasad Ahirwar, Indian National Congress (I)
- 1985: Malti Arvind Kumar, Indian National Congress (I)
- 1990: Dharmu Rai, Bharatiya Janata Party
- 1993: Dharmu Rai, Bharatiya Janata Party
- 1998: Dharmu Rai, Bharatiya Janata Party
- 2003: Dharmu Rai, Bharatiya Janata Party
- 2008: Arunodaya Choubey, Indian National Congress (I)
- 2013: Bhupendra Singh, Bharatiya Janata Party

Year	Member	Party
2018	Bhupendra Singh	Bharatiya Janata Party
2023	Bhupendra Singh	Bharatiya Janata Party

== Election results ==
=== 2023 ===
2023 Madhya Pradesh Legislative Assembly election: Khurai
Party	Candidate	Votes	%	±%
BJP	Bhupendra Singh	106,436	62.21	▲11.5
INC	Bahen Raksha Singh Rajput	59,111	34.55	▼6.24
BSP	Manoj Kumar Rajak	1,952	1.14	▼1.44
NOTA	None of the above	1,325	0.77	▲0.36
Majority		47,325	27.66	▲17.74
Turnout		171,098	80.03	▼1.59
BJP hold		Swing		

=== 2018 ===
2018 Madhya Pradesh Legislative Assembly election: Khurai
Party	Candidate	Votes	%	±%
BJP	Bhupendra Singh	78,156	50.71	
INC	Arunodaya Choubey (Annu Bhaiya)	62,861	40.79	
BSP	Badal Singh	3,981	2.58	
Independent	Dharmendra Banpuriya S/O Sundar Lal Banpuriya	1,502	0.97	
NOTA	None of the above	630	0.41	
Majority		15,295	9.92	
Turnout		154,120	81.62	
BJP gain from		Swing		

== See also ==
- Khurai
- Barodiya
- Bandri
