= Sagar Assembly constituency =

Sagar Assembly constituency may refer to

- Sagar, Karnataka Assembly constituency
- Sagar, Madhya Pradesh Assembly constituency
- Sagar, West Bengal Assembly constituency
