= Deshraj Patairiya =

Indian folk singer (1953–2020)

- Born: 25 July 1953; Tindni, near Nowgong town of Chhatarpur
- Died: 5 September 2020 (aged 67); Madhya Pradesh, India
- Occupation: Folk singer
- Known for: Radheyshyam Ramayan, Ram Vivah, Pushp Vaatika

Deshraj Patairiya was an Indian folk singer from Bundelkhand. He is credited for popularizing Bundeli folk music across the country and internationally.

== Early life ==
Patairiya was born in Tindani in the Chhatarpur district in the Indian state of Madhya Pradesh, on 25 July 1953. After graduating from high school, he earned a diploma in music. He was posted in the health department and performed songs at evening parties.

== Career ==
In 1972 he was a stage performer and started singing for Chhatarpur Akashvani Kendra. During the 1980s, when cassettes of folk music arrived on the market, Patairiya became a folk singer.

== Death ==
Deshraj Patairiya died on September 5, 2020, at the age of 67. He reportedly died of a heart attack. He is credited with composing a record 10,000 folk songs across five decades.

== Discography ==
Year	Album/Single Track	Record label
1994	Moro Kaanto Nikaro Vol.1	T-Series (company)
1994	Radha Bitiya Vol-2	T-Series (company)
1995	Mela Khon Machal Gayi	T-Series (company)
1995	Radheshyam Ramayan(Shree Ram Janam)	T-Series (company)
1995	Mela Khon Machal Gayi	T-Series (company)
1996	Mose Vyah Karale Pyari	T-Series (company)
1996	Banaras Gendiya Na Ghalo Vivah Geet(Banna Geet)	T-Series (company)
1996	Lala Hardol Ka Janam	T-Series (company)
1996	Je Din Katat Nahin Kaate	T-Series (company)
1996	Moro Byaav Ave Na Bhao	T-Series (company)
1996	Lala Hardaul Ka Bhaat	T-Series (company)
1996	Daaru Pee Ke Aa Gaye Saiyan	T-Series (company)
1996	Main To Aesai Kunwaro Rao	T-Series (company)
1996	Banaras Gendiya Na Ghalo Vivah Geet(Banna Geet)	T-Series (company)
1996	Cheel Gaadi Se Dilli Ghumaiyo	T-Series (company)
1997	Radheyshyam Ramayan (Kekai Ka Kop) Vol-6	T-Series (company)
1997	Ram Vivah Vol-5	T-Series (company)
1997	Dhanush Yagya	T-Series (company)
