= Rajaram Jain =

Indian linguist (born 1929)

Professor Rajaram Jain
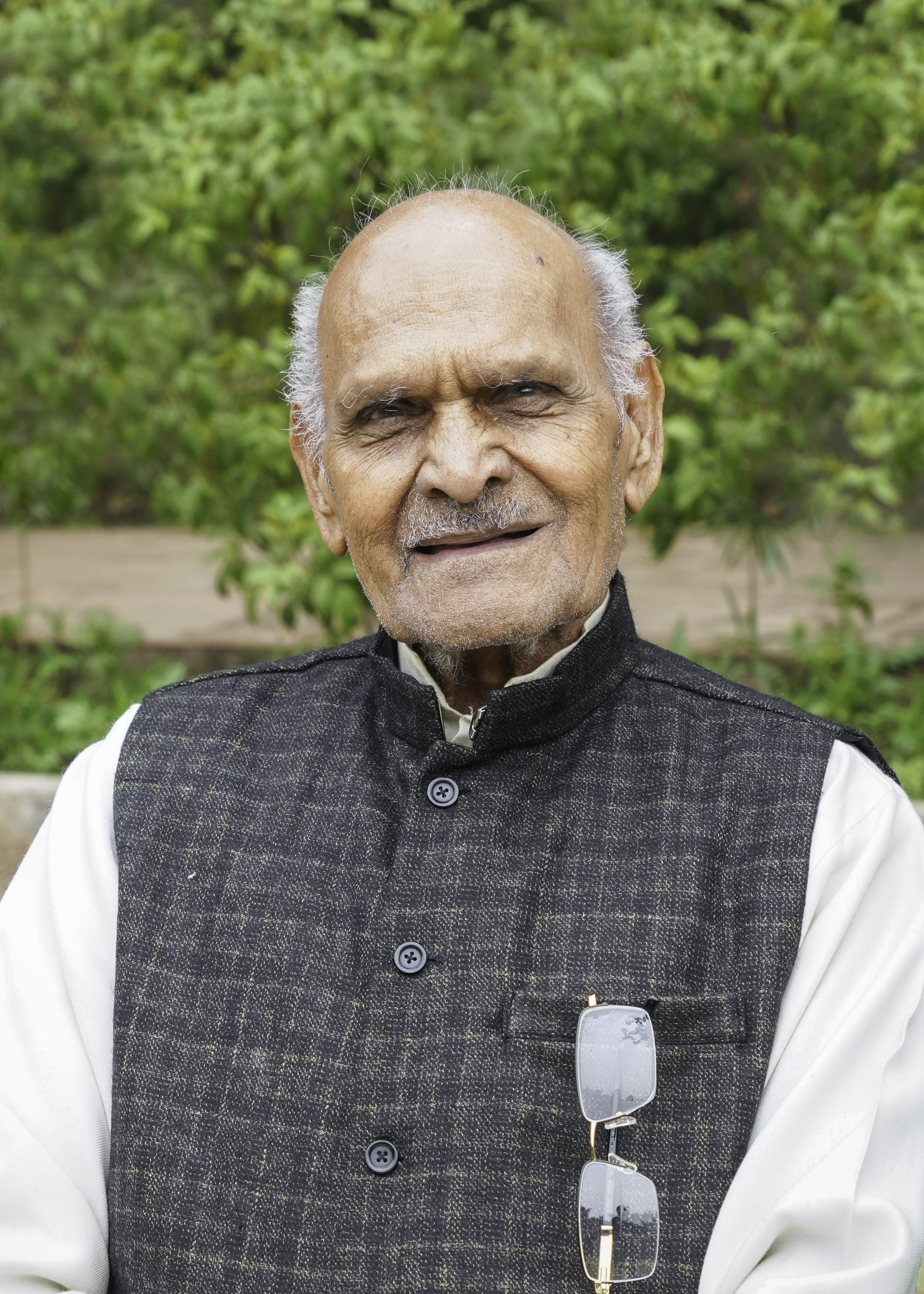
- Rajaram Jain in 2024
- Born: 1 February 1929 (age 97); Malthone, Central Provinces and Berar, British India
- Occupations: Author, Linguist and Scholar
- Spouse: Prof. Dr. Vidyawati Jain
- Children: 4
- Writing career
- Language: Prakrit, Apabramsha, Sanskrit, Hindi
- Notable awards: - Padma Shri (2024); - Presidential Award of Certificate of Honour (2000)

Rajaram Jain (born 1 February 1929) is an Indologist, philologist, author and a scholar of Prakrit, Apabhramsha, Sanskrit, Hindi and Shauraseni Prakrit languages. He is known for his critical studies and Hindi translations of rare, unpublished manuscripts, particularly the work of the 14th -15th century poet Raidhu. Jain's work has contributed to the understanding of Indo-Aryan literature. In 2024, the Government of India honoured Rajaram Jain with the Padma Shri, the fourth highest civilian honour.

== Early life ==
Rajaram Jain was born on February 1, 1929, in Malthon, Sagar district, Bundelkhand, Madhya Pradesh, India. Despite economic challenges and the early loss of his parents, he completed his education. He graduated from Banaras Hindu University in 1951, earned a Master's degree in Hindi literature in 1954, and later obtained an Acharya degree in Sanskrit.

== Personal life ==
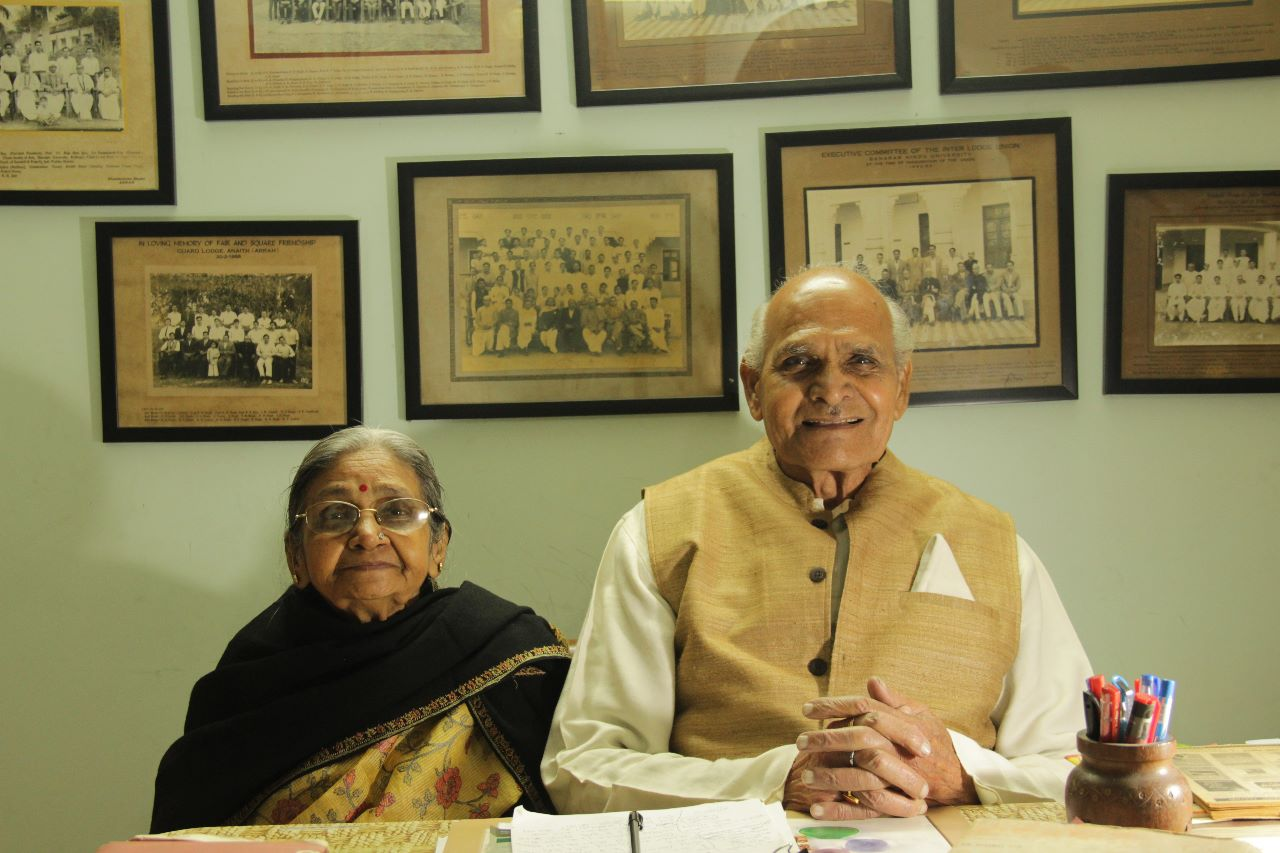
Rajaram Jain with his wife, Vidyawati Jain in 2018

In 1955, Rajaram Jain married Vidyawati Jain, who was 18 and had a 9th-grade education. Despite her traditional upbringing that limited women's education, she resumed her studies after marriage, eventually earning two M.A. degrees (Hindi and Prakrit with a Gold medal), a Ph.D., and a D.Litt. Rajaram Jain supported her academic and literary pursuits.

== Career ==
In 1961, he joined the Sanskrit and Prakrit Department at H.D. Jain College, Magadh University, Arrah, Bihar, and later served as Head of the Department. In 1967, he earned his Ph.D. with a critical study of 22 rare unpublished Apabhramsha epics by the poet Raidhu, titled "Raidhu Sahitya ka Alochanatmaka Parishilana" which gained academic recognition. As Hon. Director of D. K. Jain Oriental Research Institute Ara, Bihar (1979–2003), he carried out extensive research and edited/published the research magazine 'JAINA ANTIQUARY'. He also managed a collection of over 7,000 rare manuscripts from around the world.

In 1991, he became the Director of Shri Kundkund Bharati Prakrit Shodh Sansthan, New Delhi, where he edited and published the research magazine series PRAKRIT VIDYA'. He is currently an associate member of the Centre of Jaina Studies, University of London, and formerly served as the President of Shri Ganesh Varni Sansthan, Varanasi.he 1940s.

== Academic Recognition ==
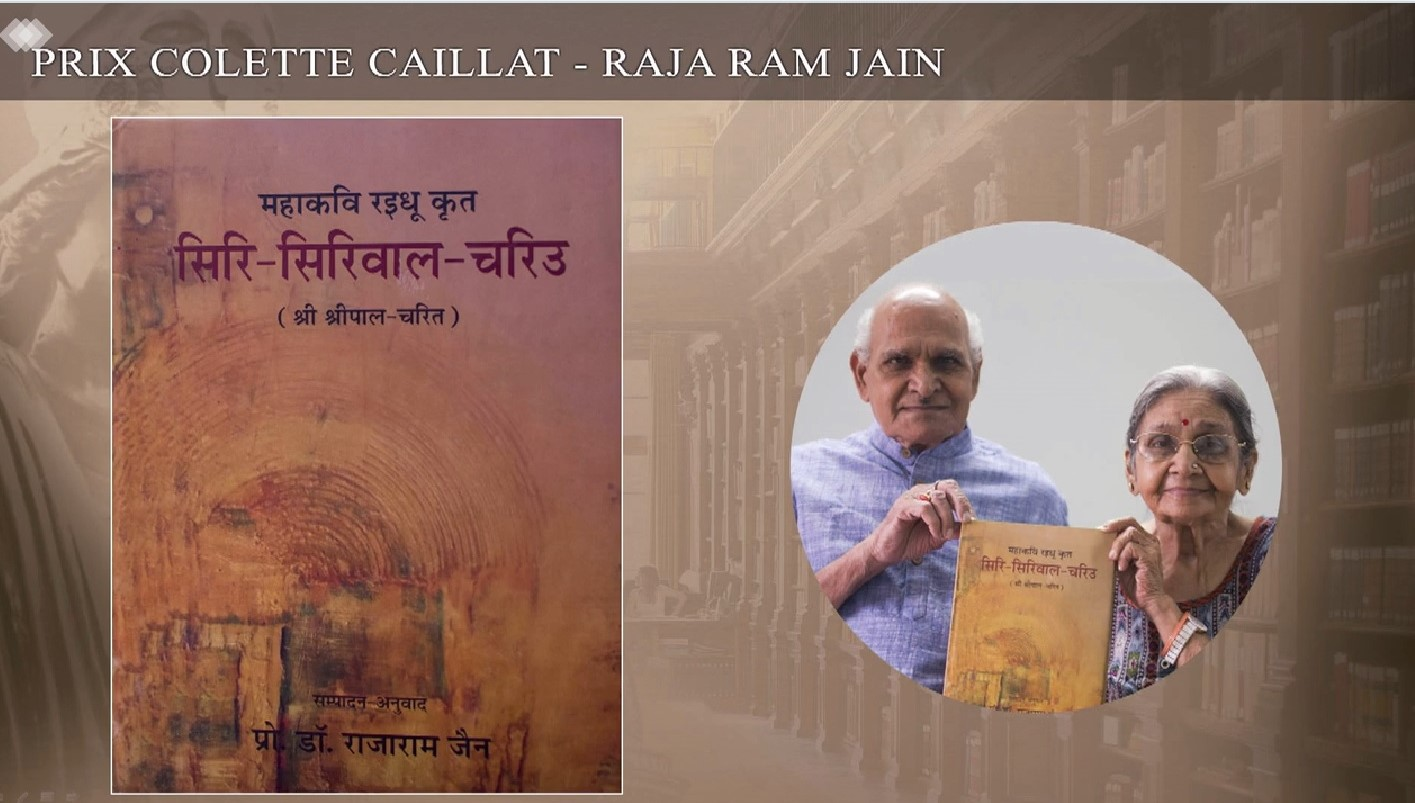
Rajaram Jain receiving The Institut de France's Prize for 'Sirival Cariu' in 2018

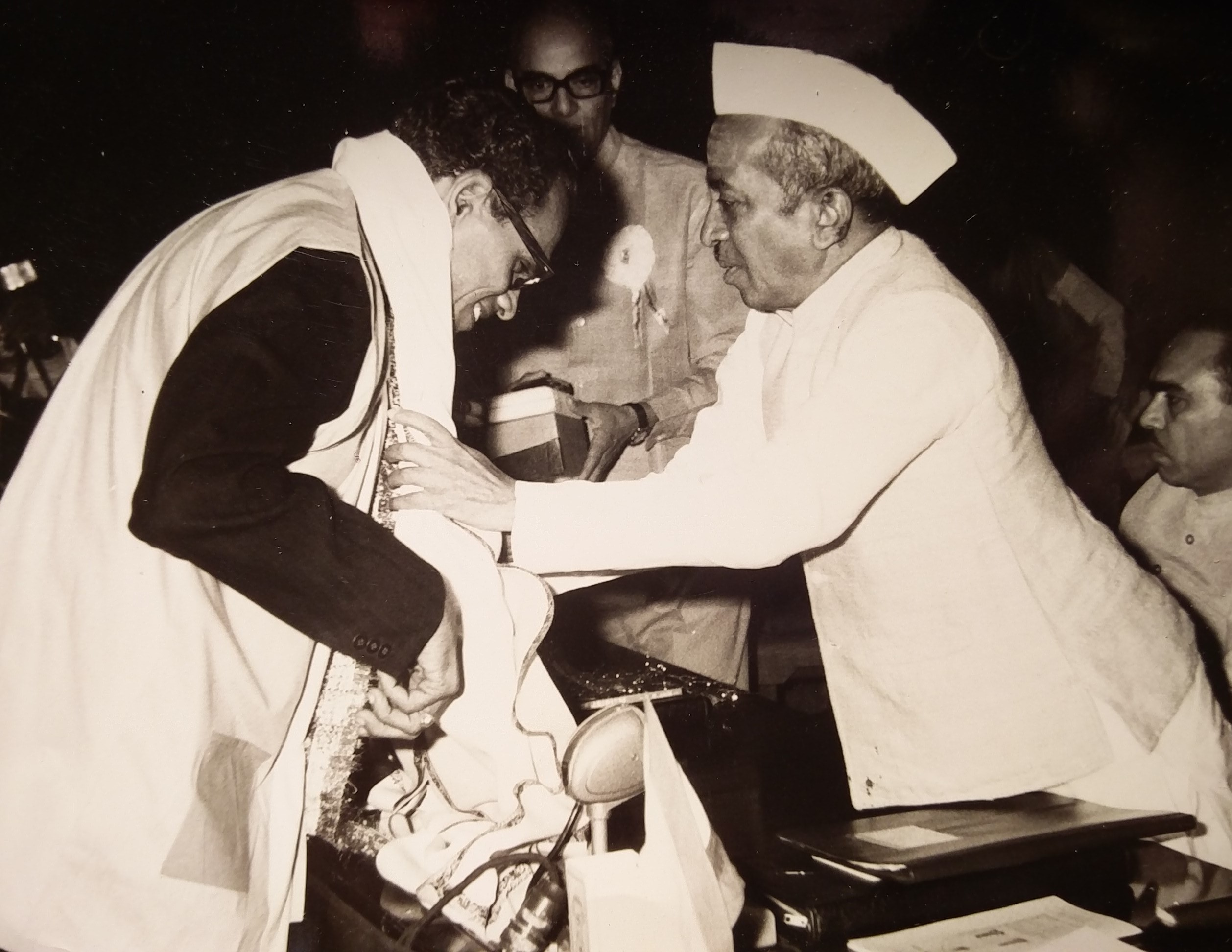
The Vice President, B. D. Jatti presenting 'Jain Itihas Ratna' to Rajaram Jain in 1974

In 2018, Rajaram Jain received the prestigious 'Colette Caillat Foundation Award' from the Institut de France, Paris, for his book 'Sirival Chariu', a critical edition and Hindi translation of the 15th-century Apabhramsha epic by poet Raidhu, highlighting India's trade relations with foreign countries. In 1974, he was honored with the 'Jain Itihas Ratna' award from the Vice-President of India B.D.Jatti for his book 'Vaddhamanacariu', a significant 12th-century literary and cultural masterpiece. Jain's scholarly pursuits include 'Jony Pahud', a rare deciphering of a 1st-Cen. Prakrit manuscript revealing medico-tantric insights. Additionally, his collaborative work Pasnaha Cariu delves into 12th-century manuscripts, providing the first reference to Delhi as Dhilli and detailing the reign of Tribhuvanpati Tomar, shedding light on Delhi's pre-Sultanate history with critical editions and Hindi translations enriched by exhaustive research and analysis.

== Awards, Honours and Recognitions ==
Rajaram Jain has been honored with awards for his contributions to literature, including:

=== Civilian honours ===
- 2024 - Padma Shri award from the Government of India in Literature & Education

=== National honours ===
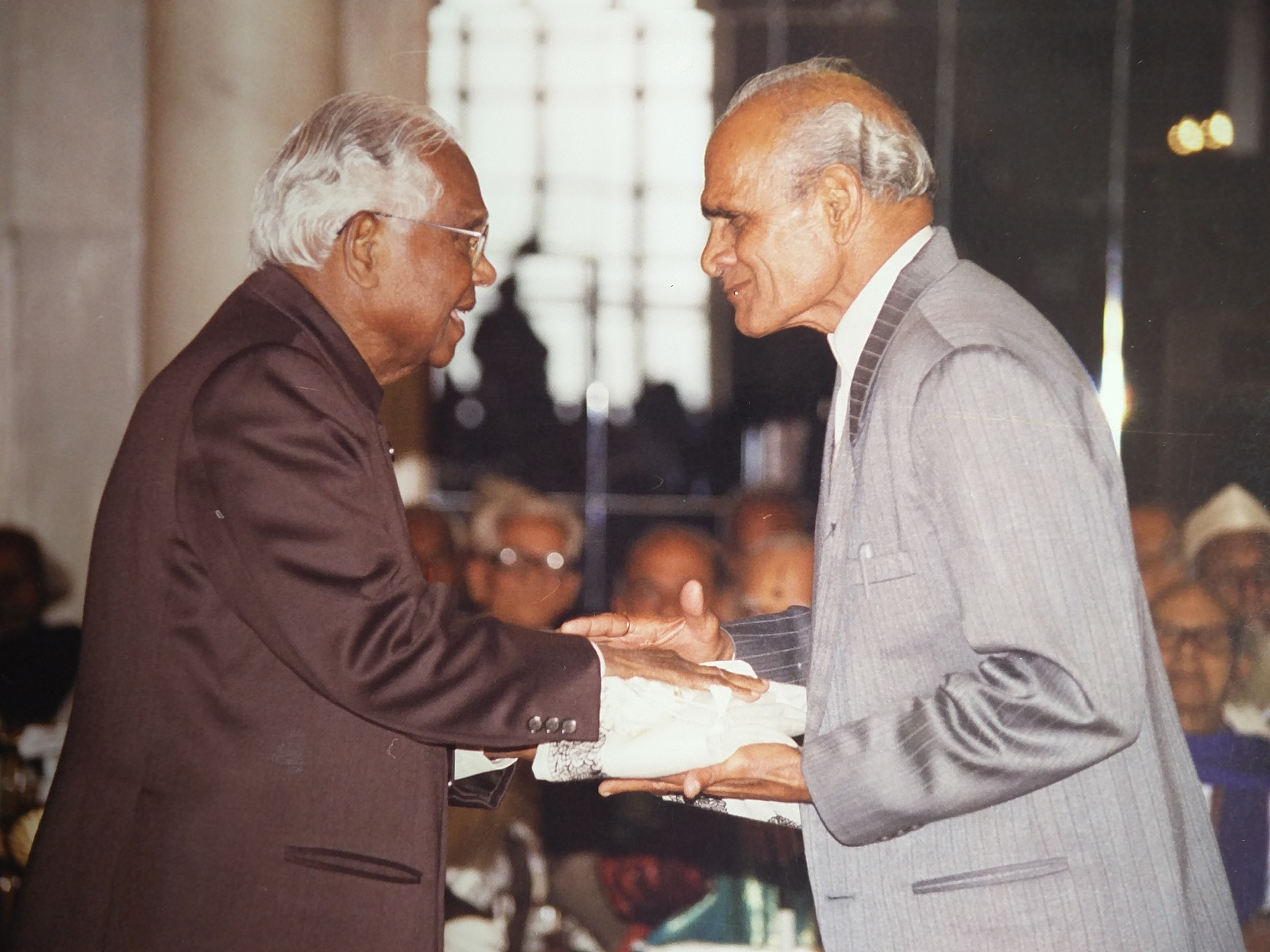
Rajaram Jain receiving 'Presidential Award of Certificate of Honour' from K. R. Narayanan, the President of India, in 2000

- 2000 - Presidential Award of Certificate of Honour from the Government of India
- 1974 - Jain Itihas Ratna by the Vice-President of India B.D.Jatti
- 2005 - D.Litt. (Honoris Causa) from Shri Lal Bahadur Shastri National Sanskrit University
- 2019 - Honored with a FESTSCHRIFT titled: 'Prakrit Purush'; a memoirs containing articles, essays (ISBN 81-86957-54-5)
- 2024 - 'Atal Sahitya Shikhar Samman'

=== International honours ===
- 2018 - Colette Caillat Foundation Award from Institut de France, Paris
- 2007 - Prakrit Jnanabharati International Award
- 1997 - Ahimsa International Award

== Publications ==
Rajaram Jain has authored 40 books and over 250 articles on various aspects of Ancient and medieval life. His works include critical editions, annotated translations and commentaries on rare, unpublished manuscripts:

=== Critical Edition and Translation of Poet Raidhu's work ===
A partial list of published works on Raidhu includes:

- Raidhu Sahitya ka Alochanatmaka-Parishilana (1974); 824 Pages; Prakrta Jaina Shashtra Aur Ahimsa Shodha Sansthan, Vaishali, Bihar
- Siddhantatthasaro (2021); Bharatiya Jnanpith, New Delhi; ISBN 978-93-90659-57-9
- Jimandhar Jin Chariu (2021); Bharatiya Jnanpith, New Delhi; ISBN 978-93-90659-56-2
- Appa-Samvohkavva (2021); Bharatiya Jnanpith, New Delhi; ISBN 978-93-86402-64-6
- Risahputta-Bharah-Bahubali-Chariu (2021): Published in 2020; Bharatiya Jnanpith, New Delhi; ISBN 978-93-87919-87-7
- Mehesar Chariu (2019); Bharatiya Jnanpith, New Delhi; ISBN 978-93-87919-23-5
- Sirival Chariu (2017); Bharatiya Jnanpith, New Delhi; ISBN 978-93-263-5592-6
- Riṭthaṇemi Chariu (2016); Meenakshi Prakashan, Meerut
- Siri Ram Chariu (2011); Research Institute of Prakrit, Jainology & Ahimsa in Vaishali, Bihar ISBN 978-93-81403-05-1
- Sanmati Charit (2010); Research Institute of Prakrit, Jainology & Ahimsa in Vaishali, Bihar; ISBN 978-81-904865-9-0
- Jambu-Sami Chariu (2008); Om Kothari Foundation, New Delhi
- Vittasaro (2006); Vidya Bhushan Charitable Trust, New Delhi
- Puṇyāsrava-kathā (2000); Śrī Digambara Jaina Sāhitya-Saṃskr̥ti Saṃrakshaṇa Samiti, Delhi
- Bhadrabāhu-Cāṇakya-Candragupta-kathānaka evaṃ Rājā Kalki-varṇana (1982); Sri Ganesha Varni Di. Jaina Samsthana, Varanasi
- Raidhu Granthavali Vol1(1975) Sholapur Jaina Samskrti Samraksaka Samgha - Pasnah Chariu - Sukosala Chariu - Dhannakumar Chariu
- Raidhu Granthavali Vol 2 (1988); Sholapur Jaina Samskrti Samraksaka Samgha - Sammai-Jina-chariu

=== Other Works ===
- Jony-Pahuda (2018); Bharatiya Jnanpith, New Delhi; ISBN 978-93-87919-23-5
- Pasanaha Chariu (2006); Bharatiya Jnanpith, New Delhi; ISBN 978-81-263-1200-9
- Vaddhmanchariu (1975); Bharatiya Jnanpith, New Delhi
- Prākr̥ta-bhāshā evaṃ śramaṇa-saṃskr̥ti kī vyāpakatā (2019); Prakrit Bharti Academy, Jaipur
- Bhavishya Datta Kavya (2015); Sri Bharatavarsiya Digambara Jaina Mahasabha, New Delhi
- Jain Literature -The Incredible Treasure of Ancient Knowledge and Science (2015); Prachya Shraman Bharti, Muzaffarnagar (U.P.)
- Contribution of Prakrit & Jain Literature to Indian Orientology– An Overview (2010); Jain Anushilana Kendra, Jaipur, Rajasthan
- Shauseni Prakrit Bhasha Evum Uske Sahitya ka sankshipta Itihaas (2010); Jain Anushilana Kendra, Jaipur, Rajasthan
- Jaina Manuscripts and Inscriptions-An Overview (2007); Sri Ganesha Varni Di. Jaina Samsthana, Varanasi; ISBN 978-81-86957-48-6
- Ahimsa Evam Paryaavaran Sanrakshan Siddhaanton Ka Akshay Shrot (2007); Mr. Mohanlal Chandravati Jain Charitable Trust, Delhi
- Mahameru Acharya Kundakunda, an East Indian Knowledge-Science (Kannada) (2006); NIPSAR, Mysore, Karnataka
- Shaurseni Prakrit & its Literature (2002); Govt. of India Registration No. 48869/89
- Prachya Bhartiya Gyan-Vigyan ke Mahameru Acharya Kundkund (1989); Prachyabharati Prakashan, Ara, Bihar
- Hindi Ke Prasiddha Lokkavi (1988); Dilli Siksha Bharati
- Contribution of Jaina Literature to the Development of Indian Culture Vol. 1 (1982); Krishna Nagar Jaina Samaj, Delhi. Author: Nemichand Shastri, Ed: Rajaram Jain, Devendra Kr. Shastri
- Contribution of Jaina Literature to the Development of Indian Culture Vol. 2 (1982); Krishna Nagar Jaina Samaj, Delhi. Author: Nemichand Shastri, Ed: Rajaram Jain, Devendra Kr. Shastri
- Shraman-sahitya men varnit Bihar ki kuchh jain tirthabhumiyan (1975); Bhagavan Mahavir, Gaya, Bihar
