= Bundelkhand Medical College =

Medical college in Madhya Pradesh, India

Coordinates: 23.819°N 78.755°E

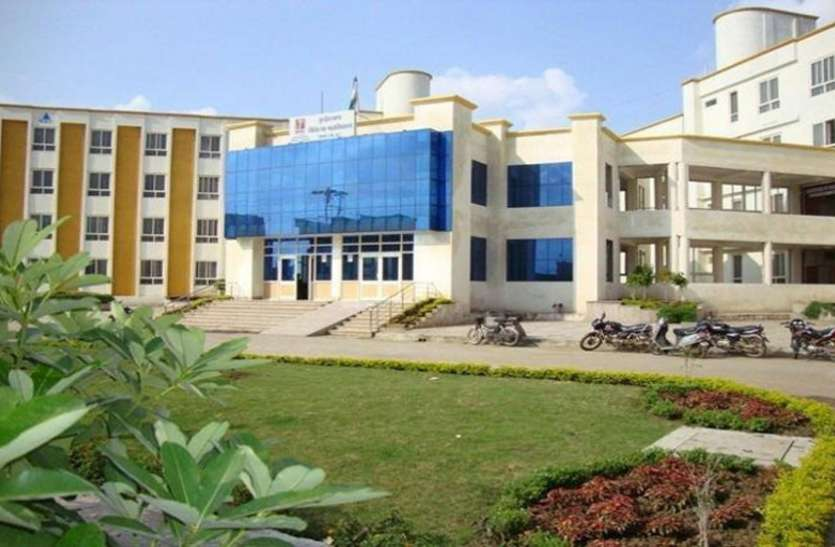
- Motto: Tamaso mā jyotirgamaya
- Motto in English: Lead us from darkness to light
- Type: Medical College and Hospital
- Established: 2007; 19 years ago
- Affiliations: Madhya Pradesh Medical Science University
- Dean: Dr. R. S. Verma
- Students: 150 per year (undergraduate)
- Location: Sagar, Madhya Pradesh, India
- Website: http://bmcsagar.edu.in/

Bundelkhand Medical College (BMC) is a tertiary government medical college in Sagar, Madhya Pradesh, India. S.C. Tiwari, acted as the first dean of this college. The first batch of M.B.B.S was admitted in 2009. This institute is currently being developed as a centre for improving the medical teaching activity as well as higher quality health facilities for the people of Bundelkhand region.

The college imparts the degree of Bachelor of Medicine and Surgery (MBBS). Nursing and para-medical courses are also offered. Post-graduation courses (MD/MS) are offered in 11 subjects currently. The college is affiliated to Madhya Pradesh Medical Science University (from 2014 onwards) and is recognized by National Medical Commission. Until 2013, it was affiliated to Hari Singh Gour University, Sagar. The selection to the college is done on the basis of merit through National Eligibility and Entrance Test.

== Courses ==
The college offers following courses recognized by Medical Council of India:

- MBBS
- MS/MD courses in various subjects
- B.Sc. Nursing
- Paramedical courses

== Establishment ==
In November 2007 Govt. of M.P. decided to start a new medical college for the people of Bundelkhand. Honorable Chief Minister of M.P. Shri Shivraj Singh Chauhan and honorable Minister of Medical education Gori Shanker Shejwar decided to start this project. Principal secretary and Director of Medical Education Department were called to search for an officer for this dream project. In Feb 2008, S.C. Tiwari accepted this difficult task and got appointed as a nodal officer and acting Dean for this new project.

First office of Sagar Medical College was started at Satpura Bhavan Bhopal under the supervision of V.K. Saini (DME MP Govt.) and Saraswat (Project Director) another small office was started at Sagar inside the District hospital which was handled by Yadav (A.O.). Later on the staff was increased. The first working team consisted of Bhavna Bhimte, Gaurav Sharma, Ravi Pachori, Mahendra Kumar Bharti, Y. Pawade, Vishal, Mitesh Shah and Rajbhan, Amit Jain, Kusum Patidar and A.K. Mathur. This team worked from a single room at Satpuda Bhavan Bhopal. Another team of doctors was working at Sagar. This team consisted of R. Pandey, Sarvesh Jain, Deepak Shrivastava, Shikha, Amar Gagwani, Anil, Dushyant, Pinkesh, Malti, Anand and Anju Jha.

In May 2009 the officers team was shifted from Bhopal to Sagar and started working for the development of college. Above team members gave their support for the progress of this college. Later on Professor V. M. Agnihotri, Professor Mukul Yadav, Professor R.S. Verma, Annapurna Bose, S.S. Mishra gave their support for the development of college.

S.C. Tiwari, V. M. Agnihotri and M.K. Bharti gave their best support for entire development of this institute. Due to all combined efforts Sagar Medical College came in to existence and got permission by MCI in October 2009. At the time of L.O.P. this was the only recognized Govt. medical college in Madhya Pradesh. On 5 Nov 2009 honorable Chief Minister Shri Shivraj Singh Chauhan inaugurated this college for the first academic session. This was the only project which almost completed in 2 year short duration. District hospital Sagar was the first associated hospital for this college.

== Departments ==
- Anatomy
- Physiology
- Biochemistry
- Pharmacology
- Pathology
- Microbiology
- Forensic Medicine
- Community Medicine
- Ophthalmology
- Otorhinolaryngology
- Medicine
- Surgery
- Obstetrics & Gynecology
- Pediatrics
- Anesthesiology
- Radiology
- Dermatology
- Orthopedics
- Psychiatry

== Campus ==
The campus is spread over a large area consisting of college building, medical auditorium, and associated hospital, UG hostels, nurses hostel and doctor's residential colony. The UG hostel for boys and girls are situated within the campus. The college campus also has a badminton court, games hall and ground for various sports and recreational activities.

College building: has three floors. Ground floor has Administrative block including Dean office and Departments of Anatomy and Biochemistry. First floor has departments of Physiology and Community Medicine (P.S.M.). Pathology and Forensic Medicine departments are Located on Second floor including fully air conditioned Examination hall. Departments of Pharmacology and Microbiology are located on top floor. The college has a working lift facility. All departments have their own museums and modern amenities required for teaching, training and patients support. The college building is connected to the Central Library & L.T. complex.

A Central Library, Lecture Theatres and GYM complex: with 4 lecture halls, a central library, reading room for students and staff, an air conditioned Gymnasium, central opened area, Boys & Girls common room (having table tennis, carrom). Besides the LT complex there is mortuary, P.M. room & animal house which is according to MCI norms

Hospital: Hospital is a 750 bedded, tertiary care teaching hospital having 3 floors. All the Clinical departments are present along with supportive departments, central lab etc. with a canteen, 24 hour casualty services are available.

== Accommodation ==
There are 5 hostels. Each for girls, boys, nursing students, separate female & male junior resident hostels. Mess facility is currently available in boys & girls hostel. Separate bungalow for dean and superintendent. Apartment style accommodation for professors, associate professors, assistant professors, and demonstrators. There is separate accommodation for class three and class four employees nearby.

A guest house with 12 rooms is present for faculty and student's parents.
