= Sagar, Madhya Pradesh =

City in Madhya Pradesh, India

Sagar Heart of Undivided India
- City
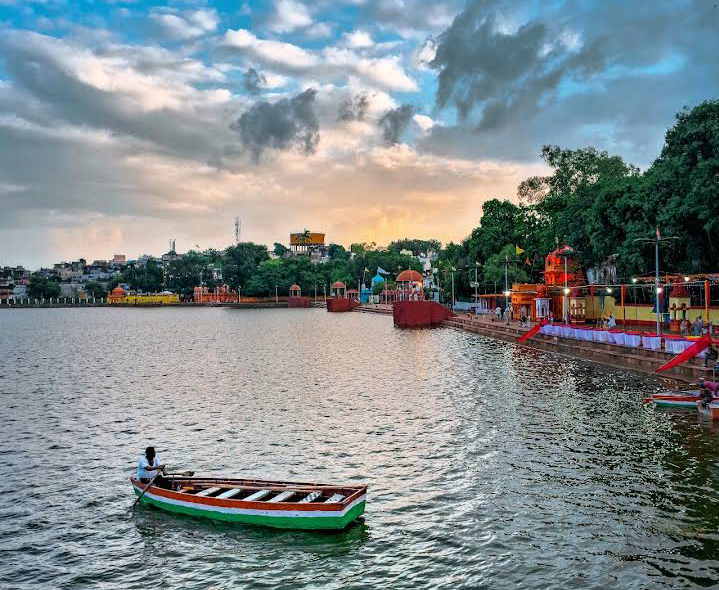
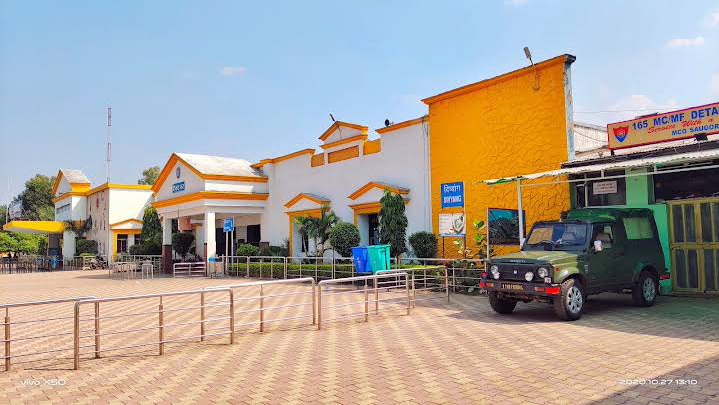
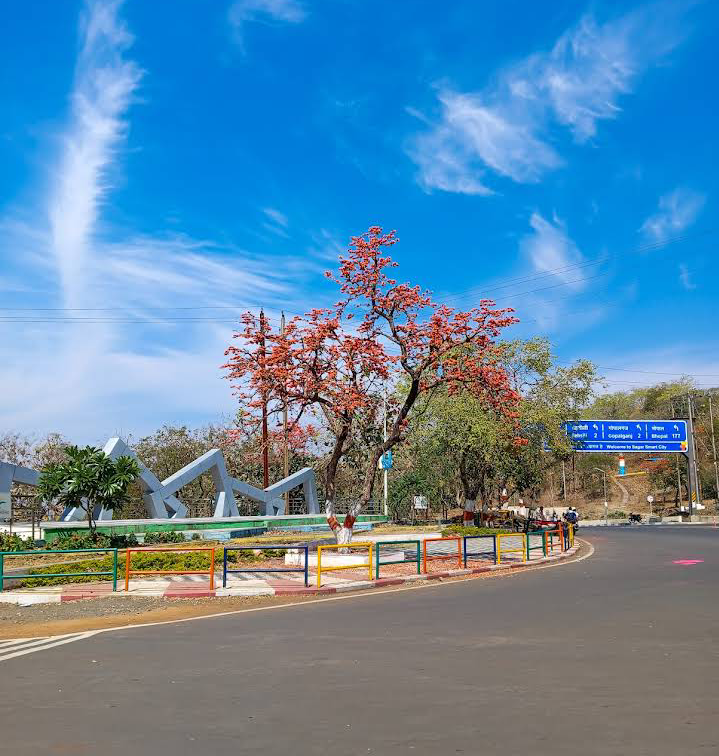
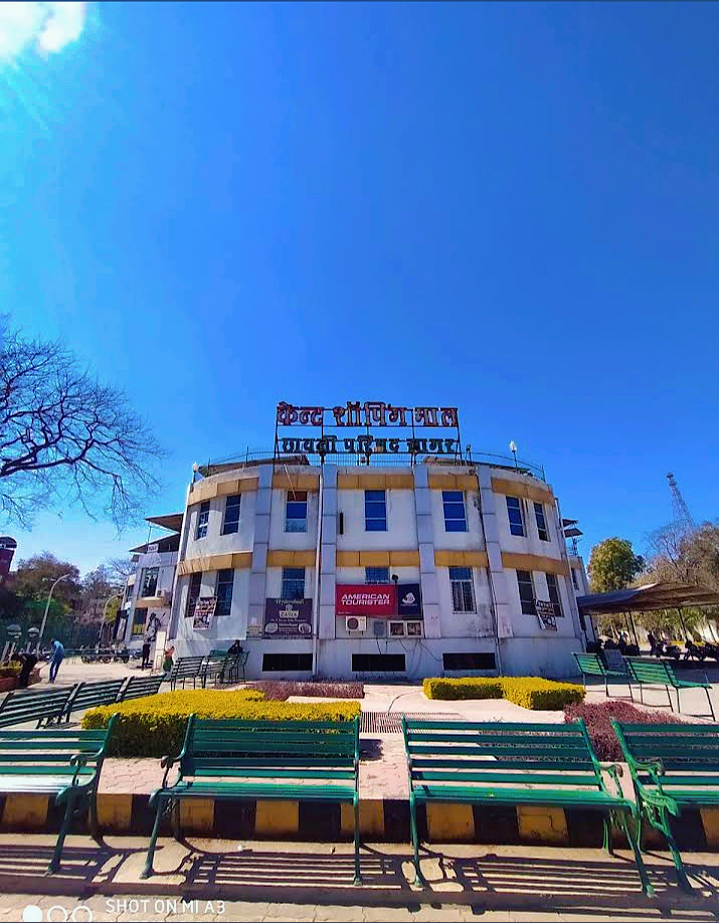
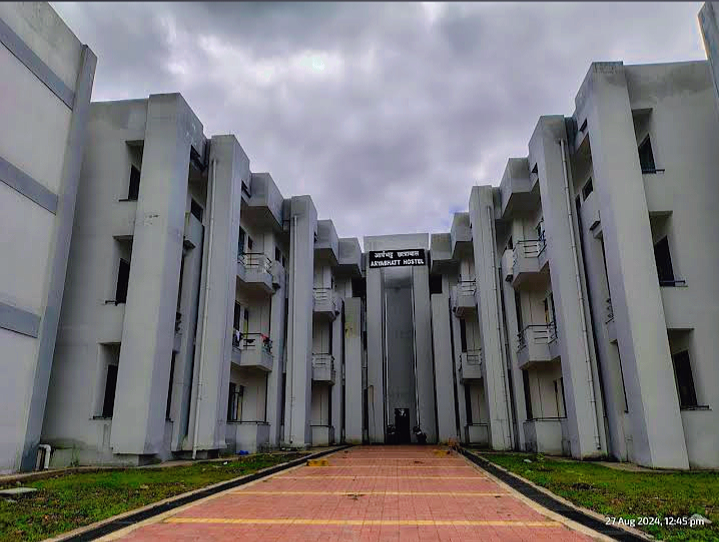
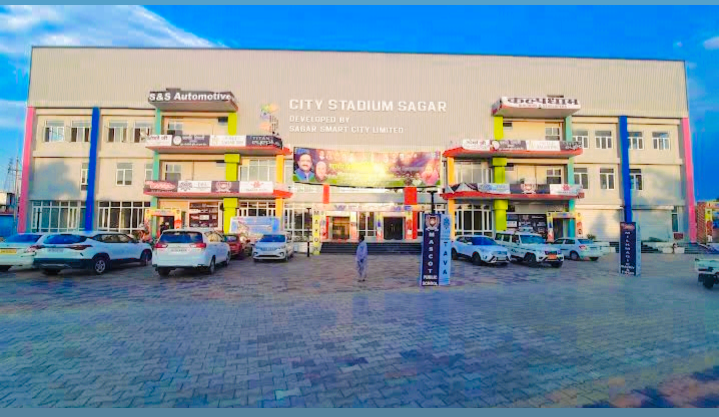
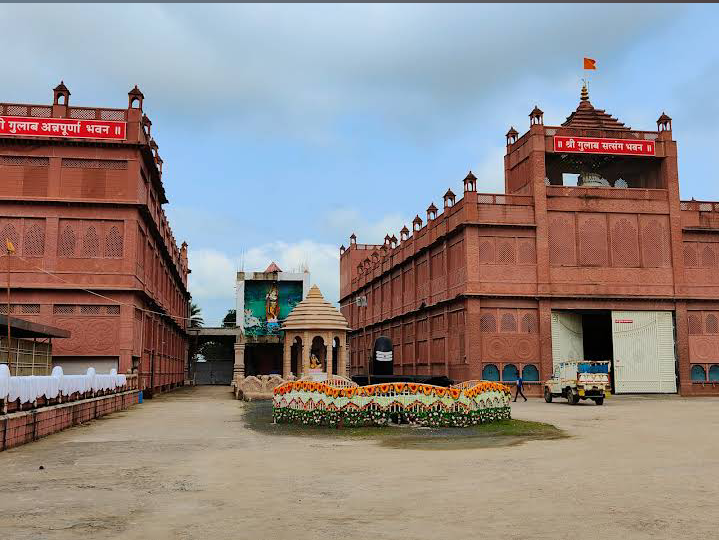
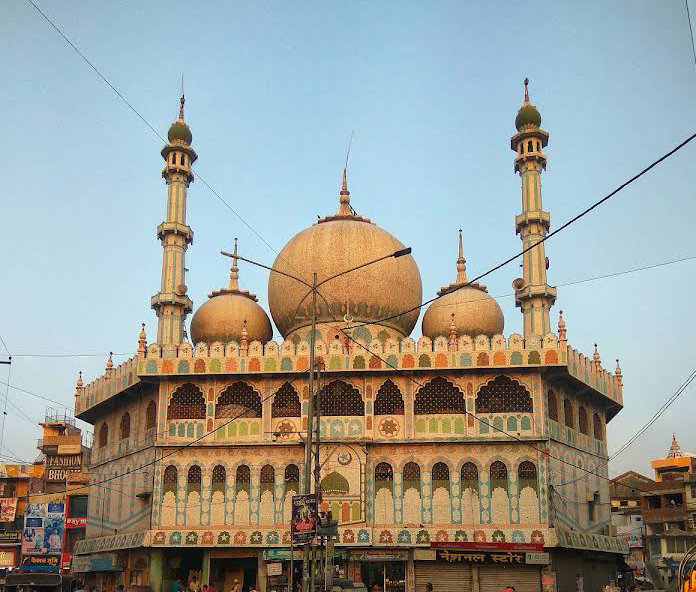
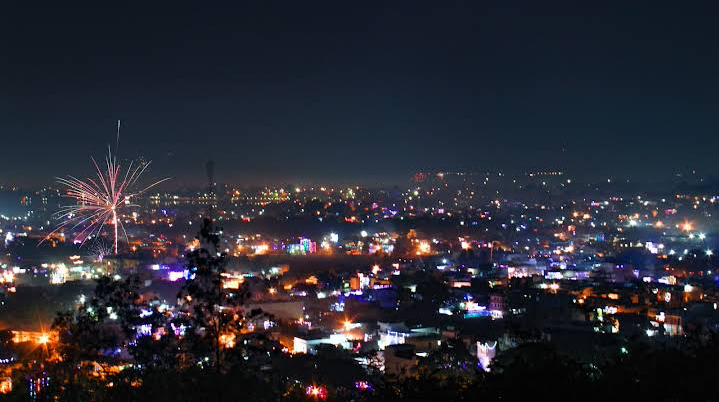
- City View from Lakha Banjara Lake Sagar Railway Station University Road Cantt Mall Sagar University Sagar Smart City Stadium Jain Mandir Jama Masjid Night View of Sagar
- Nickname: Switzerland of Madhya Pradesh
- Location within Madhya Pradesh Location within India
- Coordinates: 23°50′18.618″N 78°44′22.92″E
- Country: India
- State: Madhya Pradesh
- District: Sagar
- Ward: 51 Wards

Government
  - Type: Mayor–Council
  - Body: Sagar Municipal Corporation
  - Mayor: Sangeeta Sushil Tiwari

Area
  - Metro: 49.763 km^{2} (19.214 sq mi)
- Elevation: 427 m (1,401 ft)

Population (2011)
  - City: 274,556
  - Rank: 6th rank in Madhya Pradesh; 2nd rank in Bundelkhand
  - Density: 232/km^{2} (600/sq mi)
  - Metro: 370,208
- Demonyms: Sagariya, Sagarwasi

Language
  - Official: Hindi
- Time zone: UTC+5:30 (IST)
- PIN: 470001,2,3,4
- Telephone code: 07582
- Vehicle registration: MP-15
- Website: sagar.nic.in www.sagarmunicipalcorporation.com

Sagar, formerly Saugor, is a city, municipal corporation and administrative headquarter in Sagar district of the state of Madhya Pradesh in central India. It's Madhya Pradesh's 6th largest city of by population. The city is situated on a spur of the Vindhya Range, 1,758 feet (536 m) above sea-level around 182 kilometres (113 mi) northeast of the state capital, Bhopal.

Besides being the administrative headquarters of Sagar district and Sagar division, Sagar has many administrative offices of the Sagar division situated in the city. Sagar's metropolitan area includes Sagar Municipal Corporation, Sagar Cantonment, Makronia, Rajakhedi and Gambhiria.

Sagar has been selected as one of the hundred Indian cities to be developed as a smart city under Prime Minister Narendra Modi's flagship Smart Cities Mission.

The first and oldest University of Madhya Pradesh is situated in Sagar city. It was established in 18 July 1946 by Sir Harisingh Gaur, in 15 January 2008 it got the status of Central University.

Sagar is also very famous for the Mahar Regiment of the Army, the headquarters of this regiment is located here. Jawaharlal Nehru Police Academy is also located here.

== History ==
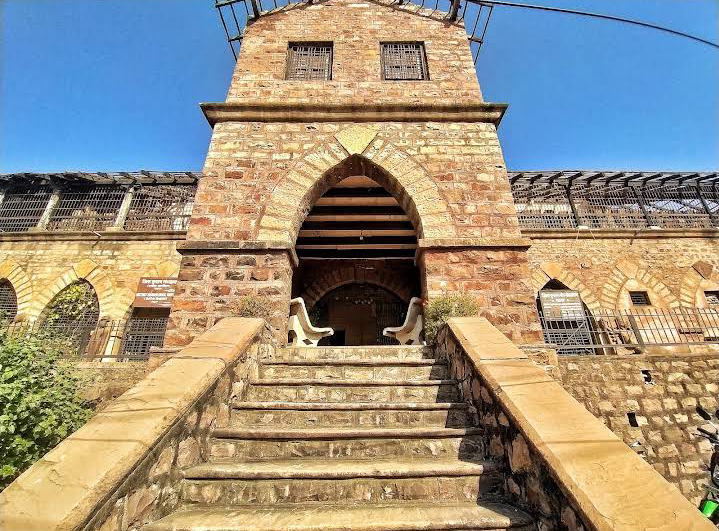
Sagar City Museum

The ancient Indian kingdom of Chedi had its capital at Suktimati, which was located at Sagar during contemporary times. The history of Sagar District before 1022 A.D. is generally unknown; after that, records are available. Sagar was under the rule of Ahir Rajas and their capital was at Garhpehra. In 1660, Udenshah founded the present town of Sagar.

After 1735, the city came under the rule of the Peshwas. When Chhatrasal gave a region (Subah) to Bajirao, he appointed Govindpant Kher (later Bundele) as an administrator. Govindpant founded the city of Sagar next to the Sagar Lake and made the city his capital. In 1818, a large part of the Sagar district was ceded by Peshwa Baji Rao II to the British East India Company. Administratively, the position of Sagar and the neighbouring territories underwent frequent changes.

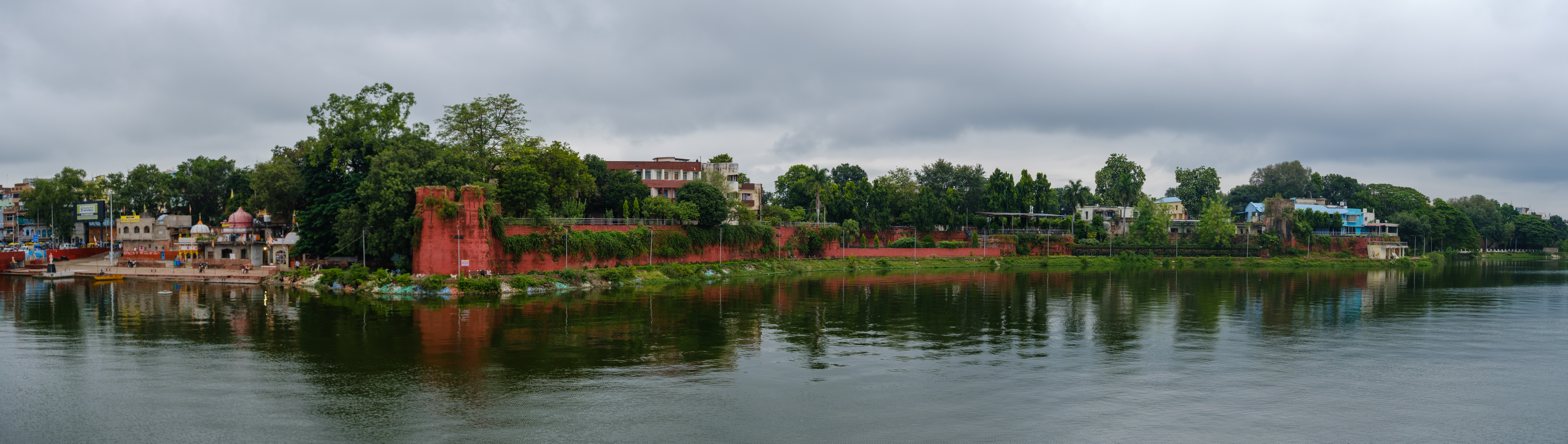
Panorama of Sagar Fort

The Saugor territory was first placed under the superintendent of Political Affairs of Bundelkhand. Later, in 1820, this area, called the 'Saugor and Nerbudda Territories,' was placed under the administration of an agent to the governor-general. The region fell under the North-Western Province, following its constitution in 1835. In 1842 occurred the Bundela rising, the quelling of which demanded more direct attention from the Governor-General. But the order was restored in the following year, and the Saugor and Nerbudda Territories were again placed under the political control of an Agent named to the Governor-General. The arrangement, however, was not found to be satisfactory, and these territories were once again restored to the North-Western Provinces in 1853. After that in 1861, the Saugor and Nerbudda territories and the Nagpur state formed a Commissioner's Province called Central Provinces.

== Geography ==
Sagar has an average elevation of 427 metres (1401 ft) and is located in the central part of India, just north of the upper limit of the Vindhya mountain ranges.here is a lake in middle of the city.

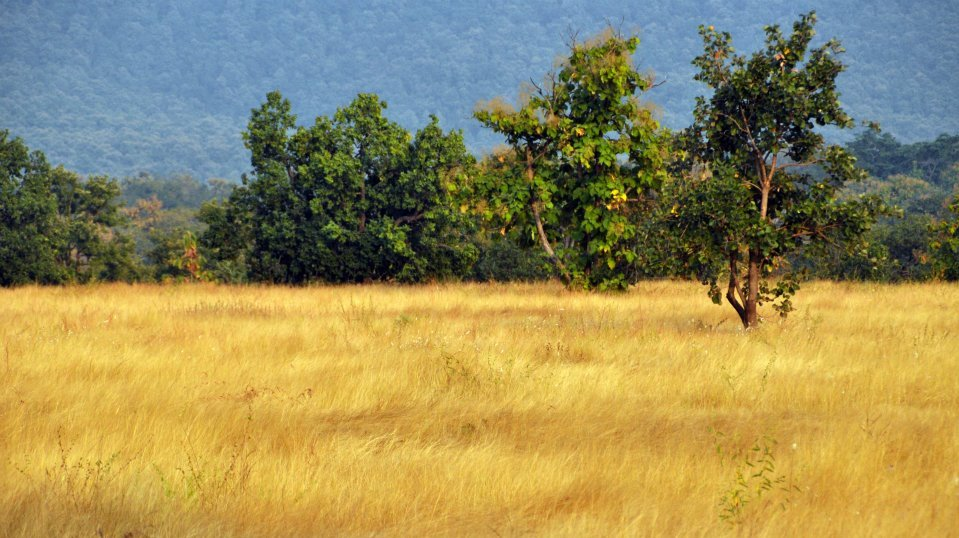

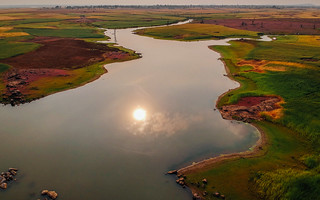
Fields in Sagar District

=== Climate ===
Sagar has humid subtropical climate (Köppen climate classification Cwa) with hot summers, a somewhat cooler monsoon season and cool winters. Very heavy rainfalls in the monsoon season from June to September.

Climate data for Sagar (1991–2020, extremes 1901–present)
Month	Jan	Feb	Mar	Apr	May	Jun	Jul	Aug	Sep	Oct	Nov	Dec	Year
Record high °C (°F)	33.3 (91.9)	37.3 (99.1)	42.5 (108.5)	44.4 (111.9)	46.7 (116.1)	47.0 (116.6)	41.4 (106.5)	37.6 (99.7)	39.7 (103.5)	39.9 (103.8)	37.7 (99.9)	33.6 (92.5)	47.0 (116.6)
Mean daily maximum °C (°F)	24.7 (76.5)	28.2 (82.8)	33.5 (92.3)	38.4 (101.1)	41.3 (106.3)	37.5 (99.5)	30.8 (87.4)	29.0 (84.2)	31.0 (87.8)	32.5 (90.5)	29.8 (85.6)	26.8 (80.2)	32.0 (89.6)
Daily mean °C (°F)	17.9 (64.2)	21.2 (70.2)	26.1 (79.0)	30.9 (87.6)	33.8 (92.8)	31.5 (88.7)	27.3 (81.1)	26.0 (78.8)	26.7 (80.1)	26.4 (79.5)	23.1 (73.6)	19.3 (66.7)	25.9 (78.5)
Mean daily minimum °C (°F)	11.2 (52.2)	14.1 (57.4)	18.8 (65.8)	23.4 (74.1)	26.3 (79.3)	25.5 (77.9)	23.8 (74.8)	22.9 (73.2)	22.3 (72.1)	20.1 (68.2)	16.4 (61.5)	12.7 (54.9)	19.8 (67.6)
Record low °C (°F)	1.7 (35.1)	1.1 (34.0)	7.2 (45.0)	10.6 (51.1)	16.3 (61.3)	13.1 (55.6)	14.5 (58.1)	14.8 (58.6)	16.7 (62.1)	11.3 (52.3)	6.1 (43.0)	2.1 (35.8)	1.1 (34.0)
Average rainfall mm (inches)	13.0 (0.51)	12.7 (0.50)	14.2 (0.56)	6.0 (0.24)	18.6 (0.73)	169.4 (6.67)	373.4 (14.70)	362.4 (14.27)	182.4 (7.18)	20.8 (0.82)	11.5 (0.45)	7.7 (0.30)	1,192.1 (46.93)
Average rainy days	1.0	1.2	1.1	0.7	1.8	7.7	15.2	15.0	8.8	1.6	0.9	0.5	55.4
Average relative humidity (%) (at 17:30 IST)	43	34	25	19	23	48	77	83	71	48	44	44	47
Source 1: India Meteorological Department
Source 2: Tokyo Climate Center (mean temperatures 1991–2020)

Sagar has been ranked 15th best "National Clean Air City" under (Category 2 3-10L Population cities) in India.

== Demographics ==
Religion in Sagar city (2011)
Religion	Percent
Hinduism	81.53%
Islam	10.16%
Jainism	7.28%
Christianity	0.63%
Other or not stated	0.40%

As per 2011 Indian Census, Sagar municipal corporation limit had a total population of 274,556, of which 143,425 were males and 131,131 were females. The population within the age group of 0 to 6 years was 32,610. The total number of literates in Sagar was 216,422, which constituted 78.8% of the population with male literacy of 82.6% and female literacy of 74.6%. The effective literacy rate of 7+ population of Sagar was 89.5%, of which male literacy rate was 93.7% and the female literacy rate was 84.8%. The Scheduled Castes and Scheduled Tribes population was 54,432 (19.83%) and 3,052 (1.11%) respectively. Sagar had 52833 households in 2011.

Languages of Sagar city (2011)
1. Hindi (48.2%)
2. Bundeli (46.9%)
3. Sindhi (2.25%)
4. Urdu (1.51%)
5. Others (1.18%)

Hindi, namely its dialect Bundeli, is the dominant spoken language in the city. A few people speak Urdu while there is also a large Sindhi community in the city.

== Government and politics ==
=== Administration ===
==== District and division headquarters ====
- Sagar is a district headquarter, 12 tehsils come under the Sagar District administration:

Banda, Bina, Garhakota, Malthone, Rehli, Sagar, Khurai, Shahgarh, Rahatgarh, Deori, Kesli, Jaisinagar.

- Sagar is a division headquarter, 6 districts come under the Sagar Division:
1. Sagar District
2. Damoh District
3. Chhatarpur District
4. Tikamgarh District
5. Panna District
6. Niwari District

==== Government ====
Sagar city is part of Sagar assembly constituency, Shailendra Jain is the MLA from here, He is from Bhartiya Janta Party. Sagar contributes one member to the Lok Sabha. The entire Sagar Assembly is part of the Sagar Lok Sabha, Smt. Lata Wankhede Is an MP from Sagar, Bharatiya Janata Party had been elected as the Member of Parliament in the 2024 Lok Sabha election.

== Civic amenities ==
=== Water and electricity ===
Electricity in Sagar is supplied by the Madhya Pradesh Electricity Board Company Limited, the state's agency.

Major source of water in Sagar are Lakha Banjara Lake, Rajghat Dam and overhead tanks. Sagar Municipal Corporation is divided into 51 wards, water is supplied to every ward through pipeline, water sewage facility is also available here.

=== Healthcare and hospitals ===
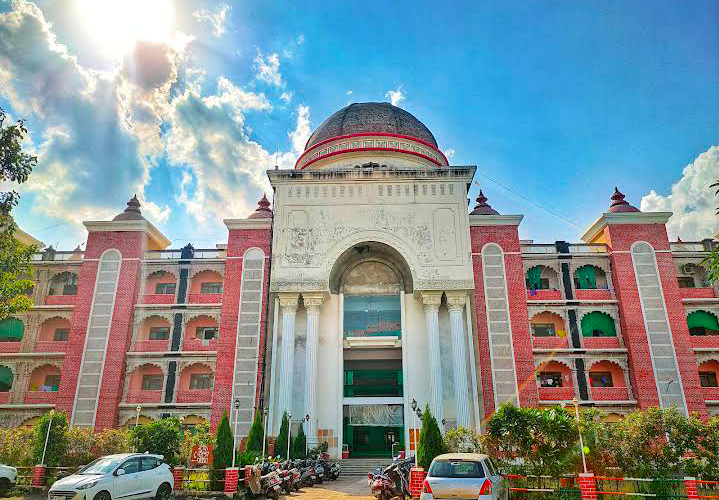
Bhagyodaya Hospital

The city serves as a centre for healthcare in Bundelkhand region. Sagar is a health hub for the surrounding cities and districts. There are many government and private hospitals and clinics operating here.

There is many Government and Private Hospitals are available like District Hospital, Civil Hospital, Dafrin Hospital, Medical College Hospital, Bansal Hospital, Bhagyodaya Hospital and Rai Hospital ets and many more.

== Economy ==
The nominal GDP of the district was estimated at Rs. 30,517 crores in 2020–21. It has the 7th Largest District economy of Madhya Pradesh.

=== Agriculture ===
Agriculture forms the backbone of the Sagar economy. Many districts completely rely on the income generated from agriculture taken up in the city. The farmers use the latest technologies pertaining to the sector of agriculture so that a healthy crop is obtained. A strong agriculture economy has led to an improvement in the living standards of people living in the city of Sagar. The chief crops grown here are chickpeas, wheat, oilseeds, and soghum. Sagar is also into poultry farming, animal husbandry, dairy farming, fisheries, forestry, and cattle fairs.

=== Industry ===
With many proposed large and small scale industries, the economy of Sagar is bound to grow at a fast pace. It is also a major hub for useful minerals.

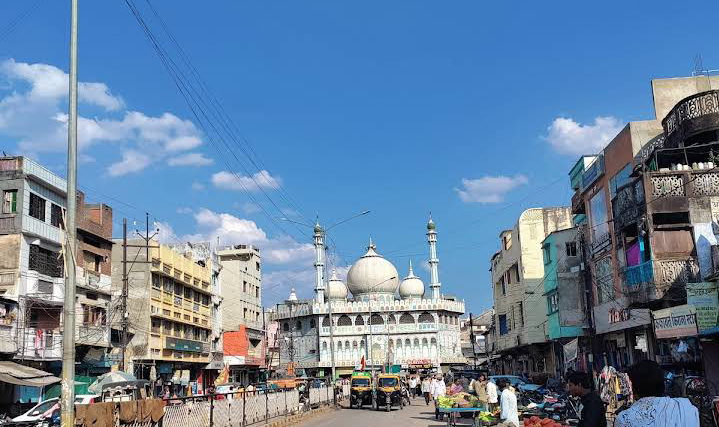
Katra Bazar

The stainless steel complex is also in Sagar. The lakha banjara lake in the centre of the city provides a wonderful panorama. Dr. Hari Singh Gour central university First and one of the oldest universities of Madhya Pradesh established in 1946 is in Sagar. Due to its scenic beauty and proximity to Khajuraho tourism also contributes to strengthening its economy. In Madhya Pradesh, Sagar is the sixteenth largest district in size.

These small scale industries mainly manufacture steel utensils, detergent cake, and powder, agricultural equipment, Agro Fertilizers, food processing, cattle feed, Laminated Glass, welding electrodes, plastic goods, alum, caustic soda, solvent plant, granitbillie stone, pipes, acrylic sheets, PVC cable, acrylic products, incense sticks, all-purpose flour, etc. Beedi (A traditional Tobacco used in India) and Agarbatti making is one of major small manufacturing industry in Sagar.

The north-south corridor passes through Sagar city, hence the hotel industry here has also made considerable progress. Many large educational institutions are located here which make it a centre of education. Which makes a huge contribution to the economy of Sagar.Many shopping malls and complexes are also located in Sagar.

=== Siddhguwan industrial area ===
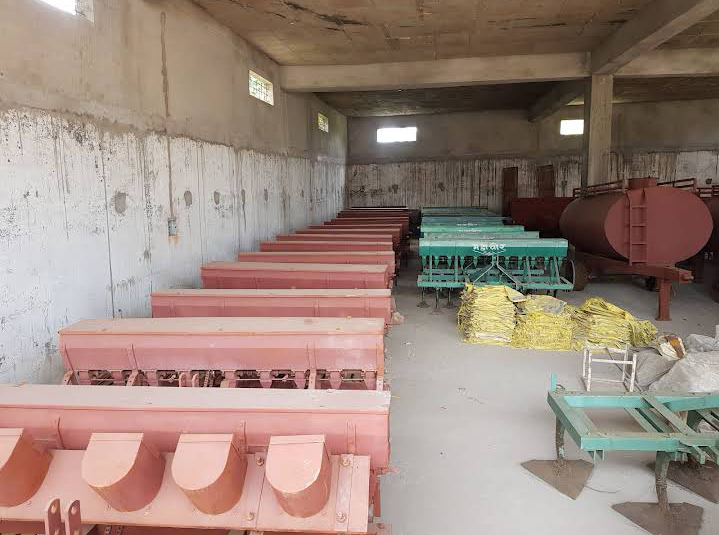
Agro Machine Manufacturing Industry

Siddhguwan is located in Sagar and developed by Madhya Pradesh government and Madhya Pradesh Industrial Development Corporation, it has industries such as oil and flour milling, saw-milling, ghee processing, handloom cotton weaving, packaging, strawboard mfg., food processing, transformers, iron metal and engineering works.

=== Mega industrial park ===
A mega industrial park will be set up over 1,300 acres at Maswasi village as part of the Delhi-Nagpur Industrial Corridor.

This includes units associated with renewable energy, textiles, and agro-processing (such as Unique Sun Power, Vivgyor Energy Infratech, AB Fabrics, Gokaldas & Sons, and Daawat Rice).

=== Solar park ===
There is also a proposal to develop a solar park near Sagar, which will meet the electricity needs here. The total project cost is US$1.26 billion. Along with this, a solar device manufacturing unit will also be developed here.

== Culture and cityscape ==
=== Tourist attractions ===
Sagar has several notable places of interest for tourists.

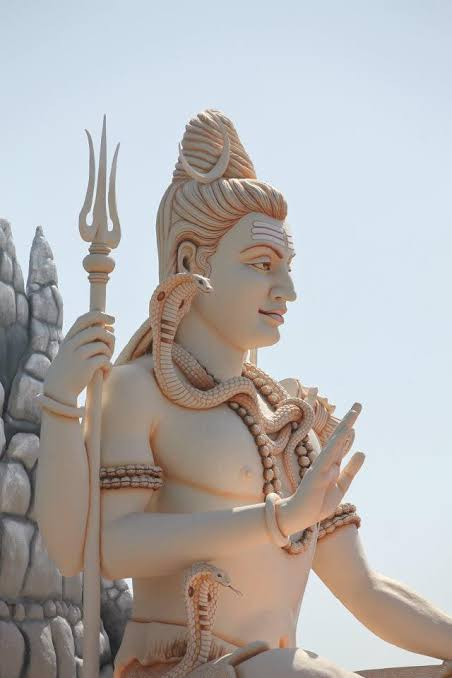
Shiv Shakti Dham Statue

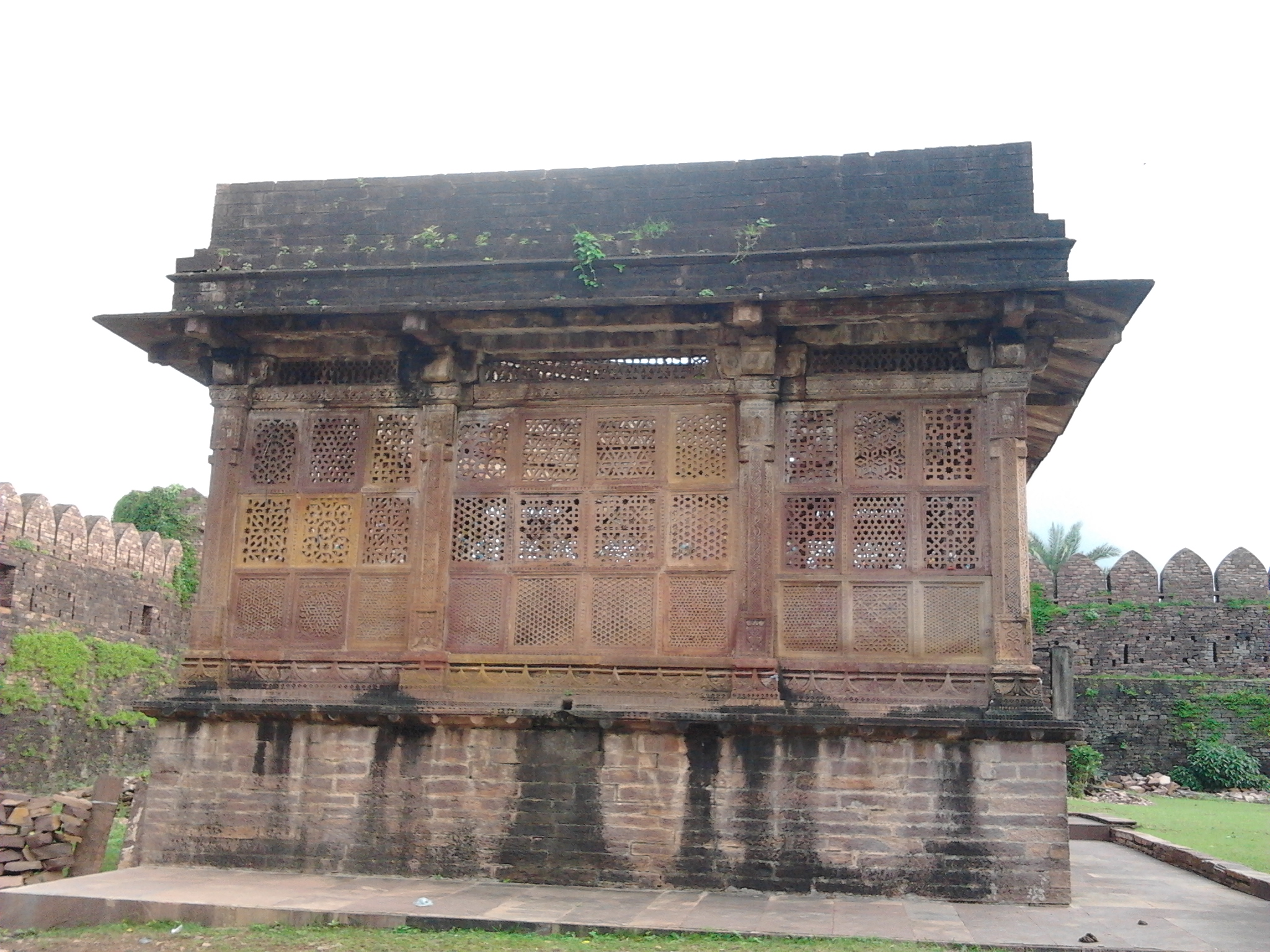
Khimlasa Fort

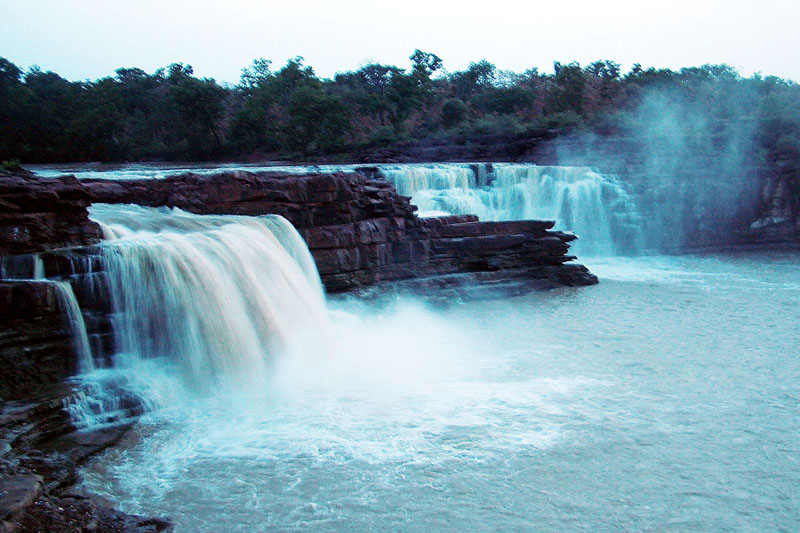
Rahatgarth Waterfall

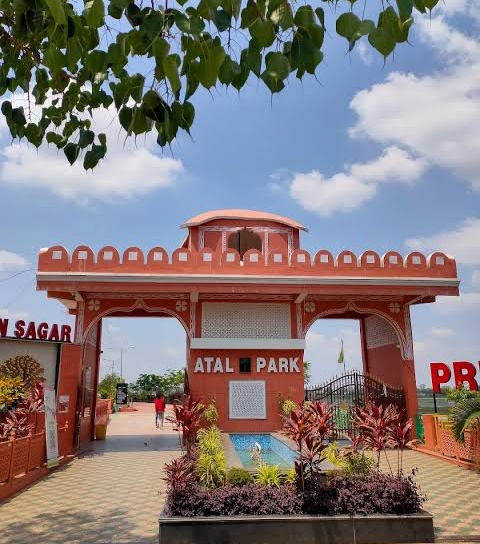
Atal Park Sagar

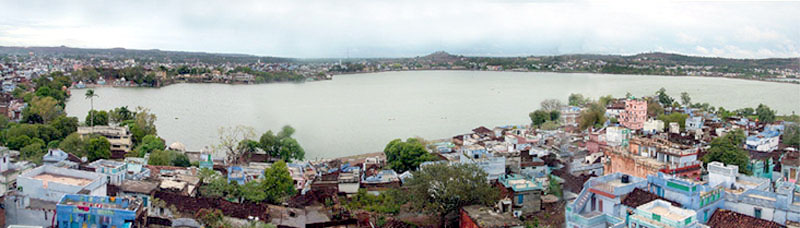
Lakha Banjara Lake

- Jama Masjid at Katra Square - A mosque in Sagar, known for its architecture and religious importance.
- Garhpehra Temple - This is also called old Sagar, was the capital of the Dangi Kingdom. It is situated six miles north of Sagar on Jhansi road. Gadphara still has some historical remains. The fort build on a low range of hills, is approached by a steep road leading to bastion, a rough gateway and a white washed temple on a platform. There are remains of a summer residence called a Shish Mahal or Glass palace of the Dangi Rular. It is a square building very much like a Muslim tomb consisting of two stores, each room having a veranda all around. The glassed tiles of various colours are fixed alternatively in the panel of the battlement and in the ribbing of the domes. It is attributed to Raja Jaisingh who is supposed to have live about 200 years ago. In the neighbour hood is a tomb which is treated as an object of worship.Below the hill toward the north is small lake called Motital.
- Eran - An ancient site lying at the junction of Bina and Reuta rivers, 6 miles from Bamora station on the central railways. By its natural situation, Eran is at the gate of Bundelkhand on one side and Malwa at the other. The name is derived from the abundant growth of ERAKA, a sort of grass of emollient and diligent properties. The village of Eran has a most interesting collection of archaeological relics. There is a fort in rulings attributed to the Dangis, who formerly dominated over this region. The site had a number of Vishnu shrines but nothing now remains except some of the lower courses of masonry, four standing columns with there architrave and some beams and part of door ways. The Principal statue is a colossal Varaha about 10 feet high. The excavation conducted by the Department of Archaeology of the University of Sagar have yielded relics similar to those found at Maheshwar and Tripuri showing that Eran formed the Northern most limit of the Chalcolithic culture in Madhya Pradesh.
- Harsiddhi Devi Mandir, Rangir - A village situated 10 miles from Rehli and 21 miles from Sagar on Sagar Rehli Road on the bank of the Dahar river. It was site of an engagement between Chatrasak Bundela and Khaliq, the Mugal Fauzdar of Damoni. On the adjoining Hill stands a temple of Harsiddi Devi in whose honour fairs are held in the months of Asvina and Chaitra. The Chaitra fair is an important one and large number of people visit the temple. The image of the goddess is held in great veneration and people believe that she changes her form thrice every day, as a child at dawn, a young girl at mid day and an old women in the evening. A government rest house of forest department is located here
- Khimlasa
- Rahatgarh Waterfall
- Nauradehi Wildlife Sanctuary
- Sagar lake - a beautiful and historic lake. The history of Sagar is linked to this lake. There are many famous ghats and temples located on its banks among which Vrindavan Bagh temple, Vitthal Mandir and Chakra Ghat are prominent.
- Aabchand Caves - In the ravines of river Gadheri, ensconced in the dense growth of Abchand reserve forest (23°45′N 78°55′E), about 22 miles (35 km) east of Sagar on the Sagar-Damoh road, exist about a dozen rock-cut caves with paintings of the same type as found at Singhanpur and Adamgarh. The largest cave is about 40 feet in length and its walls contain more than a dozen paintings showing activities of the pre-historic men. The hunting scenes represent individual or group of hunters. They are equipped with bows and arrows, spears and other weapons. The game animals shown in these paintings, are bison's, bulls, deer antelopes, tiger, boars etc. In one of the Shelters a fierce fight between two tigers is fitfully depicted. The primitive people seem to have amused themselves with songs and dances. At one place seven figures are shown dancing hand-in- hand in a row. In front of them are played instruments like drums, dhapli and flutes. The colours used in these paintings are yellow, green, red, black, and white. The red colour shows different shades, dark orche and pink. The super- imposition or overlapping is also clear in some cases. There are also some symbolic representations such as the swastikia, taurine, cross and the tree within railing symbols.
- Mandi Bamora, Tehsil Khurai – A large village with a railway station on the Bina-Itarsi line of the Central Railway. There is a ruined temple built of stone without mortar similar to the one at Janjgir. The date of erection is not known, but it is believed to be very ancient. It contains a small stone image of a Varaha and one of a horse with rider. In one corner is an image of Shiva placed there since the temple passed out of its original use. There are also Buddhist ruins in the village.

=== Cuisine ===
Sweets in Sagar's local delicacy include Chironji ki Barfi, Surkhi ki Mangodi, Gujrati Namkeen, Samosa and Gujhiya .

- Mangodi Or Bara - Mangodi is a type of fried dish, in which moong dal is divided, mixed with spices and fried in hot oil, here people eat it with great enthusiasm.
- Namkeen - This is a snack prepared in Saugor which is very much liked here.
- Barfi - It's a very popular sweet made in Sagar, the origin of making this sweet also came from here, this sweet is prepared from local dry fruits.

== Transportation ==
=== By air ===
The nearest domestic airport is Jabalpur Airport in Jabalpur, roughly four hour drive from Sagar. The second nearest Domestic Airport is Raja Bhoj Airport, Bhopal, 200 km from the city. It is well connected to a spectrum of cities like Bengaluru, Delhi, Mumbai, Indore, Bilaspur, Hyderabad and Jagdalpur via IndiGo and Alliance Air.

=== By rail ===
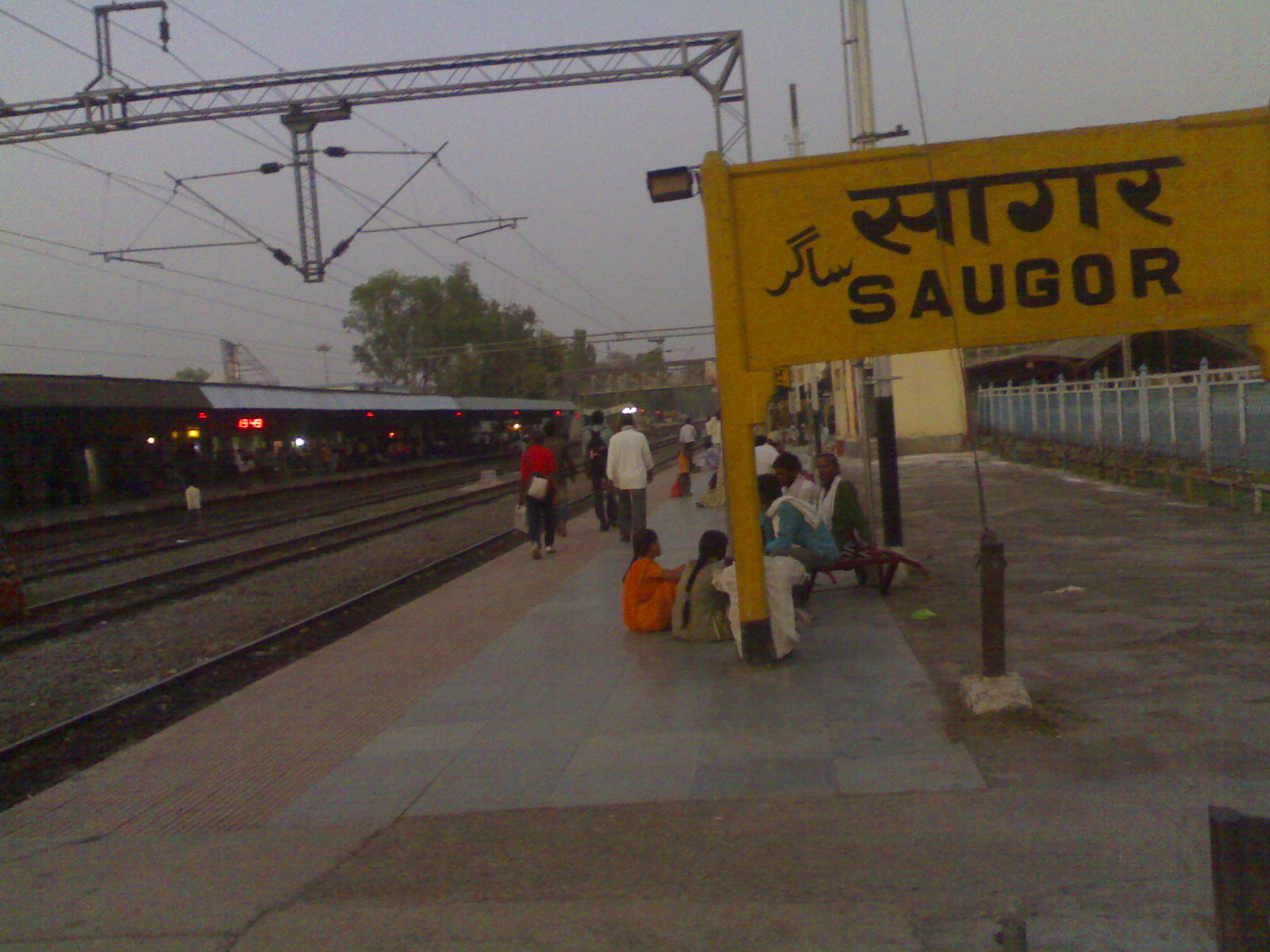
Sagar Railway Station

It has its own Railway Station named as Sagar Railway Station which is connected to the major cities of Madhya Pradesh. It is well connected to the cities such as Delhi, Gwalior, Agra, Mathura, Jammu, Amritsar, Mumbai, Bangalore, Bhopal, Chennai, Goa, Hyderabad, Vishakhapattnam, Indore, Ratlam, Kolkata, Patna, Jabalpur, Nagpur, Bhuvneshwar, Raipur.

Apart from this, Sagar City also has other railway stations Makronia and Ratona where railway facilities are available for passengers.

=== By road ===
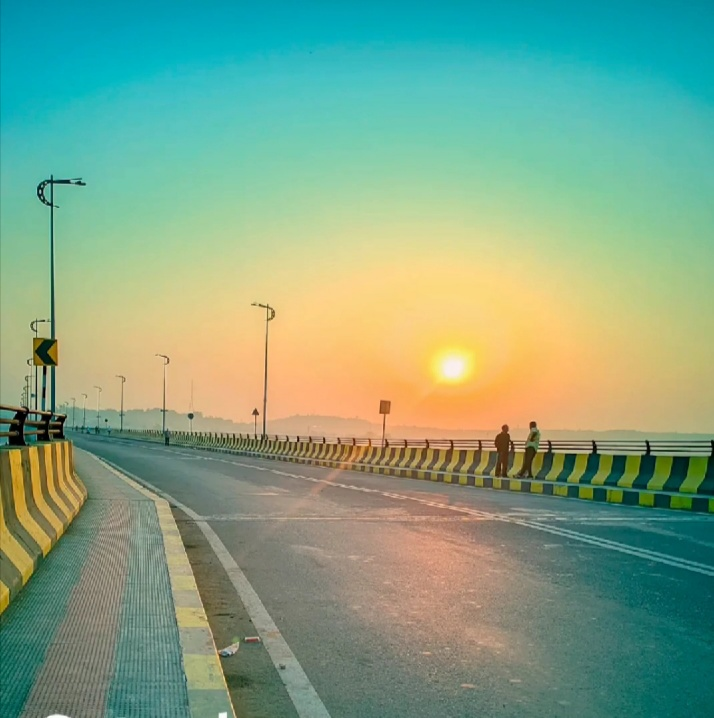
A Road in Sagar

Sagar is 21 km from Karrapur, 45 km from Rehli, 64 km from Garhakota, 83 km from Damoh, 160 km from Jabalpur, 181 km from Bhopal, 208 km from Jhansi, 375 km from Indore through Madhya Pradesh State Road Transport Corporation (MPSRTC) and some private travel services.

Many major national highways pass through Sagar, connecting it to major cities of India.

- NH 44 connects to Agra, Gwalior, Jhansi, and Nagpur.
- NH 934 connects to Chhatarpur, Mahoba and Kanpur.
- NH 146 connects to Vidisha, Bhopal and Indore.

Nearby major cities like Damoh, Panna, Tikamgarh, Jabalpur, Katni, Gadarwara, Hoshangabad, and Guna are connected with major state highways. Daily bus service is available in Sagar, including private buses.

== Sports ==
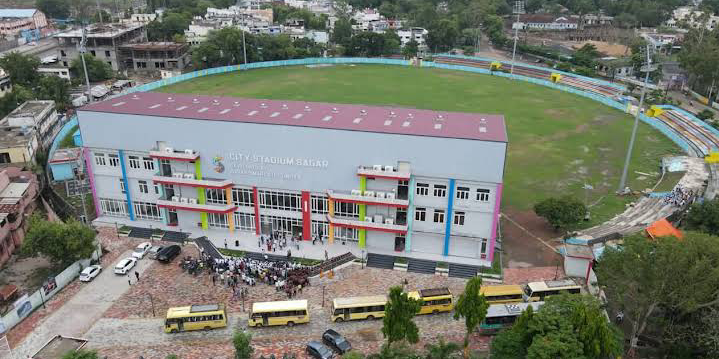
City Stadium

Sagar has a cricket stadium of Madhya Pradesh Cricket Association. Also known as Chandu Sarwate Stadium. It was made considering all norms of BCCI so that Ranji Trophy matches can be played. The stadium was established in 2010 when the stadium hosted a match of Maharaja Yeshwant Rao Memorial Inter Divisional Tournament 2010/11 between Sagar and Gwalior. other ground are

- University Teaching Department Ground, Sagar
- Sagar City Stadium

== Education ==
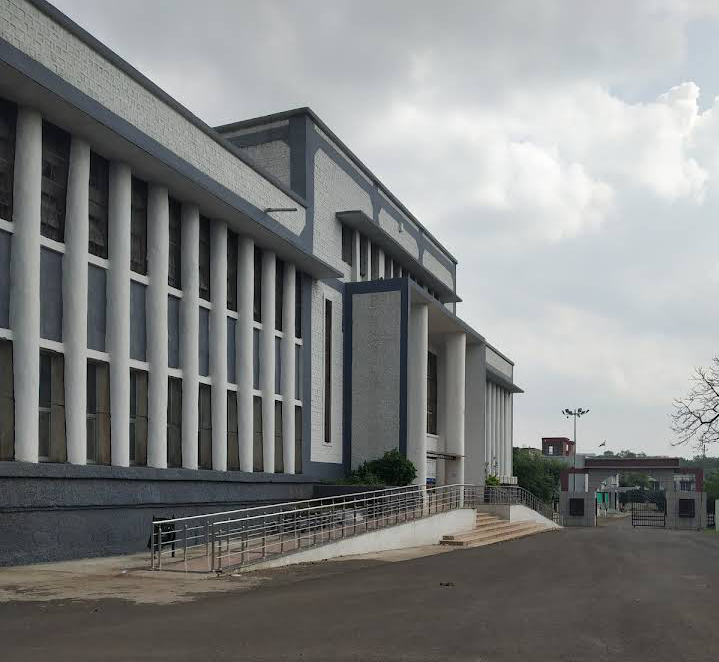
Dr. Harisingh Gaur University

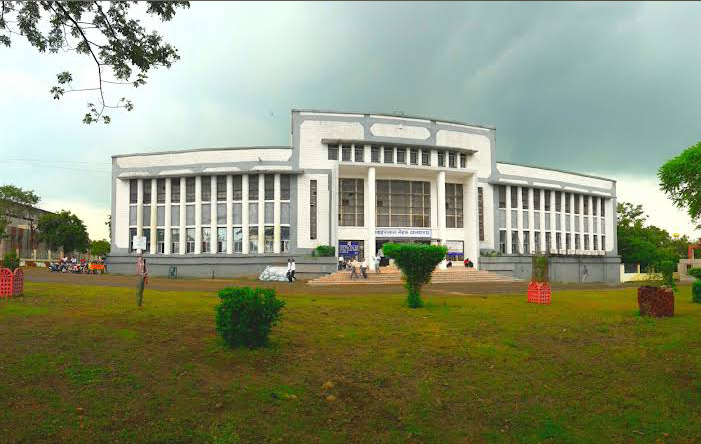
Dr. Harisingh Gaur University

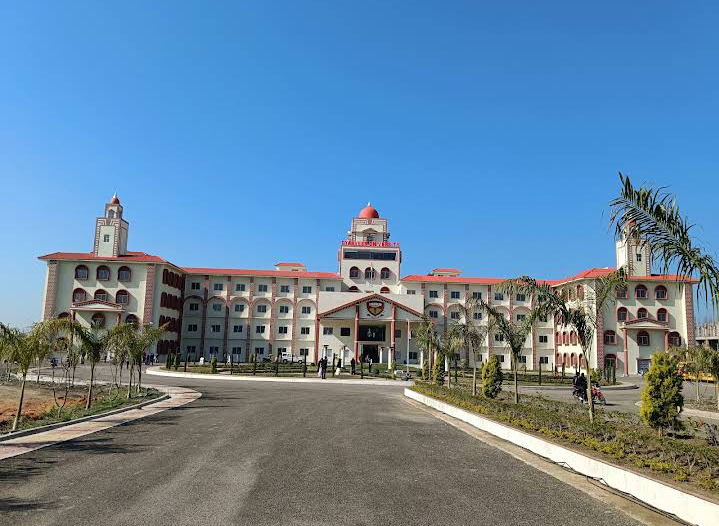
Gyanveer University

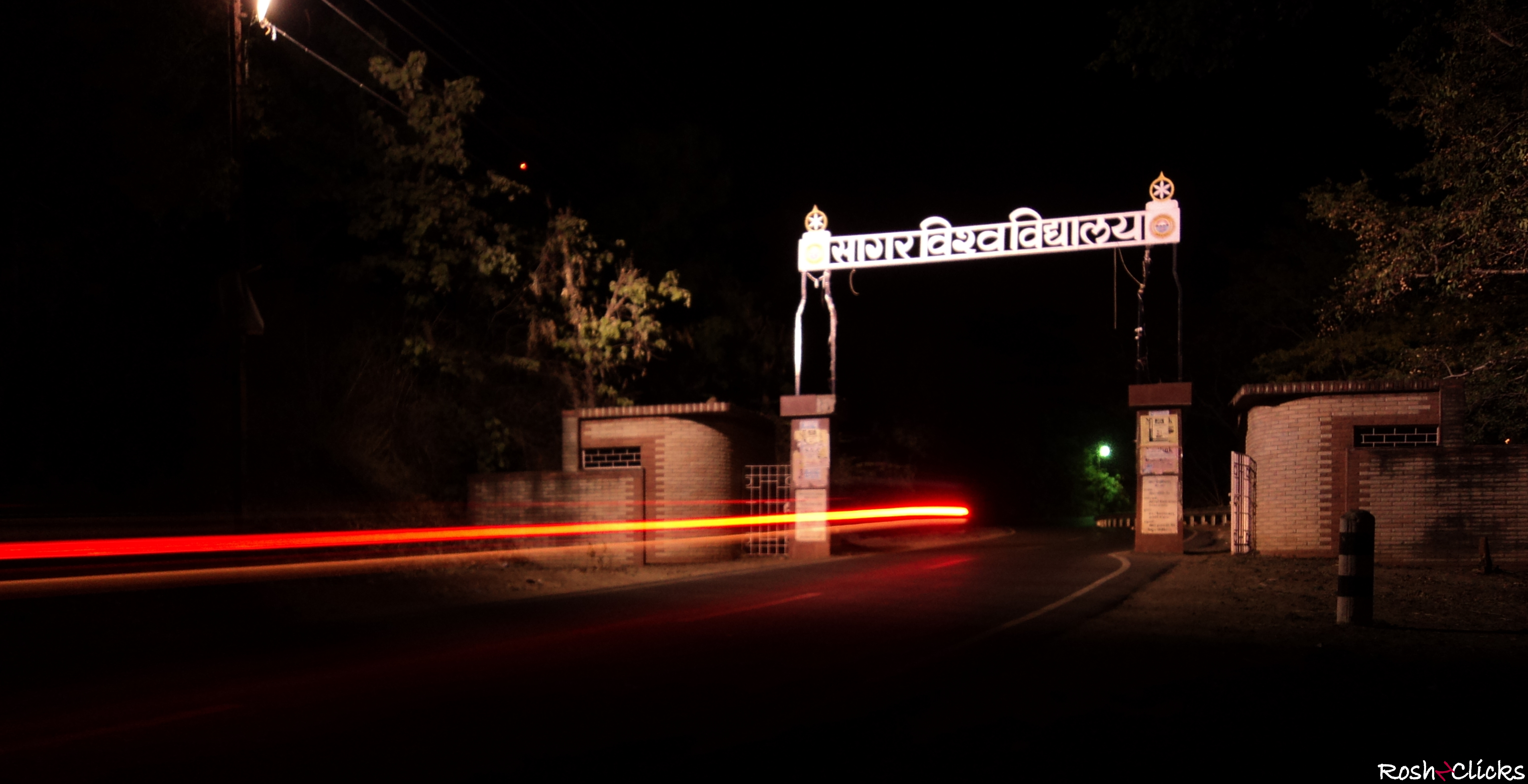
Sagar University

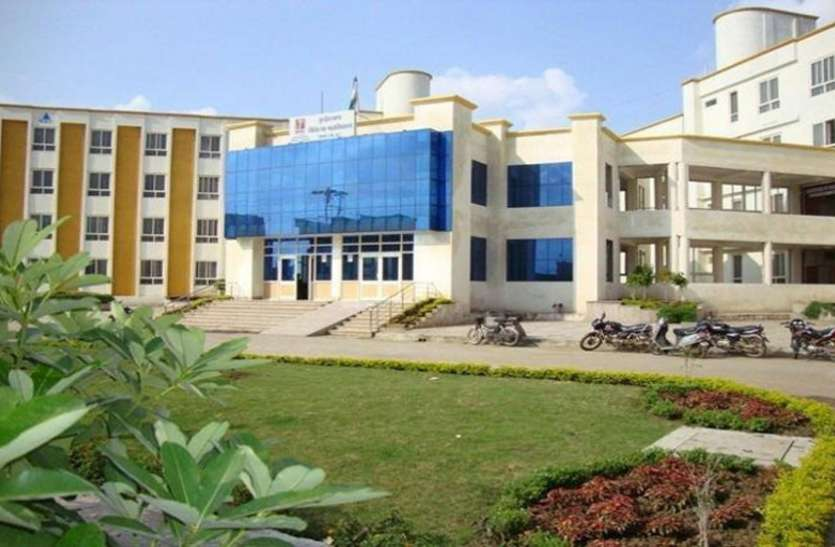
Bundelkhand Medical College

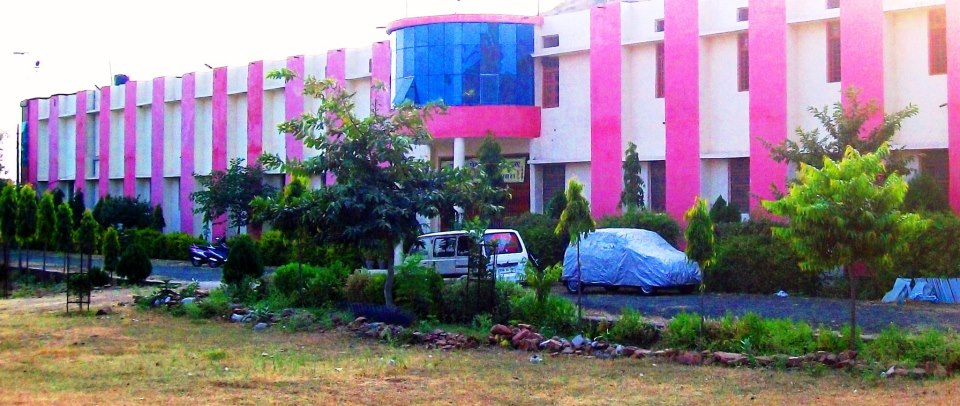
Homoeopathic Medical College

- Bundelkhand Medical College, established in 2007
- Dr. Hari Singh Gour University, formerly known as Sagar University, was founded on 18 July 1946 by Hari Singh Gour.
- Indira Gandhi Engineering College, established in 1981
- Institute of Engineering and Technology, established in 2022
- Kendriya Vidyalaya Sagar, established in 1964
- Sagar Homoeopathic Medical College, established in 2002

== Notable people ==
- Gopal Bhargava, Indian politician
- Hari Singh Gour, pleader, jurist, parliamentarian, social reformer, First Vice-Chancellor of Delhi University
- Kamta Prasad Guru, Indian Author and Author of Hindi Grammar
- Pannalal Jain, Indian Jain scholar (1911–2001)
- Sudha Jain, Indian politician
- Virendra Kumar Khatik, Indian politician
- Rameez Khan, Indian cricketer
- Kshamasagar, Indian Jain Saint
- Mahendra Mewati, Theatre and film actor
- Govind Namdev, Television and film actor
- Sachin Nayak, Indian film actor
- Padmakar, a Ritikal poet
- Vitthalbhai Patel, an Indian poet, lyricist, and senior Congress leader
- Ashutosh Rana, Indian actor, producer, author and television personality
- Vishwanath Rao Ringe, Indian folk Singer, Hindustani Classical Music vocalist and composer
- Chandu Sarwate, an Indian cricketer
- Mukesh Tiwari, Indian theatre and film actor
- Ramkumar Verma, Indian poet, author and writer
