= List of cities in Bundelkhand =

Bundelkhand is a vast area spread across the regions of Madhya Pradesh and Uttar Pradesh in India. Districts of Sagar Division, Jhansi Division and Chitrakoot Division come under this.

== List ==
As of Population Census 2011 Bundelkhand's Major cities list is :-

Rank	Name	District	Population (2011)	Type
1	Jhansi	Jhansi District	5,05,693	Municipal Corporation
2	Sagar	Sagar District	3,70,208	Municipal Corporation
3	Orai	Jalaun District	1,90,575	Municipality
4	Banda	Banda District	1,60,474	Municipality
5	Chhatarpur	Chhatarpur District	1,42,128	Municipality
6	Damoh	Damoh District	1,39,561	Municipality
7	Lalitpur	Lalitpur District	1,33,305	Municipality
8	Datia	Datia District	1,00,284	Municipality
9	Mahoba	Mahoba District	95,216	Municipality
10	Tikamgarh	Tikamgarh District	79,106	Municipality
11	Bina Etawa	Sagar District	69,564	Municipality
12	Chitrakoot	Chitrakoot District	66,426	Municipality
13	Raath	Hamirpur District	65,056	Municipality
14	Mauranipur	Jhansi District	61,449	Municipality
15	Panna	Panna District	59,091	Municipality
