= Sudha Jain =

Indian politician

- Born: Sudha Jain; 13 November 1949 (age 76); Sagar Madhya Pradesh India
- Occupations: Politician, Advocate
- Years active: 30
- Children: Two Daughters

Sudha Jain (born 1949) is an Indian politician from the Sagar city of the state of Madhya Pradesh. She represents the Bharatiya Janata Party. She won the Madhya Pradesh Legislative Assembly elections consecutively for three terms i.e. 1993, 1998 and 2003 from the Sagar constituency. She was also a minister in Madhya Pradesh Government in 2007. She was the first woman MLA from Sagar constituency. She was denied ticket in the 2008 election and the then district Bhartiya Janta Party (BJP) president Shailendra Jain filled in her seat. She is a lawyer by profession.

== Early life ==
She was born on 13 October 1949 in the Sagar city of Madhya Pradesh State of India. Her father M. L. Jain was a businessman and an ardent RSS (Rashtriya Swamsevak Sangh) follower. She did her Master of Arts (M.A.) and L.L.B. (Bachelor of Law) degrees from Sagar University. In LLB course she topped in the university and hence was awarded the gold medals. She practiced law in the district court of Sagar for 16 years.

== Political career ==
In 1991 she became the chairperson of the M.P. Social Welfare Board. The post bore the rank of a cabinet minister in the government of Madhya Pradesh. Subsequently she won the Madhya Pradesh Legislative Assembly elections consecutively for three terms i.e. 1993, 1998 and 2003 from the Sagar constituency. In the year 2008 she became the state vice president of the Bhartiya Janta Party for Madhya Pradesh. In the year 2009 she became the district president of Sagar district of Bhartiya Janta Party, and continued as president in 2010 as well. In 2011 she became the chairperson of the Women Finance and Development Corporation of Madhya Pradesh. She was instrumental in getting a bill passed against meat export in the Madhya Pradesh legislative assembly, which she did by getting inspired by Jain muni Praman sagar. She was also instrumental in getting a dam "Rajghat" constructed in Sagar as a permanent solution to the water supply problem of Sagar city. She also succeeded in getting a medical college established in Sagar city and getting the status of a central university to the Sagar university. She also received the best Member of Legislative Assembly award of Madhya Pradesh.
