= Kamta Prasad Guru =

Hindi Grammar Expert

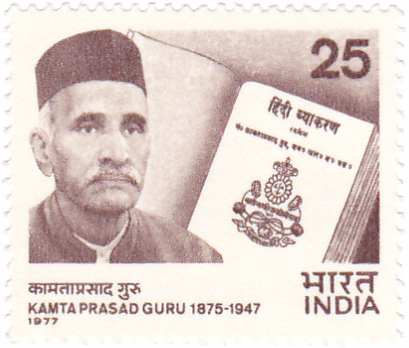
- Kamta Prasad Guru on a 1977 stamp of India.
- Born: 24 December 1875; Saugor, Central Provinces and Berar, Dominion of India
- Died: 16 November 1947 (aged 71); Jabalpur, Central Provinces and Berar, Dominion of India

Kamta Prasad Guru (1875 – 16 November 1947) was an expert on grammar of Hindi language. He was the author of the book Hindi vyakarana. He was born in Sagar, which is today in Madhya Pradesh state in India. His Hindi grammar book has been translated into many foreign languages. Kamta Prasad Guru died in Jabalpur. The Government of India issued a commemorative stamp in his honour in 1977.

== Introduction ==
In 1920, he edited 'Balsakha' and 'Saraswati' in the Indian Press of Prayag for almost a year. He had good knowledge of various languages. These authorities of Hindi grammar are considered scholars. However, his creative talent was versatile.

== Works ==
Major works: 'Satya', 'Prem', 'Parvati', 'Yashoda' (novel); ‘Bhaumasur Vadh’ and ‘Vinay Pachasa’ (Brajbhasha poetry); ‘Padya Pushpavali’, ‘Sudarshan’ (mythological drama) ‘Hindustani Etiquette’ etc.
