= Lakha Banjara Lake =

Lake in Madhya Pradesh, India

Sagar Lake
- Lakha Banjara Lake
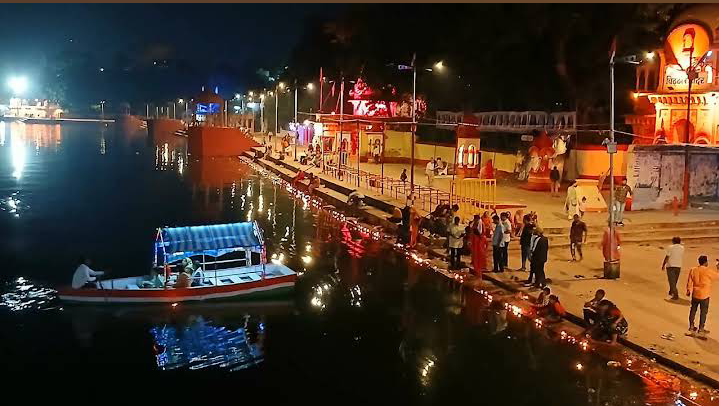

- Location of Sagar Lake in Madhya Pradesh Sagar Lake (India)
- Location: Sagar, Madhya Pradesh
- Coordinates: 23.83°N 78.74°E
- Settlements: Saugor

Lakha Banjara Lake, also known as Sagar lake, is a lake in the center of Sagar city of Sagar District in Madhya Pradesh, India.

== Location and name ==
This lake is popular by this name Lakha Banjara Sagar. This lake has been named Lakha Banjara Sagar Lake in honor of the sacrifice and martyrdom of the great warrior Lakha Banjara. A statue of the 21 feet brave warrior Lakhishah Banjara has also been installed in this lake. Sagar city is situated on the northern, western and eastern banks of this lake. Pathariya hill is in the south, where the university campus is located. Sagar fort is in its north-west. This lake has a great influence on the location and structure of the city. The lake has been the source of drinking water for the city for a long time.

== Formation ==
There is no authentic information available about the origin of Sagar Lake, but many legends are popular. The most common story among these is about the sacrifice of the daughter-in-law and son of the great hero Lakha Banjara. Experts believe that it could be a lake formed naturally, which later some king or community might have dug out to make it more useful for the public and given it the shape of a huge lake. But this is only a guess because there is no evidence available for this. When Udanshah built a small fort here in 1660 and established the first settlement at Parkota village, the pond was already present.

There is also a legend that Lakha Banjara sacrificed his daughter-in-law and son for this lake. Lakhishah Banjara was a hero in some Asian countries, who had an independent army and his own empire. He had dedicated his life for the welfare of the people, he was considered as Lokraja. That is why he is popular by the name Lakhishah, Lakhiray. Shah and Rai means king.

== Tourism ==
There are a number of tourist attractions around the lake, with several ghats and temples located on its banks. These include Vrindavan Bagh temple, Vitthal Mandir and Chakra Ghat. Sagar lake is a natural and historical lake. The history of Sagar is linked to this lake.
