= Shalendra Kumar Jain =

Indian politician

Member of Madhya Pradesh Legislative Assembly
- Incumbent
- Assumed office 2008
- Preceded by: Sudha Jain
- Constituency: Sagar

Personal details
- Political party: Bharatiya Janata Party
- Profession: Politician

Shalendra Kumar Jain is an Indian politician from Madhya Pradesh. He is a four time elected Member of the Madhya Pradesh Legislative Assembly from 2008, 2013, 2018, and 2023, representing Sagar, Madhya Pradesh Assembly constituency, as a Member of the Bharatiya Janata Party.

== Political career ==
In the 2008 Madhya Pradesh Legislative Assembly election, Shailendra was nominated by the Bharatiya Janata Party to contest from the Sagar Assembly constituency, facing Indian National Congress candidate Prakash Jain. Shailendra won the election by a margin of 20,851 votes, securing a total of 64,351 votes, while Jain received 56,128 votes.

In the 2013 Assembly election, Shailendra again contested from the same constituency, this time against INC candidate Sushil Tiwari. He was re-elected with a reduced margin of 8,223 votes, receiving 64,351 votes to Tiwari's 56,128 votes.

During the 2018 Assembly election, the INC fielded a new candidate, Navy Jain, to contest against Shailendra. Shailendra won the election by a margin of 17,366 votes, securing 67,227 votes, while Jain received 49,861 votes.

In the most recent 2023 Assembly election, Shailendra contested against another new INC candidate, Smt. Nidhi Sunil Jain. He won the election, becoming a four-time elected member of the Madhya Pradesh Legislative Assembly, with a margin of 15,021 votes. Shailendra garnered 74,769 votes, while the Congress candidate received 59,748 votes.

== See also ==
- 2008 Madhya Pradesh Legislative Assembly election
- Madhya Pradesh Legislative Assembly
