= Bandri, Madhya Pradesh =

Town in India

Bandri Bandri
- City
- Location within Madhya Pradesh Location within India
- Coordinates: 24.04°N 78.63°E
- Country: India
- State: Madhya Pradesh
- District: Sagar
- Elevation: 424 m (1,391 ft)

Population (2011)
  - Total: 10,802

Languages
  - Official: Hindi
- Vehicle registration: MP-15

Bandri is a town and nagar panchayat in Sagar district, Madhya Pradesh; Khurai is the nearest city from it.

== Geography ==
Bandri is located in the northern part of the district. Bandri's pin code is 470442 and it is 30 km (18.6411 miles) away from the district headquarters.

== Administration ==
Bandri is part of the Khurai Assembly. bhupendra singh is city's MLA.

Bandri is divided into 15 wards for which elections are held every five years.

== Transportation ==
Bandri is well connected with roads. Daily bus service runs from here to Sagar and Khurai. NH 44 passes through here, connecting it to other major state cities.

== See also ==
- Sagar District
- Khurai
- Malthon
