= Sagar Homoeopathic Medical College =

- Type: Private
- Established: 2002
- Academic affiliations: Dr. Hari Singh Gour University
- Director: P.K. Tamrakar
- Location: Sagar, Madhya Pradesh, India; 23.873°N 78.727°E
- Campus: Bhainsa Pahari, Pagara
- Website: sagarhomoeocollege.com

Sagar Homoeopathic Medical College & Hospital Research Center is a homoeopathic college, situated in Sagar, Madhya Pradesh, and affiliated to Dr. Hari Singh Gour University (Sagar University).

Established in 2002, the college offers bachelor's degree in the field of Homeopathic Medicine (BHMS) and is recognised by M.P. State Council of Homoeopathy, and Central Council of Homoeopathy, Government of India.
