= Jarwaans Shareef =

Village in Madhya Pradesh, India

Jarwaans Jarbaans
- suburb
- Country: India
- State: Madhya Pradesh
- District: Sagar district

Area
  - Total: 36 km^{2} (14 sq mi)

Population (2001)
  - Total: 1,250
  - Density: 97/km^{2} (250/sq mi)

Languages
  - Official: Hindi
- Time zone: UTC+5:30 (IST)
- PIN: 470118
- Telephone code: 07581
- Vehicle registration: MP- 15
- Coastline: 0 kilometres (0 mi)
- Nearest city: Rahatgarh
- Avg. summer temperature: 43 °C (109 °F)
- Avg. winter temperature: 03 °C (37 °F)

Jarwaans, also spelled as Jarbaas, was once a village, and is now a suburb in Khurai City in Madhya Pradesh.

== Demographics ==
Religions in Jarwans (Rural)
| Religion | Percent |
| Hindus | 98% |
| Muslims | 2% |
| Christians | 0% |
| Jains | 0% |
| Others† | 1.1% |
Distribution of religions †Includes Sikhs (0%), Buddhists (0).
