= Malthon =

City in Madhya Pradesh, India

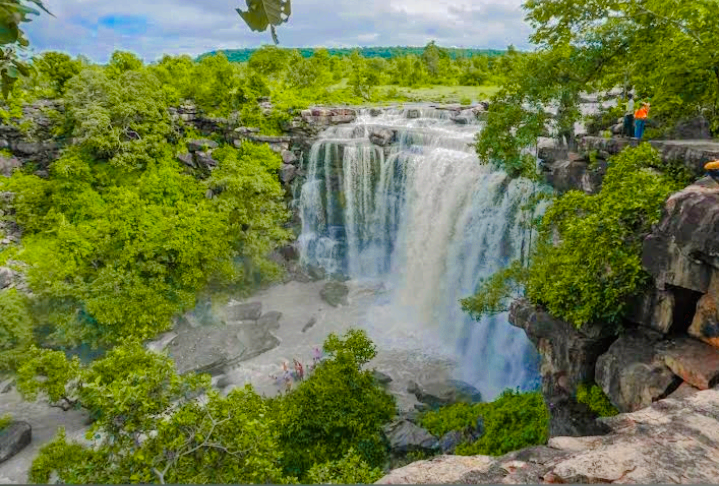
- Kanakdhar Water Fall

- Location within Madhya Pradesh
- Coordinates: 24.205°N 78.364°E
- Country: India
- State: Madhya Pradesh
- District: Sagar district

Population (2011)
  - Total: 10,764
- Time zone: UTC+5:30
- Postal Index Number: 470441
- Vehicle registration: MP-15

Malthon is a city and a nagar panchayat in the Sagar district of Madhya Pradesh, India. It's also a tehsil headquarter and Development Block.

Malthon is a historical places, it's famous for malthone fort and Jawala devi temple which is located in malthone town and kanakdhar water fall which is 10 km away from Malthone.

== Geography ==
Malthon located on 24.205°N 78.364°E Malthon situated on NH 44 in northern part of district, The region is predominantly agrarian.

== Demographics ==
The Malthon village has population of 10764 of which 5664 are males while 5100 are females as per Population Census 2011.literacy rate of Malthon village was 76.11 %

== Transport ==
Malthone is well connected by roads. It's connected to Khurai, Bina, Khimlasa, Sagar, Banda with roads. Daily bus service available here.

== Notable People ==
• Rajaram Jain – Born 1929, renowned Indologist, Sanskritist and Prakrit Scholar from Malthone.

== See also ==
- Sagar District
- Khurai
- Barodiya Kalan
- Bandri
