= Sagar, Madhya Pradesh Assembly constituency =

Constituency of the Madhya Pradesh legislative assembly in India

Coordinates: 23.84°N 78.74°E

Sagar
- Constituency No. 41 for the Madhya Pradesh Legislative Assembly

Constituency details
- Country: India
- Region: Central India
- State: Madhya Pradesh
- District: Sagar
- Lok Sabha constituency: Sagar
- Established: 1951
- Reservation: None

Member of Legislative Assembly
- 16th Madhya Pradesh Legislative Assembly
- Incumbent Shalendra Kumar Jain
- Party: Bharatiya Janata Party
- Elected year: 2023
- Preceded by: Sudha Jain

Sagar is one of the 230 Vidhan Sabha (Legislative Assembly) constituencies of Madhya Pradesh state in central India. This constituency came into existence in 1951, as one of the 184 Vidhan Sabha constituencies of Madhya Pradesh state.

== Overview ==
Sagar (constituency number 41) is one of the 8 Vidhan Sabha constituencies located in Sagar district. This constituency presently covers the Sagar Municipal Corporation and Gaurnagar Outgrowth of Sagar tehsil of the district.

Sagar is part of Sagar Lok Sabha constituency along with seven other Vidhan Sabha segments, namely, Bina, Surkhi, Naryoli and Khurai in this district and Kurwai, Sironj and Shamshabad in Vidisha district.

== Members of Legislative Assembly ==
Madhya Pradesh Legislative Assembly
Year	Member	Party
1952	Mohammad Shafi Mohammad Subrati	Indian National Congress
1957	Mohammad Shafi Mohammad Subrati	Indian National Congress
1962	Mohammad Shafi Mohammad Subrati	Indian National Congress
1967	D. Jain	Indian National Congress
1972	Jwalaprasad Jyotish	Indian National Congress
1977	Shivkumar Jwalaprasad	Janata Party
1980	Shivkumar Jwalaprasad	Indian National Congress (Indira)
1985	Prakash Motilal Jain	Indian National Congress
1990	Prakash Motilal Jain	Indian National Congress
1993	Sudha Jain	Bharatiya Janata Party
1998	Sudha Jain	Bharatiya Janata Party
2003	Sudha Jain	Bharatiya Janata Party
2008	Shalendra Kumar Jain	Bharatiya Janata Party
2013	Shalendra Kumar Jain	Bharatiya Janata Party
2018	Shalendra Kumar Jain	Bharatiya Janata Party
2023	Shalendra Kumar Jain	Bharatiya Janata Party

== Election results ==
=== 2023 ===
2023 Madhya Pradesh Legislative Assembly election: Sagar
Party	Candidate	Votes	%	±%
BJP	Shalendra Kumar Jain	74,769	52.9	+1.94
INC	Nidhi Sunil Jain	59,748	42.27	+4.48
AAP	Mukesh Jain	1,648	1.17	+0.87
NOTA	None of the above	639	0.45	−0.15
Majority		15,021	10.63	−2.54
Turnout		141,351	67.45	+1.95
BJP hold		Swing		

=== 2018 ===
2018 Madhya Pradesh Legislative Assembly election: Sagar
Party	Candidate	Votes	%	±%
BJP	Shailendra Jain	67,227	50.96	
INC	Navy Jain	49,861	37.79	
BSP	Santosh Prajapati	5,177	3.92	
Independent	Ankleshwar Dubey (Anni)	1,778	1.35	
SP	Jagdish Yadav	1,748	1.32	
NOTA	None of the above	796	0.6	
Majority		17,366	13.17	
Turnout		131,932	65.5	

== See also ==
- Sagar
