= Padmakar =

Ritikal poet (c. 1753 – c. 1833)

Padmakar Bhatt
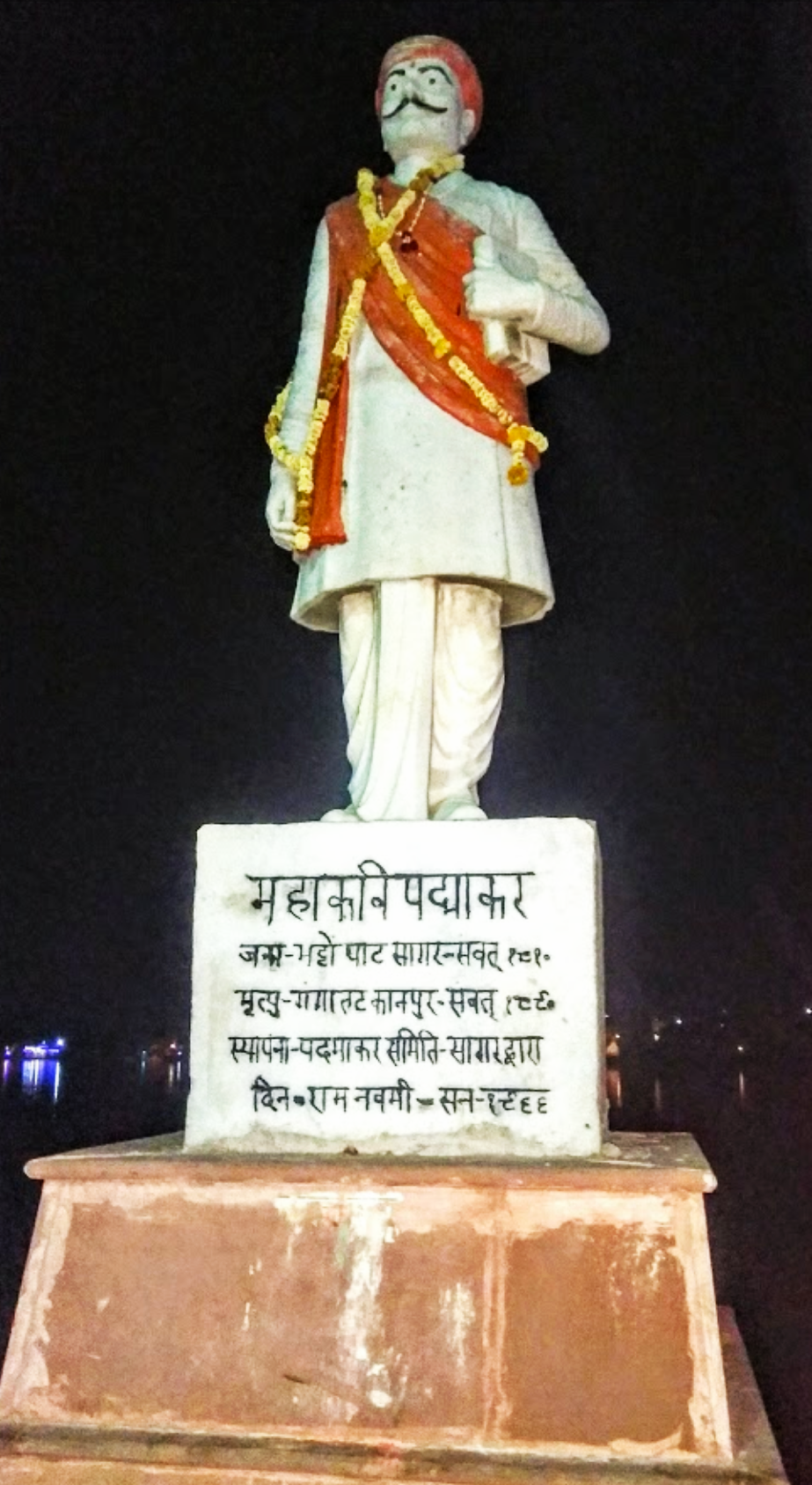
- Kavi Padmakar
- Born: Padmakar c. 1753; Saugor, Madhya Pradesh
- Died: c. 1833; Ganga Ghat, Kanpur, Uttar Pradesh
- Occupation: Poet, writer, scholar and administrator
- Genre: Epic Poetry

Padmakar (c. 1753 – c. 1833) was a Ritikal poet. His full name was Padmakar Bhatt. He belonged to a family of scholars and poets so his family was called "Kavishwar".

== Major works ==
Some of the famous works of Padmakar are Jagdwinod, Padmabharan, Prabodh Pachasa, Himmatbahadur Virudawali and Ganga-Lahari.
