= Bundeli language =

Indo-Aryan language spoken in India

Bundeli
- बुन्देली
- The word "Bundeli" written in Devanagari script
- Native to: India
- Region: Bundelkhand
- Native speakers: 5.6 million (2011); Census results conflate some speakers with Hindi.
- Language family: Indo-European: Indo-Iranian; Indo-Aryan; Central; Western Hindi; Bundeli
- Writing system: Devanagari

Language codes
- ISO 639-3: bns
- Glottolog: bund1253
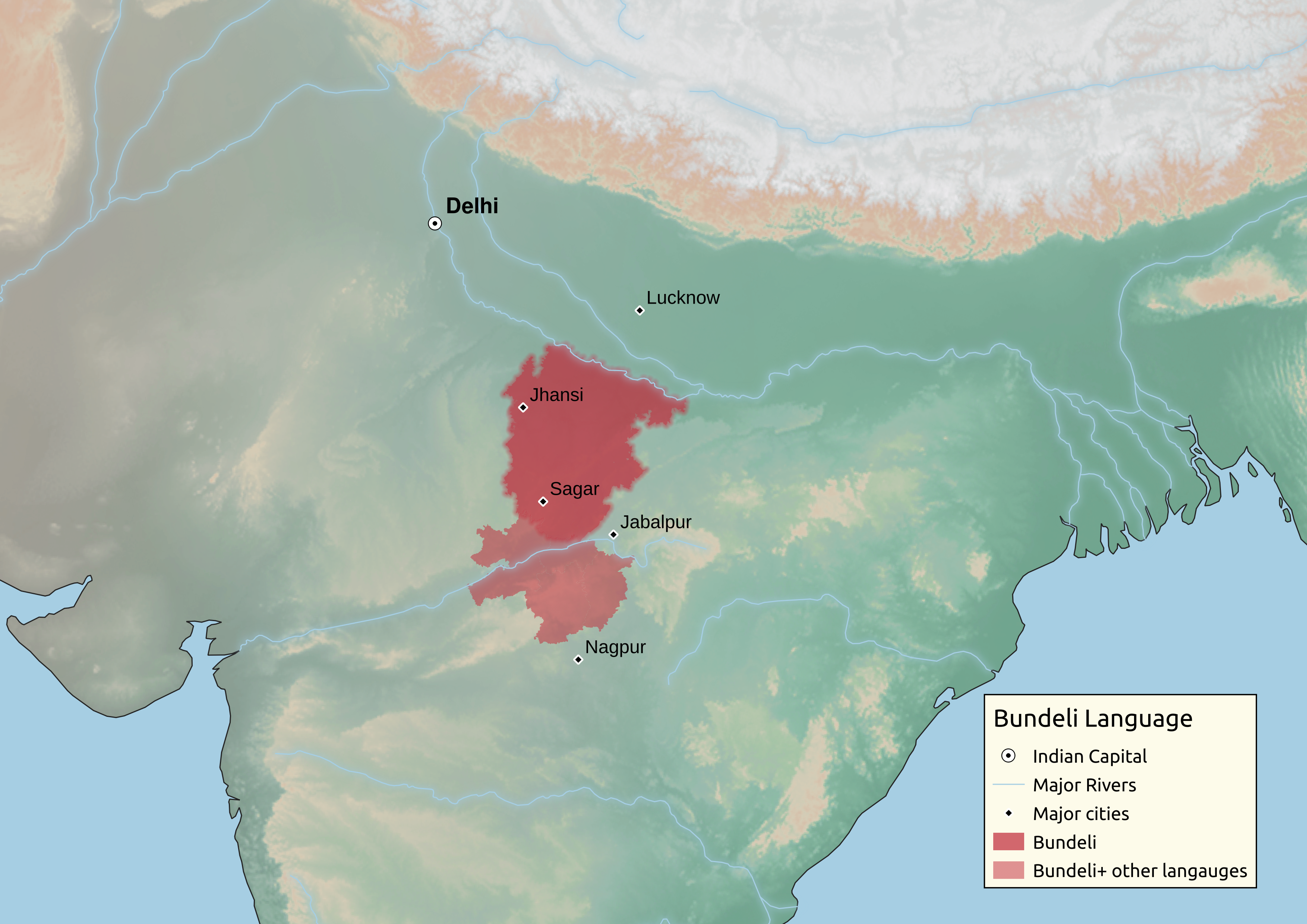

Bundeli (Devanagari: बुन्देली/बुंदेली) or Bundelkhandi is an Indo-Aryan language spoken in the Bundelkhand region of central India. It belongs to the Central Indo-Aryan languages and is part of the Western Hindi subgroup.

== Classification ==
A descendant of the Sauraseni Apabhramsha language, Bundeli was classified under Western Hindi by George Abraham Grierson in his Linguistic Survey of India. Bundeli is also closely related to Braj Bhasha, which was the foremost literary language in north-central India until the nineteenth century.

Like many other Indo-Aryan languages, Bundeli has often been subject to a designation as a dialect, instead of a language. Furthermore, as is the case with other Hindi languages, Bundeli speakers have been conflated with those of Standard Hindi in censuses.

Grierson divided Bundeli into four dialect groups:

- Standard Bundeli, Bundeli, language of Tikamgarh, Lalitpur, Mahoba etc.
- Northeastern Bundeli (closely related to Bagheli)
- Northwestern Bundeli (similar to Braj Bhasha)
- Southern Bundeli (mixed or broken Bundeli with slight influences from Marathi)

== Geographical distribution ==
The Bundelkhand region comprises regions of Uttar Pradesh and Madhya Pradesh. Bundeli is spoken in the Gwalior, Ashoknagar, Morena, Bhind, Datia, Shivpuri, Guna, Banda, Hamirpur, Jalaun, Jhansi, Lalitpur, Chitrakoot, Mahoba, Chhatarpur, Panna, Tikamgarh, Sagar, Damoh, Niwari districts.

Traditional Folk music (Lokgeet) in Bundeli

== Phonology ==
=== Consonants ===
Phonemes of Bundeli
		Labial	Dental	Alveolar	Retroflex	Palatal	Velar	Glottal
Nasal		m		n				
Plosive/ Affricate	voiceless	p	t̪	ts	ʈ		k	
Plosive/ Affricate	voiceless aspirated	pʰ	t̪ʰ	tsʰ	ʈʰ		kʰ	
Plosive/ Affricate	voiced	b	d̪	dz	ɖ		ɡ	
Plosive/ Affricate	voiced aspirated	bʱ	d̪ʱ	dzʱ	ɖʱ		ɡʱ	
Fricative				s				ɦ
Flap				ɾ				
Approximant		ʋ		l		j		

== Grammar ==
Sanskrit final, initial, and surplus medial vowels are frequently lost in ways much common to Hindi.

=== Nouns ===
Two genders – masculine and feminine – are taken by all nouns in Bundeli, indiscriminate of their animacy. Masculine nouns tend to take the a-declension, as do feminine ones, but feminine nouns exhibit more variation in termination, with a number of ī-nouns existing. Masculines also take ē- and ō- declensions "not very rarely". Masculine nouns converted to feminines take the terminations -(ā)ni, -na, -iyā.

The numbers are singular and plural alone.

=== Pronouns ===
Informal forms of address predominate among speakers of Bundelkhandi, owing to their rural location and their use of Hindi forms in formal speech. The first person pronoun is declined below in a table.

	First-person singular	First-person plural
Nom.	maī, hama	hama
Agentive	maīnē	hamanē (in ergative past tense exclusively)
Obl.	mō-	hama- (with postposition); hamārē (dat.)
Gen. and possessive	mōrō (masc. sing.), mōrē (masc. pl.), mōrī (fem.)	hamār- (declined for gender as mōr-)

== History ==
Early examples of Bundelkhandi literature are the verses of the Alha-Khand epic. It is still preserved by bards in the Banaphari region. The epic is about heroes who lived in the 12th century CE. Formal literary works in Bundeli dates from the reign of Emperor Akbar. Notable figures are the poet Kesab Das of the 16th century, while Padmakar Bhatt and Prajnes wrote several works during the 19th century. Prannath and Lal Kabi, produced many works in Bundeli language at the court of Chhatrasal of Panna.
