= Khurai =

- Municipality
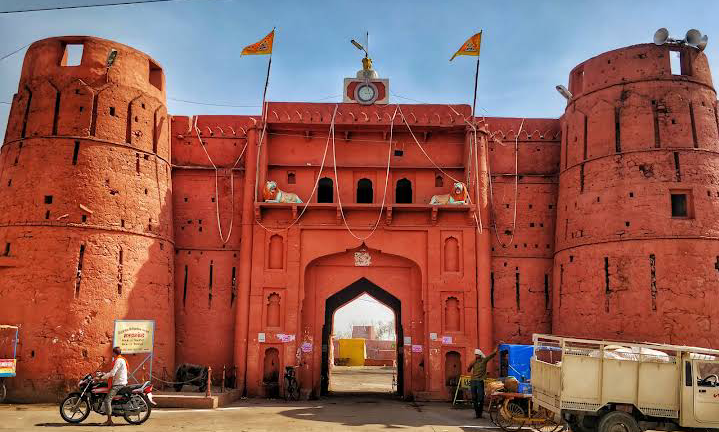
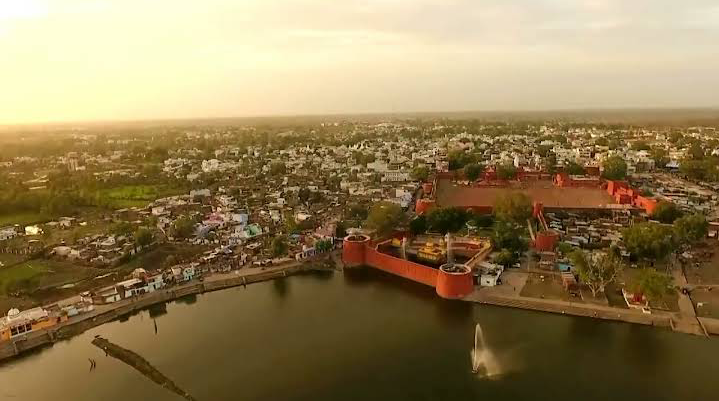
- Khurai Dohela Fort, Lake and Temple

- Location in Madhya Pradesh, India Khurai (India)
- Coordinates: 24.05°N 78.32°E
- Country: India
- State: Madhya Pradesh
- District: Sagar District
- Founded: 1893
- ratan s: Khurai

Government
  - Mayor: Dr. Subrota Das
  - Member of Legislative Assembly: Mr. Bhupendra Singh Thakur
  - Commissioner: P.S Khan

Area
  - Total: 126.77 km^{2} (48.95 sq mi)
- Elevation: 421 m (1,381 ft)

Population (2024)
  - Total: 200,000 approx.
  - Rank: 900
  - Density: 96/km^{2} (250/sq mi)

Languages
  - Official: Hindi, Bundelkhandi, Urdu, English
- Time zone: UTC+5:30 (IST)
- PIN: 470117
- Telephone code: 91-7581
- ISO 3166 code: IN-MP
- Vehicle registration: MP 15
- Coastline: 0 kilometres (0 mi)
- Nearest city: saugor, India
- Distance from Delhi: 949 kilometres (590 mi) S
- Distance from Mumbai: 1,089 kilometres (677 mi) NE
- Distance from Kolkata: 1,921 kilometres (1,194 mi) W
- Distance from Chennai: 2,418 kilometres (1,502 mi) N
- Climate: AW (Köppen)
- Precipitation: 231 millimetres (9.1 in)
- Avg. annual temperature: 24.03 °C (75.25 °F)
- Avg. summer temperature: 42.33 °C (108.19 °F)
- Avg. winter temperature: 01.77 °C (35.19 °F)

Khurai is a major city in Sagar District and a municipality in the Indian state of Madhya Pradesh. It's a tehsil headquarter and an Assembly constituency in Madhya Pradesh.

== Geography ==
Khurai is located on 24.05°N 78.32°E. It has an average elevation of 508 metres (1669 feet). It is located in the northeastern region of Madhya Pradesh.

== Climate ==
Khurai has a mainly moderate climate. From October to February the temperature is between 12 °C (54 °F) to 27 °C (81 °F); from March to June temperatures range from 35 °C (95 °F) to 48 °C (118 °F). The average rainfall is about 200 cm (79 in). Winters are moderately cool and summers are hot. Monsoon season lasts from June through August.

Khurai

Climate chart (precipitation, max. and min. temperature)
J	F	M	A	M	J	J	A	S	O	N	D
1.2 19 1	1.3 30 10	3 37 21	9 41 24	38 45 25	53 48 24	123 33 21	181 27 21	31 25 17	2.2 24 12	6.1 21 4	0.1 16 2
- █ Average max. and min. temperatures in °C
- █ Precipitation totals in mm
- Source: World Weather Information Service
Imperial conversion
J	F	M	A	M	J	J	A	S	O	N	D
0 65 34	0.1 86 50	0.1 99 70	0.4 105 75	1.5 114 77	2.1 118 75	4.8 92 70	7.1 81 69	1.2 77 63	0.1 75 54	0.2 69 39	0 62 36
- █ Average max. and min. temperatures in °F
- █ Precipitation totals in inches

== Demographics ==
As of the 2024 census of India, Khurai has a population of 2,00,000 approx. Males constitute 53% of the population and females 47%. Khurai has an average literacy rate of 85.8%, higher than the national average of 80.1%.

Religions in Khurai City
Religion	Percent
Hindus	83.29%
Muslims	9.56%
Jains	4.87%
Sikhs	1.57%
Others†	1.4%
Distribution of religions †Includes Christians (0.56%), Buddhists (<0.7%).

Religions in KHURAI (Dehat)
Religion	Percent
Hindus	97%
Muslims	0.9%
Christians	0%
Jains	0%
Others†	2.1%
Distribution of religions †Includes Sikhs (0.2%), Buddhists (<0.2%).

== Economy ==
The main business in the Khurai region is agriculture. The main crops grown there are wheat (sharbati), soybean and gram. The city is a hub for the manufacturing of agricultural equipment such as threshers, cultivators, ploughs, seed drills and trollies.

A hospital, round-the-clock mobile medical vehicle, a national level auditorium, badminton court and gym have been set up in the area by the state government.

== Places to Interest ==
- Dohela Fort: Dohela fort is main attraction of Khurai town, it's a historical and beautiful fort, every year here celebrating a Dohela fair.
- Radha Kund and Temple: This temple and lake is other major interesting place in khurai, that's temple is very old and divine. Many people are visiting them every day.
- Laal Jain Mandir: Laal Jain Mandir is an important religious and philosophical place of Khurai, here Jain Temple and Maansthambh fascinating place, along with this Dharamshala is also available here.

== Education and Institution ==
There are many colleges and institutes available in the field of education in Khurai, the major ones are

- Govt Degree College, Khurai
- Atal Bihari Vajpeyi Agriculture College, Khurai
- Politecnic College, Khurai
- RLM College, Khurai

== Localities and suburbs ==
- Ghourat
- Jagdishpura
- Jarwaans

== Transportation ==
Khurai is well connected with roads and railways,

- Road: Sagar is 40 km away from Khurai.National Highway 934 and State Highway 14 passing through khurai, khurai is connected nearby towns with daily bus services.
- Rail way: Khurai railway station located on Bina Katni Line. Its code is KYE. It serves Khurai city. The station consists of three platforms. Passenger, Express and Superfast trains halt here.

== See also ==
- Bandri
