= State Highway 30 (Madhya Pradesh) =

State highway in Madhya Pradesh, India

State Highway 30

Route information
- Length: 111 km (69 mi)

Major junctions
- East end: Gyaraspur near NH 146
- Haidargarh Basoda, Begamganj, Sultanganj, Searmau, Tada, Kesli
- West end: Gaurjhamar near NH 44

Location
- Country: India
- State: Madhya Pradesh

Highway system
- Roads in India; Expressways; National; State; Asian; State Highways in Madhya Pradesh

Madhya Pradesh State Highway 30 (MP SH 30) is a State Highway running from Gyaraspur via Basoda, Begamganj, Tada, Kesli till Gourjhamar town.

It connects the districts of Vidisha, Raisen, Sagar of Madhya Pradesh covering a total distance of 111 kilometers.

== Route ==
This highway is connected to Vidisha, Raisen and Sagar District Towns. That's

Gyaraspur-Haidargarh Basoda-Begamganj-Sultanganj-Searmau-Tada-Kesli-Gaurjhamar

== See also ==
- List of state highways in Madhya Pradesh
