= Bankori =

Village in Madhya Pradesh, India

- Village
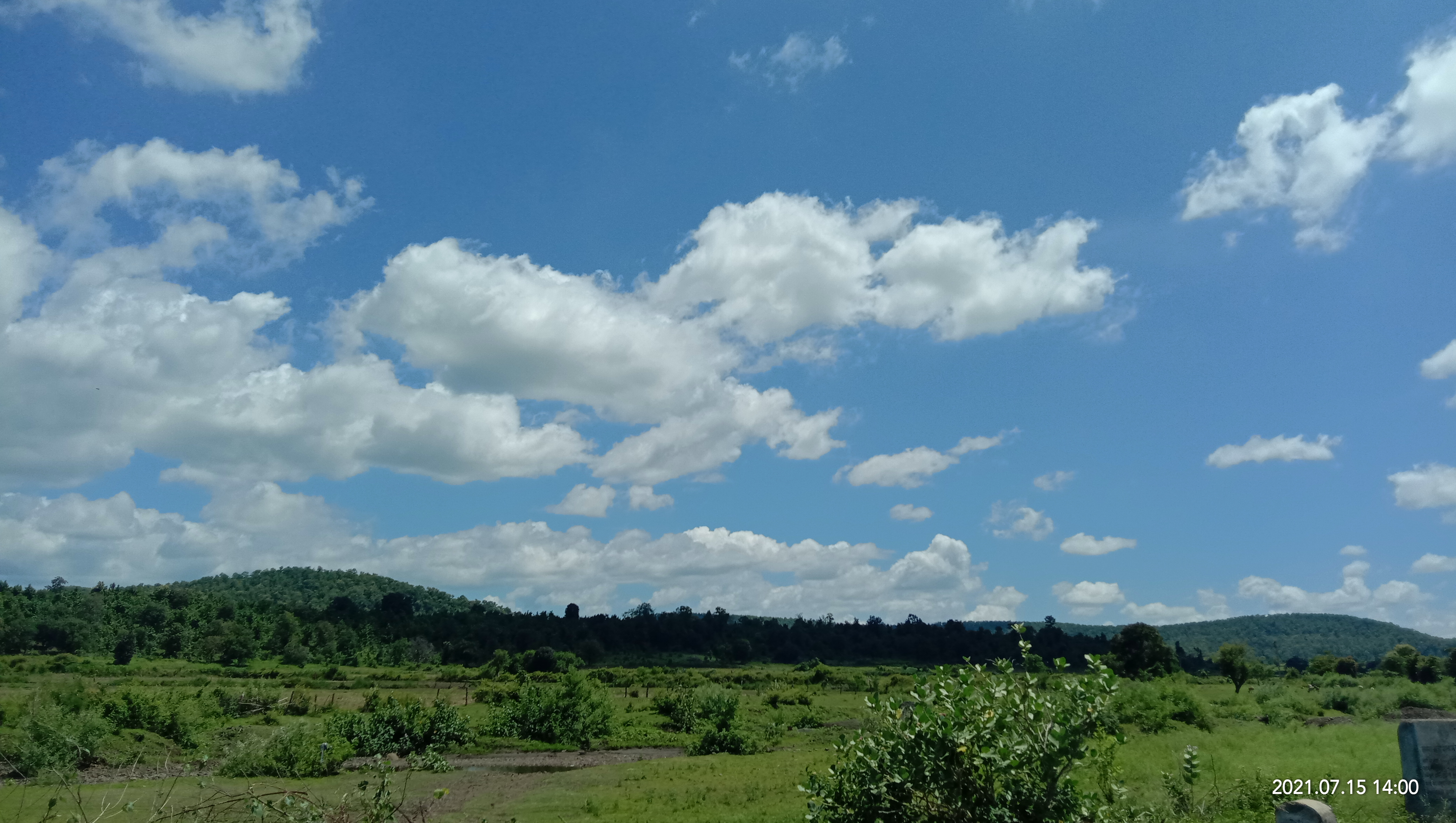
- Bankori hills

- Location in Madhya Pradesh, India Bankori (India)
- Coordinates: 23.38°N 78.77°E
- Country: India
- State: Madhya Pradesh
- Division: Sagar
- District: Sagar
- Tehsil: Kesli

Government
  - Body: Gram panchyat

Population (2011)
  - Total: 948

Languages
  - Official: Hindi
- Time zone: UTC+5:30 (IST)
- Postal code: 470235
- ISO 3166 code: IN-MP
- Vehicle registration: MP-15

Bankori (Village ID 461281) is a village in Kesli tehsil of Sagar district of Madhya Pradesh in India. As of 2011, Bankori had a population of 239 families or 948 people.

According to Census 2011 information the location code or village code of Bankori village is 461281. Bankori village is located in Kesli tehsil of Sagar district in Madhya Pradesh, India. It is situated 8 km away from sub-district headquarter Kesli (tehsildar office) and 69 km away from district headquarter Sagar. As per 2009 stats, Bankori is the gram panchayat of Bankori village.

== Geography ==
Bankori village located on 23.38°N 78.77°E. It has an average elevation of 508 metres (1669 feet). It is located near Vindhyachal Range and surrounded by mountains. Sunar River passing from here. here is many historical Monument.

== Demographics ==
Bankori is a medium size village located in Kesli Tehsil of Sagar district, Madhya Pradesh with total 239 families residing. The Bankori village has population of 948 of which 509 are males while 439 are females as per Population Census 2011.

== Connectivity ==
Bankori is well connected with roads. Nearby city from bankori is Sagar, Jabalpur, Bhopal, Damoh, Katni ets.

== Gallery ==
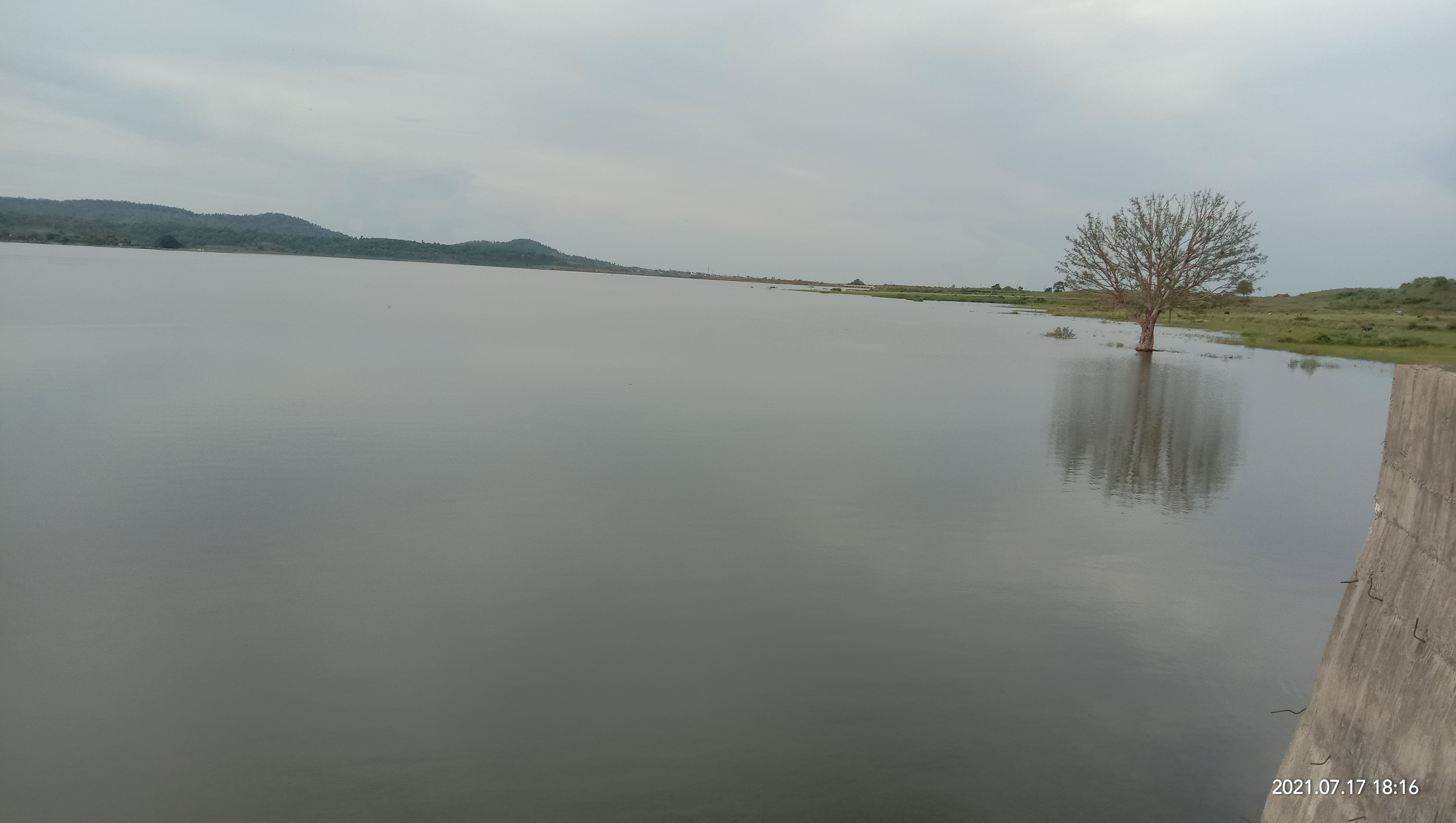
Sunar River

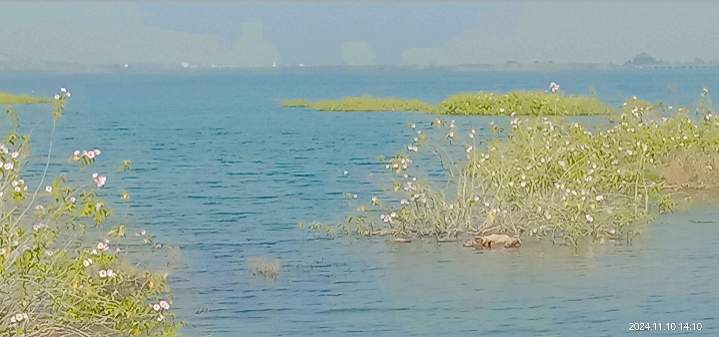
Kesli reservoir near bankori

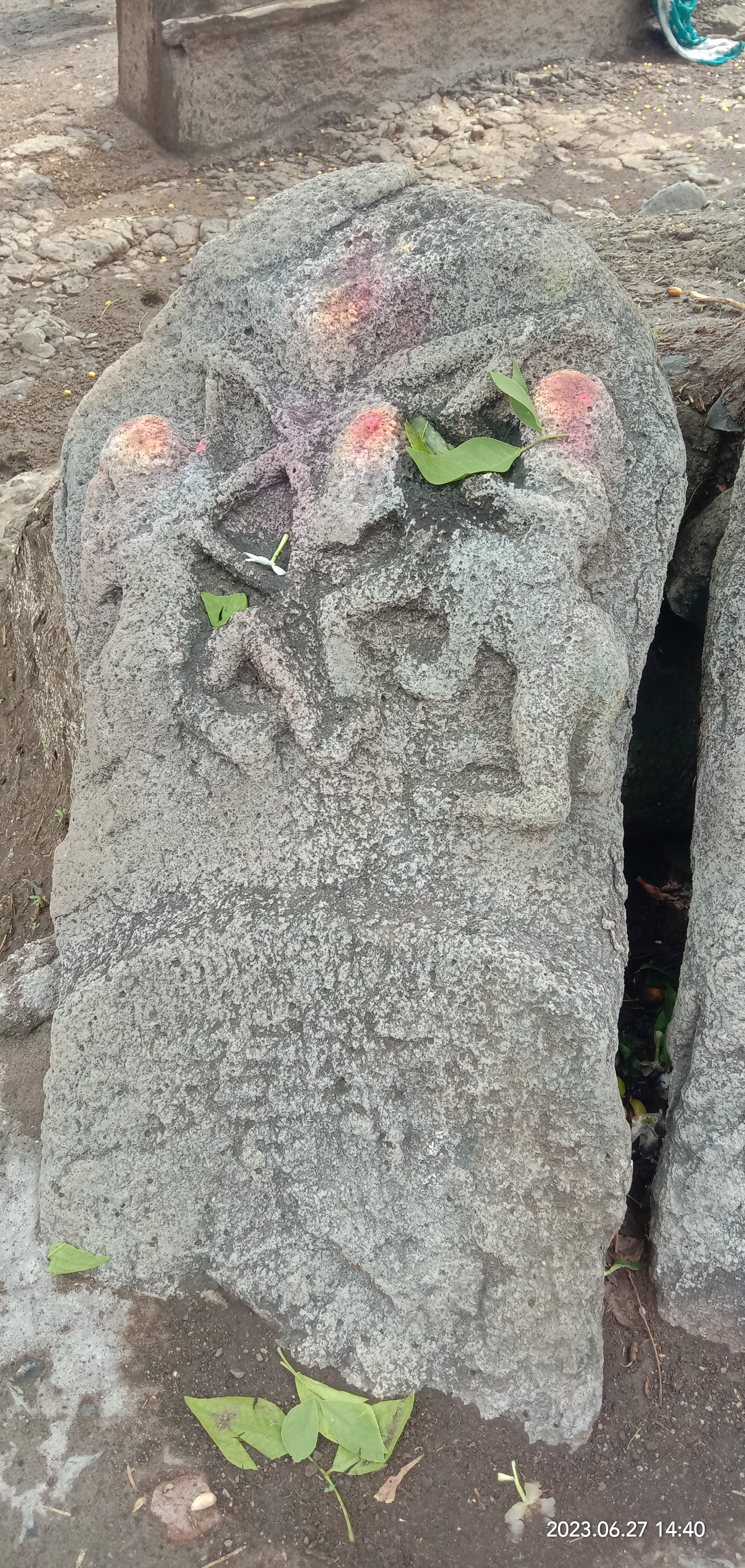
Etihasik patthar

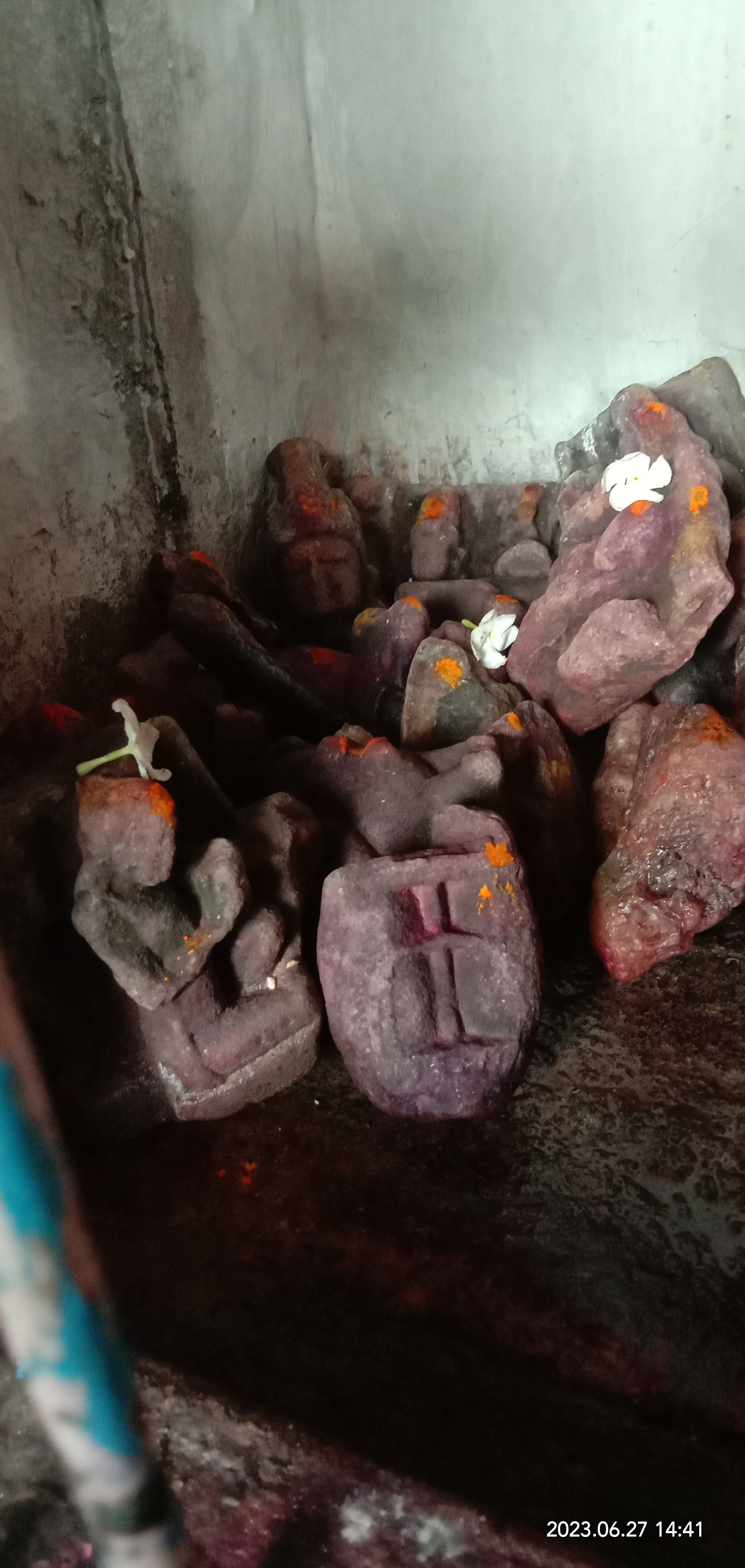
Etihasik murtiyan

== See also ==
1. Kesli
2. Sagar District
3. Sunar River
4. Tada
5. Deori Assembly constituency
