= Nariaoli railway station =

Railway station in Madhya Pradesh

Nariaoli

General information
- Location: National Highway 26A, Badora, Sagar district, Madhya Pradesh; India
- Coordinates: 23°53′44″N 78°36′15″E
- Elevation: 498 metres (1,634 ft)
- System: Indian Railways station
- Owner: Indian Railways
- Operator: West Central Railway
- Line: Bina–Katni line
- Platforms: 4
- Tracks: Triple Electric-Line

Construction
- Structure type: Standard (on ground)
- Parking: Yes

Other information
- Status: Functioning
- Station code: NOI
- Zone(s): West Central Railway
- Division(s): Jabalpur

Services
Preceding station	Indian Railways	Following station
Isarwara towards ?	West Central Railway zone Bina–Katni line	Ratona towards ?
Location
- Location within Madhya Pradesh Location within India
- Interactive map

Nariaoli railway station is a railway station in located on Bina–Katni railway line operated by the West Central Railway under Jabalpur railway division. It is situated beside National Highway 26A at Badora in Sagar district in the Indian state of Madhya Pradesh.

== History ==
Katni Bina line was established in 1923. It was started with a single track which was later converted to double track in 1982. It got electrified during 1994–95.
