= Jaruakheda =

Town in Madhya Pradesh, India

- Town
- Location in Madhya Pradesh, India
- Coordinates: 23.83°N 78.80°E

Jaruwakheda is a town in Sagar district of Madhya Pradesh, India. It is located on the NH 934 35 km from Sagar.

Jeruwa Khera railway station is a small railway station in Bina Katni line.The station consists of two platforms. Passenger and Express trains halt here.

Jaruakheda is located at 23.97°N 78.48°E. As per the 2011 Census, Jaruwakheda town had a population of 6521 of which 3409 were males while 3112 were females with a total of 1466 families residing.
