= Dr. Bhimrao Ambedkar Wildlife Sanctuary =

Wildlife sanctuary in Sagar district, Madhya Pradesh, India

- डा. भीमराव अंबेडकर वन्यजीव अभयारण्य
- Location within Madhya Pradesh
- Location: Sagar district, Madhya Pradesh, India
- Nearest city: Banda, Shahgarh
- Coordinates: 24.18079°N 79.04712°E
- Area: 258.64 km^{2} (99.86 sq mi)
- Established: 2025
- Governing body: Madhya Pradesh Forest Department

Dr. Bhimrao Ambedkar Wildlife Sanctuary is a wildlife sanctuary located in the Sagar district of Madhya Pradesh, India. It was established in April 2025 and covers 258.64 km^{2} under the North Sagar Forest Division, including the tehsils of Banda and Shahgarh.

== History ==
The sanctuary was created in April 2025 as Madhya Pradesh's 25th wildlife sanctuary and named after Dr. B. R. Ambedkar.

Management of the sanctuary is carried out by the Madhya Pradesh Forest Department through the North Sagar Forest Division, which is responsible for patrolling, habitat conservation and enforcement.

== Geography and fauna ==
The sanctuary lies in northern Sagar district, comprising dry deciduous forest, scrubland, and grassland landscapes typical of central India. It is positioned between the Vindhyan plateau and adjoining plains.

The region hosts species such as Chinkara, Nilgai, jackal, striped hyena, reptiles, and numerous bird species.

== See also ==
- Tokalo Wildlife Sanctuary
