= Deori Kalan =

Deori Kalan Devpuri
- City
- Deori Kalan
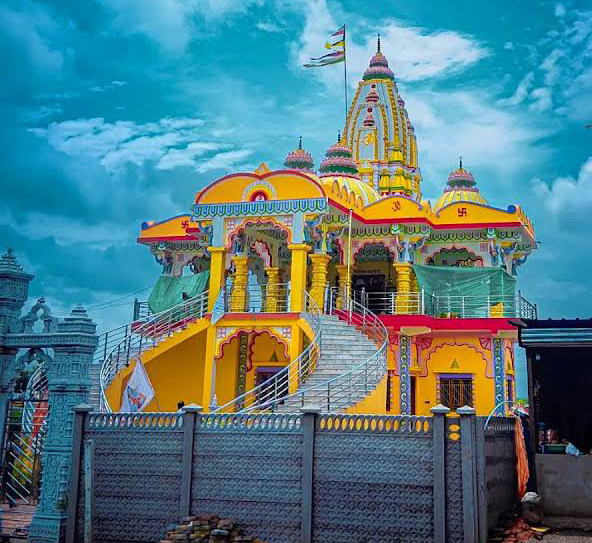
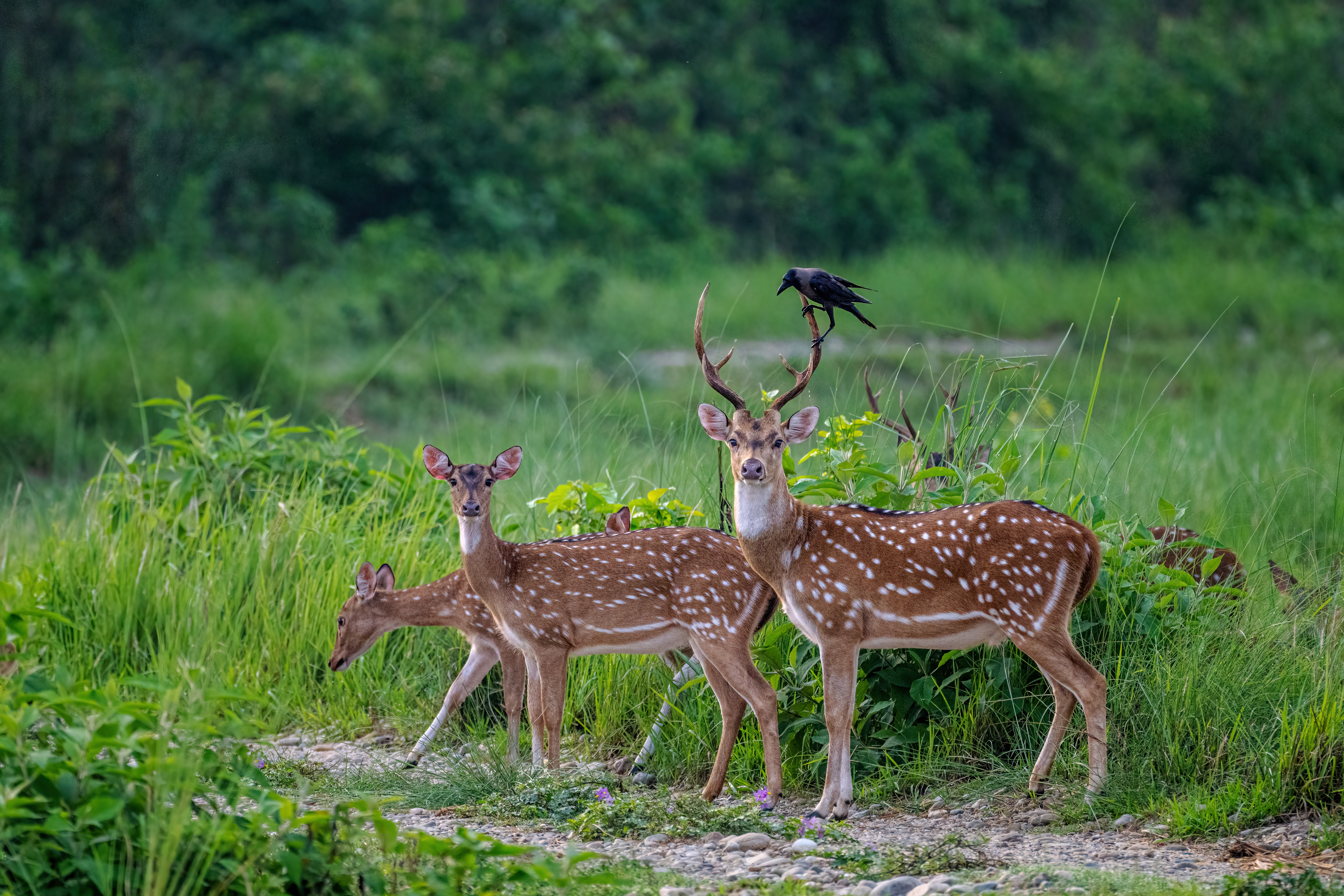
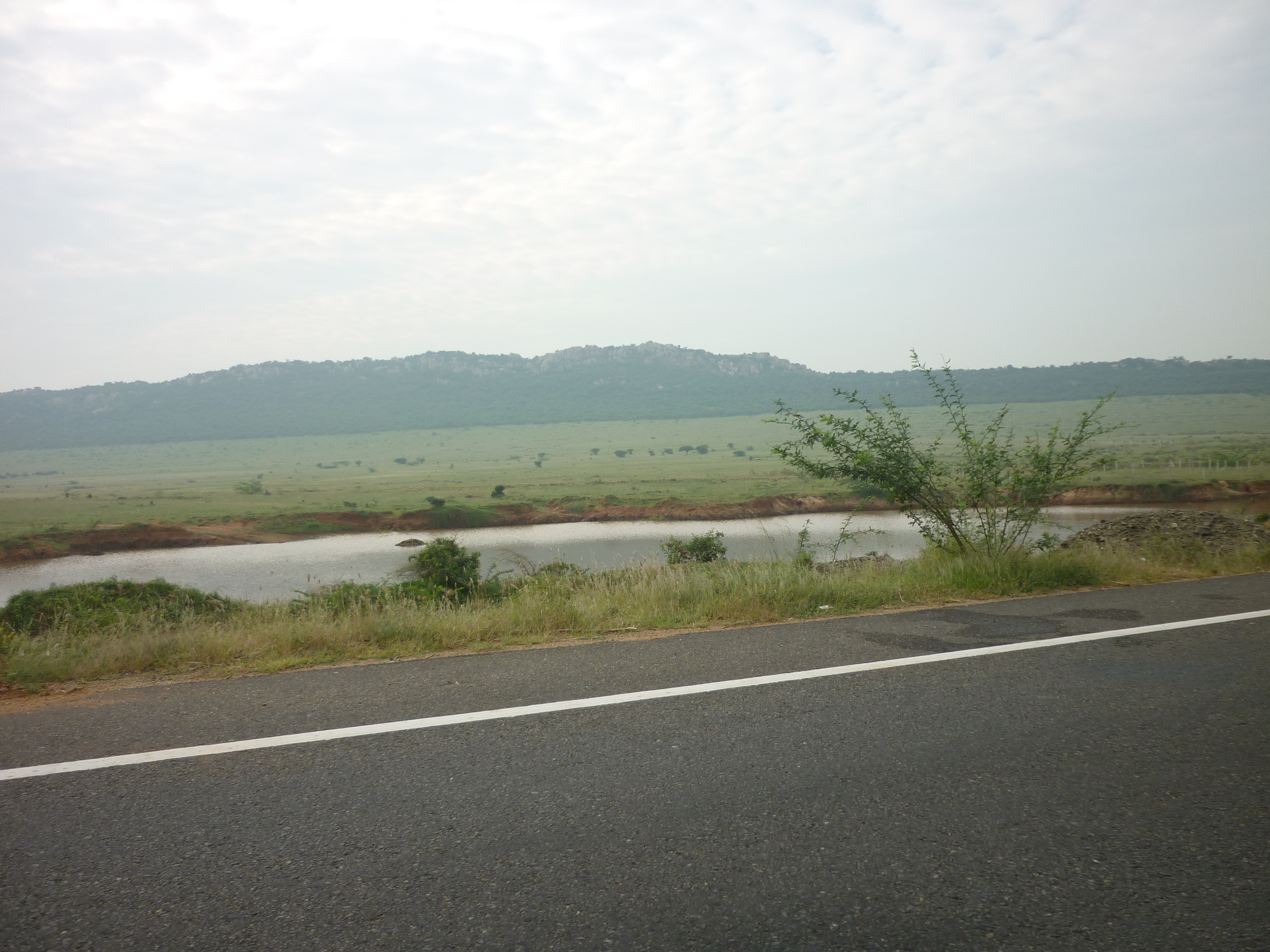
- Shiv Temple in Deori Nauradehi NH 44

- Location in Madhya Pradesh, India Deori Kalan (India)
- Coordinates: 23.40°N 79.02°E
- Country: India
- State: Madhya Pradesh
- District: Sagar
- Elevation: 360 m (1,180 ft)

Population (2021)
  - Total: 30,000

Languages
  - Official: Hindi
- Time zone: UTC+5:30 (IST)
- Postal code: 470226
- ISO 3166 code: IN-MP
- Vehicle registration: MP-15

Deori Kalan is a historic city located on the banks of the Sukhchain River, along the Narsinghpur–Sagar road. It is a 150-year-old municipality situated in the Sagar district of Madhya Pradesh, India.

== Geography ==
Deori is located at 21.40°N 79.02°E. It has an average elevation of 360 metres (1,181 feet).

== Demographics ==
As per the 2011 Census of India, Deori had a population of 25,632. Males constituted 52% of the population, while females made up 48%. The town recorded an average literacy rate of 70%, which is higher than the national average of 59.5%. Male literacy stood at 77%, and female literacy at 63%. Approximately 15% of the population was below 6 years of age.

== History ==
Deori is a historic city in the Sagar district of Madhya Pradesh, India. It holds the status of a tehsil. The population of Deori is approximately 50,000.

In the 17th century, King Gond founded the city, which was originally known as Ramgarh or Ujargarh. Subsequently, a temple was constructed at the site, and the city was renamed "Deori", meaning "Abode of God".

The city is historically known as "Panch Mahlon Ki Rajdhani". An ancient fort is located at the centre of the city. Additionally, the city is home to its oldest temple, which is surrounded by several historical structures.

Deori city played a significant role during the Indian independence movement and was once visited by Mahatma Gandhi.

== Places of interest ==
- Nauradehi: The Nauradehi Sanctuary, located near Deori, spans an area of approximately 103.62 square kilometres. The sanctuary is home to various wildlife species, including sambar, chital, blackbuck, and nilgai. Nearby is the Gopalpura forest, renowned for its teak (sagon) and tendu trees, and commonly referred to as the 'Sagon' (Teak) and 'Tendu' Forest.
- Deori Fort: The Deori Fort is believed to have been originally built by a Chandela Raja and later rebuilt by Durga Singh, the Gond ruler of Gourjhamar. Deori was a prosperous settlement until around 1813 AD, when a massive fire caused its depopulation, and the town never regained its former glory.
- Amritjhiriya Paramhans Aashram: The Amritjhiriya Paramhans Ashram is a serene and natural retreat, known for its peaceful environment. The site also features several temples and ashrams, making it a place of spiritual significance.

== Civic administration ==
Deori is represented in the Madhya Pradesh Legislative Assembly through the Deori (Vidhan Sabha constituency). As of 2023, the constituency is represented by Brijbihari Pateriya of the Bhartiya Janata Party (BJP).

== Notable people ==
- Brijbihari Pateriya - Indian Politician
- Nathuram Premi (1881–1960) – writer, publisher, poet, editor
- Harsh Yadav – Indian politician

== Temples ==
Deori city is home to numerous ancient and modern temples of historical and religious significance.

- Khanderao Temple: This is an ancient temple where a fair is held during Champa Chhat. A notable ritual during the festival involves devotees walking on fire.
- Beena Barha Jain Temples: The Jain temples of Beena Barha, located in the rural area of Garhpipariya near Deori, are an Atishay Jain Tirth. Renowned Jain monk Acharya Vidyasagar has visited these temples multiple times for Chaturmas, inspiring the local community during various religious events organised in the city.
- Chausath Yogini Mandir: The Chausath Yogini Temple, located in Panari village, is a sacred site dedicated to the 64 forms of Goddess Durga. Additionally, the temple complex is home to the largest banyan tree in Madhya Pradesh.
- Sankatmochan Hanuman Mandir: This temple, approximately 100 years old, is dedicated to Lord Hanuman and is a significant place of worship in Deori.
- Mahakali Math: A revered religious site dedicated to Goddess Mahakali, known for its spiritual and cultural importance in the region.
- Kherapati Math: A revered religious site dedicated to Goddess Maa Kher Mai, known for its spiritual and cultural importance in the region.

== Colleges ==
Government Nehru College

Government Nehru College was originally established as a non-government institution by Shri Dwarka Prasad Katare in 1964 to provide higher education. It was later converted into a government college on August 1, 1973. On September 1, 1975, Swami Vivekanand College was merged into it. The college is currently located on the bypass road near the new police station.

The construction of the college building was funded by the government and the University Grants Commission. The college shifted to its new building in March 1989. The college campus spans approximately 8 acres (32,000 m²), which includes the main building, playground, and garden. In the 1996–97 academic session, the college was granted the status of a Post Graduate College. The library is situated on the first floor of the college building.

BKP College

BKP College is a private institution offering higher education.

Government ITI

The Government ITI provides vocational training and skill development opportunities in Deori.

== Transportation ==
Deori is well-connected by road, with NH 44 passing through the city. Daily buses operate from Deori, linking it to Sagar, Damoh, Bhopal, Jabalpur, Nagpur, Narsinghpur, Seoni, Balaghat, Rehli, Gadarwara, and other nearby locations.

== See also ==
- kesli
- Gaurjhamar
- Bankori
