= Sumreri =

Village in Madhya Pradesh, India

Coordinates: 24°01′N 78°25′E

Sumreri is a locality in Sagar district, Madhya Pradesh in central India. It is 8 kilometres (5.0 mi) southeast of main city Khurai.

The railway station of Sumreri is known as Sumreri railway station which halts local and passenger trains running on the Bina–Katni rail route.
