= Ratona =

Coordinates: 23°49′N 78°40′E

Ratona is a town in Sagar district of Madhya Pradesh, India. There is a railway station named Ratona railway station situated on Bina–Katni line under Jabalpur railway division.
