= Sunar River =

River in (Madhya Pradesh) India

Sunar River Sunar River
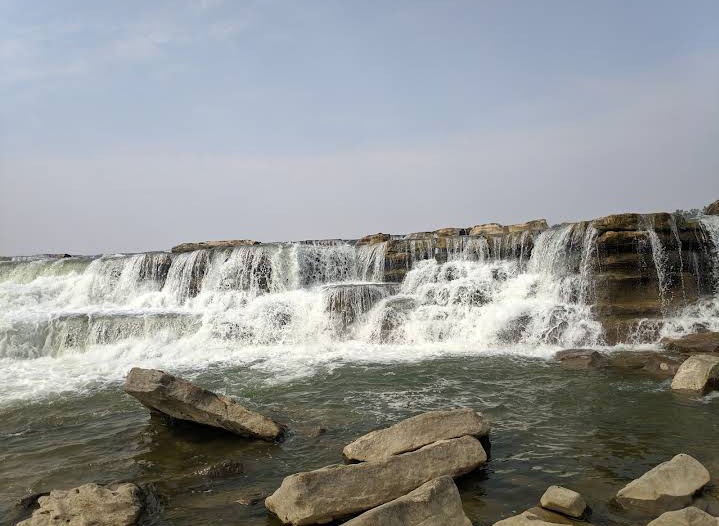
- Water Fall on Sunar River in Damoh District

- Indian River Map

Location
- Country: India
- State: Madhya Pradesh
- Cities: Rehli, Garhakota, Patharia, Hatta

Physical characteristics
- Source: Vindhya Range
  - location: Tada Village, Kesli Tehsil, Sagar district
  - elevation: 358 m
- Mouth: Ken River
  - location: Patan Kalan, Panna District
  - coordinates: 24°23′20″N 79°55′48″E
- Length: 250 km (160 mi)
- Basin size: 12,620 km2,

Basin features
- Tributaries
  - right: Dehaar, Gadheri, Bewas, Kopra, Judi, Vyarma.

The River Sunar (also called Sonar) is a rain-fed river in the Indian state of Madhya Pradesh. Sunar river flows From Sagar district, through Damoh District and Panna district.

Sunar River is a tributary of Ken River.

== Geography ==
The Sunar flows in the Bundelkhand region in Sagar District and Damoh district. This 250-km long river flows south to north like all Vindhyan rivers and the Ganges system tributaries of central Indian rivers. It drains approximately 12,000 square kilometre of the southern boundary of Bundelkhand.

== Sources ==
Sunar River originates in Sagar District from a small hilly region in Kesli block. Its initial source is near Tada village, around 80 kilometers from Sagar District.

== Tributaries ==
There are many small tributaries of the Sunar. The most notable are the Dehaar, Bewas, Judi, Gadheri, Kopra and Byarma rivers.

=== Vyarma River ===
It is a major tributary of Sunar river. It originates in Sagar district and flows in Damoh district. Bamner and Gauraiya are tributary of Byarma river. It's Passing through Nauradehi Wildlife Sanctuary and tiger reserve. The Vyarma River originates from the Johri Toria Hills in the Rahli Tehsil of Sagar District and flows north-eastwards and joins the Sunar River near Khamargaur Village in the Hata Tehsil.

=== Bewas River ===
Bewas river originates in Raisen district. It flows in Sagar district and joins Sunar river in Damoh district. Rajghat dam and Pagara dam are on the Bewas river.

=== Dehaar River ===
Dehaar is a tributary of Sunar river. It originates on the Sagar-Raisen border. Naharmau and Rangir are situated on banks of Dehaar river. It joins the Sunar river at Rahli.

=== Kopra River ===
Kopra river originates in Sagar district. It flows in Damoh district. Madhkoleshwar temple is located on Kopra and Sunar river banks.

=== Gadheri River ===
Gadheri river originates in Sagar district. Famous Aabchand Caves are located on the banks of Gadheri river. It joins Sunar river in Garhakota.

== Settlements ==
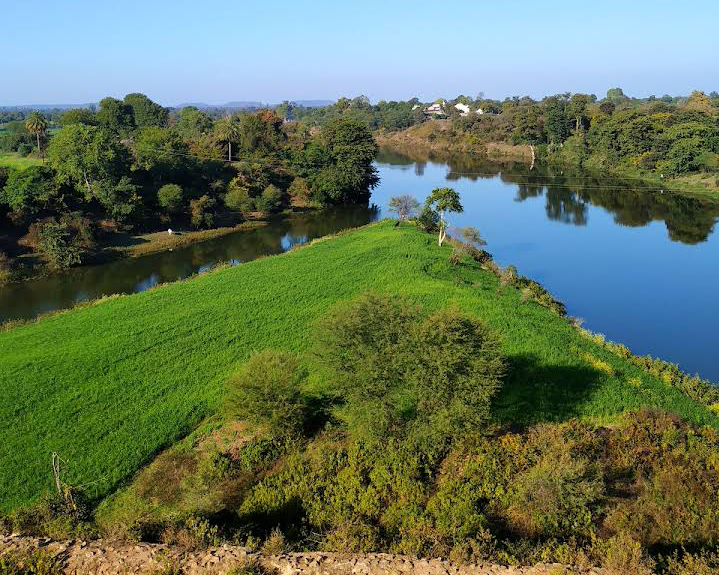
Sunar River Near Garhakota

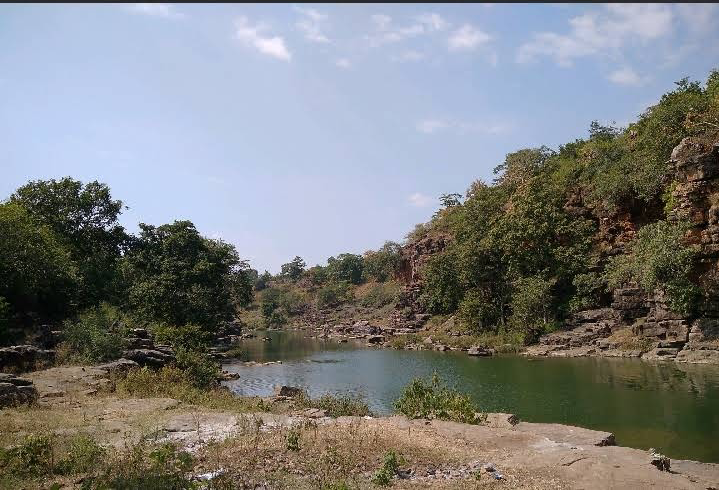
Sunar River Near Rehli

Villages and towns situated on the banks of the Sunar are Tada, Bankori, Kesli, Gaurjhamar, Gadhakota, Hatta, Patharia, Rehhli, Madiyadoh, Narsinghgarh.

== Tourist places ==
- Atal Setu (Rehli)
- Sun Temple (Rehli)
- Narsinggarh fort (Narsinggarh)
- Garhakota Fort
- Bhadbhada waterfall (Narsinggarh)
- Madhkoleshwar Temple
- Pancham Nagar Dam
