= Isarwara =

Isarwara or Isurwara (Village ID 460845) is a town in Sagar district of Madhya Pradesh, India.

Isarwara railway station is situated on the Bina–Katni line. The station lies approximately 3.5 kilometers from the village of Ishurwara (also known as Isarwara or Isurwara)

While the name might suggest direct proximity, the station was strategically located in Kishanpura to serve not only Ishurwara but also several surrounding villages. In the mid early of 19th century, railways were rapidly expanding across Central India under the Great Indian Peninsula Railway network, but remote areas like Ishurwara still lacked direct access to rail transport.
