= Garhpehra =

Village in Madhya Pradesh, India

Garhpehra Garhpehra
- Village/Fort
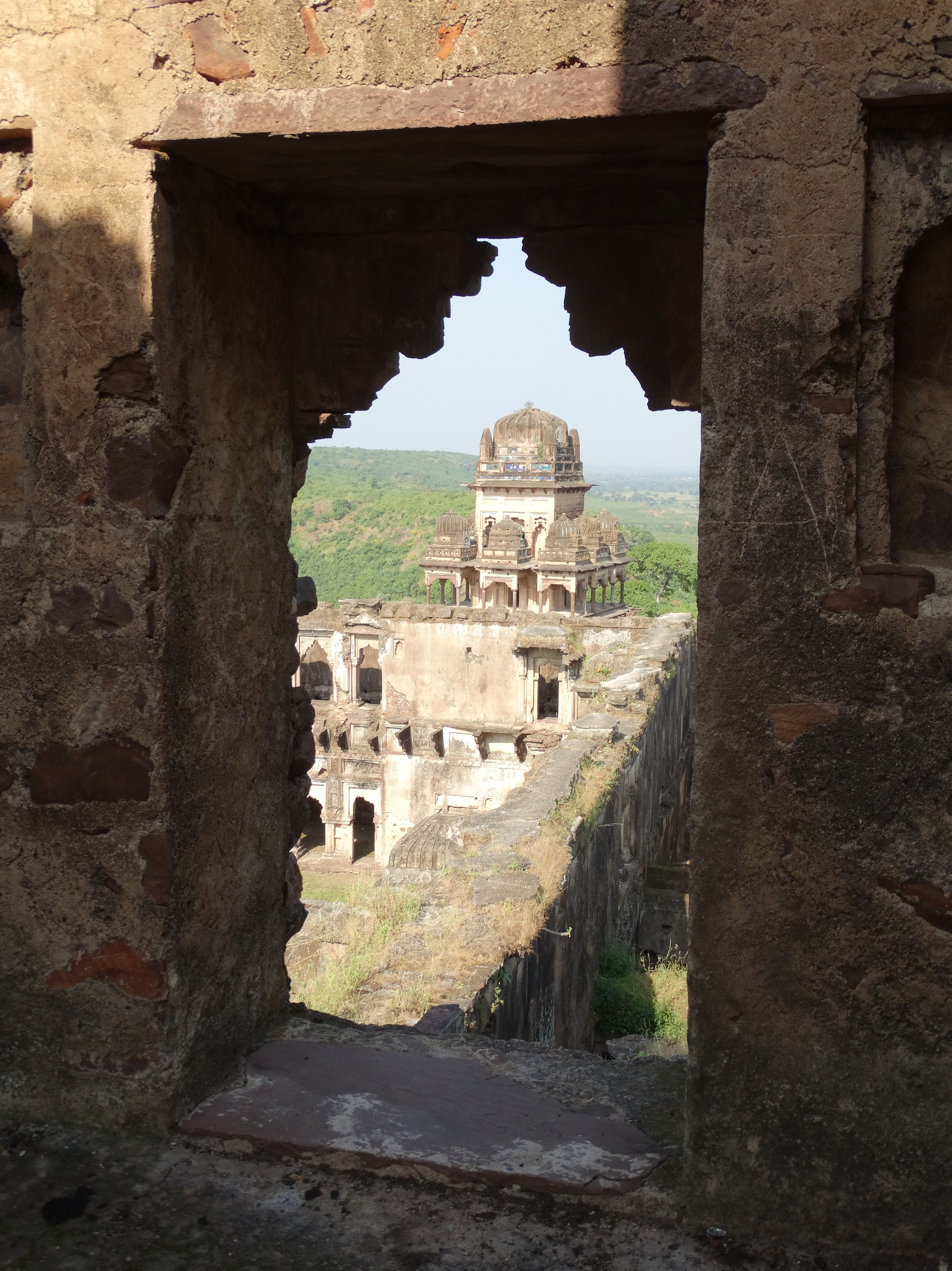

- Location within Madhya Pradesh Location within India
- Coordinates: 23°54′55″N 78°43′50″E
- Country: India
- State: Madhya Pradesh
- District: Sagar

Garhpehra is a village in Sagar District in the Indian state of Madhya Pradesh. There is a fort called Garhpehra Fort.

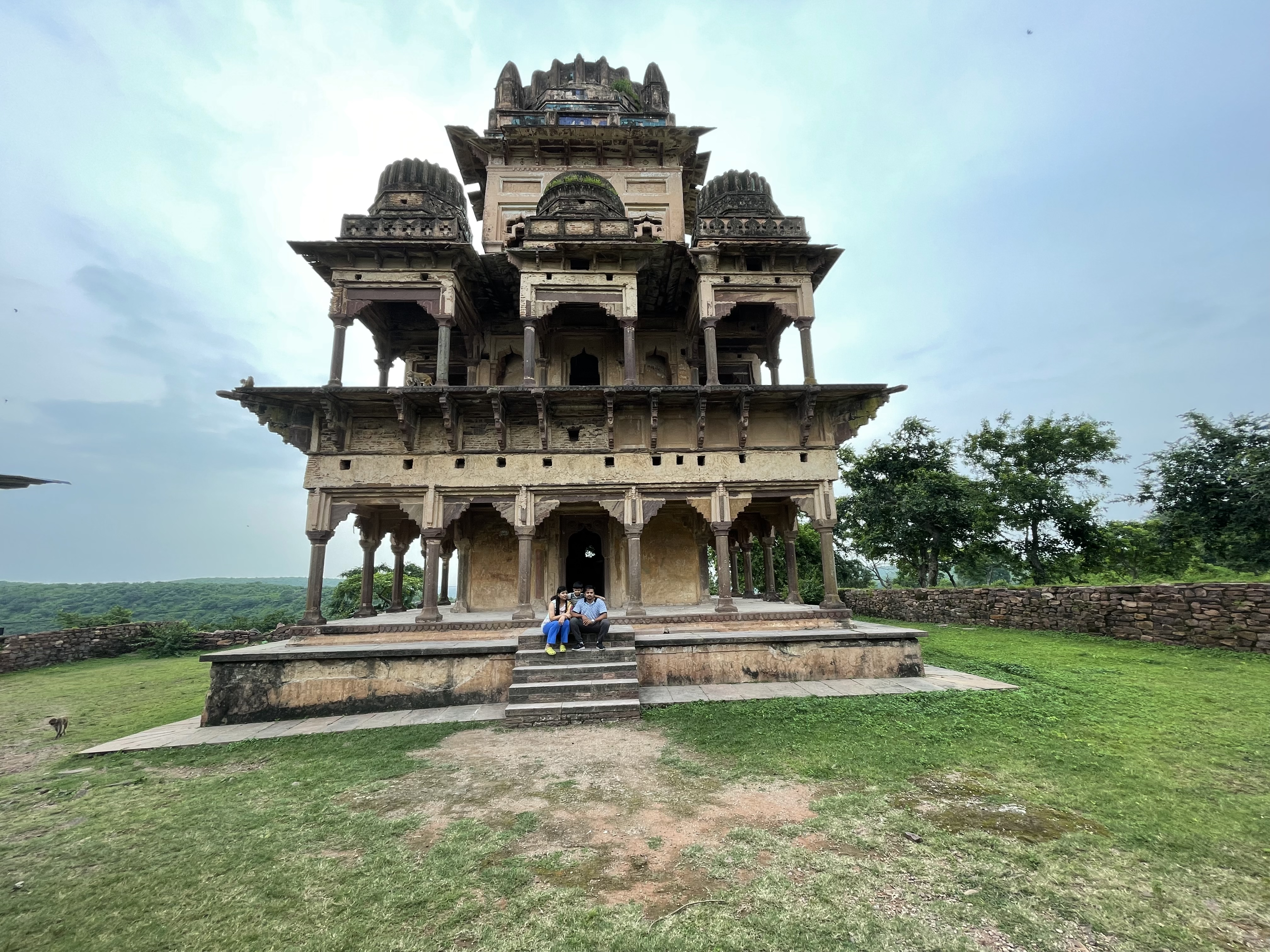
Sheesh Mahal Garhpehra Sagar

Garhpahra is also called Purana Sagar which was the capital of Gondwana state. It is considered as one of the prominent forts of garh mandala and was built by sangram shah. It is situated about 10 km from Sagar.

== History ==
Sangram shah Singh sacrificed 7 horses and established Garhpahra fort, which had 360 mouzas. Nihal Singh, Legal Dev, and Uday Shah were its rulers. The inscription of 1747 is present of Maharajkumar Singh .

== Fort and Temple ==
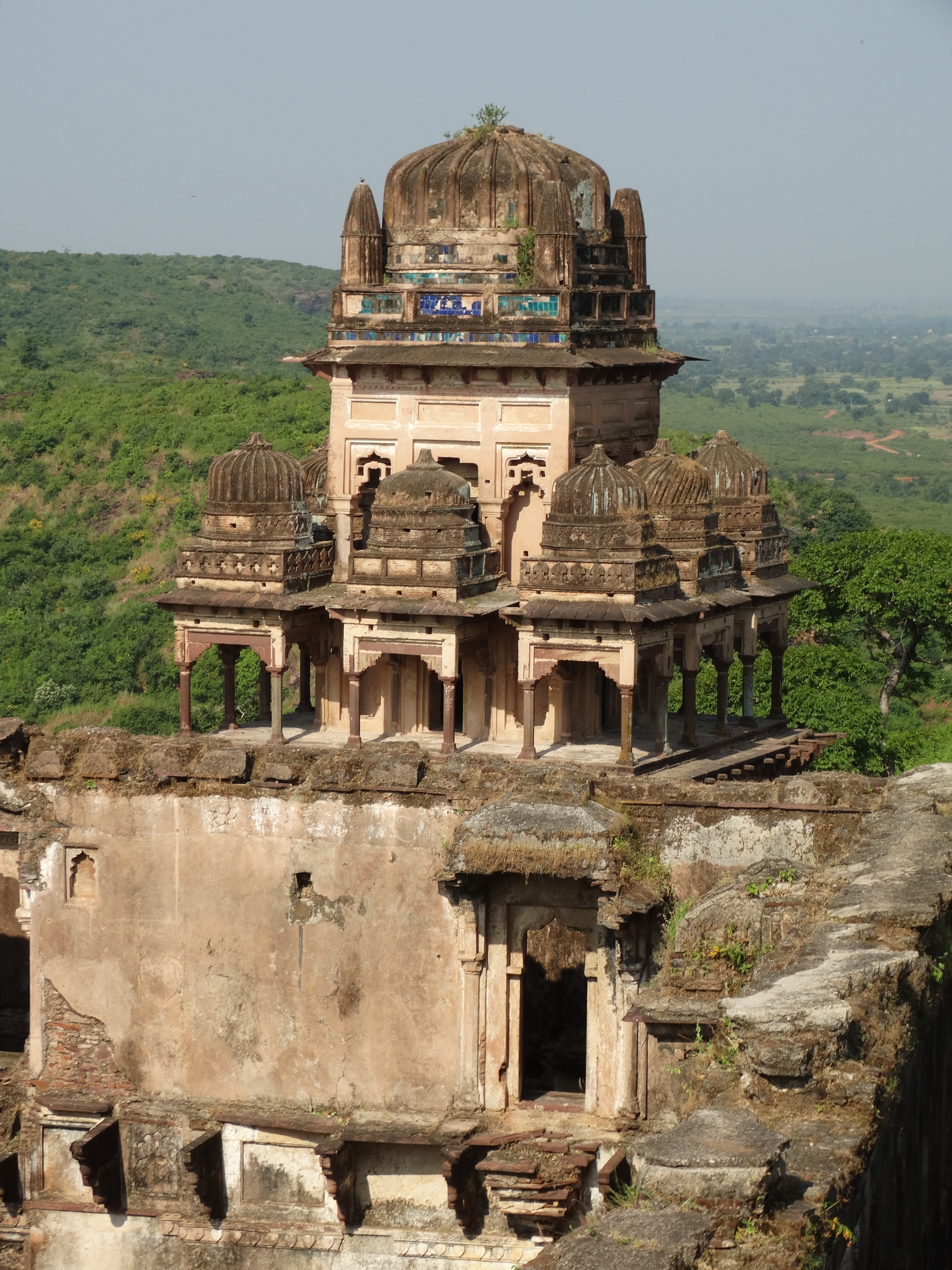
Old_remains_-_Garh_Pehra

Even today the remains of the fort are present here, a palace by the name of Sheesh Mahal is also situated here, beautiful carved walls, doors and rooms can be seen in it. Madhya Pradesh Archeology Department has preserved this.

There is also a temple dedicated to Lord Hanuman where thousands of devotees come to visit every day.

== Location ==
Garhpehra is well connected with Roads. Nearby major city is Sagar 10 km away from here, it's located on Jhansi Sagar Road, Sagar railway station is nearby railway station from Garhpehra.
