= Tada, Madhya Pradesh =

Town in Madhya Pradesh, India

Tada (टड़ा)
- Town
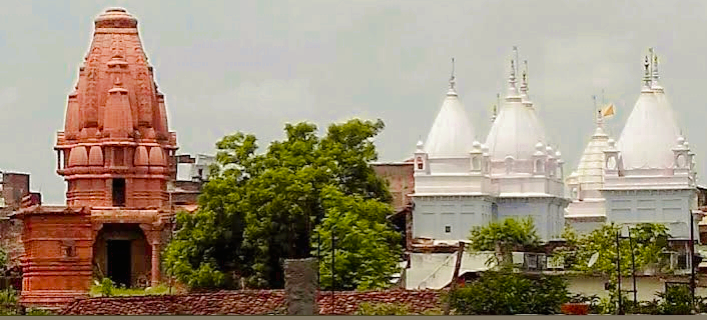
- Digambar Jain Mandir

- Location in Madhya Pradesh, India
- Coordinates: 23.41°N 78.66°E
- Country: India
- State: Madhya Pradesh
- Division: Sagar
- District: Sagar
- Tehsil: Kesli
- PIN: 470235

Tada is a village located in Sagar District of Madhya Pradesh India. The Sunar River originates from near the town.

== Geography ==
Tada is located on 23.41°N 78.66°E. Tada is located 17 km from tehsil headquarter Kesli, and 80 km away from district headquarter Saugor.

== Population ==
As of 2011, Tada village has a population of 3,149 (6,000 in 2021) of which 1679 are males while 1470 are females as per population census of 2011. The literacy rate of Tada village was 86.47%. It is the second largest town in Kesli tehsil.

== Transport ==
Tada is connected by private bus services to all nearest major cities. Being located on State Highway 30, it is well connected to major cities.

== See also ==
- Sagar District
- Deori Assembly constituency
- Kesli
