= Banda, Madhya Pradesh =

Indian city

Banda
- Town
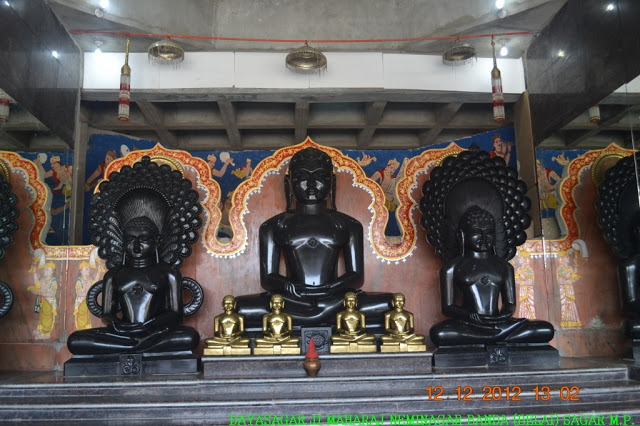
- Dayasagar Ji Maharaj

- Location in Madhya Pradesh, India Banda (India)
- Coordinates: 24°02′26″N 78°57′44″E
- Country: India
- State: Madhya Pradesh
- District: Sagar
- Elevation: 358 m (1,175 ft)

Population (2011)
  - Total: 30,923

Languages
  - Official: Hindi
- Time zone: UTC+5:30 (IST)
- PIN code: 470335
- ISO 3166 code: IN-MP
- Vehicle registration: MP15

Banda(बंडा) is city and a Nagar panchayat in Sagar district of Madhya Pradesh in India. Banda also a tehsil headquarter in Sagar.

== Geography ==
Banda is located at 24.04°N 78.96°E. Banda has an average elevation of 508 metres (1669 ft).

== Demographics ==
=== Population ===
The Banda Nagar Panchayat has population of 30,923 of which 15,962 are males while 14,961 are females as Census India 2011.

=== Sex ratio ===
Banda Nagar Panchayat, female sex ratio is of 937 against state average of 931. Moreover the child sex ratio in Banda is around 991 compared to Madhya Pradesh state average of 918.

=== Literacy rate ===
Banda city is 82.80% higher than the state average of 69.32%. In Banda, male literacy is around 89.75% while the female literacy rate is 75.31%.

== Places of interest ==
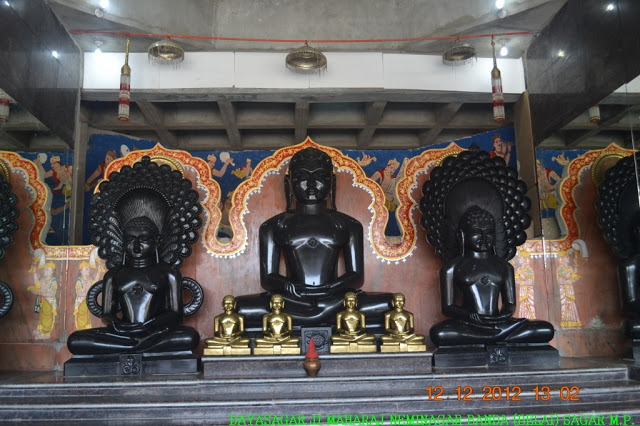
Digamber Jain Tirtha Kshetra

Neminagar Jain Tirth is in Banda tehsil located 30 km from Sagar on National Highway NH-86. It was built in the name of Aacharya Shri 108 Nemisagar ji maharaj by the blessings of his disciple aacharya 108 shri dayasagar ji maharaj. This temple has one choubisi (24 tirthankars god on 24 different altars), one levitated trikal choubisi (Lords of time passes, the time now and time to be), and a navagraha mandir (Lords of nine planets).

== Transportation ==
Banda is well Connected by Roads. Sagar is 35 km away from Banda. Daily bus service is available there.

== See also ==
- Banda Assembly
- Shahgarh
