= Gaurjhamar =

Town in Madhya Pradesh, India

- Town
- Location in Madhya Pradesh, India Gaurjhamar (India)
- Coordinates: 23.52°N 78.93°E
- Country: India
- State: Madhya Pradesh
- District: Sagar

Government
  - Body: Gram panchyat

Population (2011)
  - Total: 9,746

Languages
  - Official: Hindi
- Time zone: UTC+5:30 (IST)
- Postal code: 470226
- ISO 3166 code: IN-MP
- Vehicle registration: MP-15

Gaurjhamar is a town in Sagar district, Madhya Pradesh, India. It is located on NH 44. It is near the city of Deori.

== Geography ==
Gourjhamar is located on 23.55°N 78.93°E. It has an average elevation of 508 metres (1669 feet). Sunar River flow near Goujhamar town.

== Population ==
Gaurjhamar town has population of 9,746 of which 5,148 are males while 4,598 are females as of the 2011 census. In total 2195 families reside there.

== See also ==
- Deori
- Kesli
