= Kesli =

Town in Sagar District of Madhya Pradesh in India

- Town
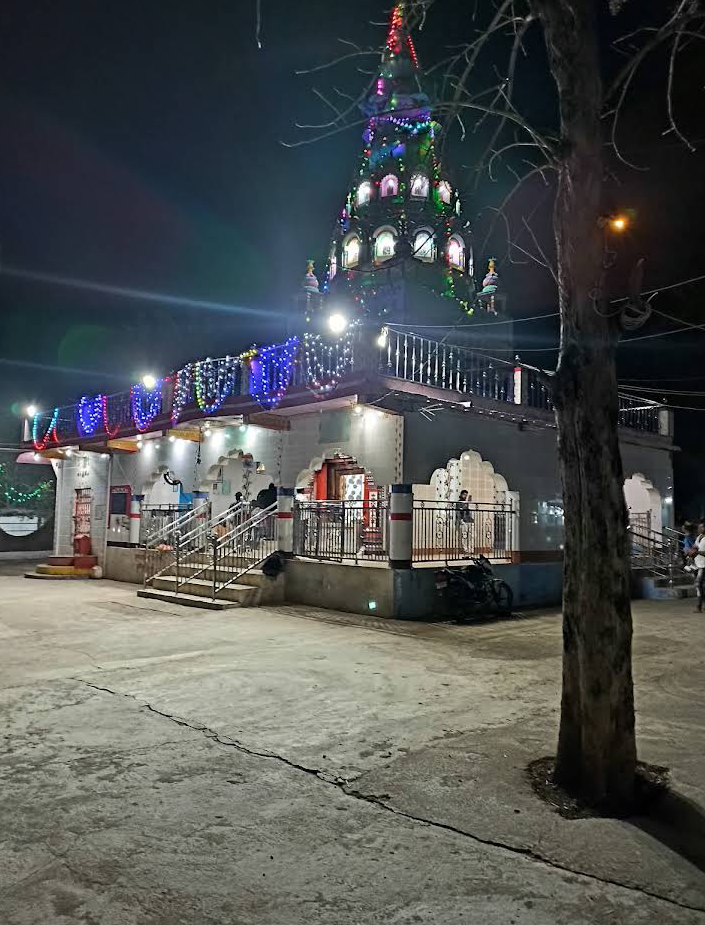
- Bandevi Temple

- Location in Madhya Pradesh, India Kesli (India)
- Coordinates: 23°25′09″N 78°48′19″E
- Country: India
- State: Madhya Pradesh
- District: Sagar

Government
  - Type: Janpad Panchyat
  - Body: Gram panchyat
- Elevation: 358 m (1,175 ft)

Population (2011)
  - Total: 8,586

Languages
  - Official: Hindi
- Time zone: UTC+5:30 (IST)
- PIN code: 470235
- ISO 3166 code: IN-MP
- Vehicle registration: MP15

Kesli is a small town in the Sagar district of India, in Madhya Pradesh. Kesli is a tehsil headquarters and a Development Block.

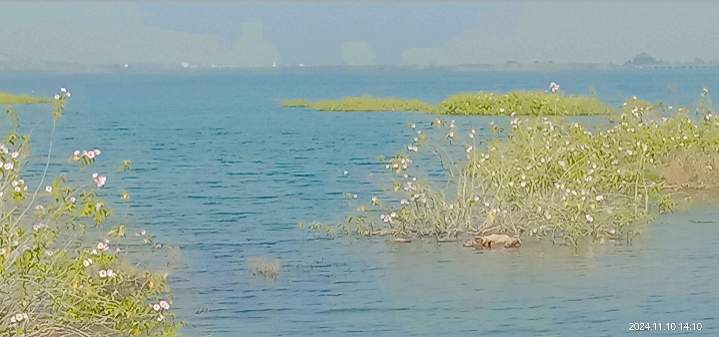
kesli reservoir

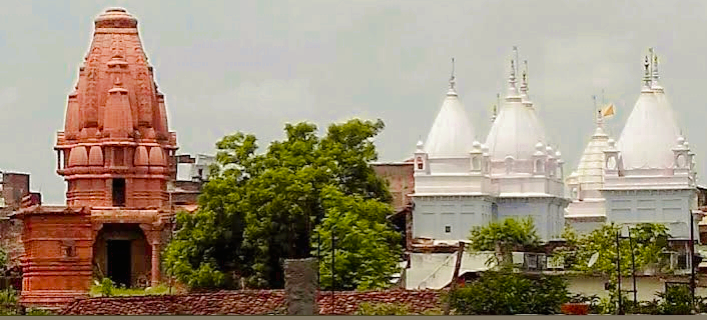
Jain Mandir Tada

== Geography ==
Kesli is situated at 23.42°N 78.80°E, it is 65km from the district headquarters, Sagar and 35 km away from Deori.

Many forests are found here, among which teak and tendu leaves are prominent. Sunar River originates from here,

== Demographics ==
Kesali town has population of 8586 of which 4501 are males while 4085 are females as Census 2011. In 2011, literacy rate of Kesali town was 81.53 % compared to 69.32 % of Madhya Pradesh.

== Services ==
All services are available. There is a Police Station and a Community Hospital. Many Bank Services are also available. A weekly market is also organized here. Which is held on Thursday.

== Places to Attraction ==
- Shri Viddhyasagar Dam (kesli reservoir)
- Shri Vandevi Mata Temple
- Shri Digambar Jain Temple Tada

== Transportation ==
Kesli is well connected by road to Sagar and Deori, daily buses run from here. It is located on MP SH 30 SH 30.

== Economy ==
The region is predominantly agrarian. Farming and dairy production is major source of economy. Forest procurement is another source of income. The major commercial crops are Wheat, Paddy and corn, which is produced in large quantity and a major source of income. Some Ston Crusher and Rice mill Available in this aria.

There are several small and big villages within the vicinity of Kesli. It is a regional hub for the buying of various daily-use products and the selling of grains.

== Education ==
There are number of educational institutions in Kesli, such as Government College, Kesli, and a Government Boys and Government Girls schools.

There's some private school and college also in the town

=== Schools ===
1. Saraswati Shishu Mandir
2. Horizon education convent school
3. Aastha High School

=== College ===
1. Pt. Mahadev College
2. Dignity College

== See also ==
- Gaurjhamar
- Tada
- Bankori
