= Pateriya Ji =

Jain Temple in Sagar, Madhya Pradesh

Shree 1008 Parshvanatha Digambar Jain Atishay Kshetra Pateriya Ji
- श्री 1008 पार्श्वनाथ दिगम्बर जैन अतिशय क्षेत्र पटेरिया जी
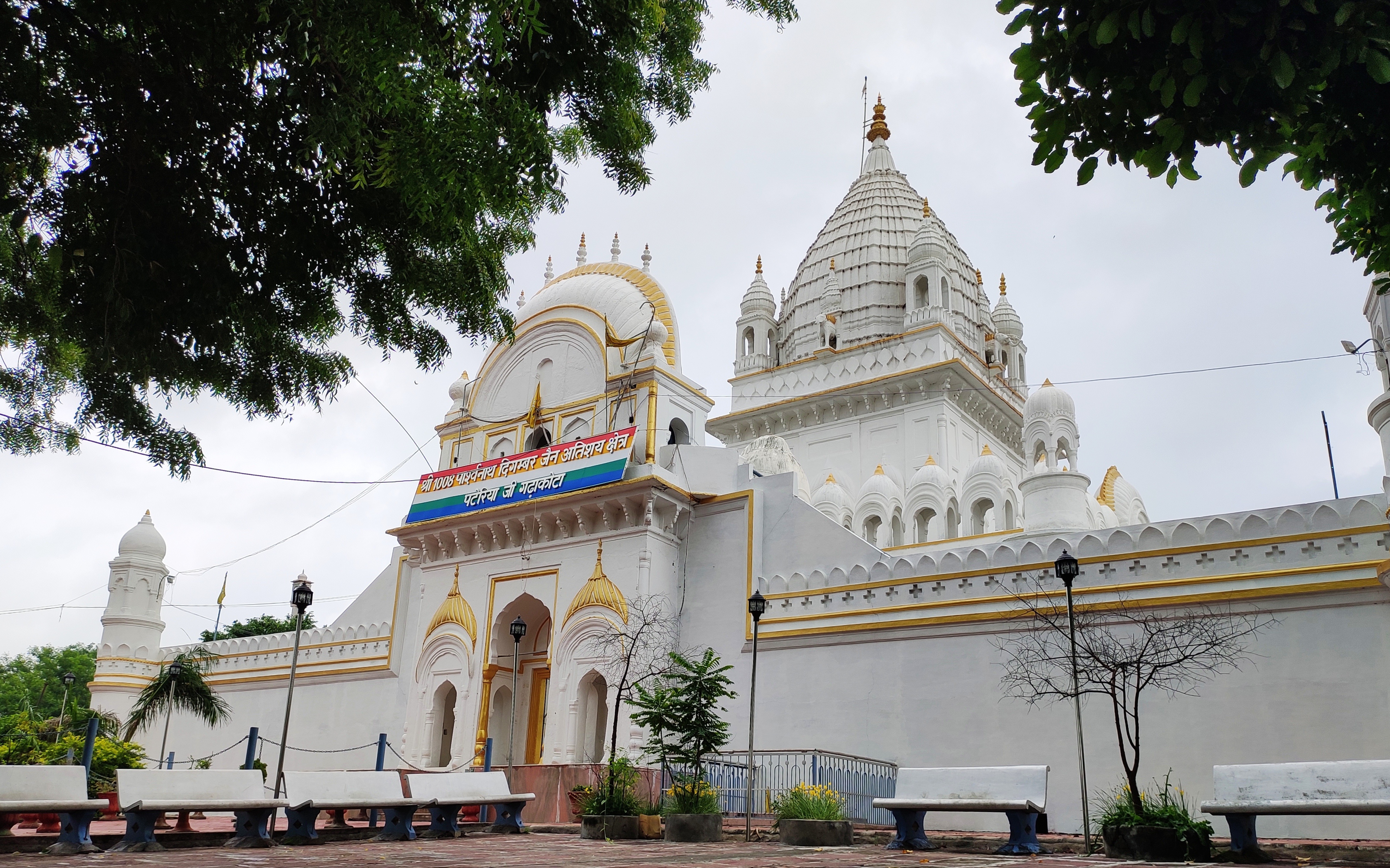
- Pateriya Ji

- Location within Madhya Pradesh

Religion
- Affiliation: Jainism
- Deity: Parshvanath
- Festival: Annual Mela Kartik Sudi 13-15
- Governing body: Shree Digambar Jain Atishaya Kshetra Pateriyaji Managing Committee

Location
- Location: Garhakota, Sagar district, Madhya Pradesh
- Interactive map of Shree 1008 Parshvanatha Digambar Jain Atishay Kshetra Pateriya Ji
- Coordinates: 23.770278°N 79.145333°E

Architecture
- Creator: Shah Shree Mohandas Ji
- Established: 18th century
- Temple: 2

Lord Parshvanatha (Main Garbhagriha and Vedi at Pateriya Ji)

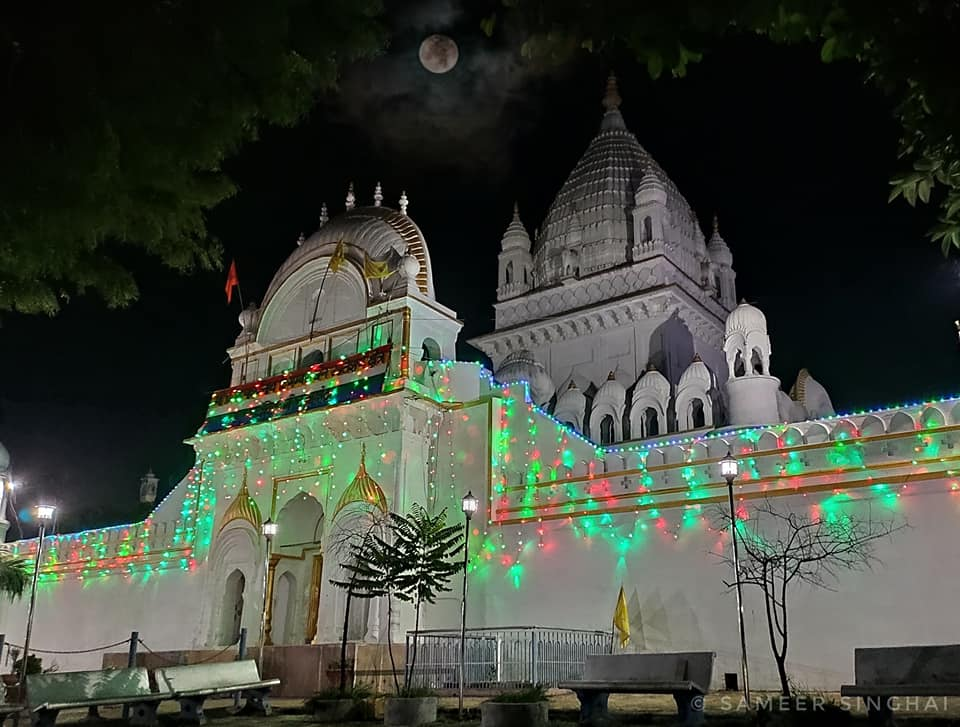
Pateriya Ji Night View

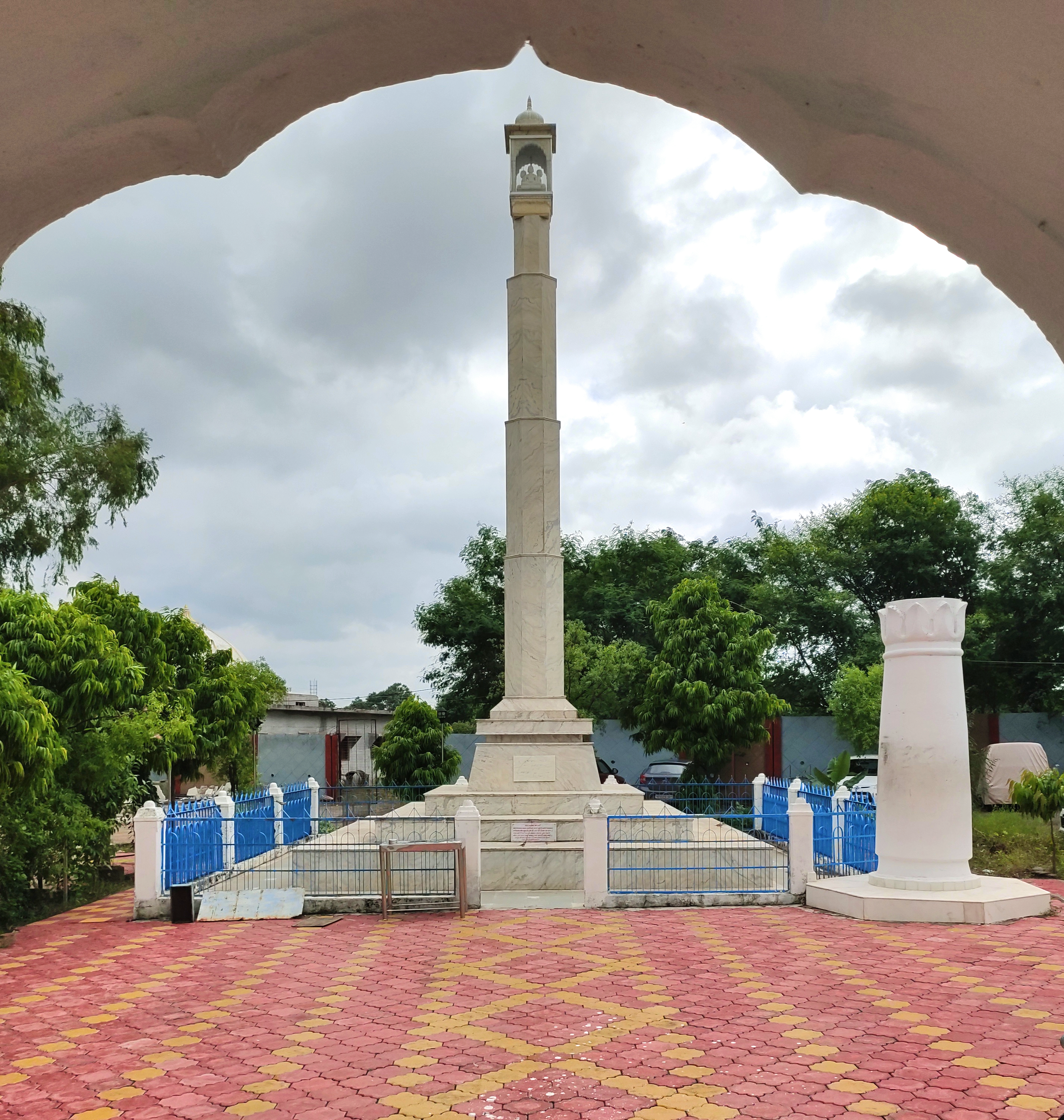
Manastambha at Pateriya Ji

Pateriya Ji (Hindi: पटेरिया जी) is a Jain temple site in Madhya Pradesh, India, on the outskirts of Garhakota in Sagar district. This is an atishaya kshetra ("miraculous holy place")

== History ==
This Jain temple is more than 200 Years old, built by the family of Shah Mohandas, of Golapurva Banonya clan, out of their one-day earning from the cotton trade in 1782 A.D. (V.S. 1839). The inscriptions of the three Parshvanath statues are there in first vedi . The principal deity of Pateriya is Lord Parsvanath (The 23rd Teerthankar). The three idols are 7 feet in height in Padmasana posture build in Black Stone with three serpent hoods. The spire of this temple is 90 feet high surrounded by a thick wall.

The images were consecrated by Bhattaraka Mahendrakirti of Balatkara Gana, Mula Sangha during the rule of Bundela ruler Harisingh (samvat 1829–1842). Garhakota was then known as Hirdayanagar. The architecture of the temple is similar to the Shree Dig. Jain Chaudhari Mandir at nearby Garhakota. This temple was built in 1891(V.S. 1948), has 60 feet high spire. It consist 63 idols, moolnayak of this temple is an idol of Lord Parsvanath having 1000 serpent hoods.

According to the inscriptions, Bhattaraka Mahendrakirti was the presiding Bhattaraka for most of pratishthas at Patnaganj (samvat 1835-1842) and Bina Baraha (sam 1832), and was also responsible for administering Kundalpur during the Bundela period after its renovation in Samvat 1757.

Jain Muni Shree Guptisagar was born in Garhakota.

The nearby Garhakota fort has rivers Sunar and Gadhairi on the two sides. It covers 11 acres. This fort was the residence of Rajput Kings of Garhakota. Another fort was situated behind the main fort which was the residence of Pateriyas. They were Zameendars of the Pateriya Riyasat. During The War of Independence in 1857, Rani of Jhansi Lakshmi Bai wrote a letter to Raja Mardan Singh Bahadur of Garhakota to prepare against the British troops and to stop them at Sagar. Mardan Singh and Gunthai Pateriya were killed in this battle. The fort was raided and demolished by Sir Hugh Rose in 1858 in the course of Ghadar. Pateriya fort, Gopalji Krishna temple, Jagannathji Pateriya Vishnu temple and Shiv temple were built in 16th century AD. The Pateriya fort was abandoned after the Ghadar rampage. Pateriyas were Jijhotiya Brahmins and this was not their original surname but the title which was awarded by the Bundela king Jujhar Sing after their victorious participation in a big battle against the Moguls in 17th century.

== Architecture ==
The tall temple is a pristine example of the Maratha/Bundeli architecture of Jain temples of the period. The temple is surrounded by a tall wall (parkota) with a walkway on the top. It is said that a gaddi (seat) for Bhattarak Mahendrakirti existed in the chamber above the main entrance. Internally there is an enclosed parikrama where additional shrines are now located.

== Reported Miracles ==
According to the tradition, the water at a spring (kunda) just outside the temple was miraculously turned into ghee by Bhattaraka Mahendrakirti. There is an old column on the East side of the temple. It is believed that circumambulation of the column fulfills desires and removes afflictions.

== Administration ==
The administration and day-to-day activities of Pareriyaji are controlled by the Shree Digamber Jain Atishay Kshetra Pateriya Ji Prabhandhkarini Committee headed by Jeevan Kumar Singhai of sagar and Bal Chand Seth of Garhakota.

== Nearby Sites ==
The nearby Garhakota fort was raided and breached by Sir Hugh Rose in 1858 in the course of Ghadar. In the outskirts of Garhakota, there exists a rock which was being carved as a Jain image, which was abandoned when the sponsor was killed in the Ghadar rampage.

Nearby Jain Tirthas include Kundalpur 70 km, Nainagiri 100 km, Patnaganj 20 km, Bina-Barha50 km.

== Gallery ==
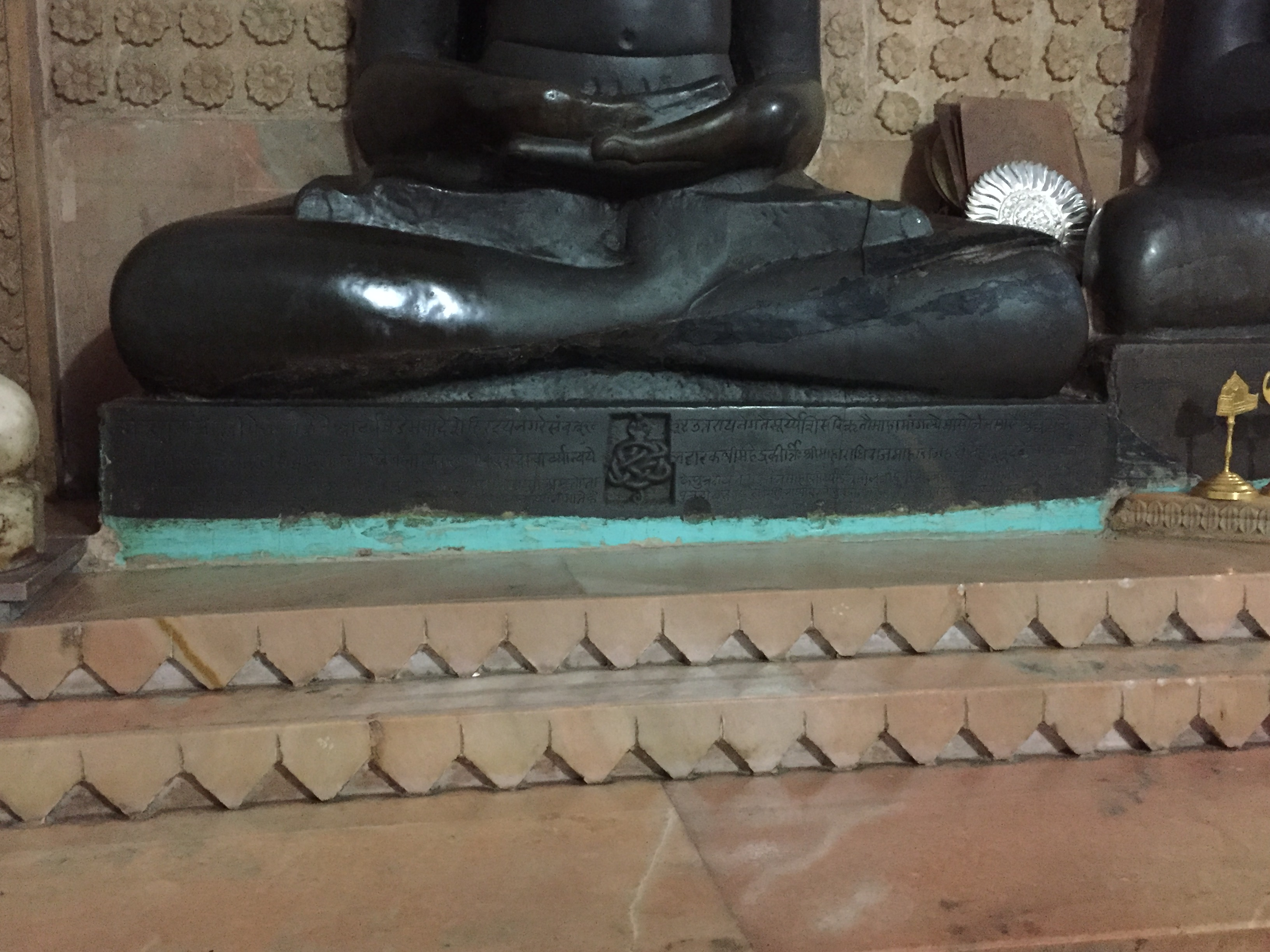
Inscription mentioning Bhattaraka Mahendrakirti

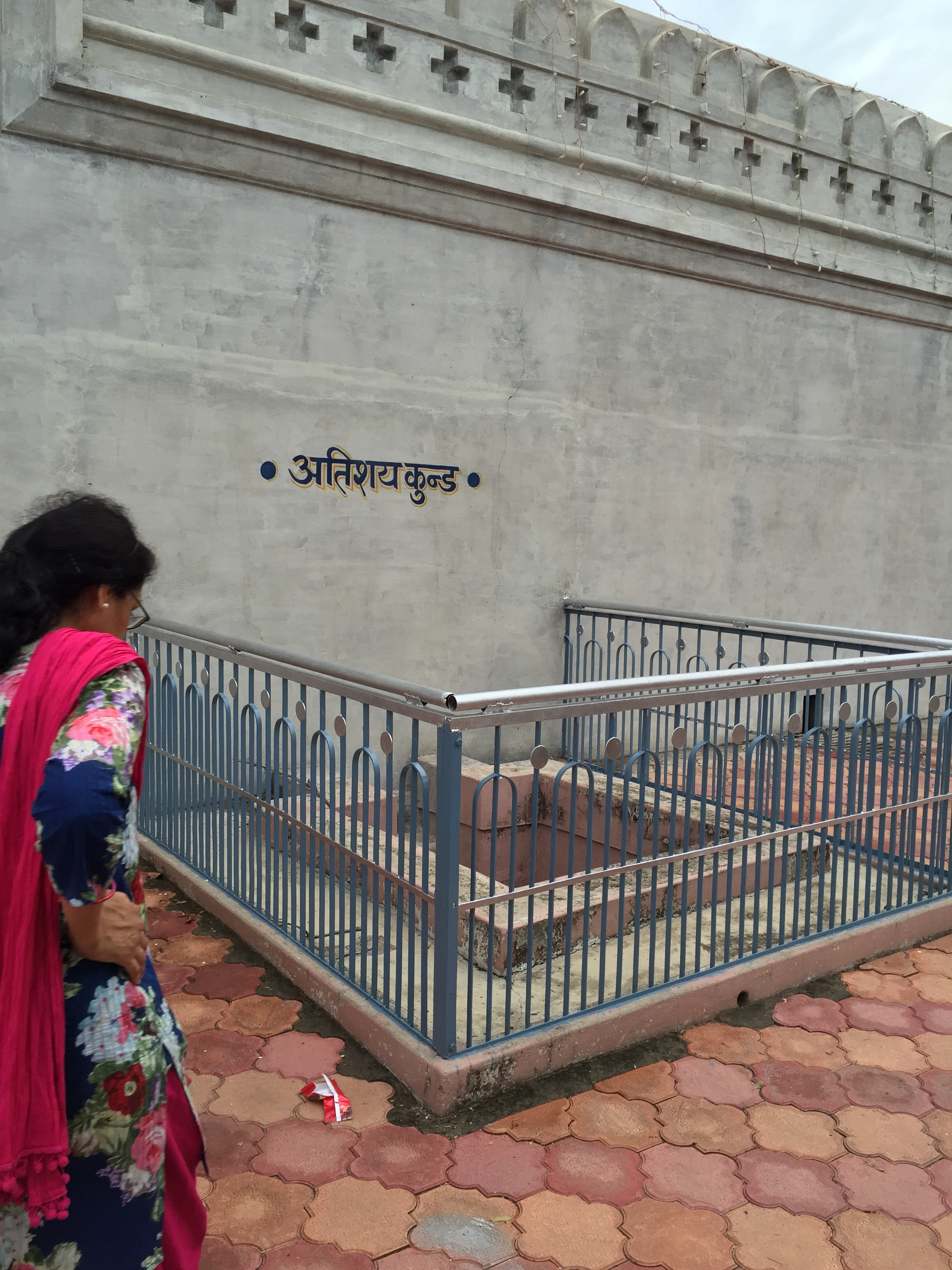
Atishaya Kunda

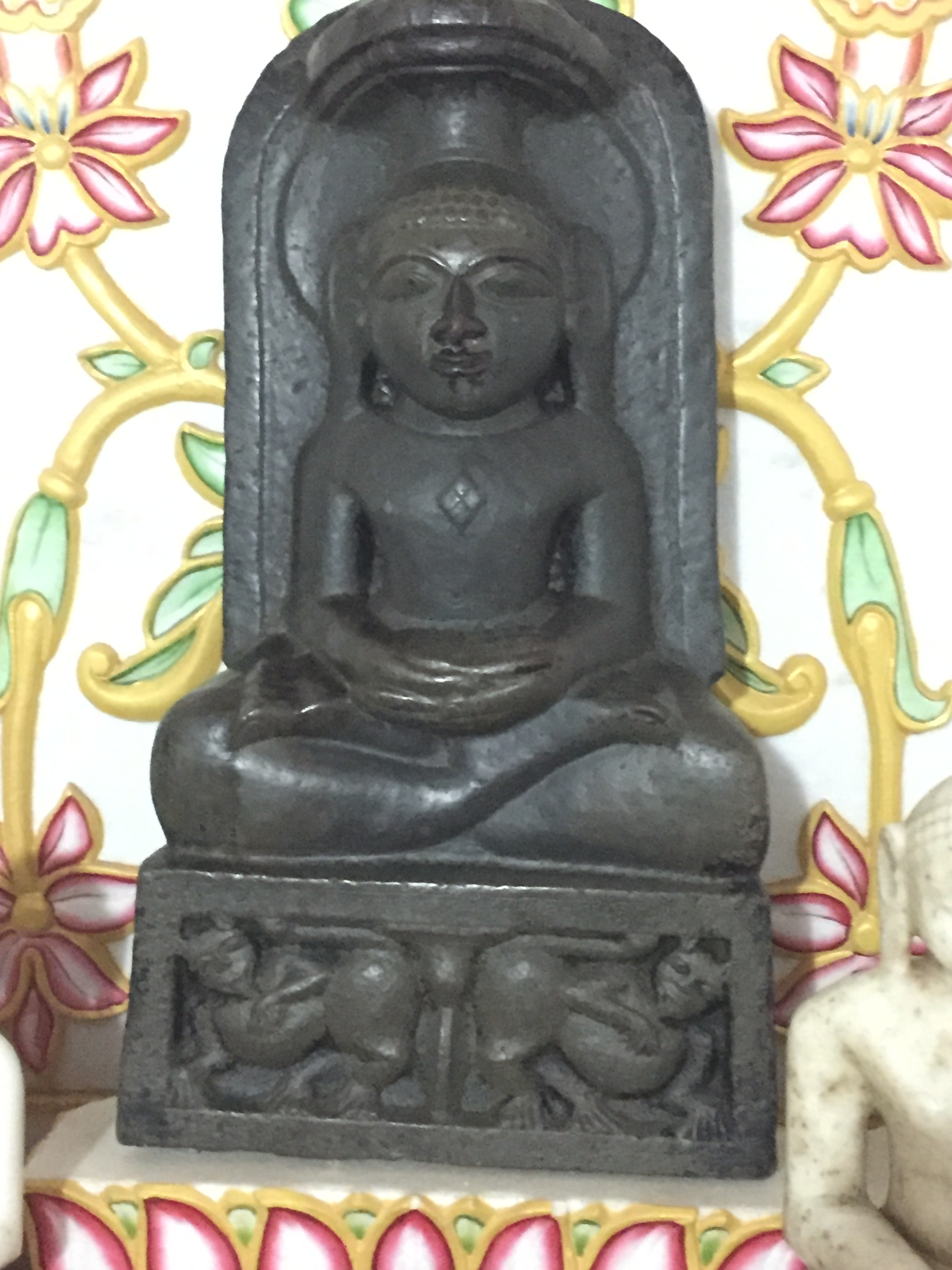
Small image also consecrated by Bhattaraka Mahendrakirti

== See also ==
- Garhakota
- Bandhaji
- Beenaji
- Aharji
