= Beenaji =

Jain Temple in Sagar, Madhya Pradesh

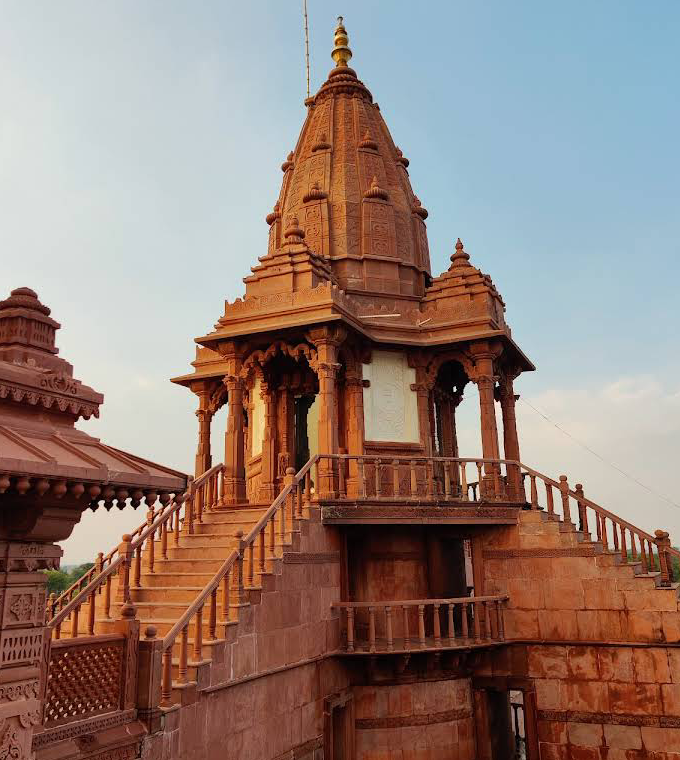
- Beenaji temple

- Location within Madhya Pradesh

Religion
- Affiliation: Jainism
- Sect: Digambara
- Deity: Shantinatha
- Festival: Mahavir Jayanti

Location
- Location: Beena Barha village, Deori tehsil Sagar, Madhya Pradesh
- Coordinates: 23.36°N 79.07°E

Architecture
- Style: Nagara architecture

Beenaji or Beena Barha is a Jain temples located in Sagar District of Madhya Pradesh. The temple are located near Deori Kalan City.

== Information ==
Bina Barah Jain Temple is a famous Jain temple located in Sagar district, it is a Jain Atishay Kshetra. That Is 12 km away from Deori.

== Description ==
Beena Barha The Jain temples of Bina Barha are an Atishay Jain tirth, located in the rural area of Garhpipariya in Deori. Acharya Vidyasagar has visited this temple many times for Chaturmas and has been a source of inspiration for the residents of Deori during religious functions organized in the city.

== Nearby sites ==
Nearby Jain Tirthas include Kundalpur 85 km, Nainagiri 120 km, Patnaganj 27 km, Pateriya Ji50 km.

== Gallery ==
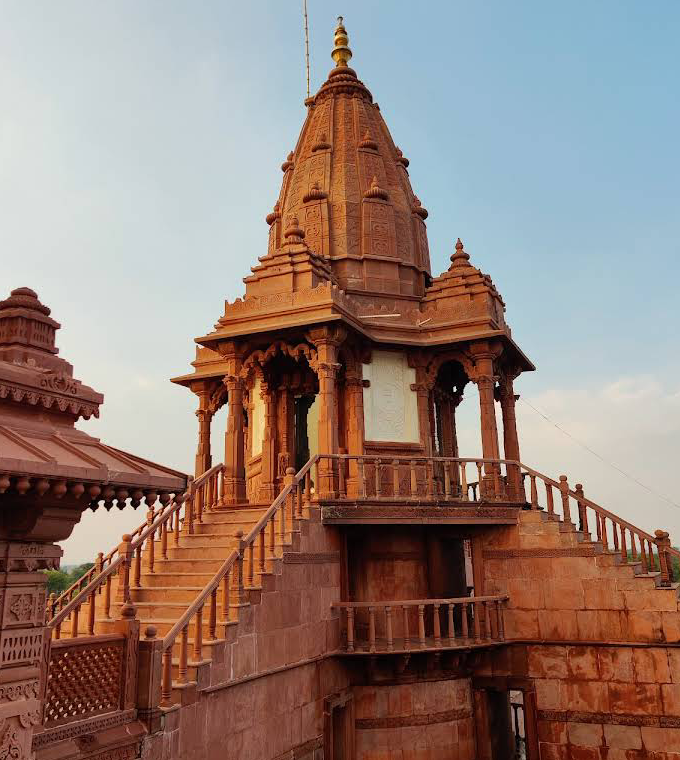
Beenaji

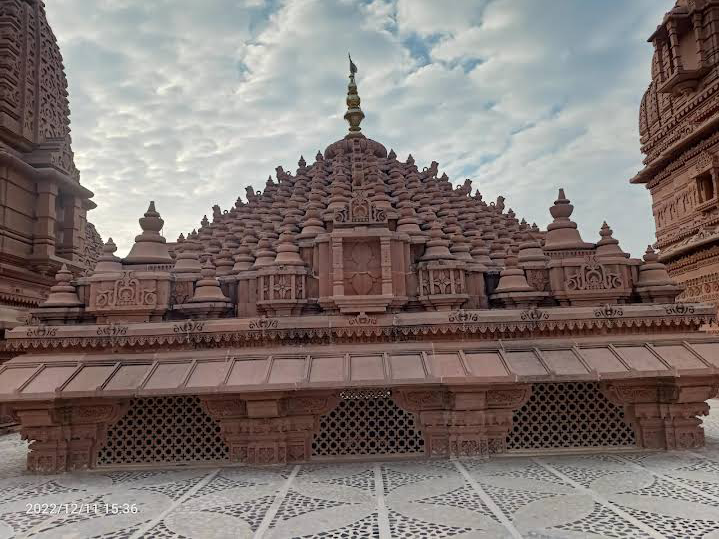
Beenaji Temples

== See also ==
- Sagar District
- List of Jain temples
- Pateriya Ji
- Aharji
- Paporaji
