= Karrapur =

- Census town
- Location in Madhya Pradesh, India Karrapur (India)
- Coordinates: 23.95°N 78.85°E
- Country: India
- State: Madhya Pradesh
- District: Sagar
- Elevation: 497 m (1,631 ft)

Population (2001)
  - Total: 9,285

Languages
  - Official: Hindi
- Time zone: UTC+5:30 (IST)
- ISO 3166 code: IN-MP
- Vehicle registration: MP

Karrapur is a census town in Sagar district in the Indian state of Madhya Pradesh.

== Geography ==
Karrapur is located at 23.95°N 78.85°E. It has an average elevation of 497 metres (1,630 feet).

== Demographics ==
As of 2001 India census, Karrapur had a population of 9,285. Males constitute 53% of the population and females 47%. Karrapur has an average literacy rate of 61%, higher than the national average of 59.5%: male literacy is 72%, and female literacy is 48%. In Karrapur, 18% of the population is under 6 years of age.
