= Shahgarh =

- Town
- Location in Madhya Pradesh, India Shahgarh (India)
- Coordinates: 24.32°N 79.13°E
- Country: India
- State: Madhya Pradesh
- District: Sagar
- Founder: Bakhat Bali Shah

Government
  - Type: Nagar Parishad

Population (2011)
  - Total: 16,300

Languages
  - Official: Hindi
- Time zone: UTC+5:30 (IST)
- Postal code: 470339
- ISO 3166 code: IN-MP
- Vehicle registration: MP - 15

Shahgarh is a town and a tahsil in Sagar district in the Indian state of Madhya Pradesh. Its connected with National Highway No. 86 Route, National Highway 539 and MP SH 37.

== Geography ==
Shahgarh is located at 24.32°N 79.13°E. It has an average elevation of 411 metres (1,348 feet).

== Demographics ==
At the 2001 India census, Shahgarh had a population of 14,585. Males constituted 52% of the population and females 48%. Shahgarh had an average literacy rate of 62%, higher than the national average of 59.5%: male literacy was 69% and female literacy 53%. 18% of the population were under 6 years of age.

== See also ==
- Banda
