= Lajpatpura =

- town
- Country: India
- State: Madhya Pradesh

Languages
  - Official: Hindi
- Time zone: UTC+5:30 (IST)
- ISO 3166 code: IN-MP
- Vehicle registration: MP 15

Lajpatpura is a locality in Sagar in Madhya Pradesh state in India. Its PIN code is 470002. It is one of the 51 wards in Sagar municipal corporation. One of the private schools in the area is Bright School.
