= Aabchand Caves =

Caves and archaeological site in India

Aabchand Caves Aabchand Caves
- Caves and archaeological site
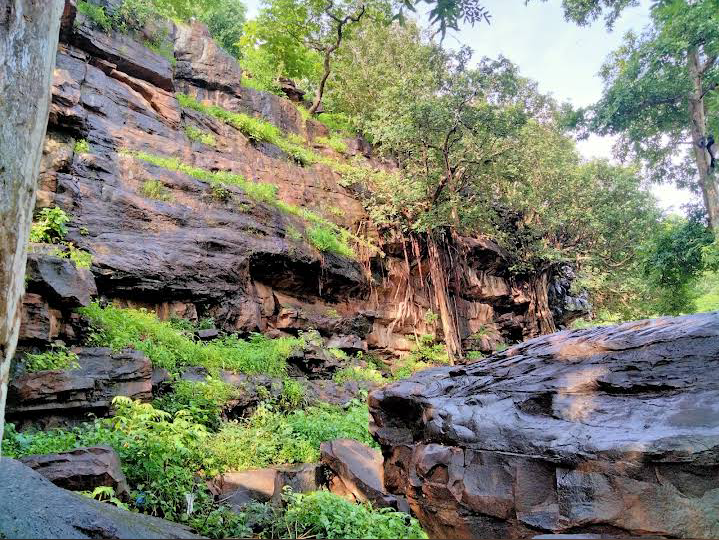
- Aabchand rock Shelter's

- Location within Madhya Pradesh Location within India
- Coordinates: 23.78°N 79.00°E
- Country: India
- State: Madhya Pradesh
- District: Sagar

Aabchand Caves are in Aapchand village in Sagar District of Madhya Pradesh, near the banks of Gadheri River.

== History ==
There are around a dozen rock caves. They reveal prehistoric human occupation, with the life and daily routine of humans depicted on stones.

== Caves and paintings ==
The largest cave is around 40 feet in length and its walls contain more than a dozen paintings showing prehistoric activities, including hunting scenes representing individuals and groups of hunters with bows and arrows, spears and other weapons. The game animals shown include bison, bulls, antelopes, tigers, and boars.
