= Sagar district =

Coordinates: 23°48′N 78°40′E

- District of Madhya Pradesh
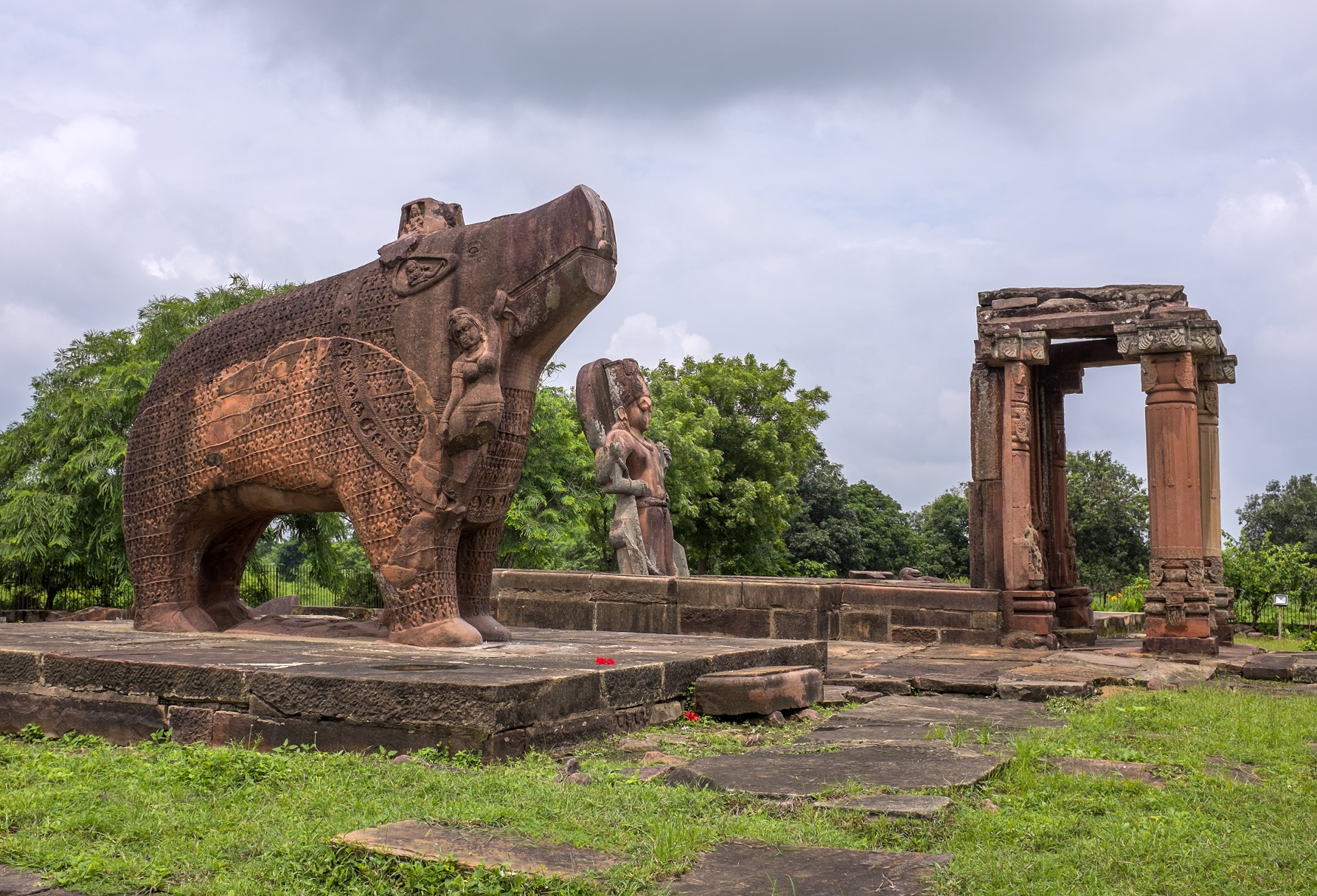
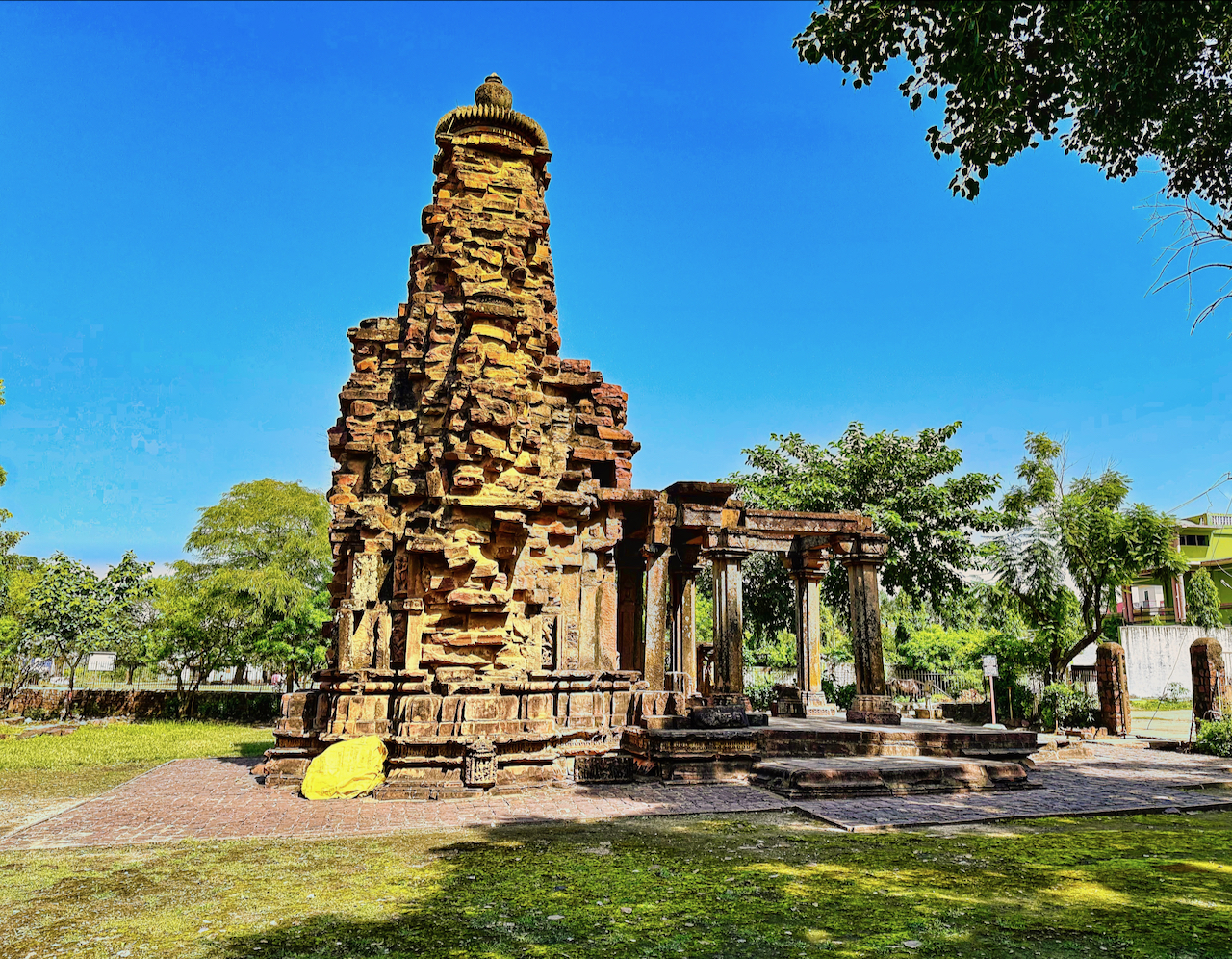
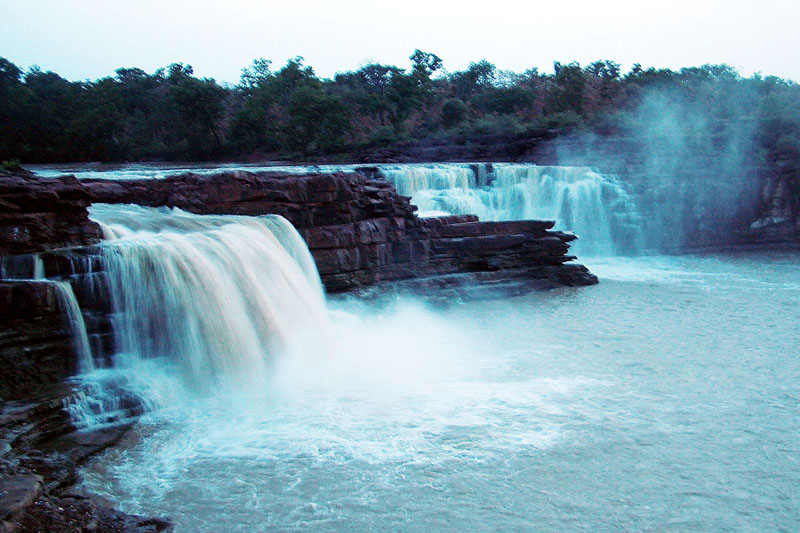
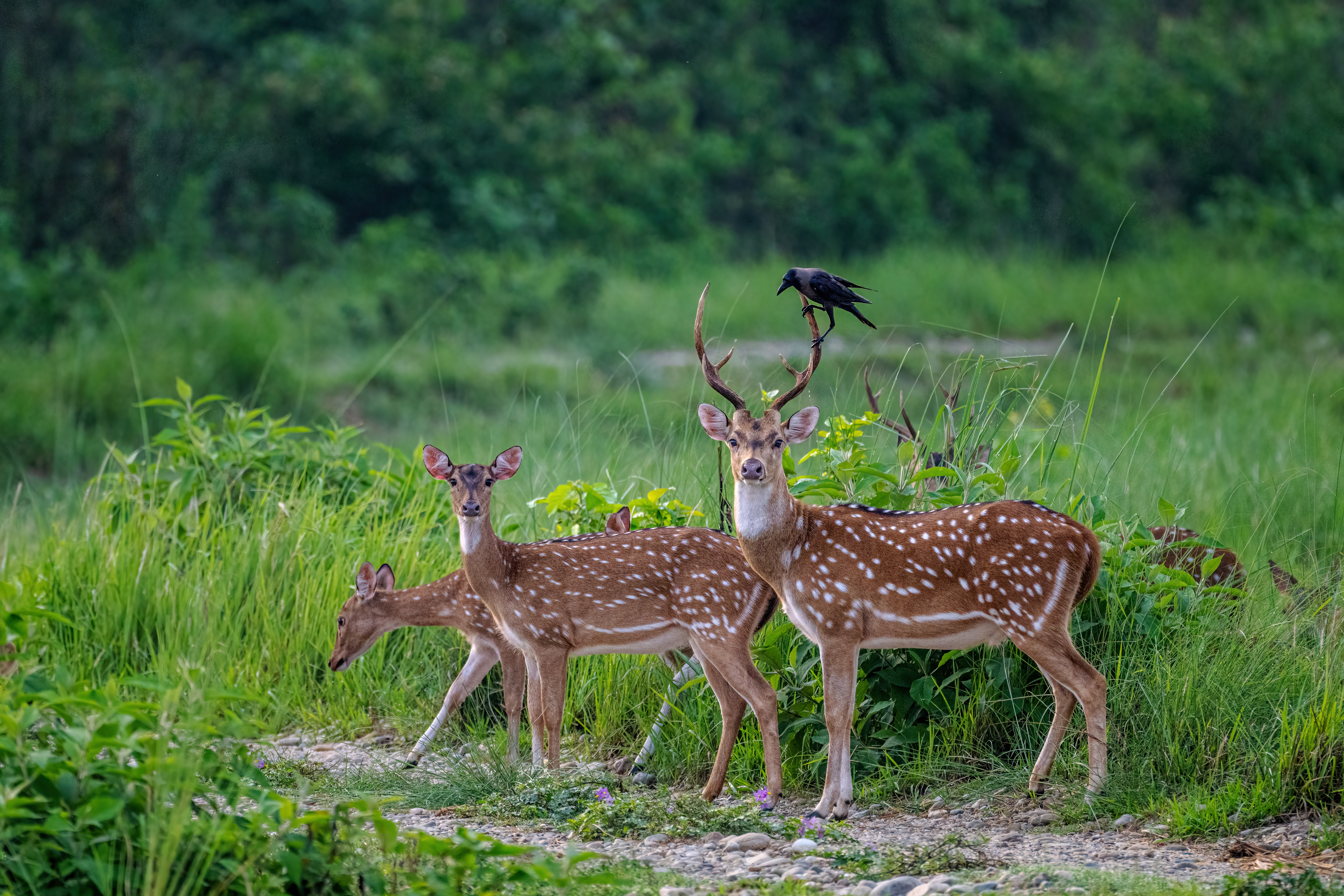
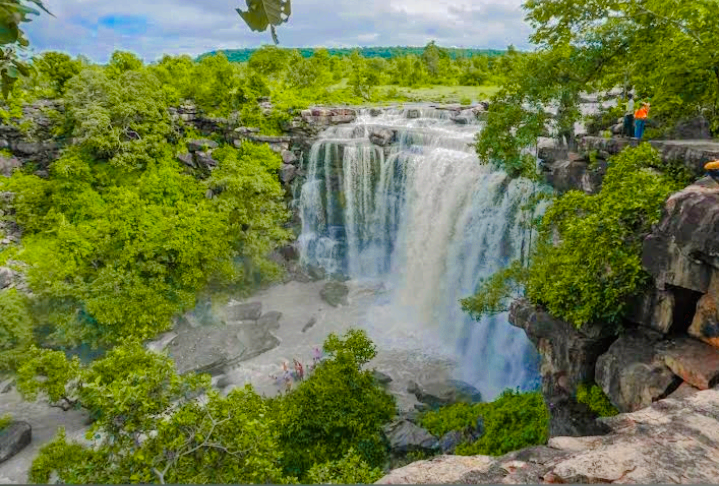
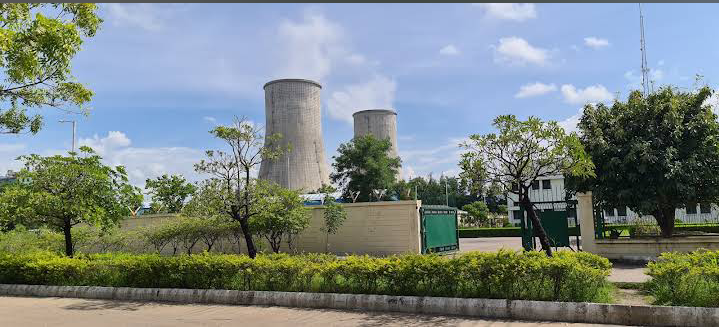
- Top: Varah Statue Eran, Hazariya Mahadev Temple Bamora, Chital in Nauradehi Wildlife Sanctuary, Bhalkund Water fall Rahatgarh, Kanakdhar Kund Water Fall, Malthon, Thermal Plant in Bina

- Location of Sagar district in Madhya Pradesh
- Country: India
- State: Madhya Pradesh
- Division: Sagar
- Headquarters: Sagar
- Tehsils: List: 12; 1. Sagar; 2. Bina; 3. Khurai; 4. Banda; 5. Deori; 6. Rahatgarh; 7. Shahgarh; 8. Malthon; 9. Rehli; 10. Garhakota; 11. Kesli; 12. Jaisinagar

Government
  - Lok Sabha constituencies: Sagar, Damoh
  - Vidhan Sabha constituencies: 8

Area
  - Total: 10,252 km^{2} (3,958 sq mi)

Population (2011)
  - Total: 2,378,458
  - Density: 232.00/km^{2} (600.88/sq mi)

Demographics
  - Literacy: 77.52 per cent
  - Sex ratio: 896
- Time zone: UTC+05:30 (IST)
- Website: sagar.nic.in

Sagar district (Hindi pronunciation: [saːgəɾ]) is a district of Madhya Pradesh state in central India. The town of Sagar serves as its administrative center. Sagar district is called the heart district of India. The Tropic of Cancer (23°3') passes through Rangir Tiraha on NH26 present NH44 in Sagar district.

The district has an area of 10,252 km², and a population of 2,378,458 (2011 census), an increase of 45% or by 732,260 inhabitants from its 1991 population of 1,646,198. Sagar district is dominated by Sonis, Jains and Yadavs.

As of 2011, it is the third most populous district of Madhya Pradesh, after Indore and Jabalpur.

Sagar is the largest city of the Sagar district. Bina Sagar is the second largest city and important industrial city of the district. Bina has Bina Thermal Power Plant, Bina Refinery, Railway MEMU shed and a major railway junction of Madhya Pradesh state.

== History ==
=== Ancient history ===
The old capital, Garhpahrā, 7 miles north of the present city, is supposed to have been founded by a Gond dynasty. The Gonds were succeeded by a tribe of Ahīrs called the Faulādia, to whom is attributed the foundation of the fort at Rehli. Some Ahir landowners still claim to be their descendants and bear the title of Rao. About 1023 the Ahīrs were supplanted by one Nihālshā, a Rajput of Jalaun, who took possession of Saugor and the surround-ing country. Nihālsha's descendants retained possession for about

Firstly, Sagar was under the rules of Ahir-Rajas and their capital was at Garhpehra, located 7 miles north of the present city.

=== Modern history ===
The history of the town of Sagar dates back to about 1660 AD, when Udan Shah, a descendant of Nihal Shah, built a small fort where the present one sits and founded a village close to it called Parkota Sagar. The present fort and a settlement under its walls were founded by Govind Pant Bundele, an officer of the Peshwa Bajirao I, who controlled Sagar and the surrounding territory after 1735 when it came under the Peshwa's possession. In 1818, the greater part of the district was ceded by the Peshwa Baji Rao II to the British Government, while the remainder of the present district of Sagar came into the possession of the British between 1818 and 1860. Thereafter in 1861, the Saugor and Nerbudda territories (along with the Nagpur state) formed a Commissioner's Province called Central Provinces. Sagar was the headquarters of the Sagar Commissionership for a short period until 1863–64 when this district was incorporated with Jabalpur Commissionership. In the year 1932, the district of Damoh was added to the Sagar district and was administered as a Sub-Division. In 1956, however, Damoh Sub-Division was again separated from the district to form a separate district and the Sagar district consisted of four tehsils viz, Sagar, Khurai, Rehli, Banda.

== Geography ==
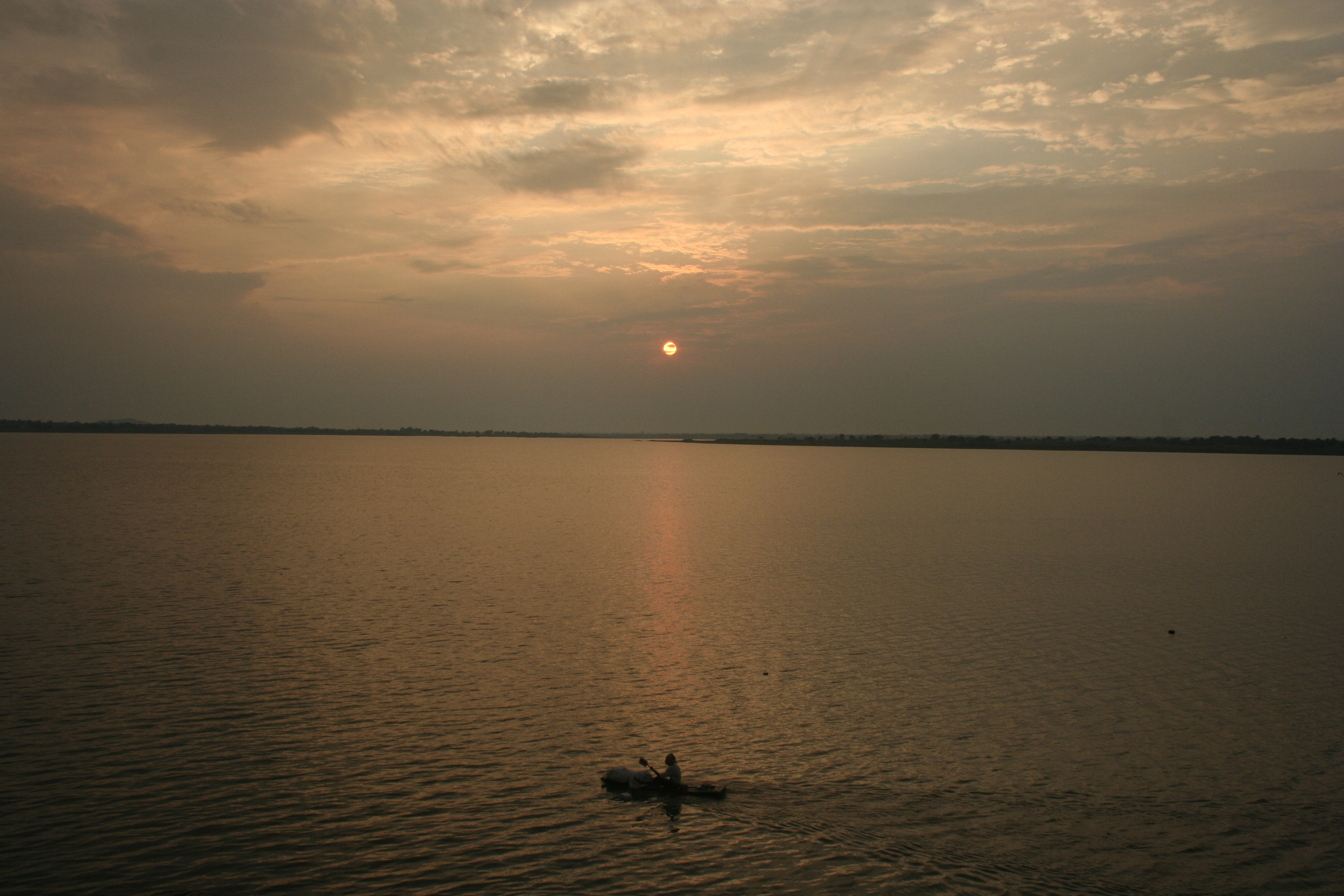
Sunset at Sagar

Sagar district is located in the middle of the state. The Tropic of Cancer passes through Sagar district. It is surrounded by Ashoknagar, Vidisha, Raisen, Narsinghpur, Damoh and Chhatarpur districts. Total area of Sagar district is 10,252 km2. Sagar is situated in the Vindhya mountain range and eastern part of the Malwa Plateau. The Sunar, Dhasan, Bina, and Bewas are the major rivers of the district.

== Demographics ==
Historical population
Year	Pop.	±% p.a.
1901	469,686	—
1911	541,256	+1.43%
1921	528,384	−0.24%
1931	544,928	+0.31%
1941	597,049	+0.92%
1951	636,191	+0.64%
1961	796,547	+2.27%
1971	1,062,291	+2.92%
1981	1,323,132	+2.22%
1991	1,647,736	+2.22%
2001	2,021,987	+2.07%
2011	2,378,458	+1.64%

Religions in Sagar district (2011)
Hinduism	92.43%
Islam	4.35%
Jainism	2.65%
Other or not stated	0.57%

According to the 2011 census, Sagar district has a population of 2,378,458, This gives it a ranking of 188th in India (out of a total of 640). The district has a population density of 232 inhabitants per square kilometre (600/sq mi). Its population growth rate over the decade 2001–2011 was 17.62%. Sagar has a sex ratio of 896 females for every 1000 males, and a literacy rate of 77.52%. 29.80% of the population lives in urban areas. Scheduled Castes and Tribes made up 21.09% and 9.33% of the population respectively.

Languages of Sagar district (2011)
1. Hindi (55.4%)
2. Bundeli (42.9%)
3. Others (1.69%)

At the time of the 2011 Census of India, 55.38% of the population in the district spoke Hindi and 42.93% Bundeli as their first language.

== Administrative divisions ==
There are 8 Constituencies in the district.

- 035 Bina Assembly constituency
- 036 Khurai, Madhya Pradesh Assembly constituency
- 037 Surkhi Assembly constituency
- 038 Deori Assembly constituency
- 039 Rehli Assembly constituency
- 040 Naryoli Assembly constituency
- 041 Sagar, Madhya Pradesh Assembly constituency
- 042 Banda, Madhya Pradesh Assembly constituency

== Culture ==
=== Pateriya Ji ===
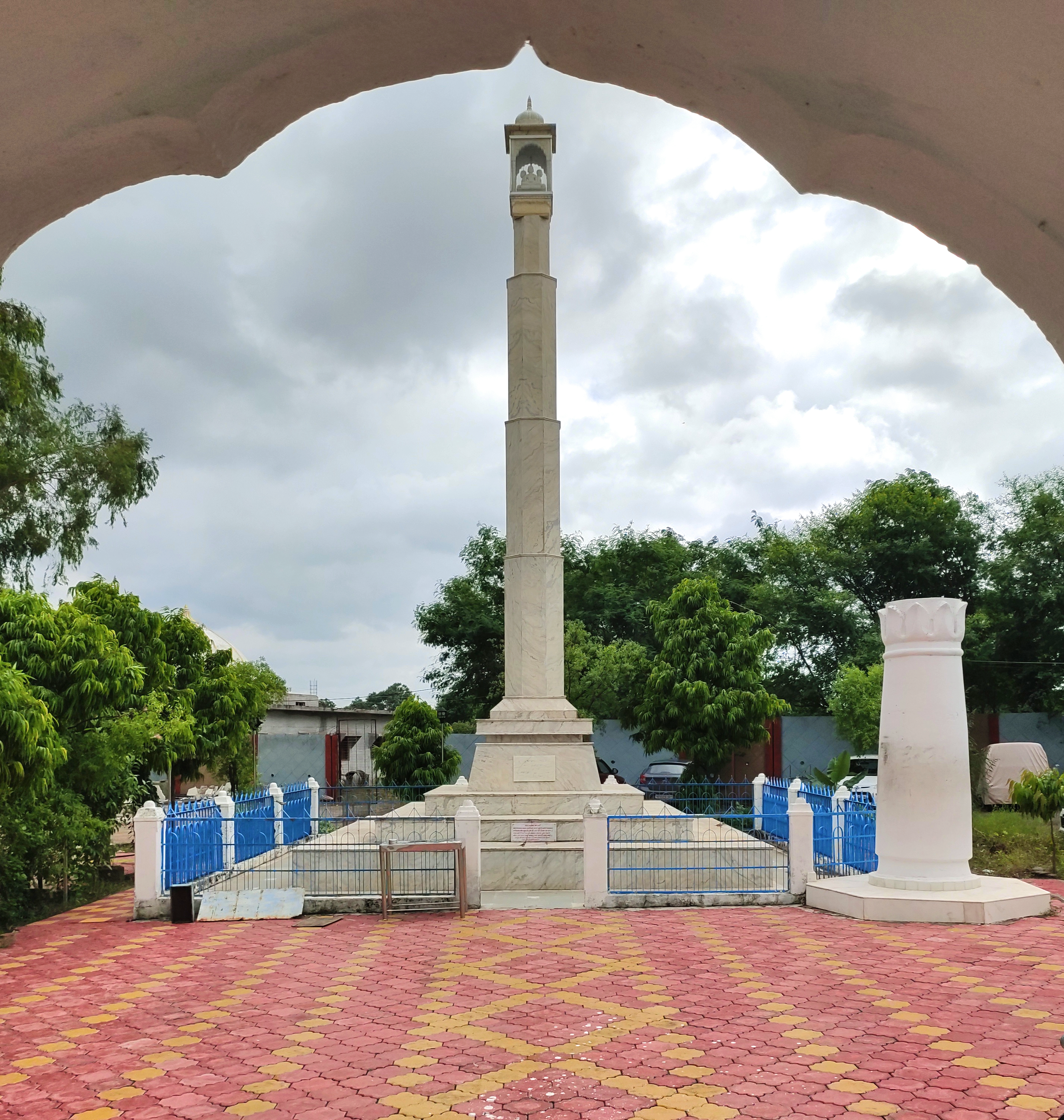
Manastambha at Pateriya Ji

Pateriya Ji is a 200 year-old temple dedicated to Parshvantha. The idol is 7 feet in height in Padmasana posture built in black stone with three serpent hoods. This temple was built by Seth Radha Kishanjun Shah in 1782 (V.S. 1839).

=== Mangalgiri Jain Teerth ===
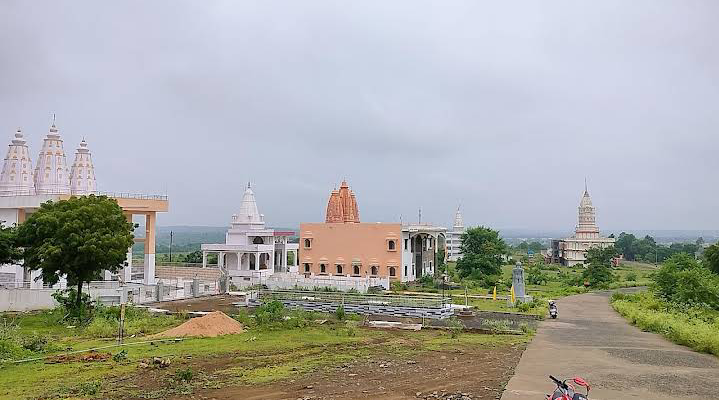
Mangalgiri Jain Temple

Mangalgiri is a holy Jain temple and pilgrimage centre located in Sagar. The kshetra situated on the outskirts of Sagar has the distinction of the heaviest idol of Lord Mahavir, weighing 9 MT made of brass and 11.25 feet high.

=== Beenaji Jain Kshetra ===
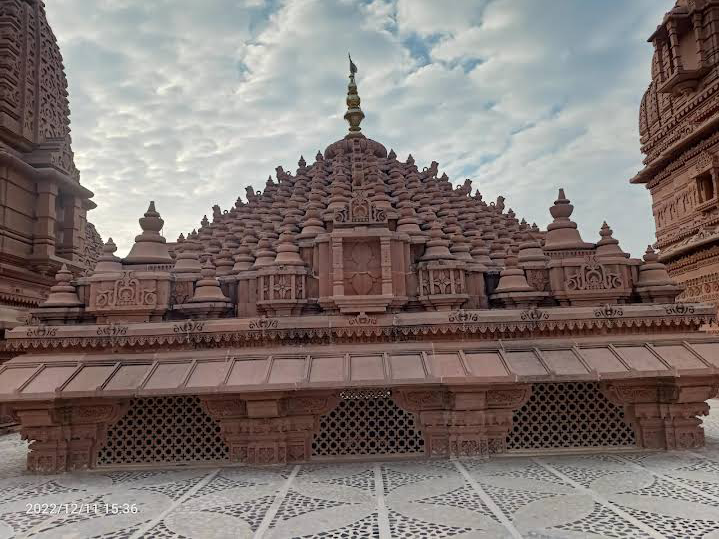
Beenaji jain Mandir

Beenaji is an Atishay Jain tirth, located in the rural area of Garhpipariya in Deori. Acharya Vidyasagar, an influential monk, has visited this temple many times for Chaturmas.

== Notable sites ==
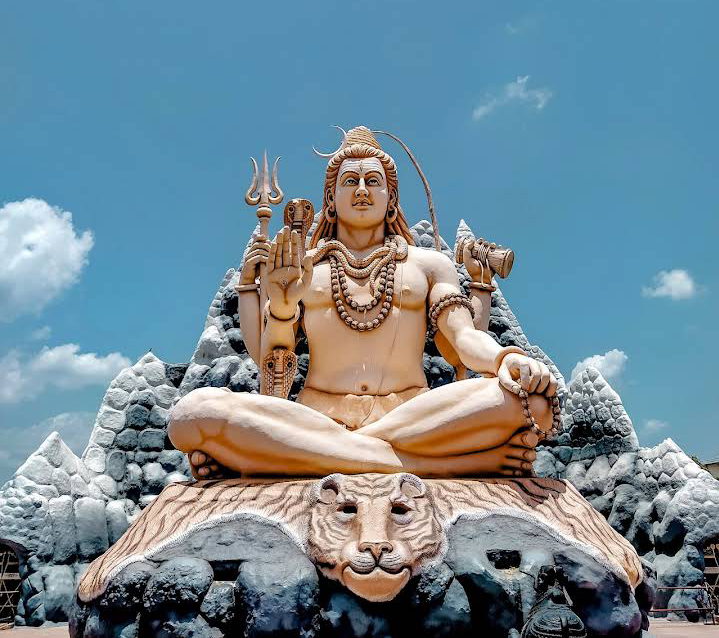
Shiv Shakti Dham

Notable sites in Sagar district include:

- Lakha Banjara Lake, lake, ghats and temple
- Eran, historical place known for Gupta period records
- Rahatgarh Waterfall
- Dhamoni, known for forts, tombs and fair
- Dr. Bhimrao Ambedkar Wildlife Sanctuary, wildlife sanctuary
- Nauradehi Wildlife Sanctuary, natural wildlife Sanctuary
- Harsiddhi Devi Mandir, Rangir, Devi temple
- Rahatgarh Fort, historical fort and monument
- Khimlasa, historic place and fort
- Garhpehra, Hanuman temple and forts
- Aabchand, ancient caves and rock shelters

== Notable people ==
- Gopal Bhargava, Indian politician
- Sir Hari Singh Gour – founder of Dr. Hari Singh Gour University, a lawyer, jurist, educationalist, social reformer, writer and member of the Constitutional Assembly
- Pannalal Jain, Indian Jain scholar (1911–2001)
- Virendra Kumar Khatik – Indian politician
- Kshamasagar – Jain Saint and Bhikshu
- Govind Namdev – director
- Kavi Padmakar, A Ritikal Poet
- Vitthalbhai Patel – poet, lyricist, former government minister, and social worker.
- Nathuram Premi (1881–1960) – writer, publisher, poet, editor, linguist and intellectual in the field of Jainism and Hindi literature; born in the city of Deori
- Govind Singh Rajput – Indian politician
- Vijaya Raje Scindia – (1919 – 2001), consort of the last ruling Maharaja of Gwalior, and later a politician elected to both houses of the Indian parliament. Bborn in Sagar.
- Ravishankar Shukla (2 August 1877 – 31 December 1956) – born in Sagar, first Chief Minister of Madhya Pradesh state.
- Bhupendra Singh – Indian politician
- Mukesh Tiwari – actor
- Ramkumar Verma – Indian Poet
- Harsh Yadav – Indian politician
- Laxmi Narayan Yadav – Indian politician

== See also ==
- Karrapur
- Lajpatpura
- Makronia
