= Bhadreswar =

Bhadreswar may refer to:

- Bhadreswar, Hooghly, a town in Hooghly district, West Bengal, India
- Bhadreswar, Kutch, a village in Kutch district, Gujarat, India
