= Ashok Jadeja =

Ashok Jadeja (born 1 June 1974), popularly known as Ashok Maadi and Mataji Ashok, is a self-proclaimed 'Godman', who has been accused of swindling money from thousands of people from across India by claiming to have the divine blessings of a goddess of a local caste in Ahmedabad.

== Method ==
Jadeja would sit outside the Shikoter Mataji temple in Ahmedabad and tell people that if they kept their money with him, the goddess would make them wealthy. His initial targets were women known to be followers of the goddess Vahanwati Sikotar Mataji. Claiming divine powers, he would invite them to participate in religious rituals and then lure them into contributing whatever they could. In order to gain his target's confidence, Jadeja would initially pay back three times the amount given to him. Reports initially suggested he accumulated more than twenty crore in three States of India with the help of approximately thirty-five accomplices. This amount changed to thousands of crores which was given to accomplices and used to purchase gold and real estate investments in Gujarat and neighboring areas.

== Arrest and aftermath ==
He was arrested on 31 May 2009 with his wife Neeta and Rs.19.8 million. On 3 June 2009, ten relatives were apprehended by police from the Kunwara village in the Patan district of North Gujarat for their alleged involvement with his scheme.

On 10 June 2009, a local court in Gujarat granted the criminal investigation department permission to conduct a narco test on Jadeja. Police officials from neighboring Rajasthan, Maharashtra and other parts of the country came to Gujarat to interrogate him and his associates. On 24 July 2009, Jadeja admitted that he had no godly or mystical powers. In addition, he also revealed that some policemen and bootleggers had also benefited from his "money-multiplying scheme". He stated that he personally earned Rs. 200 million and that many others had made more than him. Restoration of the funds to the victims is unlikely.

In 2012, his petition to the Ahmedabad High Court to hold a single trial for his 74 cases was rejected.
