= Shrine of Lal Shahbaz Qalandar =

Sufi shrine and mausoleum in Sindh, Pakistan

- لال شہباز قلندر مزار
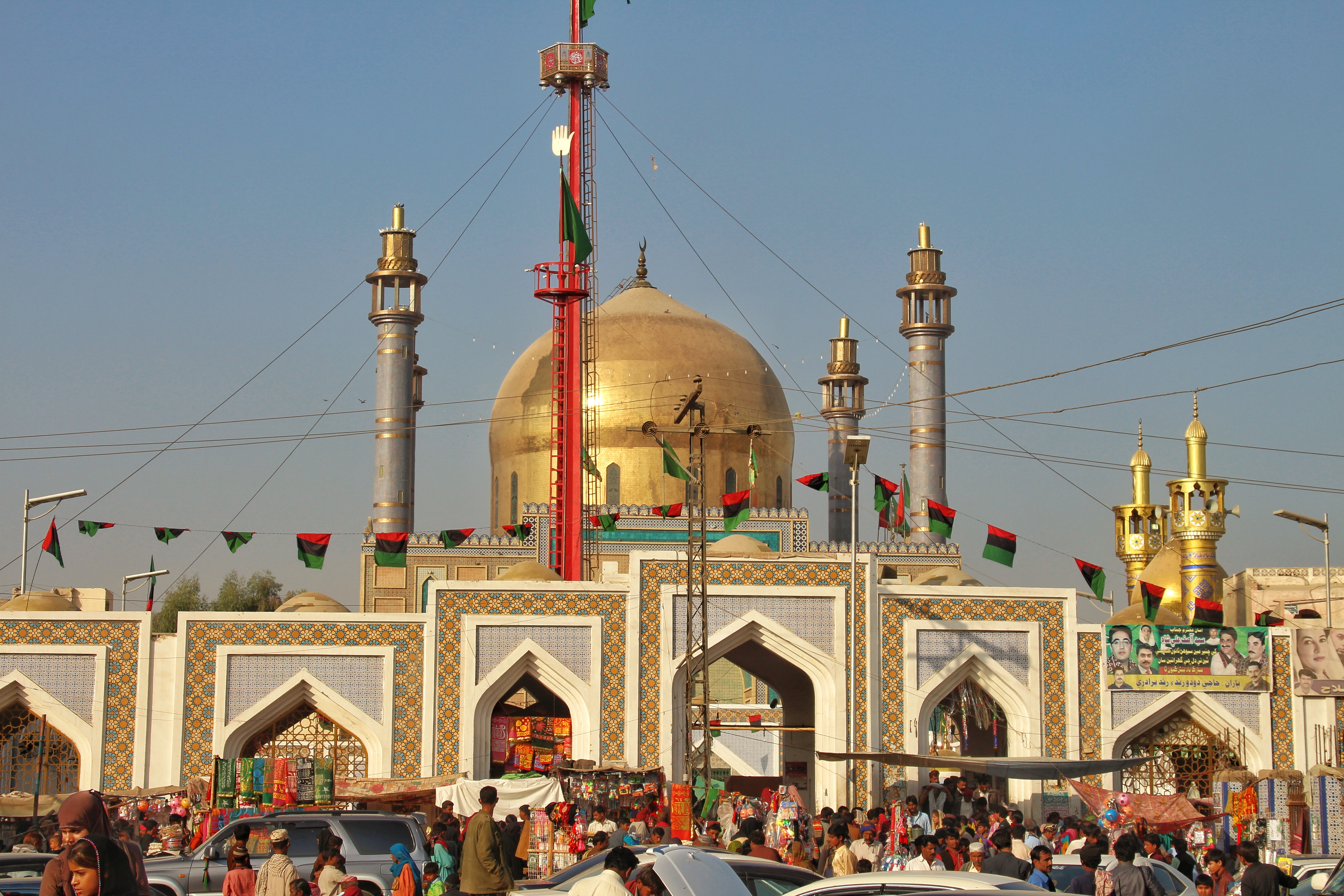
- The shrine of Lal Shahbaz Qalandar is one of Pakistan's most important Sufi shrines.

- Location within Sindh Location within Pakistan

Religion
- Affiliation: Islam
- District: Jamshoro
- Province: Sindh
- Year consecrated: 1356 C.E.

Location
- Location: Sehwan Sharif
- Country: Pakistan
- Coordinates: 26.4193143°N 67.8593731°E

Architecture
- Type: Mosque and Sufi mausoleum
- Style: Perso-Islamic

Specifications
- Dome: 1
- Dome height (outer): 110 feet
- Dome dia. (outer): 56 feet
- Minaret: 4

The Shrine of Lal Shahbaz Qalandar (Urdu: لال شہباز قلندر مزار; Sindhi: لال شهباز قلندر جي مزار) is a shrine and mausoleum dedicated to the 13th century Muslim Sufi saint, Lal Shahbaz Qalandar. The shrine is located in Sehwan, in the Pakistani province of Sindh. The shrine is one of the most important in Pakistan, and attracts up to one million visitors annually.

== History ==
The shrine's construction was started under the reign of Firuz Shah Tughlaq, who ordered that the saint's remains be enshrined in Sehwan Sharif. The tomb complex was built in 1356 CE, though it has been expanded several times since its founding. Ibn Battuta mentions the shrine during his travels to the region in the mid-14th century. In 1639, the shrine was greatly expanded under the rule of Mirza Jani Beg Tarkhan of the Tarkhan dynasty. Though the shrine was founded centuries ago, its popularity expanded in the late 20th century.

On 16 February 2017, the Islamic State of Iraq and the Levant – Khorasan Province claimed responsibility for a suicide attack at the shrine that resulted in the deaths of 88 people. The following morning, the shrine's caretaker continued the daily tradition of ringing the shrine's bell at 3:30am, and defiantly vowed that he would not be intimidated by terrorists. The shrine's dhamaal, or meditative dancing ceremony, was resumed the very next evening following the attack. A few days later, several leading Pakistani artists and performers partook in a dhamaal at the shrine as a defiant response to radical Islamists. Another dhamaal session was held to mark the one year anniversary of the bombing, and was organised by Pakistani social activist Sheema Kermani.

== Building ==
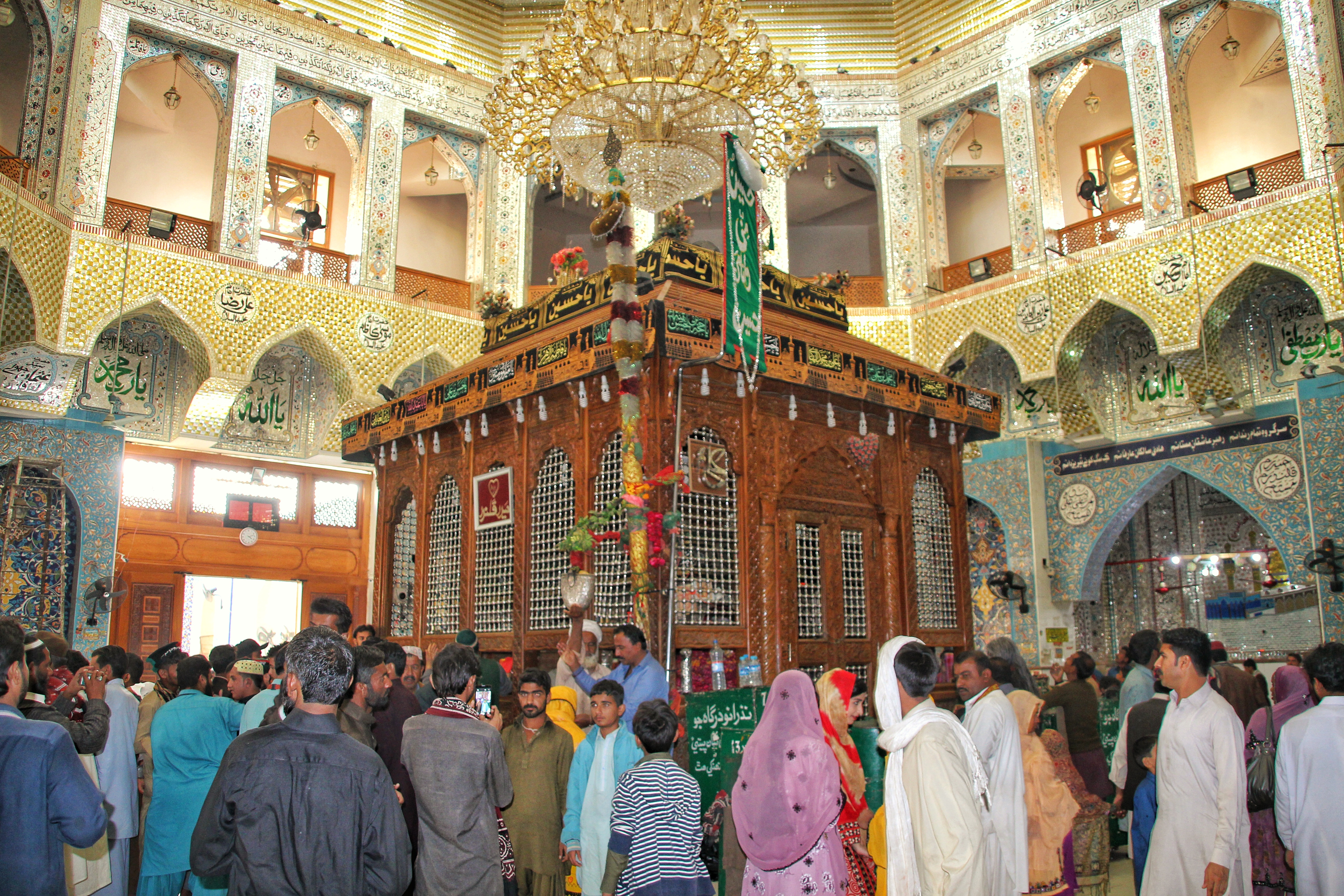
Interior view of the shrine

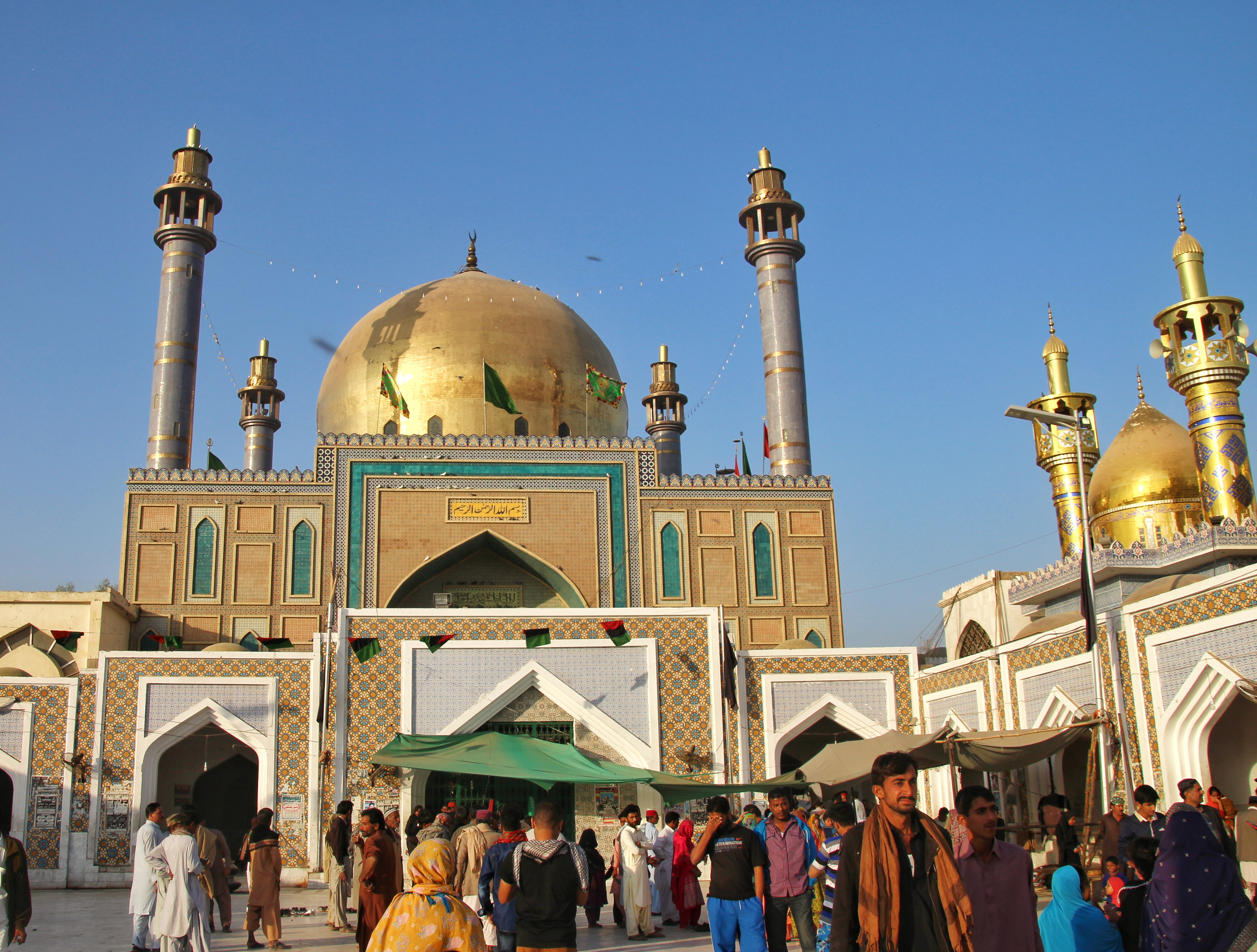
The shrine's gilded dome was replaced in 1994.

The original shrine was built in 1356, but was subsequently upgraded. The completed portions are now extensively covered in white marble, glazed tiles, and mirror work. The shrine's gold-plated main door was donated by the last Shah of Iran, Mohammad Reza Pahlavi, in the 1970s. The saint's tomb is located under the shrine's central dome, with some illumination provided by small earthen oil lamps similar to those used in Hindu ceremonies.

Much of the shrine was to be rebuilt on the orders of Prime Minister Benazir Bhutto after portions of the central dome collapsed in 1994. A new gilded dome was completed, while the shrine's dhamaal courtyard was also built at this time. The dome's height is 110 feet, while its diameter is 56 feet. The dome's outer surface is gilded with gold-plated tiles from the United Arab Emirates, while the interior surface is decorated with tile from Iran.

A Sunni and Shia mosque were to also have been constructed at the shrine as part of Bhutto's renovation plans. A shopping centre, new lavatories, and a resting place for travelers were also to have been built. A CCTV-camera system was also to have been deployed in a 4 kilometre radius around the shrine, though most of the cameras were eventually stolen after being delivered to local police in 2011, with the theft remaining unreported to higher authorities for several months.

== Significance ==
The shrine is one of Pakistan's most revered, and attracts up to one million visitors annually. Women are also allowed a greater degree of social freedom around the shrine.

It has figured in the 1 Pakistani rupee coin.

=== Sufis ===
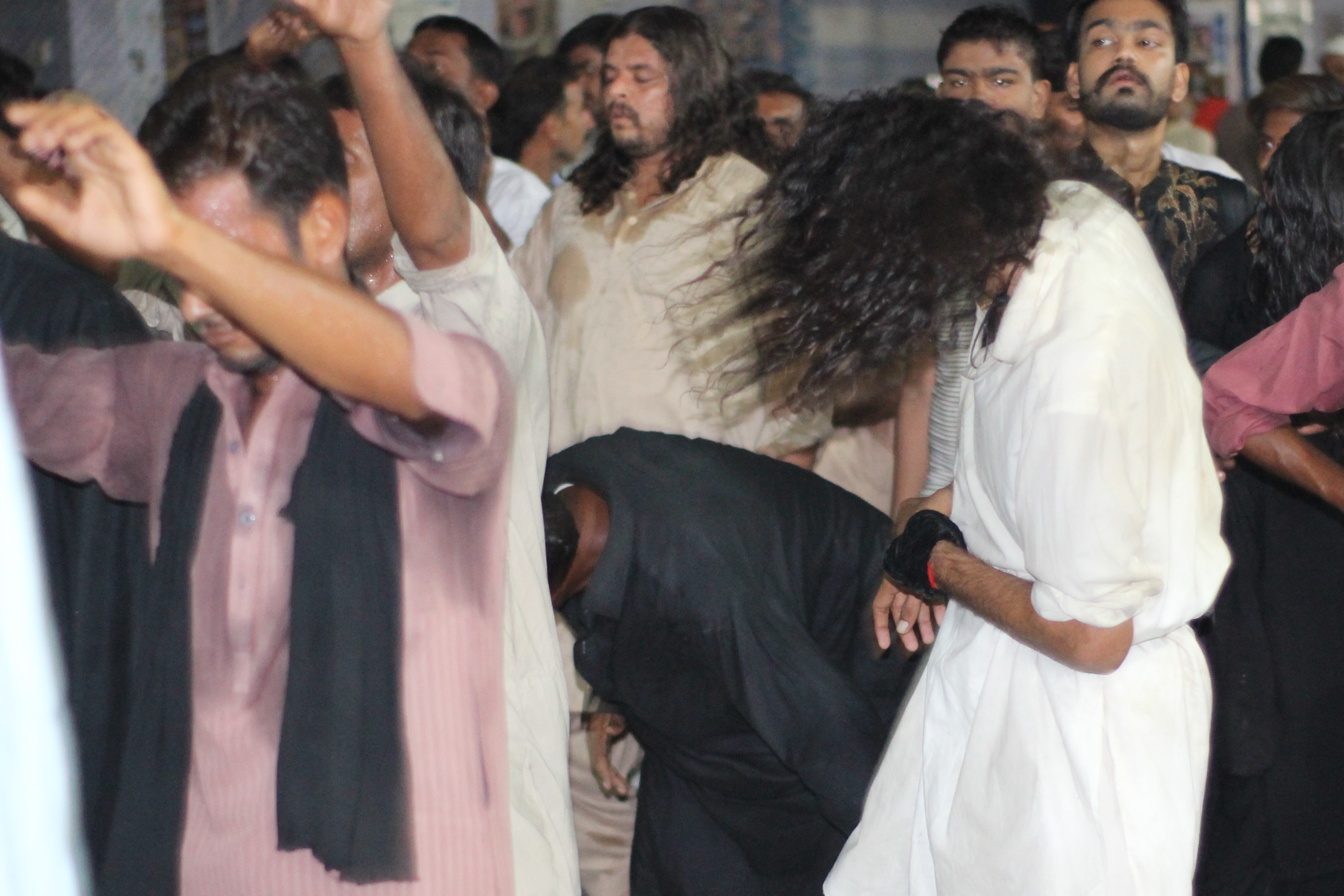
Dhamaal, or meditative dancing sessions, are held at the shrine during which participants enter a trance-like state to the tune of rapid drum beats.

The shrine is considered to be the chief shrine for malangs and qalandars who follow the teachings of Lal Shahbaz Qalandar. The matted hair and torn clothing of the malangs may be influenced by Hindu Shaivite yogis, as Sehwan Sharif was a stronghold of the Shaivite Hindu tradition prior to the Partition of British India.

The shrine also holds dhamaal ceremonies, or dancing sessions accompanied by rhythmic drum-beating to induce a trance-like meditative state, that are believed to have been performed by Lal Shahbaz Qalandar. Men and women both participate in the dhamaal, though in portions of the shrine's courtyard that are roped off for use by each gender. The February 2017 bombing at the shrine was detonated during the dhamaal ceremony.

Women known as muridiānī offer water to devotees at the shrine, while female devotees also hold up glasses towards Lal Shahbaz Qalandar's guluband necklace hanging at the shrine in order to seek blessings before passing the water to other devotees for consumption.

=== Hindus ===
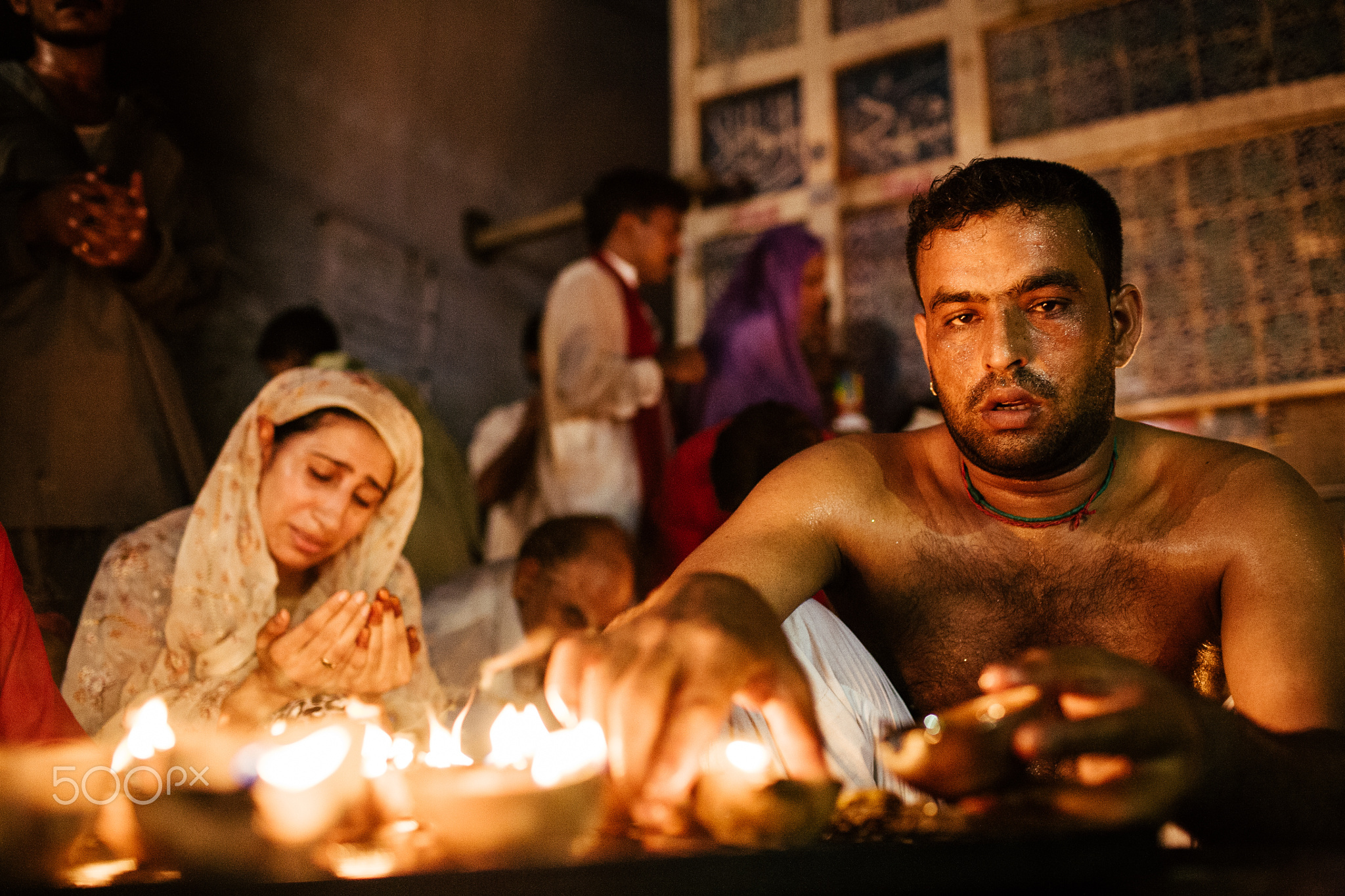
The shrine attracts both Muslim and Hindu devotees.

The shrine attracts Hindu devotees, while one of the shrine's two sajjada nasheens, or hereditary guardian-families, is a Hindu family. Hindus still perform the mehndi ritual at the opening of the shrine's annual urs, or fair.

During his lifetime, Lal Shahabaz Qalandar sang songs in Sindhi dedicated to Jhulelal, avatar of Lord Varuna. Until the 19th century, Hindus as well as Muslims believed that the flow of the nearby Indus River waxed and waned according to the whim of the Lal Shahbaz Qalandar. The name of the Sindhi Hindu God of water, Jhulelal, is displayed prominently in the shrine. Another belief is that Lal Shahbaz Qalandar is an incarnation of Shaivite sage Bhartrihari. This is documented by British administrator C. A Kincaid in Folk tales of Sind and Guzarat, 1925. According to the legend, Vikramaditya once set out in disguise to observe the administration of his kingdom, appointing his younger brother Bhartrihari as regent during his absence. Around this time, the goddess Parvati is said to have bestowed upon a devout elderly couple a miraculous fruit that granted immortality to whoever consumed it. Choosing material wealth over eternal life, the couple sold the fruit to Bhartrihari for a substantial sum. Bhartrihari, in turn, gifted the fruit to his youngest and most favored queen. However, she passed it on to her lover, who then presented it to a courtesan. The courtesan eventually sold the fruit back to Bhartrihari, thereby revealing the queen’s infidelity. Disillusioned and angered, Bhartrihari renounced his royal duties, discarded the fruit, and embraced the life of an ascetic. The legend continues that Bhartrihari wandered westward and eventually settled in the region of Sindh, where he became a devout follower of Shiva. He named his place of residence “Shivisthan” (meaning “abode of Shiva”), a name believed to have evolved into Sehwan Sharif. Bhartrihari is said to have lived there until his death, and his ascetic life contributed to the sanctification of the site. In later centuries, following the decline of earlier Hindu establishments due to Muslim invasions, the memory of Bhartrihari persisted in local tradition. When the Sufi saint Lal Shahbaz Qalandar established himself at the same location and became associated with miracles, many Hindus came to regard him as a reincarnation of Bhartrihari. This belief contributed to the continued reverence of the site across religious communities and veneration of him by Hindus.

Historian and Anthropologist Michel Boivin writes that the term Jhulelal was used by Sindhi Hindus to worship Jhulelal. The term was later used by Sufi Muslims in the song Dama Dam Mast Qalandar. After the popularity of the song Lal Shahbaz Qalandar is often referred to as Jhulelal or Jhulelal Qalandar.

=== Cultural ===
The qawwali song Dama Dam Mast Qalandar is famous throughout South Asia, and is in praise of the Sufi saint who is interred at the shrine. Zulfiqar Ali Bhutto, the former Prime Minister of Pakistan, frequented the shrine and is said to have identified with Lal Shahbaz Qalandar, and used his frequent visits to the shrine to portray himself as part of Sindh's cultural traditions. The song Dama Dam Mast Qalandar was commonly played during his campaign rallies and became an unofficial anthem for the Pakistan People's Party.

The shrine also attracts roving minstrels of impoverished gypsy women, known as chāi-vālī or lotevālī, who sing devotional songs at the shrine in return for meagre alms. The practice of female minstrel groups is unique to the shrine and is not found elsewhere in Sindh. Some gypsy singers at the shrine have evolved into sought-after musicians in nearby Hyderabad. Taj Mastani was a former member of a minstrel group, and began performing at concerts within Pakistan, as well as for the Pakistani diaspora abroad. The Pakistani folk-singer Reshma in the 1960s gained international fame for singing a Saraiki version of the song Dama Dam Mast Qalandar at the shrine, though she was neither gypsy nor part of a roving minstrel group.

=== Dhammal ===
Dhamaal is a mystical dance of Sindh which is mainly performed by faqirs, dervishs, sufi saints and devotees. The Dhammal of Hazrat Lal Shahbaz Qalandar is quite famous. The main performers would wear all red color Jama and Sindhi Patko (turban), the red is the color of Lal Shahbaz Qalandar, which was the favorite color of him, he wore the attire of red color as well, hence the name "Lal" has been given to him which means "Red". Dhammal is characterized by religious fervor. Nagaro, Nobat, Gharyal, Ghugoo instruments etc provide the beat and tempo for the dance.

== Annual Urs festival ==
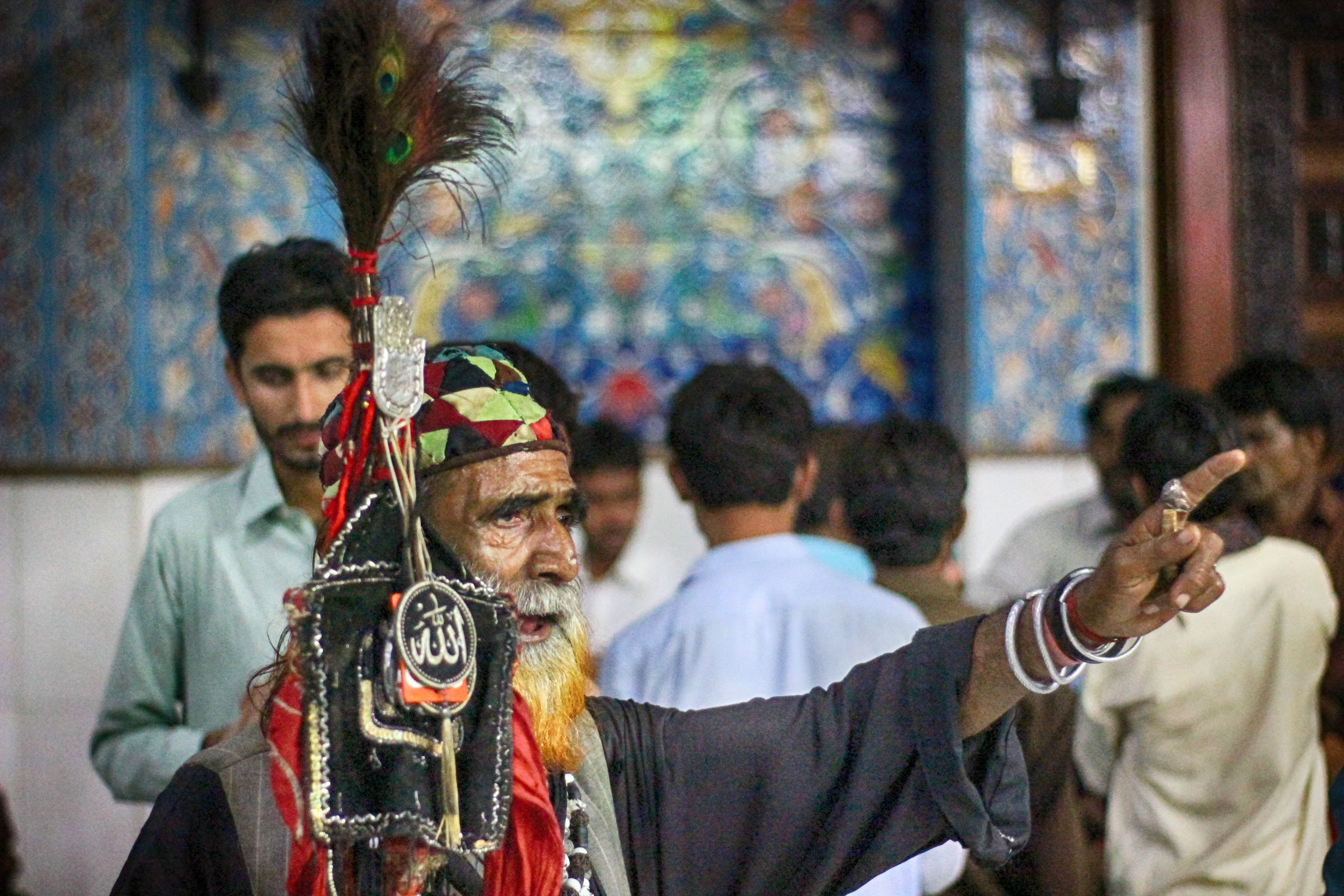
The shrine attracts wandering Sufi mystics known as malangs.

An annual Urs, or celebration of the saint's death-anniversary, is held on the 18 Sha'aban – the eighth month of the Muslim lunar calendar. The 764th urs was celebrated in May 2016. The annual fair has become increasingly popular, and now attracts more than half a million pilgrims from all over Pakistan. Visitors and performers also sometimes join Jhulelal sangat groups, and travel to the shrine together in a qafilah, or caravan. Visitors offer tributes, and ask for the saint's intercession on their behalf.

The festivities also include entertainment events. Bands of folk-singers, known as mandali, are invited from various regions in Pakistan each year. Malakhro, or Sindhi-style wrestling, is also on display during the annual festival. Dhamaal sessions are also conducted on the shrine's premises during the fair, while cannabis consumption is also common during festivities.

== Shrine of Ibrahim ==
The Shrine of Ibrahim in Bhadresar in the Indian state of Gujarat is believed by some locals there to be the resting place of Lal Shahbaz, although this attribution is considered to be traditional rather than historical.

== Gallery ==
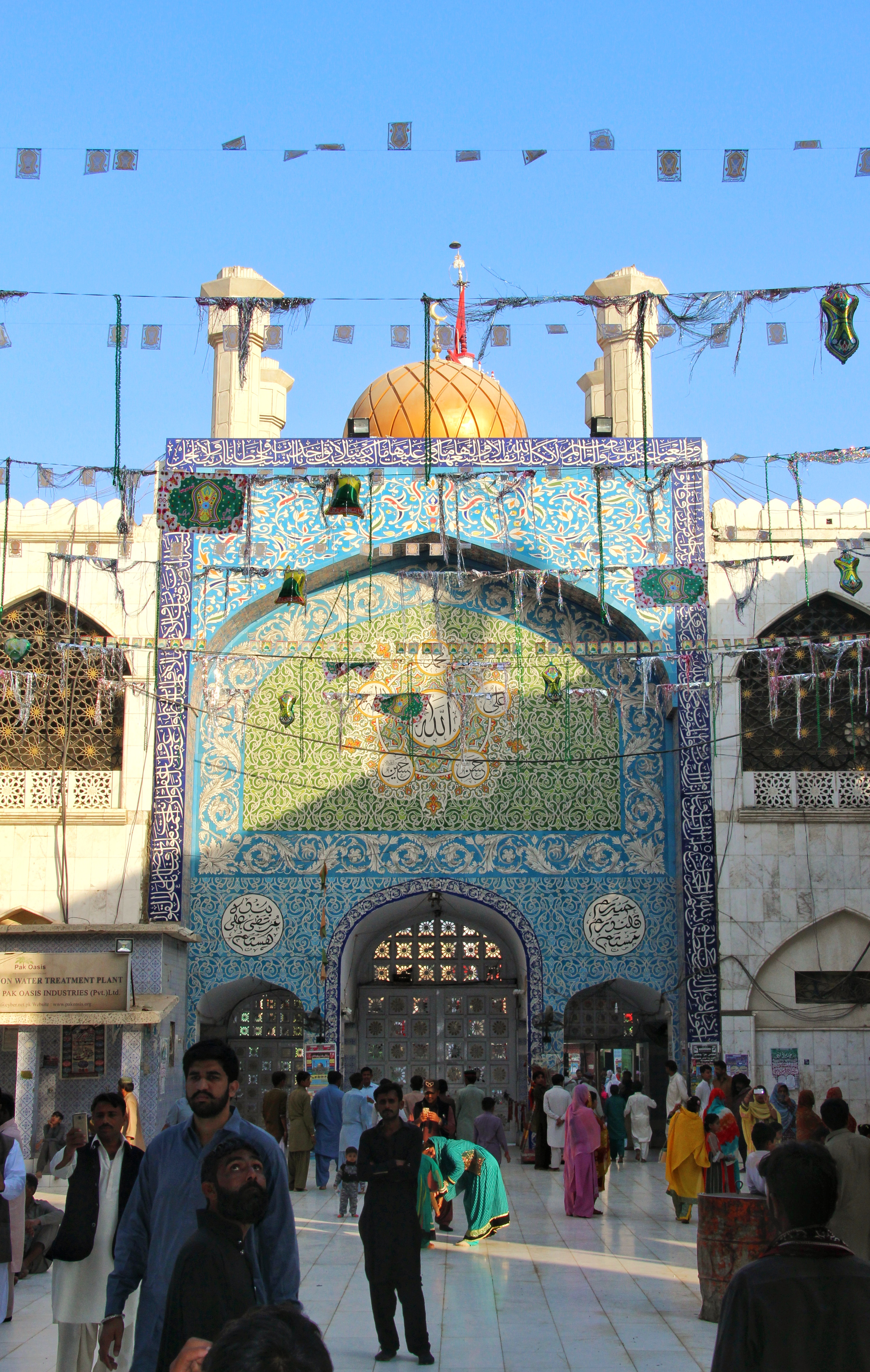
Gateway to the shrine complex

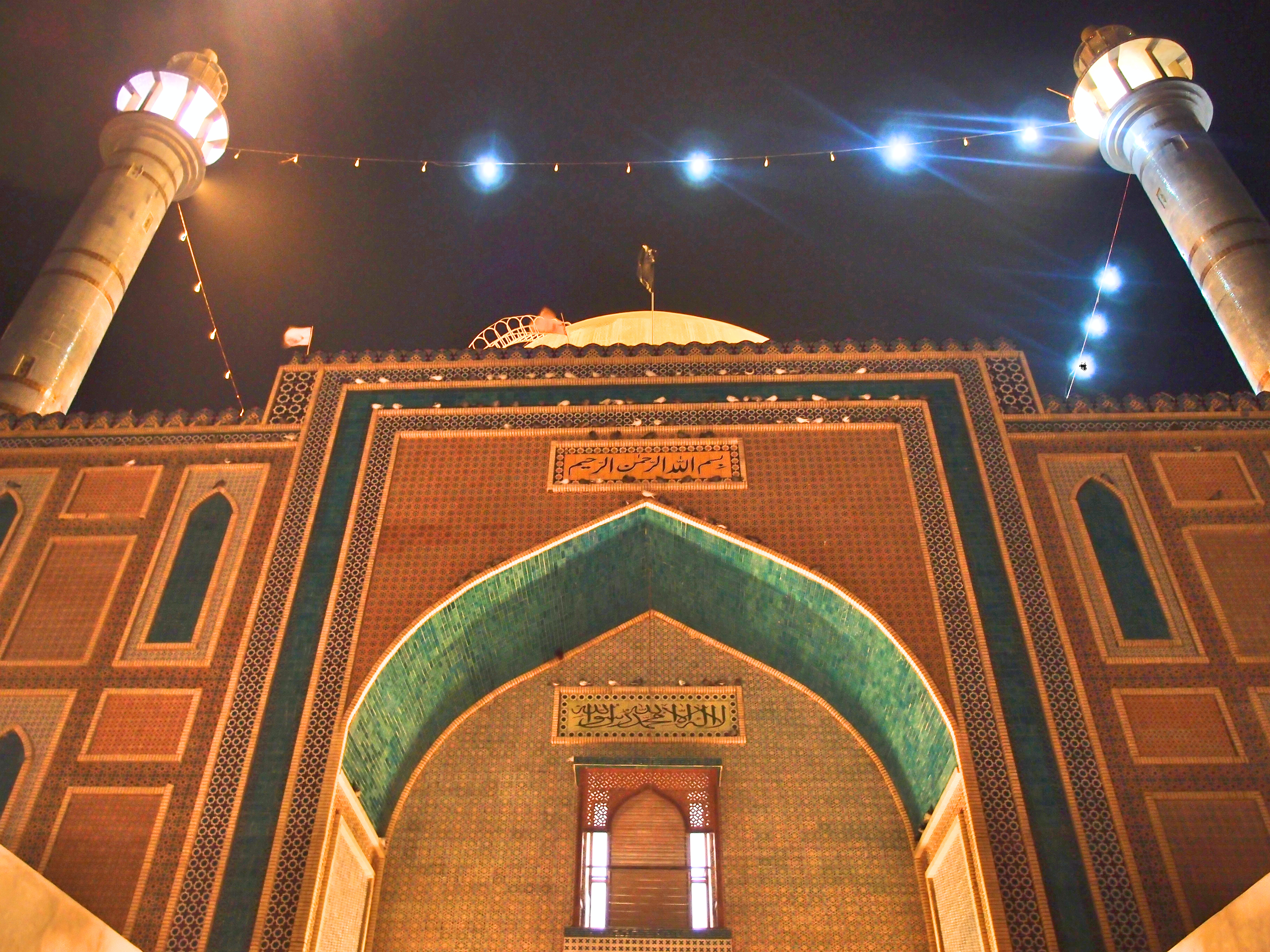
The shrine at night

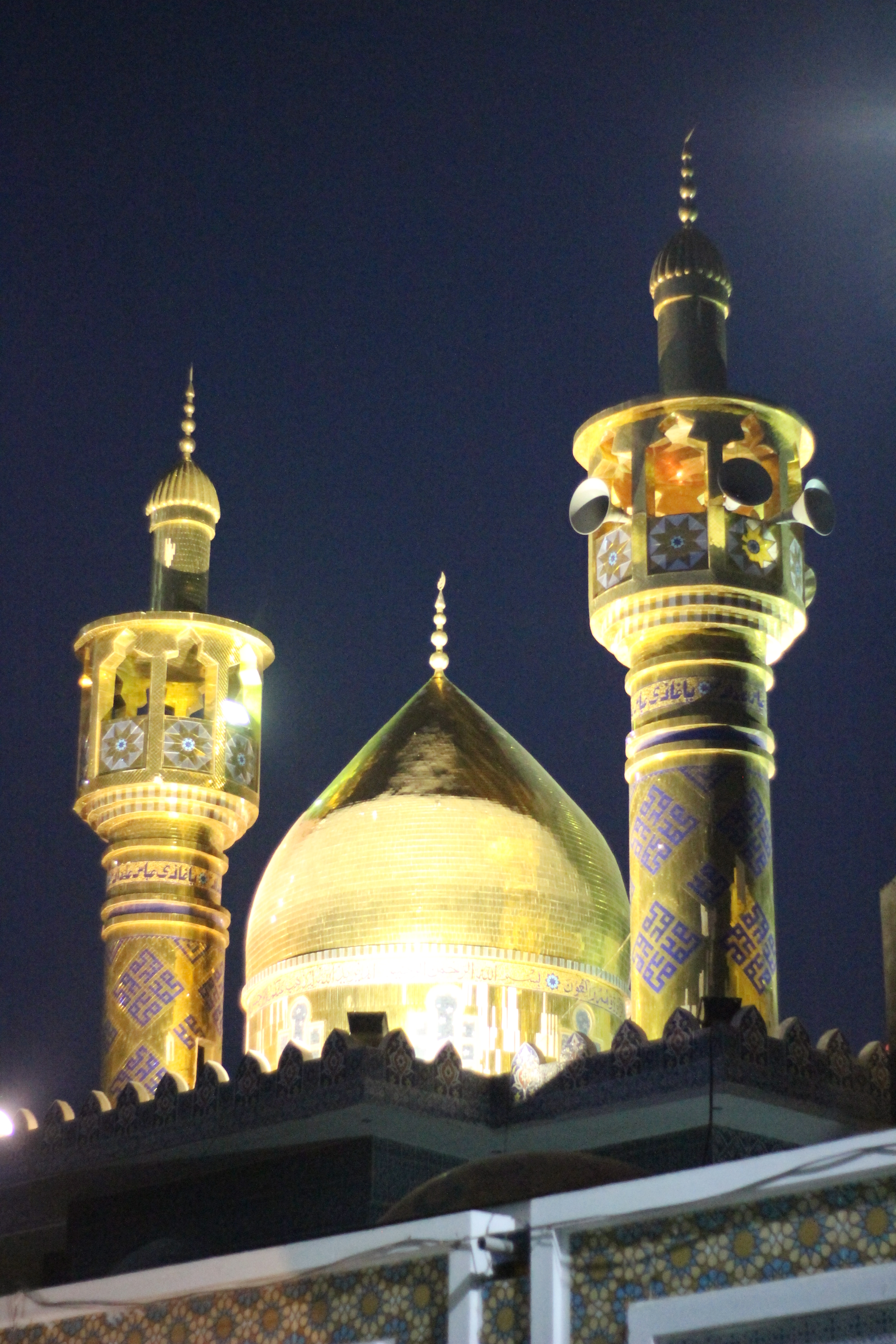
Portions of the shrine complex resemble prominent Shia shrines in the Iraqi cities of Najaf and Karbala.

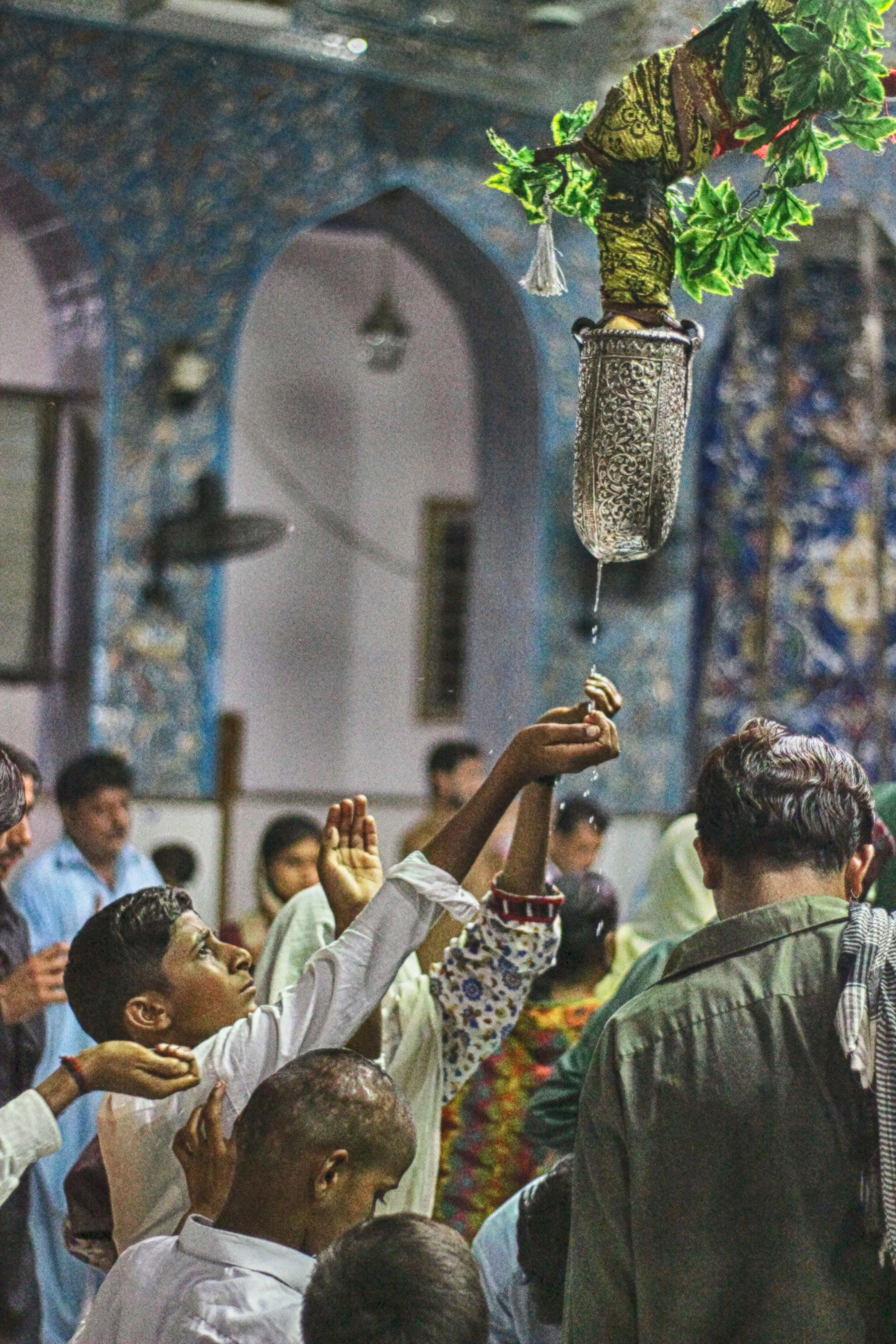
Devotees regard water at the site to be blessed.

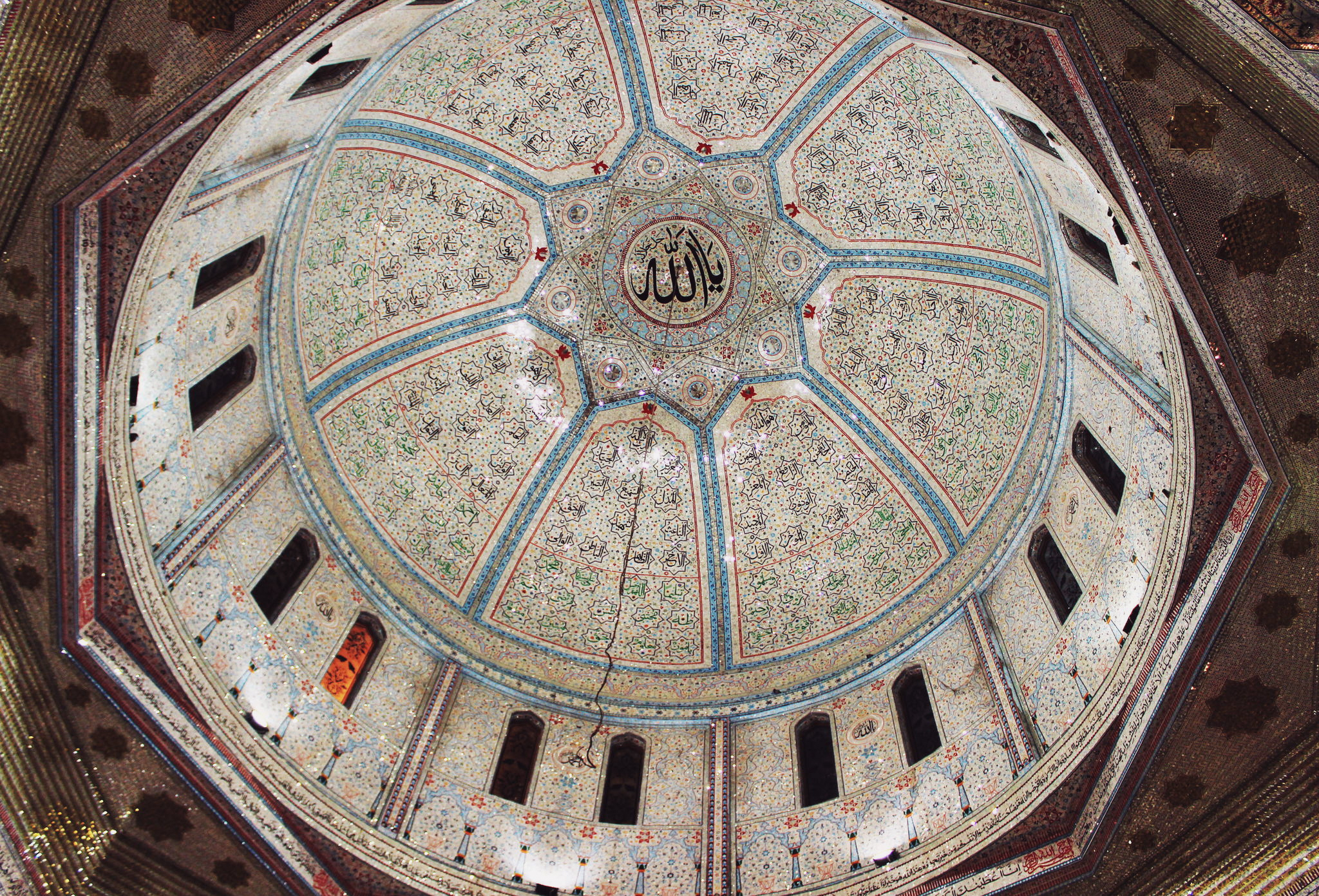
View of the central dome's underside

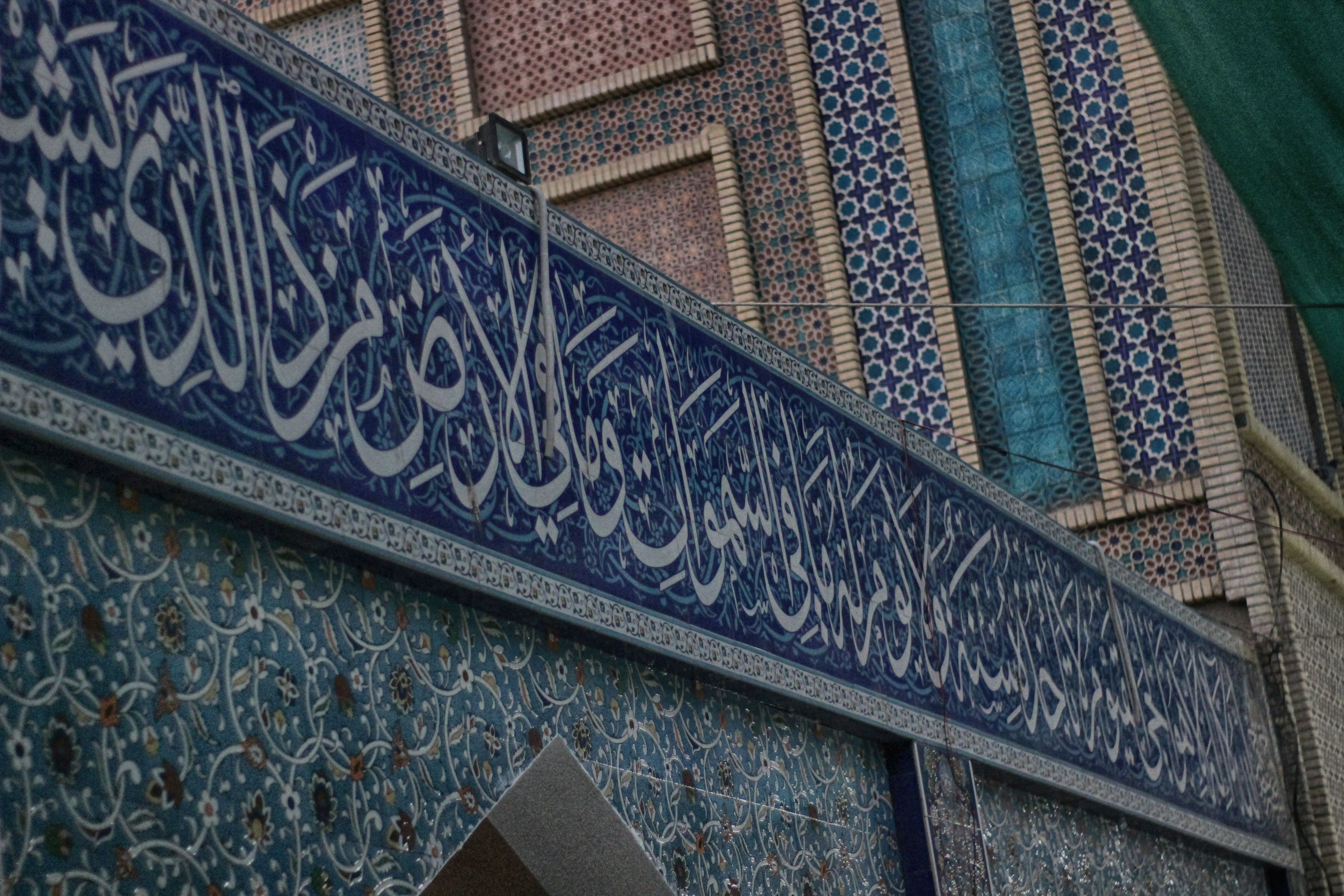
The shrine's exterior features Sindhi-style tilework.

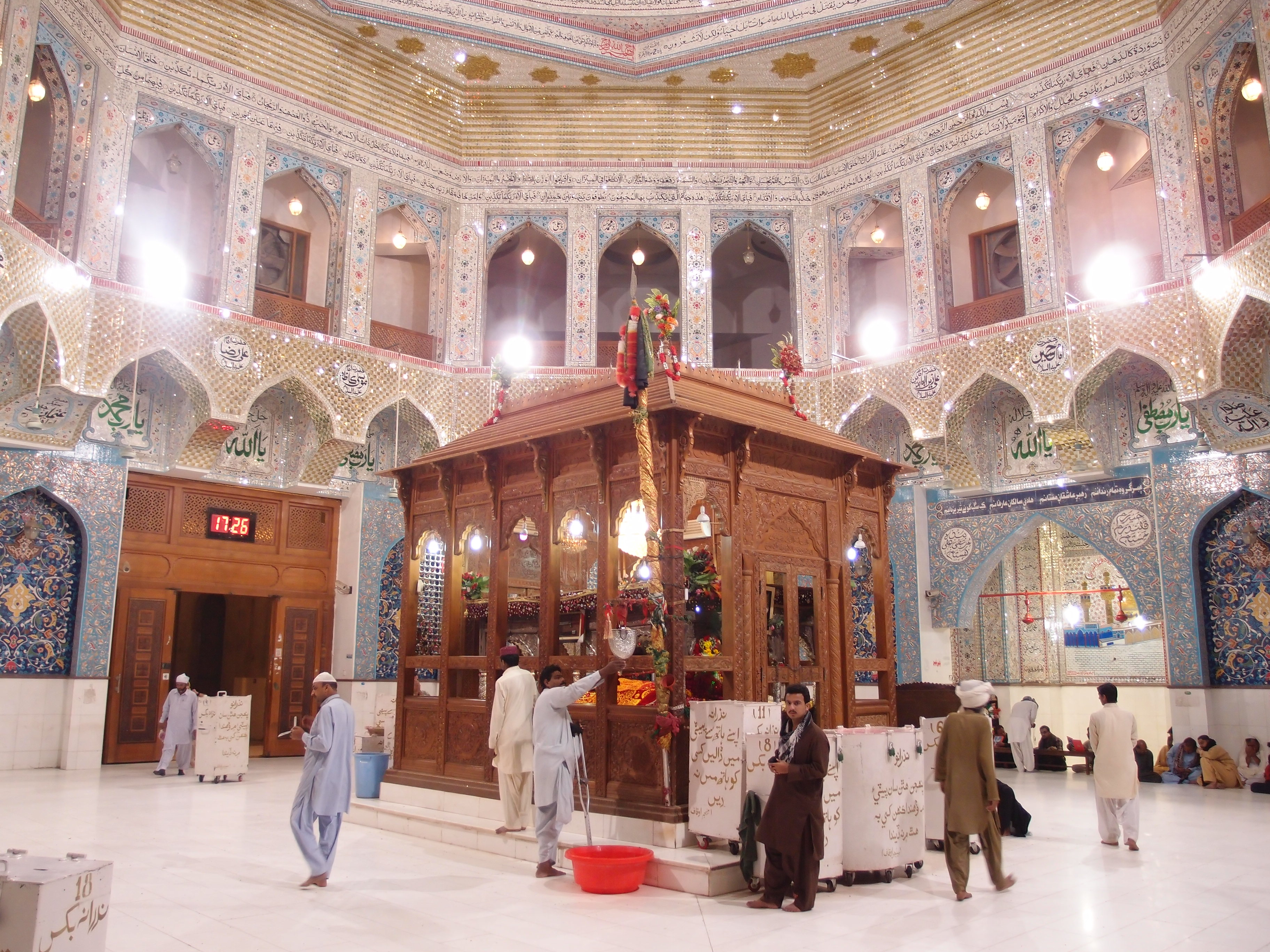
Interior of the shrine

== See also ==
- Shrine of Shah Abdul Latif Bhittai
- List of mausolea and shrines in Pakistan
- Sufism in Sindh
- Sufism in Pakistan
