= Jagadu =

- Born: Bhadreswar, Kutch
- Known for: Business
- Predecessor: Solaka
- Successor: Champsi
- Spouse: Yashomati
- Parents: Solaka (father); Sri (mother)

Jagadu (IAST:Jagaḍu), also called Jagadu Shah, Jagdusha or Jagadeva, was a thirteenth century Jain merchant from Bhadreshwar, Kutch (Kachchh) (now in Gujarat, India).

== Source of information ==
The Jagaducharita, the thirteenth century verse biography by Sarvananda Suri, chiefly deals with episodes from the life of Jagadu and his philanthropy. It deals with a life of a merchant, not any kings. Though the biography is not historically accurate and eulogies Jagadu, it is good sources of information about trade and influence of traders of that era. Other sources include Upadesha Tarangini by Ratnamandiragani.

== Ancestors ==
Viyatthu was a Shrimali Jain who are originated from Shrimal in southern Marwad (now Bhinmal, Rajasthan). Shrimalis are also mentioned in some 11th-century inscriptions. His son Varanaga lived in Kanthkot in eastern Kutch then under Chaulukya rule. Varanaga's grandson was Visala. Visala's son Solaka or Solasha moved from Mandvi to Bhadreshwar with his wife Sri. They had three sons; Jagadu, Raja and Padma.

== Biography ==
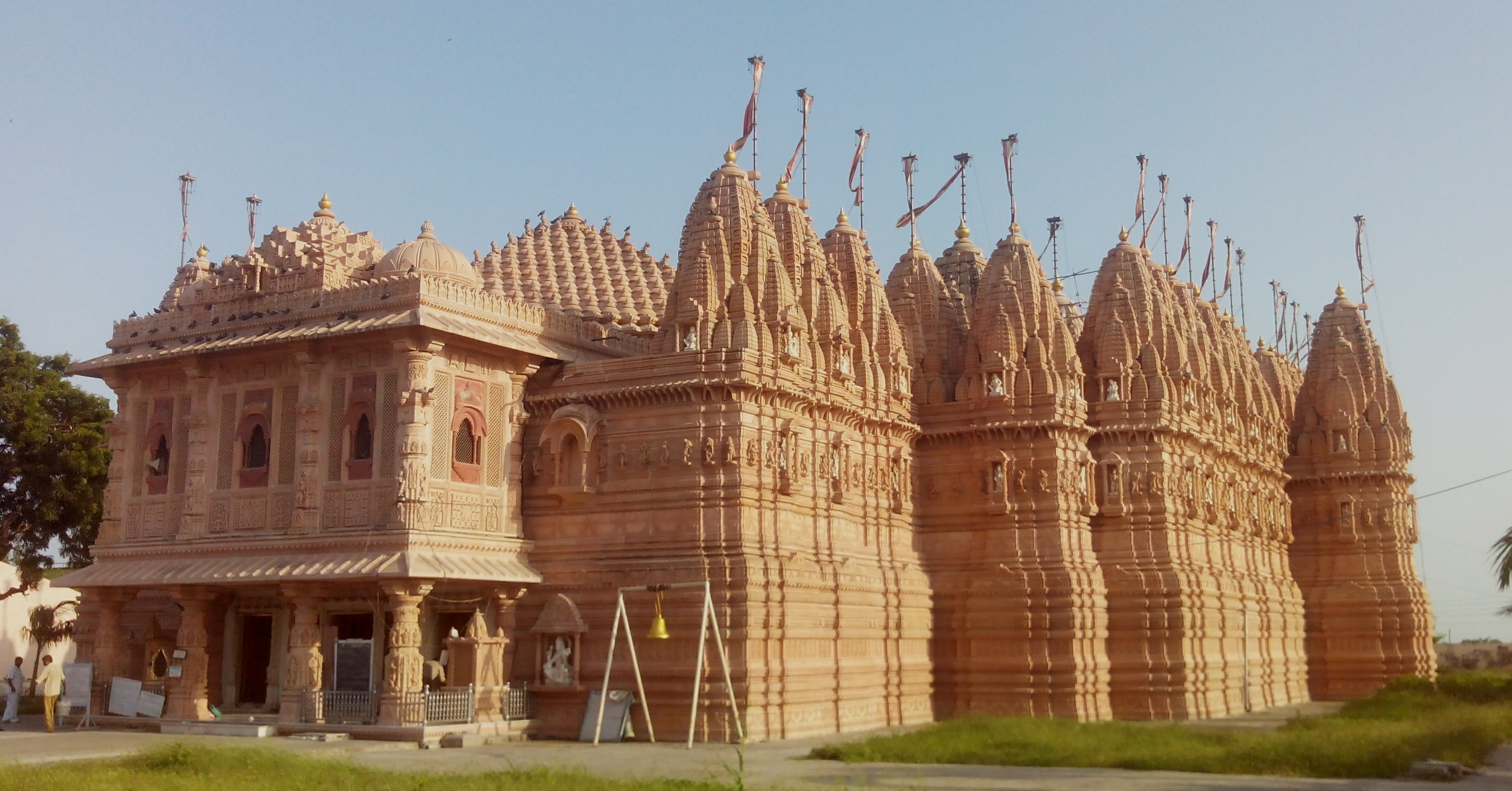
Vasai Jain Temple, Bhadreshwar. Rebuilt after old temple was destroyed in 2001 Gujarat earthquake.

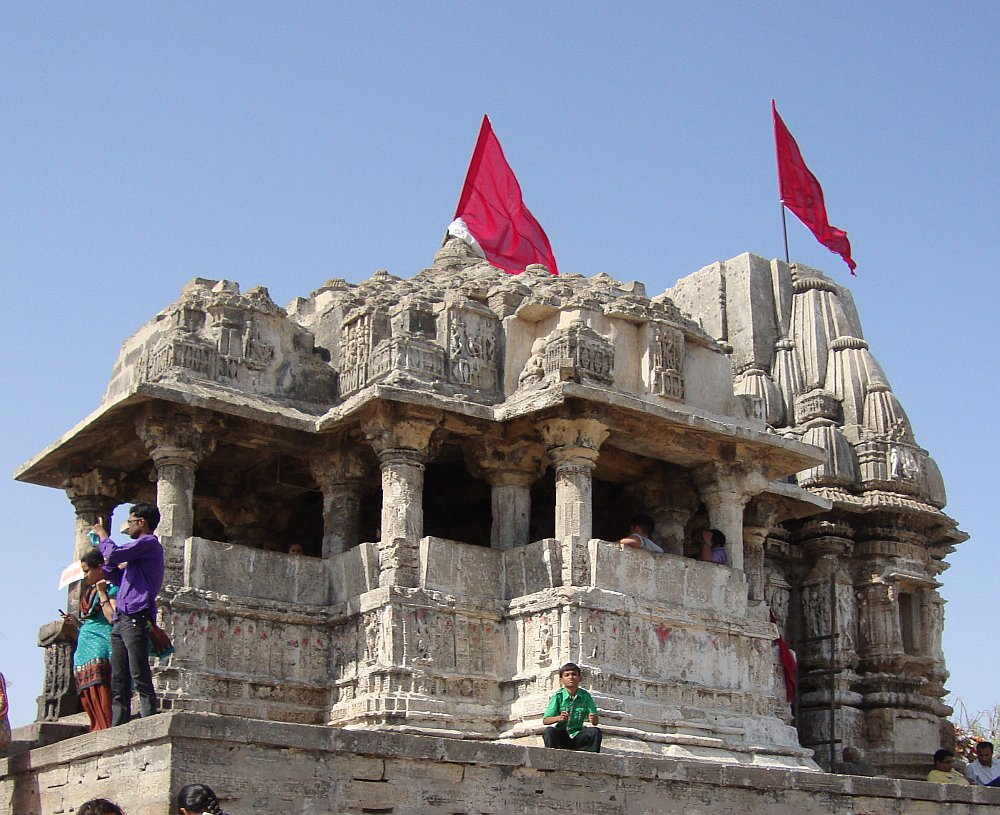
The old Goddess Harshad Temple on Koyal hill is accredited to Jagadu.

After death of his father, Jagadu inherited business and became undertook responsibility of his family. He married Yashomati and also got his brothers married.

Several legends attribute his wealth to magical events. In one legend, he was given a magical object by a shepherd which made him rich and so his philanthropic activities expanded. As Jagadu had no child, his wife advised him to pray to gods. The god of ocean had granted him boon that though he will not have children, his ships will always reach ports safely. Another legend explains that one of his assistant Jayantsimha of Upakesha lineage had acquired a stone during his stay for trading at Hormuz in the Persian Gulf. A Shaivaite Yogi told Jagadu to split open it and so he found jewels when he split it.

He owned many ships, which he used to travel west to Persia, Arabia and Africa. He traded mainly in grains, cotton and spices. He had a vast maritime trade empire.

He was involved in some political conflicts too and saved his town. Pithadeva, probably the Soomra chief of Para invaded Kutch and destroyed the town wall of Bhadreshwar. Jagadu started rebuilding the walls so he was warned by messenger from Pithadeva. The messenger had told, "When two horns grow on the head of an ass, then thou will erect here a town wall!" He refused to stop rebuilding and visited Lavanaprasada, the Vaghela general at Anhilwad Patan under Bhima II of Chaulukya dynasty. He asked for help and he received an army from him and Pithadeva had to retreat to Para. Jagadu completed building the town wall and sent Pithadeva an obscene statue of his mother and an ass with golden horns. This also won him approval of Samma Jam, a Samma chief of Sindh and opponent of Pithadeva. Samma Jam sent gifts to Jagadu.

He invited the Jain teachers to town. Following advise of his teacher Paramdeva Suri of the Purnima Gaccha, he also led pilgrimages of Jain community to Jain holy sites such as Shatrunjaya and Girnar after taking permission of new Vaghela chief Visaladeva. After returning, he built and renovated several Jain temples and consecrated images. He is also accredited to have rebuilt and repaired the historic Vasai Jain temple at Bhadreshwar. His some notable constructions between 1250 and 1270 CE are Rishabha temple at Dhanka, a temple with 24 devkulikas at Wadhwan, a temple on Shatrunjaya hill and a temple with 52 devakulika at Sevadi. He built wells, gardens, tanks, rest houses and a hospital. He had spent his fund to build some Hindu temples also and restored a Shaivaite temple. He had also built a masiti (a mosque) for Shimali or Khimli (identified as Ismailis) in Bhadreshwar for Muslim traders. There is still a mosque associated with Ismailis in Bhadreshwar and is considered as one of the earliest Islamic monument in India.

He is accredited for building a Hindu temple of goddess Harshad or Harsiddhi on Koyal hills near old port town of Miyani near Porbandar. His statue is also placed on the right side of the goddess in the temple. The legend associated with temple goes like this: The temple of goddess was on the hill overlooking the creek. It was believed that if the eyesight of goddess fell on the ship, it would be burnt or wrecked in the sea. The fleet of ships of Jagadu wrecked due to it but he was saved. Jagadu went to the temple and observed fast for three days to please the goddess. She appeared and Jagadu persuaded her to descend the hill so her eyes do not fall on ships. She agreed to acceded to his request if he would sacrifice a buffalo each step leading down the hill. Jagadu was perplexed as being follower of Jainism, he believed in non-violence. To keep his words, Jagadu brought buffaloes and sacrificed but the number fell short and the goddess was still few steps away from the new temple site. So he decided to sacrifice himself and his family. The goddess pleased for his devotion his family was brought back to life. She also granted boon that his line would not be extinguished.

A Jain monk Deva Suri, apprised Jagadu of a famine, which will strike after a few years and instructed him to store grains for such an event and spend his wealth for benefit of people. Jagadu stored large amount of grains. After two years of famine, the royal granaries were exhausted and the prices of grains rose to one dramma for thirteen grains of gram. Jagadu was summoned to court by Visaladeva and asked about his 'seven hundred well filled granaries'. Jagadu told that he had stored the grains for the poor and declared that if the people of starvation, it would his sin. He gave 8000 mutakas (measure) of grains to Visaladeva. He also supplied 12000 mutakas grains to Hammira, the ruler of Sindh; 18000 to king Madanavarmana of Avanti; 21000 to the Garjanesha Mojadina of Delhi; 32000 to Pratapasimha of Kashi and 12000 to king Skandhila. He also helped people by providing grains for three years from 1256 to 1258 CE (Vikram Samvat 1313 to 1315).

After famine ended, he was visited by Nagada, the minister of Visaladeva. Then the horses were precious commodity and they were imported from the Persian Gulf at the great cost, mostly for military use. One ship carrying horses shipwrecked near Bhadreshwar coast and only one horse survived and reached the coast. The horse had a paper attached to his neck with name of Jagadu on it. The horse was claimed by Nagada as a royal property which was contested by Jagadu and claimed as his own. It is a testimonial to his influence.

His biography ends with death of Jagadu. His funeral was attended by royals.

He had adopted a son. Champsi, a renowned merchant during reign of Mahmud Begada, was his descendant.

== Legacy ==
Jagadu is continued to be known for his philanthropy especially during the famine. Several Gujarati plays depicting events from his life are produced.

There is a shrine and memorial stone dedicated to him at Bardai Brahmin Dharmashala (rest house) in Jhundala near Porbandar. There is a ruined tower on the opposite bank of Aji River near Rajkot which is attributed to him. A locality in Ghatkopar suburb of Mumbai is named Jagadusha Nagar after him.
