= Shrine of Ibrahim =

Islamic shrine in India

Religion
- Affiliation: Islam

Location
- Location: Bhadresar
- State: Gujarat
- Country: India

The Shrine of Ibrahim, known locally as Lal Shahbaz Dargah, was built around 1160 in Bhadresar in Kutch district, Gujarat, India. It is one of the earliers extant Islamic monuments in India. The shrine is mistakenly attributed to Lal Shahbaz Qalandar, whose shrine is instead located in Pakistan.

== Shrine ==
The shrine, in a small walled enclosure, has a square pyramid shaped dome, round in the inside and supported on eight pillars set against the wall. The roof of the porch is flat is divided in 9×3 small squares, each with lotus flowers inside. Round the architrave, above the vine-ornamented wall-head course, there is a deep line of Arab inscription in large square Kufic characters, and on the right-end of the wall there are two lines of inscription. In the court some graves also have Kufic inscriptions. These epigraph constructed in 1160 marked the first use of Kufic script in India. According to an inscription in the monument, it is a shrine to Ibrahim.

== See also ==
- Abraham in Islam (Ibrahim)
