= Miyani =

Miyani / Miani Gujarati: મિયાણી
- Village
- Location within Gujarat Location within India
- Coordinates: 21.84015°N 69.38200°E
- Country: India
- State: Gujarat
- District: Porbandar

Language
  - Majority: Gujarati
- Time zone: IST

Miyani /Miani is a beach village in Porbandar Taluka in Porbandar, Gujarat, India. It is located 39 km north from the district headquarters of Porbandar and 429 km from the state capital of Gandhinagar.

Miyani is situated on a creek and is a fishing center in a fresh fish zone. It is located on the coastline of Gujarat with beaches on the Arabian Sea. It was ancient port.

== Religious significance ==
The village is a pilgrimage center for Hindus and Jains. Temples of the goddess Harsiddhi are located here, including an ancient temple on the mountain Koyla Dungar which overlooks the sea. The present temple is located in the foothills of the mountain, and the site where the deity is now worshiped is said to be built by the Jain merchant Jagdusha in the 13th century.
