= Harsiddhi Devi Mandir, Rangir =

Temple in Madhya Pradesh, India

Coordinates: 23.61°N 78.92°E

Harsiddhi Devi Mandir
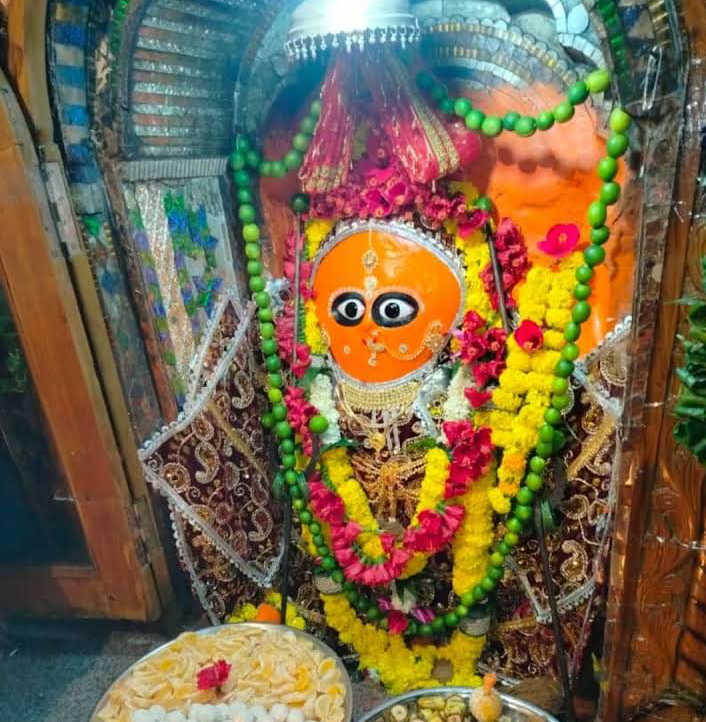
- Devi Harsiddhi

- Location in Madhya Pradesh

Religion
- Affiliation: Hinduism
- Festival: Navratri

Location
- Location: Rangir, Sagar District
- State: Madhya Pradesh
- Country: India

Harsiddhi Devi Mandir is a Hindu temple dedicated to Devi Harsiddhi in the Sagar District of Madhya Pradesh, India.

== History ==
The temple is situated on the banks of Dehar River, about 20 km from Rehli on the road between Rahli and Sagar. It was a witness to a battle between Maharaja Chhatrasal and Mughal Faujdar Khaliq of Dhamoni. Maratha Subedar Govindrao Pandit had made Rangir his headquarters.

=== Beliefe ===
According to beliefs, Goddess Sati's raan had fallen here, hence the name of this place became Rangir, it is considered one of the 52 Shaktipeeths of the Goddess.

== Temples ==
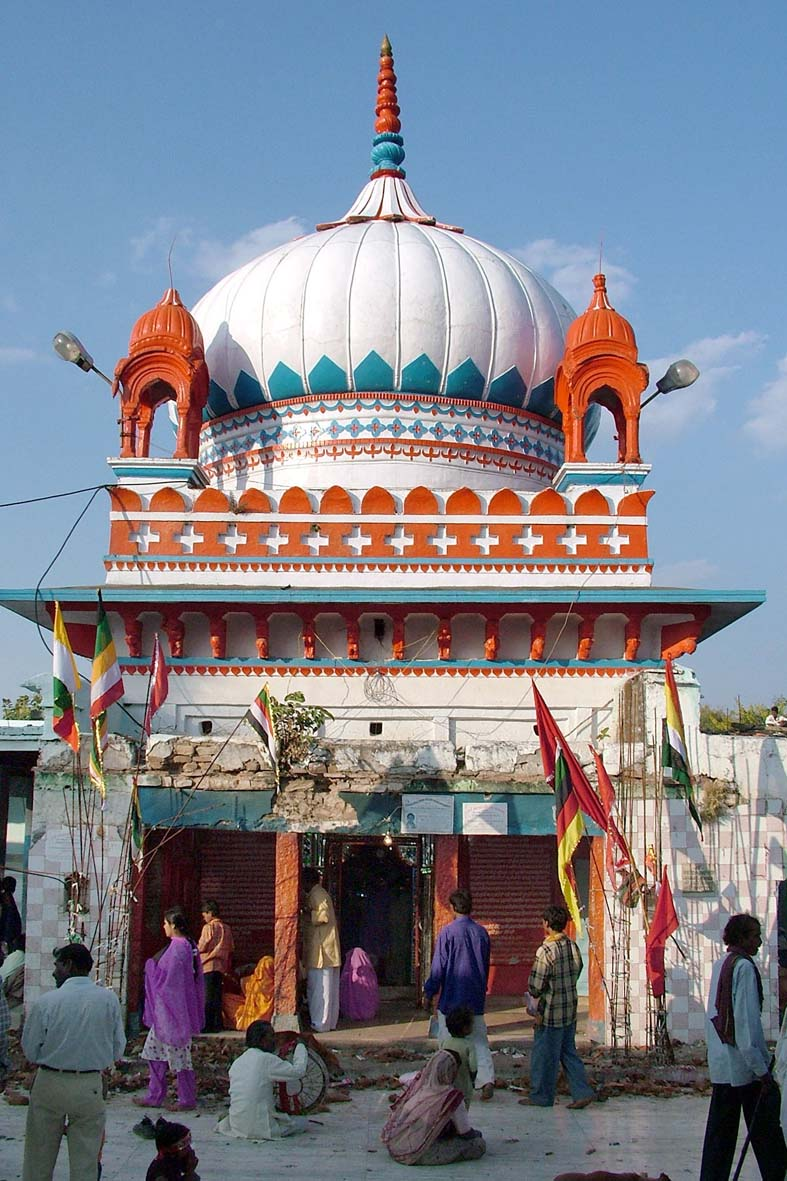
Rangir Temple

=== Harsiddhi Mandir ===
There is a temple of Harsiddhi Devi on a nearby hill, where a fair is held in her honor in the months of Ashwin and Chaitra. Chaitra fair has special significance and during this time thousands of devotees come here.

=== Boodhi Rangir ===
On the other side of the river is the Budhi Rangir temple, it is believed that earlier the temple of the goddess used to be there, to reach the temple one has to cross the river.

== Miracles ==
The image of the goddess is held in great veneration and people believe that she changes her form thrice every day, as a child at dawn, a young girl at mid day and an old women in the evening. A government rest house of forest department is located here.

== Access ==
Rangir is well connected with roads. Sagar is 40 km away, served by a railway station.
