= Bhadresar =

Bhadresar Bhadreshwar
- Village
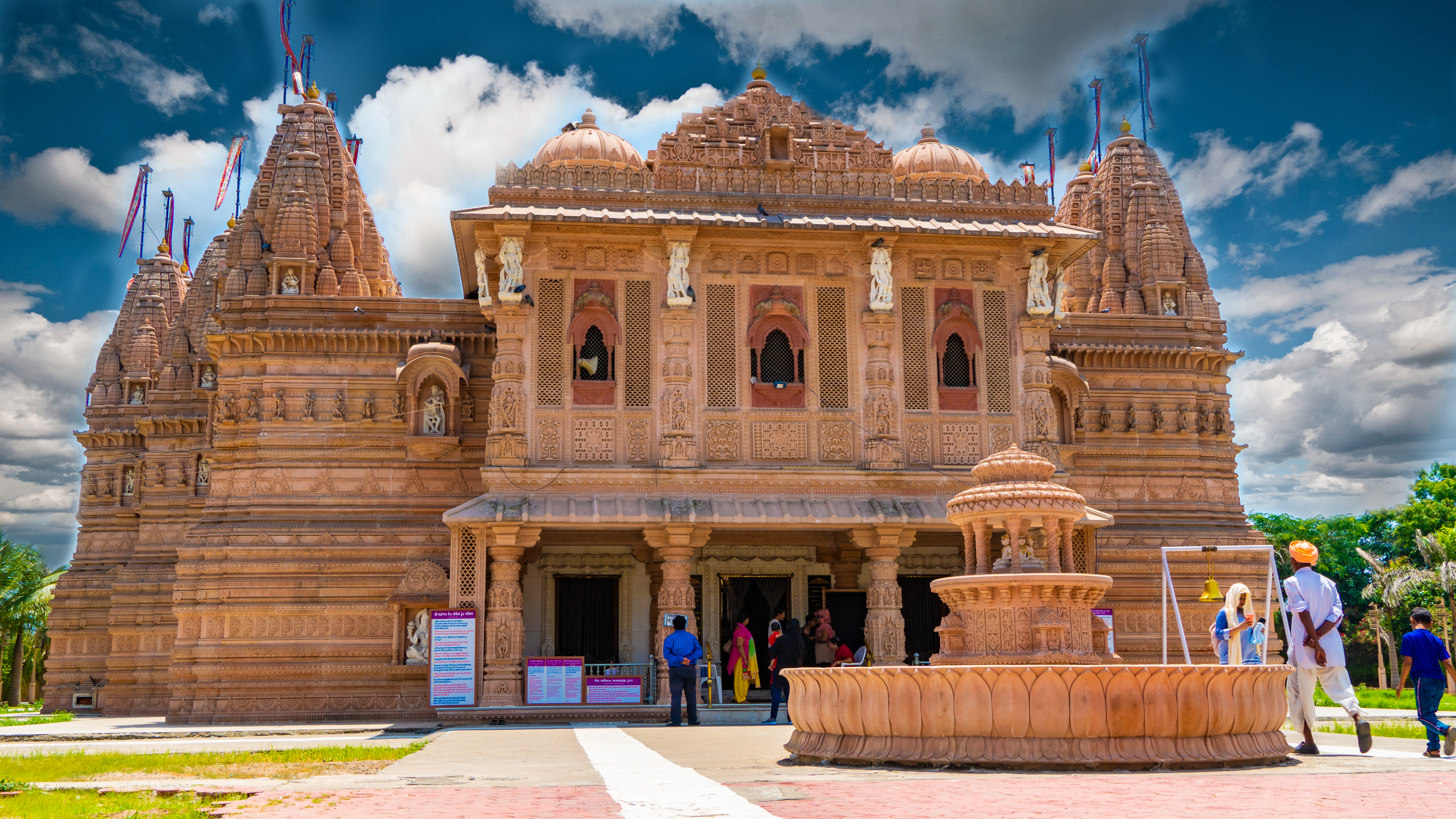
- Bhadresar Jain Temple

- Location in Gujarat, India Bhadresar (India)
- Coordinates: 22°54′43″N 69°54′14″E
- Country: India
- State: Gujarat
- District: Kutch district

Population (2011)
  - Total: 4,552

Languages
  - Official: Gujarati
- Time zone: UTC+5:30 (IST)
- PIN: 370410
- Vehicle registration: starting with GJ 12
- Sex ratio: 1000/916 ♂/♀

Bhadresar or Bhadreshwar /bəˈdrɛswər/ is a village in Mundra Taluka, Kutch district of Gujarat, India. It is about 27 km from Taluka headquarters Mundra and barely a kilometer away from the seashore.

== History ==
Bhadreshwar is the site of the ancient city of Bhadravati.Bhadravati is mentioned in epic Mahabharata. It is mentioned in the works of Kantavijay, a Jain monk.

The earliest source of information regarding this place is an inscription on the Ajitnath statue in Vasai Jain temple which records Samvat 622 (555 AD) which may be marking Samvat 1622 (1565 AD) also. The Vasai Jain Temple is said to have been founded in the 21st year of the Vairat era, and dedicated to Vasai by Siddhasen of the race of Hari. His successors were Mahasen, Narsen, Bhojraj, Vanraj, Sarangdev, Virasen, and Harisen, who lived in the time of Vikram (57 BC). Harisen had left his kingdom to his widow Lilavati. Lilavati was succeeded by his nephew Kirtidhara. Then came Dharnipal, Devdatt and Danjiraj. In the time of Dhaniraj, the country was plundered by many chiefs.

In 156, (Samvat 213), Vanraj Vaghela of Munjpur, who was Jain, seized the country. He was succeeded by Yograj, Ratnadatta or Shivaditya and Vijayarao or Vaisiddha. Next, after a time of misrule, the Kathis of Pavargadh seized Bhadravati and kept it for 147 years. After them, 651 (Samvat 618), Kanak Chavda of Patan took the country, built the temple, and in 555 (Samvat 622) set up the statue of Ajitnath which may be brought in to fit the date on the statue. Kanak's successor was Akad Chavda, a Shaiva. During his time, the village was invaded by Sayyid Lal Shah and Mughuls. He was followed by his son Bhuvad who lost his kingdom to the Solanki Rajputs of Bhangadh. The new rulers changed the name of the place to Bhadreshwar in 741 (Samvat 798), and continued to hold it until 1132 (Samvat 1189). Navghan, the son of Bhimrao, was the last of them.

in 1178 Fateh Khan Pithu A Soomra Chief Of Nagar Parker Invaded whole of Kutch and Reached the City of Bhadresar which he destroyed. (See Sack of Bhadresar for more information)

The other statues of the Jain temple mark Samvat 1232 (1175 AD) as their dates. Perhaps the earliest historical fact is that in Samvat 1182 (1125 AD), Jagdusha, a Jain merchant and philanthropist who had made a fortune as a grain dealer in a time of famine, received a grant of Bhadreshwar and had the temple so thoroughly repaired that all traces of antiquity were removed. He died without heirs in 1181 (Samvat 1238) and the village fell into the hands Naughan Vaghela and his vakils Ajjaramal Shantidas and Nagandas Tejpal. Vastupal-Tejapal, the ministers in court of Viradhaval of Vaghela dynasty visited the temple with Sangha in Samvat 1286 and was well received by Navghan. They managed to convince Viradhaval to get his daughter married with Sarangdev, the grandson of Navghan. In the twelfth and thirteenth centuries this was a most popular place of pilgrimage among Jains.

Under the Hala Jadeja, it was seized by Jam Jadeja and afterwards by Jam Raval in 1535 (Samvat 1592). Since then it has been neglected. In 1763, the walls of the old fort began to be pulled down and the stones used for building. About 1810 even the old temples were razed to supply stones to build the seaport town of Mundra.

On 15 December 1815, the army of Cutch State was defeated near Bhadreshwar. The army of the British East India Company was led by Colonel East and the army of Cutch was led by a Muslim commander, Hussain Miyan met near Bhadreshwar. The British army was behind the Vasai Jain Temple and the temple was in between them. Husain Miyan respected the sanctity of the temple and he didn't fire on the British, fearing the temple might be damaged. The British army won and occupied the fortified town of Anjar, port of Tuna and adjacent villages by 25 December 1815. This led to negotiations between the Cutch and British rulers. The Jadeja rulers of Kutch accepted the suzerainty of the British in 1818 and Captain James MacMurdo was posted as British Political Resident stationed at Bhuj. The Anjar district, however, remained under direct occupation of British forces for seven years until 25 December 1822, when it was handed back to Cutch State by an agreement.

After the independence of India in 1947, Cutch State acceded unto the dominion of India and was constituted an independent commissionaire, Kutch State. In 1956, Kutch State was merged with Bombay state, which in 1960 was divided into the new linguistic states of Gujarat and Maharashtra, with Kutch becoming part of Gujarat state. Bhadreshwar now falls under Mundra Taluka of Kutch district.

== Places of interest ==
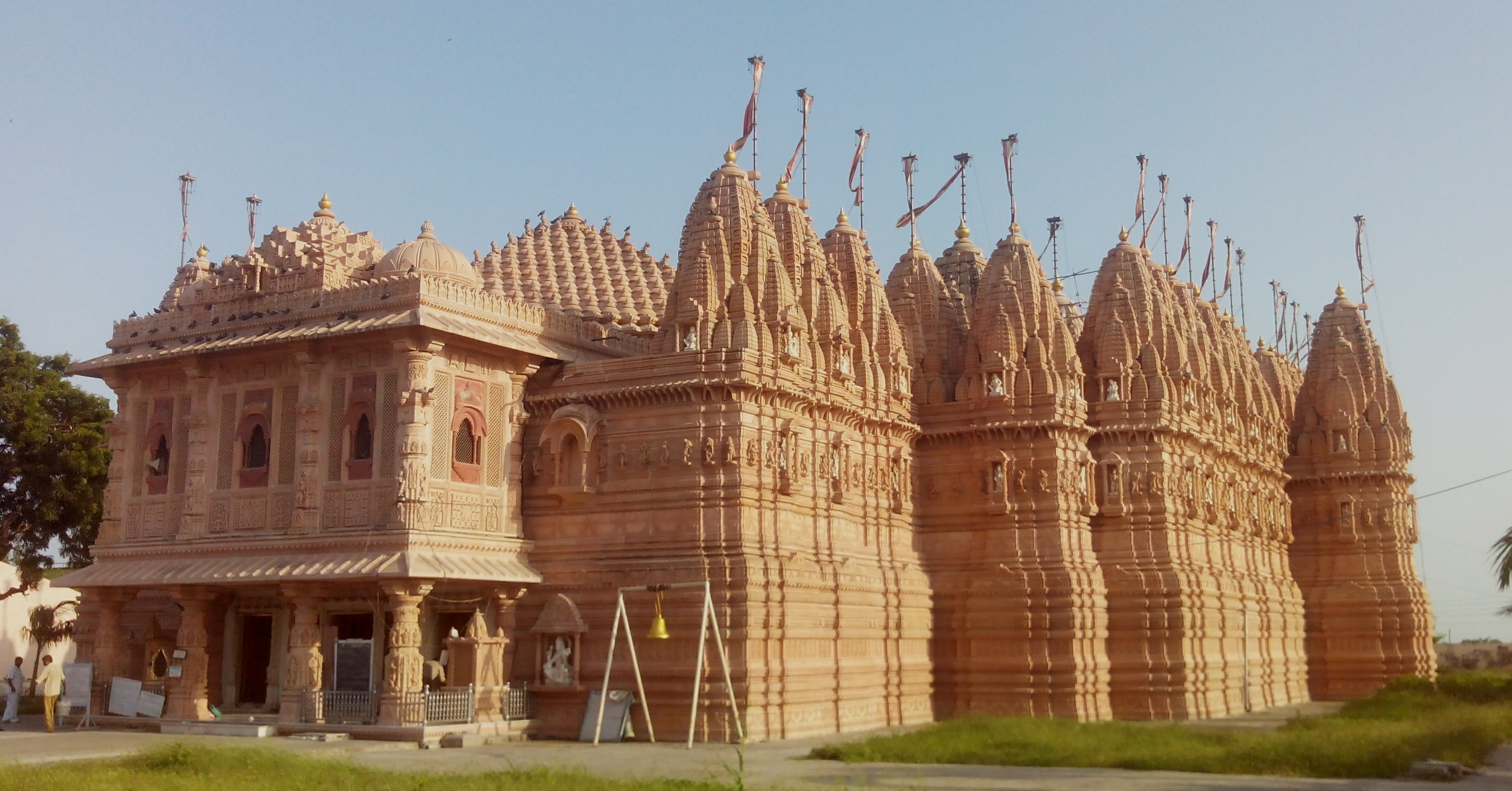
Rebuilt Vasai Jain Temple after 2001 earthquake

=== Vasai Jain Temple ===
Vasai Jain Temple is believed to be one of the oldest Jain temples in India, although they have been renovated and rehabilitated from time to time. It is said a Jain layman named Devchandra laid the foundation stone of this temple centuries ago. In 13th century, the temple was renovated extensively by Jagdusha. The temples have been destroyed many times due to natural calamities like earthquakes. The chronicles of Mistris of Kutch, mention that they were the architects and artisans, who renovated temples during the earthquakes of 1819, 1844–45 and 1875.

In the former temple, the lower part was considered the oldest in age, perhaps about 1170. The temple complex was again completely devastated in earthquake of 26 January 2001; however, it has now been completely rebuilt to as many of the old shrines were destroyed to the extent that it could not be rehabilitated.

The general plan is like that of the Dilwara Temples on mount Abu. It stands in a court about 48 feet wide by 85 long, surrounded by a row of forty-four shrines with a corridor in front. The temple stands in a courtyard, which, from the line of the temple front, is covered by three pillared domes. The temple, facing the east, is entered by a flight of steps that rise from the outer door to the covered area in front of the sanctuary. Over the porch is another large dome covering an area separated by a low screen wall from the area of the entrance hall, mandap, between it and the front of the temple itself. At the south-west corner and behind the cells on the left side is a row of chambers with cellars entered by lifting up flagstones in the floor. In the shrine are three white marble images. The central image is Ajitnath, the second of the Tirthankars, with the date 622 probably for Samvat 1622 or AD 1565. On his right is Parshwanath with the snake hood marked 1175 (Samvat 1232), and on his left Santinath, the 16th Tirthankar, also marked 1175 (Samvat 1232). On the extreme right is the image of the black or Shamla Parshwanath.

=== Lal Shahbaz Dargah ===
The Shrine of Ibrahim, is locally known as Pir Lal Shahbaz Dargah, and is said to be that of Lal Shahbaz Qalandar, whose shrine is actually located in the Pakistani city of Sehwan Sharif. It is a small walled enclosure that has a square pyramid shaped dome. It is round in the inside and supported on eight pillars set against the wall. The roof of the porch is flat and divided into 9×3 small squares, each with lotus flowers inside. Round the architrave, above the vine-ornamented wall-head course, there is a deep line of Arab inscription in large square Kufic characters, and on the right end of the wall there are two lines of inscription. In the court some graves also have Kufic inscriptions. These epigraphs constructed in AH Dhi’l-hijja 554 (December 1159-January 1160 AD) marked the first use of Kufic script as well as the first epigraphic evidence of Muslim settlement in India.

=== Chhoti Masjid ===
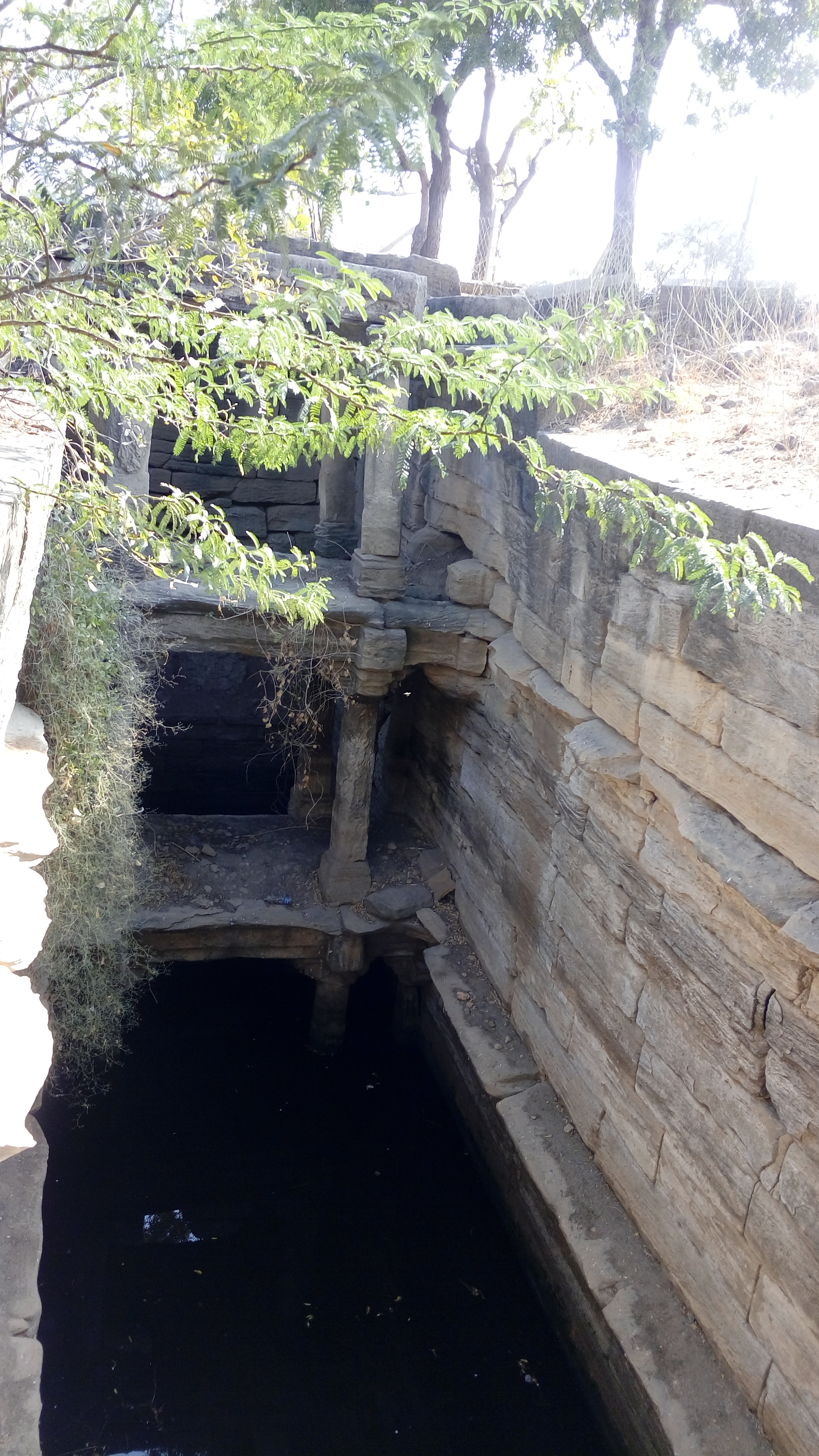
Duda stepwell

Chhoti Masjid is a very old mosque which is reliably dated to the late 12th century, meaning they predate the well known Islamic architecture of Ahmedabad by 250 years or so, making them in all likelihood the first mosques built in India.

=== Solahkhambhi Mosque ruins ===
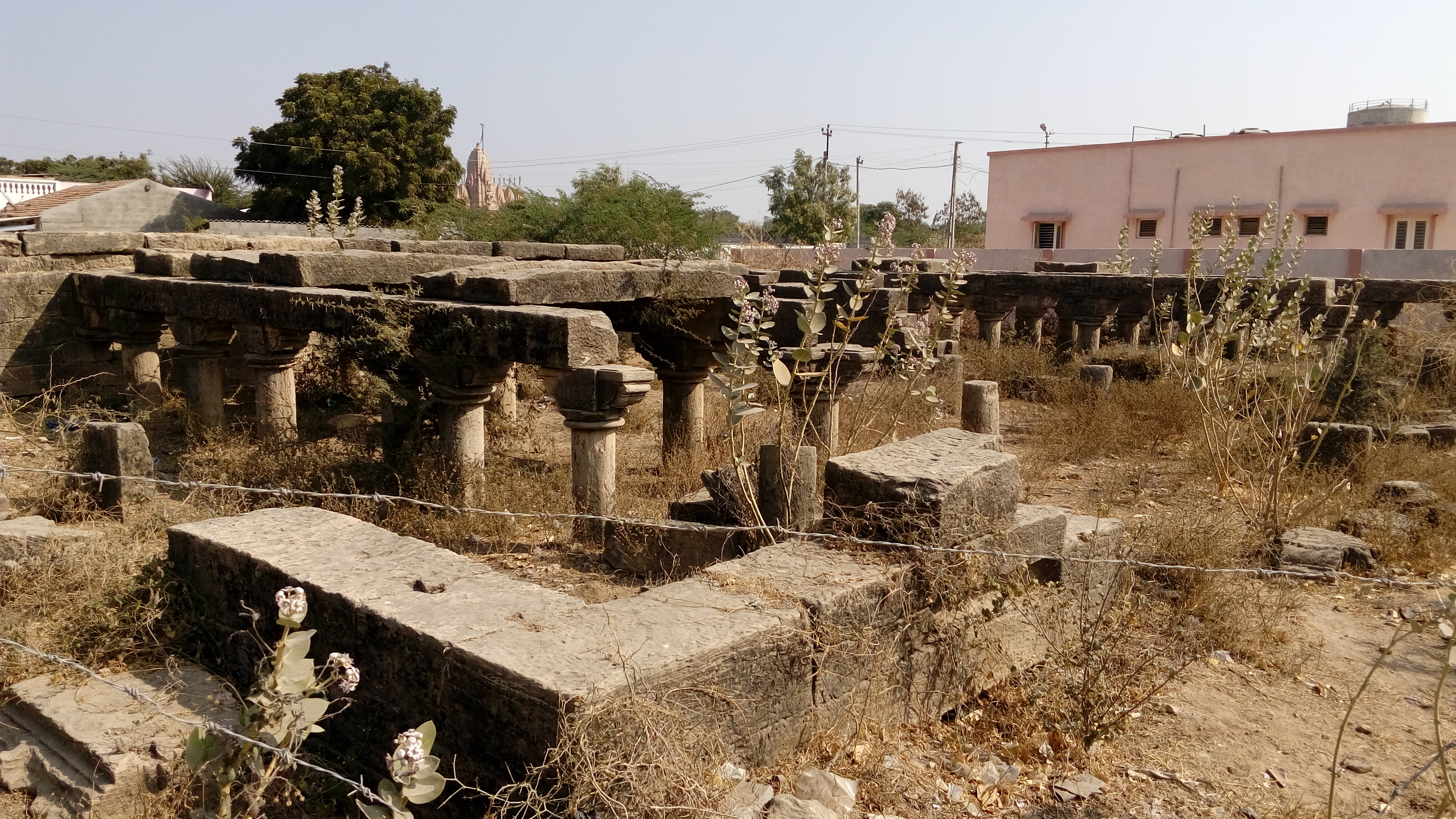
Ruins of mosque

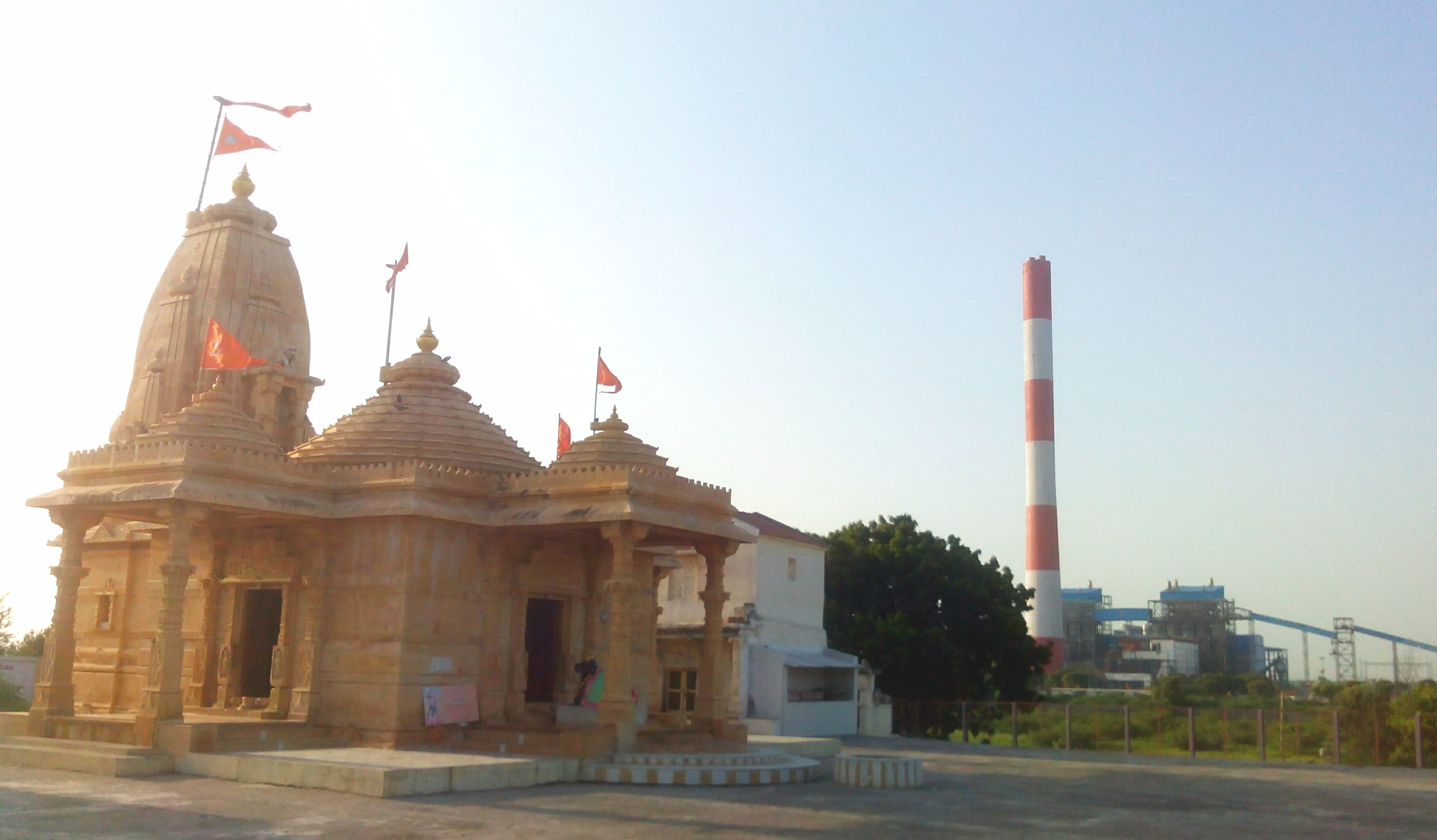
Chokhanda Mahadev Temple; OPG power plant is visible in the background

On the south-west of Vasai Jain temple, there are ruins of another mosque known as Solahkhambhi Mosque which is partially buried in the sand and is no longer in use.

The original entrance is on the east side, within which is built a small chamber, apparently never finished. The porch is raised on eight pillars, with pilasters against the walls. At the back is a mehrab, a plain semi-circular recess, and two neat doors leading into an inner apartment, possibly a second place of prayer for a select number. It has four doors, two at each end. This mosque is built of pretty large stones, most accurately jointed, and all the roofs are of flat slabs. The doors have drips over them, and the two into the front apartment have semi-circular arches, the others lintels. The architraves are carved with neat veli or creeper patterns and with large flowers below. The pillars are square at the base, octagonal in the middle and circular above having bracket capitals above to support lintels which are 9 feet long. In the front of the mehrab are two rows of pillars in good condition followed by two rows of pillars with disturbed condition. It followed by a wall and four more rows of pillars and some other pillars, probably of porch.

=== Duda stepwell ===
Duda Vav is a large and substantial though plain stepwell with a lintel about 17 feet 7 inches long by 2 feet 1 inches square. It was constructed by placing heavy blocks of stones on one another. The stepwell is now partially collapsed and is ruined. There was a dome of Shiva Temple near it in the 1850s. It was 15 feet 18 1/2 inches overall and the pillars are 1 foot 4 inches long.

=== Chokhanda Mahadev Temple ===
There is also an ancient Shiva temple known as Chokhanda Mahadev situated at the seashore. This old temple was made with red stones. There is also the centuries-old Rokadiya Hanuman temple.

== Economy ==
The majority of the population relies on fishery.

There is a thermal power plant by OPG Power. The Bhadresar has been included in special economic zone of Mundra. However, the local fishermen and other communities have protested the development and there is resentment that the traditional livelihoods of residents in the area have been affected by the new industrial projects, leading to organized protests.
