= Harsidhhi =

Regional Hindu goddess

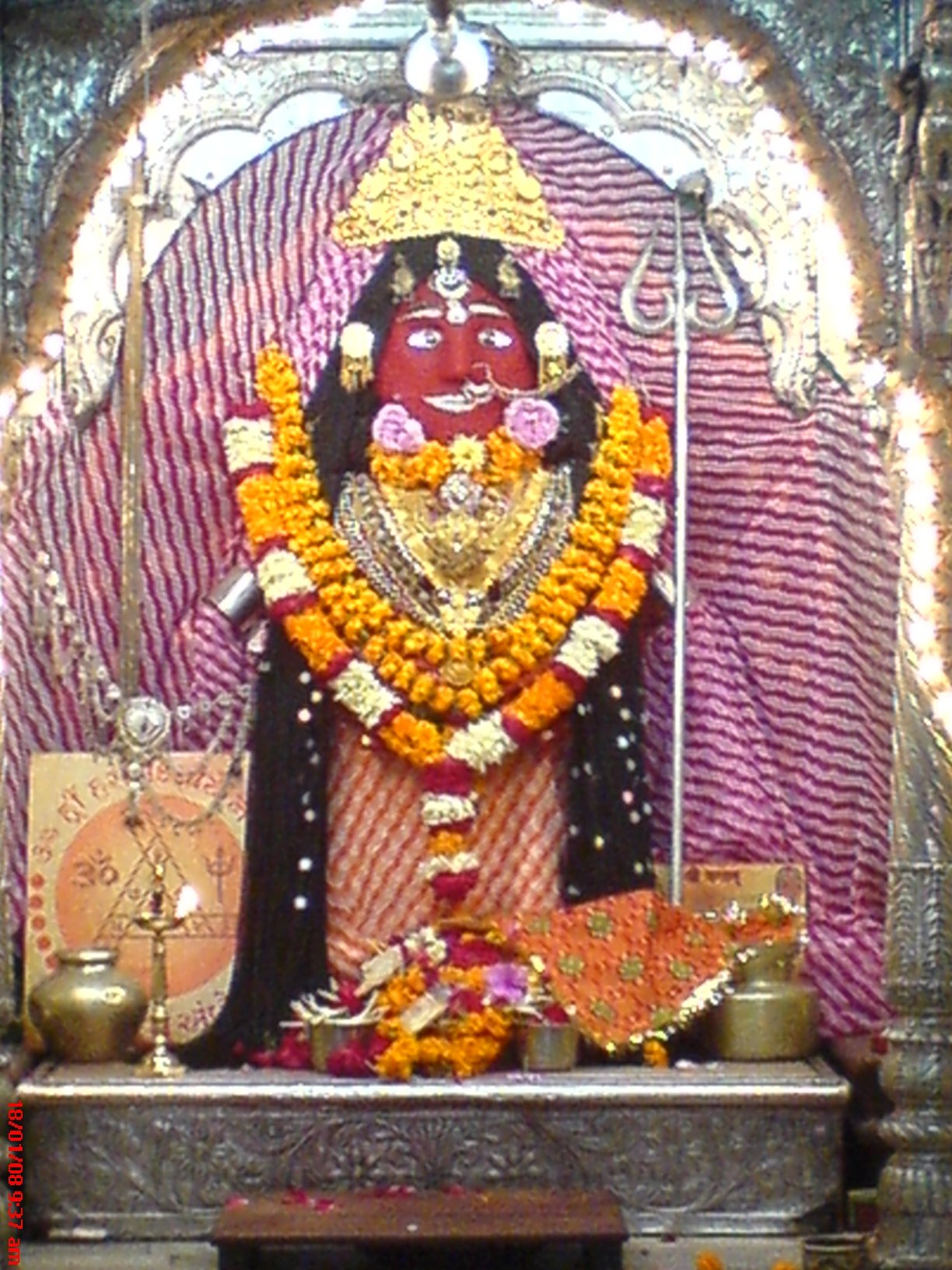
Harsidhhi Mataji Idol at Rajpipla, where the original Parmara rulers of Rajpipla, who migrated from Ujjain had brought her as their Kuladevi.

Harsidhhi, one of the aspects of Durga, is a regional Hindu goddess, popular in Gujarat, Madhya Pradesh, adjoining Maharashtra states of India.

== Kuldevi ==
She is worshiped as Kuldevi by many Kshatriya, Brahmin, and Vaishya varnas. Some people of the Jain religion also worship the goddess. She is worshiped by fishermen and other sea-faring tribes and people of Gujarat as she is considered protector of ships at sea. She is Kuldevi of Kshatriya and Rajputs from Kathiyawad or Saurashtra region in Gujarat. She was the kuldevi of Krishna and Chandragupta Vikramaditya

== Temples ==
=== Koyla Dungar, Gandhvi (Harshad) ===
Jagadu, the 13th century merchant from Kutch, is accredited for building a temple. The present temple at the foot-hill of Koyal Dungar is near the old port town of Miyani near Porbandar. His statue is placed on the right side of the goddess in the temple. The legend associated with the temple holds that the original temple was on the hill overlooking the creek. The idols were moved to the foot of the hill. The seashore of Miyani was inaccessible, as any ship that came within eyesight of Goddesses would sink. Jagdu Shah was travelling with his fleet of 7 ships. He was on the last ship with his family. One by one the other 6 ships sank in front of his eyes. His Captain reminded him that he had warned that no ships can reach within sight of the temple and that only Goddess Harsidhhi could save them. Jagdu prayed to Devi for safe anchoring in shore and his ship reached safely the shore.

=== Harsiddhi Devi Mandir, Rangir ===
This temple of Devi Harsiddhi, located in Sagar, Madhya Pradesh is known in the Bundelkhand region. This temple was built by Bundela rulers.

== Photo gallery ==
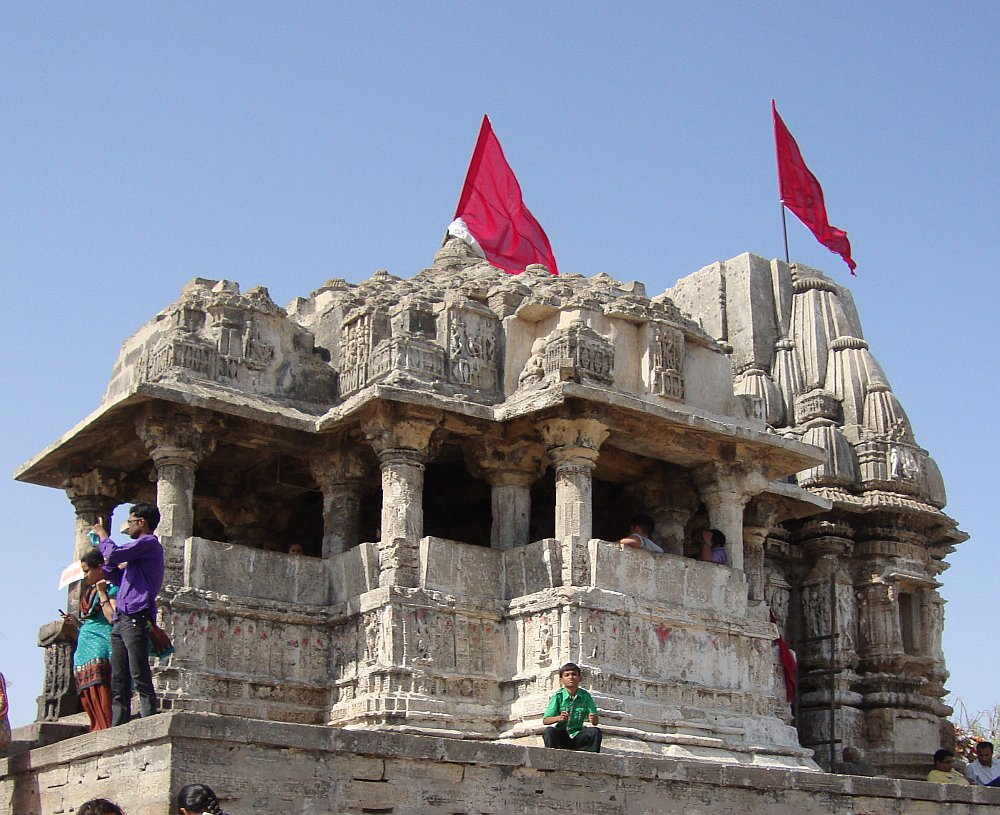
Ancient temple of Harsidhhi also known as Harshad atop Koyala hill near Miyani, Gujarat

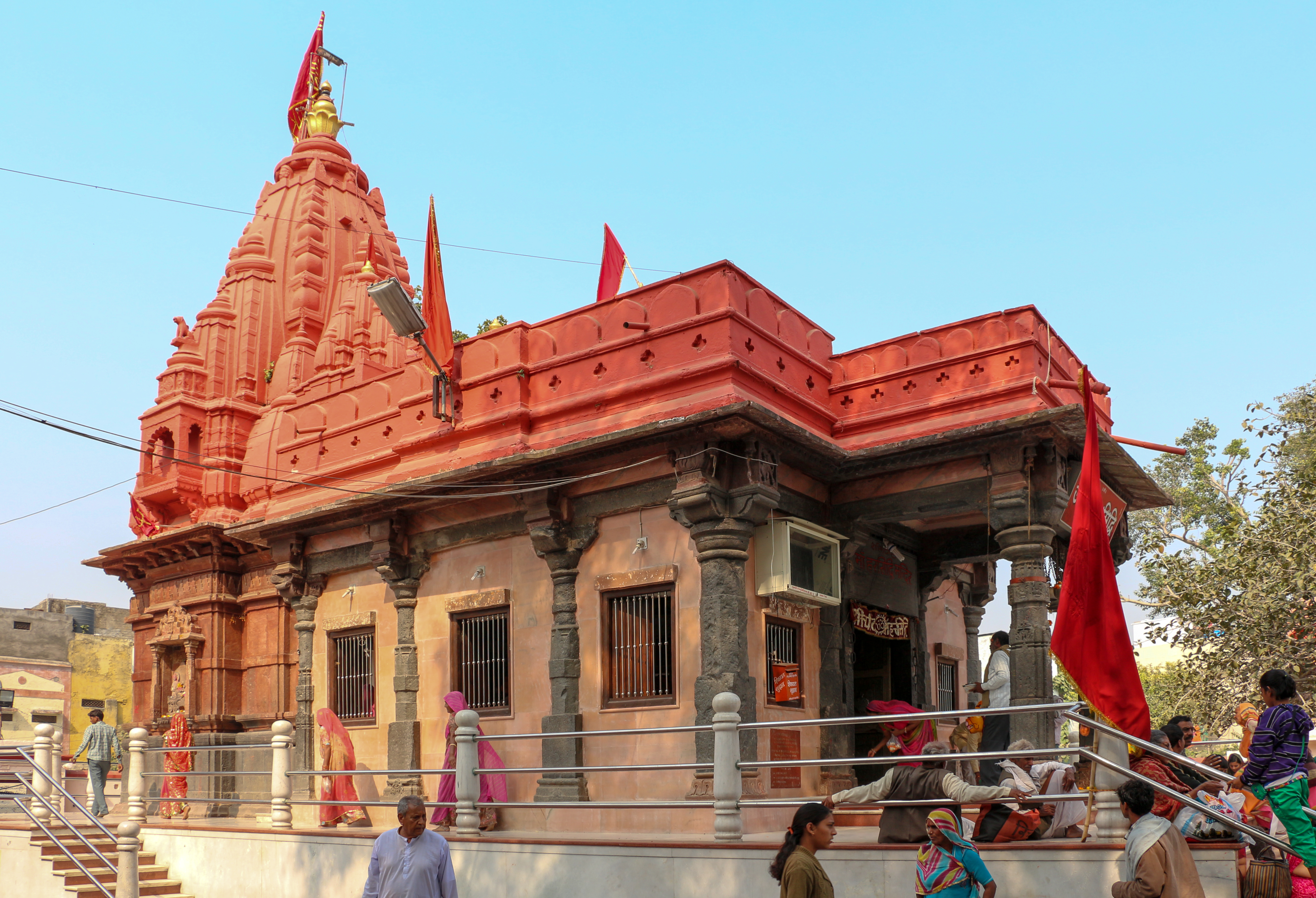
Harsidhhi Mata Temple at Ujjain, Madhya Pradesh

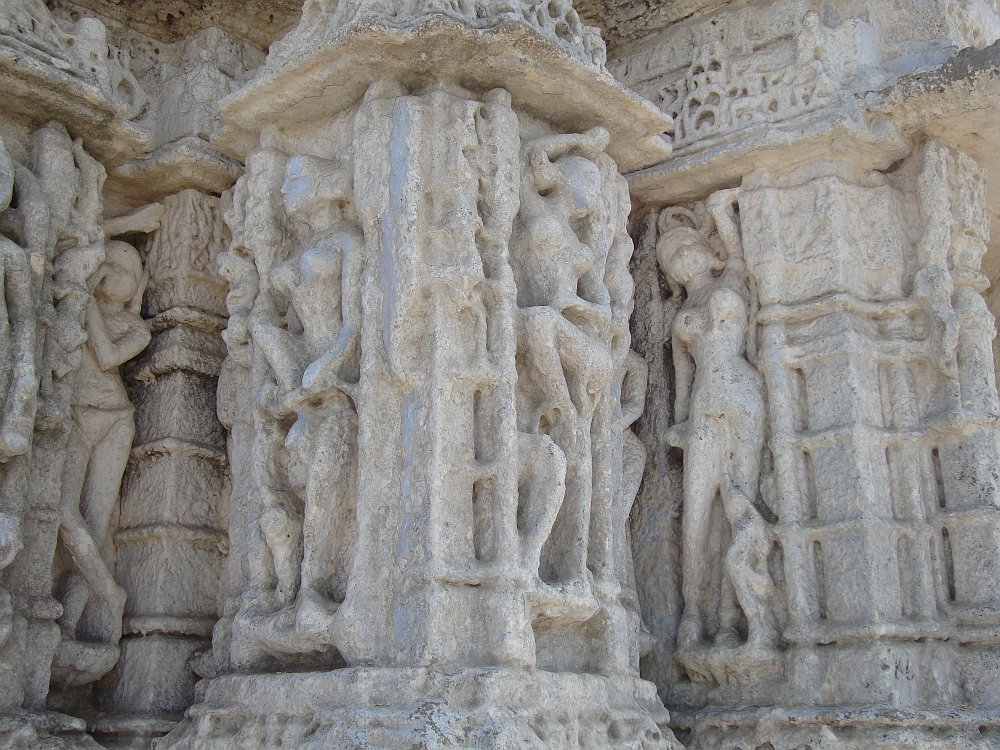
Carvings on ancient temple of Harshad on Koyla Hill
