= State Highway 38 (Madhya Pradesh) =

State highway in Madhya Pradesh, India

State Highway 38

Route information
- Maintained by MPRDC

Major junctions
- North end: Mangod
- Manawar, Dharampuri, Khalghat, Dhamnod, Mandleshwar, Maheshwar
- South end: Barwaha

Location
- Country: India
- State: Madhya Pradesh

Highway system
- Roads in India; Expressways; National; State; Asian; State Highways in Madhya Pradesh

Madhya Pradesh State Highway 38 (MP SH 38) is a State Highway running from Mangod village in Dhar district lying on NH-47 till Barwaha city on MP SH-27.

It passes through Manawar, Dharampuri, Khalghat, Dhamnod, Mandleshwar and Maheshwar.

== See also ==
- List of state highways in Madhya Pradesh
- Madhya Pradesh Road Development Corporation Limited
