= Vidisha Lok Sabha constituency =

Lok Sabha Constituency in Madhya Pradesh, India

Coordinates: 23.53°N 77.82°E

Vidisha MP–18
- Lok Sabha constituency
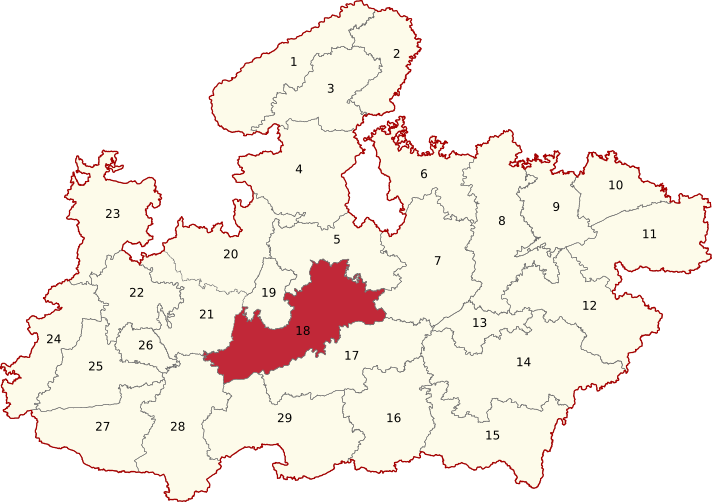
- Vidisha Lok Sabha constituency within Madhya Pradesh

Constituency details
- Country: India
- Region: Central India
- State: Madhya Pradesh
- Assembly constituencies: Bhojpur; Sanchi; Silwani; Vidisha; Basoda; Budhni; Ichhawar; Khategaon
- Established: 1967
- Total electors: 19,45,404
- Reservation: None

Member of Parliament
- 18th Lok Sabha
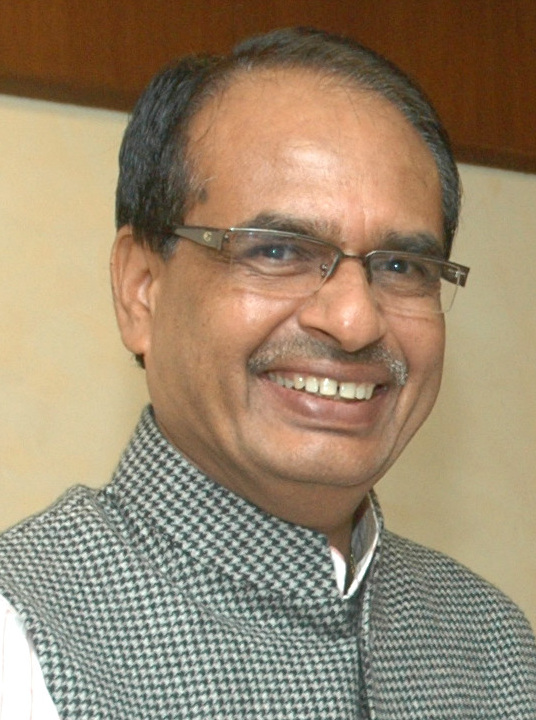
- Incumbent Shivraj Singh Chouhan; Union Minister of Agriculture and Farmer's Welfare; Union Minister of Rural Development
- Party: BJP
- Alliance: NDA
- Elected year: 2024
- Preceded by: Ramakant Bhargava, BJP

Vidisha is one of the 29 Lok Sabha constituencies in the Indian state of Madhya Pradesh. This constituency came into existence in 1967. This constituency covers parts of Raisen, Vidisha, Sehore and Dewas districts.

== Legislative Assembly segments ==
Presently, since the delimitation of the parliamentary and legislative assembly constituencies in 2008, Vidisha Lok Sabha constituency comprises the following eight Legislative Assembly segments:

| # | Name | District | Member | Party | 2024 Lead |
|---|---|---|---|---|---|
| 141 | Bhojpur | Raisen | Surendra Patwa | BJP | BJP |
| 142 | Sanchi (SC) | Raisen | Prabhuram Choudhary | BJP | BJP |
| 143 | Silwani | Raisen | Devendra Patel | INC | BJP |
| 144 | Vidisha | Vidisha | Mukesh Tandan | BJP | BJP |
| 145 | Basoda | Vidisha | Hari Singh Raghuwanshi | BJP | BJP |
| 156 | Budhni | Sehore | Ramakant Bhargava | BJP | BJP |
| 158 | Ichhawar | Sehore | Karan Singh Verma | BJP | BJP |
| 173 | Khategaon | Dewas | Aashish Govind Sharma | BJP | BJP |

== Members of Parliament ==
| Year | Member | Party |
|---|---|---|
1952-1967 : Constituency did not exist
| 1967 | Pandit Shiv Sharma | Bharatiya Jana Sangh |
| 1971 | Ramnath Goenka | Bharatiya Jana Sangh |
| 1977 | Raghavji | Bharatiya Lok Dal |
| 1980 | Pratap Bhanu Sharma | Indian National Congress (I) |
| 1984 | Pratap Bhanu Sharma | Indian National Congress |
| 1989 | Raghavji | Bharatiya Janata Party |
| 1991 | Atal Bihari Vajpayee | Bharatiya Janata Party |
| 1991^ | Shivraj Singh Chouhan | Bharatiya Janata Party |
| 1996 | Shivraj Singh Chouhan | Bharatiya Janata Party |
| 1998 | Shivraj Singh Chouhan | Bharatiya Janata Party |
| 1999 | Shivraj Singh Chouhan | Bharatiya Janata Party |
| 2004 | Shivraj Singh Chouhan | Bharatiya Janata Party |
| 2006^ | Rampal Singh | Bharatiya Janata Party |
| 2009 | Sushma Swaraj | Bharatiya Janata Party |
| 2014 | Sushma Swaraj | Bharatiya Janata Party |
| 2019 | Ramakant Bhargava | Bharatiya Janata Party |
| 2024 | Shivraj Singh Chouhan | Bharatiya Janata Party |

^ denotes By Poll

1. BJP (12 times) (70.6%)
2. BJS (2 times) (11.8%)
3. BLD (1 time) (5.88%)
4. INC (1 time) (5.88%)
5. INC(I) (1 time) (5.88%)

== Election results ==
Vote share of Winning candidates
| 2024 | 76.70% |
| 2019 | 68.23% |
| 2014 | 66.55% |
| 2009 | 78.80% |
| 2006 (by-poll) | 41.17% |
| 2004 | 65.19% |
| 1999 | 55.65% |
| 1998 | 56.99% |
| 1996 | 54.15% |
| 1991 (by-poll) | 55.86% |
| 1991 | 58.81% |
| 1989 | 58.97% |
| 1984 | 47.77% |
| 1980 | 43.47% |
| 1977 | 64.97% |
| 1971 | 52.04% |
| 1967 | 57.20% |

=== 2024 ===
2024 Indian general election: Vidisha
| Party | Candidate | Votes | % | ±% |
|---|---|---|---|---|
| BJP | Shivraj Singh Chouhan | 1,116,460 | 76.70 | |
| INC | Pratap Bhanu Sharma | 295,052 | 20.27 | |
| BSP | Kishan Lal Ladiya | 10,816 | 0.74 | |
| NOTA | None of the above | 9,280 | 0.64 | |
| IND | 4 Independent Candidates | 9,113 | 0.63 | |
| OTH | 6 Other Party Candidates | 14,937 | 1.03 | |
| Majority | | 821,408 | 56.43 | |
| Turnout | | 1,455,658 | 74.78 | |
| BJP hold | | Swing | | |

=== 2019 ===
2019 Indian general election: Vidisha
| Party | Candidate | Votes | % | ±% |
|---|---|---|---|---|
| BJP | Ramakant Bhargava | 853,022 | 68.23 | |
| INC | Shailendra Patel | 349,938 | 27.99 | |
| BSP | Geetawali Er. P.s. Ahirwar | 14,409 | 1.15 | |
| NOTA | None of the above | 8,619 | 0.69 | |
| IND | 8 Independent Candidates | 18,644 | 1.49 | |
| OTH | 2 Other Party Candidates | 5,612 | 0.45 | |
| Majority | | 503,084 | 40.24 | |
| Turnout | | 1,250,244 | 71.79 | |
| BJP hold | | Swing | | |

=== 2014 ===
2014 Indian general election: Vidisha
| Party | Candidate | Votes | % | ±% |
|---|---|---|---|---|
| BJP | Sushma Swaraj | 714,348 | 66.55 | |
| INC | Lakshman Singh | 303,650 | 28.29 | |
| GGP | Kamlesh Sallam | 10,824 | 1.01 | |
| NOTA | None of the Above | 10,618 | 0.99 | |
| BSP | Amar Singh Patel | 9,699 | 0.90 | |
| IND | Chandresh Singh | 5,359 | 0.50 | |
| AAP | Eng. Bhagwat Singh Rajput | 5,204 | 0.48 | |
| IND | Ramdayal Kori | 4,159 | 0.39 | |
| SP | Manoj Kumar Yadav | 3,293 | 0.31 | |
| OTH | 4 Other Party Candidates | 6,319 | 0.59 | |
| Majority | | 410,698 | 38.26 | |
| Turnout | | 1,073,473 | 65.70 | |
| BJP hold | | Swing | | |

=== 2009 ===
In the 2009 general election, the INC's Vidisha candidate, Choudhary Raghavji Patel, had his nomination rejected for submitting a photocopy instead of the required original Form-A, leaving Sushma Swaraj almost unopposed. The Congress subsequently removed Patel from his post, holding him responsible for the lapse.

2009 Indian general election: Vidisha
| Party | Candidate | Votes | % | ±% |
|---|---|---|---|---|
| BJP | Sushma Swaraj | 438,235 | 78.80 | |
| SP | Ch. Munavver Salim | 48,391 | 8.70 | |
| BSP | Dr. Premshankar Sharma | 37,142 | 6.68 | |
| RPI(A) | Bhai Munshilal Silawat | 12,136 | 2.18 | |
| RDMP | Ram Gopal Malviya | 3,140 | 0.56 | |
| LJP | Harbhajan Jangre | 5,054 | 0.91 | |
| IND | Ganeshram Lodhi | 4,434 | 0.80 | |
| IND | Rajeshwar Singh Yadav | 7,596 | 1.37 | |
| Majority | | 389,844 | 70.10 | |
| Turnout | | 556,128 | 45.09 | |
| BJP hold | | Swing | | |

=== 2006 by-election ===
The 2006 Vidisha Lok Sabha by-election was held after Shivraj Singh Chouhan resigned as MP upon becoming Chief Minister of Madhya Pradesh in 2005. The BJP retained the seat, with Rampal Singh winning the by-election.

By Election, 2006: Vidisha
| Party | Candidate | Votes | % | ±% |
|---|---|---|---|---|
| BJP | Rampal Singh | 258,263 | 41.17 | −24.02 |
| INC | Rajshree Rudra Pratap Singh | 1,73,176 | 27.61 | +2.13 |
| BJSP | Raghunandan Sharma | 1,37,354 | 21.89 | +21.89 |
| SP | Ch. Munavver Salim | 17,397 | 2.77 | −0.51 |
| IND. | Malti Bai | 10,041 | 1.60 | +1.60 |
| Majority | | 85,087 | 13.56 | −26.15 |
| Turnout | | 6,27,219 | 47.68 | −2.32 |
| BJP hold | | Swing | -24.02 | |

=== 2004 results ===
2004 Indian general elections: Vidisha
| Party | Candidate | Votes | % | ±% |
|---|---|---|---|---|
| BJP | Shivraj Singh Chouhan | 428,030 | 65.19 | +9.54 |
| INC | Narbada Prasad Sharma | 1,67,304 | 25.48 | −17.45 |
| SP | Ch. Munavver Salim | 21,543 | 3.28 | +2.24 |
| BSP | Khuman Singh Kushwaha | 15,638 | 2.38 | new |
| IND. | Mohan Babu Sharma | 10,876 | 1.66 | new |
| GGP | Rajesh Kumar Pandey | 8,280 | 1.26 | new |
| IND. | Abdul Jabbar | 4,893 | 0.75 | new |
| Majority | | 2,60,726 | 39.71 | +26.99 |
| Turnout | | 6,56,555 | 50.00 | −5.96 |
| BJP hold | | Swing | | |

=== 1999 ===
1999 Indian general election: Vidisha
| Party | Candidate | Votes | % | ±% |
|---|---|---|---|---|
| BJP | Shivraj Singh Chouhan | 360,421 | 55.65 | |
| INC | Jasvant Singh | 278,024 | 42.93 | |
| SP | Azijkhan Dada Bhai | 6,749 | 1.04 | |
| AJBP | Shivdayal Tiwari | 1,690 | 0.26 | |
| IND | Abdul Jabbar Khan | 761 | 0.12 | |
| Majority | | 82,397 | 12.72 | |
| Turnout | | 655,686 | 55.96 | |
| BJP hold | | Swing | | |

=== 1998 results ===
1998 Indian general election: Vidisha
| Party | Candidate | Votes | % | ±% |
|---|---|---|---|---|
| BJP | Shivraj Singh Chouhan | 374,406 | 56.99 | |
| INC | Ashutosh Dayal Sharma | 2,36,548 | 36.01 | |
| BSP | Ajay Kumar Kushwaha | 27,941 | 4.25 | |
| GGP | Onkar Singh Thakur | 5,398 | 0.82 | |
| AD(K) | Omprakash Patel | 4,189 | 0.64 | |
| Majority | | 1,37,858 | 20.98 | |
| Turnout | | 6,56,984 | 59.76 | |
| BJP hold | | Swing | | |

=== 1996 results ===
1996 Indian general election: Vidisha
| Party | Candidate | Votes | % | ±% |
|---|---|---|---|---|
| BJP | Shivraj Singh Chouhan | 310,580 | 54.15 | |
| INC | Hridaya Mohan Jain | 1,34,822 | 23.51 | |
| BSP | Nathoo Ram Lodhi | 43,617 | 7.61 | |
| AIIC(T) | Naresh Jain | 40,328 | 7.03 | |
| IND. | Uday | 7,377 | 1.29 | |
| Majority | | 1,75,758 | 30.64 | |
| Turnout | | 5,73,521 | 53.00 | |
| BJP hold | | Swing | | |

=== 1991 by-election ===
In the 1991 Indian general elections, Atal Bihari Vajpayee won from both Vidisha in Madhya Pradesh and Lucknow in Uttar Pradesh but retained the Lucknow seat, resigning from Vidisha. A by-election was subsequently held in Vidisha in 1991, and the BJP retained the seat.

1991 Lok Sabha by-elections: Vidisha
| Party | Candidate | Votes | % | ±% |
|---|---|---|---|---|
| BJP | Shivraj Singh Chouhan | 304,392 | 55.86 | |
| INC | P. B. Sharma | 215,292 | 39.51 | |
| IND | 14 Independent Candidates | 20,320 | 3.73 | |
| OTH | 3 Other Party Candidates | 4,954 | 0.91 | |
| Majority | | 89,100 | 16.35 | |
| Turnout | | 544,958 | | |
| BJP hold | | Swing | | |

=== 1991 results ===
1991 Indian general election: Vidisha
| Party | Candidate | Votes | % | ±% |
|---|---|---|---|---|
| BJP | Atal Bihari Vajpayee | 279,232 | 58.81 | |
| INC | Pratap Bhanu Sharma | 1,75,098 | 36.88 | |
| JD | Jagdish Yadav | 3,985 | 0.84 | |
| IND. | Faiyaz Ali | 3,457 | 0.73 | |
| IND. | Nujjafar Yarkhan | 3,337 | 0.70 | |
| Majority | | 1,04,134 | 21.93 | |
| Turnout | | 4,74,794 | 50.25 | |
| BJP hold | | Swing | | |

=== 1989 ===
1989 Indian general election: Vidisha
| Party | Candidate | Votes | % | ±% |
|---|---|---|---|---|
| BJP | Raghav Ji | 313,329 | 58.97 | |
| INC | Pratap Bhanu Krishnagopal | 177,197 | 33.35 | |
| IND | Faiyaz Ali | 17,835 | 3.36 | |
| DDP | Bhogi Ram Bhagat Lodhi | 8,757 | 1.65 | |
| BSP | Kamal Kishore Ahirawar | 4,722 | 0.89 | |
| IND | Shahavuddin | 2,000 | 0.38 | |
| IND | Radhelal Agarwal | 1,953 | 0.37 | |
| IND | Ashok Kumar Maheshwari | 1,463 | 0.28 | |
| IND | Om Parkash Soni | 1,367 | 0.26 | |
| LKD(B) | Horilal Shakya Kushwaha | 1,184 | 0.22 | |
| IND | Hargovind | 956 | 0.18 | |
| IND | Mohammad Hamid | 533 | 0.10 | |
| Majority | | 136,132 | 25.62 | |
| Turnout | | 545,748 | 58.94 | |
| BJP gain from INC | | Swing | | |

=== 1984 ===
1984 Indian general election: Vidisha
| Party | Candidate | Votes | % | ±% |
|---|---|---|---|---|
| INC | Pratapbhanu Krishna Gopal | 205,437 | 47.77 | |
| BJP | Raghavji | 195,884 | 45.55 | |
| IND | Pooran | 7,966 | 1.85 | |
| IND | Bhogiram Bhagat | 6,729 | 1.56 | |
| LKD | Kailash Narain Singh | 4,282 | 1.00 | |
| JP | Arun Shrivastava | 3,326 | 0.77 | |
| IND | Radheylal Agarwal | 2,513 | 0.58 | |
| IND | Moji | 1,506 | 0.35 | |
| IND | Vaikunthi Tiwari | 1,429 | 0.33 | |
| IND | Shahabuddin | 981 | 0.23 | |
| Majority | | 9,553 | 2.22 | |
| Turnout | | 442,547 | 61.75 | |
| INC hold | | Swing | | |

=== 1980 ===
1980 Indian general election: Vidisha
| Party | Candidate | Votes | % | ±% |
|---|---|---|---|---|
| INC(I) | Pratapbhanu Krishnagopal | 152,682 | 43.47 | |
| JP | Raghavji | 147,602 | 42.02 | |
| JP(S) | Bharatsingh | 34,751 | 9.89 | |
| INC(U) | Dhannalal | 6,273 | 1.79 | |
| IND | Shambhudayal | 4,832 | 1.38 | |
| IND | Radhelal Agarwal | 2,647 | 0.75 | |
| IND | Anwar Hashmi Mohd. Usman | 2,488 | 0.71 | |
| Majority | | 5,080 | 1.45 | |
| Turnout | | 360,501 | 56.12 | |
| INC(I) gain from JP | | Swing | | |

=== 1977 ===
1977 Indian general election: Vidisha
| Party | Candidate | Votes | % | ±% |
|---|---|---|---|---|
| JP | Raghavji | 218,276 | 64.97 | |
| INC | Gufran Md. Azam | 94,542 | 28.14 | |
| IND | Radheyshyam | 15,664 | 4.66 | |
| IND | Babulal Sahu | 4,374 | 1.30 | |
| IND | Shakiluddin | 3,123 | 0.93 | |
| Majority | | 123,734 | 36.83 | |
| Turnout | | 354,506 | 60.35 | |
| JP gain from ABJS | | Swing | | |

=== 1971 ===
1971 Indian general election: Vidisha
| Party | Candidate | Votes | % | ±% |
|---|---|---|---|---|
| ABJS | Ramnath Geonka | 151,386 | 52.04 | |
| INC | Manibhai J. Patel | 119,322 | 41.02 | |
| IND | Mansharam | 15,421 | 5.30 | |
| IND | Thakurdas Pesumal | 4,789 | 1.65 | |
| Majority | | 32,064 | 11.02 | |
| Turnout | | 307,734 | 55.59 | |
| ABJS hold | | Swing | | |

=== 1967 ===
1967 Indian general election: Vidisha
| Party | Candidate | Votes | % | ±% |
|---|---|---|---|---|
| ABJS | Pandit Shiv Sharma | 158,105 | 57.20 | |
| INC | R. Pandey | 93,168 | 33.70 | |
| IND | B. Singh | 12,698 | 4.59 | |
| IND | M. Vyas | 12,458 | 4.51 | |
| Majority | | 64,937 | 23.49 | |
| Turnout | | 291,220 | 57.26 | |
| ABJS win (new seat) | | | | |

== See also ==
- Vidisha district
- List of constituencies of the Lok Sabha

== Notes ==
Lok Sabha
| Preceded by Gandhinagar | Constituency represented by the leader of the opposition 2009 – 2014 | Vacant till 2014; No Official opposition Title next held by Rae Bareli |
