= List of state highways in Madhya Pradesh =

The state highways are arterial routes of a state, linking district headquarters and important towns within the state and connecting them with national highways or Highways of the neighboring states.

== Summary ==
Madhya Pradesh state has a good road network. In 2021, there were 46 national highways with total length of 3,714 km and many state highways with total length of 8,728 km.

== Expressways ==
Expressways are listed from north to south and then east to west:

- Delhi–Mumbai Expressway (DME): 1,350 km (840 mi) long, 8-lane wide (expandable to 12-lane) access-controlled expressway connecting India's national capital New Delhi to its financial capital Mumbai. 244 km passes through Madhya Pradesh.
- Garoth-Indore Expressway: 190 kilometres (120 mi) long 4-lane expressway from Garoth on Delhi-Mumbai Expressway in Rajasthan to Indore via Barod, Ghatiya, Ujjain & Dewas, being connected by NHAI.
- Indore-Hyderabad Expressway: 713 kilometres (443 mi) long greenfield expressway from Indore to Hyderabad via MP (Barwaha & Burhanpur), Maharashtra (Akola, Washim, Hingoli, Kalamnuri, Nanded & Deglur) and Telangana (Jogipet & Sangareddy), expected to be completed by March 2025.
- Atal Progress-Way (Chambal Expressway): 404 km (251 mi) long, 4-lane (expandable to 6) access-controlled greenfield expressway, from Etawah in Uttar Pradesh to Kota in Rajasthan along eastern bank of Chambal River via Gwalior in Madhya Pradesh.
- Vindhya Expressway: proposed 660 km (410 mi) long, 6-lane, from Singrauli in the east to Bhopal in the west along Vindhya Range will connect six districts of the states, Bhopal, Sagar, Damoh, Katni, Rewa, Sidhi and Singrauli.
- Narmada Expressway: proposed 1,300 km (810 mi) long, 8-lane expressway entirely within Madhya Pradesh will connect Amarkantak in the eastern end of Madhya Pradesh via Dindori, Shahpura, Jabalpur, Narmadapuram, Barwaha and Alirajpur in the western end of Madhya Pradesh along the Narmada River. It will connect Gujarat with Chhattisgarh. Later, it will be extended from Alirajpur to Ahmedabad.

== List of new state highways in Madhya Pradesh (2017) ==
As of September 2017, this is the new list of state highways in Madhya Pradesh. This list is incomplete

State Highway No.	Route	Length	Passes through district(s)
MP SH 1	Porsa - Mehgaon - Mau - Pichhor - Chanderi	275 kilometres (171 mi)	Ashoknagar, Bhind, Datia, Morena, Shivpuri
MP SH 1A	Ater Approach Road	5 kilometres (3.1 mi)	Bhind
MP SH 2	Dabra - Picchor - Indargarh - Pandokhar	54 kilometres (34 mi)	Datia, Gwalior
MP SH 2A	Mohana - Patai - Ranighati - Chitoli	29 kilometres (18 mi)	Gwalior
MP SH 2B	Mihona - Gopalpur	9 kilometres (5.6 mi)	Bhind
MP SH 3	Gwalior - Chinor - Chimak - Bagwai - Bhitarwar - Karera - Sirsod - Picchore	124 kilometres (77 mi)	Gwalior, Shivpuri
MP SH 4	Lakwasa-Isagarh-Chanderi	76 kilometres (47 mi)	Ashoknagar, Shivpuri
MP SH 4A	Goras - Paron	36 kilometres (22 mi)	Sheopur
MP SH 5	Gaurihar - Chandla - Bachhon - Rajnagar - Khajuraho - Bameetha - Ganjdewra	116 kilometres (72 mi)	Chhatarpur
MP SH 6	Chitrakoot - Majhgawan - Satna - Maihar - Barhi - Khitoli - Parasi Mod	210 kilometres (130 mi)	Satna, Katni, Umaria
MP SH 7	Morwa - Neemuch - Manasa - Bhanpura - Jhalawar	171 kilometres (106 mi)	Neemuch, Mandsaur
MP SH 8	Bhanpura - Garoth - Mailkheda - Shyamgarh - Suwasara - Basai - Sitamau	96 kilometres (60 mi)	Mandsaur
MP SH 9	Dharwada - Vijaipur - Chainpur - Bharsula - Raghogarh - Aron - Bajidpur - Kachnar - Ashoknagar - Isagarh	133 kilometres (83 mi)	Ashoknagar, Guna
MP SH 10	Guna - Aron - Sironj - Berasia - Bhopal	193 kilometres (120 mi)	Bhopal, Guna, Vidisha
MP SH 11	Ashoknagar - Piprai - Mungaoli - Kanjia - Bina	75 kilometres (47 mi)	Ashoknagar, Sagar
MP SH 12	Jyora - Midhora - Lidhora - Jatara - Khargetigala - Palera - Garoli - Naugaon - Lugasi - Malhera - Lodi - Chandla	155 kilometres (96 mi)	Tikamgarh, Chhatarpur
MP SH 13	Sundara - Singpur - Kothi - Birsingpur - Semaria	86 kilometres (53 mi)	Panna, Rewa, Satna
MP SH 13A	Nagod - Unchera	36 kilometres (22 mi)	Satna
MP SH 14	Manikpur - Semaria - Rewa - Gaddi - Rampur Nekan - Tilwari - Hardi - Janakpur	196 kilometres (122 mi)	Rewa, Sidhi
MP SH 15	Bela - Govindgarh - Baghwar - Rampur - Churhat	57 kilometres (35 mi)	Rewa, Satna, Sidhi
MP SH 16	Taal, Gogapur, Mahidpur, Ghonsla, Tarana, Kanasia, Vijayganjmandi, Dewas	165 kilometres (103 mi)	Dewas, Ratlam, Ujjain
MP SH 17	Khilchipur - Chhapihed - Nalkhera - Kannad - Dhupada - Shajapur - Bercha - Sundarsi - Poliakam - Pipalrava - Gandharvapuri - Sonkatch	167 kilometres (104 mi)	Agar, Shajapur, Dewas
MP SH 18	Manohar Thana - Batawda - Mragwas - Badod - Kumbhraj - Khatakiya - Maksudangarh - Nazirabad - Berasia	164 kilometres (102 mi)	Bhopal, Guna
MP SH 19	Jaruakheda - Bandri - Barhol - Banda - Kherbana - Batiyagarh - Hatta	130 kilometres (81 mi)	Damoh, Sagar
MP SH 20	Sagar - Jaisinagar - Silwani - Udaipura - Gadarwara	143 kilometres (89 mi)	Narsinghpur district, Sagar, Raisen
MP SH 21	Sagar - Rehli - Tendukheda	102 kilometres (63 mi)	Sagar, Damoh
MP SH 21A	Patan - Shahpura	15 kilometres (9.3 mi)	Jabalpur
MP SH 22	Kherbana - Garahkota - Rehli - Chandpur - Deori - Sahajpur - Sallabaruu - Pratapgarh - Chandanpipliya - Bhanpur - Chunetia - Ghatkhedi - Pipliakewat - Noniyabareli	189 kilometres (117 mi)	Damoh, Raisen, Sagar
MP SH 23	Dargawan - Patera - Hata - Kumhari - Raipura - Salaiya - Sihora	164 kilometres (102 mi)	Chhatarpur, Damoh, Jabalpur, Katni
MP SH 24	Itma - Amarpatan - Satna - Kripalpur - Tikuri - Semaria - Farhad - Sirmaur - Kyoti - Lalgawan - Katra - Mauganj - Sidhi - Beohari	304 kilometres (189 mi)	Rewa, Satna, Shahdol, Sidhi Umaria
MP SH 25	Jaora - Alot - Sarangpur - Akodia - Sujalpur	190 kilometres (120 mi)	Ratlam, Agarmalwa, Shajapur, Rajgarh
MP SH 26	Nagda - Khachrod - Ratlam - Thandla - Jhabua - Jobat - Bagh	223 kilometres (139 mi)	Alirajpur, Dhar, Jhabua, Ratlam, Ujjain
MP SH 26A	Thandla - Kushalgarh	12 kilometres (7.5 mi)	Jhabua
MP SH 26B	Unhel - Ujjain	29 kilometres (18 mi)	Ujjain
MP SH 27	Ingoriya - Depalpur - Ushapur - Indore	68 kilometres (42 mi)	Indore, Ujjain
MP SH 28	Sanchi - Bhopal - Sehora - Ashta - Sonkatch - Dewas	177 kilometres (110 mi)	Bhopal, Dewas, Raisen, Sehore
MP SH 29	Vidisha - Ahmedpur - Gadi - Gairatganj	50 kilometres (31 mi)	Raisen, Vidisha
MP SH 29A	Gadi - Raisen	45 kilometres (28 mi)	Raisen
MP SH 29B	Naktara - Sultanpur	27 kilometres (17 mi)	Raisen
MP SH 29C	Badi - Baktara - Shahganj - Budhni	59 kilometres (37 mi)	Raisen, Sehore
MP SH 29D	Shahganj - Barkheda	19 kilometres (12 mi)	Raisen, Sehore
MP SH 30	Gyaraspur - Haidergarh - Begamganj - Sultanganj - Siyarmau - Tada - Kesli - Gaurjhamar	111 kilometres (69 mi)	Raisen, Sagar, Vidisha
MP SH 31	Salabaru - Deori - Gorakhpur - Sadrai - Hirapur - Gadarwara	66 kilometres (41 mi)	Narsinghpur, Raisen
MP SH 32	Maharajpur (Sagar) - Sahajpur - Tendukheda - Gadarwara	74 kilometres (46 mi)	Narsinghpur, Sagar
MP SH 33	Pali - Birsinghpur - Shahpura - Niwas - Mandla - Lakhnadon	229 kilometres (142 mi)	Dindori, Mandla, Sidhi, Umaria
MP SH 33A	Chiraidongri - Kanha	34 kilometres (21 mi)	Mandla
MP SH 34	Budhar - Amarkantak	82 kilometres (51 mi)	Anuppur
MP SH 35	Kotma - Rajendragram - Lilatola	78 kilometres (48 mi)	Anuppur
MP SH 36	Kheda - Katthiwada - Bhabara - Tanda - Gandhwani - Manawar - Khalghat - Maheshwar - Barwaha	261 kilometres (162 mi)	Alirajpur, Dhar, Khargone
MP SH 36A	Omkareshwar - Sanawad - Punasa	58 kilometres (36 mi)	Khandwa, Khargone
MP SH 37	Bandheri - Manawar - Rajpur - Palsud - Niwali	133 kilometres (83 mi)	Barwani, Dhar
MP SH 37A	Anjad - Julwania	29 kilometres (18 mi)	Barwani
MP SH 38	Nagda, Ghatabillod - Mhow - Mandleshwar - Kasrawad	127 kilometres (79 mi)	Dhar, Khargone, Indore
MP SH 38A	Rau - Mhow	8 kilometres (5.0 mi)	Indore
MP SH 39	Lunhera - Mandav - Tarapur - Manawar - Singhana - Chikalda - Barwani - Khetia	181 kilometres (112 mi)	Barwani, Dhar
MP SH 39A	Barwani - Palsud - Sendhwa	57 kilometres (35 mi)	Barwani
MP SH 40	Lebad - Manpur	34 kilometres (21 mi)	Dhar, Indore
MP SH 41	Harrai - Tamia - Junnardeo - Multai - Athner - Kukrukhamla	283 kilometres (176 mi)	Betul, Chhindwara
MP SH 41A	Matkuli - Pachmarhi	28 kilometres (17 mi)	Narmadapuram
MP SH 42	Nainpur - Seoni - Katangi - Paraswara - Tumsa	146 kilometres (91 mi)	Balaghat, Mandla, Seoni
MP SH 43	Dindori - Samnapur - Bicchiya	82 kilometres (51 mi)	Mandla, Dindori
MP SH 44	Gadsarai - Pandaria	45 kilometres (28 mi)	Dindori
MP SH 45	Athner - Betul - Ghodadongry - Sarni - Junnardeo - Parasia	164 kilometres (102 mi)	Betul, Chhindwara
MP SH 46	Bandol Junction - Chourai - Chand - Biccchua - Lodhikheda - Saikheda	160 kilometres (99 mi)	Chhindwara, Seoni
MP SH 47	Balaghat - Chilpi	130 kilometres (81 mi)	Balaghat
MP SH 48	Saletkari - Birsa - Paraswada - Lalbarra - Waraseoni - Garrachoki	172 kilometres (107 mi)	Balaghat
MP SH 49	Burhanpur - Dedtalai	67 kilometres (42 mi)	Balaghat

== List of state highways in Madhya Pradesh (2009) ==
State highway №	Route	Passes Through–District(s)	Length (in km) 60 km
MP SH 1	Mhow-Bargonda-Jamgate-Choli-Mandleshwar-Kasrawad-Khargone	Indore, Khargone	95.00
MP SH 2	Urai–Gopalpur (Uttar Pradesh)–Milhona–Ater–Porsa–Morena–Sabalgarh–Karoli–To Rajasthan Border		247.20
MP SH 6	Shivpuri–Sheopur–Sawai Madhopur–To Rajasthan Border	Shivpuri, Sheopur	143.60
MP SH 9	Manikpur (Uttar Pradesh)–Rewa–Shahdol–Pandaria–To Chhattisgarh Border	Rewa, Umaria, Shahdol, Dindori	400.48
MP SH 9A	Shahdol–Amarkantak	Shahdol, Anuppur	81.60
MP SH 10	Ramanulganj (Chhattisgarh)–Jaisinghnagar–Barhi–Katni–Amanganj–Bijawar–Beldeogarh–Tikamgarh–Crosses State Border In to Uttar Pradesh–Lalitpur (Uttar Pradesh)–Crosses State Border In to Madhya Pradesh–Chanderi–Isagarh–Lukwasa–Merges in to NH 3	Chhatarpur, Tikamgarh, Katni, Lalitpur etc.	562.50
MP SH 11	Gondia (Maharashtra)–Balaghat–Nainpur–Mandla Chabi–Shahpura–Umaria–Panpatha–Satna–Chitrakoot	Balaghat, Mandla, Dindori, Umaria, Satna	528.10
MP SH 11A	Seoni–Nainpur–Mandla	Seoni, Mandla	72.80
MP SH 11B	Chiraidongri–Kanha	Mandla	34.00
MP SH 14	Katni–Damoh–Sagar–Bina–Biaora Khilchipur–Jirapur–Susner (Rajasthan)–Mandsaur–Pratapgarh (Rajasthan)	Katni, Damoh, Sagar, Vidisha, Rajgarh, Agar, Mandsaur	500.40
MP SH 15	Sagar–Jaisinagar–Silwani–Bareli–Shahganj–Budhni–Narmadapuram–Harda–Ashapur–Khandwa	Sagar, Raisen, Sehore, Narmadapuram, Harda, Khandwa	362.90
MP SH 15A	Sagar–Rehli	Sagar	42.20
MP SH 18	Bhopal–Sehore–Ashta–Dewas–Ujjain–Badnawar–Petlawad–Ahemadabad (Gujarat)	Bhopal, Sehore, Dewas, Ujjain, Dhar, Jhabua	362.30
MP SH 19	Jaithpur (Uttar Pradesh)–Bhind– Mehgaon_ Mau_ Seondha–Datia–Pichhor–Mungaoli–Kurwai–Vidisha–Salamtpur–Bareli–Chhindwara–Nagpur (Maharashtra)		743.40
MP SH 19A	Matkuli–Pachmarhi	Narmadapuram	28.00
MP SH 22	Sandalpur–Nasrullanganj–Narmadapuram–Pipariya–Gadarwara–Narsinghpur–Jabalpur–Shahpura–Dindori–Kabir Chabuthra (Chhattisgarh)	Sehore, Narmadapuram, Narsinghpur, Jabalpur, Dindori	530.10
MP SH 23	Sabalgarh–Birpur–Goras–Paron–Guna–Sironj–Bersia–Bhopal		399.20
MP SH 26	Chipli (Chhattisgarh)–Balaghat–Seoni–Chhindwara–Multai–Betil–Khandwa–Khargone–Barwani–Alirajpur–Baroda (Gujarat)	Balaghat, Seoni, Chhindwara, Betul, Khandwa, Khargone, Barwani, Dhar, Alirajpur	692.20
MP SH 27	(Rajasthan)–Dongargaon, Agar Malwa–Soyat–Agar–Ujjain–Indore–Barwaha– Sanawad–Burhanpur–Malkapur (Maharashtra)	Agar, Ujjain, Indore, Khargone, Khandwa, Burhanpur	386.60
MP SH 31	Paal–Bhusawal (Maharashtra)–Chiriya-Bistan-Khargone-Khalghat-Gujri-Dhar–Badnawar–Ratlam–Jaora-Mandsaur–Neemuch–Nayagaon-Nimbahera-Chittorgarh (Rajasthan)	Neemuch, Mandsaur, Ratlam, Dhar, Khargone	402.57
MP SH 31A	Neemuch–Manasa–Bhanpura–Jhalawad (Rajasthan)–Up to Madhya Pradesh Border	Neemuch, Mandsaur	140.40
MP SH 36	Sendhwa to Khetia	Barwani	57.00
MP SH 37	Starts on NH 76 from Jhansi (up to Niwari MP SH 37 and NH 76 is common)–Orcha (common on NH 76)–Niwari/Niwari district–Tikamgarh–DAMOH–JABALPUR		321.80
MP SH 37A	Jabalpur–Patan–Shahpura		50.00
MP SH 38	Bandheri (NH 59)–Manawar–Khalghat–Dhamnod- –Barwaha		145.00
MP SH 39	Sendhwa–Badwani–Kukshi–Jobat–Jhabua–		149.00
MP SH 39A	Thandla–Kushalgarh		22.00
MP SH 40	Dindori–Mandla–Lakhnadagon		134.40
MP SH 41	Kannod–Astha–Shujalpur–Sarangpur–Agar		170.00
MP SH 41A	Khandwa–Mundi–Punasa–Kannod–Astha–Shujalpur		230.00
MP SH 42	Naktara–Dehgaon–Gairatganj–Begamganj–Rahatgarh–Khurai–Malthon		160.00
MP SH 43	Betul–Paratwada (Maharashtra)–Up to Madhya Pradesh Border		67.80
MP SH 44	Gairatganj–Silwani –Udaipura–Saikheda–Gadarwara		85.00
MP SH 45	Mihona–lahar–Bhandar (NH 25)–Up to Madhya Pradesh Border		100.00
MP SH 47	Chhindwara–Amarwada–Nasinghpur–Up To NH 26		115.00
MP SH 49	Damoh–Hata–Amanganj–Panna–Ajaygarh–Naraini (Uttar Pradesh)–Up to Madhya Pradesh Border		165.00
MP SH 50	Khandwa–Dedtalai–Burhanpur		116.00
MP SH 51	Shujalpur–Pachore–Kujner–Jirapur–Soyat–Jhalawad		180.00
MP SH 51A	Shujalpur–Kothri–Ichhawar		70.00
MP SH 52	Bela–Govindgarh–Rampur–Churhat		63.50
MP SH 53	Rajmilan–Sarai–Niwas–Sidhi(NH 39)–Kamarji–Mauganj(NH 135)–Naigarhi–Katra(NH 30)		

== See also ==
- Expressways of India
- National highways of India
  - List of national highways in India
- Indian Railways
- List of airports in India
- Transport in India
