= State Highway 39A (Madhya Pradesh) =

Road in Madhya Pradesh, India

State Highway 39A

Route information
- Maintained by MPRDC

Major junctions
- South end: Thandla
- North end: Kushalgarh (Rajasthan border)

Location
- Country: India
- State: Madhya Pradesh

Highway system
- Roads in India; Expressways; National; State; Asian; State Highways in Madhya Pradesh

Madhya Pradesh State Highway 39A (MP SH 39) is a branch line of MP SH-39) running from Thandla town till Kushalgarh at the Madhya Pradesh-Rajasthan border.

== See also ==
- List of state highways in Madhya Pradesh
- Madhya Pradesh Road Development Corporation Limited
