= Narmada Expressway =

Proposed expressway in Madhya Pradesh, India

Route information
- Length: 1,300 km (810 mi)

Major junctions
- East end: Amarkantak
- West end: Alirajpur

Location
- Country: India
- State: Madhya Pradesh

Highway system
- Roads in India; Expressways; National; State; Asian; State Highways in Madhya Pradesh

Narmada Expressway is a proposed eight-lane expressway in the state of Madhya Pradesh. The proposed expressway will connect the historic towns of Amarkantak in the eastern end of Madhya Pradesh via Dindori, Shahpura, Jabalpur, Narmadapuram, Barwaha and Alirajpur in the western end of Madhya Pradesh alongside the Narmada River. The expressway measures 1,300 km. It will connect Gujarat with Chhattisgarh. Later, this road will be extended to connect Alirajpur to Ahmedabad.

== Connecting cities ==
- Amarkantak
- Dindori
- Shahpura
- Dindori
- Jabalpur
- Narsinghpur
- Pipariya
- Punasa
- Narmadapuram
- Seoni Malwa
- Harda
- Khirkiya
- Harsud
- Khandwa
- Bhikangaon
- Khargone
- Barwani
- Kukshi
- Alirajpur
- Ujjain

Narmada Expressway connects 13 districts in Madhya Pradesh.

== Status updates ==
- May 2020: Narmada expressway project to be revived.
- Jun 2021: Madhya Pradesh chief minister asks officials to expedite land acquisition of the expressway.
- Feb 2022: Madhya Pradesh's cabinet has approved the 906 kms long Narmada Expressway project.

== See also ==
- Expressways of India
- National highways of India
- List of national highways in India
- Indian Railways
- List of airports in India
- Transport in India
