= State Highway 39 (Madhya Pradesh) =

State highway in Madhya Pradesh, India

State Highway 39

Route information
- Maintained by MPRDC

Major junctions
- South end: Sendhwa
- Barwani, Kukshi, Bagh, Jobat, Jhabua
- North end: Thandla

Location
- Country: India
- State: Madhya Pradesh

Highway system
- Roads in India; Expressways; National; State; Asian; State Highways in Madhya Pradesh

Madhya Pradesh State Highway 39 (MP SH 39) is a State Highway running from Sendhwa town in Barwani district lying near NH-52 till Thandla town.

It passes through Barwani, Kukshi, Bagh, Jobat and Jhabua.

== See also ==
- List of state highways in Madhya Pradesh
- Madhya Pradesh Road Development Corporation Limited
