= Vidisha Assembly constituency =

Constituency of the Madhya Pradesh legislative assembly in India

Coordinates: 23.52°N 77.81°E

Vidisha
- Constituency No. 144 for the Madhya Pradesh Legislative Assembly

Constituency details
- Country: India
- Region: Central India
- State: Madhya Pradesh
- District: Vidisha
- Lok Sabha constituency: Vidisha
- Established: 1957
- Total electors: 203,390
- Reservation: None

Member of Legislative Assembly
- 16th Madhya Pradesh Legislative Assembly
- Incumbent Mukesh Tandan
- Party: Bharatiya Janata Party
- Elected year: 2023
- Preceded by: Shashank Bhargava

Vidisha Assembly constituency Vidhan Sabha seat is one of the 230 Vidhan Sabha (Legislative Assembly) constituencies of Madhya Pradesh state in central India. This constituency came into existence in 1957, as one of the Vidhan Sabha constituencies of Madhya Pradesh state. Presently INC's Shashank Bhargava is the MLA from this constituency. He was preceded by Kalyan Singh Thakur in 2014 when the by-election for this seat was held in 2014 after CM of Madhya Pradesh Shivraj Singh Chouhan resigned from this constituency post registering victory at two seats Budhni and Vidisha Assembly constituency.

== Overview ==
Vidisha (constituency number 144) is one of the 5 Vidhan Sabha constituencies located in Vidisha district. This constituency presently covers the entire Vidisha tehsil of the district with 141, and entire Gulabganj tehsil's 75 villages.

It is a segment of Vidisha (Lok Sabha constituency) along with seven other Vidhan Sabha segments namely Basoda in Vidisha district; Bhojpur, Sanchi and Silwani in Raisen district; Budhni, Ichhawar in Sehore District; Khategaon in Dewas district.

== Members of Legislative Assembly ==
Year	Name	Party
1957	Hiralal Pippal	Indian National Congress
1962	Gore Lal	Hindu Mahasabha
1967	S. Singh	Bharatiya Jana Sangh
1972	Surya Prakash	Indian National Congress
1977	Narsinghdas Goyal	Janata Party
1980	Mohar Singh Thakur	Bharatiya Janata Party
1985	Mohar Singh Thakur	Bharatiya Janata Party
1990	Mohar Singh Thakur	Bharatiya Janata Party
1993	Mohar Singh Thakur	Bharatiya Janata Party
1998	Sushila Devi Thakur	Bharatiya Janata Party
2003	Gurucharan Singh	Bharatiya Janata Party
2008	Raghav Ji	Bharatiya Janata Party
2013	Shivraj Singh Chouhan	Bharatiya Janata Party
2013^	Kalyan Singh Thakur	Bharatiya Janata Party
2018	Shashank Bhargava	Indian National Congress
2023	Mukesh Tandan	Bharatiya Janata Party

- By-Poll

== Election results ==
=== 2023 ===
2023 Madhya Pradesh Legislative Assembly election: Vidisha
Party	Candidate	Votes	%	±%
BJP	Mukesh Tandan	99,246	56.31	+13.9
INC	Shashank Bhargava	72,436	41.1	−11.41
NOTA	None of the above	1,323	0.75	−0.23
Majority		26,810	15.21	+5.11
Turnout		176,250	77.96	+2.74
BJP gain from INC		Swing		

=== 2018 ===
2018 Madhya Pradesh Legislative Assembly election: Vidisha
Party	Candidate	Votes	%	±%
INC	Shashank Bhargava	80,332	52.51	
BJP	Mukesh Tandon	64,878	42.41	
Sapaks Party	Rakesh Sharma	2,569	1.68	
NOTA	None of the above	1,492	0.98	
Majority		15,454	10.1	
Turnout		152,994	75.22	
INC gain from BJP		Swing		
