= State Highway 1 (Madhya Pradesh) =

Road in Madhya Pradesh, India

State Highway 1

Major junctions
- North end: Rau
- Dr. Ambedkar Nagar, Gawli Palasia, Jam Gate
- South end: Mandleshwar

Location
- Country: India
- State: Madhya Pradesh

Highway system
- Roads in India; Expressways; National; State; Asian; State Highways in Madhya Pradesh

Madhya Pradesh State Highway 1 (MP SH 1) is State Highway running from Rau till Mandleshwar. It is popularly known as Mhow-Mandleshwar Road.

It travels through dense forests and has various places of tourism interest along the route. Jam Gate being one of them. It is a historic Gate built by erstwhile rulers which looks upon the Ghats and Valleys.

== See also ==
- List of state highways in Madhya Pradesh
