= State Highway 26 (Madhya Pradesh) =

Road in Madhya Pradesh, India

State Highway 26

Major junctions
- East end: Chilphi (Chhattisgarh border)
- Balaghat, Seoni, Chhindwara, Multai, Betul, Khandwa, Khargone, Julwania, Barwani, Kukshi, Alirajpur
- West end: Chandpur (Gujarat border)

Location
- Country: India
- State: Madhya Pradesh

Highway system
- Roads in India; Expressways; National; State; Asian; State Highways in Madhya Pradesh

Madhya Pradesh State Highway 26 (MP SH 26) is a State Highway running from Khategaon till Amarkantak. It is popularly known as Jabalpur Road.

It passes through the width of the entire state via Balaghat, Seoni, Chhindwara, Multai, Betul, Khandwa, Khargone, Julwania, Barwani, Kukshi and Alirajpur.

== See also ==
- List of state highways in Madhya Pradesh
