= State Highway 18 (Madhya Pradesh) =

State highway in Madhya Pradesh, India

State Highway 18

Major junctions
- East end: Bhopal
- Sehore, Ashta, Sonkatch, Dewas, Ujjain, Barnagar, Badnawar, Petlawad, Thandla
- West end: Limdi (Gujarat Border)

Location
- Country: India
- State: Madhya Pradesh

Highway system
- Roads in India; Expressways; National; State; Asian; State Highways in Madhya Pradesh

Madhya Pradesh State Highway 18 (MP SH 18) is State Highway running from Bhopal till Limdi via Thandla. It is popularly known as Bhopal Road.

It passes through the religious center of Ujjain, the industrial city Dewas till the Gujarat Border via Thandla.

== See also ==
- List of state highways in Madhya Pradesh
