= State Highway 9 (Madhya Pradesh) =

State highway in Madhya Pradesh, India

State Highway 9

Major junctions
- North end: Manikpur UP border
- Semaria
- South end: Rewa

Location
- Country: India
- State: Madhya Pradesh

Highway system
- Roads in India; Expressways; National; State; Asian; State Highways in Madhya Pradesh

Madhya Pradesh State Highway 9 (MP SH 9) is a State Highway running from Manikpur, Uttar Pradesh via Semaria town in Rewa district and terminating at Rewa, Madhya Pradesh.

== See also ==
- List of state highways in Madhya Pradesh
