= State Highway 27 (Madhya Pradesh) =

Highway in Madhya Pradesh, India

State Highway 27

Route information
- Length: 386.60 km (240.22 mi)

Major junctions
- North end: Dongarabad
- Agar, Ujjain, Indore, Sanawad, Barwaha, Burhanpur
- South end: Icchapur

Location
- Country: India
- State: Madhya Pradesh

Highway system
- Roads in India; Expressways; National; State; Asian; State Highways in Madhya Pradesh

Madhya Pradesh State Highway 27 (MP SH 27) runs in Jhalawar in Rajasthan, Ujjain in Madhya Pradesh and Malkapur in Maharashtra it cover 386.60 km.

It starts from Rajasthan and has a route as Jhalawar. It enters Madhya Pradesh from Dongargaon and passes through Agar, Ujjain, Indore, Sanawad, Barwaha, Burhanpur and the enter in Maharashtra from Malkapur.
