= State Highway 13 (Madhya Pradesh) =

State highway in Madhya Pradesh, India

State Highway 13

Route information
- Length: 86 km (53 mi)

Major junctions
- East end: Sundara
- Singpur, Kothi, Birsingpur
- West end: Semaria

Location
- Country: India
- State: Madhya Pradesh

Highway system
- Roads in India; Expressways; National; State; Asian; State Highways in Madhya Pradesh

Madhya Pradesh State Highway 13 (MP SH 13) is a State Highway running from Sundara via Singpur, Kothi, Birsingpur till Semaria town. It is alternatively known as Birsinghpur Main Road.

It connects the districts of Panna, Satna, Rewa of Madhya Pradesh covering a total distance of 86 kilometers.

In 2017, SH 13 was defined.

== See also ==
- List of state highways in Madhya Pradesh
