= State Highway 36 (Madhya Pradesh) =

State highway in Madhya Pradesh, India

State Highway 36

Major junctions
- East end: Sendhwa
- Niwali, Pansemal
- West end: Khetia (Maharashtra Border)

Location
- Country: India
- State: Madhya Pradesh

Highway system
- Roads in India; Expressways; National; State; Asian; State Highways in Madhya Pradesh

Madhya Pradesh State Highway 36 (MP SH 36) is a state highway running from Sendhwa in the Barwani district to Khetia (the Madhya Pradesh-Maharashtra border). It passes through Niwali and Pansemal.

== See also ==
- List of state highways in Madhya Pradesh
