= Basoda Assembly constituency =

Constituency of the Madhya Pradesh legislative assembly in India

Coordinates: 23.85°N 77.94°E

Basoda
- Constituency No. 145 for the Madhya Pradesh Legislative Assembly

Constituency details
- Country: India
- Region: Central India
- State: Madhya Pradesh
- District: Vidisha
- Lok Sabha constituency: Vidisha
- Established: 1962
- Reservation: None

Member of Legislative Assembly
- 16th Madhya Pradesh Legislative Assembly
- Incumbent Hari Singh Raghuwanshi
- Party: Bharatiya Janata Party
- Elected year: 2023
- Preceded by: Leena Sanjay Jain

Basoda Assembly constituency is one of the 230 Vidhan Sabha (Legislative Assembly) constituencies of Madhya Pradesh state in central India. This constituency came into existence in 1962, as one of the Vidhan Sabha constituencies of Madhya Pradesh state.

== Overview ==
Basoda (constituency number 145) is one of the 5 Vidhan Sabha constituencies located in Vidisha district. This constituency presently covers some of the Basoda tehsil's villages of the district with 98, Gyaraspur tehsil's 132 villages and Tyonda tehsil's 104 villages. It has total 232 polling booths. Total Voters in the constituency are 1,78,486.

Basoda is part of Vidisha Lok Sabha constituency along with seven other Vidhan Sabha segments namely Vidisha in Vidisha district; Bhojpur, Sanchi and Silwani in Raisen district; Budhni, Ichhawar in Sehore District; Khategaon in Dewas district.

== Members of Legislative Assembly ==
Election	Member	Party
1962	Ram Singh	Indian National Congress
1967	H. Pippal	Bharatiya Jana Sangh
1972	Sita Ram	Bharatiya Jana Sangh
1977	Jamna Prasad Beharilal	Janata Party
1980	Phool Chand Verma	Bharatiya Janata Party
1985	Veersingh Raghuvanshi	Indian National Congress
1990	Ajaya Singh Raghuvanshi	Bharatiya Janata Party
1993	Ramnarayan Munnilal	Indian National Congress
1998	Veer Singh Raghuvanshi	Indian National Congress
2003	Hari Singh Raghuwanshi	Bharatiya Janata Party
2008	Hari Singh Raghuwanshi	Bharatiya Janata Party
2013	Nishank Kumar Jain	Indian National Congress
2018	Leena Sanjay Jain	Bharatiya Janata Party
2023	Hari Singh Raghuwanshi	Bharatiya Janata Party

== Election results ==
=== 2023 ===
2023 Madhya Pradesh Legislative Assembly election: Basoda
Party	Candidate	Votes	%	±%
BJP	Hari Singh Raghuwanshi	98,722	56.33	+6.05
INC	Nishank Kumar Jain	71,055	40.55	−2.73
Vastavik Bharat Party	Ashok Lalaram Kushwah	1,787	1.02	
NOTA	None of the above	1,092	0.62	−0.21
Majority		27,667	15.78	+8.78
Turnout		175,246	82.52	+5.46
BJP hold		Swing		

=== 2018 ===
2018 Madhya Pradesh Legislative Assembly election: Basoda
Party	Candidate	Votes	%	±%
BJP	Leena Sanjay Jain	73,520	50.28	
INC	Nishank Kumar Jain	63,294	43.28	
Sapaks Party	Ravindra Singh Raghuwanshi	2,529	1.73	
BSP	Chetan Kumar Ahirwar	1,690	1.16	
NOTA	None of the above	1,220	0.83	
Majority		10,226	7.0	
Turnout		146,231	77.06	
BJP gain from INC		Swing		

=== 2013 ===
M. P. Legislative Assembly Election, 2013: Basoda
Party	Candidate	Votes	%	±%
INC	Nishank Kumar Jain	68,002	51.72	
BJP	Hari Singh Raghuwanshi	51843	39.43	
BSP	Hari	7053	5.36	N/A
Independent (politician)	Ganesh Ram Lodhi	777	0.59	
Independent	Shailendra Saxena	706	0.54	
Independent	Ram Dayal Kori	514	0.39	
Independent	Rajendra Tiwari	443	0.34	
Independent	Hakam Singh Lodhi	393	0.30	
NOTA	None of the Above	1750	1.33	
Majority				
Turnout		131481	74.50	
Swing to INC from BJP		Swing		
