= Pratap Bhanu Sharma =

Indian politician

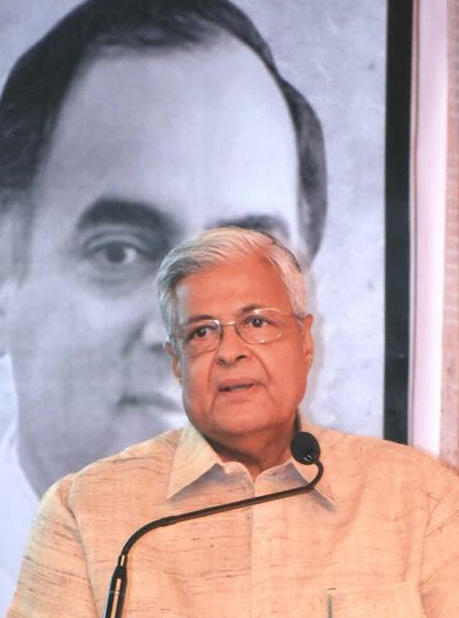
- Pratap Bhanu Sharma 2013

Member of Parliament, Lok Sabha
- Preceded by: Raghavji
- Constituency: Vidisha, Madhya Pradesh
- In office 1984–1989
- Preceded by: Raghavji
- Succeeded by: Raghavji
- Constituency: Vidisha, Madhya Pradesh
- In office 1980–1984
- Preceded by: Raghavji
- Succeeded by: Raghavji
- Constituency: Vidisha, Madhya Pradesh

Personal details
- Born: 6 March 1947 (age 79) Vidisha, Central Provinces and Berar, British India
- Party: Indian National Congress
- Education: Samrat Ashok Technological Institute

Pratap Bhanu Sharma (born 6 March 1947) is an Indian politician and a senior leader of the Indian National Congress. He has been member of the 7th and 8th Lok Sabha (Lower House of the Indian Parliament) from Vidisha, Madhya Pradesh. He was defeated in the subsequent elections and is standing for the forthcoming elections to Lok Sabha. Mechanical Engineer, industrialist and educationalist, he has also undertaken various social activities including implementing rural development program etc.

== Political career ==
Sharma has been President of Madhya Pradesh Indian National Congress between 1975 and 1976, District Small Scale Industries Organisation and District Chamber of Commerce and Industry. He has also been Chairman of Madhya Pradesh Lahu-Udyog Engineers Association between 1975–80 and Small Industries Development Society in 1980. He was elected as Member of Parliament in 1980 and 1984 from Vidisha Lok Sabha constituency. He is currently Vice President of the Madhya Pradesh Indian National Congress/ Youth Congress.
