= State Highway 4 (Madhya Pradesh) =

Road in Madhya Pradesh, India

State Highway 4

Major junctions
- North end: Lakwasa
- Isagarh, Piprod
- South end: Chanderi

Location
- Country: India
- State: Madhya Pradesh

Highway system
- Roads in India; Expressways; National; State; Asian; State Highways in Madhya Pradesh

Madhya Pradesh State Highway 4 (MP SH 4) is a state highway running from Lakwasa till Chanderi via Isagarh and Piprod.

The highway connects towns in Northern Madhya Pradesh. Chanderi is an important town for textile industries.

== See also ==
- List of state highways in Madhya Pradesh
