= Madhya Pradesh Road Development Corporation Limited =

Economic development agency

Coordinates: 23.2385583°N 77.4262333°E

- मध्य प्रदेश सड़क विकास निगम लिमिटेड
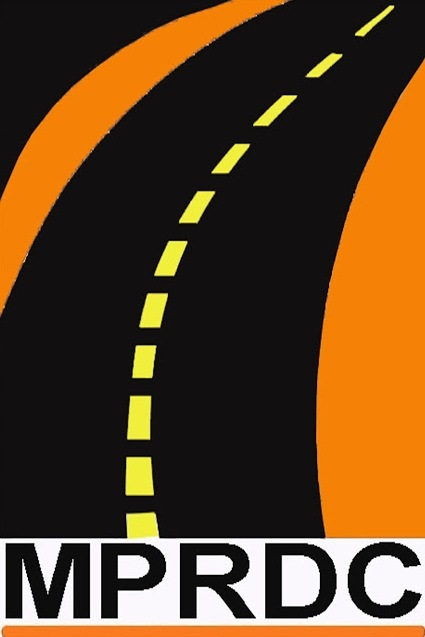
- Abbreviation: MPRDC
- Formation: 2004
- Type: Undertaking of Government of Madhya Pradesh & State Highway Authority of Madhya Pradesh
- Legal status: Active
- Purpose: Development and maintenance of State Highways, Major District Roads and Expressway in the State of Madhya Pradesh
- Headquarters: Bhopal, Madhya Pradesh
- Location: India
- Region served: India
- Services: Road development and Infrastructure of Madhya Pradesh
- Official language: Hindi, English
- Owner: Government of Madhya Pradesh
- Managing Director: Bharat Yadav, IAS
- Main organ: Board of Directors
- Parent organisation: Wholly Government owned company of Government of Madhya Pradesh
- Website: www.mprdc.gov.in

The Madhya Pradesh Road Development Corporation Limited (MPRDC) is an Undertaking of Government of the state of Madhya Pradesh, India, responsible for management of a network of over 22,000 km of National Highways, State Highways and Major District Roads in Madhya Pradesh. Madhya Pradesh State has a good road network. There are 20 National Highways with total length of 4,000 km and many State Highways with total length of 9,000 km. Shri. Mohan yadav, Chief Minister of Madhya Pradesh is the Chairman, while Shri Bharat Yadav, IAS is Managing Director of MPRDC.

== History ==
Madhya Pradesh Road Development Corporation Ltd. (MPRDC) was incorporated as a wholly government owned company under The Companies Act 1956; as amended by The Companies (Amendment) Act 2002 and The Companies (Second Amendment) Act 2002, by the Government with an authorized share capital of ₹20 Crore, paid up share capital of ₹10 Crore. The Company has received a Certificate of Incorporation and Certificate of Commencement of Business from the Registrar of Companies, Madhya Pradesh and Chhattisgarh in July 2014 and August 11, 2004 respectively. Presently paid up share capital of Company is ₹20 Crore. It is responsible for the development, maintenance and management of State Highways, Major District Roads and Expressway in the State of Madhya Pradesh, totaling over 14,004 km (8,702 mi) in length. The MPRDC is also responsible of the toll collection on several State highways.

== Role of MPRDC in Infrastructure Development of Madhya Pradesh ==
The Economy of Madhya Pradesh was considered as one of the most "sick" economies of India till 2003, after 2005 it registered consistent growth rate and it reached India's top-most state in terms of GDP growth, with a rate of 12% GDP for annual year 2011–12. Madhya Pradesh received an award from President Pranab Mukherjee in January 2013 for improving its tourism, medical and infrastructural growth. GDP growth is 19.7% for 2017-18. After incorporation of MPRDC, condition of Road infrastructure has improved in the State.

Officials from other States are coming to study its work pattern and exchange notes with its officers. Officers from around a dozen States have visited the Corporation's HQ and its field offices. It has received Department of Economic Affairs, Ministry of Finance, Government of India & ADB 2017 Best Performing Project Award for the Madhya Pradesh District Connectivity Sector Project.

=== First to launch e-tolling ===
In selected highways, the corporation has started e-tolling. The regular users of the road have been given e-tokens. Due to this they don't have to stop at toll booths, thus saving both time and fuel. Vehicle having e-tag is identified by the scanner installed at the toll booth and the toll booth barrier opens automatically and the vehicles passes without stopping.

=== Accident response system ===
Implementation of Accident response system (ARS) on PPP mode is probably the first in world. Statewide implementation of ARS will be the first in country. ARS will address safety requirements in the larger perspective. Technical assistance through Asian Development Bank for capacity building in road safety. Accident Response System & Traffic Management Centre in Madhya Pradesh, including operation and maintenance, for five years with an estimated cost of ₹12.50 crore have been proposed. A Road Safety Cell is created in MPRDC. The MPRDC has engaged an agency for ARS on annuity basis. ARS includes centralised call centre, GIS based automatic vehicle tracking system (AVTS), computer aided dispatch system, traffic management centre.

== Projects ==
=== Projects Completed ===
- State Highways: At an estimated cost of ₹121.1 Billion 9,994 km of roads were developed and maintained, it includes the Bhopal-Indore Expressway and connectivity of Cities to Bhopal Capital of State.
- National Highways: At an estimated cost of ₹26.96 Billion 731 km of National Highways were developed and maintained.
- Major District Roads: At an estimated cost of ₹55.95 Billion, 3,278 km of Major District Roads were developed and maintained.
- Buildings: It has been agency for development and maintenance of 5 Government Buildings at an estimated cost of ₹1.29 Billion, it includes Madhya Lok Bhavan in Mumbai, Maharashtra.

MPRDC has implemented projects using different models such as BOT, OMT, EPC, etc. Projects has been funded by State Government, Central Government, Asian Development Bank, New Development Bank, etc. .

=== Ongoing Projects ===
There are 184 projects in progress with estimated cost of ₹164.18 Billion covering total road length of 5,149 km.

=== Bhopal-Indore Expressway ===
MPRDC has created first expressway in Madhya Pradesh namely Bhopal-Indore Expressway. Its one of the most important road in Madhya Pradesh and it act as lifeline of Madhya Pradesh. Toll Plazas are also present on the road. Further, technical Evaluation of Consultancy Services for preparation of Detailed Project Report of Access Control 6 Lane Bhopal- Indore Green Field Expressway-157 km and Green Field West-Southern Bhopal Bypass-37 km in the State of Madhya Pradesh is in progress.

=== Narmada Expressway and Chambal Expressway ===
MPRDC has invited consultancy services for the preparation of pre-feasibility report for Narmada Expressway and Chambal Expressway. Narmada Expressway is a proposed eight-lane expressway in the state of Madhya Pradesh. The proposed highway will connect the historic towns of Amarkantak in the eastern end of Madhya Pradesh via Dindori, Shahpura, Jabalpur, Hoshangabad, Barwaha and Alirajpur in the western end of Madhya Pradesh alongside of Narmada River.[1] The highways measures 1,300 km will connected Gujarat with Chhattisgarh. Later, this road will connect Alirajpur to Ahmedabad. Chambal Expressway is a proposed eight-lane expressway in the state of Madhya Pradesh. The proposed highway will connect the historic towns of Sheopur in Madhya Pradesh to Etawah in Uttar Pradesh alongside of Chambal River which will cover Morena, Shampur, Ater and Gohad .[1] The highways measures 185 km will connected Madhya Pradesh with Uttar Pradesh.

== See also ==
- Narmada Expressway
- Chambal Expressway
- Madhya Pradesh
- FASTag
- List of state highways in Madhya Pradesh
