= State Highway 5 (Madhya Pradesh) =

Road in Madhya Pradesh, India

State Highway 5

Route information
- Length: 116 km (72 mi)

Major junctions
- North end: Gaurihar UP border
- Chandla, Bachhon, Rajnagar, Khajuraho, Bameetha
- South end: Ganjdewra

Location
- Country: India
- State: Madhya Pradesh

Highway system
- Roads in India; Expressways; National; State; Asian; State Highways in Madhya Pradesh

Madhya Pradesh State Highway 5 (MP SH 5) is a state highway that runs from Gaurihar town near the MP - UP border to Ganjdewra passing through Chandla, Bachhon, Rajnagar, Khajuraho, and Bameetha.

The highway connects towns in northeastern Madhya Pradesh, with Khajuraho being an important town for tourism.

== See also ==
- List of state highways in Madhya Pradesh
