= State Highway 31 (Madhya Pradesh) =

State highway in Madhya Pradesh, India

State Highway 31

Major junctions
- North end: Nayagaon (Rajasthan Border)
- Neemuch, Mandsaur, Jaora, Ratlam, Badnawar, Dhar, Dhamnod, Kasrawad
- South end: Khargone

Location
- Country: India
- State: Madhya Pradesh

Highway system
- Roads in India; Expressways; National; State; Asian; State Highways in Madhya Pradesh

Madhya Pradesh State Highway 31 (MP SH 31) is a State Highway running from Nayagaon (Madhya Pradesh-Rajasthan Border) till Khargone. It is also known as Mhow-Neemuch road.

It passes through Neemuch, Mandsaur, Jaora, Ratlam, Badnawar, Dhar, Dhamnod, Kasrawad.

Recently, the High Court Bench, Indore had directed the operator, not to collect tolls on SH-31 until it is repaired.

== See also ==
- List of state highways in Madhya Pradesh
