= Hiralal Pippal =

Indian politician

Hiralal Pippal was an Indian politician from the state of the Madhya Pradesh. He represented Vidisha (Vidhan Sabha constituency) of undivided Madhya Pradesh Legislative Assembly by winning the general election of 1957.
