= Thandla Road railway station =

Railway station in Madhya Pradesh

THANDLA ROAD

General information
- Location: Sajeli Damanasath, Madhya Pradesh; India
- Coordinates: 22°57′47″N 74°35′21″E
- Elevation: 319 metres (1,047 ft)
- System: Indian Railways station
- Owner: Indian Railways
- Operator: Western Railway
- Line: New Delhi–Mumbai main line
- Platforms: 3
- Tracks: 3
- Connections: Auto stand

Construction
- Structure type: Standard (on-ground station)
- Parking: No
- Cycle facilities: No

Other information
- Status: Functioning
- Station code: THDR
- Zone(s): Western Railway
- Division(s): Ratlam

Services
Preceding station	Indian Railways	Following station
Meghnagar towards ?	West Central Railway zone New Delhi–Mumbai main line	Bajrangarh towards ?
Location
- Location within India Location within Madhya Pradesh

Thandla Road railway station is a small railway station in Jhabua district, Madhya Pradesh. Its code is THDR. It serves Sajeli Damanasath village and Thandla town. The station consists of three platforms, neither well sheltered. It lacks many facilities including water and sanitation.
