= State Highway 6 (Madhya Pradesh) =

State highway in Madhya Pradesh, India

State Highway 6

Major junctions
- East end: Shivpuri
- Pohari, Karahal
- West end: Goras (Rajasthan Border)

Location
- Country: India
- State: Madhya Pradesh

Highway system
- Roads in India; Expressways; National; State; Asian; State Highways in Madhya Pradesh

Madhya Pradesh State Highway 6 (MP SH 6) is a State Highway running from Shivpuri till Goras town near Madhya Pradesh - Rajasthan border.

A portion of this highway used to extend to Sheopur from Goras also but it has now been notified as a part of National Highway 552.

== See also ==
- List of state highways in Madhya Pradesh
