= State Highway 10 (Madhya Pradesh) =

State highway in Madhya Pradesh, India

State Highway 10

Route information
- Length: 193 km (120 mi)

Major junctions
- North end: Guna
- Aron, Sironj, Berasia
- South end: Bhopal

Location
- Country: India
- State: Madhya Pradesh

Highway system
- Roads in India; Expressways; National; State; Asian; State Highways in Madhya Pradesh

Madhya Pradesh State Highway 10 (MP SH 10) is a State Highway running from Guna city in Guna district via Sironj, Berasia and terminates at Bhopal, the capital town of Madhya Pradesh. It is alternatively known as the Hirapur Bypass, the Aron Bypass, and Berasia Road.

It connects the districts of Guna, Vidisha and Bhopal covering a total distance of 193 kilometers.

In the 2009 renumbering, the road from Guna through Sironj and Bersia to Bhopal was defined as State Highway 23. In 2017, SH 10 was defined.

== See also ==
- List of state highways in Madhya Pradesh
