= Jam Gate =

Jam Gate जाम दरवाजा
- Tourist Attraction
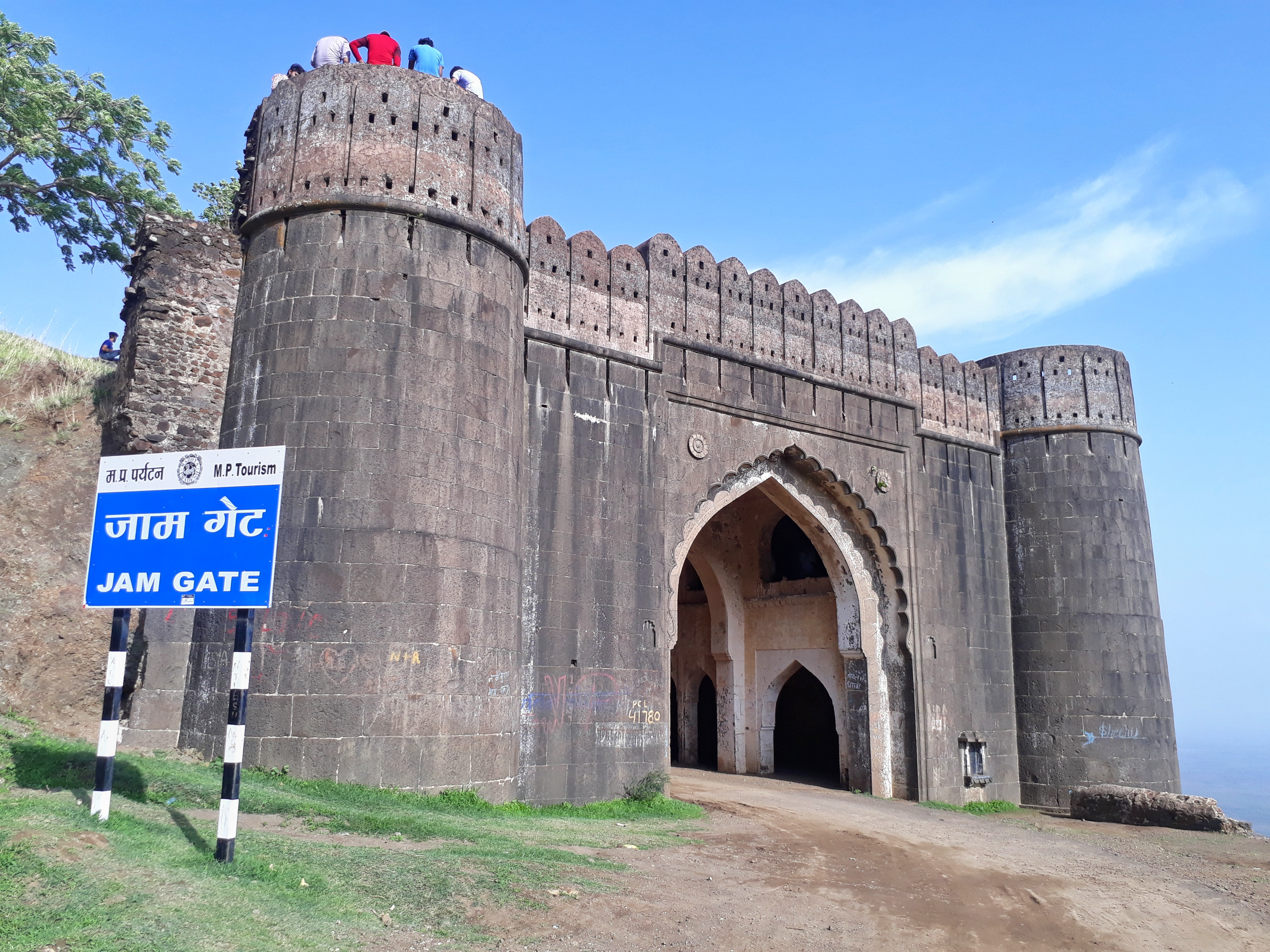
- Jam Gate
- Nickname: Jam Ghat
- Location of Jam Gate in Madhya Pradesh Jam Gate (India)
- Coordinates: 22.3571413°N 75.7355582°E

The Jam Gate is a picnic spot in Maheshwar Tehsil of Khargone District in the state of Madhya Pradesh, India. It is on Mhow-Mandleshwar Road (Now Khargone - Indore state highway no.1). It was built by Rani Ahilyabai Holkar in 1791. It is approximately 30 km from Mhow, 50 km from Indore, 33 km from Maheshwar and 75 km from district headquarter Khargone. Jam gate is the gateway of Malwa - Nimar.

== Best Time to Visit ==
The ambient time to visit is usually during the early mornings, when the whole area is fogged up. One can experience mystical views during the time of sunrise. People can climb atop the gate also after a buying a minimal ticket. Even without it, the view is simply mesmerizing.

== Transport ==
The nearest airport is Indore International Airport which is situated at a distance of roughly 50 KM from the gate. The nearest railway station is Dr. Ambedkar Nagar Railway Station (MHOW) at a distance of about 30KM. The rest of the distance has to be covered via road transport means.

=== Road ===
To reach there, one has to travel on the SH 1 Indore - Khargone State Highway if the starting point is Indore or MHOW and later on, there a slight detour onto the Mhow-Mandleshwar Marg which later joins back into the main SH 1, further down the Jam Gate.
