= Khategaon Assembly constituency =

Constituency of the Madhya Pradesh legislative assembly in India

Coordinates: 22.59°N 76.91°E

Khategaon
- Constituency No. 173 for the Madhya Pradesh Legislative Assembly

Constituency details
- Country: India
- Region: Central India
- State: Madhya Pradesh
- District: Dewas
- Lok Sabha constituency: Vidisha
- Established: 1972
- Reservation: None

Member of Legislative Assembly
- 16th Madhya Pradesh Legislative Assembly
- Incumbent Aashish Govind Sharma
- Party: Bharatiya Janata Party
- Elected year: 2023
- Preceded by: Brijmohan Dhoot

Khategaon is one of the 230 Vidhan Sabha (Legislative Assembly) constituencies of Madhya Pradesh state in central India.

It is part of Dewas district. As of 2023, its representative is Aashish Govind Sharma of the Bharatiya Janata Party.

== Members of the Legislative Assembly ==
=== Madhya Bharat Legislative Assembly ===
Election	Name	Party
1952	Kailash Chandra Giri	Akhil Bharatiya Hindu Mahasabha

=== Madhya Pradesh Legislative Assembly ===
Election	Name	Party
1967	Narmadaprasad Govind Ram Kinkar	Bharatiya Jana Sangh
1972	Manjulabai Vagle	Indian National Congress
1977	Narmadaprasad Govind Ram Kinkar	Janata Party
1980	Narmadaprasad Govind Ram Kinkar	Bharatiya Janata Party
1985	Ganpat Patel	Bharatiya Janata Party
1990	Govind	Bharatiya Janata Party
1993	Kailash Ramchander Kundal	Indian National Congress
1998	Brijmohan Badrinarayan	Bharatiya Janata Party
2003	Brijmohan Dhoot	Bharatiya Janata Party
2008	Brijmohan Dhoot	Bharatiya Janata Party
2013	Aashish Govind Sharma	Bharatiya Janata Party
2018	Aashish Govind Sharma	Bharatiya Janata Party
2023	Aashish Govind Sharma	Bharatiya Janata Party

== Election results ==
=== 2023 ===
2023 Madhya Pradesh Legislative Assembly election: Khategaon
Party	Candidate	Votes	%	±%
BJP	Aashish Govind Sharma	98,629	51.35	+9.58
INC	Deepak Kelash Joshi	86,087	44.82	+7.56
ASP(KR)	Gokul Prasad Hariyale	1,999	1.04	
NOTA	None of the above	1,642	0.85	−0.34
Majority		12,542	6.53	+2.02
Turnout		192,077	81.49	−1.62
BJP hold		Swing		

=== 2018 ===
2018 Madhya Pradesh Legislative Assembly election:
Party	Candidate	Votes	%	±%
BJP	Aashish Govind Sharma	71,984	41.77	
INC	Om Patel	64,212	37.26	
GGP	Mohan Patel Uikey	19,004	11.03	
Independent	Kamal Patel	8,404	4.88	
BSP	Shriniwas Bakliwal	2,474	1.44	
NOTA	None of the above	2,052	1.19	
Majority		7,772	4.51	
Turnout		172,344	83.11	
BJP hold		Swing		

== See also ==
- Dewas district
- List of constituencies of the Madhya Pradesh Legislative Assembly
