= Nishank Kumar Jain =

Indian politician

Abhi MLA

Member of the Madhya Pradesh Legislative Assembly
- In office 2013–2018
- Preceded by: Hari Singh Raghuvanshi
- Succeeded by: Leena Sanjay Jain
- Constituency: Basoda

Personal details
- Born: 5 August 1964 (age 62) Ganj Basoda
- Citizenship: India
- Party: INC, (Indian National Congress)
- Spouse: Nandini Jain
- Education: Barkatullah University (BA, LLB)
- Profession: Politician

Nishank Jain (born 5 August 1964) is an Indian politician and a member of the Indian National Congress party. He is currently Vidisha district president, Indian National Congress.

== Political career ==
He became an MLA in 2013.

He had given Dharna for the compensation to be given to farmers in 2015–16.

== Political views ==
He supports Indian National Congress.

== Personal life ==
He is married to Nandini Jain.

== See also ==
- Madhya Pradesh Legislative Assembly
- 2013 Madhya Pradesh Legislative Assembly election
- 2008 Madhya Pradesh Legislative Assembly election
