= Leena Sanjay Jain =

Indian politician

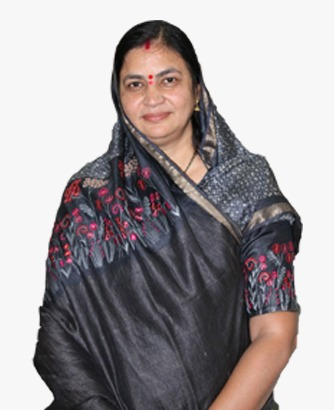

Member of the Madhya Pradesh Legislative Assembly
- In office 2018–2023
- Preceded by: Nishank Kumar Jain
- Succeeded by: Hari Singh Raghuvanshi
- Constituency: Basoda

Personal details
- Born: 22 May 1972 (age 54) Vidisha
- Party: Bharatiya Janta Party
- Spouse: Sanjay Jain "Tappu"
- Children: 2 daughters, 1 son
- Known for: Social work, politics

Leena Sanjay Jain (born 22 May 1972) is former member of the Madhya Pradesh Legislative Assembly for Basoda constituency and a leader of the Bharatiya Janata Party.

== Life introduction ==
Leena Sanjay Jain was born on 22 May 1972. She is married to Sanjay Jain "Tappu".

== Political career ==
She became a member of Bhartiya Janata Party after she got married. She was the first female chairperson/president of Basoda's Municipal Council and is the first female MLA from Basoda Constituency. In the year 2005 she was elected as the chairperson of the Municipal Council of Ganj Basoda from Bhartiya Janata Party. She termed as the chairperson of the Municipal Council from 2005 to 2009. Later she became the district vice president of Mahila Morcha for Bhartiya Janata Party. In 2018 she contested as a candidate for MLA from Basoda Constituency and won the election with a margin of 10,266 votes.

== As an MLA ==
Leena Sanjay Jain became MLA in the year 2018 from Basoda assembly constituency. She is also a member of various committees in the Government of Madhya Pradesh. Previously she was a member of Public Health Engineering Department and Ministry of Women & Child Development of the State Government. Currently she is a member of Food Civil Supplies and Consumer Protection Department in Madhya Pradesh Government.

== Development projects as member of legislative assembly ==
Various major projects which were sanctioned in her tenure include: 1.4 MPEB 33/11 electricity substations were set up in Basoda and Gyaraspur area, a sports stadium was developed in the constituency, a 150-bed fully equipped government hospital, and a 28 km ring road around the constituency.

== See also ==
- Madhya Pradesh Legislative Assembly
- 2018 Madhya Pradesh Legislative Assembly election
