= Kalyan Singh Thakur =

Indian politician

Kalyan Singh Thakur is an Indian politician and member of the Bharatiya Janata Party. Thakur was a member of the Madhya Pradesh Legislative Assembly from the Vidisha South constituency in Vidisha district.
