= State Highway 22 (Madhya Pradesh) =

State highway in Madhya Pradesh, India

State Highway 22

Route information

Major junctions
- West end: Bhoolpur Chowk nearKhategaon
- Nasrullaganj, Hoshangabad, Sohagpur, Pipariya, Gadarwara, Narsinghpur, Jabalpur, Dindori, Bhoolganj.
- East end: Amarkantak (Chhattisgarh Border)

Location
- Country: India
- State: Madhya Pradesh

Highway system
- Roads in India; Expressways; National; State; Asian; State Highways in Madhya Pradesh

Madhya Pradesh State Highway 22 (MP SH 22) is a 600+ Kms(372.9+ mi) long State Highway running from Bhoolpur Chowk near Khategaon till Amarkantak. It is popularly known as Jabalpur Road.

It passes through Hoshangabad, Jabalpur the cultural capital of Madhya Pradesh till the Madhya Pradesh-Chhattisgarh Border via Nasrullaganj, Sohagpur, Pipariya, Gadarwara, Narsinghpur, Gotegaon, Shahpura, Jabalpur, Dindori and Bhoolganj.

== See also ==
- List of state highways in Madhya Pradesh
