= State Highway 2 (Madhya Pradesh) =

State highway in Madhya Pradesh, India

State Highway 2

Major junctions
- East end: Bhind
- Ater, Morena, Joura, Sabalgarh
- West end: Karauli (Rajasthan Border)

Location
- Country: India
- State: Madhya Pradesh

Highway system
- Roads in India; Expressways; National; State; Asian; State Highways in Madhya Pradesh

Madhya Pradesh State Highway 2 (MP SH 2) is a State Highway running from Bhind in Madhya Pradesh till Karauli in Rajasthan via Ater, Morena, Joura and Sabalgarh.

It passes through important tourist spots such as the Fort in Ater in Bhind district.

== See also ==
- List of state highways in Madhya Pradesh
