= State Highway 14 (Madhya Pradesh) =

State highway in Madhya Pradesh, India

State Highway 14

Major junctions
- East end: Katni
- Kumhari, Damoh, Garahkota, Sagar, Jarubakheda, Khurai
- West end: Bina

Location
- Country: India
- State: Madhya Pradesh

Highway system
- Roads in India; Expressways; National; State; Asian; State Highways in Madhya Pradesh

Madhya Pradesh State Highway 14 (MP SH 14) is a State Highway running from Katni city via Kumhari, Damoh, Garahkota, Sagar, Jarubakheda and Khurai till Bina town. It is an important highway which connects important towns of Eastern Madhya Pradesh and Northern Madhya Pradesh.

== See also ==
- List of state highways in Madhya Pradesh
