= State Highway 7 (Madhya Pradesh) =

State highway in Madhya Pradesh, India

State Highway 7

Major junctions
- East end: Morwan
- Neemuch, Manasa, Bhanpur
- West end: Jhalawar (Rajasthan Border)

Location
- Country: India
- State: Madhya Pradesh

Highway system
- Roads in India; Expressways; National; State; Asian; State Highways in Madhya Pradesh

Madhya Pradesh State Highway 7 (MP SH 7) is a State Highway running from Morwan till the Madhya Pradesh - Rajasthan border near Jhalawar.

It connects the towns of Neemuch, Manasa in Madhya Pradesh to Jhalawar city in Rajasthan.

== See also ==
- List of state highways in Madhya Pradesh
