= State Highway 12 (Madhya Pradesh) =

State highway in Madhya Pradesh, India

State Highway 12

Route information
- Length: 155 km (96 mi)

Major junctions
- East end: Jyora
- Midhora, Lidhora, Jatara, KhargeTigala, Palera, Garoli, Nowgaon, Lugasi, Malhera, Lodi
- West end: Chandla

Location
- Country: India
- State: Madhya Pradesh

Highway system
- Roads in India; Expressways; National; State; Asian; State Highways in Madhya Pradesh

Madhya Pradesh State Highway 12 (MP SH 12) is a State Highway running from Jyora via Midhora, Lidhora, Jatara, KhargeTigala, Palera, Garoli, Nowgaon, Lugasi, Malhera, Lodi till Chandla. It is alternatively known as Ludhaura Main Road, Jahara Bypass, Palera Main Road and Garroli Road. It connects the districts of Tikamgarh and Chhatarpur covering a total distance of 155 kilometers.

In 2017, SH 12 was defined.

== See also ==
- List of state highways in Madhya Pradesh
