= Mandleshwar =

Mandleshwar Mandala Mundlesir
- town
- Location in Madhya Pradesh, India Mandleshwar (India)
- Coordinates: 22.18°N 75.67°E
- India: India
- State: Madhya Pradesh
- District: Khargone
- Founder: Mandan Mishra
- Elevation: 153 m (502 ft)

Population (2001)
  - Total: 11,345

Languages-Hindi, Nimari.
  - Official: Hindi
- Time zone: UTC+5:30 (IST)
- Postal code: 451221

Mandleshwar is a town and nagar panchayat in the Khargone district of the India state of Madhya Pradesh. It is on the banks of the Narmada River, 8 kilometres (5.0 mi) east of Maheshwar and 99 kilometres (62 mi) south of Indore. It is a "Pavitra nagri" as termed by the government of Madhya Pradesh, as it is an ancient town. It is the education centre of Maheshwar block, the location of the district court and district jail of Khargone, and also the political centre of Maheshwar block.

== History ==
Mandleshwar is 8 kilometres (5.0 mi) from Maheshwar, the capital of the Holkar states.

The eighth-century philosopher Maṇḍana Miśra reportedly lived in the town and debated with Aadya Guru Shankarachaarya at the Gupteshwar Mahadev Temple.

The British Raj is memorialized in the Sub-Divisional Magistrate, PWD office, the district jail, fort and the 'ghat'. ('Ghat' means a flight of steps leading down to a waterfront). Mandleshwar was the headquarters for the Nimar Agency and cantonment from 1819 to 1864. In 1823, it became the headquarters for the District of Nimar (which, until 1864, was managed by the agent of the governor-general at Indore.

River Narmada is considered by the Hindus to be a holy river and Mandleshwar has tanks, temples and ghats. Hindu temples here include Shree Gupteshwar Mahadev Mandir, Chhappan-Dev, Shree Ram Temple, Shree Datta Temple, Ganga-Zira, and Kaashi Vishweshwar Temple. Dhawal-kunda and Hathani (islands), Sahastradhara, and Ram kund are other places of historical significance. A flight of 123 steps leads down to the river and expands into the Ram Ghat, where the Ram, Hanuman, Dattatraya and Ratneshwar Temples are located. Ghat is located at a narrow point of the Narmada River where, during the monsoon, the river often rises 60 feet (18 m) above its normal level, hence those many steps.

Mandleshwar also has a temple dedicated to Brahmachaitanya Maharaj Gondwalekar.

Vasudevanand Saraswati (a saint) lived in Mandleshwar for a long time.

Swami Vivekananda reportedly lived in the town on his way to Raipur.

== Geography ==
Mandleshwar is located at 22.18°N 75.67°E, and has an average elevation of 153 metres (501 feet).

== Demographics ==
In the 2001 India census, the town had a population of 11,345. Males made up 51 percent of the population, and females 49 percent. Mandleshwar had an average literacy rate of 68 percent, higher than the national average of 59.5 percent; male literacy was 76 percent, and female literacy 59 percent. Fourteen percent of the population was under six years of age.

Religion in Mandleshwar
Religion	Percent
Hindus	77.83%
Muslims	18.15%
Jains	1.89%
Others†	0.03%
Christians	1.15%
Distribution of religions †Includes Sikhs (0.49%), Buddhists (0.01%).

== Culture ==
Festivals celebrated in Mandleshwar include Holi, Diwali, Eid, Christmas, Gurunanak Jayanti, Narmada Jayanti, Gangour Navratri, and Ganesh Chaturthi. Gangaur is the most popular.

== Access ==
Mandleshwar can be reached by road from Dhamnod, Barwaha, and Khargone.

== Transport ==
The nearest airport is Indore.
