= State Highway 11 (Madhya Pradesh) =

State highway in Madhya Pradesh, India

State Highway 11

Major junctions
- North end: Chitrakoot (UP border)
- Majhgawa, Kothi, Satna, Uchehara, Maihar, Bhadanpur, Badera, Barhi, Khitoli, Parasi, Umaria, Shahpura, Kathotya
- South end: Chabi

Location
- Country: India
- State: Madhya Pradesh

Highway system
- Roads in India; Expressways; National; State; Asian; State Highways in Madhya Pradesh

Madhya Pradesh State Highway 11 (MP SH 11) is a State Highway running from Chitrakoot town near (UP border) via Majhgawa, Kothi, Satna, Uchehara, Maihar, Bhadanpur, Badera, Barhi, Khitoli, Parasi, Umaria, Shahpura, Kathotya till Chabi town in Mandla district.

It is an important highway which connects important towns of Eastern Madhya Pradesh.

== See also ==
- List of state highways in Madhya Pradesh
