= Aashish Govind Sharma =

Indian politician

Member of the Madhya Pradesh Legislative Assembly
- Incumbent
- Assumed office 2013
- Preceded by: Brijmohan Dhoot
- Constituency: Khategaon

Personal details
- Political party: Bharatiya Janata Party
- Profession: Politician

Aashish Govind Sharma is an Indian politician from Madhya Pradesh. He is a three time elected member of the Madhya Pradesh Legislative Assembly from 2013, 2018, and 2023, representing Vidisha Assembly constituency as a Member of the Bharatiya Janata Party.

== See also ==
- List of chief ministers of Madhya Pradesh
- Madhya Pradesh Legislative Assembly
