= Ramakant Bhargava =

Politician from Madhya Pradesh, India

Member of the Madhya Pradesh Legislative Assembly
- Incumbent
- Assumed office 23 November 2024
- Preceded by: Shivraj Singh Chouhan
- Constituency: Budhni

Member of Parliament, Lok Sabha
- In office 23 May 2019 – 4 June 2024
- Preceded by: Sushma Swaraj
- Succeeded by: Shivraj Singh Chouhan
- Constituency: Vidisha

Personal details
- Born: 2 October 1953 (age 72) Jait, Bhopal State, India
- Citizenship: Indian
- Party: Bharatiya Janata Party
- Spouse: Santosh Bhargava
- Children: 2
- Education: Higher Secondary School, Shahganj, Madhya Pradesh
- Profession: Politician

Ramakant Bhargava (born 2 October 1953; Hindi pronunciation: [ɾəmaːkaːn̪t̪ bʱaːɾgəʋ]) is an Indian politician. He was elected to the Lok Sabha, lower house of the Parliament of India from Vidisha, Madhya Pradesh in the 2019 Indian general election as member of the Bharatiya Janata Party. and he is former Chairman Markfed Madhya Pradesh and former Director Apex Bank, Madhya Pradesh.

He was elected as MLA in 2024 By poll held for Budhni constituency.
