= Mukesh Tandan =

Indian politician

Member of Madhya Pradesh Legislative Assembly
- Incumbent
- Assumed office 2023
- Preceded by: Shashank Bhargava
- Constituency: Vidisha

Personal details
- Political party: Bharatiya Janata Party
- Profession: Politician

Mukesh Tandan is an Indian politician from Madhya Pradesh. He is a Member of the Madhya Pradesh Legislative Assembly from 2023, representing Vidisha Assembly constituency as a Member of the Bharatiya Janata Party.

== See also ==
- List of chief ministers of Madhya Pradesh
- Madhya Pradesh Legislative Assembly
