= Khalghat =

- town
- Location in Madhya Pradesh, India
- Coordinates: 22.15734°N 75.446055°E
- Country: India
- State: Madhya Pradesh
- District: Dhar
- Elevation: 150 m (490 ft)

Languages
  - Official: Hindi
- Time zone: UTC+5:30 (IST)
- ISO 3166 code: IN-MP
- Vehicle registration: MP

Khalghat (22°09'26.2"N 75°27'09.7"E) is a small town and a gram panchayat in Dhar district in the state of Madhya Pradesh, India. It is located on the north bank of the Narmada, at an important ford where the Agra-Bombay national highway crosses the river. Hindi and Nimadi and language are the primary languages spokenin the area.

== History ==
In ancient times Khalghat was known as Khalighaṭṭa and lay on long-distance routes connecting Malwa to the Deccan. Here on the banks of the Revā i.e. Narmada, Caccha, a feudatory of Paramāra king Sīyaka II (c. 949–972) gave battle to Khoṭṭigadeva, the Rāṣṭrakūṭa king of Māṇyakheṭa, around 972-973 CE, and died a heroic death. This is recorded in verse 29 of the Panaheda temple inscription of Maṇḍalīka, king of a Paramāra branch ruling from Vāgaḍa in Banswara district of Rajasthan.

Under the Mughal Empire, the main crossing was 1.5 km further east on the south bank of the Narmada, known as Akbarpur (22°08'58.6"N 75°28'13.7"E). In the 16th and 17th century, this river-crossing lay on a route frequented by several foreign travellers to the Mughal court, from the Catalán Jesuit António de Monserrate in 1580 to the merchant William Finch (d. 1613) and captain John Jourdain (d. 1619) of the East India Company: Burhanpur—Asirgarh—Bhikangaon—Akbarpur—Mandu—Depalpur—Ujjain—Barrai—Sironj. This route seems to have suffered under Emperor Shah Jahan, when Handiya became the major conduit for military traffic to Deccan. But with the establishment of Maratha rule, the Khalghat/Akbarpur ford was revived in order to serve the towns of western Malwa, especially the new capital at Indore. The British main road from Bombay to Agra, which developed between 1840 and 1860, crossed Khalghat over a collapsible trestlework bridge, continuing through Indore, Sarangpur and Shivpuri to Gwalior.

== Geography ==
Dhar is located at 21.10°N 75.27°E. It has an average elevation of 150 metres (495 feet).

It is located on the banks of Narmada River and National Highway 3 Agra-Indore-Dhule-Mumbai.

== Places of archaeological interest ==
The town is rich in unexplored archaeological sites, which include Panch-paoli, Nāwada-ki-mātā, and the ruins of a terrace. Excavations were conducted at Khalghat in 1998-1999 under G.K. Chandrol and P. Mathur of the Directorate of Archaeology, Archives & Museums, Madhya Pradesh.
