= Hari Singh Raghuwanshi =

Indian politician

Member of Madhya Pradesh Legislative Assembly
- In office 2003–2013
- Constituency: Basoda
- Incumbent
- Assumed office 2023
- Constituency: Basoda

Personal details
- Party: Bharatiya Janata Party
- Profession: Politician

Hari Singh Raghuwanshi is an Indian politician from Madhya Pradesh. He is a three time Member of the Madhya Pradesh Legislative Assembly from 2003, 2008 and 2023, representing Basoda Assembly constituency as a Member of the Bharatiya Janata Party.

== See also ==
- List of chief ministers of Madhya Pradesh
- Madhya Pradesh Legislative Assembly
