= Shahganj, Madhya Pradesh =

Town in Madhya Pradesh, India

Shahganj
- Town
- Location in India
- Coordinates: 22.84°N 77.79°E
- Country: India
- State: Madhya Pradesh
- District: Sehore District

Shahganj is a town and nagar parishad in Sehore district of Madhya Pradesh. It belongs to Budhni Tehsil.

== Geography ==
Shahganj is located at 22.84°N 77.79°E. It has an average elevation of 269 metres (885 feet). It is located near Narmada River.

== Demographics ==
The Shahganj Town had a population of 8510, of whom 4359 were males while 4151 are females, as of Census 2011.

== Notable places ==
- Ratapani Wildlife Sanctuary
- Amargarh Waterfall

== Notable people ==
- Ramakant Bhargav, MP of Vidisha

== Transportation ==
Shahganj is well connected with Bhopal and Hoshangabad. Daily buses run from here.
