= Manawar =

- Town
- Location in Madhya Pradesh, India Manawar (India)
- Coordinates: 22.23°N 75.08°E
- Country: India
- State: Madhya Pradesh
- District: Dhar

Government
  - Type: Parliamentary republic
  - Body: Congress
- Elevation: 180 m (590 ft)

Population (2011 population as of 2019 is about 79000)
  - Total: 30,393

Languages
  - Official: Hindi And Nimadi
- Time zone: UTC+5:30 (IST)
- PIN: 454446
- ISO 3166 code: IN-MP
- Vehicle registration: MP 11

Manawar is a town with tehsil in Dhar district in the Indian state of Madhya Pradesh. The name Manawar came from name of river Maan River that flows at southern edge of the town. Pin code of Manawar is 454446.

== Geography ==
Manawar is located at 22.23°N 75.08°E. It has an average elevation of 180 metres (590 feet). It lies in Narmada Valley.

Nearest Railway station and airport is Indore which is 129 km from Manawar. National Highway 3 is 50 km from Manawar.

== Demographics ==
As of the 2011 Census of India, Manawar had a population of 30,393. Males constitute 51% of the population and females 49%. Manawar has an average literacy rate of 63%, lower than the national average of 74.04%: male literacy is 68%, and female literacy is 58.7%. In Manawar, 13.5% of the population is under 6 years of age.

== Places ==
Some of the religious places in Manawar are Rajendra Suri Jain Dadawadi, Gayatri Mandir, Shri Jageshwar Mandir, Shri Banknath Mahadev Mandir, Shri Mangla Devi Mandir, Shri Parshvanath Jain Mandir, Shri Manta Ganesh Mandir and Shri Balipurwale Baba Mandir.

The Ashram of famous saint Shri Balipurwale Babaji, is located in Balipur, Tehsil-Manawar.

== Economy ==
Manawar is known as the "Business City" of Dhar district due to its trading activities.

Manawar area is mainly connected with agricultural based economy, mainly wheat, gram, maize, cottonseed and pulse crops are grown here. Minerals are also found in abundance here, limestone mining and cement factories operate here.

The main businesses in town are Jewelry, Cloth, steel utensils, Cotton Mills, Cement factories, Tile factories, Torch accumulator and torch factories, cement pipes, stone crushing, electric poles and a cement barricade factory.

== Business and lifestyle ==
Surrounded by around 60 villages, business is mainly dependent on agriculture. Crops grown in the area include soybean, cotton, wheat and red chilli. It is known as the "Business City" of Dhar district. Festivals like Diwali, Dussehra, Raksha Bandhan, Eid, Holi, Guru Saptami are celebrated in the area. Man Dam Garden is used as a local picnic spot.
