= Dongargaon, Agar Malwa =

Village in Madhya Pradesh, India

- Town
- Location within Madhya Pradesh Location within India
- Coordinates: 24.2480895°N 76.1641574°E
- Country: India
- State: Madhya Pradesh
- District: Agar Malwa
- Tehsil: Susner
- Gram Panchayat: Present Sarpanch is Gyankunwar Prem Singh Songara

Languages
  - Official: Hindi
- Time zone: UTC+5:30 (IST)
- PIN: 465449
- Telephone code: 07361
- Vehicle registration: MP 70
- Sex ratio: 1000/944 ♂/♀

Dongargaon, Agar Malwa is a town and a gram panchayat in the Agar Malwa district of Madhya Pradesh. It is located on the Indore–Kota National Highway on the bank of Kali Sindh River.

== Demographics ==
The 2001 Census of India recorded Dongargaon having 1,424 families. The 2011 Census of India showed a total population of 7,159 people (3,645 male, 3,514 female). Dongargaon's population of children between ages 0–6 was 913, composing 12.75% of the village's total population.

Of these inhabitants, 4323 were deemed literate, 2836 illiterate. The village's literacy rate of 69.21% is close to the average of 69.32% in Madhya Pradesh. Male literacy stood at 83.45% while the female rate was 54.58%.

As per the constitution of India and Panchyati Raj, Dongargaon is administrated by a sarpanch, who is the elected representative of village.

Schedule Castes constitute 24.89% of the population, while Schedule Tribes were 10.39% of the inhabitants.

In Dongargaon village, 3612 people were engaged in work activities. 60.55% of workers describe their work as Main Work (Employment or Earning more than 6 Months) while 39.45% were involved in marginal activity providing livelihood for less than 6 months. Of 3,612 workers engaged in main work, 756 were cultivators (owner or co-owner) while 830 were agricultural labourers.

== Religion ==
The town is predominantly Hindu; the 2011 Census of India reported 96% of inhabitants were Hindu and 4% Muslims.
