= Khetia =

Khetia Khetiya
- Town
- Location in Madhya Pradesh, India Khetia (India)
- Coordinates: 21°40′24″N 74°35′13″E
- Country: India
- State: Madhya Pradesh
- District: Barwani

Government
  - Type: Municipal-Council
  - Body: Nagar Panchayat Parishad
  - Chairperson: Shri Dashrath Nikum (BJP)

Population (2012)
  - Total: 60,007

Languages
  - Official: Hindi • Ahirani
- Time zone: UTC+5:30 (IST)
- Postal code: 451881
- Telephone code: 91-7286
- ISO 3166 code: IN-MP
- Vehicle registration: MP 46

Khetia is a town and a nagar panchayat (municipal council) in the Barwani district in the Indian central western state of Madhya Pradesh. The town shares its border with the state of Maharashtra and connectivity for the state of Gujarat.

== Demographics ==
In the 1990 census of India, Khetia had a population of 14,265. Males constituted 52% and females 48%. Khetia had an average literacy rate of 66%, higher than the national average of 59.5%: male literacy was 75% and female literacy was 58%. 15% of the population was below age six.

As of the 2011 Census of India the population was 15,744, with 8,148 (51.7%) male and 7.596 (48.2%) female; the average literacy rate was 70.1%, with male literacy at 75.6% and female literacy at 64.3%. 12.9% of the population was below age six.

== Education ==
There are public and private schools in town with Govt. schools as well.

● Govt. Boys HHS School
● Govt. Girls HHS School
● Guruvar Ravindra Nath Taigor School
● Saraswati Shishu Mandir
● Gurukul Public English Medium School
● St. A.Mary English Medium School,
Rajwardhan Pawar Alumnus
