= Semaria =

- village
- Location Madhya Pradesh Rewa, India
- Coordinates: 24°47′42″N 81°9′8″E
- Country: India
- State: Madhya Pradesh
- District: Rewa

Population (2001)
  - Total: 12,325

Languages
  - Official: Hindi
- Time zone: UTC+5:30 (IST)
- Website: www.semariyamunicipal.com

Semaria is a town and a nagar panchayat and Legislative Assembly Area in Rewa district in the Indian state of Madhya Pradesh.

== Demographics ==
As of 2001 India census, Semariya had a population of 12,325. Males constitute 54% of the population and females 46%. Semariya has an average literacy rate of 60%, higher than the national average of 59.5%: male literacy is 69%, and female literacy is 49%. In Semariya, 17% of the population is under six years of age.

Semariya has been made Legislative Assembly Area now, there would be a separate MLA for Semariya. Currently it comes under Sirmaur while Block Development Office is still in Sirmaur. Its PIN code is 486445.

Semariya is surrounded by a range of pilgrimage centres like Dharkundi (monks shelter), 15 km, Birshinghpur (ancient Gavinath Shivalinga), 21 km, Chitrakut, 90 km. Basaman Mama (Yaksha God), 11 km, is also a worship place for locals which is situated in bank of the Tons river.

Semariya is the only large market for more than 200 villages in its Division. A shopping complex has also been made by Laxman Bag trust, Semariya. It has one government college and one government aided YPSPG college for Arts, Science and Commerce faculties and two government higher secondary schools (each for boys and girls), however there are half dozen Private Schools like Sarashwati Shishu Mandir, Gyan Jyoti English School, Gulab Shishu Mandir.

KP Tripathi of Bharatiya Janata Party (BJP) is current MLA of Semariya constituency. Ajay Shukla, ShyamKali Gupta, Sitaram Kashyap, Rajaram Gupta are the former chairman Nagar parishad and social activist hails from this area.

== Transport ==
By air

Nearest airport in Prayagraj, Uttar Pradesh.

By bus Bus stand available in the city bus stand Semaria.
