= Kukshi =

Kukshi Kooksee
- Town
- Location in Madhya Pradesh, India
- Coordinates: 22.2°N 74.75°E
- Country: India
- State: Madhya Pradesh
- District: Dhar

Government
  - Type: Democratic
  - Body: Municipality
- Elevation: 170 m (560 ft)

Population (2011)
  - Total: 37,482

Languages
  - Official: Hindi
- Time zone: UTC+5:30 (IST)
- Postal code: 454331

Kukshi is a town in Dhar district of Madhya Pradesh state, India. Kukshi has population of around 37,482 making it a Tier-3 city and a Semi-Urban centre. It is a Nagar Parishad. Kukshi is famous for the business of cotton, chilli, gold and silver, and ready made garments.

== Geography ==
Kukshi is a part of the Nimar (Nemar) region of Madhya Pradesh. It is 350 km from Bhopal and 170 km from Indore. It lies west of the Narmada River valley and south of the Vindhyas. Kukshi is the biggest tehsil of the Dhar district. It is surrounded by the districts of Dhar to the north, Khargone (West Nimar) to the northeast, Barwani to the southeast, and Alirajpur and Jhabua to the west.

== Climate ==
Kukshi has a subtropical climate, which is made up of a hot, dry summer (April–June) followed by monsoon season (July–September), and a cool, dry winter. The average rainfall is about 45 inches per year. The temperature varies from around 10 °C in the winter to 45 °C in the summer.

== Demographics ==
{{bar

Religions in Kukshi
Religion	Percent हिन्दू 90%
Hindus	88.0%
Muslims	11.0%
Jains	2.0%
Others†	1.0%
Distribution of religion

As of 2011 India census, Kukshi had a population of 37,482. Males constitute 51% of the population and females 49%. Kukshi has an average literacy rate of 79.9%, higher than the national average of 59.5%: male literacy is 86.9%, and female literacy is 72.8%. In Kukshi, 15% of the population is under 6 years of age.

Being nearest to the Maharashtra (~100 km), Gujarat (~ 60 km) and Rajasthan (~150 km) borders there are also inhabitants from these states, too. Most of the population is dependent upon farming and trading.

== Economy ==
Kukshi is one of the major towns in Dhar district and serves as a local commercial centre. The primary source of income is Agriculture. It falls in the Maharashtra cotton belt providing very good business opportunities. Cotton produced in Kukshi tehsil and its villages are of international quality, having long, fine threads. Kukshi also provides a trading opportunity to Bhils who live in the surrounding areas to come for their shopping needs. The main businesses in town are Jewelry, Cloth, steel utensils, Cotton Mills, Cement factories, Tile factories, Torch accumulator and torch factories, cement pipes, stone crushing, electric poles and a cement barricade factory.

Kukshi has numerous educational institutes such as Sardar Patel college, Pushpam Academy School Kukshi, Allegiance Academy, Child welfare School, Datahari Public School, Unique Academy, Kanya Parisar.

== Culture ==
The residents of Kukshi belong to a variety of religions. Religious places are located in almost every part of city. Some of the famous and most-visited temples & mosques are Gayatri Mandir, Swaminarayan Mandir, Shani Mandir, Echhappurna Hanuman Mandir, Ganesh Mandir, Shiv Mandir, Ranchhod Rai (Khakchok) Mandir, Ram Mandir, Aai Mata Mandir, Satyanarayan Mandir, Ambika mandir etc.

Of these, Sarkari Mandir temple is presumed to be a very old temple and Datahari Mandir also. Its name, data+hari, indicates that this temple was built to show unity among peoples of two important religious groups then: Hindus and Muslims. Gayatri Mandir is considered as a very pleasant location in city as the temple is on an island in a pond accessed by a bridge.

There are Eight mosques in Kukshi. Hakimi Masjid (Dawoodi Bohra), Markaz e Ahle Sunnat Jama Masjid, Badpura is a central entity for all of them. Hafiz Muhammed Ashfaque Ashrafi (Badey Hafiz Sahab) is the head preacher of that mosque. Ghause Aazam ka aastana (Mazaar) and Baaley Shah data ka aastana are most significant among all of the other spiritual Islamic places in town.

== Neighborhoods ==
The neighborhoods (Mohallas) were considered as a block for a particular community in early days.

== Places of interest ==
The nearby attractions of Kukshi are:

1. Bagh Caves
2. Talanpur tirth - Sri Parshvanath Rajendra Jain Swetamber Pedhi and Sri Talanpur Digamber Mandir Pedhi at Talanpur are located 4km west of Kukshi town
3. Bawangaja
4. Koteshwar
5. Shahid Chandra Shekhar Azad Sagar(Faata dam)
6. (Badkeshwar)
7. खाकचौक (स्वर्णकार समाज) रणछोड़रॉय मंदिर
