= Budhni =

Budhni Budni
- Town
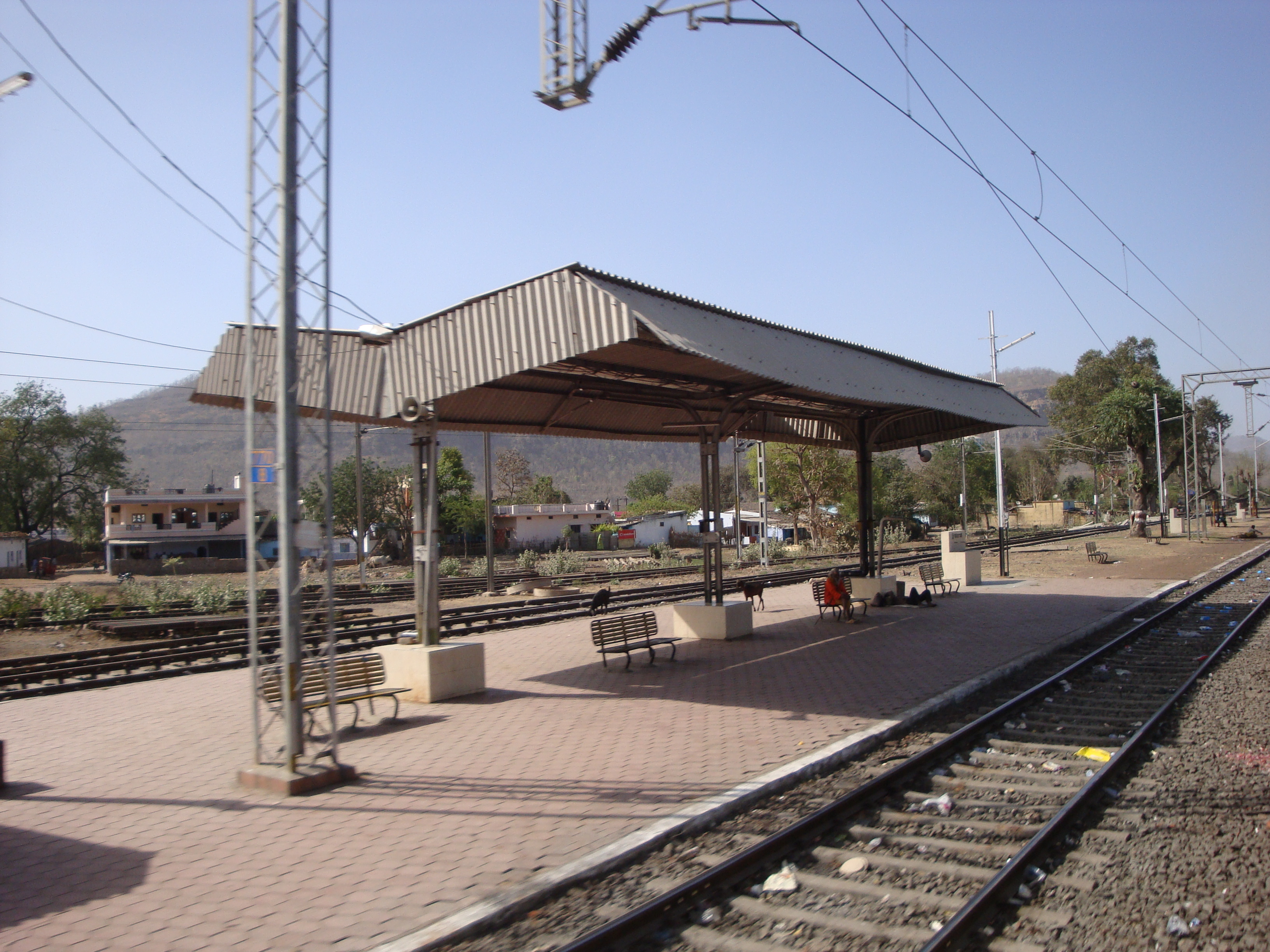
- Budni Railway Station

- Location in Madhya Pradesh, India Budhni (India)
- Coordinates: 22.81°N 77.62°E
- Country: India
- State: Madhya Pradesh
- District: Sehore

Government
  - MLA: Ramakant Bhargava (BJP)
- Elevation: 311 m (1,020 ft)

Population (2011)
  - Total: 16,808

Languages
  - Official: Hindi
- Time zone: UTC+5:30 (IST)
- Pincode: 466445
- STD code: 07564
- Vehicle registration: MP-37

Budhni, also spelled Budni or Budhani, is a town and a Nagar Palika in Sehore district in the state of Madhya Pradesh, India. It is situated on Bhopal to Narmadapuram road at a distance of 7 km from Narmadapuram in north direction on the banks of Narmada River.It is also famous for Tractor testing i.e. CFMTTI (Institute under central government or Tractor Nagar.

== History ==
Budhni is near the sacred siddhpeeth of Vindhyavasni Beejasan devi (one of the incarnation of the Hindu goddess Durga) at Salkanpur atop a hill 800 foot high. Thousands of people visit this place everyday climbing more than 1000 steps. Every year a grand fair is held in Salkanpur during Navratri. It is very old Temple but at present temple renovate by Salkanpur Trust. It is on an 800 foot high hillrock, in the village Salkanpur near Rehti village, 70 km from Bhopal.

Budhni Ghat is a place for swimming and other activities. Of late the town has become famous for an electoral battle for Bharatiya Janata Party (BJP) Chief Minister Shivraj Singh Chouhan and others.

== Demographics ==
As of the 2011 Census of India, Budhni had a population of 16,808. Males constitute 55% of the population and females 45%. Budhni has an average literacy rate of 71%, higher than the nation's average of 59.5%; with male literacy of 78% and female literacy of 63%. 14% of the population is under 6 years of age.

== Industry ==
Budhni has become an important Textile industry center with the establishment of Vardhman Industries and TridentGroup. The Central Farm Machinery Training & Testing Institute is located in Budni. Budhni has become one of the few small towns that have a BPO/Call center. The Rural BPO has been set up by RuralShores Business Services. Local youth are getting trained by RuralShores Skills Academy and provided a job in RuralShores Center in Budhni itself.

== Transport ==
The Budhni railway station falls on the Bhopal-Itarsi route. Some passenger trains, including the Dadar-Amritsar Express halt here. The town is also served by NH-69. Nearest airport Bhopal.

== See also ==
- Shahganj
- Baktara
