= Barwaha =

Barwaha Barwaai
- City
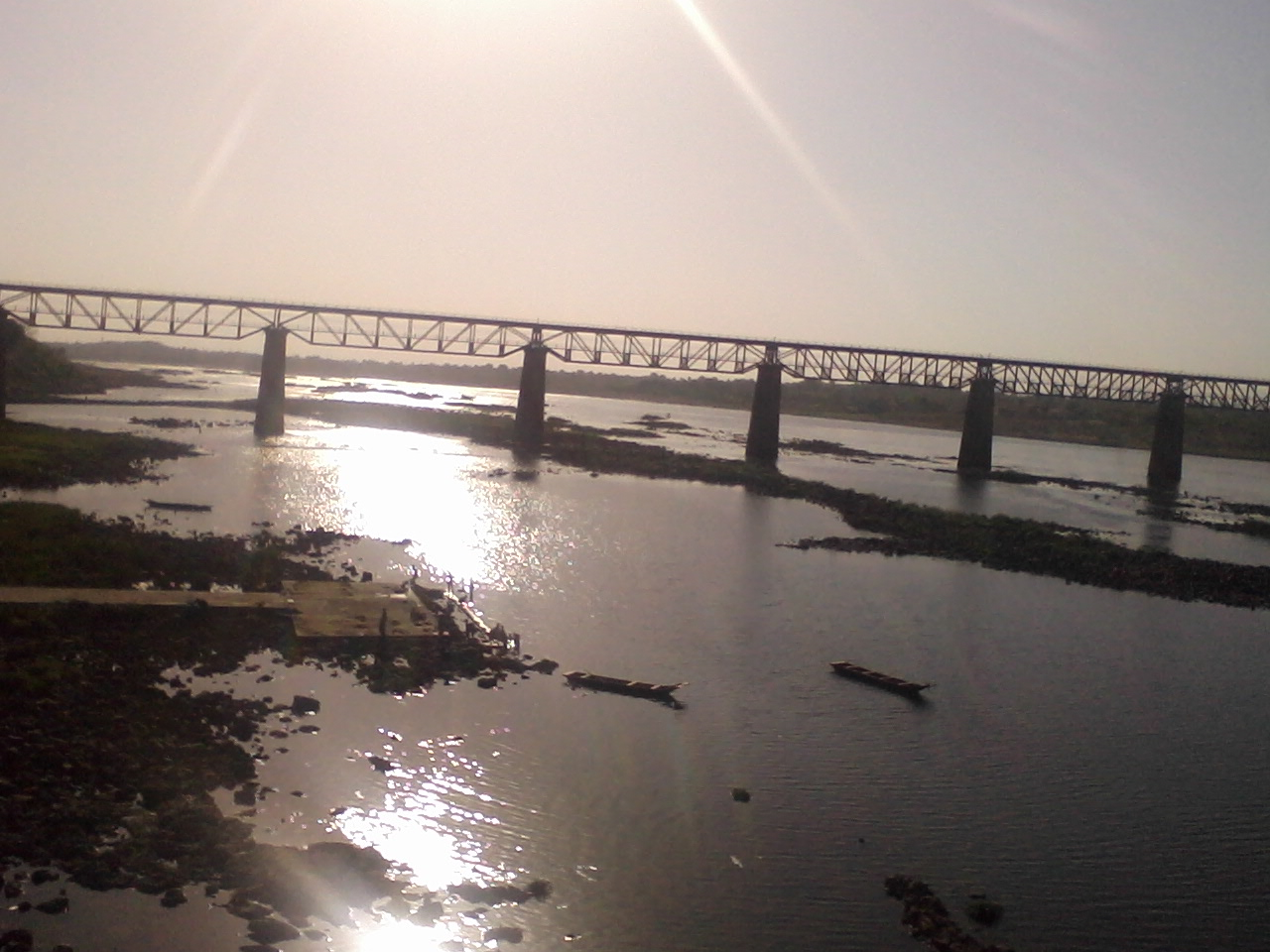
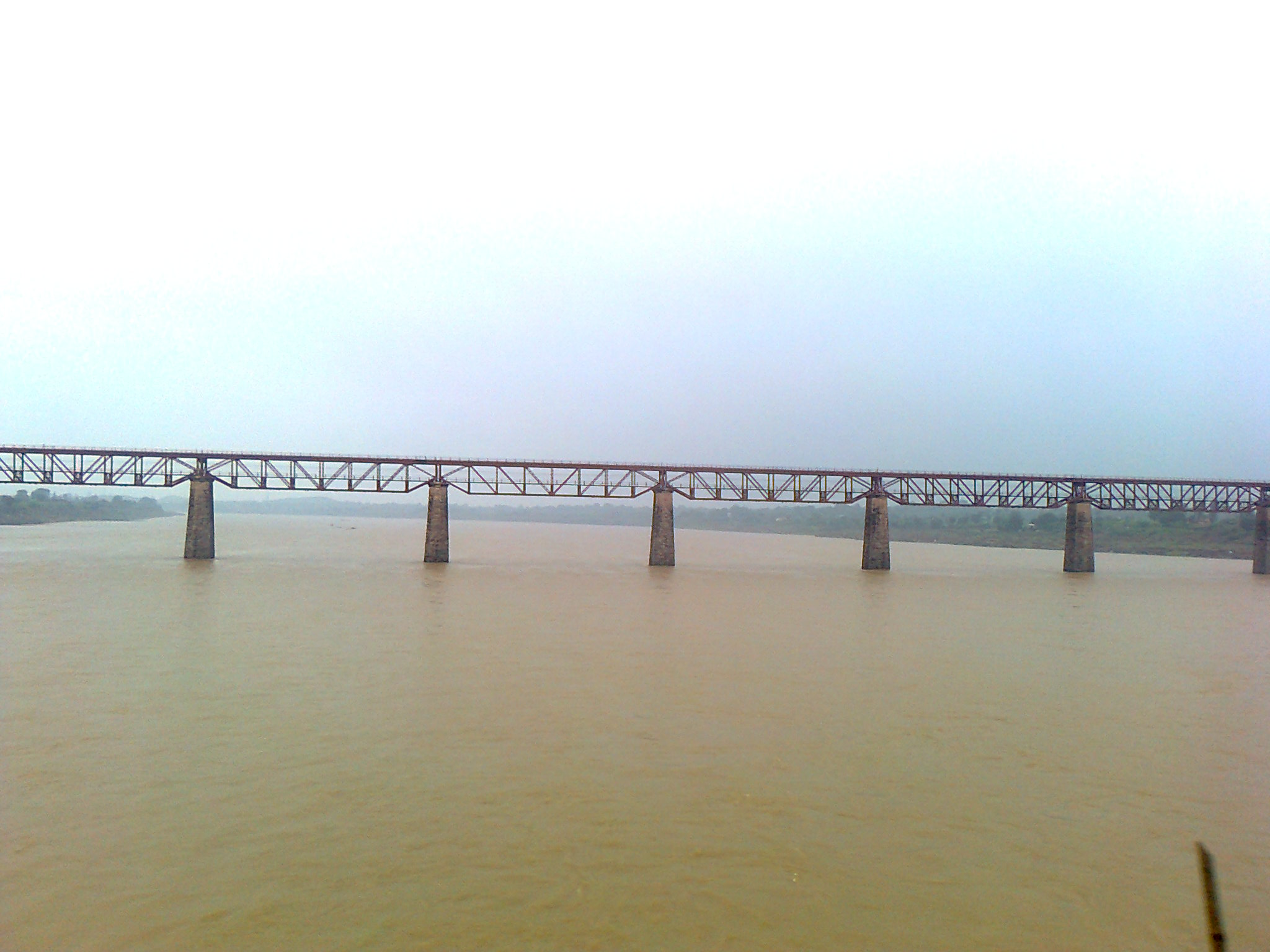
- Narmada Bridge

- Location in Madhya Pradesh, India
- Country: India
- Region: Nimar
- District: Khargone District
- Ward (electoral subdivision): 28 Wards

Government
  - Type: Municipal Board

Population (2011)
  - Total: 61,973

Languages
  - Official: Hindi, English, Nimadi
- Time zone: UTC+5:30 (IST)
- Postal code: 451115
- Telephone code: 07280
- Vehicle registration: MP 10

Barwaha is a municipality and sub district in Khargone district in the state of Madhya Pradesh, India situated on the banks of Narmada river. Barwaha is the second biggest city of District after Khargone city. The Barwaha city is divided into 28 wards for which elections are held every 5 years. The Barwaha Municipality has an estimated population of 61,973 of which 32,940 are males while 29,033 are females as per report released by Census India 2011. Literacy rate of Barwaha is 87.27% higher than state average of 69.32%. The male and female literacy rate is around 92.73% and 81.23%.

Barwaha Municipality has total administration over 10,133 houses to which it supplies basic amenities like water and sewerage. It is also authorized to build roads within Municipality limits and impose taxes on properties coming under its jurisdiction. The city is situated on the banks of the Narmada River. It has longest palace of Asia "Dariya Mahal" and largest CISF training campus in India. The city is surrounded by hundreds of very small villages and so is the main market area for those villages.

Barwaha is connected to Maharashtra, Rajasthan and Gujarat through various state highways and rail route. Omkareshwar Jyotirlinga is just 15 km from here.

Barwaha is known for cotton production and cotton ginning factories as well as Lime of Barwah and Chivda of Barwaha. It is also an important industrial city with several calcium, ginning, agro, bag, textile industries.

== Barwaha District (Proposed) ==
Since Barwaha holds the facts and figures that a district should have, locals are demanding a new "BARWAHA DISTRICT" from past 40 years.

Proposed Barwaha District

== History ==
Barwaha is a municipality in the District of Khargone is situated in the state of Madhya Pradesh in the central region of India. Khargone was formerly known as West Nimar. A part of the Indore Division lying on the region of Nimar, The District headquarters is located in the city of Khargone along with other functional offices i.e., police station, the collectorate office, telecom and other governmental organizations.

In ancient times, the Haihayas of Mahishmati (present-day Maheshwar) ruled this region. In early medieval age, the area was under the Gurjaras of Bharuch, Paramaras of Malwa and the Ahirs of Asirgarh. In late medieval age, the area was under Malwa Sultanate of Mandu. In 1531, Gujarat sultan Bahadur Shah brought this area under his control. In 1562, Akbar annexed this territory along with the whole Malwa to Mughal Empire. In 1740 Marathas under the Peshwa brought the area under their control. In 1778, Peshwa distributed this territory to the Maratha rulers, Holkars of Indore, Sindhias of Gwalior and Ponwars of Dhar. At the time of Maratha rulers Barwaha comes under Holkar reign. Barwaha is considered to be the holiday place by the Maharajah of Indore in pre-independent British India.

During the reign of Mughal emperor Shah Jahan, Rana Durjansal of Tanwar dynasty received the Zamindari of Jaitpuri (Barwaha) in 1646. In the year 1758, Shivaji Rao Holkar of Holkar dynasty built the longest palace of Asia the Dariya Mahal at Barwaha which is now an administration building of CISF RTC Barwaha.

After the independence and merger of the princely states with Union of India in 1948, this territory became West Nimar district of Madhya Bharat. On 1 November 1956, the district became part of the newly formed state of Madhya Pradesh. On 25 May 1998, West Nimar district was bifurcated into two districts: Khargone and Barwani and Barwaha comes under Khargone district.

Barwaha is known for its ghats and is built on the banks of Narmada River, Choral River and river Padali surrounded by Ujjain, Indore and Dewas as its northern frontier, the state of Maharashtra Khandwa and Burhanpur as the southern side and Khargone and Barwani as the Western border. The people of Barwaha speak Nimadi. It is the primary language in west Nimar, Bareli and Palya, the language of Bhil is spoken in the central territory of Madhya Pradesh; Bareli Rathwi, Bhil is written in Bhilali and Devanagari script.

The city was an important industrial city during the British Raj but now it is losing the dignity due to biasedness of politicians and officials towards other towns (Sanawad and Maheshwar).

== Geography ==
Barwaha is located in the south-west border of Madhya Pradesh 283 metres (928 ft) above sea level. The city is connected to the cities of Indore, Khandwa, Dewas, Ujjain, Burhanpur, Dhar, Hoshangabad, Khargone, Barwani, Mhow, Maheshwar, Dhamnod, Omkareshwar, Alirajpur, Manawar by road. The town has a meter-gauge railway line connecting Barwaha-Mhow. The nearest airport is Devi Ahilya Bai Holkar Airport. The nearest main railway station is located at Indore and Khandwa.

== Transport ==
Air

The closest airport is Devi Ahilya Bai Holkar Airport (60 km).

Rail

Barwaha railway station is situated on Mhow – Omkareshwar Road Passenger line, which is the largest remaining meter gauge line in India. Recently gauge conversion started on this line. After conversion it will connect Indore to south India.

Road

Barwaha is connected with other parts of the state. It is connected by road with Indore, Ujjain, Khandwa, Burhanpur, Barwani, Dhamnod, Omkareshwar, Khargone, Khategaon, Bhopal . It is situated at the junction of SH-38 and SH-27.

== Barwaha – Bodeli (Narmada Valley ) Railway Line ==
Barwaha is an important industrial as well as religious and economical city hence in 1906, a survey was done to connect Barwaha and Bodeli, Gujarat. Construction of Bodeli to Chota Chhota Udaipur was completed but unfortunately Chhota Udaipur to Barwaha was not constructed.

Click this link to read about that important but unfortunate railway.

Following are some important phrases from the letters written for this line:

- P. H. Maflin, O. B. E., M. C., Railway Departmcnt, ( Railway Board ), was appointed to carry out • the investigation, already stated was to comprehend the area bounded by the railways connecting Surat, Godhra, Ratlam, Indore, Barwaha, Khandwa and Bhusaval) and to make recommendations for the development of this area by feeder railways.
- He also invited the views of the Baroda Government on the

(1) Chhota Udepur—Kuksi—Barwaha via Alirajpur and

( 2 ) Piplod—Devgadh Baria—Alirajpur—Kuksi – Barwaha projects

- With the construction of the railway, Mr. Maflinthinks, a new orientation will be given to the imports and exports, the distance from Barwaha to Bombay being:

via Khandwa 394 miles,

via Ratlam and Baroda 528 miles, and

via the proposed chord 434 miles.

- If no decision be arrived at early on the alignment of the proposed Chhota Udaipur Barwaha section Chord, Mr. Maflin suggests that a traffic survey be commenced as early as possible of the section from Barwaha to Kuksi with a branch to Chikalda. This section would traverse the most prosperousportion of the Narmada Valley north of the river.
- There is no road at present between Maheshwar and the Agra-Bombay Road and none is likely to be built for some time, as the Karam river forming the Dhar—Indore boundary intervenes and the Dhar Darbar have no inducement to contribute to the cost of one bridge or to construct the length of road in their territory . There is a motorservice to Barwaha from Maheshwar and neighbouring town of Mandleshwar which meets all existing requirements, but if more were needed a branch line could be built from Barwaha.
- The Baroda Government replied that they had no objection to the proposed extension of the Bodeli—Chhota Udaipur Railway towards Central India. As regards the alignment, they were inclined to prefer a line to Barwaha via Alirajpur, Kuksi, Singana, Bakaner and Dharampuri.
- They were not in favour of a line to Khandwa via Barwani as such a line would have to cross the Narmada at some point.

== Education ==
The city has ICSE,CBSE as well as Board of Secondary Education, Madhya Pradesh schools.

== Abstract ==
A resident of this town, Gagandeep Singh Bhatia, has been on the show Kaun Banega Crorepati in front of Sri Amitabh Bachchan. Another resident of the city, Aman Bhandari has been on the special series 'Best Of Test' at Star Sports and has been associated as a cricket analyst with them.

== Religious demography ==
The population of Barwaha city is 74.79% Hindu, 18.38% Muslim, 4.30% Jain, 2.08% Sikh and 0.29% Christian & 0.11% Buddhism.

Religion in Barwaha
Religion	Percent
Hindus	74.79%
Muslims	18.38%
Jains	4.30%
Sikhs	2.08%
Others†	0.4%
Christians	0.29%
Distribution of religions †Includes Buddhists (0.11%).

== Culture ==
Various cultural activities are held throughout the year. Residents of the city, belonging to different religions, celebrate various festivals such as Diwali, Eid, Holi, Christmas etc. with harmony and peace. Other than the regular festivals, certain festivals are local to the region such as Gangaur.

There are other cultural events held in the city throughout the year. There are various book fairs, art fairs, etc. Many local festivals celebrated with joy and happiness, such as 'Nag Panchami' (a day celebrated for snakes which are respected and worshipped like a god in Hindu mythology), or Bhagoriya (a festival celebrated by tribal people in the region).

Narmada Jayanti

Narmada Jayanti is held in Barwaha. A grand ceremony is organized every year on the eve of Narmada Jayanti. The festival held every year at the banks of Narmada River. During this event, different arts and cultural programs are held, such as displays of different dance forms and the cultural aspects of Nimar. The main attraction of this event is "PUSHP-VARSHA"(From the air Tulips of rose is spread using HELICOPTER) over all the Devotee present on the occasion of birthday of Maa Narmada.

Nimar Utsav

Nimar Utsav is another event held in Nimar. As the name suggests, it is the 'utsav' (celebration) or the festival held every year at the banks of Narmada River. During this event, different arts and cultural programs are held, such as displays of different dance forms and the cultural aspects of Nimar.

Rangpanchmi

Rangpanchami is celebrated five days after Dulendi or Holi, and has much bigger importance in Barwaha than main Holi festival itself. and is celebrated by people in their own distinct style. Here, it is celebrated like Dulendi, but natural colors with or without water are thrown out in the air or poured on others for the whole day by youngsters all over the city. On the event of the festival, the local municipal corporation sprinkles color mixed water on the main streets of Barwaha. Earlier Fire Brigade vehicles were used for this purpose. This stylized Rangpanchami celebration in Barwaha holds back its roots in the Holkar Reign and continues to be celebrated with the same vigor till date.

== Tourist attractions ==
There are many tourist attractions in Barwaha and it is referred as MINI HARIDWAR due to many adventurous as well as religious attractions.

Jayanti Mata Temple

Jayanti Mata Temple is a religious temple dedicated to Maa Durga.

Nageshwar Mandir

Lord Shiva temple surrounded by a kund is a major religious attraction of city.

Shri Dada Darbar

The city has a museum and hospital. It is named after Dadaji Dhuniwale, a mystic who lived in the town of Khandwa and healed people's miseries in uncommon way.

Narmada River

The Narmada River also called the Rewa River in central India and the fifth longest river in the Indian subcontinent. It is the fourth longest river that flows entirely within India, after the Ganga, the Godavari River, and the Krishna River. It is also known as "Life Line of Madhya Pradesh" for its huge contribution to the state of Madhya Pradesh in many ways.

Narmada Kothi (Maharajah of Indore Retreat Palace)

The Narmada Kothi (Maharajah of Indore Retreat Palace) is a Palace in the Indian municipality of Barwaha, it was constructed by the Maharajah of Indore as a Retreat Palace and used by him and his family to enjoy their holidays and take breaks from duties of ruling and managing the Princely State of Indore in pre-independent British India. The palace was built in European style.

Dense Forest

The city is surrounded by dense forest which is also a tourist attraction. Many people come here to celebrate Holi and Rang Panchmai.

Omkareshwar

Religious temple dedicated to Shivji Jortiliga
