= Thandla =

Thandla Thandla
- Municipal Town
- Nickname: Thandla
- Location in Madhya Pradesh, India Thandla (India)
- Coordinates: 23.0°N 74.57°E
- Country: India
- State: Madhya Pradesh
- District: Jhabua

Government
  - Type: Municipal Council
  - Body: Thandla Municipality
- Elevation: 271 m (889 ft)

Population (2001)
  - Total: 25,000

Languages
  - Official: Hindi
- Time zone: UTC+5:30 (IST)
- PIN: 457777
- ISO 3166 code: IN-MP
- Vehicle registration: MP

Thandla is a town in Thandla Tehsil in Jhabua District of Madhya Pradesh, India. It belongs to Indore Division. It is located 30 km north of the District headquarters of Jhabua. It is a Tehsil headquarter. Thandla was named after Bhil Sardar Thana.

== Geography ==
Thandla is located at 23.0°N 74.57°E. It has an average elevation of 271 metres (889 feet). Jhabua, Dahod, Ratlam, Banswara are nearby cities.

== Demographics ==
At the 2001 India census, Thandla had a population of 12,685. Males constituted 52% of the population and females 48%. Thandla had an average literacy rate of 73%, higher than the national average of 59.5%: male literacy was 80%, and female literacy 66%. 14% of the population were under 6 years of age.

== Educational organizations ==
There are number of educational institutions in Thandla, such as Government College, Thandla, and a Government Boys and Government Girls schools.

== Transport ==
Thandla Road railway station is situated 80 km (50 mi) from Ratlam Junction on Ratlam-Godhra section of Western Railways.Not many trains stop at stations except for few long distance and local trains. Station is 5 km (3.1 mi) away from the town, however transportation is generally available for commuters.

- The nearest airport is indore.
