= Raghavji =

Indian politician

Raghavji (born 7 July 1934) is an Indian politician. He was a member of Madhya Pradesh Vidhan Sabha from Vidisha. He had been a member of the Lok Sabha and the Rajya Sabha. He served as a cabinet minister (finance minister) in the Bharatiya Janata Party ministry in Madhya Pradesh state until early July 2013. He resigned over allegations of sexually harassing domestic help on 5 July 2013. He was expelled from the BJP and later arrested from an apartment in Bhopal on 5 July 2013. Almost 10 years later, MP high court later quashed the FIR against him in June 2023.
