= Dhamnod =

- Town
- Location in Madhya Pradesh, India Dhamnod (India)
- Coordinates: 22.22°N 75.47°E
- Country: India
- State: Madhya Pradesh
- District: Dhar
- Elevation: 163 m (535 ft)

Population (2021 census)
  - Total: About 100k

Languages
  - Official: Hindi
- Time zone: UTC+5:30 (IST)
- Postal Code: 454552
- ISO 3166 code: IN-MP
- Vehicle registration: MP 11

Dhamnod is a town and a nagar parishad in Dhar district in the state of Madhya Pradesh, India.

== Demographics ==
In the 2001 Indian census, Dhamnod had a population of about 100,000. Males constituted 52% of the population and females 48%. Dhamnod had an average literacy rate of 78.9%, male literacy was 68% and, female literacy was 51%.

=== Agriculture ===
Major crops grown during kharif are Cotton, Soyabean, Maize, Jowar, and crops grown during Rabi season include wheat, Gram, Moong.

The mandi in Dhamnod is the largest agricultural market in the region, attracting farmers from three surrounding districts. It serves as a vital trading hub where local produce is bought and sold, supporting the livelihoods of countless farmers.
