= Alirajpur =

Alirajpur city Alirajpur city
- City
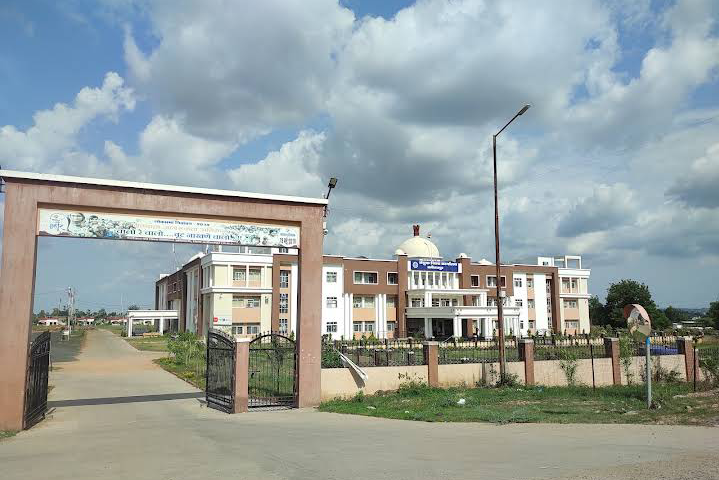
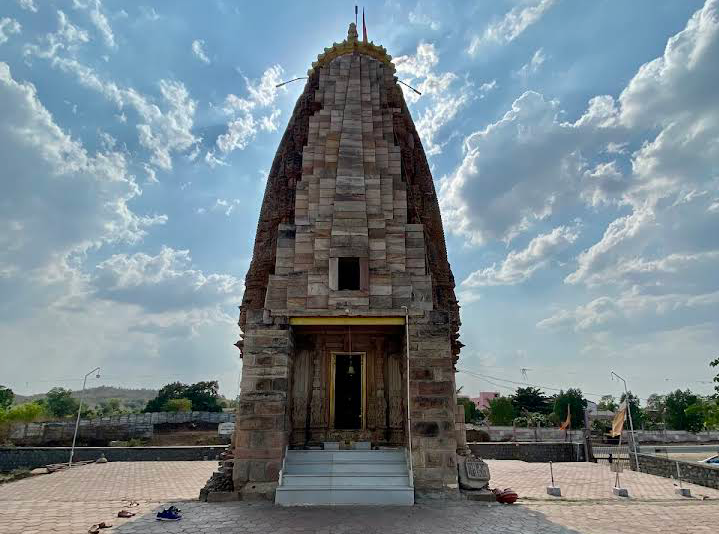
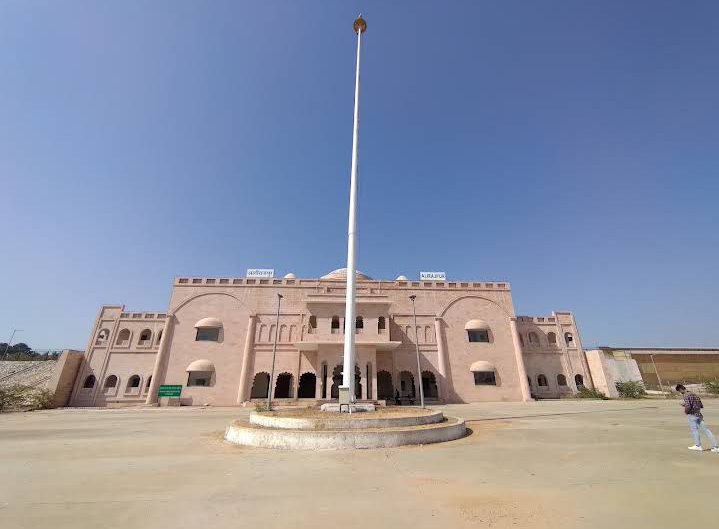
- Collecter Building Alirajpur Panchlingeshwar Temple; Railway Station Alirajpur

- Location in Madhya Pradesh, India Alirajpur city (India)
- Coordinates: 22°18′20.21″N 74°21′19.532″E
- Country: India
- State: Madhya Pradesh
- District: Alirajpur district
- Named for: King Alia Bhil

Population (2011)
  - Total: 28,498

Languages hindi, aadiwasi
  - Official: Hindi, English
- Time zone: UTC+5:30 (IST)
- PIN: 457887
- Vehicle registration: MP-69
- Climate: Tropical savanna climate
- Website: alirajpur.nic.in

Alirajpur is a city in the Alirajpur tehsil in Alirajpur district in the state of Madhya Pradesh, India.

Alirajpur State was formerly a princely state of India, under the Bhopawar Agency in Central India. It lay in the Malwa region of Madhya Pradesh, near the border with Gujarat and Maharashtra. It had an area of 836 m^{2}. It had been from time to time under British administration. The Victoria bridge at Alirajpur was built to commemorate the Diamond Jubilee of 1897.

== Demographics ==
As of the 2001 India census, Alirajpur had a population of 25,161. Males constitute 52% of the population and females 48%. 15% of the population is under 6 years of age.

== History ==
During the British Raj Alirajpur was the capital of Alirajpur State, one of the princely states of India. After India got independence in the year 1947, the ruling family of Alirajpur State moved to Delhi, where the last ruler of Ali Rajpur, Surendra Singh, subsequently served as the Ambassador of India to Spain in the 1980s.

== Geography ==
Alirajpur's topography is predominantly hilly. Area-wise, the former Alirajpur taluka was larger than the Jhabua taluka of Jhabua district. Alirajpur district was carved out of the former Jhabua district on 17 May 2008.. The Rajwara fort is situated in the centre of the town.

== Climate ==
Climate data for Alirajpur (1991–2020)
Month	Jan	Feb	Mar	Apr	May	Jun	Jul	Aug	Sep	Oct	Nov	Dec	Year
Record high °C (°F)	35.0 (95.0)	38.0 (100.4)	42.4 (108.3)	46.2 (115.2)	46.0 (114.8)	43.6 (110.5)	39.8 (103.6)	37.4 (99.3)	38.0 (100.4)	44.5 (112.1)	39.5 (103.1)	38.0 (100.4)	47.5 (117.5)
Mean daily maximum °C (°F)	26.0 (78.8)	29.3 (84.7)	34.5 (94.1)	37.5 (99.5)	38.2 (100.8)	35.1 (95.2)	29.9 (85.8)	28.5 (83.3)	29.9 (85.8)	32.1 (89.8)	29.4 (84.9)	26.9 (80.4)	31.4 (88.5)
Mean daily minimum °C (°F)	9.5 (49.1)	11.5 (52.7)	15.0 (59.0)	20.1 (68.2)	23.3 (73.9)	21.9 (71.4)	20.7 (69.3)	20.1 (68.2)	20.0 (68.0)	17.3 (63.1)	13.8 (56.8)	9.7 (49.5)	17.0 (62.6)
Record low °C (°F)	0.0 (32.0)	3.6 (38.5)	6.9 (44.4)	13.0 (55.4)	16.0 (60.8)	18.4 (65.1)	17.2 (63.0)	16.4 (61.5)	12.0 (53.6)	11.0 (51.8)	5.0 (41.0)	2.2 (36.0)	0.0 (32.0)
Average rainfall mm (inches)	0.0 (0.0)	0.0 (0.0)	0.1 (0.00)	0.0 (0.0)	0.0 (0.0)	85.8 (3.38)	209.2 (8.24)	140.6 (5.54)	110.7 (4.36)	11.2 (0.44)	1.0 (0.04)	0.0 (0.0)	558.5 (21.99)
Average rainy days	0.0	0.0	0.0	0.0	0.1	2.4	10.2	6.1	3.8	0.8	0.1	0.0	23.5
Average relative humidity (%) (at 17:30 IST)	46	33	28	30	35	52	75	78	72	52	50	51	49
Source: India Meteorological Department

== Economy ==
Its economy depends primarily on agricultural endeavours, especially farming, especially mangoes. The agricultural trading yard in Alirajpur is the biggest in the state when it comes to mango trading. Alirajpur is also a hub for dolomite business.

In terms of industrial development, Alirajpur thrives in sectors like textiles, handlooms, and agro-based industries. However, its true economic backbone lies in agriculture, with a significant focus on the production of Mahua. Mahua, derived from the flowers of the Mahua tree, its immense economic potential and cultural significance.

== Places to Interest ==
Panchlingeshwar, This temple is quite famous due to its amazing architecture. This temple has been built by hand carving on stones, in which small temples have been carved in the same shape as this temple and these also include figures of ancient gods and goddesses. This ancient Panchalingeshwar Mahadev temple is located at a distance of about 5 kilometers from Alirajpur.

== Transport ==
On 30 October 2019, a new railway line was inaugurated between Alirajpur station and Pratapnagar station in Vadodara. Alirajpur is connected by bus to Indore and nearby districts.
