= Newaj River =

River in Malwa Region

Coordinates: 25.5331°N 76.2820°E

The Newaj is a river in Madhya Pradesh and Rajasthan, India. It is a tributary of the Kali Sindh River. The Newaj River flows through Sehore, Shajapur, and Rajgarh District of Madhya Pradesh and Jhalawar District of Rajasthan. Jawar, Shujalpur, Pachore and Rajgarh towns are located on bank of the river.

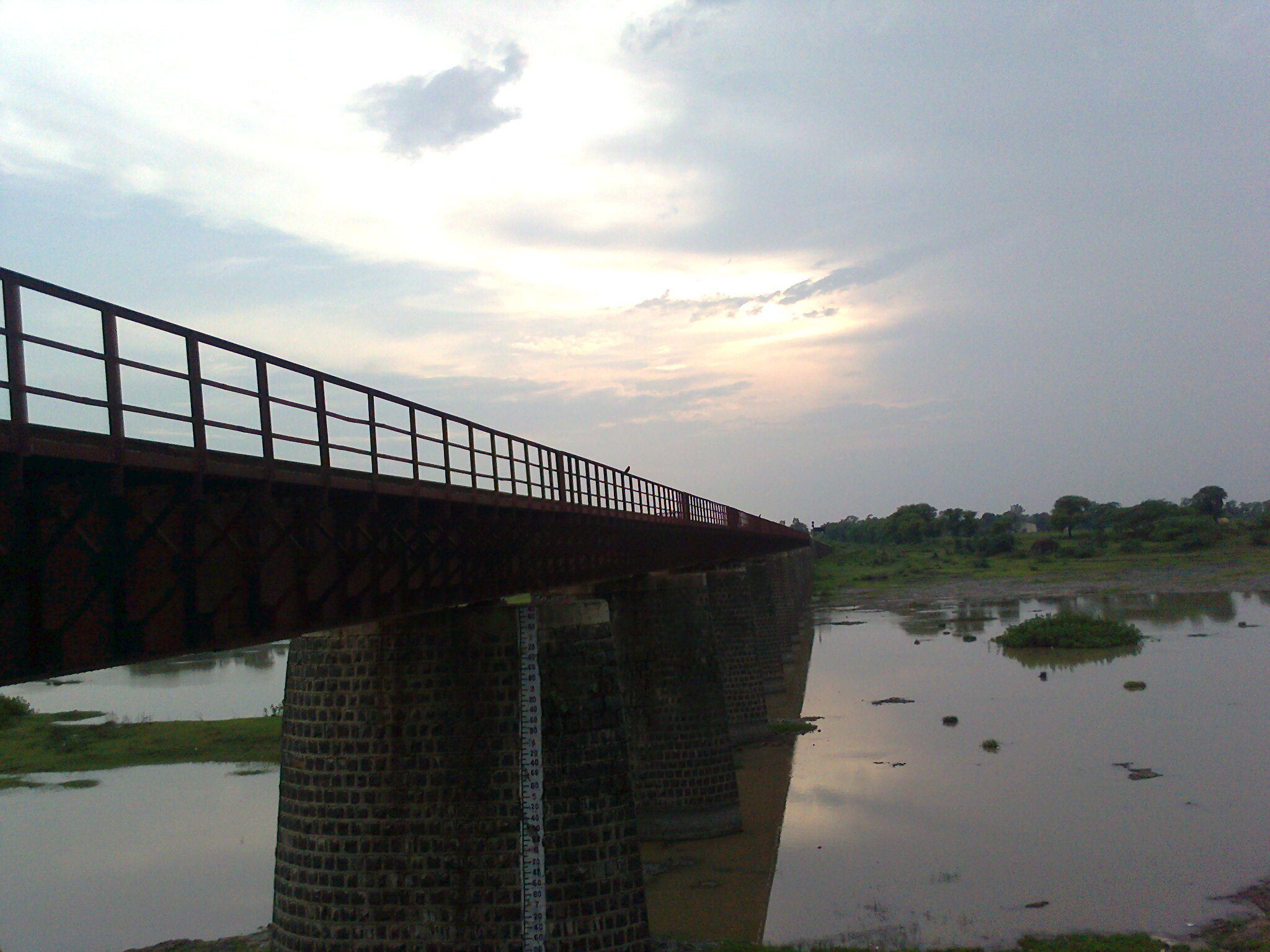
Newaj River In Rajgarh

The Newaj is a right bank principal tributary of the Kali Sindh. The Newaj River reaches an elevation of 634 m in the Ashta of Sehore District in Madhya Pradesh and traverses 220 km, of which 205 km is in Madhya Pradesh.

Mohanpura dam site is located in Mohanpura village of Biaora tehsil of Rajgarh. Mohanpura Dam is 8 km from Rajgarh. The catchment area intercepted at the dam site is 3726 km^{2}. Mohanpura dam proposes to provide water for irrigation, domestic and industrial uses.

A 15-day fair is organized on Rangpanchami in Avantipur Barodiya, located in Shujalpur Block in Shajapur District of Madhya Pradesh. The fair is held in the dry premises of the Newaj river, attended by thousands of devotees.
