= Bandikhedi =

Bandikhedi may refer to:

- Bandikhedi (census code 482082), a village in Madhya Pradesh, India; located on the bank of the Parbati River, near Bijawan Kalan
- Bandikhedi (census code 482303), a village in Madhya Pradesh, India; located beside the Guna-Bhopal road, between Hinoti Sadak and Jetpura
