= Jhagariya Khurd =

Jhagariya Khurd may refer to:

- Jhagariya Khurd (census code 482441), a village in Madhya Pradesh, India; located on the National Highway 12, near Barrai and Babadiya Khurd
- Jhagariya Khurd (census code 482501), a village in Madhya Pradesh, India; located on the Bhopal-Sehore road, between Semri Bayzaft and Badjhiri
