= Budhni Assembly constituency =

Constituency of the Madhya Pradesh legislative assembly in India

Coordinates: 22.78°N 77.68°E

Budhni
- Constituency No. 156 for the Madhya Pradesh Legislative Assembly

Constituency details
- Country: India
- Region: Central India
- State: Madhya Pradesh
- District: Sehore
- Lok Sabha constituency: Vidisha
- Established: 1957
- Reservation: None

Member of Legislative Assembly
- 16th Madhya Pradesh Legislative Assembly
- Incumbent Ramakant Bhargava
- Party: Bharatiya Janata Party
- Elected year: 2023
- Preceded by: Shivraj Singh Chouhan

Budhni Assembly constituency is one of the 230 Vidhan Sabha (Legislative Assembly) constituencies of Madhya Pradesh state in central India. It is a segment of Vidisha (Lok Sabha constituency). Budhni (constituency number 156) is one of the 4 Vidhan Sabha constituencies located in Sehore district.

== Members of the Legislative Assembly ==
=== Bhopal Legislative Assembly ===
Election	Name	Party
1952	Lakshmi Narayan	Indian National Congress

=== Madhya Pradesh Legislative Assembly ===
Election	Name	Party
1957	Rajkumari Suraj Kala	Indian National Congress
1962	Bansi Dhar	Independent
1967	Mohan Lal Shishir	Bharatiya Jana Sangh
1972	Shaligram Vakil	Bharatiya Jana Sangh
1977	Shaligram Vakil	Bharatiya Jana Sangh
1980	K. N. Pradhan	Indian National Congress
1985	Chauhan Singh	Indian National Congress
1990	Shivraj Singh Chouhan	Bharatiya Janata Party
1992*	Mohan Lal Shishir	Bharatiya Janata Party
1993	Raj Kumar Patel	Indian National Congress
1998	Dev Kumar Patel	Indian National Congress
2003	Rajendra Singh	Bharatiya Janata Party
2006*	Shivraj Singh Chouhan	Bharatiya Janata Party
2008	Shivraj Singh Chouhan	Bharatiya Janata Party
2013	Shivraj Singh Chouhan	Bharatiya Janata Party
2018	Shivraj Singh Chouhan	Bharatiya Janata Party
2023	Shivraj Singh Chouhan	Bharatiya Janata Party
2024*	Ramakant Bhargava	Bharatiya Janata Party

- *By Poll

== Election results ==
=== 2024 bypoll ===
Madhya Pradesh Legislative Assembly by-election 2024: Budhni
Party	Candidate	Votes	%	±%
BJP	Ramakant Bhargava	107,478	50.32	▼20.38
INC	Raj Kumar Patel	93,577	43.82	▲18.11
NOTA	None of the Above	463	0.22	▼0.51
Majority		13,901	6.50	▼38.49
Turnout		2,13,568	77.07	▼7.79
BJP hold		Swing	▼20.38	

=== 2023 ===
2023 Madhya Pradesh Legislative Assembly election: Budhni
Party	Candidate	Votes	%	±%
BJP	Shivraj Singh Chouhan	164,951	70.7	▲10.45
INC	Vikram Mastal Sharma	59,977	25.71	▼5.76
ASP(KR)	Dinesh Azad	2,363	1.01	
NOTA	None of the above	1,700	0.73	▼0.13
Majority		104,974	44.99	▲16.21
Turnout		233,314	85.18	▲1.54
BJP hold		Swing	▲10.45	

=== 2018 ===
2018 Madhya Pradesh Legislative Assembly election: Budhni
Party	Candidate	Votes	%	±%
BJP	Shivraj Singh Chouhan	123,492	60.25	
INC	Arun Subhashchandra Yadav	64,493	31.47	
GGP	Revaram Sallam	8,152	3.98	
NOTA	None of the above	1,764	0.86	
Majority		58,999	28.78	
Turnout		204,950	83.64	
BJP hold		Swing	▼9.74	

=== 2013 ===
2013 Madhya Pradesh Legislative Assembly election: Budhni
Party	Candidate	Votes	%	±%
BJP	Shivraj Singh Chouhan	128,730	69.99	
INC	Dr. Mahendra Singh Chouhan	43,925	23.88	
PRSP	Brijesh Kumar	2,393	1.30	
BSP	Balram Yadav	2,096	1.14	
Independent	Sursari Prasad	1,707	0.93	
NOTA	None of the Above	2,247	1.22	
Majority		84,805	46.11	
Turnout		1,83,939	80.18	
BJP hold		Swing		

=== 2008 ===
2008 Madhya Pradesh Legislative Assembly election: Budhni
Party	Candidate	Votes	%	±%
BJP	Shivraj Singh Chouhan	75,828	62.15	
INC	Mahesh Singh Rajput	34,303	28.12	
Independent	Vijay Kumar	2,568	2.10	
LJP	Ram Singh Choudhary	1,729	1.42	
BSP	Manoj Kumar Rajak	1,416	1.16	
Majority		41,525	34.03	
Turnout		1,22,007	72.59	
BJP hold		Swing		

=== 2006 bypoll ===
2006 Madhya Pradesh Legislative Assembly by-election: Budhni
Party	Candidate	Votes	%	±%
BJP	Shivraj Singh Chouhan	66,689	59.07	
INC	Raj Kumar Patel	30,164	26.72	
GGP	Gulzar Singh Markam	7,900	7.00	
Independent	Santosh Gaur	2,085	1.85	
Independent	Ram Neta	1,284	1.14	
Majority		36,525	32.35	
Turnout		1,12,889	64.57	
BJP hold		Swing		

=== 2003 ===
- Rajendra Singh (BJP): 58,052 votes
- Rajkumar Patel (INC): 47,616

=== 1957 ===
- Rajkumari Surajkala (INC): 9,672 votes
- Mathura Prasad (IND): 8,967
