= Nasrullaganj =

- Town
- Location in Madhya Pradesh, India Nasrullaganj (India) Nasrullaganj (Asia)
- Coordinates: 22°40′58″N 77°16′26″E
- Country: India
- State: Madhya Pradesh
- District: Sehore

Government
  - Type: Nagar Parishad
  - Body: B.J.P.

Area
  - Total: 5 km^{2} (1.9 sq mi)

Population (2011)
  - Total: 23,788
  - Density: 4,800/km^{2} (12,000/sq mi)

Language
  - Official: Hindi
- Time zone: UTC5:30 (IST)
- Postal code: 466331
- ISO 3166 code: IN-MP
- Vehicle registration: MP 37

Nasrullaganj, also known as Bherunda or Bhairunda, is a nagar panchayat in Sehore district in the Indian state of Madhya Pradesh. The nearest airport is in Bhopal.

== Renaming ==
On 24 April 2022, Shivraj Singh Chouhan (the Chief Minister of Madhya Pradesh), told a meeting in Bhopal that "a proposal to change the name of Nasrullaganj as Bherunda has been sent to the Centre". "State BJP secretary Rajnish Agrawal had claimed that changing the name of Nasrullaganj was an old demand of local citizens." After the Indian Ministry of Home Affairs approved the change, the state published a notice in the gazette on 2 April 2023, announcing the renaming of Nasrullaganj in Sehore district: the new name is spelled either Bhairunda or Bherunda.

== Demographics ==
As of 2011 Indian Census, Nasrullaganj nagar panchayat had a total population of 23,788, of which 12,599 were males and 11,189 were females. Population within the age group of 0 to 6 years was 3,215. The total number of literates in Nasrullaganj was 17,073, which constituted 71.8% of the population with male literacy of 77.3% and female literacy of 65.6%. The effective literacy rate of 7+ population of Nasrullaganj was 83.0%, of which male literacy rate was 89.1% and female literacy rate was 76.1%. The Scheduled Castes and Scheduled Tribes population was 2,961 and 1,743 respectively. Nasrullaganj had 4671 households in 2011.

According to the 2001 census, the Nasrullaganj nagar panchayat had a population of 17,240 of which 9,271 are males while 7,969 are females as per report released by Census India 2001. Population of children with age of 0-6 is 2,542. In Nasrullaganj Nagar Panchayat, the female sex ratio is 860. Moreover, the child sex ratio in Nasrullaganj is around 796. The literacy rate of Nasrullaganj is 66.10% of which male literacy is around 73.8% while the female literacy rate is 57.13%.

== Transportation ==
=== By road ===
Nasrullaganj is around 80–90 km from Bhopal and around 169km from Indore by road.

=== By train ===
Nasrullaganj within 100 km of the five major railway stations namely, Budhni (50 km), Hoshangabad (60 km), Itarsi (75 km) and Sehore (78 km).

=== By air ===
Raja Bhoj Airport in Bhopal and Devi Ahilya Bai Holkar Airport in Indore are nearest to the city.

== Places of Interest ==
Nasrullaganj and its surrounding region host several culturally significant and scenic destinations:

- Salkanpur Dham
- Kolar Dam
- Kubereshwar Dham
- Ratapani Jungle Safari
- Ginnorgarh Fort
