= Barrai =

Barrai may refer to:

- Barrai, Berasia, a village in Madhya Pradesh, India
- Barrai, Huzur, a village in Madhya Pradesh, India
