= Jhagariya Khurd (census code 482501) =

- Village
- Location within Madhya Pradesh Location within India
- Coordinates: 23.1520404°N 77.27781057°E
- Country: India
- State: Madhya Pradesh
- District: Bhopal
- Tehsil: Huzur
- Elevation: 532 m (1,745 ft)

Population (2011)
  - Total: 580
- Time zone: UTC+5:30 (IST)
- ISO 3166 code: MP-IN
- Census code: 482501

Jhagariya Khurd is a village in the Bhopal district of Madhya Pradesh, India. It is located in the Huzur tehsil and the Phanda block.

It is located on the Bhopal-Sehore road, between Semri Bazyaft and Badjhiri.

== Demographics ==
According to the 2011 census of India, Jhagariya Khurd has 131 households. The effective literacy rate (i.e. the literacy rate of population excluding children aged 6 and below) is 64.3%.

Demographics (2011 Census)
	Total	Male	Female
Population	580	306	274
Children aged below 6 years	101	56	45
Scheduled caste	263	128	135
Scheduled tribe	99	51	48
Literates	308	177	131
Workers (all)	210	129	81
Main workers (total)	199	125	74
Main workers: Cultivators	32	30	2
Main workers: Agricultural labourers	125	72	53
Main workers: Household industry workers	5	1	4
Main workers: Other	37	22	15
Marginal workers (total)	11	4	7
Marginal workers: Cultivators	3	1	2
Marginal workers: Agricultural labourers	4	2	2
Marginal workers: Household industry workers	2	0	2
Marginal workers: Others	2	1	1
Non-workers	370	177	193
