= Wolves of Ashta =

1985/86 man-eating wolves in India

The Wolves of Ashta were a pack of 6 man-eating Indian wolves which between the last quarter of 1985 to January 1986, killed 17 children in Ashta, Madhya Pradesh, a town in the Sehore district. The pack consisted of two adult males, one adult female, one subadult female and two pups. Initially thought to be a lone animal, the fear caused by the wolves had serious repercussions on the life of the villagers within their hunting range. Farmers became too frightened to leave their huts, leaving crops out of cultivation, and several parents prohibited their children from attending school, for fear that the man-eaters would catch them on the way. So great was their fear, that some village elders doubted the man-eaters were truly wolves at all, but Shaitans. With the exception of the pups, which were adopted by Pardhi tribesmen, all wolves were killed by hunters and forest officials.

== First victims ==
The first officially recognised victim was a boy of eight, killed in the village of Foodra near Dodi Ghati, in the third week of November. The boy was playing near his family's jowar field, when one of the wolves grabbed him and carried him into the forest. The boy's parents, brandishing a lathi, pursued the wolf, which upon seeing them, left the child, who was by then dead, with his abdominal cavity torn open.

The second victim was a baby boy taken from the village of Amala Majju. The child had been left in a sari hammock whilst his mother worked in the nearby fields. Upon returning to feed her son, she found the hammock empty. A search party was organised, and after a few hours of fruitless searching, a splash of blood was found on a leaf. A little further, the child's bloodied clothing was found caught on a Lantana bush. The villagers brought the matter to the attention of the Dodi Forest Officials, who passed the information onto the Ashta Range Officer, who in turn informed the District Forest Officer at Sehore. The Officer sent officials to the village, who upon inspecting the site of the killing, found the tracks of a large male wolf.

== First hunting strategy ==
A group of hunters and government men, intent on formulating a strategy to tackle the wolf, congregated at a house in the village of Dodi, situated on the banks of the Dudhi river which was at the heart of the wolf's killing range. Among them were Ajay Singh Yadav, the Collector of the Sehore District, Bruno D’cruz the district superintendent of police, Chaudhry the Divisional Forest Officer and his two assistants Shrivastava and Naqvi, and Kaurav the Sub Divisional Officer of Ashta. It was decided that baits in the form of goats and sheep would be tied up at waterholes or game trails frequented by the man-eater in Rupahera, Amla Mazzu, Gwala, Arnia Gazi and the Dodi Plateau. Shikaris with 12-gauge shotguns would sit over these baits. Police pickets would be posted at all affected villages to boost morale, and mobile patrolling parties would move through the area at all times. These strategies had no effect on the killings, which continued regardless.

== Killing of the first wolf ==
A fortnight after the unsuccessful strategy had been mobilised, a farmer named “Dr. Haidar”, who was a friend of Yadav the Collector, went alone to the hills near the village of Amla Mazzu, where he knew the man-eater sometimes frequented. After finding a cavern containing two wolf pups, Haidar left for the village of Pardhikhera, where he asked assistance from the local Pardhi chieftain Rajaram. The Pardhis were skilled trappers, and gladly assisted in the hunt by digging a small pit about 1.2 to 1.8 metres (3.9 to 5.9 ft) wide outside the den. The pit was covered in vegetation, with the two pups tied to a pole near it. When the sun reached its western horizon, the she-wolf returned, and upon seeing its pups, rushed into the trap, where it was immediately killed by the Pardhis. The wolf pups were later adopted by the Pardhis. Although upon examination, the she-wolf's stomach contents were shown to contain strands of human hair and fragments of human bone, the animal was smaller than what had been described by witnesses and estimations on the previous attacker's tracks. It was concluded from that point on that a whole pack rather than a solitary animal was involved in the killings. This was confirmed when, a month after the first child killings being reported, a sadhu in the Dodi Plateau was attacked while sleeping outside his temple of Shiva. He managed to fight off the wolf by throwing a burning ember from a nearby fire onto its face, causing the animal to retreat. The sadhu survived, though with a large laceration on his left shoulder.

== Killing of the second wolf ==
A hunter from Bhopal by the name of Hafiz-ur-Rahman (Shahzade), a rifle and jeep owner who had killed tigers and a leopard, was drafted to help kill the wolves when a farmer stated that one of the wolves had just killed one of his lambs, and that they could still catch it if they made haste. After a five-minute car journey following the farmer's directions, the wolf was seen standing over the lamb's body. Shahzade killed the wolf with one shot. After this, Shahzade was rewarded 2,000 Rs and offered a job as a police sub-inspector, but he declined the job offer.

== Encounter with the last two wolves ==
During a ceremonial visit of the minister of Bhopal and his bodyguard, Yadav spotted fresh wolf tracks on a road heading in the direction of the village of Pardhikera. Yadav, along with Ram Singh the home guard jawan, and the minister's bodyguard. Upon arriving at Pardhikera, the young Pardhis pointed to the direction the wolf went. The tracks were headed to outcrops of black basaltic rock situated on a stony lava plane. Two wolves were sighted in the distance, and after positioning themselves on the wolves route, the trio waited. When the wolves came, the bodyguard fired prematurely at them with his Sten gun, causing the wolves to retreat.

== Killing of the third wolf ==
Yadav was contacted by a mango cultivator named Achan Mian who lived outside the village of Khadi. Yadav was told that two wolves had been repeatedly seen in the orchard, possibly attracted by the grazing goats. Yadav planned to stay at the orchard at nightfall with the goats in order to catch the man-eaters. Dressed as a shepherd and armed with a shotgun, Yadav stayed awake all night in the goat pen until a wolf was seen trying to enter the pen. Yadav killed the young female wolf.

== Killing of the last wolf ==
On January 2, 1986, Yaddav, Ram Singh, Naqvi and a judge named Siddique went to a hill frequently patrolled by the wolf in the vicinity of the road between Amla Mazzu and the Dodi Plateau. There, the team produced a lifelike dummy of a human child dressed in well worn clothes in order to better imitate a human scent. The group hid in nearby bushes, with Ram Singh imitating the cries of a human child to attract the wolf. By nightfall, the wolf was heard howling several times, and after a few minutes, it arrived, heading for the dummy. The group flashed a torch at the wolf and fired at it twice with two 12-gauge shotguns. The wolf fell gasping and was finished with a shot from Naqvi. The animal was a large, dark furred male in prime condition with no infirmities to indicate why it had resorted to man-eating. The animal's death coincided with an end to the attacks.

== See also ==
- List of wolves
- List of wolf attacks
- Wolf attacks on humans
