= Raj Kumar Patel =

Indian politician and social worker

Personal details
- Born: Baktara, Sehore, Madhya Pradesh
- Party: Indian National Congress

Raj Kumar Patel is social worker and a member of Indian National Congress in Bhopal, Madhya Pradesh. A leader of the Indian National Congress, he was MLA, Budhni 1993-1998 and also Minister of State for School Education, Sports and Youth Affairs, Govt. of Madhya Pradesh. He was also the President of National Students Union of India, Madhya Pradesh and a Member of the All India Congress Committee.

== Early life and education ==
Raj Kumar Patel was born to the Kirar Thakur family in the Baktara village of Sehore district. He is a M. A. LLB. from Govt. Hamidia Arts, Commerce and Law College, Bhopal, Barkatullah University, Bhopal. He was Agriculturist by profession prior to politics.कांग्रेस पार्टी
