= Pipakhedi =

- village
- Location within Madhya Pradesh Location within India
- Coordinates: 23.837280°N 77.225707°E
- Country: India
- State: Madhya Pradesh
- District: Bhopal
- Tehsil: Berasia

Population (2011)
  - Total: 372
- Time zone: UTC+5:30 (IST)
- ISO 3166 code: MP-IN
- Census code: 482053

Pipakhedi is a village in the Bhopal district of Madhya Pradesh, India. It is located in the Berasia tehsil, on the banks of Parbati River.

== Demographics ==
According to the 2011 census of India, Pipakhedi has 65 households. The effective literacy rate (i.e. the literacy rate of population excluding children aged 6 and below) is 57.7%.

Demographics (2011 Census)
	Total	Male	Female
Population	372	195	177
Children aged below 6 years	67	30	37
Scheduled caste	86	44	42
Scheduled tribe	45	19	26
Literates	176	115	61
Workers (all)	136	89	47
Main workers (total)	118	85	33
Main workers: Cultivators	82	66	16
Main workers: Agricultural labourers	32	17	15
Main workers: Household industry workers	1	1	0
Main workers: Other	3	1	2
Marginal workers (total)	18	4	14
Marginal workers: Cultivators	3	1	2
Marginal workers: Agricultural labourers	14	3	11
Marginal workers: Household industry workers	0	0	0
Marginal workers: Others	1	0	1
Non-workers	236	106	130
