= Jhagariya Khurd (census code 482441) =

- village
- Location within Madhya Pradesh Location within India
- Coordinates: 23.192771°N 77.514666°E
- Country: India
- State: Madhya Pradesh
- District: Bhopal
- Tehsil: Huzur

Population (2011)
  - Total: 628
- Time zone: UTC+5:30 (IST)
- ISO 3166 code: MP-IN
- Census code: 482441

Jhagariya Khurd is a village in the Bhopal district of Madhya Pradesh, India. It is located in the Huzur tehsil and the Phanda block.

It is located on National Highway 12, near Barrai and Babadiya Khurd.

== Demographics ==
According to the 2011 census of India, Jhagariya Khurd has 119 households. The effective literacy rate (i.e. the literacy rate of population excluding children aged 6 and below) is 54.84%.

Demographics (2011 Census)
	Total	Male	Female
Population	628	336	292
Children aged below 6 years	101	46	55
Scheduled caste	124	63	61
Scheduled tribe	111	60	51
Literates	289	195	94
Workers (all)	229	156	73
Main workers (total)	225	154	71
Main workers: Cultivators	17	15	2
Main workers: Agricultural labourers	1	1	0
Main workers: Household industry workers	5	1	4
Main workers: Other	202	137	65
Marginal workers (total)	4	2	2
Marginal workers: Cultivators	4	2	2
Marginal workers: Agricultural labourers	0	0	0
Marginal workers: Household industry workers	0	0	0
Marginal workers: Others	0	0	0
Non-workers	399	180	219
