= Bankot village =

Bankot Village
- Village
- Location in Madhya Pradesh, India Bankot Village (India)
- Coordinates: 22.719113431363777°N 77.09843025340123°E
- Country: India
- State: Madhya Pradesh
- District: Sehore

Languages
  - Official: Hindi
- Time zone: UTC+5:30 (IST)
- PIN: 466331
- Telephone code: 07563
- ISO 3166 code: IN-MP
- Vehicle registration: MP 37

Bankot Village is a town and a Panchayat in Sehore district in the Indian state of Madhya Pradesh. Bakot Village is a major agricultural production area in Madhya Pradesh. Earlier.As of 2001 India census,
