= Pipaliya Dhakad =

- Village
- Location within Madhya Pradesh Location within India
- Coordinates: 23.2240662°N 77.2318934°E
- Country: India
- State: Madhya Pradesh
- District: Bhopal
- Tehsil: Huzur
- Elevation: 513 m (1,683 ft)

Population (2011)
  - Total: 866
- Time zone: UTC+5:30 (IST)
- ISO 3166 code: IN-MP
- 2011 census code: 482484

Pipaliya Dhakad is a village in the Bhopal district of Madhya Pradesh, India. It is located in the Huzur tehsil and the Phanda block.

The road connecting this village to Sehore road was the first road constructed using plastic waste in Madhya Pradesh.

== Demographics ==
According to the 2011 census of India, Pipaliya Dhakad has 183 households. The effective literacy rate (i.e. the literacy rate of population excluding children aged 6 and below) is 72.99%.

Demographics (2011 Census)
	Total	Male	Female
Population	866	446	420
Children aged below 6 years	133	61	72
Scheduled caste	62	33	29
Scheduled tribe	33	20	13
Literates	535	313	222
Workers (all)	453	244	209
Main workers (total)	181	154	27
Main workers: Cultivators	90	84	6
Main workers: Agricultural labourers	49	35	14
Main workers: Household industry workers	5	5	0
Main workers: Other	37	30	7
Marginal workers (total)	272	90	182
Marginal workers: Cultivators	87	13	74
Marginal workers: Agricultural labourers	139	52	87
Marginal workers: Household industry workers	6	1	5
Marginal workers: Others	40	24	16
Non-workers	413	202	211
