= Sri Satya Sai University of Technology & Medical Sciences =

Private university in Madhya Pradesh

- श्री सत्य साई प्रौद्योगिकी एवं चिकित्सा विज्ञान विश्वविद्यालय
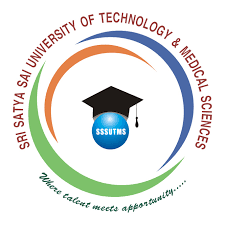
- Motto: "Where Talent Meets Opportunity"
- Type: Private
- Established: 1999 (24 years ago)
- Affiliations: UGC, AIU, PCI, NCTE, COA, AICTE, DHE,
- Chancellor: Dr. Siddharth Kumar
- Vice-Chancellor: Dr. Mukesh Tiwari
- Location: Sehore, Madhya Pradesh, India; 23°12′57.6″N 77°07′37.2″E
- Nickname: SSSUTMS
- Website: www.sssutms.co.in www.sssutms.ac.in

Sri Satya Sai University Of Technology And Medical Sciences (SSSUTMS) is a private university located in Sehore in Madhya Pradesh, India. Many students come to study from different states of India.

== History ==
Sri Satya Sai Campus, Sehore came into existence in 1999 with the Sri Satya Sai Institute of Science & Technology (SSSIST). SSSIST initially had three branches in engineering education with a total intake of 180.

In 2012, because of the vision of promoters, the Sehore Campus was operating twelve colleges, having twenty undergraduate courses & twenty Postgraduate courses, one post-graduate Diploma course & one Diploma course, with a total intake of 3054 students. Sri Satya Sai Group of Institutions attracts a large number of students from faraway places and states due to the quality of education at an affordable cost, without any hidden fees policy. In its history of fourteen years, various Institutions under the umbrella of the Sri Satya Sai Group of Institutions were the only Institutes in Sehore & nearby six districts offering technical education at affordable fees to worthy and needy students.

== Location ==
Sri Satya Sai University Of Technology And Medical Science is situated in a 180-acre (73 ha) site adjacent to Bhopal-Indore Road, Opp.Oil fed plant, and is about 4.9 kilometres (3.0 mi) from Sehore and 33.9 kilometres (21.1 mi) from Bhopal in Madhya Pradesh

== Schools ==
SSSUTMS has established the following schools:

- School of Engineering
- School of Computer Application
- School of Management Studies
- Faculty of Pharmacy
- School of Hotel Management
- School of Paramedical Studies
- Polytechnic (Engineering)
- School of Law
- School of Homoeopathy
- Faculty of Education
- School of Design
- School of Ayurveda and Siddha Studies

== Campus & Infrastructure ==
=== Campus ===
The university campus is spread over 180 acres in Pachama Village on the Sehore District in Madhya Pradesh.

=== Hostel ===
There are separate hostels for men and women on the campus. Each hostel is self-contained with amenities such as a reading room, an indoor games room, a lounge and a dining hall with a mess, a computer room and a TV in the common room. The Board for Hostel Management coordinates the various hostel activities. At present, the boys' hostel has a capacity of accommodating 252 students and the girls' hostel has a capacity of 100 girls. The mess of both hostels is run on a cooperative basis. The provision of separate rooms with air conditioners is available. A qualified medical attendant is available at the campus. Medical and hospital facilities are available in Sehore and the cost is met by the students. Mess and canteen facility are also available.

== See also ==
- List of universities in India
- Universities and colleges in India

=== External links ===
- sssutms.co.in
- sssutms.ac.in
