= Bandikhedi (census code 482303) =

- village
- Location within Madhya Pradesh Location within India
- Coordinates: 23.472233°N 77.405087°E
- Country: India
- State: Madhya Pradesh
- District: Bhopal
- Tehsil: Berasia

Population (2011)
  - Total: 476
- Time zone: UTC+5:30 (IST)
- ISO 3166 code: MP-IN
- Census code: 482303

Bandikhedi is a village in the Bhopal district of Madhya Pradesh, India. It is located in the Berasia tehsil.

It is located beside the Guna–Bhopal road, between Hinoti Sadak and Jetpura.

== Demographics ==
According to the 2011 census of India, Bandikhedi has 100 households. The effective literacy rate (i.e. the literacy rate of population excluding children aged 6 and below) is 78.91%.

Demographics (2011 Census)
	Total	Male	Female
Population	476	245	231
Children aged below 6 years	54	26	28
Scheduled caste	285	148	137
Scheduled tribe	4	1	3
Literates	333	193	140
Workers (all)	213	131	82
Main workers (total)	69	56	13
Main workers: Cultivators	27	23	4
Main workers: Agricultural labourers	13	10	3
Main workers: Household industry workers	15	12	3
Main workers: Other	14	11	3
Marginal workers (total)	144	75	69
Marginal workers: Cultivators	7	5	2
Marginal workers: Agricultural labourers	129	63	66
Marginal workers: Household industry workers	1	1	0
Marginal workers: Others	7	6	1
Non-workers	263	114	149
