= Bandikhedi (census code 482082) =

- village
- Location within Madhya Pradesh Location within India
- Coordinates: 23.736473°N 77.193034°E
- Country: India
- State: Madhya Pradesh
- District: Bhopal
- Tehsil: Berasia

Population (2011)
  - Total: 564
- Time zone: UTC+5:30 (IST)
- ISO 3166 code: MP-IN
- Census code: 482082

Bandikhedi is a village in the Bhopal district of Madhya Pradesh, India. It is located in the Berasia tehsil.

It is located on the bank of the Parbati River, near Bijawan Kalan, close to the Berasia road.

== Demographics ==
According to the 2011 census of India, Bandikhedi has 94 households. The effective literacy rate (i.e. the literacy rate of population excluding children aged 6 and below) is 58.41%.

Demographics (2011 Census)
	Total	Male	Female
Population	564	306	258
Children aged below 6 years	100	50	50
Scheduled caste	25	13	12
Scheduled tribe	0	0	0
Literates	271	180	91
Workers (all)	288	162	126
Main workers (total)	176	143	33
Main workers: Cultivators	166	137	29
Main workers: Agricultural labourers	5	4	1
Main workers: Household industry workers	0	0	0
Main workers: Other	5	2	3
Marginal workers (total)	112	19	93
Marginal workers: Cultivators	1	1	0
Marginal workers: Agricultural labourers	108	17	91
Marginal workers: Household industry workers	0	0	0
Marginal workers: Others	3	1	2
Non-workers	276	144	132
