= Ghogalpur =

- village
- Location within Madhya Pradesh Location within India
- Coordinates: 23.817514°N 77.231112°E
- Country: India
- State: Madhya Pradesh
- District: Bhopal
- Tehsil: Berasia

Population (2011)
  - Total: 587
- Time zone: UTC+5:30 (IST)
- ISO 3166 code: MP-IN
- Census code: 482054

Ghogalpur is a village in the Bhopal district of Madhya Pradesh, India. It is located in the Berasia tehsil, on the banks of Parbati River.

== Demographics ==
According to the 2011 census of India, Ghogalpur has 103 households. The effective literacy rate (i.e. the literacy rate of population excluding children aged 6 and below) is 54.86%.

Demographics (2011 Census)
	Total	Male	Female
Population	587	308	279
Children aged below 6 years	93	51	42
Scheduled caste	0	0	0
Scheduled tribe	7	6	1
Literates	271	156	115
Workers (all)	209	132	77
Main workers (total)	193	127	66
Main workers: Cultivators	130	96	34
Main workers: Agricultural labourers	54	27	27
Main workers: Household industry workers	0	0	0
Main workers: Other	9	4	5
Marginal workers (total)	16	5	11
Marginal workers: Cultivators	1	1	0
Marginal workers: Agricultural labourers	14	4	10
Marginal workers: Household industry workers	0	0	0
Marginal workers: Others	1	0	1
Non-workers	378	176	202
