= Umrao Singh (politician) =

Indian politician

Umrao Singh (18 August 1919 – 4 March 1981) was an Indian freedom fighter and political activist from Sehore district, Madhya Pradesh. He served as a Deputy Minister and Cabinet Minister in the former Bhopal state, and a member of the First Cabinet of the state of Madhya Pradesh. He served as an MLA in the 1st, 2nd, 3rd and 5th Vidhan Sabha of the Government of Madhya Pradesh.

== Early life and family ==
Umrao Singh was born in Sehore district, Madhya Pradesh. He was the son of Shri Dariyaav Singh. He finished his formal education till Intermediate Visharad.

He was married to Smt. Tara Devi, and has three daughters and three sons. He later maintained his permanent residence in Bhopal, Madhya Pradesh.

== Political Life and Social Work ==
Umrao Singh was known to be a patriot, public leader and an eloquent speaker. He started participating in political activities of Sehore at a very young age, from 1935. However, his social service, religious and political life began with Arya Samaj.

In 1950, he played an inevitable role in establishing Arya Samaj in the district of Sehore.

During his student life he formed various youth organizations. He led the unions of Bidi workers, Agricultural labourers and Mill workers under National Labour Congress.

He played an active role in the Bhopal Integration Movement by Bhopal Congress between 1948 and 1949. He became the Parshad (Councilor) of Sehore Municipality.

In the First General Election of 1952, he was elected as an MLA from the State Assembly of Sehore, a region of East Bhopal, and took the post of Deputy Minister in the cabinet of then Chief Minister Dr. Shankar Dayal Sharma.

He was a member of Madhya Pradesh State Congress Committee for 22 years and held significant positions. He was a Deputy Minister in the cabinet of former Chief Minister Bhagwant Rao Mandloi in 1963.

He worked as a Deputy Minister, State Minister and Cabinet Minister under Pandit Dwarka Prasad Mishra, Shri Shyama Charan Shukla and Shri Prakash Chandra Sethi till 1977.

Significant achievements during his term include the establishment of Chandra Shekhar Aazad Govt PG College, Sehore, to promote higher education for women, and surrender of Sardar Mohar Singh, Madhav Singh and of their gang of 150 dacoits from Chambal and their rehabilitation in village Morena.

== Political Career after formation of Madhya Pradesh ==
Member of Legislative Assembly (MLA) - (i) First Vidhan Sabha, 1956–1957 (ii) Second Vidhan Sabha, 1957–1962, (iii) Third Vidhan Sabha, 1962–1967 from Sehore assembly constituency of Madhya Pradesh, and (iv) Fifth Vidhan Sabha, 1972–1977 from Ashta assembly constituency of Madhya Pradesh.

=== Ministerial Positions held in Government of Madhya Pradesh ===
(i) State Minister of Cooperatives in 1972 and 1973,

(ii) Deputy Minister of Agriculture in 1972,

(iii) Minister of Tribal Welfare and Scheduled Caste Welfare in 1972 and 1976,

(iv) Minister of Forest in 1973,

(v) State Minister of Forest in 1974 and 1975, and

(vi) Minister of Rehabilitation in 1976.

== Administrative Work ==
Chairman of New Madhya Pradesh Estimates Committee.

President of (i) Bharat Samaj Sevak, 1973, and (ii) Madhya Pradesh Khadi and Village Industries Board.

== Honours ==
In the honour of his 40 years of service, the bus depot in Ashta, Madhya Pradesh was named Umrao Singh Bus Depot after his untimely death in 1981 due to heart attack.

Umrao Singh Ward and Umrao Singh Road, a ward and road in Sehore, were also named in his memory.
