= Shyampur, Madhya Pradesh =

Town in Madhya Pradesh

Coordinates: 23°24′54″N 77°04′56″E

Shyampur is a village and a Tehsil in Sehore District of Madhya Pradesh, India. Shyampur Town had a population of 10,271 of which 5609 are males while 4662 are females per the Census 2011.

It is well known for its Sharbati variety of wheat and soybean. Recent development of interest for Kabli Chana between farmers led to ample production of the product in the area. The proposed Bhopal-Kota railway line will pass through Shyampur, connecting it to major cities of Madhya Pradesh.
