= Rehti =

- City municipality
- Location in Madhya Pradesh, India Rehti (India)
- Coordinates: 22.73°N 77.43°E
- Country: India
- State: Madhya Pradesh
- District: Sehore

Government
  - Type: Democratic
  - Body: Parliamentary

Area
  - Total: 12 km^{2} (4.6 sq mi)
- Elevation: 303 m (994 ft)

Population (2011)
  - Total: 11,611
  - Density: 970/km^{2} (2,500/sq mi)

Languages
  - Official: Hindi
- Time zone: UTC+5:30 (IST)
- PIN: 466446
- ISO 3166 code: IN-MP
- Vehicle registration: MP-37

Rehti is a city municipality in Sehore District in the Indian state of Madhya Pradesh. Rehti is divided into 15 wards for which elections are held every 5 years.

== Geography ==
Rehti is located at 22.73°N 77.43°E. It has an average elevation of 303 metres (994 feet). It is located near Vindhyachal Range and surrounded by mountains. The nearest airport is Bhopal and the nearest railway station is Hoshangabad, 37 km away.

== Demographics ==
The Rehti Nagar Panchayat has population of 11,611 of which 6,062 are males while 5,549 are females as per report released by Census India 2011. Population of children with age of 0-6 is 1,525 which is 13.13% of total population of Rehti (NP). In Rehti Nagar Panchayat, female sex ratio is of 915 against a state average of 931. Child Sex Ratio is around 851 compared to a state average of 918. Literacy rate of Rehti is 80.57% higher than state average of 69.32%. In Rehti, male literacy is around 88.03% while female literacy rate is 72.50%. Rehti Nagar Panchayat has total administration over 2,215 houses to which it supplies basic amenities like water and sewerage. It is also authorized to build roads within Nagar Panchayat limits and impose taxes on properties coming under its jurisdiction.

== Work profile ==
Out of total population, 3,738 were engaged in work or business activity. Of this 3,130 were males while 608 were females. Of total 3,738 working population, 86.76% were engaged in Main Work while 13.24% of total workers were engaged in Marginal Work.

== Access ==
Rehti is 70 km from the capital of Madhya Pradesh Bhopal, there are buses running on a route towards Rehti. Nearest railway station Budhani.

== Attraction ==
Salkanpur Temple is a famous site near Rehti. It is just 5 km from Rehti. The Delawadi Forests are also nearby.
