= Inayatullah Khan (Indian politician) =

Indian politician

Member of the Madhya Pradesh Legislative Assembly
- In office 1957–1967
- Preceded by: New constituency
- Succeeded by: R. Mewada
- Constituency: Sehore

Inayatullah Khan was an Indian politician from the state of the Madhya Pradesh. He represented Sehore Vidhan Sabha constituency in Madhya Pradesh Legislative Assembly by winning General election of 1957.
