= Madhya Pradesh Board of Secondary Education =

Board of school education India

- Logo
- Abbreviation: MPBSE
- Formation: 1965
- Type: Governmental Organization
- Legal status: Foundation
- Headquarters: Bhopal, MP, India
- Location: India
- Official language: Hindi, English & Urdu
- Owner: Department of Education Madhya Pradesh
- Chairman: Smt. SMITA BHARADWAJ IAS
- Secretary: Shri.Krishna Deo Tripathi IAS
- Board of directors: Sheela Dahima, Addl. Secretary; Hridyesh Shrivastav, Dy. Secretary; Gopal Prasad Singh, Joint Dir.Finance; Balwant Verma, Exam Controller; Bhupesh Gupta, Chief Systems Officer; Vijay Guhe, Registrar; Mukesh Kumar Malviya, Registrar
- Main organ: Government of Madhya Pradesh
- Website: official website

Madhya Pradesh Board of Secondary Education (abbreviated MPBSE) is a board of school education in Madhya Pradesh State of India.

The MPBSE is a Madhya Pradesh government body responsible for determining the policy-related, administrative, cognitive, and intellectual direction of the state's higher educational system. The board regulates and supervises the system of Intermediate education in Madhya Pradesh State. It executes and governs various activities that include devising of courses of study, prescribing syllabus, conducting examinations, granting affiliations to colleges. MPBSE also provides direction, support and leadership for all educational institutions under its jurisdiction It also runs model schools such as the Model High, TT Nagar. mp board has announced syllabus deduction up to 40% on 25 sep 2023 for class 12. this includes humanities science and commerce stream for class 10 it would remain the same as per government order

== Establishment ==
The Madhya Pradesh Legislature, in the sixteenth year of the Republic of India, enacted an Act for the establishment of a Board in order to regulate Secondary Education in Madhya Pradesh and other ancillary matters. In 1965 this autonomous body was established under The Madhya Pradesh Secondary Education Act, 1965.

== Activities ==
- To grant affiliation/recognition to schools.
- To prescribe courses and text books at High school and Intermediate level.
- To conduct High school and Intermediations.
- To provide equivalence to the examinations conducted by other Boards.

== Academics ==
The MPBSE prescribes the syllabus, for students from Standard IX to Standard XII, for schools affiliated with it & exams whose scores are necessary to gain admission in higher study institutes.

- Bengali, Oriya, Punjabi, Kannada, Malayalam, Tamil, Telugu, Gujarati, Marathi, Sanskrit, Sindhi, Urdu, Arabic, French, Russian or Persian, can be chosen as a language subject in addition to the compulsory English language and Hindi languages.

== Examination ==
It conducts three board examinations: the Middle School Exam for Standard VIII, High School Certificate Examination for standard X and the Higher Secondary (School) Certificate (HSC) Exam for standard XII, which is a school-leaving examination.

== See also ==
- Central Board of Secondary Education (CBSE), India
- National Institute of Open Schooling (NIOS), India
- Indian Certificate of Secondary Education (ICSE), India
- Indian School Certificate (ISC), India
- Council for the Indian School Certificate Examinations (CISCE), India
- Secondary School Leaving Certificate (SSLC), India
