= Model Higher Secondary School, TT Nagar, Bhopal =

Model Higher Secondary School
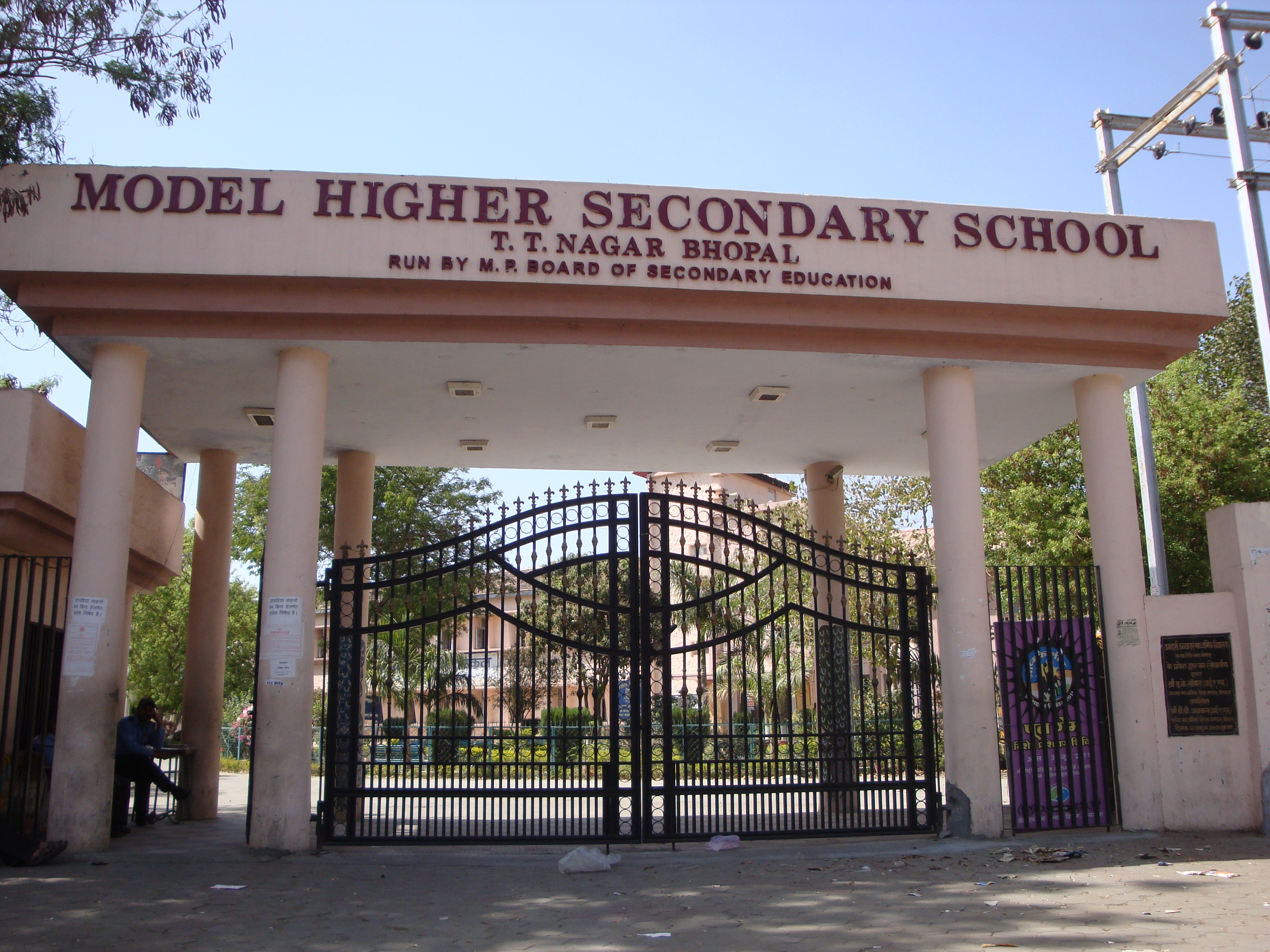
- Main entrance of the Model HS School

Location
- South TT Nagar; Bhopal, Madhya Pradesh, 462003; India; 23.231507°N 77.396382°E

Information
- Motto: तमसो मा ज्योतिर्गमय; Tamaso maa jyotir-gamaya (Sanskrit) (Lead me from Darkness to Light)
- Established: 1960
- School board: Madhya Pradesh Board of Secondary Education
- President: Lucky Shukla
- Principal: Rekha Sharma
- Faculty: Smt. Neeta kanhai (senior faculty) Shree Gajendra Kumar (Best physics faculty) Smt. Ritu saxena( Quick meth)
- Key people: Vishwas Sarang
- Grades: VI-XII
- Gender: Co ed
- Language: English and Hindi
- Campus size: 49 Acres, Urban
- Houses: Shubhas Chandra Bose(Red), APJ Abdul Kalam(Blue), Vivekanand(Yellow), Raja Bhoj(Green)
- Publication: Model Publishers
- Newspaper: Today Times Magazines
- Yearbook: 2019
- Affiliations: Board of Secondary Education, Madhya Pradesh
- Website: modelschoolttnbhopal.com

The Model Higher Secondary School is a co-ed school run by the Madhya Pradesh Board of Secondary Education in Bhopal, India.

== History ==
The Model HS School was established in 1960. It was brought under the administration of the Madhya Pradesh Board of Secondary Education in 1964.

Model High has been a center of student politics in Bhopal since its early years. Shivraj Singh Chouhan, the Chief Minister of Madhya Pradesh, was the president of the school's students union in the 1970s. In 2009, while protesting against Rahul Gandhi's comments on serial blasts in Mumbai, the Bharatiya Janata Party (BJP) activists came to Model school and purchased an admission form for him. They requested the school to impart him "primary education" so he would not make "immature comments".

== Campus ==
The school's campus is located in the South Tatya Tope Nagar, near the Jawahar Chowk City Bus Station. It has a large playground located along the Bhadbhada Road. Some of the junior teams representing the Bhopal District are trained here. The TT Nagar Sport Complex is also located near the school.

The campus hosts several state-level events. On 15 November 2010, the former President of India, A. P. J. Abdul Kalam visited the school to inaugurate the INSPIRE Award science exhibition. In 2012, the school auditorium, along with Gandhi Bhavan and Marshal Arts Hall in TT Nagar Stadium, hosted the 17th State Youth Festival.

== Academics ==
The school offers classes in English and Hindi mediums of instruction. It has classes from Standard I to XII. The streams offered at the higher level include Science, Arts, Commerce and Vocational. Merit scholarship programs are offered to students at all the levels. The students belonging to the scheduled castes and scheduled tribes are offered fee concessions.

The school is a major evaluation center for the answer sheets of the High School and Higher Secondary Board exams in Madhya Pradesh. In 2012, about 750 teachers evaluated nearly 300,000 answer sheets at the school.

== Notable alumni ==
- Shivraj Singh Chouhan aka mama, Chief Minister of Madhya Pradesh, was elected the president of the school's Students Union in 1975.
