= Ladli Laxmi Yojana =

Government programme in Madhya Pradesh, India

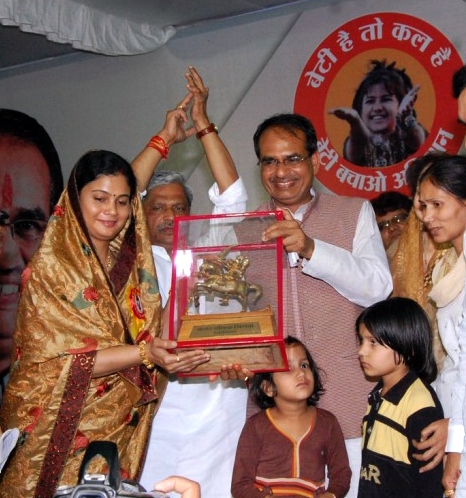
Gwalior Mayor Sameeksha Gupta and Shivraj Singh Chouhan at Ladli Laxmi Yojana event

Ladli Laxmi Yojana is a scheme introduced by Government of Madhya Pradesh. It was inaugurated by Chief Minister Shivraj Singh Chouhan on 2 May 2007, which was followed by expansion to six additional states including Uttar Pradesh, Bihar, Delhi, Chhattisgarh, Jharkhand and Goa. It came into effect from 1 April 2007.

The scheme lays a lot of emphasis on providing a good substructure for the economic and educational status of the families adopting this and suppress female infanticide. Its underlying goal includes bringing about a positive change in the mindset of conservative Indian families about the birth and upbringing of the girl child.

Under this scheme, the state government would have to purchase National Saving Certificates, worth ₹6,000 each year for five years and these would be renewed from time to time. At the time of girl's admission in the sixth standard, ₹2,000 and on admission in the ninth standard ₹4,000 would be paid to the girl. When she gets admitted to the 11th standard she would receive ₹7,500. During her higher secondary education, she would get ₹200 every month. On completion of 21 years, she would receive the remaining amount, which would be approximately ₹1 lakh.

The scheme focuses on providing benefits to girl children, mainly from non-tax-paying families or orphans, who were born on or after 1 January 2006.

== Focus of the scheme ==
The scheme focuses on creating a positive attitude towards the birth, health and education of the girl child.

- The scheme aims at providing monetary assistance to girl children in order to empower girls.
- Under this scheme, the girl child's educational expenses would be funded in order to support the respective families. But the same would not be applicable to a child who drops out of school, under this scheme.
- The objective of the government is to create a balance in the demographic profile of the country and to provide women with a conducive environment for all rounder growth.

== Implementation of the scheme ==
Division of women and children improvement is responsible to implement the plan; the same has been propelled for all regions of the state. Essentially this Scheme was actualized for the span of one year under which is March 2008. The base of the effect examination was just April 2007 to December 2007. During this examination it was found that in the Seoni area absolute 975 recipients joined the plan in the time of April 2007 to Dec. 2007 and out of 975 recipients 391 recipients have been gotten NSC [National Saving Certificate].

=== Intensive steps by the administration ===
- Visiting Guiding, and assessing the plan by the district collector consistently.
- A special Gram Sabha is organised in all the Panchayats to make the public mindful of the Ladli Laxmi Scheme on the birth commemoration of Maharani Laxmi bai.
- Organizing mindfulness camps in Seoni District and appropriating the NSC declaration to the recipients with the help of the welfare department.
- Publicizing through leaflets, banners and pieces of literature.
- Regular month to month examination to stamp the advancement of the plan and to accomplish its objective.
- Making the Janpat Panchayat individuals mindful of the plan during their gathering and speaking to them to incorporate however many recipients as would be prudent.

== Prerequisites for the scheme ==
- The scheme is provided only for natives of Madhya Pradesh who are not paying any taxes to the Government of India. In case the family's status changes to a tax-paying family amidst this scheme, it would still be applicable for the child.
- The scheme is applicable only to the first two girl children in the family. In the case of twins, a third girl child's education would also be funded. If a family adopts a girl child, her education is also eligible to be funded.
- The child must be enrolled in an Aaganwadi centre.
- The gross amount of ₹1 lakh would only be given to the family of the child if they do not get married before the age of 18 years.
- A child who drops out of school under this scheme would no longer be eligible for monetary funding for their educational expenses.
- The scheme is only provided to families under the poverty line.
- An official certificate of adoption for an orphan child is mandatory in order for her to be eligible for this scheme.

== Progress in the Yojana ==
The State Minister, Maya Singh, reported that over 20 lakh girl children in Madhya Pradesh had benefited from the scheme as of 14 May 2015. She also said, "In 2006 Mahila Panchayat, a total of 14 announcements, including that of 'Ladli Laxmi scheme' which is aimed at, among other things, bridging the skewed sex ratio, were made and all of them now stand fulfilled." The aim of creating better educational opportunities and bringing about a change in the orthodox mindset of families below the poverty line has been successful so far.

Dissecting the impact at different levels, the point that came to see is that each body wants this plan to proceed in future. On the chance that the Scheme moves with its Performa of execution then this will change the discrimination met by the young women in the society and will guarantee a hopeful future. In spite of the inclination that the girl child is a burden to the family, women will come up as the head and equivalents to other individual family members.

The Scheme will establish young girls in the point of view of the society and family and they would get the absolute advantage of the Scheme, which will assist them in developing their character and conquering any possible future prospects. Other than a decrease in girl infanticide, issues of the household viciousness against them will diminish and these issues will be gradually disposed off from society. In 2023, the government of Madhya Pradesh launched Ladli Behna Yojana to further empower women of Madhya pradesh. Under this scheme the government will transfer Rs 1000/- per month to every women of Madhya pradesh.

== Summary ==
Ladli Laxmi Yojana has aimed at securing the lives of many girls and providing them with the opportunity of educating themselves and expanding their horizons. The scheme aims at providing monetary assistance to families below the poverty line and adopted orphans to finance the educational expenses for eligible girl children. It has proven to be useful to educate over 20 lakh girls and improve the attitude of society towards girl children. The scheme, first started in Madhya Pradesh has spread its wings over 6 other states and has helped set the foundation in the lives of many girls.

The structure of the scheme remains highly organised and the members are constantly working towards gathering more recognition and improvisation for the same.

== Ladli Lakshmi Yojana Benefits ==
At the time of registration, the government issues an assurance certificate in the girl's name for ₹1,43,000. Every year, ₹6,000 is deposited into the girl's account for five years. Upon admission to grade 6, ₹2,000 is given, ₹4,000 is provided in grade 9, and amounts of ₹6,000 each are granted in grades 11 and 12. On admission to a recognized college or a minimum two-year vocational course, the girl receives an incentive amount of ₹25,000 in the first and final years. When the girl reaches the age of 21, she is awarded the remaining amount of ₹1,00,000.
