= Jawar, Sehore =

Town in Madhya Pradesh, India

Jawar
- Town
- Location in Madhya Pradesh, India
- Coordinates: 23.00°N 76.50°E
- Country: India
- State: Madhya Pradesh
- District: Sehore District

Government
  - Type: Nagar panchayat

Population (2011)
  - Total: 8,206

Languages
  - Official: Hindi
- PIN: 466221
- Vehicle registration: MP 37

Jawar is a nagar panchayat and a town in Sehore District of Madhya Pradesh, India. It is also a tehsil.

== Geography ==
Jawar is located at 23.00°N 76.50°E. It has an average elevation of 303 metres (994 feet). Newaj River Flows In town.It is located near Vindhyachal Range and surrounded by mountains.

== Demographics ==
Jawar Nagar Panchayat has population of 8,206 of which 4,182 are males while 4,024 are females as Census India 2011.

== Civil Administration ==
Jawar is a Nagar Panchayat city is divided into 15 wards for which elections are held every 5 years.Jawar Nagar Panchayat has total administration over 1,502 houses to which it supplies basic amenities like water and sewerage. It is also authorize to build roads within Nagar Panchayat limits and impose taxes on properties coming under its jurisdiction.

== Transportation ==
Jawar is well connected with roads. Sehore is 70 km away from jawar. Roads connected it from other city of district.

Nearest Airport is Bhopal Airport.
