= Sehore Assembly constituency =

Constituency of the Madhya Pradesh legislative assembly in India

Coordinates: 23.206°N 77.082°E

Sehore
- Constituency No. 159 for the Madhya Pradesh Legislative Assembly

Constituency details
- Country: India
- Region: Central India
- State: Madhya Pradesh
- District: Sehore
- Lok Sabha constituency: Bhopal
- Established: 1957
- Total electors: 2,21,644
- Reservation: None

Member of Legislative Assembly
- 16th Madhya Pradesh Legislative Assembly
- Incumbent Sudesh Rai
- Party: Bharatiya Janata Party
- Alliance: NDA
- Elected year: 2023
- Preceded by: Ramesh Saxena

Sehore Assembly constituency is one of the 230 assembly constituencies of Madhya Pradesh and is numbered 159 within the state's legislative framework. It lies entirely within Sehore district and forms a segment of the Bhopal Lok Sabha constituency. The seat is currently held by Sudesh Rai of the Bharatiya Janata Party, who has represented it since 2013, serving his third consecutive term.

== History of the constituency ==
=== Pre-independence and Bhopal state era ===
Before India's independence, the area now covered by Sehore constituency was part of the Bhopal State, a princely state ruled by a Muslim dynasty. The Bhopal Legislative Assembly, formed after the state's accession to India in 1949, included two members from Sehore: Umrao Singh and Sultan Muhammad Khan, who were elected in the 1952 election as Indian National Congress candidates. That short-lived assembly was dissolved when Bhopal state merged into Madhya Pradesh in 1956.

=== After the formation of Madhya Pradesh (1957 onward) ===
The present Sehore constituency came into existence in 1957 as a single-member seat following the States Reorganisation Act. It has remained a general (unreserved) constituency ever since. Over the decades, it has been a battleground between the Indian National Congress and the Bharatiya Janata Party (earlier the Bharatiya Jan Sangh), with occasional victories by the Janata Party and independents.

== Electoral history and trends ==
Sehore has witnessed a series of intensely contested elections. In the initial years after the formation of Madhya Pradesh, the Congress held sway. Umrao Singh, a veteran freedom fighter and a prominent local leader, won the seat in 1957, though the election was a double-member constituency for that one cycle, and he was accompanied by Inayatullah Khan. From 1962 onward it reverted to a single-member constituency, and Inayatullah Khan retained it for the Congress.

The rise of the Bharatiya Jana Sangh in the late 1960s began to erode Congress dominance. In 1967, R. Mewada of the Jan Sangh defeated the sitting Congress member, signalling a shift in voter preference. Congress briefly regained the seat in 1972 when Aziz Qureshi, who would later become the Governor of Uttarakhand, won. The post-Emergency wave of 1977 brought the Janata Party to power, and Savita Bajpai captured Sehore, only to lose it in 1980 to Sunder Lal Patwa of the newly formed Bharatiya Janata Party. Patwa, who would later become the Chief Minister of Madhya Pradesh, began a pattern of BJP strength in the constituency.

The seat changed hands between Congress and BJP throughout the 1980s and 1990s. In 1993, a significant turning point occurred when Ramesh Saxena, a local strongman, contested as an independent and defeated both major party candidates, securing 50.91% of the vote. Saxena subsequently joined the BJP and won three more consecutive elections from 1998 to 2008, establishing a personal hold over the constituency that transcended party affiliations. His tenure was marked by a focus on irrigation projects and road connectivity.

In 2013, however, the political landscape shifted dramatically. Usha Ramesh Saxena, wife of ramesh saxena contested on the BJP ticket. Against her, Sudesh Rai, a former associate of the Saxena family, ran as an independent and won by a narrow margin of 1,626 votes. Rai's victory was widely seen as a rebellion within the local BJP unit and demonstrated the enduring power of personality politics in Sehore.

Rai joined the BJP before the 2018 election and successfully retained the seat on the party's ticket, though his victory margin was a modest 13.05% in a multi-cornered contest that saw four serious candidates. In 2023, benefitting from a strong BJP wave across Madhya Pradesh, Rai recorded a massive victory with 58.40% of the vote and a margin of nearly 38,000 votes, cementing his position as the undisputed leader of the constituency.

== Members of Legislative Assembly ==
=== Bhopal Legislative Assembly ===
| Election | Name | Party |
|---|---|---|
| 1952 | Umrao Singh | Indian National Congress |
| 1952 | Sultan Muhammad Khan | Indian National Congress |

=== Madhya Pradesh Legislative Assembly ===
| Year | Member | Party |
|---|---|---|
| 1957 | Umrao Singh | Indian National Congress |
| 1957 | Inayatullah Khan | Indian National Congress |
| 1962 | Inayatullah Khan | Indian National Congress |
| 1967 | R. Mewada | Bharatiya Jan Sangh |
| 1972 | Aziz Qureshi | Indian National Congress |
| 1977 | Savita Bajpai | Janata Party |
| 1980 | Sunder Lal Patwa | Bharatiya Janata Party |
| 1985 | Shankar Lal | Indian National Congress |
| 1990 | Madan Lal Tyagi | Bharatiya Janata Party |
| 1993 | Ramesh Saxena | Independent |
| 1998 | Ramesh Saxena | Bharatiya Janata Party |
| 2003 | Ramesh Saxena | Bharatiya Janata Party |
| 2008 | Ramesh Saxena | Bharatiya Janata Party |
| 2013 | Sudesh Rai | Independent |
| 2018 | Sudesh Rai | Bharatiya Janata Party |
| 2023 | Sudesh Rai | Bharatiya Janata Party |

== Election results ==
Vote share of winning candidates
| 2023 | 58.40% |
| 2018 | 38.00% |
| 2013 | 44.47% |
| 2008 | 42.15% |
| 2003 | 49.49% |
| 1998 | 56.79% |
| 1993 | 50.91% |

=== 2023 ===
2023 Madhya Pradesh Legislative Assembly election: Sehore
| Party | Candidate | Votes | % | ±% |
|---|---|---|---|---|
| BJP | Sudesh Rai | 105,997 | 58.4 | ▲20.4 |
| INC | Shashank Ramesh Saxena | 68,146 | 37.55 | ▲12.6 |
| BSP | Kamlesh Dohare | 4,103 | 2.26 | ▲1.46 |
| NOTA | None of the above | 917 | 0.51 | ▼0.21 |
| Majority | | 37,851 | 20.85 | ▲7.8 |
| Turnout | | 181,501 | 81.89 | ▲0.69 |
| BJP hold | | Swing | | |

=== 2018 ===
2018 Madhya Pradesh Legislative Assembly election: Sehore
| Party | Candidate | Votes | % | ±% |
|---|---|---|---|---|
| BJP | Sudesh Rai | 60,117 | 38.0 | |
| INC | Surendra Singh Thakur | 39,473 | 24.95 | |
| Independent | Usha Ramesh Saxena | 26,397 | 16.69 | |
| Independent | Gaurav "Sunny" Mahajan | 25,916 | 16.38 | |
| NOTA | None of the above | 1,140 | 0.72 | |
| Majority | | 20,644 | 13.05 | |
| Turnout | | 158,187 | 81.2 | |
| BJP gain from Independent | | Swing | | |

=== 2013 ===
2013 Madhya Pradesh Legislative Assembly election: Sehore
| Party | Candidate | Votes | % | ±% |
|---|---|---|---|---|
| Independent | Sudesh Rai | 63,604 | 44.47 | |
| BJP | Usha Ramesh Saxena | 61,978 | 43.34 | |
| INC | Harish Rathore | 9,244 | 6.46 | |
| BSP | Anokhi Verma | 755 | 0.53 | |
| NOTA | None of the above | 2,379 | 1.66 | |
| Majority | | 1,626 | 1.18 | −− |
| Turnout | | 137,960 | | −− |
| Independent gain from BJP | | Swing | | |

=== 2008 ===
2008 Madhya Pradesh Legislative Assembly election: Sehore
| Party | Candidate | Votes | % | ±% |
|---|---|---|---|---|
| BJP | Ramesh Saxena | 43,404 | 42.15 | |
| INC | Swadash Rai | 33,368 | 32.40 | |
| Bharatiya Janshakti Party | Gourav Mahajan (Sunny) | 19,776 | 19.20 | |
| BSP | K. K. Gupta | 901 | 0.87 | |
| Majority | | 10,036 | 9.75 | −− |
| Turnout | | | 69.7 | −− |
| BJP hold | | Swing | | |

=== 2003 ===
2003 Madhya Pradesh Legislative Assembly election: Sehore
| Party | Candidate | Votes | % | ±% |
|---|---|---|---|---|
| BJP | Ramesh Saxena | 52,681 | 49.49 | |
| INC | Surendra Singh Thakur | 41,670 | 39.14 | |
| Independent | Jaspal Ajit Singh Arora | 4,613 | 4.33 | |
| BSP | Sunita Sharma | 2,349 | 2.21 | |
| NCP | Noshad Khan | 1,524 | 1.43 | |
| Independent | Payal Jan | 1,498 | 1.41 | |
| SP | Arif Ali | 902 | 0.85 | |
| Majority | | 11,011 | 10.35 | −− |
| Turnout | | 106,455 | 72.70 | −− |
| BJP hold | | Swing | | |

=== 1998 ===
1998 Madhya Pradesh Legislative Assembly election: Sehore
| Party | Candidate | Votes | % | ±% |
|---|---|---|---|---|
| BJP | Ramesh Saxena | 46,171 | 56.79 | |
| INC | Jaspal Singh Arora | 32,883 | 40.45 | |
| SS | Jashrath Dhangar | 1,058 | 1.30 | |
| ABHM | Pt. Radheyshyam Vashishtha | 809 | 1.00 | |
| Independent | Kutubuddin Sheikh | 228 | 0.28 | |
| Independent | Devendra Kumar | 149 | 0.18 | |
| Majority | | 13,288 | 16.34 | |
| Turnout | | 81,298 | 70.80 | |
| BJP hold | | Swing | | |

=== 1993 ===
1993 Madhya Pradesh Legislative Assembly election: Sehore
| Party | Candidate | Votes | % | ±% |
|---|---|---|---|---|
| Independent | Ramesh Saxena | 39,182 | 50.91 | |
| BJP | Madan Lal Tyagi | 25,826 | 33.56 | |
| INC | Shankar Lal Sabu | 10,083 | 13.10 | |
| Independent | Vimal Kumar | 732 | 0.95 | |
| Independent | Sewa Yadav | 422 | 0.55 | |
| Democratic Dal Party | Sakun Bai | 415 | 0.54 | |
| BSP | Ajij Khan | 300 | 0.39 | |
| Majority | | 13,356 | 17.35 | |
| Turnout | | 78,731 | 69.52 | |
| Independent gain from BJP | | Swing | | |
