= Rehti tehsil =

- Tehsil
- Location in Madhya Pradesh Rehti tehsil (India)
- Coordinates: 22.73°N 77.43°E
- Country: India
- State: Madhya Pradesh
- District: Sehore district

Government
  - Type: Janpad Panchayat
  - Body: Council

Languages
  - Official: Hindi
- Time zone: UTC+5:30 (IST)
- ISO 3166 code: MP-IN

Rehti tehsil is a tehsil in Sehore district, Madhya Pradesh, India. It is also a subdivision of the administrative and revenue division of bhopal district of Madhya Pradesh.
