= Babadiya Khurd =

- Village
- Location within Madhya Pradesh Location within India
- Coordinates: 23.1939261°N 77.5368628°E
- Country: India
- State: Madhya Pradesh
- District: Bhopal
- Tehsil: Huzur
- Elevation: 452 m (1,483 ft)

Population (2011)
  - Total: 574
- Time zone: UTC+5:30 (IST)
- ISO 3166 code: MP-IN
- 2011 census code: 482447

Babadiya Khurd is a village in the Bhopal district of Madhya Pradesh, India. It is located in the Huzur tehsil and the Phanda block.

== Demographics ==
According to the 2011 census of India, Babadiya Khurd has 111 households. The effective literacy rate (i.e. the literacy rate of population excluding children aged 6 and below) is 69.38%.

Demographics (2011 Census)
	Total	Male	Female
Population	574	319	255
Children aged below 6 years	94	63	31
Scheduled caste	75	35	40
Scheduled tribe	13	8	5
Literates	333	199	134
Workers (all)	188	151	37
Main workers (total)	187	150	37
Main workers: Cultivators	76	74	2
Main workers: Agricultural labourers	84	56	28
Main workers: Household industry workers	3	2	1
Main workers: Other	24	18	6
Marginal workers (total)	1	1	0
Marginal workers: Cultivators	1	1	0
Marginal workers: Agricultural labourers	0	0	0
Marginal workers: Household industry workers	0	0	0
Marginal workers: Others	0	0	0
Non-workers	386	168	218
