= Kirar =

Hindu caste

Kirar is a Hindu caste of cultivators. They are categorized as an Other Backward Class (OBC) by the Government of India.

== Notable people ==
- Shivraj Singh Chouhan, former Chief Minister of Madhya Pradesh
- Thakur Malkhan Singh, former Uttar Pradesh Cabinet Minister
