= Bijasan Mata Temple, Salkanpur =

Temple in Salkanpur

Bijasan Mata Mandir Salkanpur
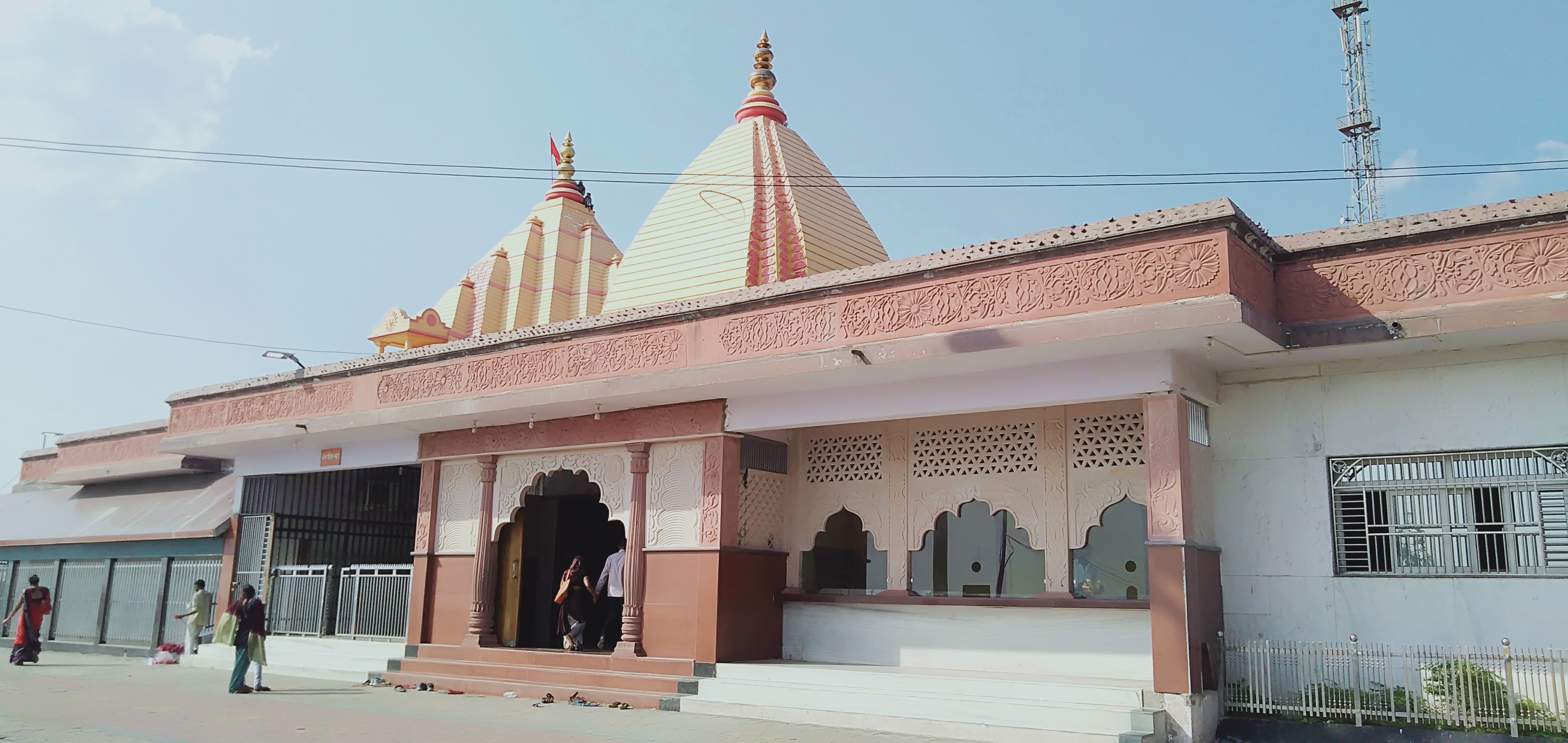

- Location in Madhya Pradesh

Religion
- Affiliation: Hinduism
- District: Salkanpur is a village panchayat located in the Sehore district of Madhya Pradesh state, India.
- Deity: Durga
- Festival: Navaratri

Location
- Location: Salkanpur Rehti
- State: Madhya Pradesh
- Country: India
- Interactive map of Bijasan Mata Mandir Salkanpur
- Coordinates: 22°44′43″N 77°28′48″E

Website
- https://sehore.nic.in/en/tourist-place/salkanpur-durga-temple/

Vindhyawasini Mata Temple Salkanpur is a sacred Siddhpeeth of Vindhyavasni Beejasan Devi (one of the incarnations of the Hindu goddess “Durga”), located on an 800-foot summit in the village of Salkanpur, near Rehti, India. The stairs of the summit feature are around 1400.

Salkanpur is located 70 km from Bhopal, the capital of Madhya Pradesh. This temple is considered one of the holiest temples for Hindus in India.
