= Hinoti Sadak =

- village
- Location within Madhya Pradesh Location within India
- Coordinates: 23.4901857°N 77.4099497°E
- Country: India
- State: Madhya Pradesh
- District: Bhopal
- Tehsil: Berasia
- Elevation: 473 m (1,552 ft)

Population (2011)
  - Total: 1,632
- Time zone: UTC+5:30 (IST)
- ISO 3166 code: MP-IN
- 2011 census code: 482301

Hinoti Sadak is a village in the Bhopal district of Madhya Pradesh, India. It is located in the Berasia tehsil.

== Demographics ==
According to the 2011 census of India, Hinoti Sadak has 325 households. The effective literacy rate (i.e. the literacy rate of population excluding children aged 6 and below) is 73.81%.

Demographics (2011 Census)
	Total	Male	Female
Population	1632	842	790
Children aged below 6 years	208	113	95
Scheduled caste	345	175	170
Scheduled tribe	55	28	27
Literates	1051	592	459
Workers (all)	658	437	221
Main workers (total)	388	330	58
Main workers: Cultivators	150	129	21
Main workers: Agricultural labourers	116	98	18
Main workers: Household industry workers	1	1	0
Main workers: Other	121	102	19
Marginal workers (total)	270	107	163
Marginal workers: Cultivators	106	42	64
Marginal workers: Agricultural labourers	154	58	96
Marginal workers: Household industry workers	0	0	0
Marginal workers: Others	10	7	3
Non-workers	974	405	569
