= Sudesh Rai =

Indian politician

Member of the Madhya Pradesh Legislative Assembly
- Incumbent
- Assumed office 2013
- Preceded by: Ramesh Saxena
- Constituency: Sehore

Personal details
- Party: Bharatiya Janata Party
- Profession: Politician, Businessman

Sudesh Rai is an Indian politician from Madhya Pradesh. He is a three time elected Member of the Madhya Pradesh Legislative Assembly from 2013, 2018, and 2023, representing Sehore Assembly constituency as a Member of the Bharatiya Janata Party.

== Electoral Performance ==
Madhya Pradesh Legislative Assembly

Year	Constituency	Party	Votes	Votes in %	Opponent	Opponent party	Votes	Votes in %	Margin	Margin in %	Result
2013	Sehore	IND	63,604	44.47%	Usha Ramesh Saxena	BJP	61,978	43.34%	1,626	2.55%	Won
2018	Sehore	BJP	60,117	38.00	Surendra Singh Thakur	INC	39,473	24.95%	20,644	13.05%	Won
2023	Sehore	BJP	1,05,997	58.40%	Shashank Ramesh Saxena	INC	68,146	37.55%	37,851	20.85%	Won

== See also ==
- List of chief ministers of Madhya Pradesh
- Madhya Pradesh Legislative Assembly
