= Jetpura =

- village
- Location within Madhya Pradesh Location within India
- Coordinates: 23.4482974°N 77.3984704°E
- Country: India
- State: Madhya Pradesh
- District: Bhopal
- Tehsil: Berasia
- Elevation: 481 m (1,578 ft)

Population (2011)
  - Total: 838
- Time zone: UTC+5:30 (IST)
- ISO 3166 code: IN-MP
- 2011 census code: 482305

Jetpura is a village in the Bhopal district of Madhya Pradesh, India. It is located in the Berasia tehsil.

== Demographics ==
According to the 2011 census of India, Jetpura has 160 households. The effective literacy rate (i.e. the literacy rate of population excluding children aged 6 and below) is 72.47%.

Demographics (2011 Census)
	Total	Male	Female
Population	838	450	388
Children aged below 6 years	137	71	66
Scheduled caste	201	105	96
Scheduled tribe	46	24	22
Literates	508	318	190
Workers (all)	491	267	224
Main workers (total)	262	204	58
Main workers: Cultivators	138	109	29
Main workers: Agricultural labourers	91	74	17
Main workers: Household industry workers	0	0	0
Main workers: Other	33	21	12
Marginal workers (total)	229	63	166
Marginal workers: Cultivators	152	44	108
Marginal workers: Agricultural labourers	75	19	56
Marginal workers: Household industry workers	0	0	0
Marginal workers: Others	2	0	2
Non-workers	347	183	164
