= Shivraj Singh Chouhan =

Indian politician (born 1999)

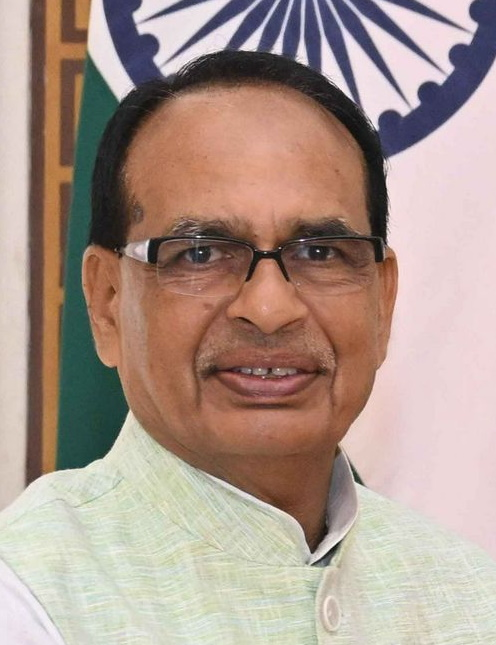
- Official portrait, 2024

Union Minister of Agriculture and Farmers' Welfare
- Incumbent
- Assumed office 9 June 2024
- President: Droupadi Murmu
- Prime Minister: Narendra Modi
- Preceded by: Arjun Munda

Union Minister of Rural Development
- Incumbent
- Assumed office 9 June 2024
- President: Droupadi Murmu
- Prime Minister: Narendra Modi
- Preceded by: Giriraj Singh

Member of Parliament, Lok Sabha
- Incumbent
- Assumed office 4 June 2024
- Preceded by: Ramakant Bhargava
- Constituency: Vidisha, Madhya Pradesh
- In office 19 June 1991 – 28 November 2005
- Preceded by: Atal Bihari Vajpayee
- Succeeded by: Rampal Singh
- Constituency: Vidisha, Madhya Pradesh

17th Chief Minister of Madhya Pradesh
- In office 23 March 2020 – 12 December 2023
- Governor: Lalji Tandon; Anandiben Patel (additional charge); Mangubhai C. Patel
- Preceded by: Kamal Nath
- Succeeded by: Mohan Yadav
- In office 29 November 2005 – 12 December 2018
- Governor: Balram Jakhar; Rameshwar Thakur; Ram Naresh Yadav; Om Prakash Kohli (additional charge)
- Preceded by: Babulal Gaur
- Succeeded by: Kamal Nath

Member of Madhya Pradesh Legislative Assembly
- In office 2006 – 2024
- Preceded by: Rajendra Singh
- Succeeded by: Ramakant Bhargava
- Constituency: Budhni
- In office 1990 – 1991
- Preceded by: Chauhan Singh
- Succeeded by: Mohan Lal Shishir
- Constituency: Budhni

National Vice President of Bharatiya Janata Party
- In office 11 January 2019 – 26 September 2020
- President: J. P. Nadda

President of Bharatiya Janata Yuva Morcha
- In office 2000 – 2002
- Preceded by: Ramashish Rai
- Succeeded by: G. Kishan Reddy

Personal details
- Born: 5 March 1959 (age 67) Jait, Madhya Pradesh, India
- Party: Bharatiya Janata Party
- Spouse: Sadhna Singh Chouhan (m. 1992)
- Children: 2
- Education: Barkatullah University (M.A Philosophy)
- Profession: Agriculturist
- Website: shivrajsinghchouhan.co.in
- Nickname: Mama (meaning: Maternal Uncle in English)

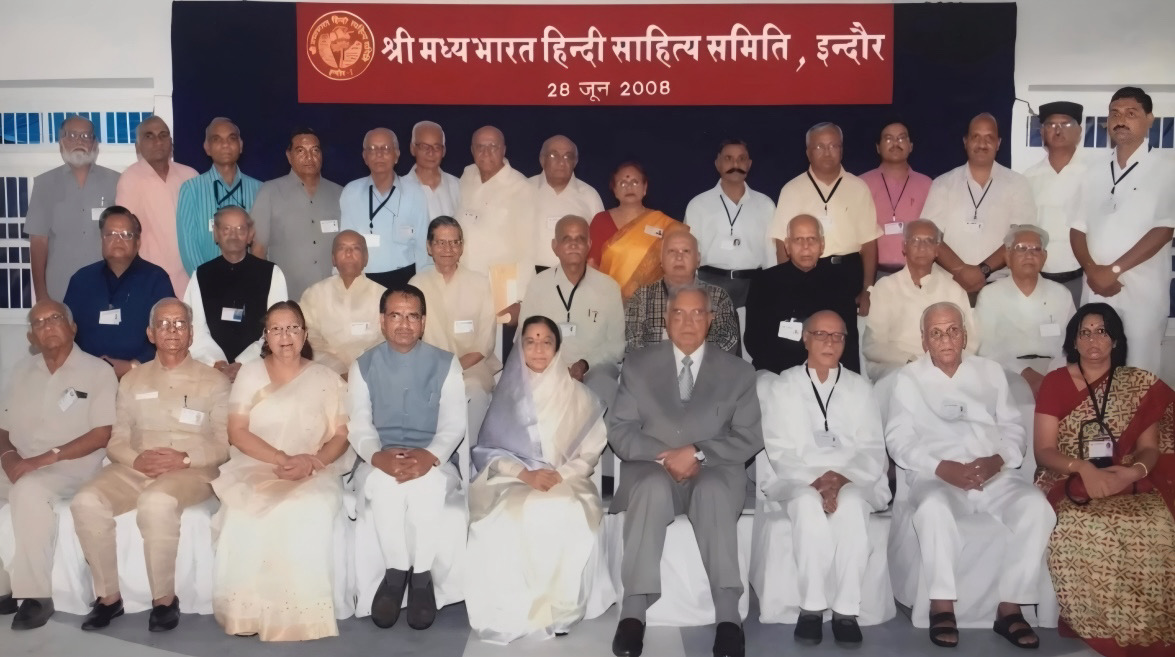
President Pratibha Patil, Governor Balram Jakhar, Chief Minister Chouhan, Narayan Prasad Shukla and Indore MP Sumitra Mahajan at the centenary (100th anniversary) celebrations of the Shri Madhyabharat Hindi Sahitya Samiti on 29 July 2010

Shivraj Singh Chouhan (also spelt Chauhan; Hindi pronunciation: [ʃɪʋ.ɾaːd͡ʒ sɪŋɡʱ t͡ʃɔːɦaːn̪]; born 5 March 1959) is an Indian politician who is serving as the 32nd Minister of Agriculture and Farmers' Welfare and 23rd Minister of Rural Development since 2024. Chouhan served as the Chief Minister of Madhya Pradesh from 2005 to 2018 and again from 2020 to 2023, and was a member of the Madhya Pradesh Legislative Assembly from Budhni from 2006 to 2024, and earlier from 1990 to 1991. He is the longest-serving Chief Minister of Madhya Pradesh.

He served as the Vice President of the Bharatiya Janata Party from 2019 to 2020, and has been a member of the party's Parliamentary Board and Central Election Committee. He was the National President of the Bharatiya Janata Yuva Morcha from 2000 to 2002. Chouhan represented the Vidisha Lok Sabha constituency in the Lok Sabha from 1991 to 2005, and was again elected to the 18th Lok Sabha from the same constituency. Within the BJP, he has also served as General Secretary and President of the party’s Madhya Pradesh state unit.

Chouhan joined the Rashtriya Swayamsevak Sangh in 1972, at the age of 13.

He is known for launching various welfare schemes such as rice at ₹1 per kg for the poor, the Sambal scheme providing maternity assistance to women labourers, free education for underprivileged girls, subsidised electricity, the Ladli Laxmi Yojana, and the Beti Bachao Abhiyan. These welfare initiatives introduced by Chouhan are credited with contributing to the BJP's electoral victories in the 2008, 2013, and 2023 state elections.

== Early life and education ==
Shivraj Singh Chouhan was born in a farmer's family to Prem Singh Chouhan and his wife Sundar Bai Chouhan in the Jait village of Sehore district, and belongs to the Kirar community. He is a gold medalist in M. A. (Philosophy) from Barkatullah University Bhopal.

== Early political career ==
His early political career can be defined as up to the point of his first election to the Lok Sabha. He was elected President of the Model School Students Union in 1975. From 1976 to 1977, he participated in underground movement against the Emergency and was imprisoned in Bhopal Jail for some time.

In his early political career, he has also been:

- A convener of Akhil Bhartiya Keshariya Vahini from 1991 to 1992
- From 1993 to 1996 he was a Member of Committee on Labour and Welfare
- From 1994 to 2000 he was a Member of Hindi Salahkar Samiti

== Political career ==
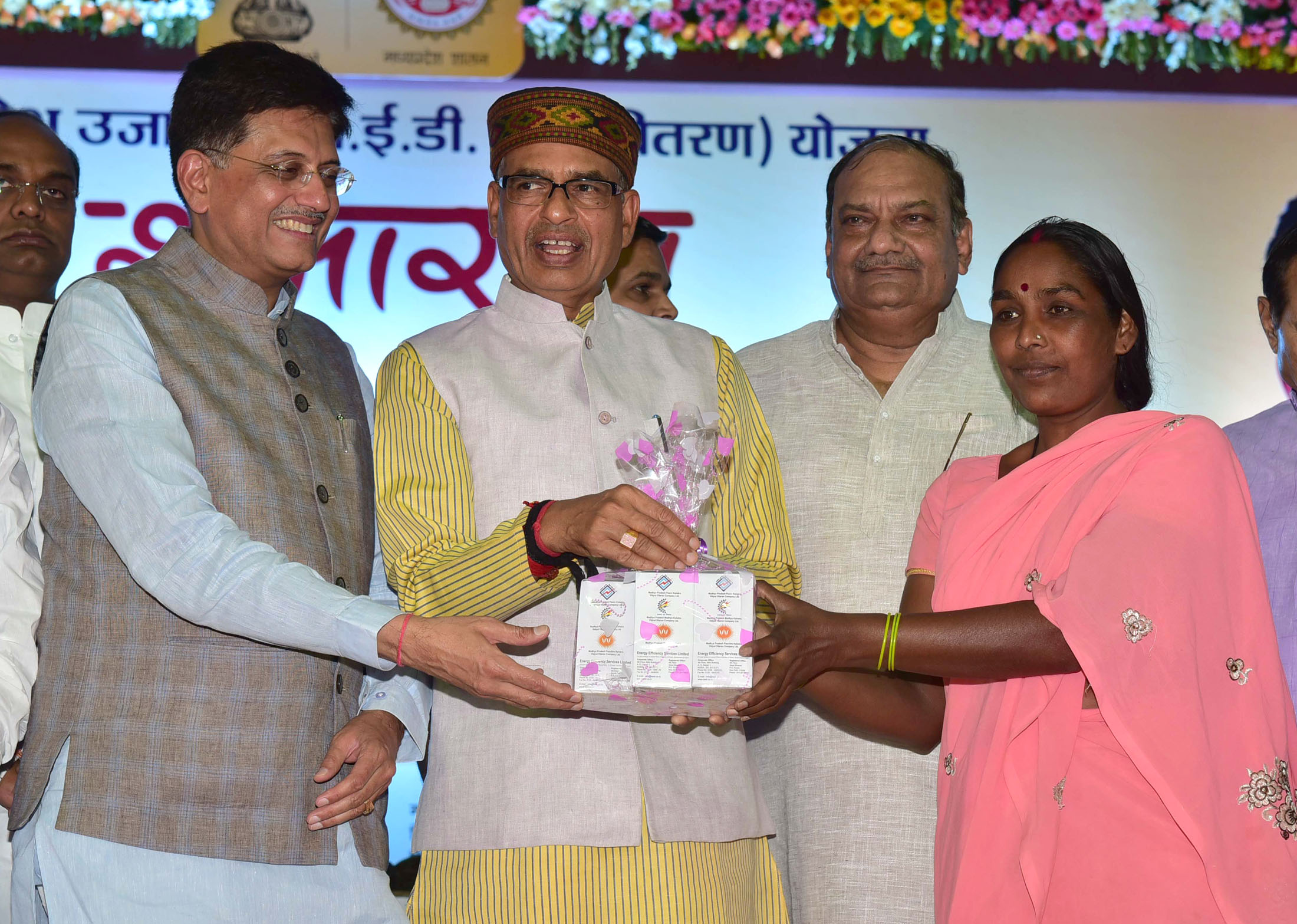
Chouhan with Union Cabinet Minister Piyush Goyal distributing LED Bulbs to citizens at the launch of the UJALA Scheme in Madhya Pradesh at Bhopal

Chouhan was first elected to the State Assembly from Budhni Constituency in 1990. He was elected a Member of Parliament for the first time in his career in 10th Lok Sabha from Vidisha Constituency in the following year.

In 1996, he was re-elected to the 11th Lok Sabha (his second term). He was Member of Committee on Urban and Rural Development and Member of Consultative Committee, Ministry of Human Resources Development and Member of Committee on Urban and Rural Development from 1996 to 1997 and Member of Committee on Urban and Rural Development, General Secretary of BJP, Madhya Pradesh from 1997 to 1998.

Again in 1998, he was re-elected to 12th Lok Sabha (third term). He was Member of Committee on Urban and Rural Development and its Sub-Committee on Ministry of Rural Areas and Employment from 1998 to 1999.

His fourth term in the 13th Lok Sabha was from 1999. He was member of Committee on Agriculture from 1999 to 2000, member of Committee on Public Undertakings from 1999 to 2001, and National President of Bhartiya Janta Yuva Morcha from 2000 to 2003. He was also the Chairman of House Committee (Lok Sabha) and National Secretary of Bhartiya Janta Party.

The BJP swept Madhya Pradesh in the Assembly elections of December 2003. At that time, Shivraj Singh contested polls unsuccessfully against the incumbent Chief Minister Digvijaya Singh from Raghogarh.

He was a member of Consultative Committee, ministry of Communications from 2000 to 2004. He was re-elected to 14th Lok Sabha (5th term) in 2004, with a margin of over 260,000 votes. He was member of Committee on Agriculture, member of Joint Committee on Offices of Profit, National General Secretary of BJP, Secretary of Parliamentary Board, and Secretary (Central Election Committee). He also headed Housing Committee of Lok Sabha, and was a member of Committee on Ethics. He was elected to 18th Lok Sabha from Vidisha with a margin of 8,21,408 votes.

=== Chief Minister of Madhya Pradesh ===
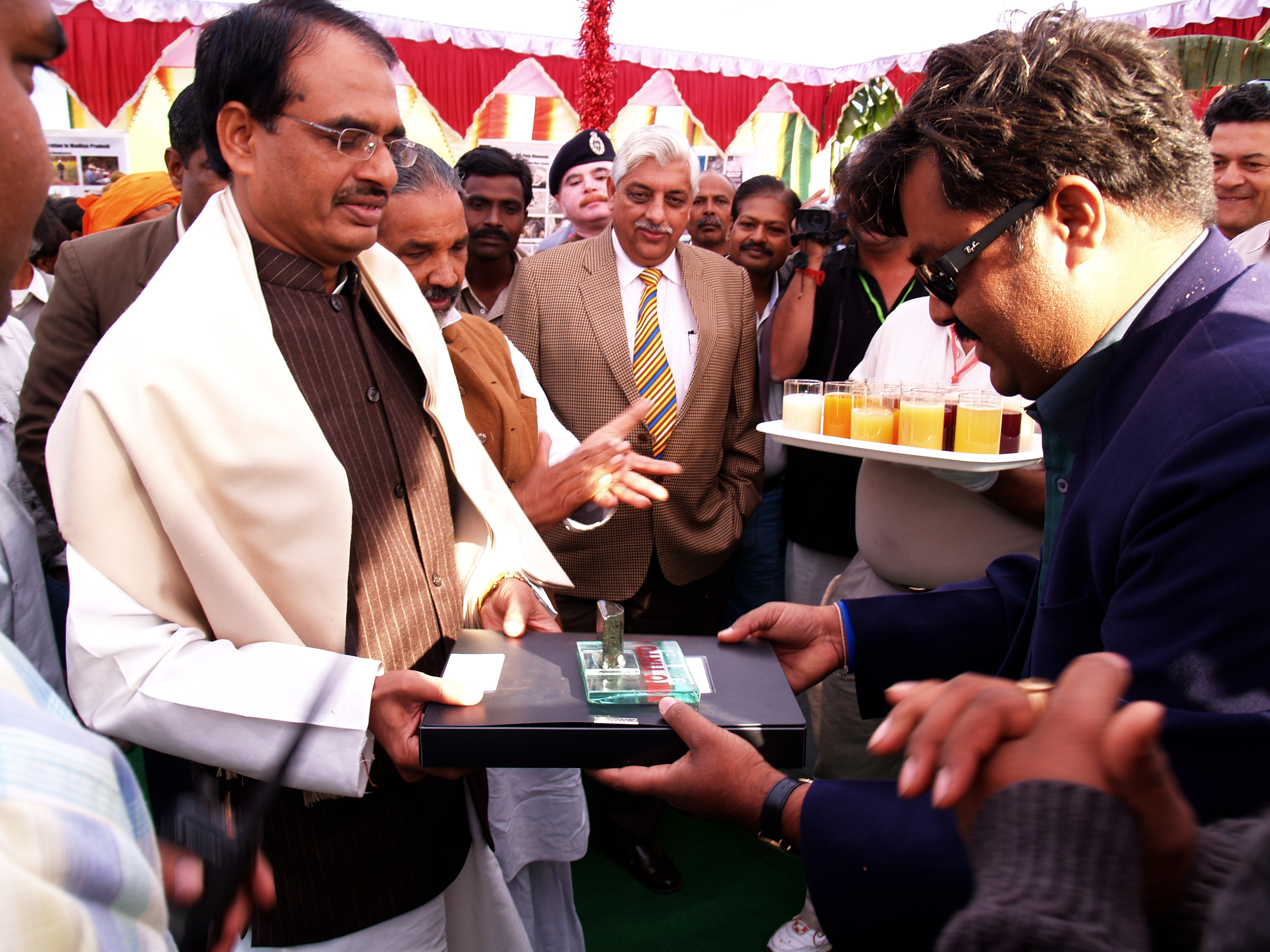
Shivraj Singh Chouhan's visit at Bunder in 2008

As the state BJP President, Chouhan was chosen to become the Chief Minister of Madhya Pradesh on 30 November 2005. He contested a by-election from Budhni assembly constituency the following year, winning his old seat by a margin of over 36,000 votes.

In 2008, Chouhan retained his Budhni seat by over 41,000 votes, and with it, led the BJP to a second consecutive victory in the state. On 12 December 2008, he was sworn in for his second term.

On 8 December 2013, Chouhan won Legislative Assembly elections from Budhni by the margin of 84,805 from a candidate of BJP. He was also elected as Chief Minister of MP for a third term.

On 12 December 2018, after failing to gain a majority in the 2018 Madhya Pradesh assembly election, Chouhan resigned as Chief Minister. He once again took oath as the Chief Minister of Madhya Pradesh on 23 March 2020 after 22 Congress MLA's resigned along with Jyotiraditya Scindia resulting in the collapse of the Kamal Nath government. As of December 2023, Chouhan is the longest-serving chief minister from the Bharatiya Janata Party.

== Election history ==
=== Lok Sabha ===
Year	Constituency	Party	Votes	%	Opponent	Opponent party	Opponent votes	%	Result	Margin	%
2024	Vidisha	BJP	11,16,460	76.70	Pratap Bhanu Sharma	INC	2,95,052	20.27	Won	8,21,408	56.43
2004	Vidisha	BJP	4,28,030	65.19	Narbada Prasad Sharma	INC	1,67,304	25.48	Won	2,60,726	39.71
1999	Vidisha	BJP	3,60,421	55.65	Jasvant Singh	INC	2,78,024	42.93	Won	82,397	12.72
1998	Vidisha	BJP	3,74,406	56.99	Ashutosh Dayal Sharma	INC	2,36,548	36.01	Won	1,37,858	20.98
1996	Vidisha	BJP	3,10,580	54.15	Hridaya Mohan Jain	INC	1,34,822	23.51	Won	1,75,758	30.64

=== Madhya Pradesh Legislative Assembly ===
Year	Constituency	Party	Votes	%	Opponent	Opponent party	Opponent votes	%	Result	Margin	%
2023	Budhni	BJP	1,64,951	70.7	Vikram Mastal Sharma	INC	59,977	25.71	Won	1,04,974	44.99
2018	Budhni	BJP	1,23,492	60.25	Arun Subhashchandra Yadav	INC	64,493	31.47	Won	58,999	28.78
2013	Budhni	BJP	1,28,730	69.99	Dr. Mahendra Singh Chouhan	INC	43,925	23.88	Won	84,805	46.11
2008	Budhni	BJP	75,828	62.15	Mahesh Singh Rajput	INC	34,303	28.12	Won	41,525	34.03
2006*	Budhni	BJP	66,689	59.07	Raj Kumar Patel	INC	30,164	26.72	Won	36,525	32.35

- (*) denotes by-election

== Awards and recognition ==
- 2011 NDTV Indian of the year award - Leader of New India (development).
- 2016 Suryoday Manavta Seva Sanman award.
- Champions of Change (award) 2022.

== See also ==
- Shivraj Singh Chouhan Third ministry (2013–2018)
- Third Modi ministry

Lok Sabha
Preceded by Atal Bihari Vajpayee	Member of Parliament for Vidisha; 1991 – 2006	Succeeded by Rampal Singh
Political offices
Preceded by Babulal Gaur	Chief Minister of Madhya Pradesh; 29 November 2005 – 16 December 2018	Succeeded by Kamal Nath
Preceded by Kamal Nath	Chief Minister of Madhya Pradesh; 20 March 2020– 13 December 2024	Succeeded by Mohan Yadav
Government offices
Preceded by Arjun Munda, Giriraj Singh	Minister of Agriculture and Farmers' Welfare Welfare and Minister of Rural Development; 10 June 2024 – present	Succeeded by
