= Badjhiri =

- village
- Location within Madhya Pradesh Location within India
- Coordinates: 23.1283773°N 77.2778694°E
- Country: India
- State: Madhya Pradesh
- District: Bhopal
- Tehsil: Huzur
- Elevation: 541 m (1,775 ft)

Population (2011)
  - Total: 1,351
- Time zone: UTC+5:30 (IST)
- ISO 3166 code: MP-IN
- 2011 census code: 482503

Badjhiri is a village in the Bhopal district of Madhya Pradesh, India. It is located in the Huzur tehsil and the Phanda block.

== Demographics ==
According to the 2011 census of India, Badjhiri has 230 households. The effective literacy rate (i.e. the literacy rate of population excluding children aged 6 and below) is 73.47%.

Demographics (2011 Census)
	Total	Male	Female
Population	1351	691	660
Children aged below 6 years	175	90	85
Scheduled caste	112	58	54
Scheduled tribe	20	12	8
Literates	864	523	341
Workers (all)	511	365	146
Main workers (total)	380	328	52
Main workers: Cultivators	276	246	30
Main workers: Agricultural labourers	40	32	8
Main workers: Household industry workers	10	8	2
Main workers: Other	54	42	12
Marginal workers (total)	131	37	94
Marginal workers: Cultivators	77	16	61
Marginal workers: Agricultural labourers	38	13	25
Marginal workers: Household industry workers	10	5	5
Marginal workers: Others	6	3	3
Non-workers	840	326	514
