= Barrai, Berasia =

Barrai
- village
- Location within Madhya Pradesh Location within India
- Coordinates: 23.710210°N 77.524555°E
- Country: India
- State: Madhya Pradesh
- District: Bhopal
- Tehsil: Berasia

Population (2011)
  - Total: 719
- Time zone: UTC+5:30 (IST)
- ISO 3166 code: MP-IN
- Census code: 482183

Barrai is a village in the Bhopal district of Madhya Pradesh, India. It is located in the Berasia tehsil.

== Demographics ==
According to the 2011 census of India, Barrai has 156 households. The effective literacy rate (i.e. the literacy rate of population excluding children aged 6 and below) is 62.76%.

Demographics (2011 Census)
	Total	Male	Female
Population	719	371	348
Children aged below 6 years	131	74	57
Scheduled caste	148	75	73
Scheduled tribe	0	0	0
Literates	369	222	147
Workers (all)	207	180	27
Main workers (total)	207	180	27
Main workers: Cultivators	97	97	0
Main workers: Agricultural labourers	103	78	25
Main workers: Household industry workers	0	0	0
Main workers: Other	7	5	2
Marginal workers (total)	0	0	0
Marginal workers: Cultivators	0	0	0
Marginal workers: Agricultural labourers	0	0	0
Marginal workers: Household industry workers	0	0	0
Marginal workers: Others	0	0	0
Non-workers	512	191	321
