= Bijawan Kalan =

- village
- Location within Madhya Pradesh Location within India
- Coordinates: 23.720503°N 77.197647°E
- Country: India
- State: Madhya Pradesh
- District: Bhopal
- Tehsil: Berasia

Population (2011)
  - Total: 704
- Time zone: UTC+5:30 (IST)
- ISO 3166 code: MP-IN
- Census code: 482085

Bijawan Kalan is a village in the Bhopal district of Madhya Pradesh, India. It is located in the Berasia tehsil.

== Demographics ==
According to the 2011 census of India, Bijawan Kalan has 114 households. The effective literacy rate (i.e. the literacy rate of population excluding children aged 6 and below) is 44.01%.

Demographics (2011 Census)
	Total	Male	Female
Population	704	377	327
Children aged below 6 years	136	72	64
Scheduled caste	106	56	50
Scheduled tribe	2	0	2
Literates	250	168	82
Workers (all)	386	211	175
Main workers (total)	176	164	12
Main workers: Cultivators	169	159	10
Main workers: Agricultural labourers	7	5	2
Main workers: Household industry workers	0	0	0
Main workers: Other	0	0	0
Marginal workers (total)	210	47	163
Marginal workers: Cultivators	14	7	7
Marginal workers: Agricultural labourers	195	39	156
Marginal workers: Household industry workers	0	0	0
Marginal workers: Others	1	1	0
Non-workers	318	166	152
