= Semri Bazyaft =

- village
- Location within Madhya Pradesh Location within India
- Coordinates: 23.1648877°N 77.2951057°E
- Country: India
- State: Madhya Pradesh
- District: Bhopal
- Tehsil: Huzur
- Elevation: 537 m (1,762 ft)

Population (2011)
  - Total: 877
- Time zone: UTC+5:30 (IST)
- ISO 3166 code: MP-IN
- 2011 census code: 482518

Semri Bazyaft is a village in the Bhopal district of Madhya Pradesh, India. It is in the Huzur tehsil and the Phanda block.

== Demographics ==
According to the 2011 census of India, Semri Bazyaft has 191 households. The effective literacy rate (i.e. the literacy rate excluding children aged 6 and below) is 65.33%.

Demographics (2011 Census)
	Total	Male	Female
Population	877	449	428
Children aged below 6 years	130	63	67
Scheduled caste	162	82	80
Scheduled tribe	29	16	13
Literates	488	295	193
Workers (all)	487	238	249
Main workers (total)	389	224	165
Main workers: Cultivators	92	56	36
Main workers: Agricultural labourers	284	157	127
Main workers: Household industry workers	1	1	0
Main workers: Other	12	10	2
Marginal workers (total)	98	14	84
Marginal workers: Cultivators	35	5	30
Marginal workers: Agricultural labourers	61	9	52
Marginal workers: Household industry workers	0	0	0
Marginal workers: Others	2	0	2
Non-workers	390	211	179
