= William Townshend (cricketer) =

English cricketer and clergyman

Personal information
- Full name: William Townshend
- Born: 16 November 1849; Sehore, Bhopal State, British India
- Died: 19 July 1923 (aged 73); Kirkby Mallory, Leicestershire, England
- Batting: Right-handed

Domestic team information
- Years: Team
- 1870–1872: Oxford University
- 1874: Marylebone Cricket Club

Career statistics
Competition	First-class
Matches	16
Runs scored	460
Batting average	15.86
100s/50s	–/2
Top score	55
Catches/stumpings	6/–
- Source: Cricinfo, 18 August 2019

William Townshend (16 November 1849 – 19 July 1923) was an English first-class cricketer and clergyman.

The son of Edward Dupré Townshend, he was born in British India at Sehore in November 1849. He was educated in England at Rossall School, before going up to Brasenose College, Oxford where he graduated B.A. in 1872 and M.A. in 1879.

While studying at Oxford, he made his debut in first-class cricket for Oxford University against the Gentlemen of England at Oxford in 1870. He played first-class cricket for Oxford until 1872, making fourteen appearances. He scored a total of 399 runs in his fourteen matches for Oxford, averaging 15.96 and making a high score of 55. He somewhat failed to live up the batting reputation he had gained at Rossall School, where he was considered the second best batsman at the school after F. W. Wright.

He later played first-class cricket in 1874, appearing in two matches, making an appearance each for the Gentlemen of England and the Marylebone Cricket Club. He played county cricket for Cheshire, Denbighshire, Herefordshire, Leicestershire and Shropshire (appearing for two matches for the latter in 1869).

After leaving Oxford he became a priest in the Church of England. He was the rector of Thurlaston in Leicestershire in 1880. Townshend died in Leicestershire at Kirkby Mallory in July 1923.
