= Ashta, Madhya Pradesh =

Ashta Ashtah
- City
- Location in Madhya Pradesh, India Ashta (India)
- Coordinates: 23.02°N 76.72°E
- Country: India
- State: Madhya Pradesh
- District: Sehore
- Elevation: 519 m (1,703 ft)

Population (2011)
  - Total: 53,462

Languages
  - Official: Hindi
- Time zone: UTC+5:30 (IST)
- Postal code: 466116
- ISO 3166 code: IN-MP
- Vehicle registration: MP

Ashta is a city and a municipality in Sehore district in the state of Madhya Pradesh, India.

== Geography ==
Ashta is located at 23.02°N 76.72°E. It has an average elevation of 519 metres (1702 feet).

Running through the center of the city is a river named Parvati, after the Hindu goddess Parvati. The river is the main source of water for the city's inhabitants. Near the river, there is a temple to Shiva, husband to the goddess, which is believed to date back as far as 3500 years. Locals believe that in the month of Sawan (during the rainy season), the river Parvati gets flooded with water and the water level rises until that level when it reaches to Shiv-Ling (Lingam) in the Shiva temple on its bank.

== History ==
During the British India period, this area was ruled by Mirza Amjad Baig, regarded as the founder of present-day Ashta. He not only brought transportation to the city but also established an education system for both men and women.

== Transport ==
Ashta is on the Bhopal to Indore road, which also runs through Sehore and Dewas. A daily bus service is available in Ashta.

The nearest airport is Bhopal.

== Places ==
Ashta's facilities include hospitals, schools, a cinema hall, and road transport. There are 194 rural villages in the Ashta administrative block. Ashta is also known for its grain market, known as "Mandi" in local language. Products sold in the grain market include soybean and wheat.

== Demographics ==
As of India's 2011 census, Ashta's population was 53,184. Male population was 27591(51.90%), and female population was 25593(48.12%). Ashta had an average literacy rate of 68.23%.

The population of children aged 0-6 was 7483, which was 14.07% of the total population of Ashta (M + OG). In Ashta Municipality, the female sex ratio was 928 against the state average of 931. Moreover, the child sex ratio in Ashta was around 933 compared to the Madhya Pradesh state average of 918.

== Municipality ==
Ashta city is divided into 19 wards for which elections are held every five years.

Ashta Municipality has total administration of over 10,006 houses to which it supplies basic amenities like water and sewerage. It is also authorized to build roads within municipality limits and tax the properties in its jurisdiction.

== See also ==
- Wolves of Ashta
