= Barrai, Huzur =

Barrai
- village
- Location within Madhya Pradesh Location within India
- Coordinates: 23.181316°N 77.500793°E
- Country: India
- State: Madhya Pradesh
- District: Bhopal
- Tehsil: Huzur

Population (2011)
  - Total: 1,127
- Time zone: UTC+5:30 (IST)
- ISO 3166 code: MP-IN
- Census code: 482550

Barrai is a village in the Bhopal district of Madhya Pradesh, India. It is located in the Huzur tehsil and the Phanda block.

== Demographics ==
According to the 2011 census of India, Barrai has 207 households. The effective literacy rate (i.e. the literacy rate of population excluding children aged 6 and below) is 57.17%.

Demographics (2011 Census)
	Total	Male	Female
Population	1127	614	513
Children aged below 6 years	221	118	103
Scheduled caste	134	77	57
Scheduled tribe	203	108	95
Literates	518	317	201
Workers (all)	403	310	93
Main workers (total)	358	292	66
Main workers: Cultivators	90	88	2
Main workers: Agricultural labourers	73	63	10
Main workers: Household industry workers	5	4	1
Main workers: Other	190	137	53
Marginal workers (total)	45	18	27
Marginal workers: Cultivators	3	1	2
Marginal workers: Agricultural labourers	24	4	20
Marginal workers: Household industry workers	1	0	1
Marginal workers: Others	17	13	4
Non-workers	724	304	420
