= Parbati River (Madhya Pradesh) =

Coordinates: 25°50′40″N 76°33′48″E

Parvati River
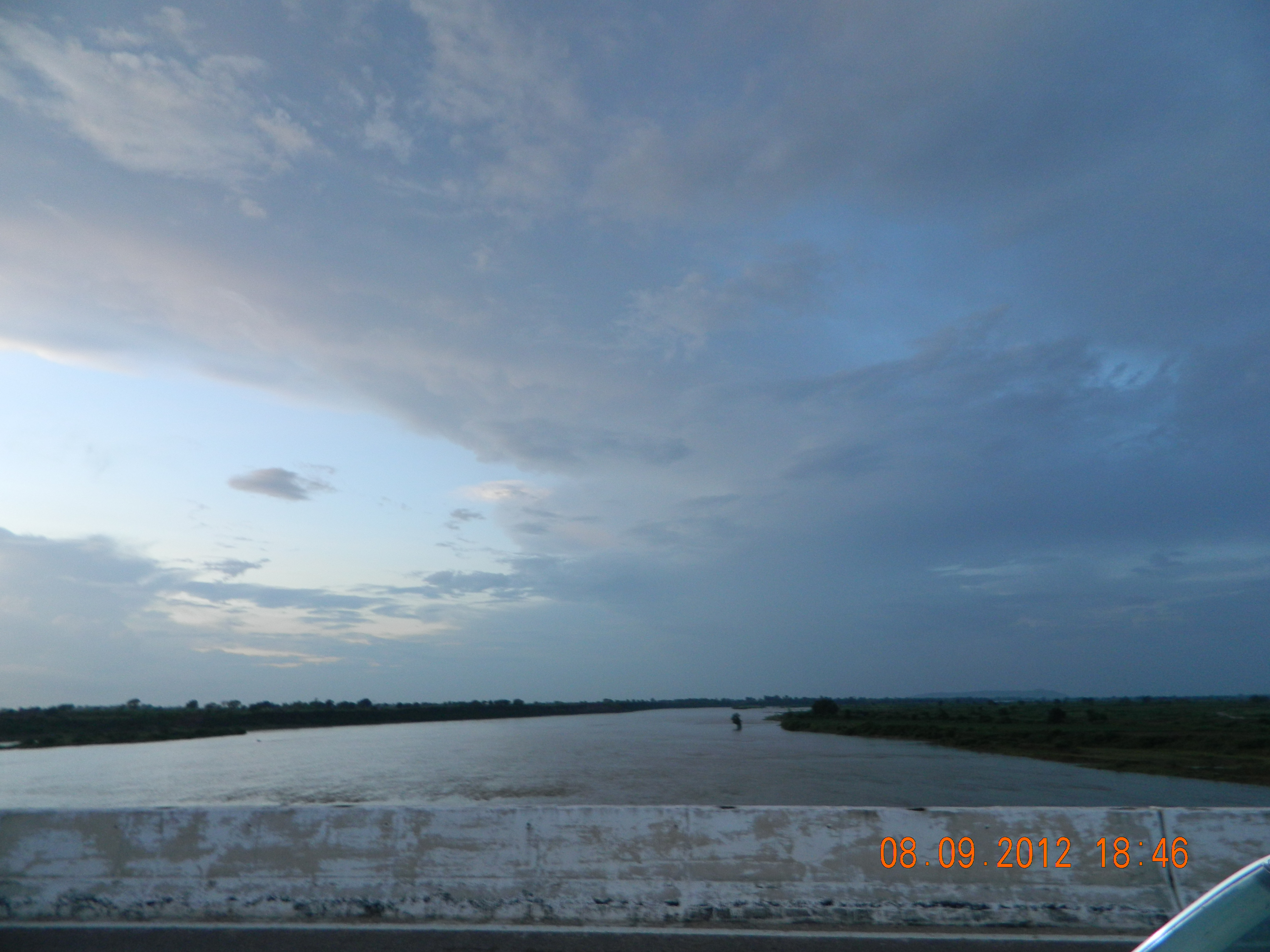
- Parvati River in Baran

Location
- Country: India
- States: Madhya Pradesh and Rajasthan
- Major Town: Ashta, Kawai, Atru

Physical characteristics
- Source: Pithapura Lake near Siddikganj
  - location: Vindhya Range in Sehore District in Madhya Pradesh
  - elevation: 610 m (2,000 ft)
- Mouth: Chambal River
  - location: National Ghariyal Sanctuary near Palin village Sawai Madhopur District in Rajasthan
- Length: 436 km (271 mi)

Parvati River is a river in Madhya Pradesh and Rajasthan, India that flows into the Chambal River. The river rises at a height of 610 m in the Vindhya Range in Sehore district Madhya Pradesh and flows in Sehore District, Rajgarh District, Guna District of Madhya Pradesh and then enters in Rajasthan and flows from Baran District and Sawai Madhopur District of Rajasthan where it falls into Chambal River in Sawai Madhopur District and runs for 436 km. It is one of the Chambal River's three main tributaries, along with the Banas River and the Kali Sindh River. Ramgarh crater is located on its eastern bank. Many small villages and tribes are situated on its bank, which utilise it for various purposes, such as irrigation, drinking, washing, etc.

== See also ==
- Geology of Vindhyachal

In Rajgarh or Guna District of M.P., Parvati River is the main source of water for households and Agricultural uses. In Guna district, large number of people depend on its water.
