= Sehore =

Sehore Siddhapur
- City
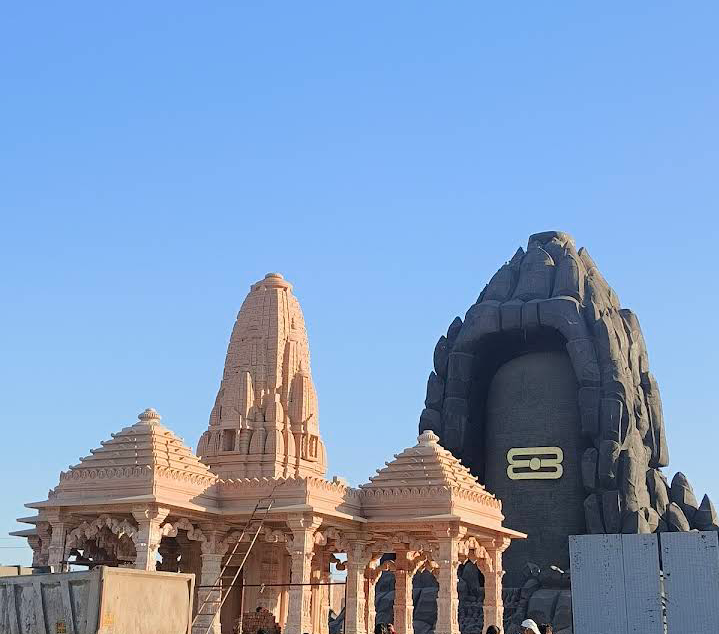
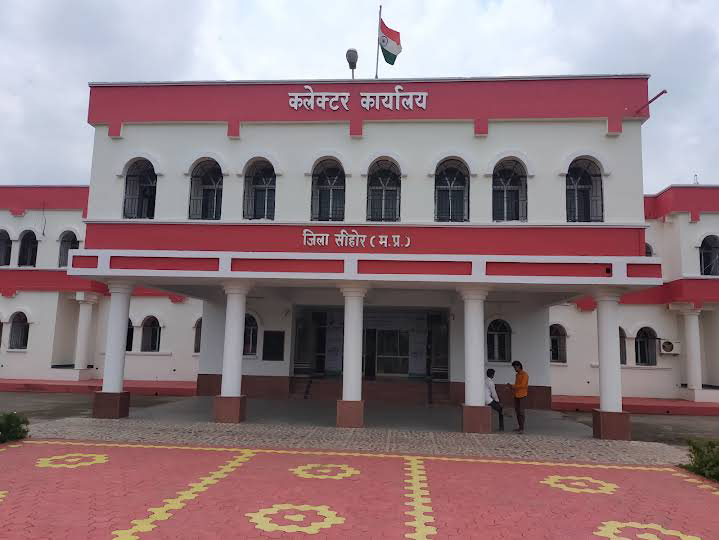
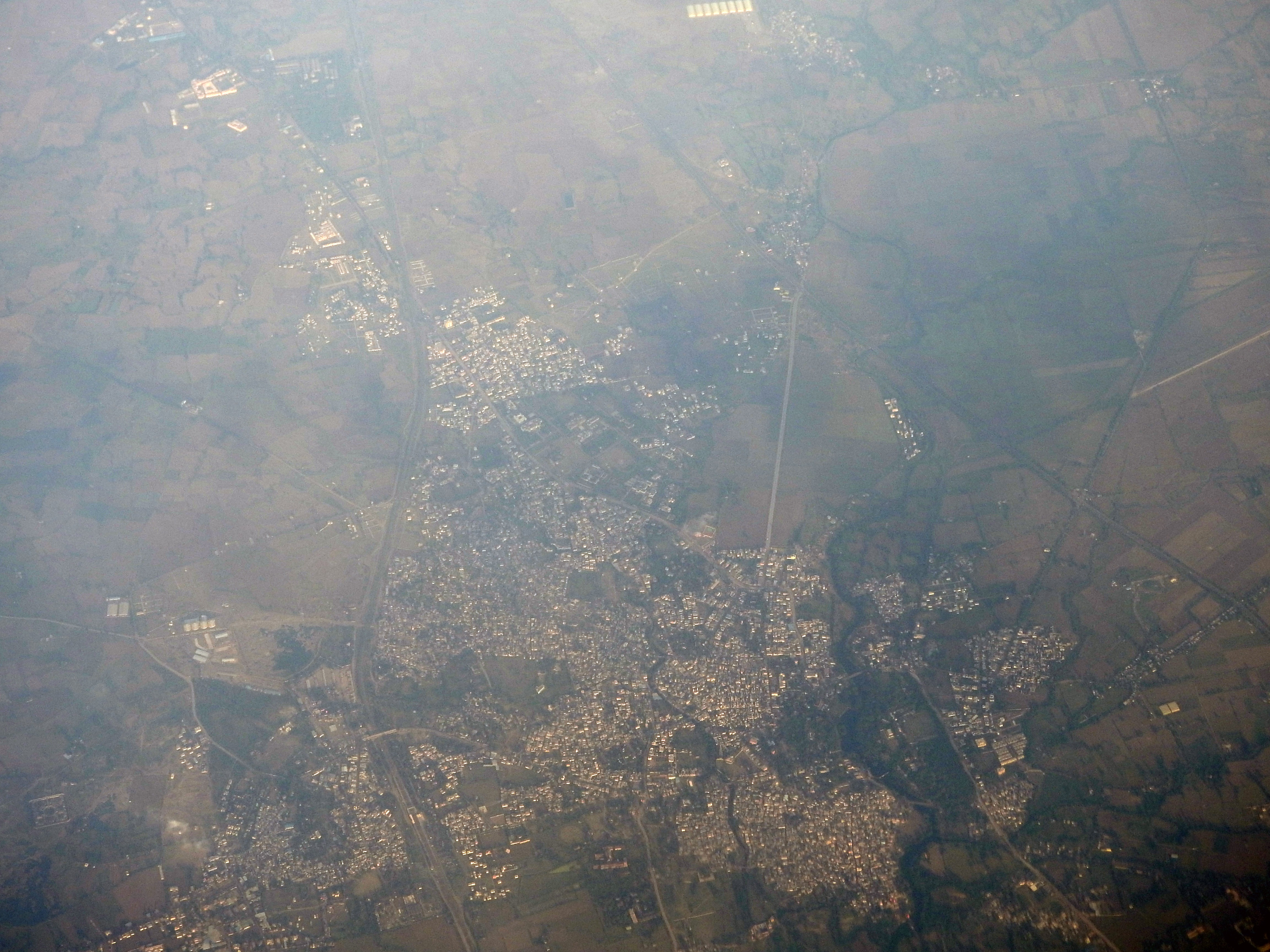
- Kubreshwar Mandir, Collecter building Sehore, Aerial photo of Sehore

- Location in Madhya Pradesh, India
- Coordinates: 23.2°N 77.08°E
- Country: India
- State: Madhya Pradesh
- District: Sehore
- Region: Malwa

Government
  - Type: Mayor-Council
  - Body: Sehore Municipal Council
  - MLA: Sudesh Rai, (BJP)
- Elevation: 502 m (1,647 ft)

Population (2011)
  - Total: 109,118

Languages
  - Official: Hindi
- Time zone: UTC+5:30 (IST)
- PIN: 466001
- Telephone code: 07562
- Vehicle registration: MP-37
- Website: sehore.nic.in

Sehore is a city and a municipality in Sehore district in the Indian state of Madhya Pradesh. It is the district headquarters of Sehore District and is located on the Bhopal-Sehore-Indore highway, 38 km from Bhopal.

== History ==
Sehore stands at the foothills of the Vindhya Range in the middle of the Malwa region. It has a long and glorious past. Shaiva, Shakta, Jain, Vaishnav, Buddhists and Nath priests made Sehore a significant seat of meditation/ worship. Sehore was a part of the Bhopal estate. After formation of Madhya Pradesh, it was bifurcated, in 1972 and a new district - Bhopal - was carved out of it.

Ancient lore states that Maharshi Patanjali, the illustrious founder of a Yoga sect, also spent some time here in prayer, penance and worship. Folklore also points to the visits of Lord Rama, Laxman and Sita to different places in and around Sehore. Sehore has many temples, Mutts, Shrines, Mosques and Churches of historical antiquity and religious significance. Sehore, thus, boasts of a glorious tradition of communal harmony and culture.

Sidhhapur is the old name of Sehore. According to a rock-edict found in the Seevan river, it got its name from Sidrapur. According to an old document, Sehore got its name from the Anglo-Indian corruption of Sher or Lion as pronounced by the British, since lions or "Sher"s were in abundance in the nearby jungles.

Sehore has been an integral part of Awanti. Later on, it was under the tutelage of the Magadh dynasty, Chandragupta I, Harshavardhan, Ashoka, Raja Bhoj, Peshwa chiefs, Rani Kamlapati and the Nawabs of the Bhopal dynasty. Sehore remained the headquarters of the political agent and resident of the British Raj till Indian independence in 1947.

Rivers big and small abound in the landscape of Sehore. Narmada, Parwati, Dudhi, Newaj, Kolar, Papnas, Kulans, Seewan, Lotia and other rivers tell a sad tale of lost splendor in the form of scattered idols found in them. Idols of Lord Vishnu, Ganesha, Shiva, Parvati, Nandi, Garuda, Lord Mahavira, Gautam Buddha, Apsaras and fairies have been found in different forms and postures.

During the Indian Rebellion of 1857, Sehore revolted against Company rule; in response, Robert Hamilton led a detachment of the Bombay Army which restored Company control over the town from the rebels, which included mutinying sepoys from the Presidency armies. Hundreds of rebels were captured, put on trial and executed by hanging or firing squad for their role in the rebellion. The Nawab of Bhopal, Sikandar Begum, refused to join the rebellion, which played a major role in assisting its suppression in the region.

On 15 August 1947, India became independent from British colonial rule. But the estate of Bhopal did not merge with the India state till 1949 and even that after a fierce struggle. Sehore has honorable mention in the fields of academics and literature. Lanciet Likinson, the political agent, got written the first English translation of Abhijñānaśākuntalam in 1835–40.

The High School of Sehore founded in 1835 by political agent Likinson, had to its credit, students like Hidayatullah (former Chief Justice of the Supreme Court and Vice President of India) and Banchu (Ex-chief justice) Mirza Faim Begh (chief engineer).

== Geography ==
Sehore is 37 km from the state capital, Bhopal, towards the south-west and on the Bhopal - Indore highway. Its height from mean sea level is between 1500 ft. and 2000 ft. Sehore is situated on the Western Railway line from Bhopal to Ratlam. It is surrounded by 7 districts: Bhopal, Raisen, Harda, Hoshangabad, Dewas, Shajapur and Rajgarh. Sehore district extends between the parallels of Latitude 22'31 to 23'40 North and between the meridians of Longitude 76'22 and 78'08 East. Sehore is located at 23.2°N 77.08°E. It has an average elevation of 502 metres (1646 feet). The only river passing through the Sehore district is the Siven.

== Demographics ==
Religions in sehore
Religion	Percent
Hindus	73%
Muslims	22%
Jains	3.7%
Others†	1.3%
Distribution of religions †Includes Sikhs (0.2%), Buddhists (<0.2%).

As of 2001 India census, Sehore had a population of 90,930. Males constituted 52% of the population and females 48%. Sehore had an average literacy rate of 68%, higher than the national average of 59.5%: male literacy was 75% and female literacy was 61%. In Sehore, 14% of the population was under six years of age.

According to the 2011 census, Sehore municipality with outgrowth had a population of 109,118.

== Government ==
Sehore Assembly constituency is one of the 230 assembly constituencies of Madhya Pradesh. It comes under Bhopal (Lok Sabha constituency).Currently Sudesh Rai is mla from Sehore.

== Education ==
Some Education Institutes of Sehore

- Sri Satya Sai University of Technology & Medical Sciences, Sehore
- Chandra Shekhar Azad Government Lead College, Sehore
- Government Girls College, Sehore
- Jawahar Navodaya Vidyalaya, Shyampur, Sehore
- College of Agriculture, Sehore
- District Institute of Education & Training, Sehore

== Transport ==
Sehore railway station lies on the Ujjain - Sehore - Bhopal branch line. The station consists of two platforms. There are regular trains to Delhi, Kolkata, Chennai, Ahmedabad, Jaipur, Kanpur, Nagpur, Jammu, Puri and other major cities. The nearest airport is in Bhopal.

== Notable people ==
- William Townshend (1849–1923), English cricketer
- Iqbal Ahmad, Former District Magistrate (1980 - 1983)
- Shankar Lal Saboo - Former MLA
- Mortimer Durand, was an Indian Civil Servicer
- Munis Ansari, Indian Cricketer
