= Sehore district =

- District of Madhya Pradesh
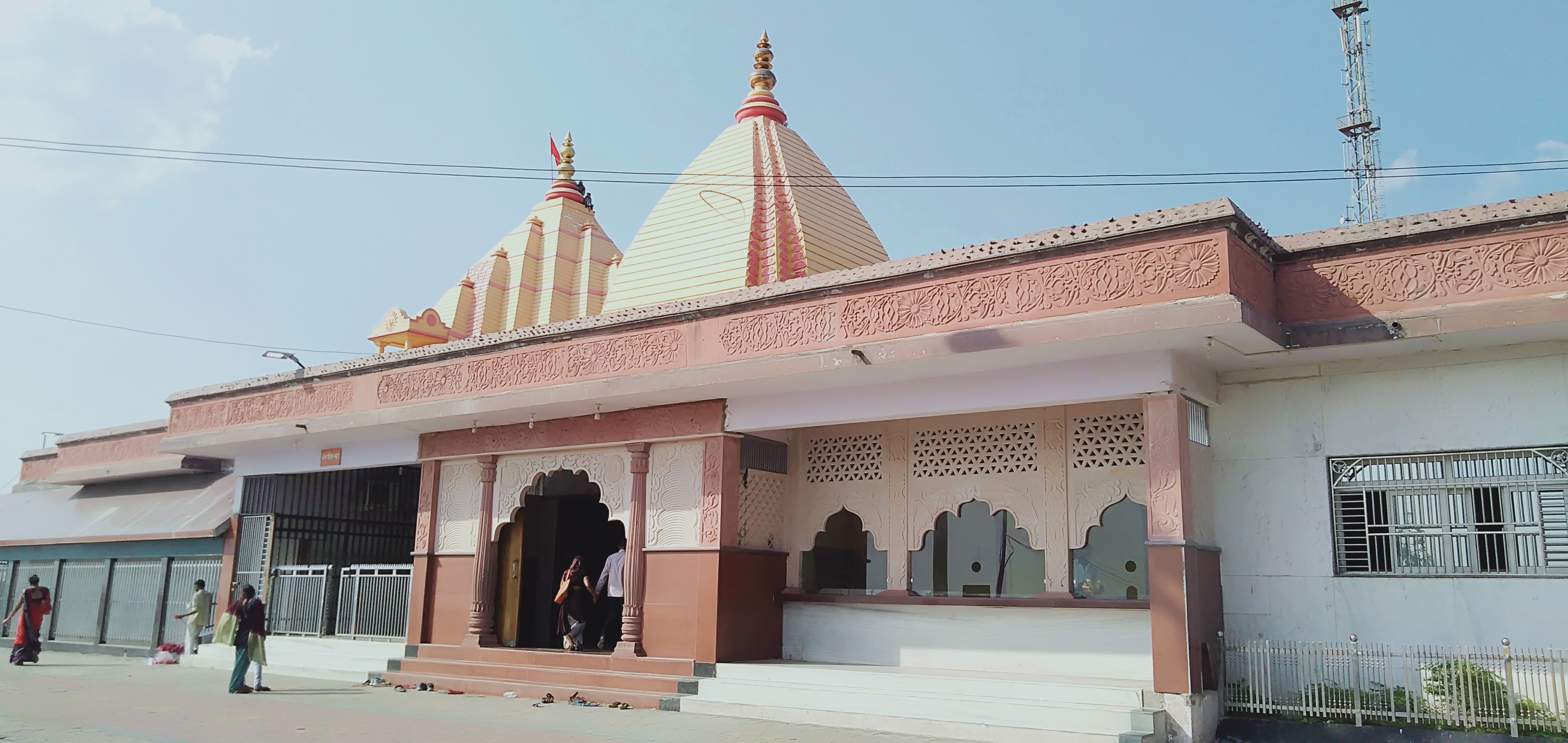
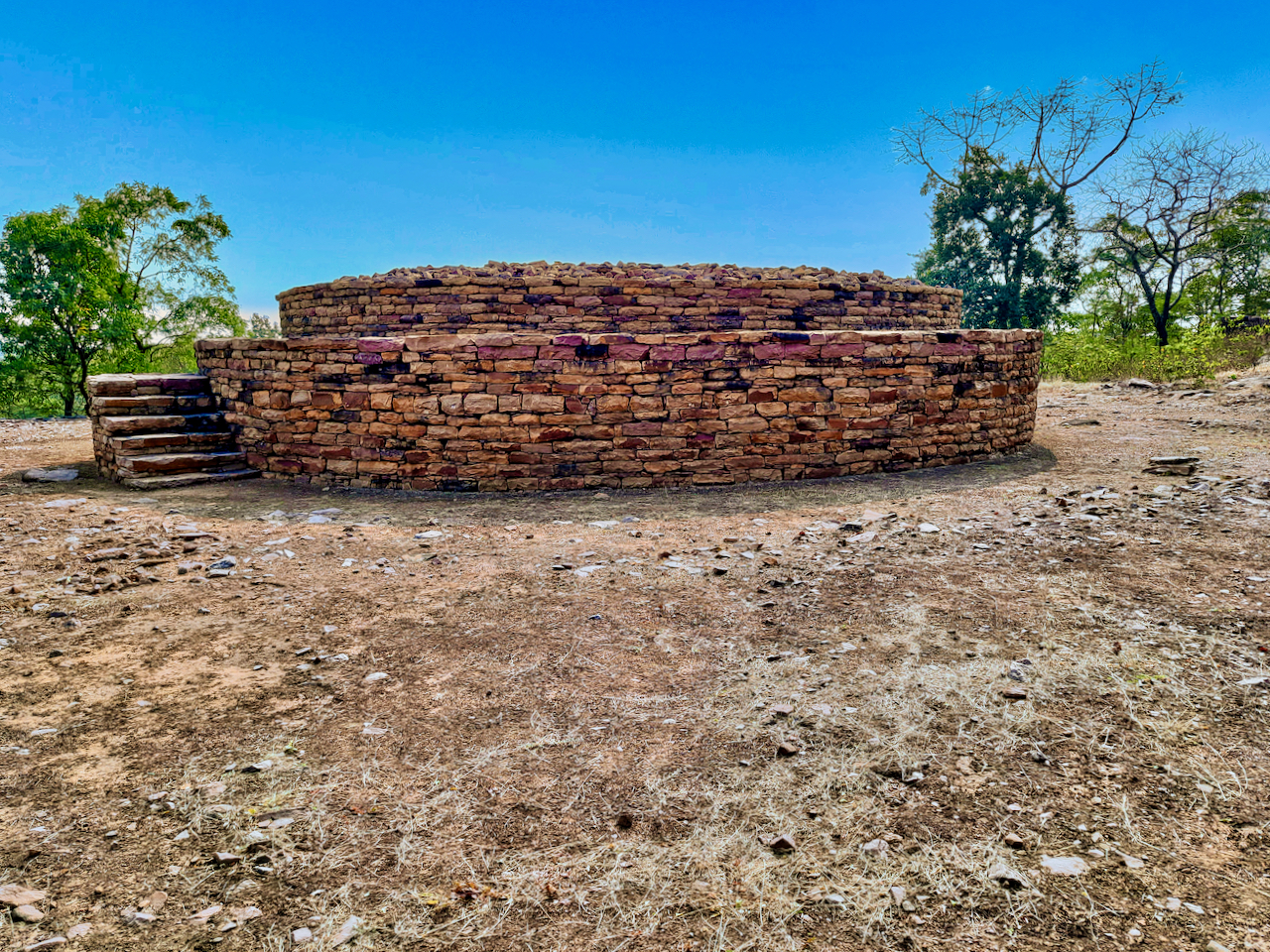
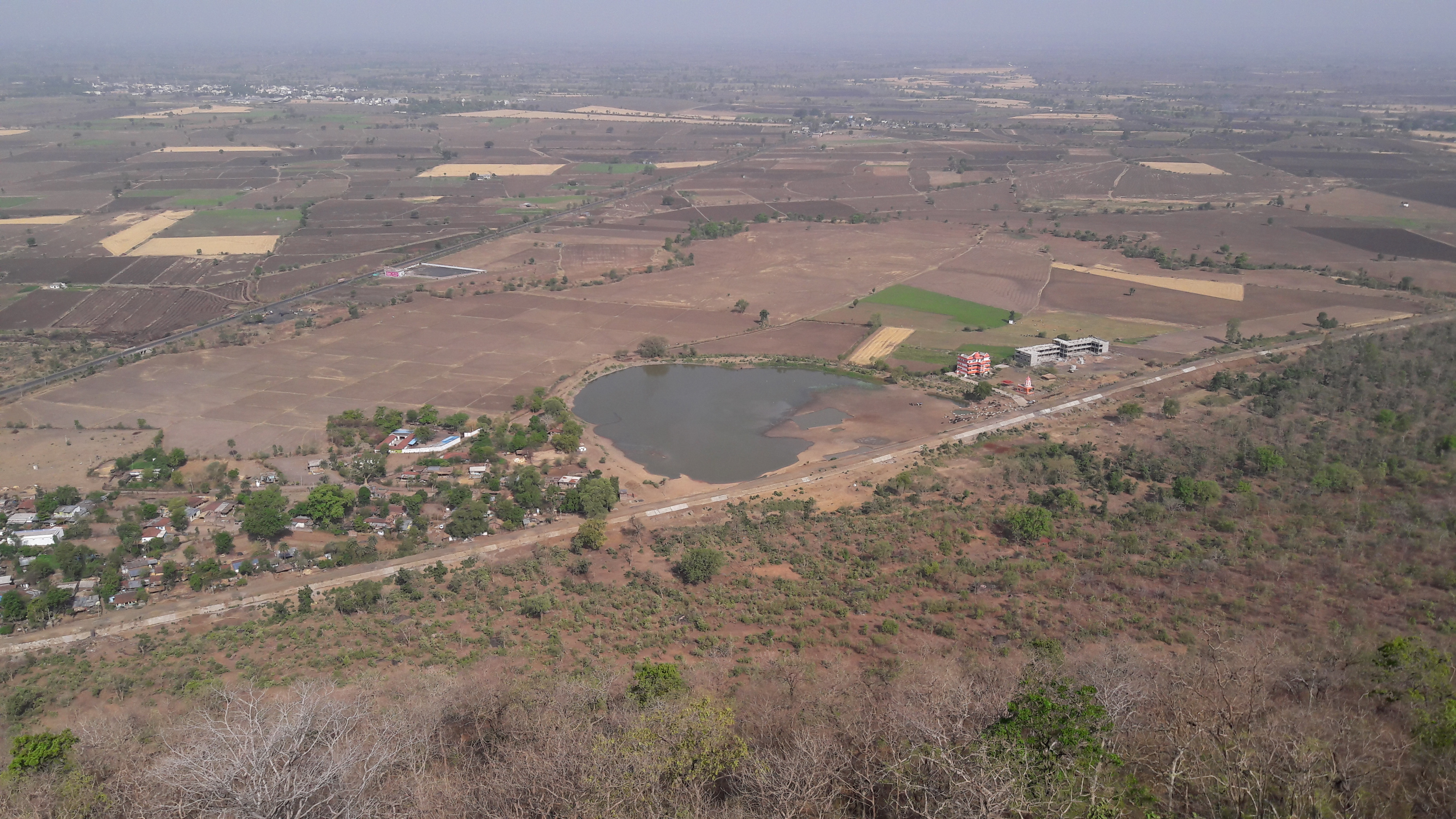
- Salkanpur Temple From left to right, top to bottom: Salkanpur Temple, stupas, aerial view of Salkanpur

- Location of Sehore district in Madhya Pradesh
- Coordinates (Sehore): 23°12′N 77°05′E
- Country: India
- State: Madhya Pradesh
- Division: Bhopal
- Headquarters: Sehore
- Tehsils: 8: 1. Sehore; 2. Ashta; 3. Budhni; 4. Bhairunda; 5. Rehti, 6. Ichhawar; 7. Shyampur; 8. Jawar

Government
  - Lok Sabha constituencies: Bhopal

Area
  - Total: 6,578 km^{2} (2,540 sq mi)

Population (2011)
  - Total: 1,311,332
  - Density: 199.4/km^{2} (516.3/sq mi)

Demographics
  - Literacy: 70.06%
  - Sex ratio: 918
- Time zone: UTC+05:30 (IST)
- Major highways: Bhopal-Indore Highway
- Website: sehore.nic.in

Sehore district (Hindi pronunciation: [siːɦoːɾ]) is a district of Madhya Pradesh state in central India. The town of Sehore is the district headquarters. The district is part of Bhopal Division.

== Geography ==
Sehore is 37 km from the state capital, Sehore is situated on the Western Railway line from Bhopal to Ratlam. It is surrounded by 7 districts: Bhopal, Raisen, Harda, Hoshangabad, Dewas, Shajapur and Rajgarh.The Major rivers passing through the Sehore district is the Seevan River Kolar River and Parvati River.

== Demographics ==
Historical population
Year	Pop.	±% p.a.
1901	234,308	—
1911	254,693	+0.84%
1921	242,362	−0.50%
1931	262,560	+0.80%
1941	278,270	+0.58%
1951	283,968	+0.20%
1961	381,286	+2.99%
1971	510,894	+2.97%
1981	657,381	+2.55%
1991	841,358	+2.50%
2001	1,078,912	+2.52%
2011	1,311,332	+1.97%

Religions in Sehore district (2011)
Religion	Percent
Hinduism	88.73%
Islam	10.52%
Jainism	0.48%
Other or not stated	0.27%

According to the 2011 census, Sehore District has a population of 1,311,332. This gives it a ranking of 373 in India (out of a total of 640). The district has a population density of 199 inhabitants per square kilometre (520/sq mi). Its population growth rate over the decade 2001-2011 was 21.51%. Sehore has a sex ratio of 918 females for every 1,000 males and a literacy rate of 71.11%. 18.95% of the population lives in urban areas. Scheduled Castes and Scheduled Tribes make up 20.69% and 11.10% of the population respectively.

Languages of Sehore district (2011)
1. Hindi (95.4%)
2. Urdu (2.31%)
3. Malvi (1.46%)
4. Others (0.85%)

According to the 2011 Census of India, 95.38% of the population in the district spoke Hindi, 2.31% Urdu and 1.46% Malvi as their first language.

== Administration ==
There are 4 Assembly of Sehore districts that are governed by MLAs:

- 156 Budhni
- 157 Ashta
- 158 Ichhawar
- 159 Sehore

There are 9 tehsils in Sehore district: Sehore Urban, Sehore Rural, Shyampur, Ashta, Jawar, Ichhawar, Bhairunda (otherwise Nasrullaganj), Budni and Rehti.

== Economy Of Sehore ==
Sehore is one of the fastest developing districts of Madhya Pradesh.

=== Agriculture ===
Sehore district is primarily an agricultural district occupying the Chambal and Narmada basin valley, having predominantly an agricultural economy. Agriculture is the main occupation of the people in the district. Wheat, Rice, Jawar, Maize and Soyabean are the major crops sown in the district.

=== Industries ===
Sehore has two industrial areas, Badiyakhedi and Budhni. Sehore's industrial landscape is thriving, particularly in sectors such as agro-processing, textiles, and manufacturing, contributing significantly to economic growth and employment generation. Big scale industries like ITC Limited, Vardhman Fabric and Trident group operated in Sehore District.

== Tourist places ==
- Kolar dam:- Kolar Dam Located in Sehore district, is known for a tourist attraction as well as boating
- Saru-Maru Caves:- Ancient Buddhist caves with stupas, offering a glimpse into the region's history.
- Kubereshwar Dham:- Famous for lord Shiva's temple Dedicated to Lord Shiva, this temple is of religious significance for the devotees. The architecture of the temple reflects traditional Indian temple design, with intricate carvings and sculptures adorning its structure.
- Shree Chintaman Ganesh Temple, Sehore
- Digambar waterfall
- Amargarh Waterfalls
- Aanwli Ghat

=== Bijasan Mata Temple, Salkanpur ===
This sacred Siddhpeeth of Vindhyavasni Bijasan Devi is a very ancient temple of Goddess “Durga” situated on an 800 feet high hill in Salkanpur village of Rehti tehsil. To reach the temple, devotees have to climb 1400 stairs.

== Transportation ==
Sehore is located on Ujjain–Bhopal section it own Railway Station which connects its major city of Madhya Pradesh.

It's 37 km away from state capital Bhopal and well connected with roads,

Nearby airport is Bhopal Airport.

== Notable people ==
- Shivraj Singh Chouhan, Indian Politician and Former Chief Minister of Madhya Pradesh.
- Umrao Singh, Indian Politician
- Shailendra Patel, Indian Politician
- William Townshend (1849–1923), English cricketer

== See also ==
- Shahganj
