= Ratlam Lok Sabha constituency =

Lok Sabha Constituency in Madhya Pradesh

Coordinates: 23.33°N 75.05°E

Ratlam
- Lok Sabha constituency
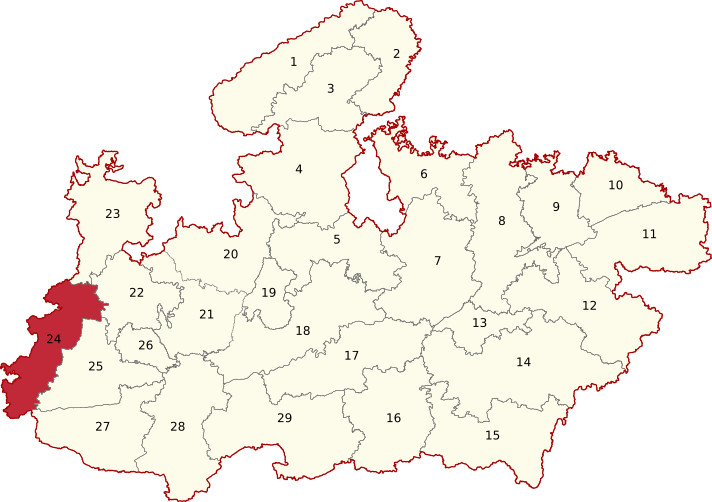
- Ratlam Lok Sabha constituency within Madhya Pradesh

Constituency details
- Country: India
- Region: Central India
- State: Madhya Pradesh
- Assembly constituencies: Alirajpur; Jobat; Jhabua; Thandla; Petlawad; Ratlam Rural; Ratlam City; Sailana
- Established: 1952
- Total electors: 1,246,756
- Reservation: ST

Member of Parliament
- 18th Lok Sabha
- Incumbent Anita Nagarsingh Chouhan
- Party: Bharatiya Janata Party
- Elected year: 2024

Ratlam Lok Sabha constituency (formerly, Jhabua Lok Sabha constituency) is one of the 29 Lok Sabha constituencies in Madhya Pradesh state in central India. This constituency is reserved for the candidates belonging to the Scheduled tribes. This constituency was renamed as Ratlam in 2008, following delimitation of the parliamentary constituencies. This constituency covers the entire Alirajpur and Jhabua districts and part of Ratlam district.

== Vidhan Sabha segments ==
Presently, Ratlam Lok Sabha constituency comprises the following eight Vidhan Sabha (legislative assembly) constituencies:

#	Name	District	Member	Party	2024 Lead
191	Alirajpur (ST)	Alirajpur	Chouhan Nagar Singh	BJP	BJP
192	Jobat (ST)	Alirajpur	Sena Mahesh Patel	INC	BJP
193	Jhabua (ST)	Jhabua	Dr. Vikrant Bhuriya	INC	BJP
194	Thandla (ST)	Jhabua	Veersingh Bhuriya	INC	BJP
195	Petlawad (ST)	Jhabua	Nirmala Bhuriya	BJP	BJP
219	Ratlam Rural (ST)	Ratlam	Mathuralal Damar	BJP	BJP
220	Ratlam City	Ratlam	Chetanya Kashyap	BJP	BJP
221	Sailana (ST)	Ratlam	Kamleshwar Dodiyar	BAP	INC

== Members of Parliament ==
Year	Member	Party
1952	Amar Singh Damar	Indian National Congress
1957	Amar Singh Damar	Indian National Congress
1962	Jamuna Devi	Indian National Congress
1967	Sur Singh	Indian National Congress
1971	Bhagirath Bhanwar	Samyukta Socialist Party
1977	Bhagirath Bhanwar	Janata Party
1980	Dileep Singh Bhuria	Indian National Congress
1984	Dileep Singh Bhuria	Indian National Congress
1989	Dileep Singh Bhuria	Indian National Congress
1991	Dileep Singh Bhuria	Indian National Congress
1996	Dileep Singh Bhuria	Indian National Congress
1998	Kantilal Bhuria	Indian National Congress
1999	Kantilal Bhuria	Indian National Congress
2004	Kantilal Bhuria	Indian National Congress
2009	Kantilal Bhuria	Indian National Congress
2014	Dileep Singh Bhuria	Bharatiya Janata Party
2015^	Kantilal Bhuria	Indian National Congress
2019	Guman Singh Damor	Bharatiya Janata Party
2024	Anita Nagarsingh Chouhan	Bharatiya Janata Party

^ by poll

== Election results ==
=== 2024 ===
2024 Indian general election: Ratlam
Party	Candidate	Votes	%	±%
BJP	Anita Nagarsingh Chouhan	795,863	51.93	+2.23
INC	Kantilal Bhuria	5,88,631	38.41	−4.82
NOTA	None of the above	31,735	2.07	−0.73
Majority		2,07,232	13.52	+7.05
Turnout		15,32,643	72.94	▼2.76
BJP hold		Swing		

=== 2019 ===
2019 Indian general elections: Ratlam
Party	Candidate	Votes	%	±%
BJP	Guman Singh Damor	696,103	49.70	+7.82
INC	Kantilal Bhuria	6,05,467	43.23	−6.96
NOTA	None of the Above	30,364	2.80	+0.52
BTP	Kamleshwr Bhil	14,784	1.06	new
Majority		90,636	6.47	−1.84
Turnout		14,01,335	75.70	+14.35
BJP gain from INC		Swing		

==== By poll 2015 ====
Bye-election, 2015: Ratlam
Party	Candidate	Votes	%	±%
INC	Kantilal Bhuria	536,743	50.19	+9.8
BJP	Nirmala Bhuria	4,47,911	41.88	−8.53
JD(U)	Vijay Hari	21,572	2.02	+0.81
RKSP	Kisan Singh Chouhan	14,301	1.34	new
IND.	Pawan Singh Dodiya	9,238	0.86	new
NOTA	None of the Above	24,426	2.28	−0.52
Majority		88,832	8.31	−1.71
Turnout		10,69,497	61.35	−2.24
INC gain from BJP		Swing		

=== General election 2014 ===
2014 Indian general elections: Ratlam
Party	Candidate	Votes	%	±%
BJP	Dileep Singh Bhuria	545,980	50.41	+11.00
INC	Kantilal Bhuria	4,37,523	40.39	−8.07
BSP	Babu Singh	18,485	1.71	new
JD(U)	Bheru Singh Damor	13,116	1.21	new
IND.	Meena Atul David	10,979	1.01	new
NOTA	None of the Above	30,364	2.80	new
Majority		1,08,457	10.02	+0.99
Turnout		10,82,690	63.59	+12.66
BJP gain from INC		Swing		

=== General election 2009 ===
2009 Indian general elections: Ratlam
Party	Candidate	Votes	%	±%
INC	Kantilal Bhuria	308,923	48.46	N/A
BJP	Dileepsingh Bhuria	2,51,255	39.41	N/A
Independent	Rameshwor Singar	22,946	3.60	N/A
Majority		57,668	9.03	N/A
Turnout		6,37,429	50.93	N/A
INC hold		Swing		

== See also ==
- Alirajpur district
- Jhabua district
- Ratlam district
- List of constituencies of the Lok Sabha
