= Jobat Assembly constituency =

Legislative Assembly constituency in Madhya Pradesh, India

Coordinates: 22.42°N 74.56°E

Jobat
- Constituency No. 192 for the Madhya Pradesh Legislative Assembly

Constituency details
- Country: India
- Region: Central India
- State: Madhya Pradesh
- District: Alirajpur
- Lok Sabha constituency: Ratlam
- Established: 1951
- Reservation: ST

Member of Legislative Assembly
- 16th Madhya Pradesh Legislative Assembly
- Incumbent Sena Mahesh Patel
- Party: Indian National Congress
- Elected year: 2023
- Preceded by: Sulochana Rawat

Jobat is one of the 230 Vidhan Sabha (Legislative Assembly) constituencies of Madhya Pradesh state in central India. This constituency came into existence in 1951, as one of the 79 Vidhan Sabha constituencies of the erstwhile Madhya Bharat state. This constituency is reserved for the candidates belonging to the Scheduled tribes since its inception.

== Overview ==
Jobat (constituency number 192) is one of the two Vidhan Sabha constituencies located in Alirajpur district. This constituency covers the entire Bhavra tehsil, Jobat nagar panchayat and parts of Jobat and Alirajpur tehsils of this district.

Jobat is part of Ratlam Lok Sabha constituency along with seven other Vidhan Sabha segments, namely, Alirajpur in this district, Jhabua, Thandla and Petlawad in Jhabua district and Ratlam Rural, Ratlam City and Sailana in Ratlam district.

== Members of the Legislative Assembly ==
=== Madhya Bharat Legislative Assembly ===
Election	Member	Party
1952	Premsingh	Socialist Party

=== Madhya Pradesh Legislative Assembly ===
Election	Member	Party
1957	Ganga	Indian National Congress
1962	Raysinha	Socialist Party
1967	Ajmer Singh	Indian National Congress
1972	Ajmer Singh	Indian National Congress
1977	Ajmer Singh	Indian National Congress
1980	Ajmer Singh	Indian National Congress (Indira)
1985	Ajmer Singh	Indian National Congress
1990	Ajmer Singh	Indian National Congress
1993	Ajmer Singh	Indian National Congress
1998	Ajmer Singh	Indian National Congress
2003	Madhosingh Dawar	Bharatiya Janata Party
2008	Sulochana Rawat	Indian National Congress
2013	Madhosingh Dawar	Bharatiya Janata Party
2018	Kalawati Bhuria	Indian National Congress
2021^	Sulochana Rawat	Bharatiya Janata Party
2023	Sena Mahesh Patel	Indian National Congress

^ bypoll

== Election results ==
=== 2023 ===
2023 Madhya Pradesh Legislative Assembly election: Jobat
Party	Candidate	Votes	%	±%
INC	Sena Mahesh Patel	80,784	48.71	+15.18
BJP	Vishal Rawat	42,027	25.34	−6.7
Independent	Madhosingh Dawar	21,312	12.85	
Independent	Ajnar Surpal Singh	9,614	5.8	
Bhartiya Samajik Party	Mohansingh Ningwal	3,216	1.94	
Independent	Dawar Rinku Bala	2,527	1.52	
Independent	Dileep Singh Bhuriya	1,737	1.05	
NOTA	None of the above	4,643	2.8	−0.94
Majority		38,757	23.37	+21.88
Turnout		165,860	55.02	+2.31
INC gain from BJP		Swing		

=== 2021 ===
By-election, 2021: Jobat
Party	Candidate	Votes	%	±%
BJP	Sulochana Rawat	68,949	46.92	+14.92
INC	Mahesh Rawat	62,845	42.77	+8.77
NOTA	None of the Above	5,611	3.82	
BTP	Sardar Harmal Parmar	3,071	2.09	
Margin of victory		6,104		
Turnout		1,47,014	53.42	
BJP gain from INC		Swing		

=== 2018 ===
2018 Madhya Pradesh Legislative Assembly election: Jobat
Party	Candidate	Votes	%	±%
INC	Kalawati Bhuriya	46,067	33.53	
BJP	Madhosingh Dawar	44,011	32.04	
Independent	Vishal Rawat	31,229	22.73	
BSP	Madhu Singh Chouhan	2,699	1.96	
Independent	Chandrasingh Raiychand Bamaniya	2,649	1.93	
Independent	Vikram Singh Vasuniya	2,020	1.47	
Independent	Savesingh	1,821	1.33	
Independent	Mohansingh Ningwal	1,738	1.27	
NOTA	None of the above	5,139	3.74	
Majority		2,056	1.49	
Turnout		137,373	52.71	

== See also ==
- Jobat
- Ajay Kanesh
