= Sailana Assembly constituency =

Constituency of the Madhya Pradesh legislative assembly in India

Coordinates: 23.46°N 74.93°E

Sailana
- Constituency No. 221 for the Madhya Pradesh Legislative Assembly

Constituency details
- Country: India
- Region: Central India
- State: Madhya Pradesh
- District: Ratlam
- Lok Sabha constituency: Ratlam
- Established: 1951
- Reservation: ST

Member of Legislative Assembly
- 16th Madhya Pradesh Legislative Assembly
- Incumbent Kamleshwar Dodiyar
- Party: BAP
- Alliance: INDIA
- Elected year: 2023
- Preceded by: Harsh Vijay Gehlot

Sailana is one of the 230 Vidhan Sabha (Legislative Assembly) constituencies of Madhya Pradesh state in central India. This constituency came into existence in 1951 as one of the 79 Vidhan Sabha constituencies of the erstwhile Madhya Bharat state. It was abolished in 1956 but again came into existence in 1961. This constituency is reserved for the candidates belonging to the Scheduled tribes since its inception.

== Overview ==
Sailana (constituency number 221) is one of the 5 Vidhan Sabha constituencies located in Ratlam district. This constituency covers the entire Bajna and Sailana tehsils of this district.

Sailana is part of Ratlam Lok Sabha constituency along with seven other Vidhan Sabha segments, namely, Ratlam Rural and Ratlam City in this district, Alirajpur and Jobat in Alirajpur district and Jhabua, Thandla and Petlawad in Jhabua district.

== Members of the Legislative Assembly ==
Election	Name	Party
1962	Laxmansingh Jhitra	Socialist Party
1967	Prabhudayal Gehlot	Indian National Congress
1972	Prabhudayal Gehlot	Indian National Congress
1977	Kamji Gamira	Janata Party
1980	Prabhudayal Gehlot	Indian National Congress (Indira)
1985	Prabhudayal Gehlot	Indian National Congress
1990	Kamji Gamira	Janata Dal
1993	Lahling Devra	Indian National Congress
1998	Prabhudayal Gehlot	Independent politician
2003	Prabhudayal Gehlot	Indian National Congress
2008	Prabhudayal Gehlot	Indian National Congress
2013	Sangeeta Charel	Bharatiya Janata Party
2018	Harsh Vijay Gehlot	Indian National Congress
2023	Kamleshwar Dodiyar	Bharat Adivasi Party

== Election results ==
=== 2023 ===
2023 Madhya Pradesh Legislative Assembly election: Sailana
Party	Candidate	Votes	%	±%
BAP	Kamleshwar Dodiyar	71,219	37.36	New
INC	Harsh Vijay Gehlot	66,601	34.93	▼9.8
BJP	Sangeeta Charel	41,584	21.81	▼5.6
Independent	Suraj Bhabhar	2,404	1.26	▲0.33
NOTA	None of the above	2,580	1.35	▼0.76
Majority		4,618	2.43	▼14.89
Turnout		190,650	90.73	▲1.73
BAP gain from INC		Swing		

=== 2018 ===
2018 Madhya Pradesh Legislative Assembly election: Sailana
Party	Candidate	Votes	%	±%
INC	Harsh Vijay Gehlot "Guddu"	73,597	44.73	
BJP	Narayan Maida	45,099	27.41	
Independent	Kamleshwar Dodiyar	18,726	11.38	
Loktantrik Janta Dal	Vijay Hari Vijay	11,525	7.01	
SS	Kalusingh Bhabhar	2,704	1.64	
Independent	Pavan Charapota	2,455	1.49	
BSP	Jalam Sih Ninama	1,543	0.94	
Independent	Suraj Bhabhar	1,537	0.93	
NOTA	None of the above	3,477	2.11	
Majority		28,498	17.32	
Turnout		164,520	89.0	
INC gain from BJP		Swing		

== See also ==
- List of constituencies of Madhya Pradesh Vidhan Sabha
- Sailana
