= Alirajpur Assembly constituency =

Constituency of the Madhya Pradesh legislative assembly in India

Coordinates: 22.31°N 74.35°E

Alirajpur
- Constituency No. 191 for the Madhya Pradesh Legislative Assembly

Constituency details
- Country: India
- Region: Central India
- State: Madhya Pradesh
- District: Alirajpur
- Lok Sabha constituency: Ratlam
- Established: 1951
- Reservation: ST

Member of Legislative Assembly
- 16th Madhya Pradesh Legislative Assembly
- Incumbent Nagar Singh Chouhan
- Party: Bharatiya Janata Party
- Elected year: 2023
- Preceded by: Mukesh Rawat

Alirajpur is one of the 230 Vidhan Sabha (Legislative Assembly) constituencies of Madhya Pradesh state in central India. This constituency came into existence in 1951, as one of the 79 Vidhan Sabha constituencies of the erstwhile Madhya Bharat state. This constituency is reserved for the candidates belonging to the Scheduled tribes since its inception.

== Overview ==
Alirajpur (constituency number 191) is one of the two Vidhan Sabha constituencies located in Alirajpur district. This constituency covers the Alirajpur municipality and part of Alirajpur tehsil of this district.

Alirajpur is part of Ratlam Lok Sabha constituency along with seven other Vidhan Sabha segments, namely, Jobat in this district, Jhabua, Thandla and Petlawad in Jhabua district and Ratlam Rural, Ratlam City and Sailana in Ratlam district.

== Members of the Legislative Assembly ==
As a constituency of Madhya Bharat:

- 1951: Bhima, Socialist Party

As a constituency of Madhya Pradesh:

Election	Name	Party
1957	Chatrarsingh	Indian National Congress
1962	Bhagirath Bhanwar	Socialist Party
1967	Chatrarsingh	Indian National Congress
1972	Magan Singh Patel	Indian National Congress
1977	Bhagwan Singh Chauhan	Janata Party
1980	Magan Singh Patel	Indian National Congress (Indira)
1985	Magan Singh Patel	Indian National Congress
1990	Magan Singh Patel	Indian National Congress
1993	Magan Singh Patel	Indian National Congress
1998	Magan Singh Patel	Indian National Congress
1999*	Vesta Singh Patel (Rawat)	Indian National Congress
2003	Nagar Singh Chouhan	Bharatiya Janata Party
2008	Nagar Singh Chouhan	Bharatiya Janata Party
2013	Nagar Singh Chouhan	Bharatiya Janata Party
2018	Mukesh Rawat	Indian National Congress
2023	Nagar Singh Chouhan	Bharatiya Janata Party

*By-election

== Election results ==
=== 2023 ===
2023 Madhya Pradesh Legislative Assembly election: Alirajpur
Party	Candidate	Votes	%	±%
BJP	Nagar Singh Chouhan	83,764	44.63	+6.12
INC	Mukesh Patel	80,041	42.65	−9.95
Independent	Surendra Thakrala	11,361	6.05	
BSP	Patel Antar Singh	3,705	1.97	+0.25
Independent	Nawal Singh Mandloi	2,706	1.44	
Independent	Hirla Chouhan	2,275	1.21	
NOTA	None of the above	3,814	2.03	−1.08
Majority		3,723	1.98	−12.11
Turnout		187,666	70.85	+0.83
BJP gain from INC		Swing		

=== 2018 ===
2018 Madhya Pradesh Legislative Assembly election: Alirajpur
Party	Candidate	Votes	%	±%
INC	Mukesh Rawat	82,017	52.6	
BJP	Nagar Singh Chouhan	60,055	38.51	
Independent	Jalm Singh Patel	4,680	3.0	
BSP	Bhadiya Dawar	2,687	1.72	
Independent	Shamsher Singh Chouhan	1,654	1.06	
NOTA	None of the above	4,843	3.11	
Majority		21,962	14.09	
Turnout		155,936	70.02	
INC hold		Swing		

== See also ==
- Alirajpur
- Niranjan Singh Patel
