= Kalawati Bhuria =

Indian politician

Kalawati Bhuria (1972 – 24 April 2021) was an Indian politician and a tribal leader from Madhya Pradesh. She was an elected Member of the Legislative Assembly from Alirajpur district. She won the 2018 Madhya Pradesh Legislative Assembly election representing the Indian National Congress. She died due to COVID-19 on 24 April 2021 at the age of 49.

== Early life and education ==
Bhuria passed Class 10 in 2002 from Government Higher Secondary School, Meghnagar, through Madhya Pradesh Open School. She was married to Nagar Singh. She was a niece of former Union Minister Kantilal Bhuria.

== Career ==
Bhuria won from Jobat Assembly constituency, a reserved seat for the Scheduled Tribe community, representing the Indian National Congress in the 2018 Madhya Pradesh Legislative Assembly election. She polled 46,067 votes and defeated her nearest rival Madhosingh Dawar of the Bharatiya Janata Party by a margin of 2056 votes. Before entering the legislature, she was a four-time district panchayat president of Jhabua-Alirajpur (undivided) in the neighbouring Jhabua district.
