= 1952 Madhya Bharat Legislative Assembly election =

Indian state election

- 26 March 1952

All 99 seats in the Madhya Bharat Legislative Assembly 50 seats needed for a majority
- Registered: 5,723,673
- Turnout: 34.72%

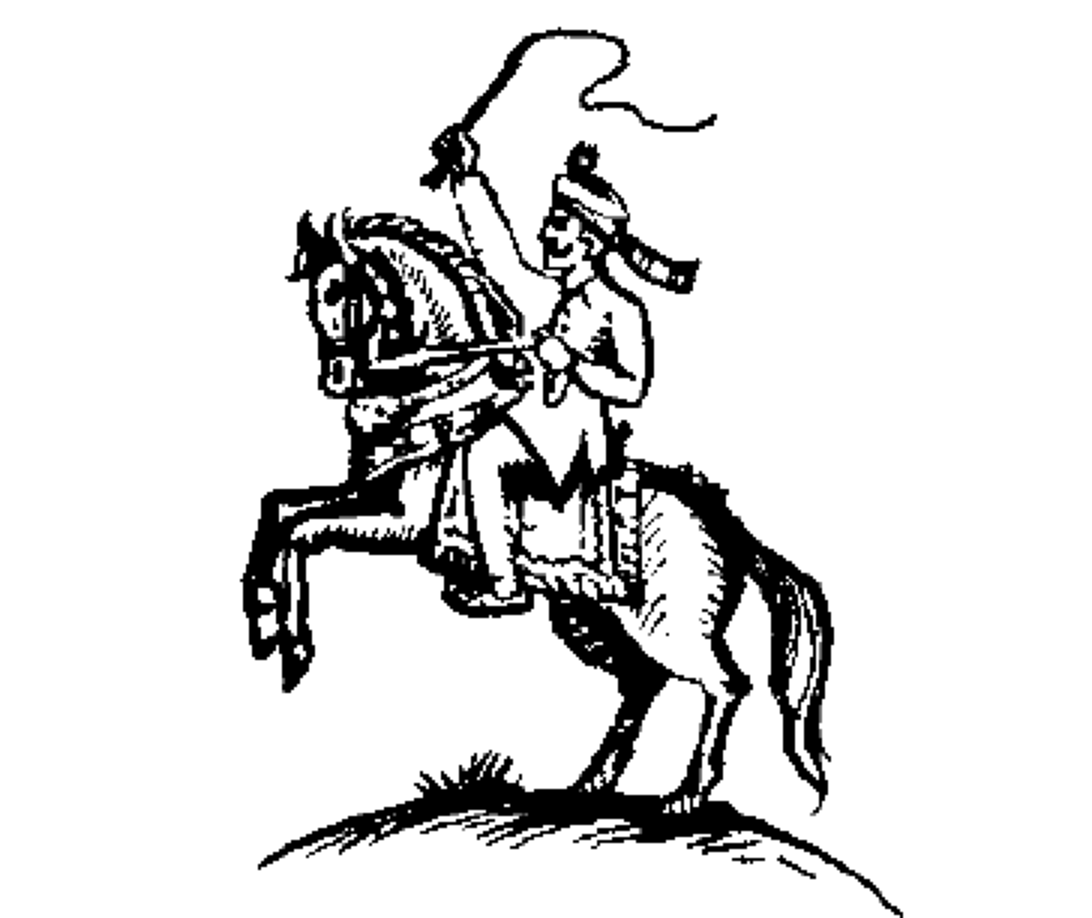
	First party	Second party
Leader	Mishrilal Gangwal
Party	INC	ABHM
Leader's seat	Bagli
Seats won	75	11
Popular vote	9,38,918	2,36,824
Percentage	47.24%	11.92%
Chief Minister of Madhya Bharat before election
Takhatmal Jain
Elected Chief Minister of Madhya Bharat
Mishrilal Gangwal
Indian National Congress

Indian administrative divisions, as of 1951

Elections to the Legislative Assembly of the Indian state of Madhya Bharat were held on 26 March 1952. 440 candidates contested for the 79 constituencies in the Assembly. There were 20 two-member constituencies and 59 single-member constituencies. The Indian National Congress won a majority of seats and Mishrilal Gangwal became the new Chief Minister.

== Results ==
Summary of results of the 1952 Madhya Bharat Legislative Assembly election
Political party	Flag	Seats Contested	Won	% of Seats	Votes	Vote %
Indian National Congress		99	75	75.76	9,38,918	47.24
Socialist Party		59	4	4.04	1,45,845	7.34
Bharatiya Jana Sangh		42	4	4.04	1,93,627	9.74
Akhil Bharatiya Ram Rajya Parishad		39	2	2.02	1,43,132	7.20
Akhil Bharatiya Hindu Mahasabha		33	11	11.11	2,36,824	11.92
Independent		131	3	3.03	2,58,157	12.99
Total seats		99	Voters	57,23,673	Turnout	19,87,410 (34.72%)

== Elected members ==
#	Constituency	Reserved for (SC/ST/None)	Member	Party
1	Barwani	ST	Partap Singh	Bharatiya Jana Sangh
2	Sendhwa	None	Ram Chandra	Bharatiya Jana Sangh
2	Sendhwa	None	Barku	Indian National Congress
3	Khargone	None	Khode Ramakant	Indian National Congress
3	Khargone	None	Mandloi Swaisingh	Indian National Congress
4	Bhikangaon	None	Vallabhdas Sitaram	Indian National Congress
5	Barwaha	None	Jadav Chand	Indian National Congress
5	Barwaha	None	Sitaram Sadhu	Indian National Congress
6	Rajpur	None	Hiralal	Bharatiya Jana Sangh
7	Manawar North	ST	Shivbhanu Galaji	Indian National Congress
8	Manawar South	ST	Bhume Kiratsingh	Hindu Mahasabha
9	Kukshi	ST	Ratu Singh	Indian National Congress
10	Alirajpur	ST	Bhima	Socialist Party
11	Jobat	ST	Premsingh	Socialist Party
12	Sardarpur	None	Shankar Lal	Indian National Congress
13	Jhabua	ST	Jamuna Bai	Socialist Party
14	Thandla	ST	Lal Singh	Socialist Party
15	Sailana	ST	Jeta Bhagga	Indian National Congress
16	Dhar Badnawar	None	Gopal Prashad	Indian National Congress
16	Dhar Badnawar	None	Jagannath	Indian National Congress
17	Mhow	None	Jal Rusramji Kavasji	Indian National Congress
18	Indore City A	None	Verma Ram Singh	Indian National Congress
19	Indore City B	None	V. V. Dravid	Indian National Congress
20	Indore City C	None	Manohar Singh Hullasmal	Indian National Congress
21	Indore City D	None	V. V. Sarwate	Indian National Congress
22	Depalpur	None	Sajjansingh Vishnar	Indian National Congress
22	Depalpur	None	Khadiwala Kanahiyalal	Indian National Congress
23	Ratlam Tehsil	None	Devisingh Surajmal	Indian National Congress
24	Ratlam City	None	Premsingh	Indian National Congress
25	Barnagar	None	Sawai Singh	Indian National Congress
26	Ujjain City	None	Vishwanath Vasudeo	Indian National Congress
27	Ujjain Tehsil	None	Durga Das	Indian National Congress
27	Ujjain Tehsil	None	Masood Ahmed	Indian National Congress
28	Kachraud Mahidpur	None	Ram Chandra	Indian National Congress
28	Kachraud Mahidpur	None	Bherulal	Indian National Congress
29	Alot	None	Kusumkant Jain	Indian National Congress
30	Jaora	None	Chaudhary Faizulla Alibaksh	Indian National Congress
31	Mandsaur South	None	Shyam Sukh	Indian National Congress
32	Sitamau	None	Sagar Dhaniram Harish Chandra	Indian National Congress
32	Sitamau	None	Chaudhari Bapulal Champalal	Indian National Congress
33	Bhanpura	None	Vimal Kumar Mannalal	Bharatiya Jana Sangh
34	Manasa	None	Ram Lal	Indian National Congress
35	Jawad	None	Badri Datt	Indian National Congress
36	Neemuch	None	Sita Ram Jajoo	Indian National Congress
37	Mandsaur North	None	Patidar Shyam Sunder	Indian National Congress
38	Agar	None	Sobhagmal Bapulal	Indian National Congress
39	Sasner	None	Rana Mal Singh	Indian National Congress
40	Tarana	None	Totla Rameshwar Dayal	Indian National Congress
41	Dewas	None	Patwardhan Anant Sadashiv	Indian National Congress
41	Dewas	None	Malviya Bapoo Krishna	Indian National Congress
42	Bagli	None	Mishrilal Gangwal	Indian National Congress
43	Khategaan	None	Kailash Chandra Giri	Hindu Mahasabha
44	Shajapur	None	Masoorkar Hari Laxman	Indian National Congress
44	Shajapur	None	Kishanlal Nagaji	Indian National Congress
45	Shujalpur	None	Gokhale Trimbak Sadashiv	Indian National Congress
46	Sonkatch	None	Vijaysingh Hira Singh	Indian National Congress
47	Narsingarh	None	Radha Vallabh	Indian National Congress
47	Narsingarh	None	Bhanwarlal Jivan	Indian National Congress
48	Khilchipur West	None	Prabhu Dayal	Indian National Congress
49	Khilchipur East	None	Raghuraj Singh	Independent
50	Rajgarh	None	Pratibha Devi	Indian National Congress
51	Biaora	None	Madan Lal	Independent
52	Chachaura	None	Dwarkadas Ramnarayan	Hindu Mahasabha
53	Raghogarh	None	Raja Balbhadra Singh	Independent
54	Bhilsa	None	Jamuna Prasad Mukharraya	Hindu Mahasabha
54	Bhilsa	None	Chaturbhuj Jatav	Hindu Mahasabha
55	Basoda	None	Niranjan Verma	Hindu Mahasabha
56	Kurwai	None	Ram Singh	Indian National Congress
57	Mungaoli	None	Kundanlal Madanlal	Indian National Congress
58	Pachhar	None	Ram Dayal Singh Raghuwanshi	Indian National Congress
58	Pachhar	None	Duli Chand	Indian National Congress
59	Guna	None	Tatke Sitaram	Indian National Congress
60	Shivpuri Kolaras	None	Tula Ram	Indian National Congress
60	Shivpuri Kolaras	None	Narhari Prashad	Indian National Congress
61	Pichhore South	None	Barjor Singh	Hindu Mahasabha
62	Pichhore North	None	Laxmi Narayan	Hindu Mahasabha
63	Karera	None	Bhagwan Dass	Hindu Mahasabha
64	Ghatigaon	None	Ghule Murlidhar Vishwanath Rao	Indian National Congress
65	Lashkar	None	Har Kishore	Hindu Mahasabha
66	Gwalior	None	Purshottam Rao Inamdar	Hindu Mahasabha
67	Morar	None	Pandviya Shyam Lal	Indian National Congress
68	Sheopur Pohri	None	Soma	Indian National Congress
68	Sheopur Pohri	None	Udaybhan Singh	Indian National Congress
69	Bijaypur	None	Balmukund	Indian National Congress
70	Sabalgarh	None	Laxmi Chand	Indian National Congress
71	Joura	None	Ram Chandra Mishra	Indian National Congress
72	Ambah	None	Jamuna Prasad Singh	Akhil Bharatiya Ram Rajya Parishad
72	Ambah	None	Chandana	Indian National Congress
73	Morena	None	Sowran Singh	Indian National Congress
73	Morena	None	Karan Singh	Indian National Congress
74	Gohad Mehgaon	None	Ram Dhan	Indian National Congress
74	Gohad Mehgaon	None	Prabhu	Indian National Congress
75	Pichhore Bhandair	None	Rudra Deo Lal	Indian National Congress
75	Pichhore Bhandair	None	Kishorilal Sukhram	Indian National Congress
76	Lahar	None	Har Sewak	Indian National Congress
76	Lahar	None	Gokul Prasad	Indian National Congress
77	Umri	None	Ranvijay Singh	Akhil Bharatiya Ram Rajya Parishad
78	Bhind	None	Narsingh Rao	Indian National Congress
79	Attair	None	Baboo Ram	Indian National Congress

== State Reorganization and Merger ==
On 1 November 1956, under States Reorganisation Act, 1956, All districts of Madhya Bharat, except the Sunel enclave of the Mandsaur district, was merged into Madhya Pradesh. The Sunel enclave of the Mandsaur district was merged in Rajasthan.

== See also ==
- Madhya Bharat
- 1951–52 elections in India
- 1952 Bhopal Legislative Assembly election
- 1952 Vindhya Pradesh Legislative Assembly election
- 1952 Madhya Pradesh Legislative Assembly election
- 1957 Madhya Pradesh Legislative Assembly election
