= Bhavra tehsil =

Bhavra
- Tehsil
- Location in Madhya Pradesh Bhavra (India)
- Coordinates: 22.530150°N 74.328746°E
- Country: India
- State: Madhya Pradesh
- District: Alirajpur district

Government
  - Type: Janpad Panchayat
  - Body: Council

Area
  - Total: 279.94 km^{2} (108.09 sq mi)

Population (2011)
  - Total: 91,101

Languages
  - Official: Hindi
- Time zone: UTC+5:30 (IST)
- Postal code (PIN): 457882
- Area code: 07394
- ISO 3166 code: MP-IN
- Vehicle registration: MP 69
- No. of Villages: 50
- Sex ratio: 1005

Bhavra tehsil is a fourth-order administrative and revenue division, a subdivision of third-order administrative and revenue division of Alirajpur district of Madhya Pradesh.

== Geography ==
Bhavra tehsil has an area of 279.94 sq kilometers. It is bounded by Gujrat in the north and northwest, Jhabua district in the east and northeast, Jobat tehsil in the south and southeast, Alirajpur tehsil in the west and southwest.

== See also ==
- Alirajpur district
