= Alirajpur tehsil =

Alirajpur
- Tehsil
- Location in Madhya Pradesh Alirajpur (India)
- Coordinates: 22.340343°N 74.499452°E
- Country: India
- State: Madhya Pradesh
- District: Alirajpur district

Government
  - Type: Janpad Panchayat
  - Body: Council

Area
  - Total: 626.69 km^{2} (241.97 sq mi)

Population (2011)
  - Total: 446,494

Languages
  - Official: Hindi
- Time zone: UTC+5:30 (IST)
- Postal code (PIN): 457887
- Area code: 07394
- ISO 3166 code: MP-IN
- Vehicle registration: MP 69

Alirajpur Tehsil is a fourth-order administrative and revenue division, a subdivision of third-order administrative and revenue division of Alirajpur district of Madhya Pradesh.

== Geography ==
Alirajpur tehsil has an area of 626.69 sq kilometers. It is bounded by Bhavra tehsil in the northeast, Jobat tehsil in the east, Dhar district in the southeast, Maharashtra in the south and Gujarat in the southwest, west, northwest and north.

== See also ==
- Alirajpur district
