= Anita Nagar Singh Chouhan =

Member of the Lok Sabha

Member of Parliament, Lok Sabha
- Incumbent
- Assumed office 4 June 2024
- Preceded by: Guman Singh Damor
- Constituency: Ratlam

Personal details
- Born: 5 September 1984 (age 41) Rampura, Madhya Pradesh, India
- Party: Bharatiya Janata Party
- Spouse: Nagar Singh Chauhan

Anita Nagar Singh Chouhan (Hindi pronunciation: [ən̪ɪt̪aː n̪aːgəɾ sɪŋgʱ t͡ʃɔːɦaːn̪]) is an Indian politician. She was elected to the Lok Sabha, lower house of the Parliament of India from Ratlam, Madhya Pradesh in the 2024 Indian general election as member of the Bharatiya Janata Party. She became the first women to win Ratlam (Lok Sabha constituency).

She defeated Kantilal Bhuria of Indian National Congress by 207232 votes.
