= Vikrant Bhuria =

Indian politician

President All India Adivasi Congress
- Incumbent
- Assumed office 11 February 2025
- Preceded by: Shivajirao Moghe

Member of the Madhya Pradesh Legislative Assembly
- Incumbent
- Assumed office 2023
- Preceded by: Kantilal Bhuria
- Constituency: Jhabua

Personal details
- Party: Indian National Congress

Vikrant Bhuria (born 1984) is an Indian politician from Madhya Pradesh. He is an MLA from Jhabua Assembly constituency, which is reserved for Scheduled Tribe community, in Jhabua District. He won the 2023 Madhya Pradesh Legislative Assembly election, representing the Indian National Congress.

== Early life and education ==
Bhuria is from Jhabua, Madhya Pradesh. He is the son of Kantilal Bhuria. He is a general surgeon and his wife is also a doctor. He completed his M.S. in 2011 at M.Y.H. Indore and earlier did his M.B.B.S. at Mahatma Gandhi Memorial Medical College, Indore.

== Career ==
Bhuria won from Jhabua Assembly constituency in the 2023 Madhya Pradesh Legislative Assembly election representing the Indian National Congress. He polled 103,151 votes and defeated his nearest rival, Bhanu Bhuriya of the Bharatiya Janata Party, by a margin of 15,693 votes. Earlier, he lost the 2018 Madhya Pradesh Legislative Assembly election to Guman Singh Damor of the BJP by a margin of 10,437 votes.
