= Nirmala Bhuria =

Indian politician

Cabinet Minister Madhya Pradesh Woman & Child Development
- Incumbent
- Assumed office 25 Dec 2023
- Preceded by: Valsingh Maida
- Constituency: Petlawad

Personal details
- Party: Bhartiya Janta Party
- Occupation: Politician

Nirmala Bhuria is minister of state for health in Government of Madhya Pradesh in India. She was elected to Madhya Pradesh Legislative Assembly from Petlawad in Jhabua district as a candidate of Bharatiya Janata Party for five times. Nirmala is daughter of veteran tribal leader Dilip Singh Bhuria.
