= Dhekal Badi =

Dhekal Badi ढेकल बड़ी
- Location in Madhya Pradesh, India
- Coordinates: 22.699°N 74.573°E
- Country: India
- State: Madhya Pradesh
- District: Jhabua district

Population (2011)
  - Total: 1,833

Language
  - Official: Hindi
- Time zone: UTC+5:30 (IST)

Dhekal Badi is a village in Madhya Pradesh state of India.
