= Sulochana Rawat =

Indian politician

Sulochana Rawat is an Indian politician who is serving as Member of 15th Madhya Pradesh Assembly from Jobat Assembly constituency. In 2021 by poll election in India, she won with the margin of 6,104 votes. On 3 October 2021, she left Indian National Congress and joined Bharatiya Janata Party along with her son.

== Personal life ==
She is 61 years old. She was born in Alirajpur district. She is married to Bachhu Singh Rawat and have two sons and three daughters. On 25 November 2022, she suffered from brain hemmorage in which the surgery was successful got out of danger. On 26 November 2022, she was shifted to hospital in Vadodara. On 15 December 2022, Shivraj Singh Chouhan, Chief Minister Of Madhya Pradesh reaches to her for enquires about her health.
