= Timeline of the 2019 Indian general election =

Indian lower house election timeline

This article outlines the key events leading up to the 2019 Indian general election which was scheduled to take place from 11 April to 19 May 2019, starting with the prior election in 2014.

== Pre poll ==
=== 2014 ===
- 7 April – 12 May 2014: The 2014 Indian general election was held along with the Legislative Assembly elections of Andhra Pradesh, Odisha, Arunachal Pradesh, and Sikkim.
- 16 May 2014: The Election results of the 2014 Indian general election were declared and the National Democratic Alliance, led by the Bharatiya Janata Party, won a majority with 336 seats out of 543.
  - Results of the Andhra Pradesh Legislative Assembly election were declared; the TDP received a majority in Andhra Pradesh and the TRS in Telangana.
  - Results of the Arunachal Pradesh Legislative Assembly election were declared; the INC winning a majority.
  - Results of the Odisha Legislative Assembly election were declared; the BJD winning a majority.
  - Results of the Sikkim Legislative Assembly election were declared; the SDF winning a majority.
- 18 May 2014: Nabam Tuki (INC) took oath as the 7th Chief Minister of Arunachal Pradesh.
- 21 May 2014: Naveen Patnaik (BJD) took oath as the 14th Chief Ministers of Odisha.
- 26 May 2014: Narendra Modi (BJP) became the 14th Prime Minister of India and was sworn in at the forecourts of the Rashtrapati Bhavan, Delhi.
- 2 June 2014: The state of Andhra Pradesh was split in two new states Telangana and Andhra Pradesh as per the Andhra Pradesh Reorganisation Act, 2014.
  - K. Chandrashekar Rao (TRS) took the oath as the 1st Chief Minister of Telangana.
- 3 June 2014: The sitting Minister of Rural Development, Gopinath Munde died in a car crash.
- 8 June 2014: Nara Chandrababu Naidu (TDP) took oath as the 13th Chief Minister of Andhra Pradesh.
- 10 July 2014: The 2014 Union budget of India was presented.
- 15 October 2014: The 2014 Maharashtra Legislative Assembly election was held.
  - The 2014 Haryana Legislative Assembly election was held.
- 19 October 2014: The results of Maharashtra Legislative Assembly election were declared with the BJP winning a plurality.
  - Results of Haryana Legislative Assembly election were declared with the BJP winning a majority.
- 26 October 2014: Manohar Lal Khattar (BJP) took oath as the 10th Chief Minister of Haryana.
- 31 October 2014: Devendra Fadnavis (BJP) took oath as the 18th Chief Minister of Maharashtra.
- 25 November – 20 December 2014: The 2014 Jammu and Kashmir Legislative Assembly election was held.
  - The 2014 Jharkhand Legislative Assembly election was held.
- 23 December 2014: The results of the Jammu and Kashmir Legislative Assembly election were declared; Jammu and Kashmir Peoples Democratic Party winning a plurality.
  - The results of Jharkhand Legislative Assembly election were declared with the BJP winning a majority.
- 28 December 2014: Raghubar Das (BJP) took oath as the 6th Chief Minister of Jharkhand.

=== 2015 ===
- 7 February 2015: The 2015 Delhi Legislative Assembly election was held.
- 10 February 2015: The results of the Delhi Legislative Assembly election were declared with the AAP winning a majority.
- 14 February 2015: Arvind Kejriwal (AAP) took oath as the 7th Chief Minister of Delhi.
- 1 March 2015: Mufti Mohammad Sayeed (PDP) took oath as the 8th Chief Minister of Jammu and Kashmir.
- 12 October – 5 November 2015: The 2015 Bihar Legislative Assembly election was held.
- 8 November 2015: The results of the Bihar Legislative Assembly election were declared with the RJD winning a plurality.
- 20 November 2015: Nitish Kumar (JDU) took oath as the 22nd Chief Minister of Bihar for the 4th time.
- 21 November 2015: A Jhabua-Ratlam Lok Sabha constituency by-election was held.
- 24 November 2015: The result of the Jhabua-Ratlam by-election was declared with the INC winning.

=== 2016 ===
- 7 January 2016: The Chief Minister of Jammu and Kashmir Mufti Mohammad Sayeed passed away. Governor's Rule was imposed in Jammu and Kashmir.
- 4 April 2016: Mehbooba Mufti (PDP) took oath as the 9th Chief Minister of Jammu and Kashmir.
- 4–11 April 2016: The 2016 Assam Legislative Assembly election was held.
- 4 April – 5 May 2016: 2016 West Bengal Legislative Assembly election were held.
- 16 May 2016: 2016 Kerala Legislative Assembly election were held.
  - 2016 Puducherry Legislative Assembly election were held.
  - 2016 Tamil Nadu Legislative Assembly election were held.
- 19 May 2016: Results of Assam Legislative Assembly election were declared; BJP getting plurality.
  - Results of West Bengal Legislative Assembly election were declared; AITC getting majority.
  - Results of Kerala Legislative Assembly election were declared; CPI(M) getting majority.
  - Results of Puducherry Legislative Assembly election were declared; INC getting majority.
  - Results of Tamil Nadu Legislative Assembly election were declared; AIADMK getting majority.
- 24 May 2016: Jayalalithaa (AIADMK) took oath as 6th Chief Minister of Tamil Nadu.
  - Sarbananda Sonowal (BJP) took oath as 14th Chief Minister of Assam.
- 25 May 2016: Pinarayi Vijayan (CPIM) took oath as 12th Chief minister of Kerala.
- 26 May 2016: Mamata Banerjee (AITC) took oath as 8th Chief Minister of West Bengal.
- 6 June 2016: V. Narayanasamy (INC) took oath as 10th Chief Minister of Puducherry.
- 5 December 2016: Sitting Chief Minister of Tamil Nadu Jayalalithaa died.
- 6 December 2016: O. Panneerselvam (AIADMK) took oath as 7th Chief Minister of Tamil Nadu.

=== 2017 ===
- 4 February 2017: 2017 Punjab Legislative Assembly election were held.
  - 2017 Goa Legislative Assembly election were held.
- 11 February – 9 March 2017: 2017 Uttar Pradesh Legislative Assembly election were held.
- 15 February 2017: 2017 Uttarakhand Legislative Assembly election were held.
  - O. Panneerselvam resigned as Chief Minister of Tamil Nadu.
- 16 February 2017: Edappadi K. Palaniswami (AIADMK) took oath as 8th Chief Minister of Tamil Nadu.
- 4–8 March 2017: 2017 Manipur Legislative Assembly election were held.
- 11 March 2017: Results of Punjab Legislative Assembly election were declared; INC getting majority.
  - Results of Goa Legislative Assembly election were declared; INC getting plurality.
  - Results of Manipur Legislative Assembly election were declared; INC getting plurality.
  - Results of Uttar Pradesh Legislative Assembly election were declared; BJP getting majority.
  - Results of Uttarakhand Legislative Assembly election were declared; BJP getting majority.
- 14 March 2017: Manohar Parrikar (BJP) took oath as 10th Chief Minister of Goa.
- 15 March 2017: N. Biren Singh (BJP) took oath as 12th Chief Minister of Manipur and Yumnam Joykumar Singh (NPP) as Deputy CM.
- 16 March 2017: Amarinder Singh (INC) took oath as 26th Chief Minister of Punjab.
- 18 March 2017: Trivendra Singh Rawat (BJP) took oath as 8th Chief Minister of Uttarakhand.
- 19 March 2017: Yogi Adityanath (BJP) took oath as 22nd Chief Minister of Uttar Pradesh and Keshav Prasad Maurya (BJP), Dr. Dinesh Sharma (BJP) as Deputy CM.
- 17 July 2017: 2017 Indian presidential election were held.
- 20 July 2017: BJP candidate Ram Nath Kovind won with a two-thirds majority by defeating INC candidate Meira Kumar in the presidential elections.
- 25 July 2017: Ram Nath Kovind (NDA) took oath as 17th President of India.
- 26 July 2017: Nitish Kumar resigned as Chief Minister of Bihar due to differences with the coalition partner, Rashtriya Janata Dal (RJD), following the naming of Tejashwi Yadav, the Deputy Chief Minister and RJD member, in a corruption-based First Information Report by the Central Bureau of Investigation.
- 27 July 2017: Nitish Kumar (JDU) took oath as 22nd Chief Minister of Bihar with the support of BJP. Sushil Kumar Modi (BJP) sworn in as Deputy CM.
- 5 August 2017: 2017 Indian vice-presidential election were held. NDA candidate Venkaiah Naidu won 516 votes out of 771 by defeating UPA candidate Gopalkrishna Gandhi.
- 11 August 2017: Venkaiah Naidu (NDA) sworn in as 13th Vice President of India.
- 21 August 2017: O. Panneerselvam (AIADMK) sworn is as 2nd Deputy CM of Tamil Nadu.
- 9 November 2017: 2017 Himachal Pradesh Legislative Assembly election were held.
- 9–14 December 2017: 2017 Gujarat Legislative Assembly election were held.
- 18 December 2017: Results of Himachal Pradesh Legislative Assembly election were declared; BJP getting majority.
  - Results of Gujarat Legislative Assembly election were declared; BJP getting majority.
- 22 December 2017: Vijay Rupani (BJP) took oath as 16th Chief Minister of Gujarat and Nitinbhai Patel (BJP) as Deputy CM.
- 27 December 2017: Jai Ram Thakur (BJP) took oath as 6th Chief Minister of Himachal Pradesh.

=== 2018 ===
- 18 February 2018: 2018 Tripura Legislative Assembly election were held.
- 27 February 2018: 2018 Meghalaya Legislative Assembly election were held.
  - 2018 Nagaland Legislative Assembly election were held.
- 3 March 2018: Results of Tripura Legislative Assembly election were declared; BJP getting majority.
  - Results of Meghalaya Legislative Assembly election were declared; INC getting plurality.
  - Results of Nagaland Legislative Assembly election were declared; NPF getting plurality.
- 6 March 2018: Conrad Sangma (NPP) sworn in as 12th Chief Minister of Meghalaya and Prestone Tynsong (NPP) as Deputy CM.
- 8 March 2018: Neiphiu Rio (NDPP) sworn in as 17th Chief Minister of Nagaland and Yanthungo Patton (BJP) as Deputy CM.
- 9 March 2018: Biplab Kumar Deb (BJP) sworn in as 10th Chief Minister of Tripura and Jishnu Deb Barman (BJP) as Deputy CM.
- 12 May 2018: 2018 Karnataka Legislative Assembly election were held.
- 15 May 2018: Results of Karnataka Legislative Assembly election were declared; BJP getting plurality.
- 17 May 2018: B. S. Yeddyurappa (BJP) sworn in as Chief Minister of Karnataka for 3rd time. (as minority government)
- 19 May 2018: BJP fails to prove majority in Legislative Assembly of Karnataka.
- 23 May 2018: H. D. Kumaraswamy (JDS) sworn in as Chief Minister of Karnataka with support of INC. G. Parameshwara (INC) sworned as Deputy CM.
- 12–20 November 2018: 2018 Chhattisgarh Legislative Assembly election were held.
- 28 November 2018: 2018 Madhya Pradesh Legislative Assembly election were held.
  - 2018 Mizoram Legislative Assembly election were held.
- 7 December 2018: 2018 Telangana Legislative Assembly election were held.
  - 2018 Rajasthan Legislative Assembly election were held.
- 11 December 2018: Results of Chhattisgarh Legislative Assembly election were declared; INC getting majority.
  - Results of Madhya Pradesh Legislative Assembly election were declared; INC getting plurality.
  - Results of Rajasthan Legislative Assembly election were declared; INC getting plurality.
  - Results of Mizoram Legislative Assembly election were declared; MNF getting majority.
  - Results of Telangana Legislative Assembly election were declared; TRS getting majority.
- 13 December 2018: K. Chandrashekar Rao (TRS) sworn in as Chief Minister of Telangana.
- 15 December 2018: Zoramthanga (MNF) sworn in as 5th Chief Minister of Mizoram.
- 17 December 2018: Kamal Nath (INC) sworn in as Chief Minister Of Madhya Pradesh.
  - Ashok Gehlot (INC) sworn in as Chief Minister of Rajasthan and Sachin Pilot (INC) as Deputy CM.
  - Bhupesh Baghel (INC) sworn in as 3rd Chief Minister of Chhattisgarh.

=== 2019 ===
- 17 March 2019: Sitting Chief Minister of Goa, Manohar Parrikar died after prolonged illness.
- 19 March 2019: Pramod Sawant (BJP) took oath as 13th Chief Minister of Goa and Vijai Sardesai (GFP) as Deputy CM.

== Electoral events ==
Electoral timelines are as below:

=== March 2019 ===
- 10 March 2019: The Election Commission of India announced election scheduled to the 17th Lok Sabha.
  - The Model Code of Conduct comes into force.
- 18 March 2019: Issue of notification for the 1st poll day.
- 19 March 2019: Issue of notification for the 2nd poll day.
- 25 March 2019: Last date for filing nominations for the 1st poll day.
- 26 March 2019: Last date for filing nominations for the 2nd poll day.
  - Scrutiny of nominations filed for the 1st poll day.
- 27 March 2019: Scrutiny of nominations filed for the 2nd poll day.
- 28 March 2019: Issue of notification for the 3rd poll day.
  - Last day for withdrawal of candidature filed for the 1st poll day.
- 29 March 2019: Last day for withdrawal of candidature filed for the 2nd poll day.

=== April 2019 ===
- 2 April 2019: Issue of notification for the 4th poll day.
- 3 April 2019: Indian National Congress released their manifesto titled Congress Will Deliver.
- 4 April 2019: Last date for filing nominations for the 3rd poll day.
- 5 April 2019: Scrutiny of nominations filed for the 3rd poll day.
- 8 April 2019: Bharatiya Janata Party released its manifesto titled Sankalpit Bharat, Sashakt Bharat.
  - Last day for withdrawal of candidature filed for the 3rd poll day.
- 9 April 2019: Last date for filing nominations for the 4th poll day.
- 10 April 2019: Issue of notification for the 5th poll day.
  - Scrutiny of nominations filed for the 4th poll day.
- 11 April 2019: Polling held at 91 parliamentary constituencies spanning over 20 states for the first poll day.
- 12 April 2019: Last day for withdrawal of candidature filed for the 4th poll day.
- 16 April 2019: Issue of notification for the 6th poll day.
- 18 April 2019: Polling held at 95 parliamentary constituencies spanning over 13 states for the second poll day. (Vellore constituency election cancelled due to illegal cash deposit from Dravida Munnetra Kazhagam candidate.)
  - Last date for filing nominations for the 5th poll day.
- 20 April 2019: Scrutiny of nominations filed for the 5th poll day.
- 22 April 2019: Issue of notification for the 7th poll day.
  - Last day for withdrawal of candidature filed for the 5th poll day.
- 23 April 2019: Polling held at 117 parliamentary constituencies spanning over 14 states for the third poll day.
  - Last date for filing nominations for the 6th poll day.
- 24 April 2019: Scrutiny of nominations filed for the 6th poll day.
- 26 April 2019: Last day for withdrawal of candidature filed for the 6th poll day.
- 29 April 2019: Polling held at 71 parliamentary constituencies spanning over 9 states for the fourth poll day.
  - Last date for filing nominations for the 7th poll day.
- 30 April 2019: Scrutiny of nominations filed for the 7th poll day.

=== May 2019 ===
- 2 May 2019: Last day for withdrawal of candidature filed for the 7th poll day.
- 6 May 2019: Polling held for 51 parliamentary constituencies in more than 7 states for the fifth polling day.
- 12 May 2019: Polling held for 59 parliamentary constituencies in more than 7 states the sixth polling day.
- 19 May 2019: Polling held at 59 parliamentary constituencies in more than 8 states the seventh polling day.
- 23 May 2019: Counting of votes and declaration of results for all polling days.

== Government formation ==
* 23 May 2019: PM Narendra Modi wins a second term with an overwhelming majority.

- 30 May 2019: PM Narendra Modi is sworn in as Prime Minister of India with 24 Cabinet Ministers, 9 MoS (Independent Charge) and 24 MoS.
