= Bhandakhapar =

Village in Madhya Pradesh, India

- Country: India
- State: Madhya Pradesh
- District: Alirajpur

Languages
- Time zone: UTC+5:30 (IST)

Bhandakhapar is a village in Alirajpur District of Madhya Pradesh, India.
