= 2015 Ratlam by-election =

The Ratlam Lok Sabha constituency by-election of 2015 was caused by the death from brain haemorrhage and myocardial infarction of the sitting Member of Parliament, Dileep Singh Bhuria of the Bharatiya Janata Party (BJP). The by-election was won by Kantilal Bhuria of the Indian National Congress (INC) by 88,800 votes.

BJP had won the seat, which is reserved for electoral candidates from the Scheduled Tribes, for the first time in the 2014 general election. Before then, the Lok Sabha constituency had been won by INC candidates, except in the 1977 general election when it went to a Praja Socialist Party representative. The constituency covers the districts of Jhabua, Alirajpur and Ratlam.

INC sent Kamal Nath and Jyotiraditya Scindia, among others, to campaign in the constituency. Among the BJP campaigners were the Chief Minister of Madhya Pradesh, Shivraj Singh Chouhan, and several Government of India cabinet ministers. Due to the significant tribal presence in the constituency, BJP also sent campaigners from that community.

During the campaign, in August 2015, the BJP announced that party workers would recite the Hindu devotional hymn Hanuman Chalisa near the polling booths. This caused opposition leaders to accuse the BJP of inciting religious polarisation but the BJP said it was just promoting cultural nationalism.

The BJP candidate was Nirmala Bhuria, the daughter of the deceased MP and herself a Member of the State Legislative Assembly for the Petlawad constituency in Madhya Pradesh. Vijay Haari was the candidate of Janata Dal (United). The Communist Party of India, Communist Party of India (Marxist), Gondwana Ganatantra Party, Rashtriya Samanta Dal and Bahujan Sangharsh Dal extended their support to his candidature.

The elections were held on 21 November 2015 and the result was declared on 24 November. Voter turnout was 62.46 per cent.
