= Petlawad explosion =

2015 disaster in Madhya Pradesh, India

2015 Petlawad explosion
- Date: 12 September 2015; 11 years ago
- Time: 08:30 IST (03:00 UTC)
- Location: Petlawad, Jhabua, Madhya Pradesh, India; 23°0′50″N 74°47′42″E
- Type: Explosions, building collapse
- Cause: Gas explosion, Gelignite explosion
- Deaths: 104
- Injuries: 150+
- Accused: Rajendra Kasawa

Location of Petlawad in Madhya Pradesh state

On the morning of 12 September 2015, an explosion in the town of Petlawad of the Jhabua district in the state of Madhya Pradesh of India killed 104 people. The cause of the explosion was attributed to illegally stored explosives that detonated, along with a cooking gas cylinder.

== Explosions ==
There were two explosions. Initially, it was suspected that the first explosion occurred in a crowded restaurant, triggering the second explosion where stored sticks of gelignite exploded in the warehouse. However, following further investigation, police believe the initial explosion was in the warehouse. The impact of the explosion damaged the building in which the restaurant was located as well as the building where the explosive material was located. The explosion also caused deaths at a crowded bus stop nearby.

The state police began performing autopsies on the bodies, while State Home Minister Babulal Gaur stated that an inquiry would be conducted. Chief Minister Shivraj Singh Chouhan announced compensation of ₹200,000 (about US$3,000) to the kin of the deceased and ₹50,000 (about US$750) to the injured.

The President of India, Pranab Mukherjee, expressed condolences in a message to Madhya Pradesh Governor Ram Naresh Yadav, while Prime Minister Narendra Modi expressed his grief over the deaths on Twitter.

== Investigation ==
In the course of their investigation, Madhya Pradesh Police found that Rajendra Kasawa rented space in the warehouse where the explosion occurred, and stored gelignite sticks there that triggered the blasts in the building. It is illegal to store those explosives in a residential area.

The Bharatiya Janata Party (BJP) linked Kasawa, the main accused, to former Union Minister Kantilal Bhuria's son Vikrant Bhuria. Meanwhile, the Indian National Congress party alleged that Kasawa was a Rashtriya Swayamsevak Sangh (RSS) activist. The Madhya Pradesh State Congress Committee released a poster stating that Kasawa's brother Narendra Kasawa had been identified as a member of Petlawad BJP Traders Cell. These allegations were dismissed by both the BJP and the RSS.

Kasawa was booked under Section 304A of the Indian Penal Code (IPC) and Section 34 of the Explosives Act. The deaths were registered under Section 174 of the Code of Criminal Procedure, 1973. Police sealed Kasawa's residence and the godowns (warehouses) owned by his brothers. More gelignite rods and blasting materials were found during the search. Rajendra Kasawa was later found to have died during the blast, as his DNA matched with the remains of one of the victims.
