= Dhekal Chhoti =

Dhekal Chhoti ढेकल छोटी
- Location in Madhya Pradesh, India
- Coordinates: 22.699°N 74.573°E
- Country: India
- State: Madhya Pradesh
- District: Jhabua district

Population (2011)
  - Total: 1,337

Language
  - Official: Hindi
- Time zone: UTC+5:30 (IST)

Dhekal Chhoti is a village in Madhya Pradesh state of India.
