= Agalgota =

Village in Madhya Pradesh, India

Coordinates: 22.3542°N 74.2557°E

- Location within India
- Country: India
- State: Madhya Pradesh
- District: Alirajpur

Languages
- Time zone: UTC+5:30 (IST)

Agalgota is a village in Katthiwada Tehsil, Alirajpur District, Madhya Pradesh. It has a population of 1,814 and 346 households. The total area is 765.59 hectares.

== History ==
The village of Agalgota is situated under Katthiwada Tehsil of Alirajpur District in the state of Madhya Pradesh. The Agalgota village is surrounded by Akola (3 km), Ambari (3 km), Guda (4 km), Mordhi (6 km) and Dungargaon (7 km). Hindi is the language followed in the village. Agalgota village is surrounded by cities of Dahod, Jhabua, Barwani, Rajgarh. Village has a literacy rate of 28.4%.
