= Sad, Jhabua =

Village in Madhya Pradesh, India

Sad साड़
- Location in Madhya Pradesh, India
- Coordinates: 22.830°N 74.727°E
- Country: India
- State: Madhya Pradesh
- District: Jhabua district

Population (2011)
  - Total: 2,857

Language
  - Official: Hindi
- Time zone: UTC+5:30 (IST)

Sad is a village in the Jhabua district of the state of Madhya Pradesh, India.
