= Nagar Singh Chouhan =

Indian politician (born 1978)

Nagar Singh Chouhan (born 1978) is an Indian politician from Madhya Pradesh. He is a four-time MLA from Alirajpur Assembly constituency, which is reserved for Scheduled Tribe community, in Alirajpur district. He won the 2023 Madhya Pradesh Legislative Assembly election, representing the Bharatiya Janata Party. He is currently Scheduled Caste Welfare Minister.

== Early life and education ==
Chouhan is from Alirajpur, Madhya Pradesh. He is the son of Bhuwan Chouhan. He completed his graduation in arts in 2013 at M. P. Bhoj Open University, Bhopal.

== Career ==
Chouhan won from the Alirajpur Assembly constituency in the 2023 Madhya Pradesh Legislative Assembly election representing the Bharatiya Janata Party. He polled 83,764 votes and defeated his nearest rival, Mukesh Patel of the Indian National Congress, by a margin of 3,723 votes. He was elected as an MLA for the first time winning the 2003 Madhya Pradesh Legislative Assembly election on BJP ticket from Alirajpur seat. Later, he retained the seat for two more terms for the BJP in the 2008 and 2013 Assembly elections. However, he lost the 2018 election to Mukesh Rawat of the Indian National Congress by a margin of 21,962 votes. But regained the seat for BJP in the 2023 election.
