= Mishrilal Gangwal =

Indian politician

- Born: 7 October 1902; Sonkatch, Indore State, British India
- Died: 4 September 1981 (aged 78); Indore, Madhya Pradesh, India
- Other names: "Bhaiyya" "Kaka saab" "Malwa ke Gandhi"
- Years active: 1925–1980
- Political party: Indian National Congress

Mishrilal Gangwal was an Indian politician from the state of Madhya Pradesh. He was the member of Indian National Congress party.

Mishrilal Gangwal was born on 7 October 1902 in Sonkatch, Dewas district, of Madhya Pradesh state to a Jain businessman from Indore, Balchand Gangwal. At the age of 14 he became the chairman of his school's (Shri Trilok Chandra Jain Higher Secondary School in Indore) student committee. In the year 1945 he was elected the President of Indore Rajya Prajamandal Adhiveshan.

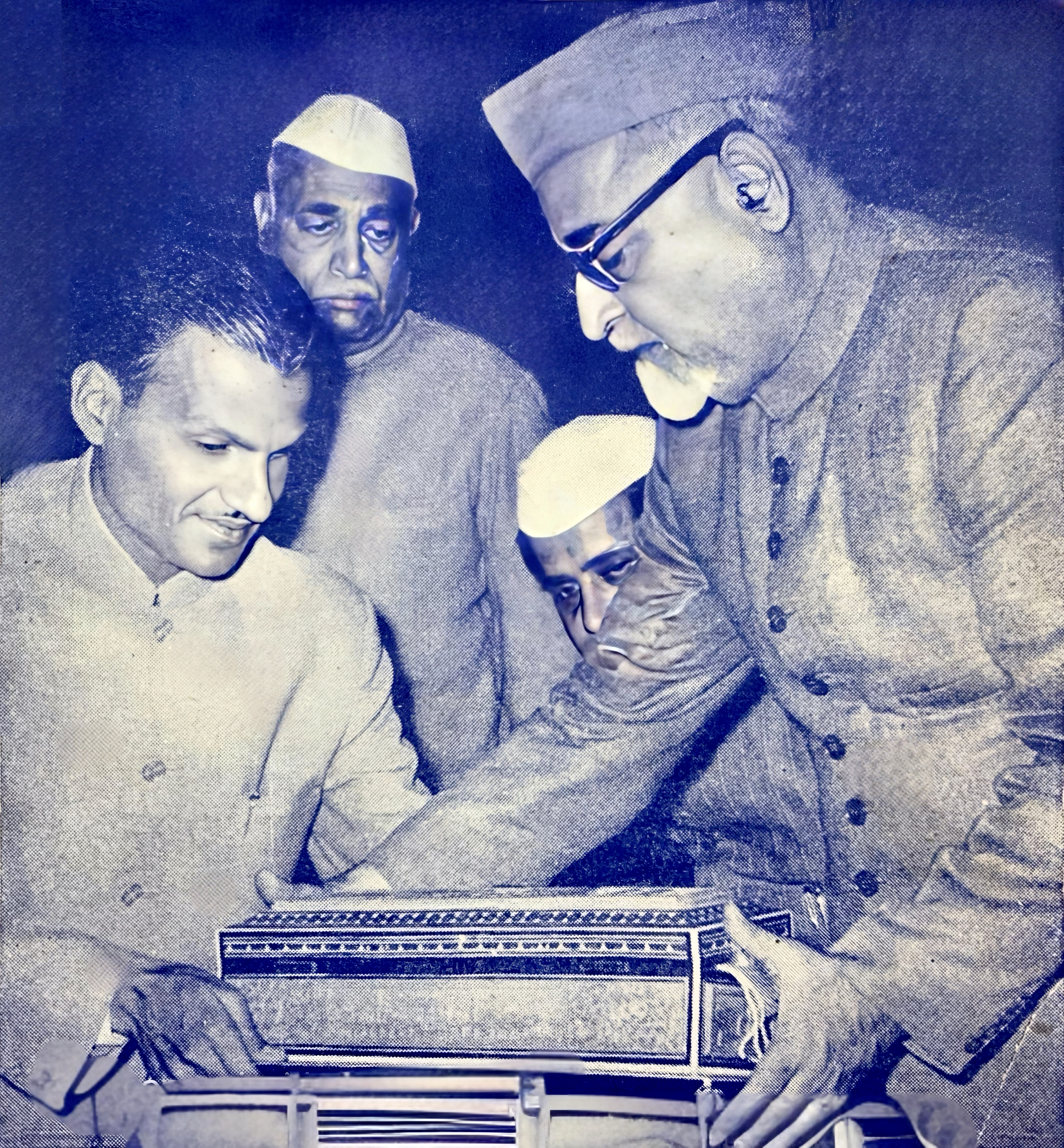
मिश्रीलाल गंगवाल के साथ जाकिर हुसैन और इंदौर में मंत्री Narayan Prasad Shukla

His interest in social work led him into politics. He joined Indian National Congress. He became an MLA representing Bagli Assembly constituency after the 1952 Madhya Bharat Legislative Assembly election. He was a former chief minister of Madhya Bharat state from 3 March 1952 and resigned from the post on 15 April 1955. In November 1956 he became Minister of Finance in the state of Madhya Pradesh. In the year 1959 he served as Minister for Finance, Separate Revenue, Economics & Statistics, and also served as Minister for Food & civil Supplies and had been Minister for several portfolios in later years in Madhya Pradesh government.

He was a member of the All India Congress Committee and the President of Ajmer-Marwara, Provincial Congress Committee. Shri Gangwal was also associated with Indore Rajya Prajamandal and many social and commercial bodies.

His son Narendra Gangwal, is a retired Assistant Commissioner (RTI) N.V.D.A. M.P. Govt. in 2008, started the Desh Bhakti Jagran Abhiyan movement.

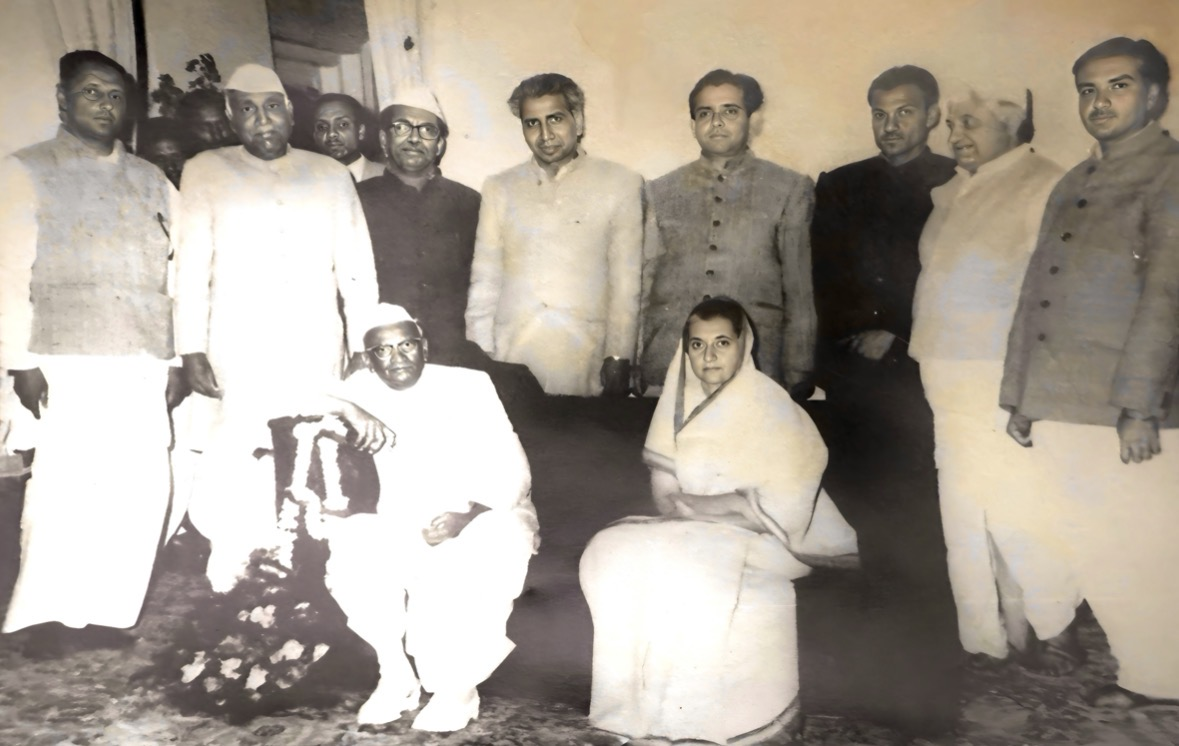
इंदिरा गांधी, जो उस समय भारत की प्रधानमंत्री थीं; Dwarka Prasad Mishra, जो मध्य प्रदेश के पूर्व मुख्यमंत्री थे; और Prakash Chandra Sethi, के साथ मिश्रीलाल गंगवाल, नारायण प्रसाद शुक्ला के आवास पर ।

One of Indore's bus stand is named after him as Gangwal Bus Stand.
