= Sena Mahesh Patel =

Indian politician

Member of the Madhya Pradesh Legislative Assembly
- Incumbent
- Assumed office 2023
- Constituency: Jobat

Personal details
- Born: 1976 (age 49–50) Alirajpur, Madhya Pradesh, India
- Party: Indian National Congress
- Education: Madhya Pradesh Bhoj Open University (BA)

Sena Mahesh Patel (born 1976) is an Indian politician from Madhya Pradesh. She is an MLA from Jobat Assembly constituency, which is reserved for Scheduled Tribe community, in Alirajpur District. She won the 2023 Madhya Pradesh Legislative Assembly election, representing the Indian National Congress.

== Early life and education ==
Patel is from Alirajpur, Madhya Pradesh. She is the wife of former MLA Mahesh Patel. She completed her BA in 2014 at M.P. Bhoj Open University, Bhopal.

== Career ==
Patel won from Jobat Assembly constituency in the 2023 Madhya Pradesh Legislative Assembly election representing the Indian National Congress. She polled 80,784 votes and defeated her nearest rival, Vishal Rawat of the Bharatiya Janata Party, by a margin of 38,757 votes.

In September 2024, Patel's son, Pushpraj, was charged with abetting the suicide of a 25-year-old woman. His father denied any charges and said that police acted in a haste. He was arrested in November 2024.
