= Sondwa =

Village in Madhya Pradesh, India

Coordinates: 22°06′51″N 74°22′28″E

Sondwa is a tehsil and large village in the Alirajpur District of Madhya Pradesh. Sondwa PIN code is 457888.

According to the 2011 Population Census, Sondwa village has population of 5145, 2494 of which are males, and 2651 females.
