= Ranapur =

- Town
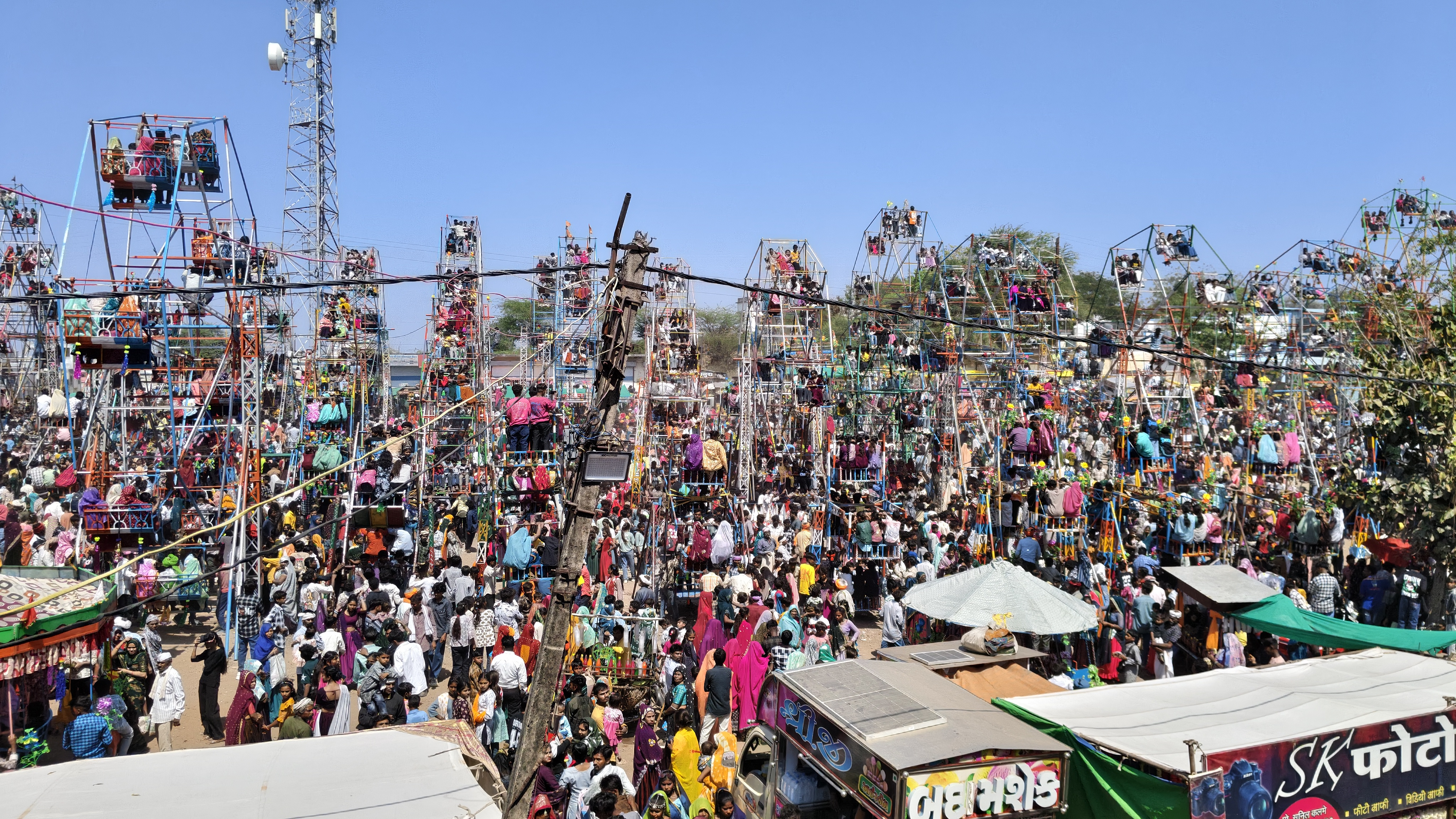
- Swings and crowds at Bhagoria Festival (Haat) at Ranapur

- Location in Madhya Pradesh, India Ranapur (India)
- Coordinates: 22.65°N 74.53°E
- Country: India
- State: Madhya Pradesh
- District: Jhabua
- Elevation: 370 m (1,210 ft)

Population (2001)
  - Total: 10,617

Languages
  - Official: Bhili, Hindi
- Time zone: UTC+5:30 (IST)
- Postal code: 457993
- ISO 3166 code: IN-MP
- Vehicle registration: MP-45

Ranapur is a town and a nagar panchayat in Jhabua district in the Indian state of Madhya Pradesh.

== Geography ==
Ranapur is located at 22.65°N 74.53°E. It has an average elevation of 370 metres (1,213 feet).

== Demographics ==
As of 2001 India census, Ranapur had a population of 11,617. Males constitute 52% of the population and females 6,245 and at present is 48%. Ranapur has an average literacy rate of 62%, higher than the national average of 59.5%: male literacy is 71%, and female literacy is 53%. In Ranapur, 16% of the population is under 6 years of age.
