= Jambukheda =

Village in Madhya Pradesh, India

- Country: India
- State: Madhya Pradesh
- District: Alirajpur

Languages
  - Official: Hindi
- Time zone: UTC+5:30 (IST)

Jambukheda is a village in Udaigarh Tehsil, Alirajpur District, Madhya Pradesh in India. The area of village is 512.57 hectares. Jambukheda has a total population of 1,296 people, with 639 males and 657 females. There are 208 houses in Jambukheda .

== History ==
Jambukheda village is surrounded by Bavdi Khurd - 4 km, Talawad - 4 km, Kana Kakad (-5 km, Udaigarh - 6 km and Thandla - 9 km villages. Hindi is the local language of the village.
