= Amar Singh Damar =

Indian politician (1925–1999)

Member of Parliament, Lok Sabha
- In office 1952–1962
- Succeeded by: Jamuna Devi
- Constituency: Jhabua, Madhya Pradesh

Personal details
- Born: 27 September 1925
- Died: 30 April 1999 (aged 73) Jhabua, Madhya Pradesh, India
- Party: Indian National Congress
- Spouse: Kamla

Amar Singh Damar (27 September 1925 – 30 April 1999) was an Indian politician. He was elected to the lower House of Parliament, the Lok Sabha, from Jhabua, Madhya Pradesh, India as a member of the Indian National Congress.

Damar died in Jhabua on 30 April 1999, at the age of 73.
