= Sunel =

Town in Rajasthan, India

- Town
- Location in Rajasthan, India Sunel (India)
- Country: India
- State: Rajasthan
- District: Jhalawar
- Elevation: 309 m (1,014 ft)

Population (2019)
  - Total: 25,000

Languages
  - Official: Hindi
- Time zone: UTC+5:30 (IST)
- PIN: 326513

Sunel is a town in Jhalawar district, Rajasthan, India, with a population of about 25000. It was formerly known as Ahilya Nagri. The Ahu River is 3 kilometres (2 mi) from Sunel.

== History ==
The town of Sunel is situated in the south-eastern region of Rajasthan, a region widely known as Malva, the land of malwas. The Malva is a region in the jhalawar district.

Sunel was merged on 1 November 1956. Reason for merging was that it was far from its then Bhanpura tehsil as well its then Mandsaur territory. Jhalawar state got rise as a result of a treaty between English rulers, Kota state, and Malwa state.

Nearby airports are at Kota (KHO, 92 miles), Indore (IDR, 123 miles), Gwalior (GWL, 151 miles), and Jaipur (JAI, 177 miles).

== Geography ==
Sunel is located at the border of Rajasthan and Madhya Pradesh, at 24.42°N 76.57°E. It has an average elevation of 1,013 feet (309 m).

Sunel's area is an expanse of fertile plain having rich black-cotton soil. It is watered by several rivers, giving it a verdant look.

=== Climate ===
The climate of the area is very similar to that of the Indo-Gangetic plain, with hot dry summers and cold winters. The monsoon is, however, quite unlike and very distinct from the oppressive humid climate of the North India plains. Sunel's district (Jhalawar district) is known for the highest rainfall in the Rajasthan state. An average of 35 inches of rainfall keeps it cool, and gentle breezes ward off the stifling humidity.

- Summer: 47.0 °C (max.), 32.5 °C (min.)
- Winter: 32.5 °C (max.), 9.5 °C (min.)
- Average rainfall : 943 mm (per year)
- Best season to travel : September - March

== Demographics ==
As of 2001 India census, Sunel had a population of 50,000. Males constituted 52% of the population and females 48%. Sunel had an average literacy rate of 61%, higher than the national average of 59.5%; with 62% of the males and 38% of females literate. 17% of the population was under 6 years of age.

== Economy ==
The economy is based on agriculture. This area is known for the highest rainfall in the Rajasthan state. The district also has a lot of irrigation dams, ponds, and medium scale projects, that serve the needs of farmers.

Jhalawar district is also known for the production of oranges. The area around Bhawani Mandi is an important place on the international and national citrus (naarangi) fruit map. Citrus fruits produced in Jhalawar region are of export quality, and are exported to various countries. The citrus-belt is spread around the Bhawani Mandi, Jhalawar and Pirawa sub-divisions.

Agricultural information:

- Total land area (irrigated): 60%
- Total land area (non-irrigated): 40%

Major crops of the region:

Kharif

- Soya bean
- Pulses
- Jowar
- Maize

Rabi

- Wheat
- Mustard
- Grain
- Coriander

== Education ==
Higher education:

- Government Higher Secondary School
- Govt Girls Higher Secondary School
- New Haidariya Sr. Sec. School
- Lakshya Secondary School Sunel
