= Thandla Assembly constituency =

Constituency of the Madhya Pradesh legislative assembly in India

Coordinates: 23.01°N 74.58°E

Thandla
- Constituency No. 194 for the Madhya Pradesh Legislative Assembly

Constituency details
- Country: India
- Region: Central India
- State: Madhya Pradesh
- District: Jhabua
- Lok Sabha constituency: Ratlam
- Established: 1972
- Reservation: ST

Member of Legislative Assembly
- 16th Madhya Pradesh Legislative Assembly
- Incumbent Veersingh Bhuriya
- Party: Indian National Congress
- Elected year: 2023
- Preceded by: Kalsingh Bhabar

Thandla is one of the 230 Vidhan Sabha (Legislative Assembly) constituencies of Madhya Pradesh state in central India. Thandla Assembly constituency is one of the three Assembly constituencies in Jhabua district. It comprises Thandla and Meghnagar tehsils, both in Jhabua district.

== Members of the Legislative Assembly ==
=== Madhya Bharat Legislative Assembly ===
Election	Member	Party
1952	Lal Singh	Socialist Party

=== Madhya Pradesh Legislative Assembly ===
Election	Member	Party
1957	Nathulal	Independent politician
1962	Pratap Sinha	Socialist Party
1967	Radusingh	Samyukta Socialist Party
1972	Mannaji	Samyukta Socialist Party
1977	Mannaji	Janata Party
1980	Kantilal Bhuriya	Indian National Congress (Indira)
1985	Kantilal Bhuriya	Indian National Congress
1990	Kantilal Bhuriya	Indian National Congress
1993	Kantilal Bhuriya	Indian National Congress
1998	Ratan Singh Bhabar	Indian National Congress
2003	Kal Singh Bhabar	Bharatiya Janata Party
2008	Veersingh Bhuriya	Indian National Congress
2013	Kal Singh Bhabar	Independent politician
2018	Veersingh Bhuriya	Indian National Congress
2023	Veersingh Bhuriya	Indian National Congress

== Election results ==
=== 2023 ===
2023 Madhya Pradesh Legislative Assembly election: Thandla
Party	Candidate	Votes	%	±%
INC	Veer Singh Bhuriya	105,197	45.45	−2.16
BJP	Kalsingh Bhabar	103,857	44.87	+12.75
BAP	Maju Damor	9,215	3.98	
JD(U)	Tolsingh Bhuriya	3,103	1.34	
BSP	Eliyas Bhai Machar	2,396	1.04	−0.07
NOTA	None of the above	3,108	1.34	−0.93
Majority		1,340	0.58	−14.91
Turnout		231,468	87.49	−0.01
INC hold		Swing		

=== 2018 ===
2018 Madhya Pradesh Legislative Assembly election: Thandla
Party	Candidate	Votes	%	±%
INC	Veer Singh Bhuriya	95,720	47.61	
BJP	Kalsingh Bhabar	64,569	32.12	
Independent	Dilipsingh Katara	26,052	12.96	
Independent	Iliyas Machar	3,539	1.76	
Independent	Narendra Muniya	2,588	1.29	
BSP	Smt. Ratani Katara	2,225	1.11	
NOTA	None of the above	4,568	2.27	
Majority		31,151	15.49	
Turnout		201,052	87.5	
INC gain from Independent		Swing		

== See also ==
- Thandla
