= Kathiwada =

Village in Madhya Pradesh, India

Coordinates: 22.4846793999°N 74.152789236°E

Kathiwada is a village and tehsil in Alirajpur district of Madhya Pradesh, India.

As of the 2011 population census, the village had a population of 2,333 of which 1,140 were males while 1,193 were females. The literacy rate was 87.06% compared to a 69.32% average in Madhya Pradesh. Male literacy stood at 93.03% while the female literacy rate was 81.44%.

Kathiwada has multiple tourist attractions, including the Noor Jahan, an unusual mango tree collection.
