= Mathuralal Damar =

Indian politician

Mathuralal Damar (born 1955) is an Indian politician from Madhya Pradesh. He is an MLA from Ratlam Rural Assembly constituency, which is reserved for Scheduled Tribe community, in Ratlam District. He won the 2023 Madhya Pradesh Legislative Assembly election, representing the Bharatiya Janata Party.

== Early life and education ==
Damar is from Ratlam, Madhya Pradesh. His father Natha Ji Damar was a farmer. He passed Class 5 and discontinued his studies while studying Class 6 at Government School in Birmaval.

== Career ==
Damar won from Ratlam Rural Assembly constituency in the 2023 Madhya Pradesh Legislative Assembly election representing the Bharatiya Janata Party. He polled 102,968 votes and defeated his nearest rival, Laxman Singh Dindor of the Indian National Congress, by a margin of 34,324 votes. He first became an MLA winning the 2013 Madhya Pradesh Legislative Assembly election representing the Bharatiya Janata Party from Ratlam Rural seat defeating Laxmi Devi Kharadi of the Indian National Congress by a margin of 26,969 votes.
