= Chetanya Kasyap =

Indian politician

Chetanya Kasyap (born 1959) is an Indian politician from Madhya Pradesh. He is a three time MLA from Ratlam City Assembly constituency in Ratlam District. He won the 2023 Madhya Pradesh Legislative Assembly election, representing Bharatiya Janata Party. he is currently micro, small enterprises minister.

== Early life and education ==
Kasyap is from Ratlam City, Madhya Pradesh. He is the son of Ashok Kumar Kashyap. He completed his Class 12 and later discontinued his studies in 1978 while doing his B.Com. second year at a college affiliated with Vikram University, Ujjain.

== Career ==
Kasyap won from Ratlam City Assembly constituency in the 2023 Madhya Pradesh Legislative Assembly election representing Bharatiya Janata Party. He polled 109,656 votes and defeated his nearest rival, Paras Dada of the Indian National Congress, by a margin of 60,708 votes. He became an MLA for the first time winning the 2013 Madhya Pradesh Legislative Assembly election representing Bharatiya Janata Party from Ratlam City. In 2013, he polled 76,184 votes and defeated his nearest rival, Adity Dawesar of the Indian National Congress, by a margin of 40,305 votes. He retained it in the 2018 Assembly election for BJP polling 91,986 votes. He defeated Manoj Malve of the Congress Party. He won again for a third consecutive term in the 2023 Assembly election.
