= Udaigarh =

Town in Madhya Pradesh, India

- Town
- Location in Madhya Pradesh, India
- Coordinates: 22.53°N 74.53°E
- Country: India
- State: Madhya Pradesh
- District: Alirajpur district

Udaigarh is a town and a Gram panchayat in the Alirajpur district of Madhya Pradesh, India. It's also a tehsil headquarter.

== Geography ==
Udaigarh is located at 22.53°N 74.53°E and it has an average elevation of 269 m (883 ft).

== Demographics ==
As per Census of India 2011, Udaigarh has a population of 4,027, with 1,909 males and 2,118 females.
