= Guman Singh Damor =

Member of the 17th Lok Sabha

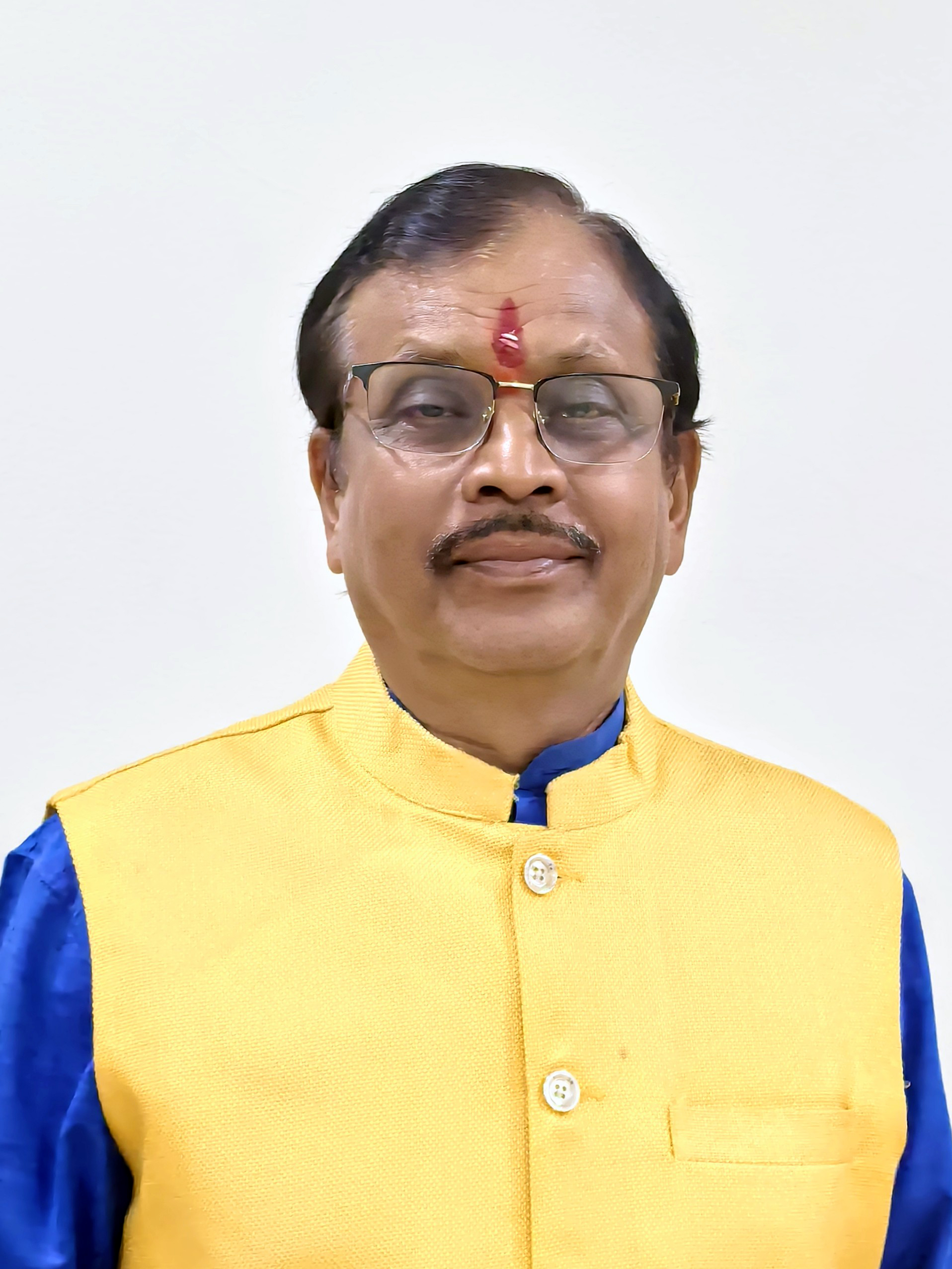

Member of Parliament, Lok Sabha
- In office 23 May 2019 – 4 June 2024
- Preceded by: Kantilal Bhuria
- Succeeded by: Anita Nagar Singh Chouhan
- Constituency: Ratlam

Member of Madhya Pradesh Legislative Assembly
- In office 2018-2019
- Preceded by: Shantilal Bilwal
- Succeeded by: Kantilal Bhuria
- Constituency: Jhabua

Personal details
- Born: 4 April 1957 (age 69) Umarkot, Jhabua, Madhya Pradesh
- Party: Bharatiya Janata Party
- Children: 4 (3 daughters, and 1 son)
- Profession: Politician

Guman Singh Damor (born 4 April 1957; Hindi pronunciation: [gʊmaːn̪ sɪŋgʱ ɖaːmoːɾ]) is an Indian politician. He was elected to the Lok Sabha, lower house of the Parliament of India from Ratlam, Madhya Pradesh in the 2019 Indian general election as member of the Bharatiya Janata Party. He was earlier an elected representative in Madhya Pradesh Legislative Assembly from the Jhabua constituency.
