= Kamleshwar Dodiyar =

Indian politician

Kamleshwar Dodiyar (born 1990) is an Indian politician from Madhya Pradesh. He is a member of the Madhya Pradesh Legislative Assembly from Sailana Assembly constituency, which is reserved for Scheduled Tribe community, in Ratlam district. He won the 2023 Madhya Pradesh Legislative Assembly election, representing the Bharat Adivasi Party. He is the only non-BJP and non-Congress MLA in the 16th Madhya Pradesh Assembly.

== Early life and education ==
Dodiyar is from Sailana, Ratlam district, Madhya Pradesh. His father Onkarlal Dodiyar is a farmer. He is pursuing L.L.M. in constitutional law from NLIU Bhopal and B.Com from IGNOU and completed his L.L.B. in 2023 at Delhi University, Delhi. Earlier, he did B.A. in 2013 at a college affiliated with Vikram University, Ujjain. His wife runs her own small business. He comes from a family of daily wage workers. He also worked as a labourer and tiffin delivery boy to fund his education. He was said to be inspired by Barack Obama, the former US president. He travelled to Vidhana Sabha in Bhopal on his motorcycle from his constituency after winning the election to attend his first session in the assembly.

== Career ==
Dodiyar is a first time MLA who won from Sailana Assembly constituency representing Bharat Adivasi Party in the 2023 Madhya Pradesh Legislative Assembly election. He polled 71,219 votes and defeated his nearest rival, Harsh Vijay Gehlot of the Indian National Congress, by a margin of 4,618 votes. He contested the 2018 Madhya Pradesh Legislative Assembly election from the same seat as an independent candidate but lost the poll, coming third to winner Harsh Vijay Gehlot of the Congress and Narayan Maida of BJP, who came second.
