= Petlawad =

Petlawad Petlawad
- Town
- Location in Madhya Pradesh, India Petlawad (India)
- Coordinates: 23°00′39″N 74°47′46″E
- Country: India
- State: Madhya Pradesh
- District: Jhabua
- Elevation: 388 m (1,273 ft)

Population (2011)
  - Total: 15,175

Languages
  - Official: Hindi
- Time zone: UTC+5:30 (IST)
- ISO 3166 code: IN-MP
- Vehicle registration: MP

Petlawad is a town and a Nagar Panchayat in the Jhabua district in the Indian state of Madhya Pradesh, formerly the Central Provinces. The town received nationwide media coverage on 12 September 2015 when an explosion killed approximately 100 people and injured over 150 people in the Petlawad explosion.

== Geography ==
Petlawad is a part of the Malwa region of Madhya Pradesh. It is 310.2 km from Bhopal and 147.9 km from Indore. Petlawad is located at 23.0°N 74.8°E. It has an average elevation of 388 metres (1,272 feet). Major towns in the region are Raipuria, Sarangi, Bamnia and Karwad.

== Demographics ==
In the 2011 census, Petlawad had a population of 15,174 of which 7,791 were males while 7,383 were females. The average sex ratio is 948 females for every 1000 males, which is higher than the Madhya Pradesh state average of 931. The literacy rate is 84% compared to 69.3% for Madhya Pradesh. The male literacy rate is 92.5% while the female literacy rate is 74.8%. Schedule Caste (SC) constitutes 7% of the population while Schedule Tribe is 24%.

== Economy ==
Agriculture is the main occupation of residents. The region is part of an important wheat-growing area of the country. Important crops are tomato, wheat, maize, soybean, groundnut, and garlic. Other than agriculture, cloth and jewelry selling is a common occupation in Petlawad.

== Culture ==
Petlawad is famous for its Adivasi (ethnic and tribal) traditions, owing to its location in the Jhabua district. The Nilkantheshwar temple is located in the town. Petlawad was selected for a residential-colony for the Mahi River dam project. The residential-colony is located 1.5 Kilometres from Petlawad.

== Transport ==
Bamnia railway station is situated 48 km (30 mi) from Ratlam Junction on Ratlam-Godhra section of Western Railways.Not many trains stop at Raoti stations except for few long distance and local trains. Station is 10 km (6.2 mi) away from the town, however transportation is generally available for commuters.

The nearest airport is indore.
