= Petlawad Assembly constituency =

Constituency of the Madhya Pradesh legislative assembly in India

Coordinates: 23.01°N 74.80°E

Petlawad
- Constituency No. 195 for the Madhya Pradesh Legislative Assembly

Constituency details
- Country: India
- Region: Central India
- State: Madhya Pradesh
- District: Jhabua
- Lok Sabha constituency: Ratlam
- Established: 1977
- Reservation: ST

Member of Legislative Assembly
- 16th Madhya Pradesh Legislative Assembly
- Incumbent Nirmala Bhuria
- Party: Bharatiya Janta Party
- Elected year: 2023
- Preceded by: Valsingh Maida

Petlawad is one of the 230 Vidhan Sabha (Legislative Assembly) constituencies in the state of Madhya Pradesh, central India. It is one of three Assembly constituencies located in Jhabua district.

== Members of the Legislative Assembly ==
Election	Name	Party
1967	V. Singh	Indian National Congress
1972	Dileep Singh	Indian National Congress
1977	Pratap Singh	Janata Party
1980	Gangabai	Indian National Congress (Indira)
1985	Gangabai	Indian National Congress
1990	Valsingh Maida	Indian National Congress
1993	Nirmala Bhuria	Bharatiya Janata Party
1998	Nirmala Bhuria	Bharatiya Janata Party
2003	Nirmala Bhuria	Bharatiya Janata Party
2008	Valsingh Maida	Bharatiya Janata Party
2013	Nirmala Bhuria	Bharatiya Janata Party
2018	Valsingh Maida	Indian National Congress
2023	Nirmala Bhuria	Bharatiya Janata Party

== Election results ==
=== 2023 ===
2023 Madhya Pradesh Legislative Assembly election: Petlawad
Party	Candidate	Votes	%	±%
BJP	Nirmala Bhuria	101,512	44.12	−0.27
INC	Valsingh Maida	95,865	41.67	−5.23
BAP	Balusingh Gamad	15,611	6.79	
AAP	Komalsinh Bapusinh Damor	7,440	3.23	+2.85
BSP	Ramchandra Javra Solanki	2,517	1.09	−0.25
NOTA	None of the above	3,562	1.55	−1.03
Majority		5,647	2.45	−0.06
Turnout		230,062	79.97	−0.49
BJP gain from INC		Swing		

=== 2018 ===
2018 Madhya Pradesh Legislative Assembly election: Petlawad
Party	Candidate	Votes	%	±%
INC	Maida Valsingh	93,425	46.9	
BJP	Valsingh Maida	88,425	44.39	
Independent	Sachin Babulal Gamad	6,579	3.3	
BSP	Ramchandra Solanki	2,675	1.34	
NOTA	None of the above	5,148	2.58	
Majority		5,000	2.51	
Turnout		199,204	80.46	
INC gain from BJP		Swing		

== See also ==
- RAMA Block is in petlawad
