= Ratlam Rural Assembly constituency =

Constituency of the Madhya Pradesh legislative assembly in India

Coordinates: 23.34°N 75.06°E

Ratlam Rural
- Constituency No. 219 for the Madhya Pradesh Legislative Assembly

Constituency details
- Country: India
- Region: Central India
- State: Madhya Pradesh
- District: Ratlam
- Lok Sabha constituency: Ratlam
- Established: 1977
- Reservation: ST

Member of Legislative Assembly
- 16th Madhya Pradesh Legislative Assembly
- Incumbent Mathuralal Damar
- Party: Bharatiya Janata Party
- Elected year: 2023
- Preceded by: Dilip Kumar Makwana

Ratlam Rural is one of the 230 Vidhan Sabha (Legislative Assembly) constituencies of Madhya Pradesh state in central India. The constituency is a segment of Ratlam (Lok Sabha constituency), and it lies in Ratlam district.

== Members of the Legislative Assembly ==
| Election | Name | Party |
|---|---|---|
| 1977 | Surajmal Jain | Janata Party |
| 1980 | Shantilal Aggarwal | Indian National Congress (Indira) |
| 1985 | Shantilal Aggarwal | Indian National Congress |
| 1990 | Motilal Dave | Indian National Congress |
| 1993 | Motilal Dave | Indian National Congress |
| 1998 | Motilal Dave | Indian National Congress |
| 2003 | Dhul Ji Choudhari | Bharatiya Janata Party |
| 2008 | Laxmi Devi Kharadi | Indian National Congress |
| 2013 | Mathuralal Damar | Bharatiya Janata Party |
| 2018 | Dilip Kumar Makwana | Bharatiya Janata Party |
| 2023 | Mathuralal Damar | Bharatiya Janata Party |

== Election results ==
=== 2023 ===
2023 Madhya Pradesh Legislative Assembly election: Ratlam Rural
| Party | Candidate | Votes | % | ±% |
|---|---|---|---|---|
| BJP | Mathuralal Damar | 102,968 | 55.83 | +6.53 |
| INC | Laxman Singh Dindor | 68,644 | 37.22 | −8.61 |
| Independent | Abhay Ohri | 8,562 | 4.64 | |
| NOTA | None of the above | 1,874 | 1.02 | −0.41 |
| Majority | | 34,324 | 18.61 | +15.14 |
| Turnout | | 184,441 | 86.47 | +1.04 |
| BJP hold | | Swing | | |

=== 2018 ===
2018 Madhya Pradesh Legislative Assembly election: Ratlam Rural
| Party | Candidate | Votes | % | ±% |
|---|---|---|---|---|
| BJP | Dilip Kumar Makwana | 79,806 | 49.3 | |
| INC | Thawarlal Bhuriya | 74,201 | 45.83 | |
| BSP | Kaluram Makwana | 2,149 | 1.33 | |
| NOTA | None of the above | 2,320 | 1.43 | |
| Majority | | 5,605 | 3.47 | |
| Turnout | | 161,893 | 85.43 | |
| BJP hold | | Swing | | |

=== 2013 ===
- Mathuralal Damar (BJP) : 77,367 votes
- Laxmi Devi Kharadi (INC) : 50,398

=== 1977 ===
- Surajmal Jain (Janata Party) : 19,738 votes
- Hariram Patidar (Congress) : 12,038

== See also ==
- Ratlam
