= Ratlam City Assembly constituency =

Constituency of the Madhya Pradesh legislative assembly in India

Coordinates: 23.34°N 75.04°E

Ratlam City
- Constituency No. 220 for the Madhya Pradesh Legislative Assembly

Constituency details
- Country: India
- Region: Central India
- State: Madhya Pradesh
- District: Ratlam
- Lok Sabha constituency: Ratlam
- Established: 1951
- Reservation: None

Member of Legislative Assembly
- 16th Madhya Pradesh Legislative Assembly
- Incumbent Chetanya Kasyap
- Party: Bharatiya Janata Party
- Elected year: 2023
- Preceded by: Paras Dada

Ratlam City Assembly constituency is one of the 230 constituencies of Madhya Pradesh Legislative Assembly. It is a segment of Ratlam Lok Sabha constituency, and lies in Ratlam district.

== Members of Vidhan Sabha ==
As part of Madhya Bharat Legislative Assembly :

| Election | Name | Party |
|---|---|---|
1952-1957 : Ratlam City
| 1952 | Premsingh | Indian National Congress |

As part of Madhya Pradesh Legislative Assembly :

| Election | Name | Party |
|---|---|---|
1957-1977 : Ratlam
| 1957 | Suman Jain | Indian National Congress |
| 1962 | Babulal Nathulal | Independent |
| 1967 | Devisingh | Indian National Congress |
| 1972 | Akbarali Arif | Indian National Congress |
1977-2008 : Ratlam Town
| 1977 | Himmat Kothari | Janata Party |
| 1980 | Himmat Kothari | Bharatiya Janata Party |
| 1985 | Himmat Kothari | Bharatiya Janata Party |
| 1990 | Himmat Kothari | Bharatiya Janata Party |
| 1993 | Shiv Kumar Jhalani | Indian National Congress |
| 1998 | Himmat Kothari | Bharatiya Janata Party |
| 2003 | Himmat Kothari | Bharatiya Janata Party |
2008 onwards : Ratlam City
| 2008 | Paras Dada | Independent |
| 2013 | Chetanya Kasyap | Bharatiya Janata Party |
| 2018 | Chetanya Kasyap | Bharatiya Janata Party |
| 2023 | Chetanya Kasyap | Bharatiya Janata Party |

== Election results ==
=== 2023 ===
2023 Madhya Pradesh Legislative Assembly election: Ratlam City
| Party | Candidate | Votes | % | ±% |
|---|---|---|---|---|
| BJP | Chetanya Kasyap | 109,656 | 67.83 | +4.17 |
| INC | Paras Dada | 48,948 | 30.28 | −3.32 |
| NOTA | None of the above | 1,367 | 0.85 | −0.21 |
| Majority | | 60,708 | 37.55 | +7.49 |
| Turnout | | 161,659 | 74.68 | +1.65 |
| BJP hold | | Swing | | |

=== 2018 ===
2018 Madhya Pradesh Legislative Assembly election: Ratlam City
| Party | Candidate | Votes | % | ±% |
|---|---|---|---|---|
| BJP | Chetanya Kasyap | 91,986 | 63.66 | |
| INC | Premlata Dave | 48,551 | 33.6 | |
| NOTA | None of the above | 1,529 | 1.06 | |
| Majority | | 43,435 | 30.06 | |
| Turnout | | 144,487 | 73.03 | |
| BJP gain from | | Swing | | |

=== 2013 ===
- Chetanya Kumar Kashyap (BJP) : 76,184 votes
- Smt Adity Dawesar (Congress) : 35,879
- Paras Dada (Ind.) : 14969

=== 2008 ===
- Paras Dada (Ind.) : 62,364 votes
- Himmat Kothari (BJP)
- Pramod Gugalia (Congress) : 4465

=== 1962 ===
- Babulal Nathulal (Ind.) : 16,476 votes
- Dr. Devi Singh Surajmal (INC) : 14704

== See also ==
- Ratlam
