= Jhabua Assembly constituency =

Constituency of the Madhya Pradesh legislative assembly in India

Coordinates: 22.77°N 74.59°E

Jhabua
- Constituency No. 193 for the Madhya Pradesh Legislative Assembly

Constituency details
- Country: India
- Region: Central India
- State: Madhya Pradesh
- District: Jhabua
- Lok Sabha constituency: Ratlam
- Established: 1972
- Reservation: ST

Member of Legislative Assembly
- 16th Madhya Pradesh Legislative Assembly
- Incumbent Vikrant Bhuria
- Party: Indian National Congress
- Elected year: 2023
- Preceded by: Kantilal Bhuria

Jhabua is one of the 230 Vidhan Sabha (Legislative Assembly) constituencies of Madhya Pradesh state in central India. Jhabua Assembly constituency is one of the three Assembly constituencies in Jhabua district. It is a segment of Ratlam (Lok Sabha constituency) .

== Members of the Legislative Assembly ==
=== Madhya Bharat Legislative Assembly ===
Election	Member	Party
1952	Jamuna Bai	Socialist Party

=== Madhya Pradesh Legislative Assembly ===
Election	Member	Party
1957	Sursingh	Indian National Congress
1962	Man Singh	Socialist Party
1967	Bapu Singh Damar	Indian National Congress
1972	Gangabai	Indian National Congress
1977	Bapu Singh Damar	Indian National Congress
1980	Bapu Singh Damar	Indian National Congress (Indira)
1985	Bapu Singh Damar	Indian National Congress
1990	Bapu Singh Damar	Indian National Congress
1993	Bapu Singh Damar	Indian National Congress
1998	Swaroop Bai Bhabar	Indian National Congress
2003	Pave Singh Pargi	Bharatiya Janata Party
2008	Jewier Meda	Indian National Congress
2013	Shantilal Bilwal	Bharatiya Janata Party
2018	Guman Singh Damor	Bharatiya Janata Party
2019^	Kantilal Bhuria	Indian National Congress
2023	Vikrant Bhuria	Indian National Congress

^ bypolls

== Election results ==
=== 2023 ===
2023 Madhya Pradesh Legislative Assembly election: Jhabua
Party	Candidate	Votes	%	±%
INC	Vikrant Bhuria	103,151	49.87	▼5.92
BJP	Bhanu Bhuria	87,458	42.29	▲2.63
BSP	Balu	3,636	1.76	
BAP	Gabbar Singh	2,938	1.42	
Independent	Dhansingh Bariya	2,555	1.24	
NOTA	None of the above	3,596	1.74	▼0.05
Majority		15,693	7.58	▼8.55
Turnout		206,829	66.22	▲1.05
INC hold		Swing		

=== 2019 bypoll ===
By-election, 2019: Jhabua
Party	Candidate	Votes	%	±%
INC	Kantilal Bhuria	96,155	55.79	▲23.91
BJP	Bhanu Bhuria	68,351	39.66	▲1.85
Independent	Kalyansingh Damor	2,488	1.44	
NOTA	None of the Above	3,088	1.79	▼1.72
Majority		27,804	16.13	
Turnout				
INC gain from BJP		Swing		

=== 2018 ===
2018 Madhya Pradesh Legislative Assembly election: Jhabua
Party	Candidate	Votes	%	±%
BJP	Gumansingh Damor	66,598	37.81	
INC	Dr. Vikrant Bhuriya	56,161	31.88	
Independent	Jevier Meda	35,943	20.4	
AAP	Dilipsingh Virsingh	2,802	1.59	
BSP	Balu Ninama	2,277	1.29	
Independent	Joseph Urph Ramsingh	2,263	1.28	
NOTA	None of the above	6,188	3.51	
Majority		10,437	5.93	
Turnout		176,151	65.17	

== See also ==
- Jhabua
