= Dileep Singh Bhuria =

Indian politician

Chairman of the National Commission for SC/ST

Member of Parliament for Ratlam

Personal details
- Born: 18 June 1944
- Died: 24 June 2015 (aged 71) Gurgaon, India
- Party: Bharatiya Janata Party

Dileep Singh Bhuria (18 June 1944 – 24 June 2015; Hindi pronunciation: [d̪ɪliːp sɪŋgʱ bʱuːɾɪjaː]) was a member of Lok Sabha of India. He was elected to Lok Sabha from Ratlam (Lok Sabha constituency) in Madhya Pradesh as member of Congress from 1980 to 1998. Later he joined Bharatiya Janata Party and won Ratlam seat as its candidate in 2014.

He died in Gurgaon on 24 June 2015 after suffering a second myocardial infarction.
