= Jobat =

- city
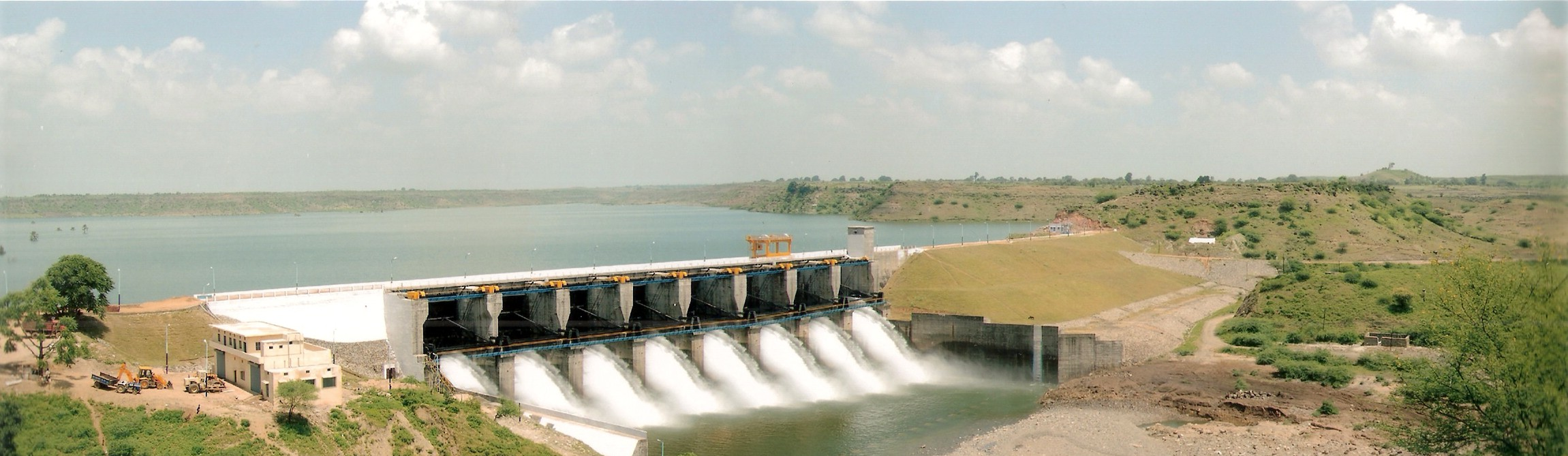
- View of Jobat dam

- Location in Madhya Pradesh, India Jobat (India)
- Coordinates: 22.42°N 74.57°E
- Country: India
- State: Madhya Pradesh
- District: Alirajpur
- Elevation: 292 m (958 ft)

Population (2011)
  - Total: 11,976
  - Density: 15/km^{2} (39/sq mi)

Languages
  - Official: Hindi
- Time zone: UTC+5:30 (IST)
- PIN: 457990
- Vehicle registration: mp69

Jobat is a city and a nagar parishad municipality in Alirajpur district in the Indian state of Madhya Pradesh.

== History ==
Jobat was a princely state of India, administratively under the Bhopawar Agency subdivision of the Central India Agency. The state covered an area of 339 square kilometres in 1901. Its Hindu rulers were styled "Rana" and succession was in the female line.

About a decade ago, Jobat was a small town which now has emerged as a city in Alirajpur district.

== Geography ==
Jobat is located at 22.42°N 74.57°E. It has an average elevation of 292 metres (958 feet).

Jobat is located on the banks of Dohi river. Jobat is about 184 km away from Indore. Jobat is located in Western Madhya Pradesh, close to the border of Gujarat.

== Demographics ==
As of 2001 India census, Jobat had a population of 9991. Males constitute 52% of the population and females 48%. Jobat has an average literacy rate of 72%, higher than the national average of 59.5%: male literacy is 79%, and female literacy is 64%. In Jobat, 16% of the population is under 6 years of age.

== See also ==
- List of railway stations in India
