= Kantilal Bhuria =

Indian politician

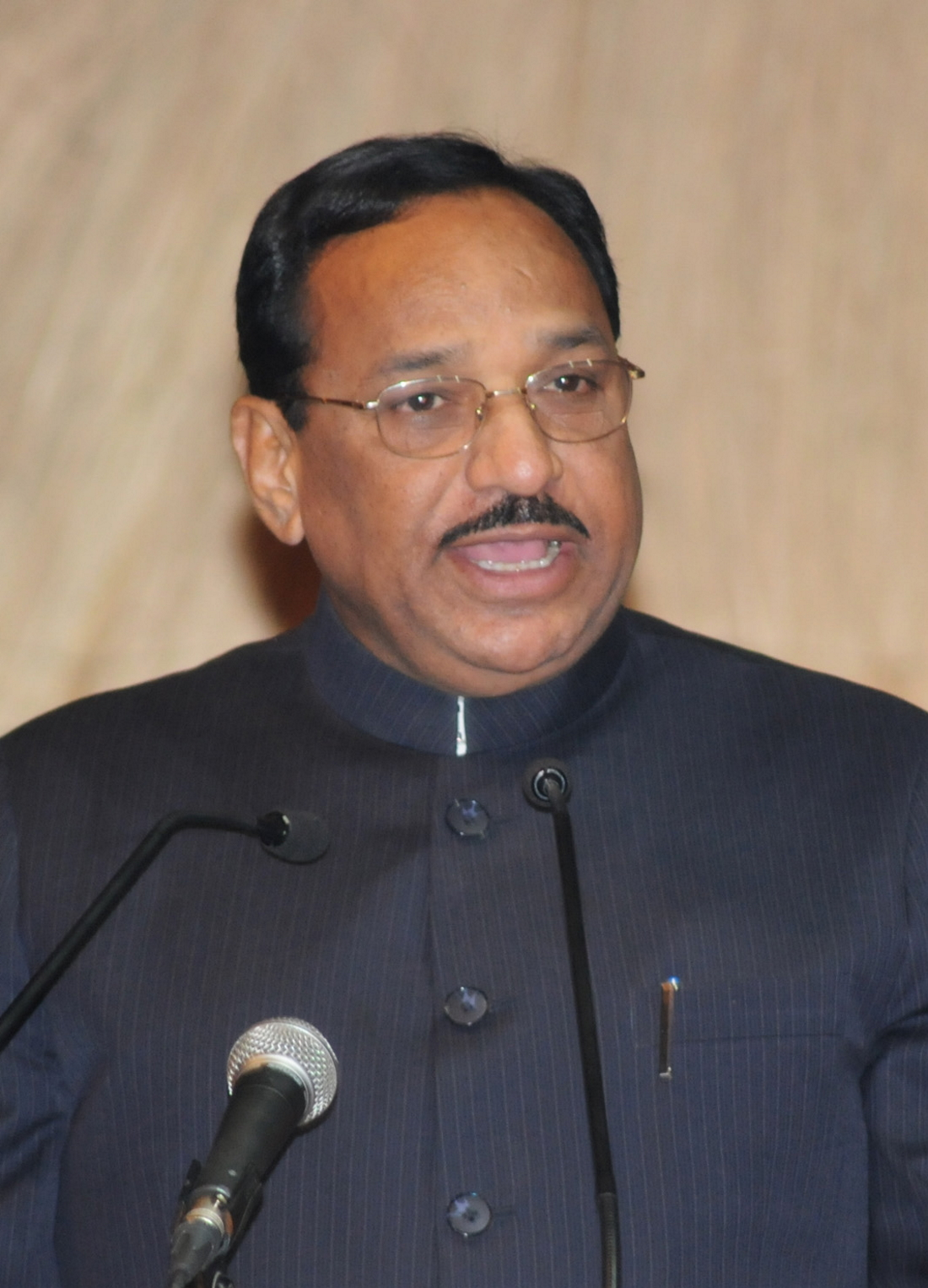

Union Minister of Tribal Affairs
- In office 28 May 2009 – 12 July 2011
- Prime Minister: Manmohan Singh
- Deputy: Tushar Amarsinh Chaudhary; Mahadeo Singh Khandela
- Preceded by: P. R. Kyndiah
- Succeeded by: Kishore Chandra Deo

Union Minister of State for Agriculture, Consumer Affairs, Food and Public Distribution
- In office 23 May 2004 – 22 May 2009 Serving with Akhilesh Prasad Singh and Mohammed Taslimuddin
- Prime Minister: Manmohan Singh
- Minister: Sharad Pawar

Member of Parliament, Lok Sabha
- In office 24 November 2015 – 23 May 2019
- Preceded by: Dileep Singh Bhuria
- Succeeded by: Guman Singh Damor
- Constituency: Ratlam
- In office 1998 – 16 May 2014
- Preceded by: Dileep Singh Bhuria
- Succeeded by: Dileep Singh Bhuria

Member, Madhya Pradesh Legislative Assembly
- In office 24 October 2019 – 3 December 2023
- Preceded by: Guman Singh Damor
- Succeeded by: Vikrant Bhuria
- Constituency: Jhabua

Personal details
- Born: 1 June 1950 (age 76) Jhabua, Madhya Bharat, India
- Party: Indian National Congress
- Spouse: Kalpana Bhuria
- Children: 2 sons Sandeep Bhuria; Vikrant Bhuria
- Parents: Nanu Ram Bhuria (father); Ladki Bai (mother)
- Education: M.A., LLB
- Alma mater: Chandrashekhar Azad College, Jhabua
- Profession: Politician
- As of 29 May, 2018

Kantilal Bhuria (born 1 June 1950; Hindi pronunciation: [kaːn̪t̪ɪlaːl bʱuːɾɪjaː]) is an Indian politician and a member of Indian National Congress and was till July 2011 the Minister of Tribal Affairs of the Republic of India. He had been promoted to the rank of cabinet minister in the United Progressive Alliance-2 government, led by the Prime Minister Manmohan Singh in 2009. Earlier, he was the Minister of State in the Ministry of Agriculture and Minister of State in the Ministry of Consumer Affairs, Food and Public Distribution. His successor, the new Minister of Tribal Affairs is V Kishore Chandra Deo, another Congressman.

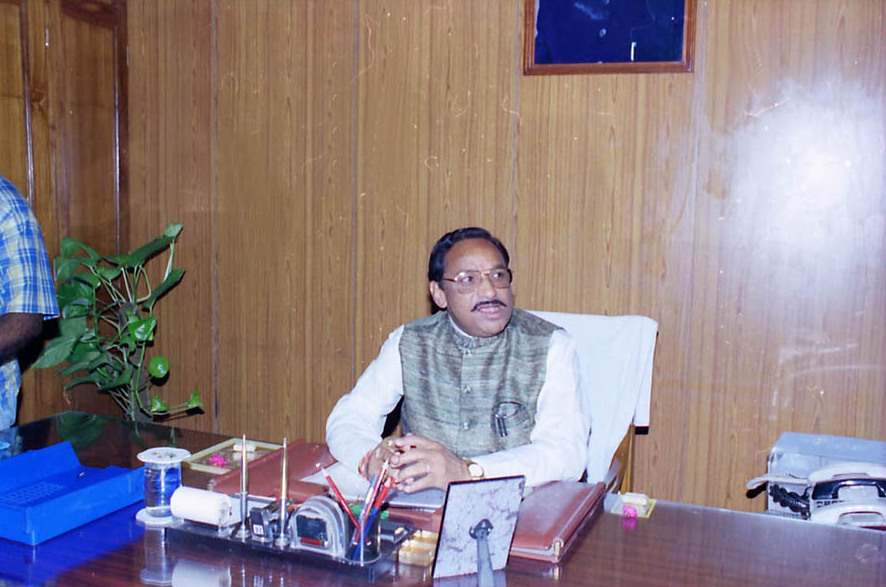
Kantilal Bhuria assumes the charge of the Union Minister for Agriculture and Food in New Delhi on May 25, 2004

== Political career ==
Bhuria was elected to the Lok Sabha in 1998, 1999 and 2004 from Jhabua constituency in Madhya Pradesh and in 2009 from Ratlam. And He was elected to the MP vidhan sabha in 1980, 1985, 1990 and 1993 from thandla constituency, He lost 2014 General Election from Ratlam but won the by-poll in 2015. He lost in 2019 General Election again, but was elected to Madhya Pradesh Vidhan Sabha later in 2019 when he won a by-poll in Jhabua (Vidhan Sabha constituency).

Political offices
| Preceded by Paty Ripple Kyndiah | Minister of Tribal Affairs; 29 May 2009 - 12 July 2011 | Succeeded by Kishore Chandra Deo |
