= Jhabua district =

Coordinates: 22.7667°N 74.6°E

- District of Madhya Pradesh
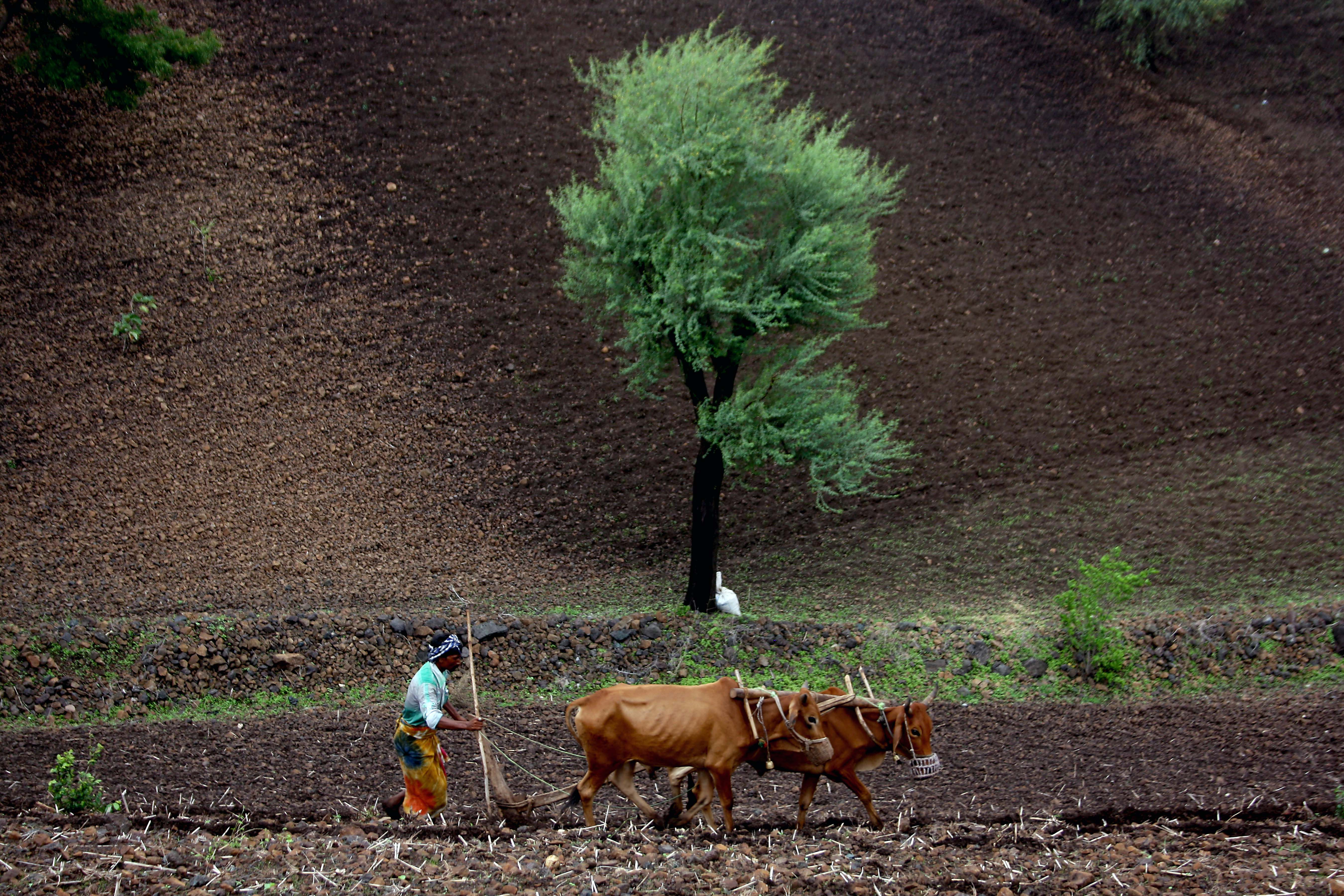
- Farmer in Jhabua district

- Location of Jhabua district in Madhya Pradesh
- Country: India
- State: Madhya Pradesh
- Division: Indore
- Named for: King Jhabbu Bhil
- Headquarters: Jhabua

Government
  - District collector: Rajani Singh (IAS)
  - Lok Sabha constituencies: Ratlam
  - Vidhan Sabha constituencies: Jhabua (193)

Area
  - Total: 3,782 km^{2} (1,460 sq mi)

Population (2011)
  - Total: 1,025,048
  - Density: 271.0/km^{2} (702.0/sq mi)

Demographics
  - Literacy: 44.45 per cent
  - Sex ratio: 989
- Time zone: UTC+05:30 (IST)
- Average annual precipitation: 800 mm
- Website: jhabua.nic.in

Jhabua district (Hindi pronunciation: [d͡ʒʱaːbʊaː]) is a district of Madhya Pradesh state in central India. The town of Jhabua is the administrative headquarters of the district.Jhabua district is located western part of Madhya Pradesh.

== Geography ==
Jhabua district lies in the western part of Madhya Pradesh. It is surrounded by Dahod and Chhota Udaipur districts of Gujarat, Banswara district of Rajasthan, and Alirajpur, Dhar and Ratlam districts of Madhya Pradesh.

It has an area of 3,782 km^{2}. The terrain is hilly and undulating. Average rainfall in the district is about 800 mm. The district is divided into five tehsils and six community development blocks.

Jhabua district was divided into two parts in May 2008, namely Alirajpur and Jhabua. Alirajpur, Jobat, Udaigarh, Bhabra, Sondawa and Kathiwada are the 6 blocks of new district, Alirajpur. Jhabua district now consists of Jhabua, Meghnagar, Ranapur, Rama, Thandla and Petlawad blocks.

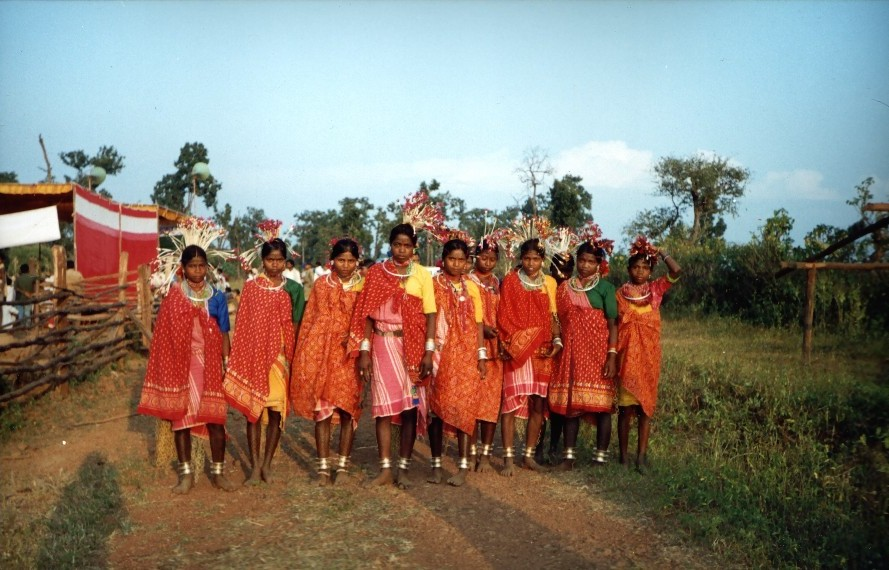
Bhil tribe girls in Jhabua district

== Economy ==
Jhabua's economy is primarily driven by agriculture and small-scale industries.

The district is highly drought-prone and degraded waste lands form the matrix of Jhabua. The women make ethnic items including bamboo products, dolls, bead-jewellery and other items that have for long decorated the living rooms all over the country. The men have for ages adorned "Teer-Kamthi", the bow and arrow, which has been their symbol of chivalry and self-defence.

Industrial area is located in Meghnagar of Jhabua, where many big industries are operational. It is multi-product Industrial Area, The major sectors in Meghnagar area are Chemical, Food processing & mineral units. Along with this, plant of Gail India Limited is also located in Jhabua.

In 2006 the Ministry of Panchayati Raj named Jhabua one of the country's 250 most backward districts (out of a total of 640). It is one of the 24 districts in Madhya Pradesh currently receiving funds from the Backward Regions Grant Fund Programme (BRGF).

== Demographics ==
Historical population
Year	Pop.	±% p.a.
1901	83,750	—
1911	116,878	+3.39%
1921	135,558	+1.49%
1931	158,464	+1.57%
1941	186,035	+1.62%
1951	207,418	+1.09%
1961	285,619	+3.25%
1971	374,686	+2.75%
1981	447,438	+1.79%
1991	646,924	+3.76%
2001	784,286	+1.94%
2011	1,025,048	+2.71%

Religions in Jhabua district (2011)
Religion	Percent
Hinduism	93.74%
Christianity	3.75%
Islam	1.53%
Jainism	0.87%
Other or not stated	0.11%

According to the 2011 census Jhabua District has a population of 1,025,048, roughly equal to the nation of Cyprus or the US state of Montana. This gives it a ranking of 440th in India (out of a total of 640). The district has a population density of 285 inhabitants per square kilometre (740/sq mi). Its population growth rate over the decade 2001–2011 was 30.58%. Jhabua has a sex ratio of 989 females for every 1000 males, and a literacy rate of 44.45%. 8.97% of the population lives in urban areas. Scheduled Castes and Tribes made up 1.70% and 87.00% of the population respectively.

As per the 2001 census Jhabua district (considering the separation of Alirajpur) had a total population of 784,286, out of which 396,141 were males and 388,145 were females. 91 per cent of the population was rural. 85.60 per cent of the population was tribal and 3 per cent belonged to scheduled castes. Before the separation of Alirajpur, Jhabua district had a sex ratio of 990 and density of population stood at 206 / km^{2}.

Jhabua is a predominantly Adivasi district, and suffers from high rates of illiteracy and poverty. Almost half of the population lives below the poverty line. The Bhil and Bhilala peoples inhabit the interior of the district. More than 85% of the population speak different Bhili dialects.

=== Languages ===
Languages of Jhabua district (2011)
1. Bhili (82.2%)
2. Hindi (9.37%)
3. Malvi (3.45%)
4. Bhilali (2.40%)
5. Others (2.59%)

At the time of the 2011 Census of India, 82.19% of the population in the district spoke Bhili, 9.37% Hindi, 3.45% Malvi and 2.40% Bhilali as their first language.

Languages spoken include Rathwi Bareli, a Bhil language with approximately 64 000 speakers, written in the Devanagari script; and Bhilali, with 1 150 000 speakers.

== Literacy ==
According to 2001 census, with a literacy rate 36.9 per cent Jhabua district had the lowest literacy rate amongst districts of Madhya Pradesh. In 2011 this had increased only marginally to 43.3%.

== Tehsil and Block's ==
- Jhabua
- Thandla
- Petlawad
- Meghnagar
- Ranapur
- Ramaa

== Culture ==
A small village of 320 people in 1971, Deojhiri is 8 km north-east of Jhabua on the Ahmedabad-Indore State Highway No.22. It is at a distance of 1 km on the western side of the road, on the Sunar river. As the name of the village denotes there is an ancient temple and (Jhiri) or a perennial spring. The spring has been built up into a Kund. A festival is held on Vaisakh Purnima, which falls mostly in the month of April according to the Gregorian calendar. Katthivada in Jhabua district is noted for its large mangoes.

== Tourist places ==
- Devjhiri, Jhabua - Devjhiri is a natural pond which is full of water all the time, there are many temples here where people go to visit.
- Rajwara, Jhabua - Rajwada is a prominent place of Jhabua which is situated in the center of the city, in olden times people of the royal family used to reside here.
- Hanuman Tekri - Situated on a high hill in Jhabua city, this temple is an important place of devotion and peace.

== Transportation ==
Ratlam Vadodara Railway Line passing through Jhabua district. Major railway station in Jhabua district is :-

- Meghnagar railway station
- Bamnia railway station
- Thandla Road railway station

== See also ==
- Petlawad explosion
- Sad, Jhabua
