= Alirajpur district =

- District
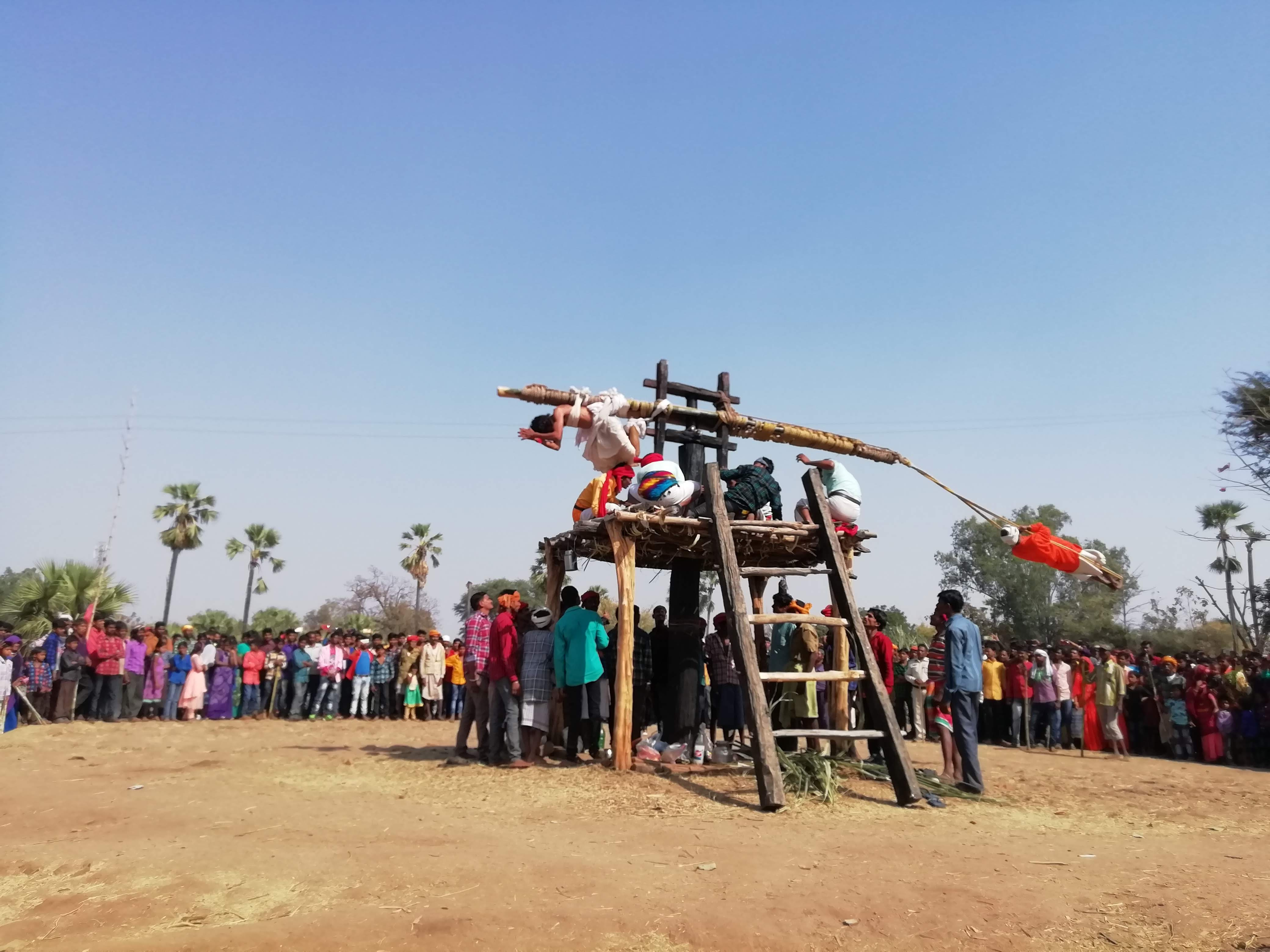
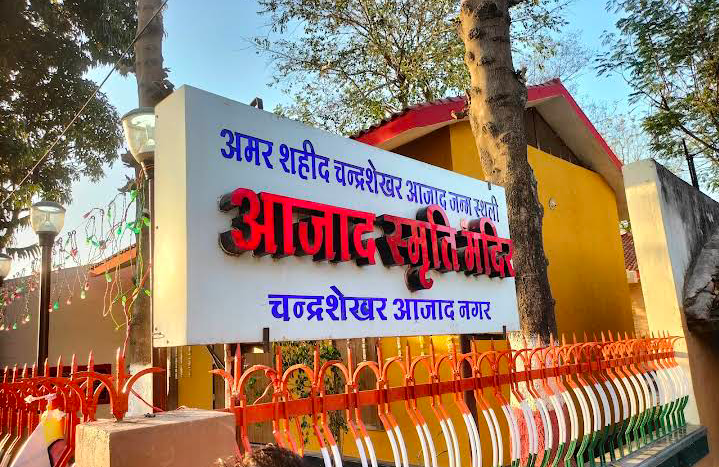
- Top:Traditional Bhil fair in Alirajpur; Bottem:Bhavara Town

- Location of Alirajpur district in Madhya Pradesh
- Coordinates (Alirajpur): 22°18′18″N 74°21′36″E
- Country: India
- State: Madhya Pradesh
- Division: Indore
- Headquarters: Alirajpur

Government
  - District Magistrate: Shri Raghvendra Singh
  - Lok Sabha constituencies: Ratlam
  - Vidhan Sabha constituencies: 1. Alirajpur, 2. Jobat

Area
  - Total: 3,182 km^{2} (1,229 sq mi)

Population (2011)
  - Total: 728,677
  - Density: 229.0/km^{2} (593.1/sq mi)

Demographics
  - Literacy: 37.22 per cent
  - Sex ratio: 1009
- Time zone: UTC+05:30 (IST)
- Website: alirajpur.nic.in

Alirajpur district (Hindi pronunciation: [əliːɾaːd͡ʒpʊɾ]) is one of the 55 districts of Madhya Pradesh state in India. It was created from Alirajpur, Jobat and Bhabra tehsils of the former Jhabua district on 17 May 2008. Alirajpur district is located western part of Madhya Pradesh.It is the least literate district in India as per Census 2011. Alirajpur is the administrative headquarters of the district. The district occupies an area of 2,165.24 square kilometres (836.00 sq mi), and at the 2011 census had a population of 728,999. It includes the city of Alirajpur.

== Origin of name ==
The district is named after its headquarters, Alirajpur, which was the capital of the former princely state of Ali Rajpur. The name of this town is derived by conjoining Ali (the fortress town and the former capital of the princely state founded by Anand Deo in 1437) and Rajpur (the latter capital). According to the 2011 census Alirajpur district has a population of 728,677, roughly equal to the nation of Bhutan or the US state of Alaska. This gives it a ranking of 498th in India (out of a total of 640). The district has a population density of 229 inhabitants per square kilometre (590/sq mi). Its population growth rate over the decade 2001–2011 was 19.4 per cent. Alirajpur has a sex ratio of 1,009 females for every 1,000 males, and a literacy rate of 37.22 per cent, the lowest in India.

== Divisions ==
This district comprises Six tehsils and Development Blocks : Alirajpur, Jobat, Sondwa, Udaigarh, Chandra Sekhra Ajad Nagar and Kathiwada.

Presently, there are two Madhya Pradesh Vidhan Sabha constituencies in this district: Alirajpur and Jobat. Both of these are part of Ratlam Lok Sabha constituency.

== Demographics ==
Historical population
Year	Pop.	±% p.a.
1901	70,763	—
1911	98,753	+3.39%
1921	114,538	+1.49%
1931	133,892	+1.57%
1941	157,188	+1.62%
1951	175,255	+1.09%
1961	228,765	+2.70%
1971	293,125	+2.51%
1981	347,730	+1.72%
1991	483,481	+3.35%
2001	610,275	+2.36%
2011	728,999	+1.79%

Religions in Alirajpur district (2011)
Religion	Percent
Hinduism	96.72%
Islam	2.42%
Christianity	0.63%
Other or not stated	0.23%

According to the 2011 census Alirajpur district has a population of 728,999, roughly equal to the nation of Bhutan or the US state of Alaska. This gives it a ranking of 498th in India (out of a total of 640). The district has a population density of 229 inhabitants per square kilometre (590/sq mi). Its population growth rate over the decade 2001–2011 was 19.45 per cent. Alirajpur has a sex ratio of 1,009 females for every 1,000 males, and a literacy rate of 37.22 per cent, the lowest in India. Scheduled Castes and Scheduled Tribes make up 3.69% and 88.98% of the population respectively.

Languages of Alirajpur district (2011)
1. Bhilali (53.7%)
2. Bhili (35.4%)
3. Hindi (7.27%)
4. Gujarati (1.87%)
5. Others (1.76%)

Almost 90% of the population speaks different Bhili dialects. At the time of the 2011 census of India, 53.68% of the population in the district spoke Bhilali, 35.42% Bhili, 7.27% Hindi and 1.87% Gujarati as their first language.

== See also ==
- Jambukheda
- Chhaktala
