= Silwani Assembly constituency =

Constituency of the Madhya Pradesh legislative assembly in India

Coordinates: 23.30°N 78.44°E

Silwani
- Constituency No. 143 for the Madhya Pradesh Legislative Assembly

Constituency details
- Country: India
- Region: Central India
- State: Madhya Pradesh
- District: Raisen
- Lok Sabha constituency: Vidisha
- Established: 2008
- Reservation: None

Member of Legislative Assembly
- 16th Madhya Pradesh Legislative Assembly
- Incumbent Devendra Patel
- Party: Indian National Congress
- Elected year: 2023
- Preceded by: Rampal Singh

Silwani Assembly constituency is one of the 230 Vidhan Sabha (Legislative Assembly) constituencies of Madhya Pradesh state in central India.

== Overview ==
It is part of Raisen district.it cover all over Begamganj municipality and tehsil and Silwani tehsil of district.

== Members of Legislative Assembly ==
Election	Name	Party
2008	Devendra Patel	Bharatiya Jan Shakti
2013	Rampal Singh	Bharatiya Janata Party
2018	Rampal Singh	Bharatiya Janata Party
2023	Devendra Patel	Indian National Congress

== Election results ==
=== 2023 ===
2023 Madhya Pradesh Legislative Assembly election: Silwani
Party	Candidate	Votes	%	±%
INC	Devendra Patel	95,935	51.39	+14.54
BJP	Rampal Singh	84,481	45.26	+3.84
ASP(KR)	Mohd Talat Khan	1,929	1.03	
NOTA	None of the above	2,022	1.08	+0.64
Majority		11,454	6.13	+1.56
Turnout		186,668	82.94	+4.64
INC gain from BJP		Swing		

=== 2018 ===
2018 Madhya Pradesh Legislative Assembly election: Silwani
Party	Candidate	Votes	%	±%
BJP	Rampal Singh	64,222	41.42	
INC	Devendra Patel	57,150	36.85	
Independent	Neelmani Shah (Baba Sahab)	16,892	10.89	
SP	Gori Singh Yadav	3,606	2.33	
Independent	Ramrishi	2,018	1.3	
Independent	Dinesh	1,892	1.22	
NOTA	None of the above	675	0.44	
Majority		7,072	4.57	
Turnout		155,068	78.3	
BJP gain from		Swing		

== See also ==
1. Silwani
