= Udaipura =

Udaipura Udaipura
- Town
- Location in Madhya Pradesh, India Udaipura (India)
- Coordinates: 23.08°N 78.5°E
- Country: India
- State: Madhya Pradesh
- District: Raisen
- Elevation: 321 m (1,053 ft)

Population (2011)
  - Total: 67,000

Languages
  - Official: Hindi
- Time zone: UTC+5:30 (IST)
- PIN: 464770

Udaipura is a town and a nagar panchayat in Raisen district in the Indian state of Madhya Pradesh. Udaipura has an average elevation of 321 metres (1,053 feet).

== Demographics ==
As of 2001 India census, Udaipura had a population of 13,790. Males constitute 54% of the population and females 46%. Udaipura has an average literacy rate of 65%, higher than the national average of 59.5%: male literacy is 72%, and female literacy is 57%. In Udaipura, 15% of the population is under 6 years of age.

== Government ==
Udaipura is part of the Udaipura Assembly. Narendra Patel is MLA from here. It's part of hoshangabad lok sabha.

== Places of interest ==
1. Boras Narmada's Ghat
2. Shahid Smarak
3. Walled Enclave at Deori

== Transportation ==
Udaipura is well connected with roads. Daily bus service runs from Udaipura. Udaipura is connected with Sagar, Bhopal, Jabalpur, Raisen, Gadarwara, Silwani, Bareli, and many cities.
