= Rahatgarh =

- Town
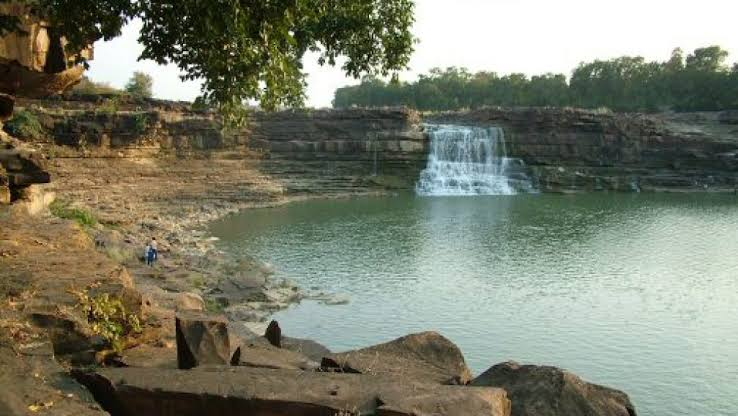
- Rahatgarh Waterfall

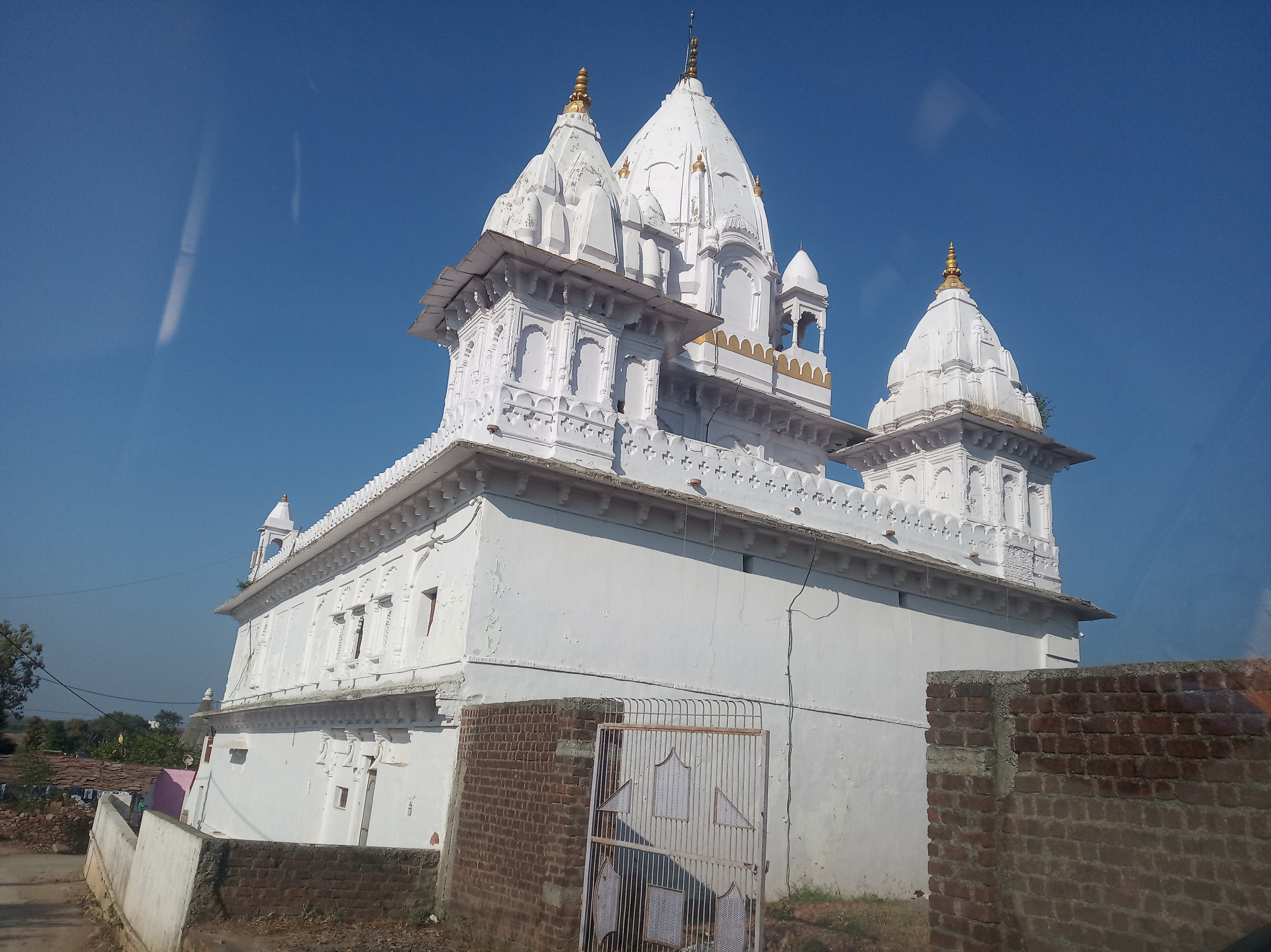
- Nickname: Jain temple in rahatgarh

- Location in Madhya Pradesh, India Rahatgarh (India)
- Coordinates: 23.78°N 78.37°E
- Country: India
- State: Madhya Pradesh
- District: Sagar
- Elevation: 461 m (1,512 ft)

Population (2011)
  - Total: 31,537
- Time zone: UTC+5:30 (IST)
- PIN: 470119
- Telephone code: +917584
- ISO 3166 code: IN-MP
- Vehicle registration: mp 15

Rahatgarh is a town and a nagar panchayat in Sagar district in the Indian state of Madhya Pradesh. Its also a tehsil headquarter.

== History ==
Originally built by Sultan Muhamad Khan (Circa 17th Century AD), Rahatgarh Fort is situated on the top of north west peak along the range of hills near the town itself. It can be approached by means of a long winding passage, and the walls of the fortification are approximately 100 m thick.

An inscription of the Paramara king Jayavarman II, dated 28 August 1256 CE, was issued at Rahatgarh and discovered on a stone slab by Alexander Cunningham during the 1870s. The 14-line inscription is written in Sanskrit prose.

The inscription drafts a royal document of Maharajadhiraja ("great king") of Dhara. As the inscription is partially damaged, different scholars have read the name of the king as "Jayasimhadeva" or "Jayavarmadeva".

It is possible that Jayavarman captured the area from the Chandelas.

Originally built by Sultan Muhamad Khan (Circa 17th Century AD), Rahatgarh Fort is situated on the top of north west peak along the range of hills near the town itself. It can be approached by means of a long winding passage, and the walls of the fortification are approximately 100 m thick.

== Geography ==
Rahatgarh is located at 23.78°N 78.37°E. It has an average elevation of 461 metres (1,512 feet).

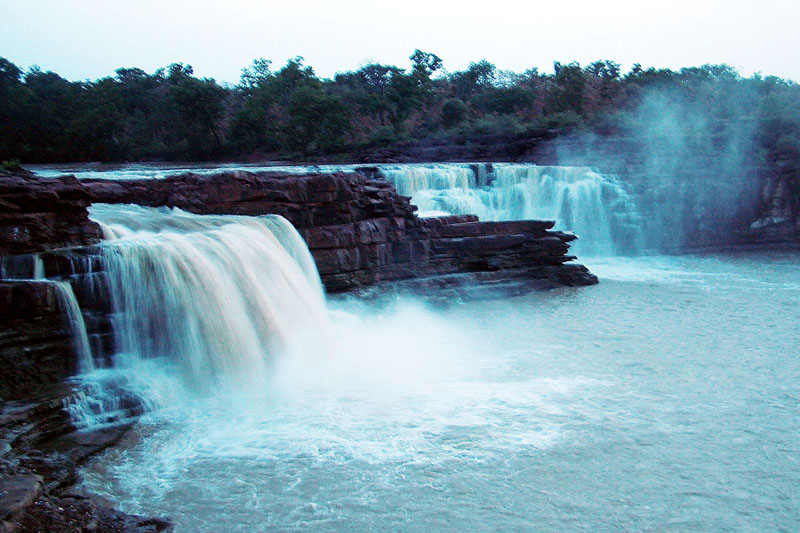
Rahatgarh Waterfall

The town is also notable for the Rahatgarh waterfall.

== Demographics ==
As of 2001 India census, Rahatgarh had a population of 25,217. Males constitute 53% of the population and females 47%. Rahatgarh has an average literacy rate of 51%, lower than the national average of 59.5%: male literacy is 61%, and female literacy is 40%. In Rahatgarh, 19% of the population is under 6 years of age.

== Civil administration ==
Rahatgarh is a tehsil and a Development Block, it's also a nagar panchayat divided into 15 ward, every 5 year election for here

== Tourism ==
1 Rahatgarh Fort

2 Rahatgarh Waterfall

3 Bina River

== Transportation ==
Rahatgarh situated on NH 146, Connecting Sagar and Bhopal, Daily bus service available from here,

== See also ==
- Surkhi
- Jaisinagar
- Bilehra
