= Silwani =

Town in Madhya Pradesh

- Town
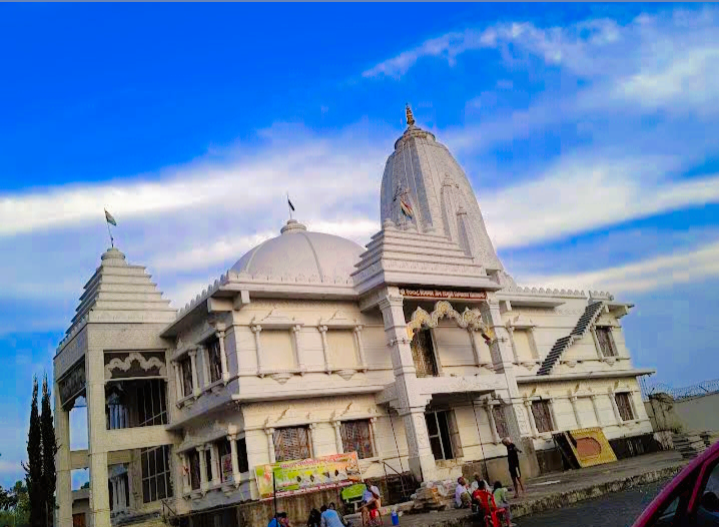
- 1008 Digambar Jain Temple

- Location in Madhya Pradesh, India Silwani (India)
- Coordinates: 23.30°N 78.44°E
- Country: India
- State: Madhya Pradesh
- District: Raisen District

Population (2011)
  - Total: 18,623

Languages
  - Official: Hindi
- Time zone: UTC+5:30 (IST)
- Postal code: 470226
- ISO 3166 code: IN-MP
- Vehicle registration: MP-38

Silwani is a city and a nagar panchayat in Raisen district of Madhya Pradesh, India. It is the administrative headquarters of Silwani tehsil.

== Geography ==
Silwani is located at 23.30°N 78.44°E. It has an average elevation of 303 metres (994 feet). It is located near Vindhyachal Range and surrounded by mountains.

== Demographics ==
The Silwani Nagar Panchayat had a population of 18,623 of which 9,655 were males and 8,968 were females, as per Census India 2011. The literacy rate of Silwani city is 82.53 % higher than the state average of 69.32 %.

== Government ==
Silwani is part of the Silwani Assembly constituency. Devendra Patel is MLA from Silwani.

Silwani is part of Vidisha Lok Sabha constituency along with seven other Vidhan Sabha segments.

== Civil Administration ==
Silwani city is divided into 15 wards for which elections are held every 5 years.

Silwani Nagar Panchayat has total administration over 3,617 houses to which it supplies basic amenities like water and sewerage. It is also authorize to build roads within Nagar Panchayat limits and impose taxes on properties coming under its jurisdiction.

== Place of interest ==
- Nakti River
- Mraggannath Waterfall
- Digambar Jain mandir
- Ramrasiya Sarkar Mandir

== Transportation ==
Silwani is well connected with roads. State Highway 15 passing from here, Udaipura, Sagar, Bareli, Gairatganj, Gadarwara, Raisen, Bhopal connected from roads, Daily bus service available from here.

== See also ==
- Silwani Assembly constituency
- Raisen District
