= State Highway 15 (Madhya Pradesh) =

State highway in Madhya Pradesh, India

State Highway 15

Major junctions
- East end: Jabalpur
- Patan, Tendukheda, Rehli, Sagar, Jaisinagar, Silwani, Bareli, Shahganj
- West end: Budhni

Location
- Country: India
- State: Madhya Pradesh

Highway system
- Roads in India; Expressways; National; State; Asian; State Highways in Madhya Pradesh

Madhya Pradesh State Highway 15 (MP SH 15) is a State Highway running from Jabalpur city via Patan, Tendukheda, Rehli, Sagar, Jaisinagar, Silwani, Bareli, Shahganj and terminating near Budhni town in Sehore district of Madhya Pradesh. It is an important state highway which connects important towns of South-Eastern, North-Eastern and Central Madhya Pradesh.

== See also ==
- List of state highways in Madhya Pradesh
