= Jaisinagar =

Town in India

- Town
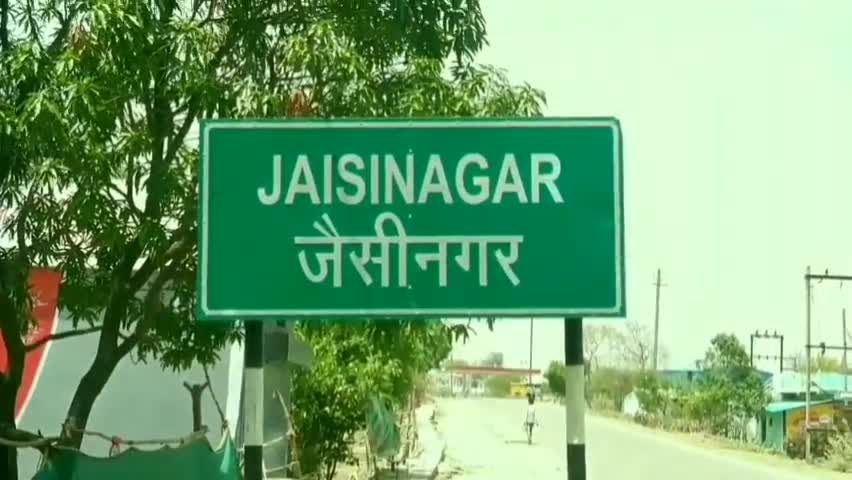

- Location in Madhya Pradesh, India Jaisinagar (India)
- Coordinates: 23.61°N 78.57°E
- Country: India
- State: Madhya Pradesh
- District: Sagar

Population (2011)
  - Total: 7,848

Languages
  - Official: Hindi
- Time zone: UTC+5:30 (IST)
- Postal code: 470226
- ISO 3166 code: IN-MP
- Vehicle registration: MP-15

Jaisinagar is a town in Sagar district of Madhya Pradesh. It is a tehsil and Development Block,

Jaisinagar is a part of Surkhi Assembly constituency, Govind Singh Rajput MLA from here

== Geography ==
Jaisinagar is situated between the latitude 23.61' north and the longitude 78.57' east. The region is predominantly agrarian.

== Demographics ==
The Jaisinagar town has population of 7,848 of which 4,149 are males while 3,699 are females as per Population Census 2011. The literacy rate of Jaisinagar village was 79.71% compared to 69.32% of Madhya Pradesh.

== Transportation ==
Jaisinagar situated on MP SH 15, its connected Sagar with roads, Jaisinagar 40 km away from Sagar, Daily bus service available from here, it's connected sagar, Silwani, Begamganj and Rahatgarh from bus,

== See also ==
- Surkhi
- Rahatgarh
- Bilehra
