= Devendra Patel =

Indian politician

Member of the Madhya Pradesh Legislative Assembly
- In office 2008–2013
- Succeeded by: Rampal Singh
- Constituency: Silwani

Devendra Patel is a politician from Madhya Pradesh. He had fought and won the 2008 Madhya Pradesh legislative assembly elections from Silwani in the district of Raisen, on the ticket of Bharatiya Janshakti Party.

He won the election by defeating Rampal Singh of Bhartiya Janata Party by a margin of 247 votes only. After the party's founder Uma Bharti merged the party with Bhartiya Janata Party, Patel started being ignored by BJP members and so he decided to join Indian National Congress, in 2013, ahead of the 2013 Madhya Pradesh Legislative assembly elections, along with his 17 supporters. In 2014, he contested the Lok Sabha elections from Hoshangabad, but lost.
