= Mahua Kheda =

Mahua Kheda may refer to:

- Mahua Kheda, Berasia, a village in Madhya Pradesh, India
- Mahua Kheda, Huzur, a village in Madhya Pradesh, India
- Mahua Kheda, Raisen, a village in Madhya Pradesh, India
