= Barkhera railway station =

Railway station in Madhya Pradesh

Barkhera

General information
- Location: National Highway 69, Barkhera, Raisen district, Madhya Pradesh; India
- Coordinates: 22.917359°N 77.649646°E
- Elevation: 472 metres (1,549 ft)
- System: Indian Railway Station
- Owner: Indian Railways
- Operator: West Central Railway
- Line: Bhopal–Nagpur section
- Platforms: 2
- Tracks: 2

Construction
- Structure type: Standard (on ground station)
- Parking: Yes
- Cycle facilities: No

Other information
- Status: Functioning
- Station code: BKA
- Zone(s): West Central Railway
- Division(s): Bhopal

History
- Opened: 1884

Services
Preceding station	Indian Railways	Following station
Obaidulla Ganj towards ?	West Central Railway zone Bhopal–Nagpur branch line	Choka towards ?
Location
- Location within India Location within Madhya Pradesh

Barkhera railway station is a railway station of Bhopal–Nagpur section under Bhopal railway division of West Central Railway zone of Indian Railways. The station is situated beside National Highway 69 at Barkhera in Raisen district of Indian state of Madhya Pradesh.

== History ==
The Bhopal–Itarsi line was opened by the Begum of Bhopal in 1884. Itarsi and Nagpur Junction railway station was linked in between 1923 and 1924. Electrification started in Bhopal–Itarsi section in 1988–89 and the rest Itarsi to Nagpur section was electrified in 1990–91.
