= Gairatganj =

- city
- Location in Madhya Pradesh, India Gairatganj (India)
- Coordinates: 23°24′44″N 78°13′18″E
- Country: India
- State: Madhya Pradesh
- District: Raisen

Population (2011)
  - Total: 18,090

Languages
  - Official: Hindi
- Time zone: UTC+5:30 (IST)
- PIN: 464884
- Telephone code: 07481
- ISO 3166 code: IN-MP
- Vehicle registration: MP 38
- Sex ratio: 10/9 ♂/♀

Gairatganj is a City and Nagar Panchayat in Raisen district in the state of Madhya Pradesh, India. It's also a Tehsil Headquarter.

== Geography ==
Gairatganj is located on 23°24′44″N 78°13′18″E. It has an average elevation of 508 metres (1669 feet). This city is situated on the banks of Bina river.

== Demographics ==
As of the 2011 Census of India, Gairatganj had a population of 18,090. Males constitute 53% of the population and females 47%. Gairatganj has an average literacy rate of 71%, higher than the national average of 59.5%: male literacy is 76%, and female literacy is 65%. In Gairatganj, 25% of the population is under 5 years of age.

== Administration ==
Gairatganj is a Nagar Panchayat city in district of Raisen, Madhya Pradesh. The Gairatganj city is divided into 15 wards for which elections are held every 5 years.

Gairatganj Nagar Panchayat has total administration over 3,830 houses to which it supplies basic amenities like water and sewerage.

== Transport ==
The nearest airport is Bhopal.roads connected it from Sagar, Raisen and Bhopal. Gairatganj is 55 km away from District Headquarter Raisen. 464884 Pin Code of Gairatganj.

== See also ==
- Raisen District
- Dehgaon
