= Goharganj =

Town in Madhya Pradesh

- Village
- Location in Madhya Pradesh, India
- Coordinates: 23.02°N 77.67°E
- Country: India
- State: Madhya Pradesh
- District: Raisen

Government
  - Type: Gram Panchayat

Population (2011)
  - Total: 4,659
- Vehicle registration: MP 38

Gaouharganj is a small town located in Raisen District of Madhya Pradesh. It's also Tehsil Headquarter.

== Geography ==
Goharganj is located in Raisen district with pincode 464990. It's 45 km away from Bhopal and 50 km away from Raisen
