= Baraily tehsil =

baraily tehsil
- Tehsil
- Location in Madhya Pradesh baraily tehsil (India)
- Coordinates: 23.006389°N 78.230000°E
- Country: India
- State: Madhya Pradesh
- District: Raisen district

Government
  - Type: Janpad Panchayat
  - Body: Council

Languages
  - Official: Hindi
- Time zone: UTC+5:30 (IST)
- Postal code (PIN): 464668
- ISO 3166 code: MP-IN

Baraily tehsil is a tehsil in Raisen district, Madhya Pradesh, India. It is also a subdivision of the administrative and revenue division of raisen district of Madhya Pradesh. Assembly constituency is silwani.

== See also ==
- Khargone
