= Bina River (India) =

Bina River Bina River
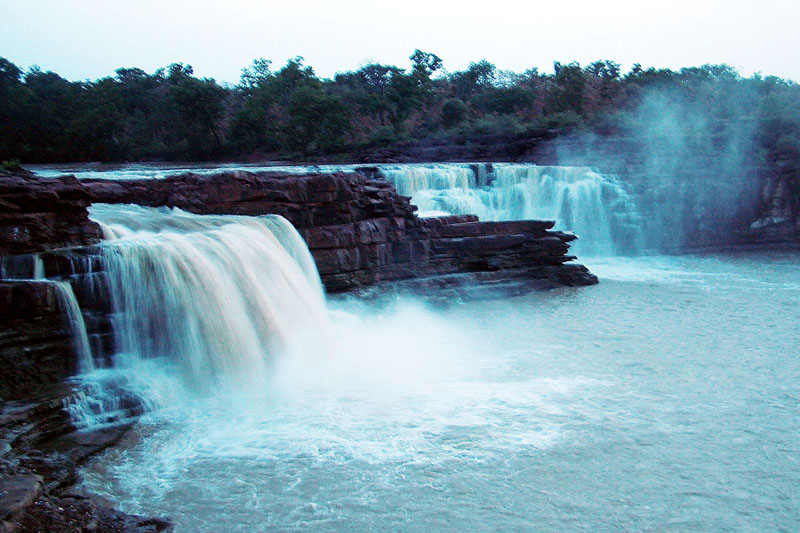
- Rahatgarh Waterfall on Beena River

- Indian River Map

Location
- Country: India
- State: Madhya Pradesh
- Cities: Gairatganj, Begamganj, Rahatgarh, Khurai, Bina

Physical characteristics
- Mouth: Betwa River
  - location: Sagar district , Madhya Pradesh , India
  - coordinates: 24°10′19″N 78°02′20″E

The Bina River is a river that flows in Madhya Pradesh state of India. It is a chief tributary of the Betwa River, which is itself a tributary of the Yamuna River.

== Origin ==
Bina River originates from Vindhya Range in Gairatganj tehsil of Raisen district, this river flows in Raisen and Sagar district and joins Betwa River.

== Tributaries ==
Begam, Reuta and baban river is tributaries of bina river

== Settlements ==
Gairatganj, Begamganj, Eran and Rahatgarh are on Bina River banks.

== Tourism ==
- Bhalkund waterfall
- Rahatgarh Fort
- Eran
- Hanota dam near hanota village khurai
