= Balampur =

- village
- Location within Madhya Pradesh Location within India
- Coordinates: 23.3914729°N 77.5275463°E
- Country: India
- State: Madhya Pradesh
- District: Bhopal
- Tehsil: Huzur
- Elevation: 546 m (1,791 ft)

Population (2011)
  - Total: 2,885
- Time zone: UTC+5:30 (IST)
- ISO 3166 code: MP-IN
- 2011 census code: 482411

Balampur is a village in the Bhopal district of Madhya Pradesh, India. It is located in the Huzur tehsil and the Phanda block. Bhadbhadaghat is the nearest railway station.

== Demographics ==
According to the 2011 census of India, Balampur has 611 households. The effective literacy rate (i.e. the literacy rate of population excluding children aged 6 and below) is 65.3%.

Demographics (2011 Census)
	Total	Male	Female
Population	2885	1525	1360
Children aged below 6 years	453	235	218
Scheduled caste	288	161	127
Scheduled tribe	279	139	140
Literates	1588	992	596
Workers (all)	1052	803	249
Main workers (total)	515	448	67
Main workers: Cultivators	217	201	16
Main workers: Agricultural labourers	171	154	17
Main workers: Household industry workers	26	16	10
Main workers: Other	101	77	24
Marginal workers (total)	537	355	182
Marginal workers: Cultivators	42	35	7
Marginal workers: Agricultural labourers	181	111	70
Marginal workers: Household industry workers	85	38	47
Marginal workers: Others	229	171	58
Non-workers	1833	722	1111
