= Amoni =

- village
- Location within Madhya Pradesh Location within India
- Coordinates: 23.3685407°N 77.5425957°E
- Country: India
- State: Madhya Pradesh
- District: Bhopal
- Tehsil: Huzur
- Elevation: 460 m (1,510 ft)

Population (2011)
  - Total: 1,123
- Time zone: UTC+5:30 (IST)
- ISO 3166 code: MP-IN
- 2011 census code: 482423

Amoni is a village in the Bhopal district of Madhya Pradesh, India. It is located in the Huzur tehsil and the Phanda block. Bhadbhadaghat is the nearest railway station.

Amoni is located close to a forest area, which is home to animals such as tigers and bears.

== Demographics ==
According to the 2011 census of India, Amoni has 219 households. The effective literacy rate (i.e. the literacy rate of population excluding children aged 6 and above) is 66.21%.

Demographics (2011 Census)
	Total	Male	Female
Population	1123	605	518
Children aged below 6 years	176	99	77
Scheduled caste	236	129	107
Scheduled tribe	463	247	216
Literates	627	390	237
Workers (all)	572	324	248
Main workers (total)	301	245	56
Main workers: Cultivators	136	126	10
Main workers: Agricultural labourers	120	83	37
Main workers: Household industry workers	2	2	0
Main workers: Other	43	34	9
Marginal workers (total)	271	79	192
Marginal workers: Cultivators	6	2	4
Marginal workers: Agricultural labourers	251	70	181
Marginal workers: Household industry workers	3	2	1
Marginal workers: Others	11	5	6
Non-workers	551	281	270
