= Rahatgarh Waterfall =

Rahatgarh Falls
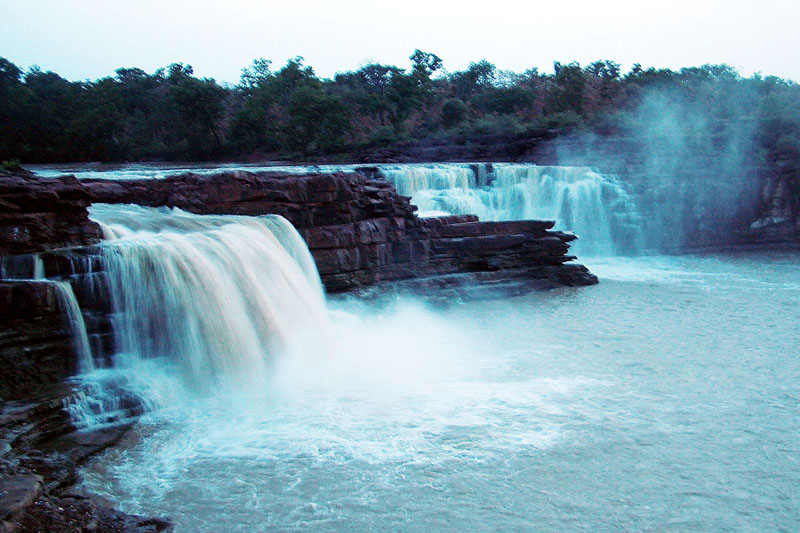
- Rahatgarh Waterfall
- Interactive map of Rahatgarh Falls
- Location: Rahatgarh, Sagar District, Madhya Pradesh, India
- Coordinates: 23.76°N 78.39°E
- Total height: 16 metres (52 ft)
- Watercourse: Bina River

The Rahatgarh Falls or Bhalkund Falls is a natural waterfall on the Bina River, located in Rahatgarh in the Indian state of Madhya Pradesh.

== Overview ==
Rahatgarh town, located about 40 km away on the Sagar-Bhopal road, is now a very popular picnic spot because of the waterfall. Local residents of Sagar visit here in large numbers to spend time on their holidays during the rainy season. It is a very popular picnic spot due to the lack of such places around the city.

== Reach ==
Rahatgarh waterfall is located in Sagar - Bhopal road, it's 40 km away from Saugor.

== See also ==
- List of waterfalls
- List of waterfalls in India
