= Gairatganj tehsil =

- Tehsil
- Location in Madhya Pradesh Gairatganj tehsil (India)
- Coordinates: 23.24°N 77.13°E
- Country: India
- State: Madhya Pradesh
- District: Raisen district

Government
  - Type: Janpad Panchayat
  - Body: Council

Languages
  - Official: Hindi
- Time zone: UTC+5:30 (IST)
- ISO 3166 code: MP-IN

Gairatganj tehsil is a tehsil in Raisen district, Madhya Pradesh, India. It is also a subdivision of the administrative and revenue division of Bhopal district of Madhya Pradesh. The assembly constituency is Sanchi.
