= Walled Enclave at Deori =

Deorī
- Royal enclave
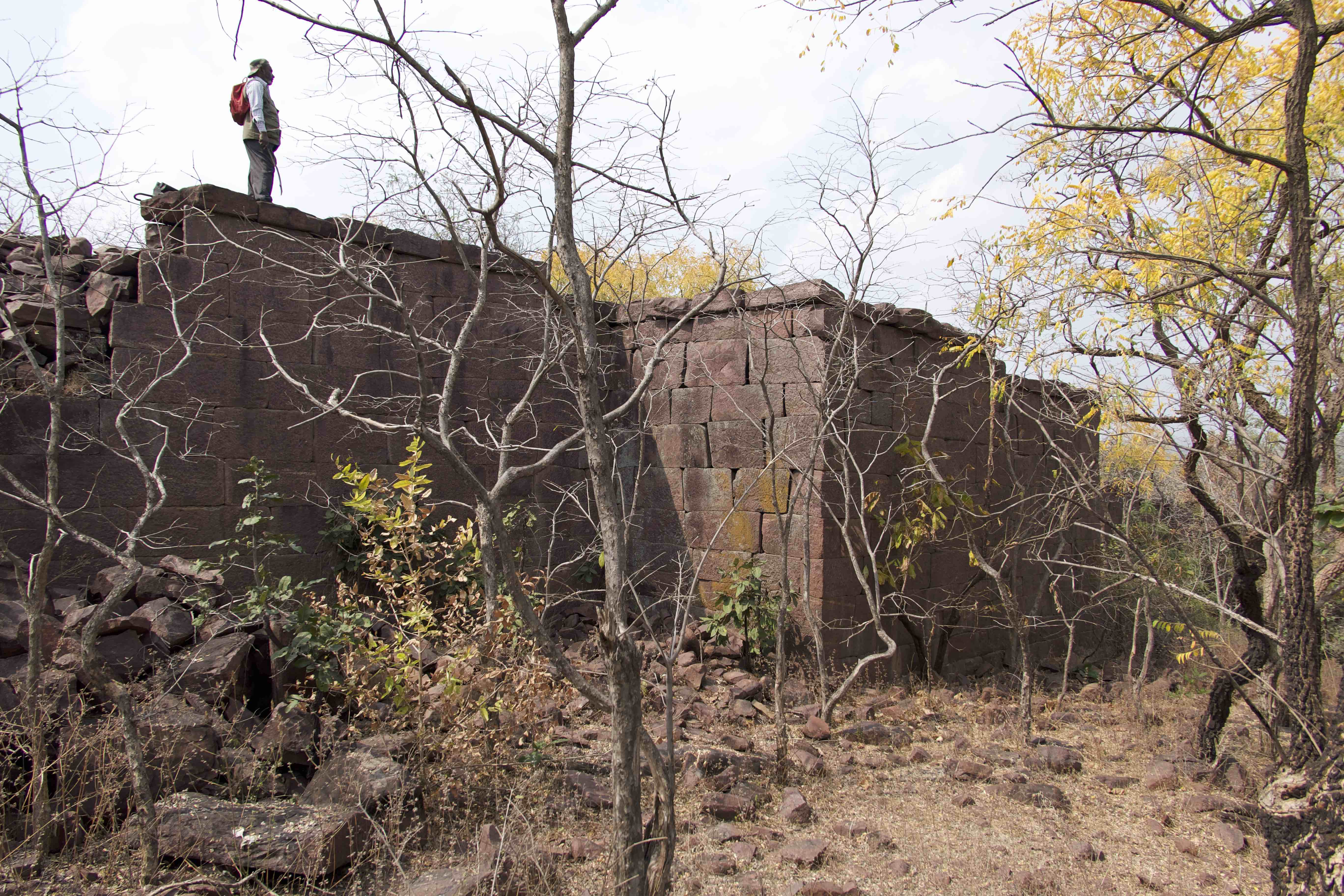
- Deori, curtain wall of the enclave, eastern flank

- Possible location in present-day Madhya Pradesh, India Deorī (India)
- Coordinates: 23.133257°N 78.686914°E
- Country: India
- State: Madhya Pradesh
- District: Raisen
- Elevation: 300 m (980 ft)

Languages
  - Official: Hindi
- Time zone: UTC+5:30 (IST)

The Walled Enclave at Deori (Hindi देवरी) is an extensive network of high stone walls in a forest area immediately above the village of Deori in Raisen district, Madhya Pradesh. Set on a ridge of the Vindhya Range overlooking the Narmada basin, the Deori walls run about 4 km in length in the area next to the Mogha reservoir, with further internal walls inside the enclosure proper. The walls, where they are preserved, are made of finely cut blocks of ashlar, dry set without mortar. Associated sculptures belong to the Paramara dynasty and date largely to 11th century, the period of the temple at Udaipur, Madhya Pradesh built by king Udayaditya. The centre piece of the Deori enclave is a small river and waterfall, evidently a place of sport and recreation for the Paramara elite.

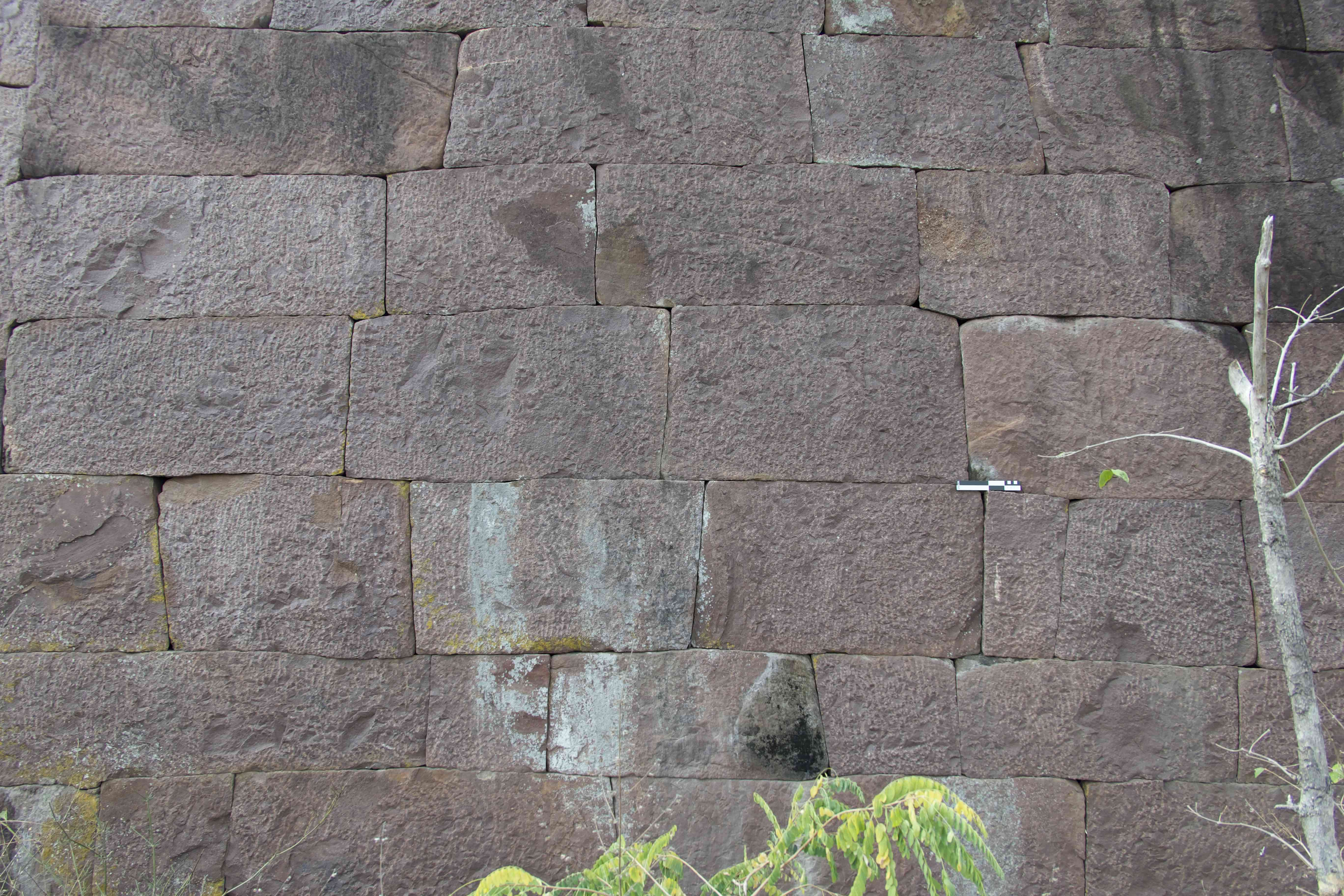
Deori, detail of dry set masonry.

Other walls stretch in a line to the east in the direction of Gorakhpur village, 5 km distant. At Gorakhpur, there are further walls, a large tank known as Pāpītālāb and the remains of a temple of the Paramara period.

Though sometimes called the “Great Wall of India,” that accolade is usually given to the fortifications at Kumbhalgarh in Rajasthan. The Deori walls, pre-dating the advent of artillery in India under the Bahmani Sultanate and Mughal rulers, seem to be part of an extensive royal enclave. The palace buildings were probably made of wood and have disappeared.
