= Sultanpur, Madhya Pradesh =

Sultanpur
- Town
- Location in Madhya Pradesh, India Sultanpur (India)
- Coordinates: 23.15°N 77.93°E
- Country: India
- State: Madhya Pradesh
- District: Raisen
- Elevation: 366 m (1,201 ft)

Population (2001)
  - Total: 8,716

Languages
  - Official: Hindi
- Time zone: UTC+5:30 (IST)
- ISO 3166 code: IN-MP
- Vehicle registration: MP

Sultanpur is a town and a nagar panchayat in Raisen district in the Indian state of Madhya Pradesh.

== Geography ==
Sultanpur is located at 23.15°N 77.93°E. It has an average elevation of 366 metres (1200 feet).

== Demographics ==
As of 2001 India census, Sultanpur had a population of 8716. Males constitute 54% of the population and females 46%. Sultanpur has an average literacy rate of 57%, lower than the national average of 59.5%: male literacy is 63%, and female literacy is 50%. In Sultanpur, 18% of the population is under 6 years of age.
