= Bamhori, Madhya Pradesh =

Town in Madhya Pradesh, India

Bamhori
- Village
- Location in Madhya Pradesh, India
- Coordinates: 23.20°N 78.29°E
- Country: India
- State: Madhya Pradesh
- District: Raisen

Government
  - Type: Gram Panchayat

Population (2011)
  - Total: 5,177
- Vehicle registration: MP 38

Bamhori is a village in Raisen district, Madhya Pradesh, India.

== Geography ==
Bamhori is located at 23.20°N, 78.29°E. It has an average elevation of 352 metres (1,155 ft), and is located in the Vindhya Range.

== Population ==
As of the 2011 census, Bamhori had 1,135 households and population of 5,177: 2,664 (51.5%) were male, while 2,513 (48.5%) were female. 75.79% of its residents were literate.
