= Badi, Raisen =

Badi बाड़ी Bari
- Town
- Location in Madhya Pradesh, India Badi (India)
- Coordinates: 23°2′12″N 78°5′3″E
- Country: India
- State: Madhya Pradesh
- District: Raisen

Government
  - Type: Nagar Palika

Population (2011)
  - Total: 19,603

Languages
  - Official: Hindi
- Time zone: UTC+5:30 (IST)
- Pin Code: 464665
- ISO 3166 code: IN-MP
- Vehicle registration: MP-38

Badi is a town and a nagar panchayat in Raisen district in the state of Madhya Pradesh, India. Its also a Tehsil Headquarter in Raisen District.

== Demographics ==
As of the 2011 Census of India, Badi had a population of 19,603. Males constitute 53% of the population and females 47%. Badi has an average literacy rate of 61%, higher than the national average of 59.5%; with 60% of the males and 40% of females literate. 17% of the population is under 6 years of age.
