= Mahua Kheda, Huzur =

Mahua Kheda
- village
- Location within Madhya Pradesh Location within India
- Coordinates: 23.156418°N 77.358043°E
- Country: India
- State: Madhya Pradesh
- District: Bhopal
- Tehsil: Huzur

Population (2011)
  - Total: 34
- Time zone: UTC+5:30 (IST)
- ISO 3166 code: MP-IN
- Census code: 482520

Mahua Kheda is a village in the Bhopal district of Madhya Pradesh, India. It is located in the Huzur tehsil, near the Bhadbhadaghat railway station.

== Demographics ==
According to the 2011 census of India, Mahua Kheda has 9 households. The effective literacy rate (i.e. the literacy rate of population excluding children aged 6 and below) is 40.74%.

Demographics (2011 Census)
	Total	Male	Female
Population	34	18	16
Children aged below 6 years	7	3	4
Scheduled caste	0	0	0
Scheduled tribe	10	4	6
Literates	11	9	2
Workers (all)	13	12	1
Main workers (total)	8	8	0
Main workers: Cultivators	1	1	0
Main workers: Agricultural labourers	0	0	0
Main workers: Household industry workers	0	0	0
Main workers: Other	7	7	0
Marginal workers (total)	5	4	1
Marginal workers: Cultivators	0	0	0
Marginal workers: Agricultural labourers	4	3	1
Marginal workers: Household industry workers	0	0	0
Marginal workers: Others	1	1	0
Non-workers	21	6	15
