= Khargone, Raisen =

Town in Madhya Pradesh, India

Khargone
- Town
- Location in Madhya Pradesh, India
- Coordinates: 23.09°N 78.31°E

Khargone is a small town in the Raisen District of Madhya Pradesh. It belongs to Baraily tehsil.

== Geography ==
Khargone is located at 23.09°N, 78.31°E. It has an average elevation of 508 metres (1,667 ft). The Tendoni River flows near the town.

== Demographics ==
Khargone town had a population of 5047, of whom 2664 were males while 2383 are females, as of Census 2011.

== Tourist places ==
- Jamvant caves, Jaamgarh
- Chhind Dham, Chhind
- Khonawale baba, Khargone

== Transportation ==
Khargone is well connected from other cities of the district. It is situated on NH 45.
