= Mahua Kheda, Berasia =

Mahua Kheda
- village
- Location within Madhya Pradesh Location within India
- Coordinates: 23.756906°N 77.365741°E
- Country: India
- State: Madhya Pradesh
- District: Bhopal
- Tehsil: Berasia

Population (2011)
  - Total: 115
- Time zone: UTC+5:30 (IST)
- ISO 3166 code: MP-IN
- Census code: 482130

Mahua Kheda is a village in the Bhopal district of Madhya Pradesh, India. It is located in the Berasia tehsil.

== Demographics ==
According to the 2011 census of India, Mahua Kheda has 23 households. The effective literacy rate (i.e. the literacy rate of population excluding children aged 6 and below) is 37.63%.

Demographics (2011 Census)
	Total	Male	Female
Population	115	61	54
Children aged below 6 years	22	10	12
Scheduled caste	0	0	0
Scheduled tribe	0	0	0
Literates	35	25	10
Workers (all)	28	27	1
Main workers (total)	28	27	1
Main workers: Cultivators	26	25	1
Main workers: Agricultural labourers	1	1	0
Main workers: Household industry workers	0	0	0
Main workers: Other	1	1	0
Marginal workers (total)	0	0	0
Marginal workers: Cultivators	0	0	0
Marginal workers: Agricultural labourers	0	0	0
Marginal workers: Household industry workers	0	0	0
Marginal workers: Others	0	0	0
Non-workers	87	34	53
