= Tendukheda, Damoh =

Tendukheda
- Municipality
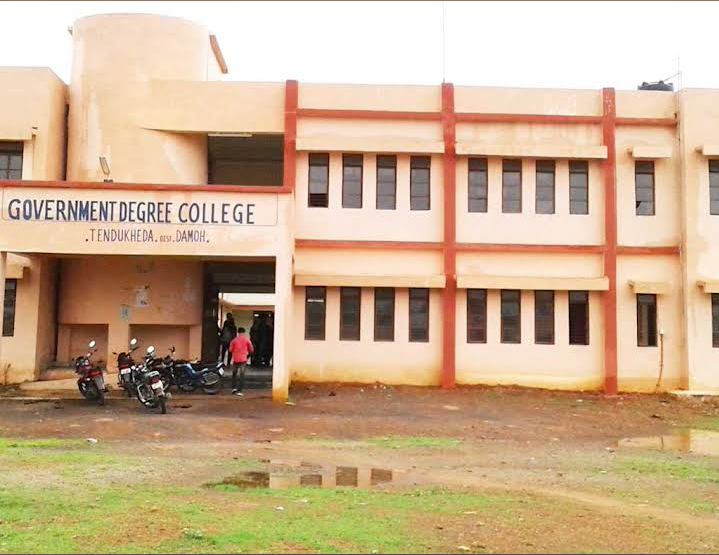
- Govt College Tendukheda, Damoh

- Location within Madhya Pradesh Location within India
- Coordinates: 23°23′45″N 79°32′18″E
- Country: India
- State: Madhya Pradesh
- District: damoh

Population (2011)
  - Municipality: 152,996
  - Urban: 14,399
  - Rural: 138,597

Languages
  - Official: Hindi
- Time zone: UTC+5:30 (IST)
- PIN: 470880
- ISO 3166 code: IN-MP
- Vehicle registration: MP-49

Tendukheda is a town and municipality (nagar parishad) in Damoh district in the state of Madhya Pradesh, India. It is also a tehsil, or administrative division, which is part of Damoh Lok Sabha constituency. The town of Tendukheda is 56 kilometres (35 mi) from the district headquarters of Damoh.

== Demographics ==
According to the 2011 Census of India, the sub-district of Tendukheda in Damoh had an urban population of 14,399 and a total population including rural areas of 152,996.

== Description ==
In 2015, the foundation stone was laid for a new Jain temple of white marble, the first of its kind to be built in Madhya Pradesh.

The rest house here was built during the British period and still looks very beautiful due to good maintenance. It is told by elderly people that rock paintings of 500 to 1000 years ago have also been found in Bankagarh.

The town of Tendukheda has access to an animal ambulance service launched in Damoh district by the central government in 2023.

== Transportation ==
Damoh - Jabalpur Highway and Sagar - Jabalpur highway passing through Tendukheda. Daily bus service available for mejor nearby city from Tendukheda.

== Villages ==
Among the villages that are part of Tendukheda tehsil or Tendukheda block in Damoh district are:

- Bhainsa Sarra
- Doni
- Jaitgarh
- Kamariakalan

== See also ==
- Jabera Assembly constituency
- Damoh district
