= Dehgaon =

Town in Madhya Pradesh, India

- Town
- Location in Madhya Pradesh, India Dehgaon (India)
- Coordinates: 23.32°N 78.08°E
- Country: India
- State: Madhya Pradesh
- District: Raisen District
- Elevation: 508 m (1,667 ft)

Population
  - Total: 7,902

Dehgaon is a town in Raisen District, Madhya Pradesh, India.

== Geography ==
Dehgaon is located at 23.32°N, 78.08°E. It has an average elevation of 508 metres (1,667 ft).

== Demographics ==
As of the 2011 census, Dehgaon had 1,566 households and population of 7,902: 4,087 (51.7%) were male, while 3,815 (48.3%) were female. 82.08% of its residents were literate.
