= Bilehra =

Town in Madhya Pradesh, India

raja Bilehra
- Town
- Country: India
- State: Madhya Pradesh

Government
  - Type: Nagar Panchayat

Population (2011)
  - Total: 9,371

Languages
  - Official: Hindi
- Time zone: UTC+5:30 (IST)
- ISO 3166 code: IN-MP
- Vehicle registration: MP 15

Bilehra or Raja Bilehra is a town and a nagar panchayat in Sagar district of Madhya Pradesh in India. It belongs to Jaisinagar Tehsil.

== Demographics ==
In 2011, Bilehra had a population of 9,371, of which 4,894 were males while 4477 were females, as per Population Census 2011. The literacy rate was 80.14%.

== See also ==
- Surkhi
- Jaisinagar
- Sagar District
