= Surkhi =

Town in India

- Town
- Location in Madhya Pradesh, India Surkhi (India)
- Coordinates: 23.63°N 78.83°E
- Country: India
- State: Madhya Pradesh
- District: Sagar

Population (2011)
  - Total: 7,289

Languages
  - Official: Hindi
- Time zone: UTC+5:30 (IST)
- Postal code: 470226
- ISO 3166 code: IN-MP
- Vehicle registration: MP-15

Surkhi is a town and a nagar panchayat in Sagar district of Madhya Pradesh. It is situated 30 km away from the district headquarter.

It is part of Surkhi Assembly constituency. Govind Singh Rajput is MLA from here.

== Geography ==
Surkhi is situated between the latitude 23.63' north and the longitude 78.83' east. The region is predominantly agrarian.

== Demographics ==
Surkhi Town has a population of 7289 of which 3818 are males and 3471 are females, as per the population census of 2011.

== Government ==
Surkhi is a Nagar Panchayat city in district of Sagar, Madhya Pradesh. The Surkhi city is divided into 15 wards for which elections are held every 5 years.

== Transport ==
Surkhi is situated on NH 44 who commented it from sagar to deori and narsinghpur , daily bus service is available from here.

== See also ==
- Surkhi Assembly constituency
- Jaisinagar
- Bilehra
