= Rampal Singh (Madhya Pradesh politician) =

Indian politician

Member of Parliament, Lok Sabha
- In office 2006–2009
- Preceded by: Shivraj Singh Chouhan
- Succeeded by: Sushma Swaraj
- Constituency: Vidisha

Personal details
- Born: 4 January 1956 (age 70)
- Party: Bharatiya Janata Party
- Occupation: Agriculturist
- Profession: Politician
- Source

Rampal Singh (born 4 January 1956, Udaipura in Raisen district) is an Indian politician, belonging to Bhartiya Janata Party. In the 2006 by-elections he was elected to the 14th Lok Sabha from the Vidisha Lok Sabha constituency of Madhya Pradesh.

== Early life ==
He was also member of 10th and 11th Vidhan Sabha of Madhya Pradesh Assembly from Silwani - Begumganj constituency between 1990 and 1998. He was again elected in 2003 and in 2013. He was a former Minister of Public Works Department of Madhya Pradesh State Assembly. He is an agriculturist. He is married to Smt Shashi Prabha Rajput. He has three sons and one daughter and resides at Raisen district.
