= Bhadbhada Ghat railway station =

Railway station in Madhya Pradesh, India

Bhadbhada Ghat

General information
- Location: Bhadbhada Ghat, Raisen district, Madhya Pradesh; India
- Coordinates: 23°22′29″N 77°32′08″E
- Elevation: 475 metres (1,558 ft)
- System: Indian Railways station
- Owner: Indian Railways
- Operator: West Central Railway
- Line: Agra–Bhopal section
- Platforms: 2
- Tracks: 2

Construction
- Structure type: Standard (on ground)
- Parking: No

Other information
- Status: Functioning
- Station code: BVB
- Zone(s): West Central Railway
- Division(s): Bhopal
Location
- Location within India Location within Madhya Pradesh

Bhadbhada Ghat railway station is a railway station in Raisen district of Madhya Pradesh. Its code is BVB. The station consists of two platforms. Passenger trains halt here.
