= Baraily =

- Town
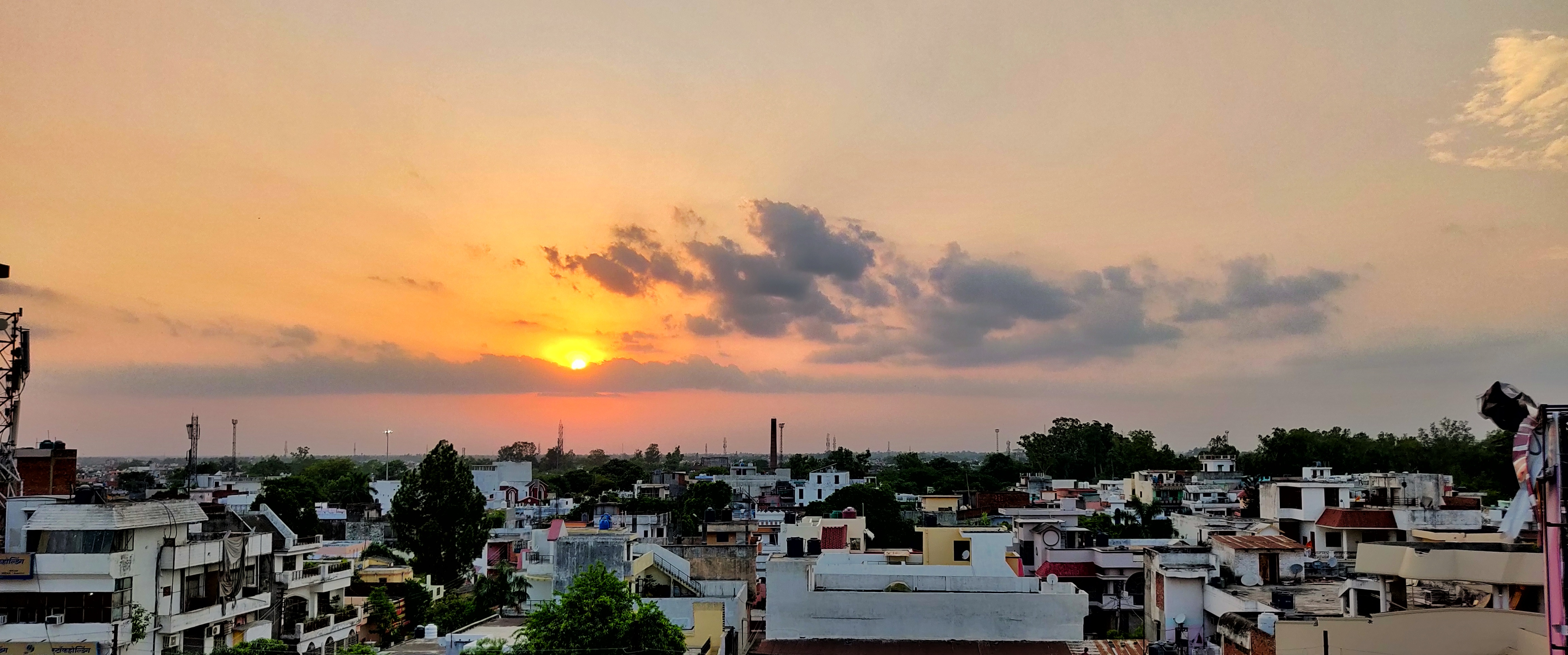
- Sunset at Baraily

- Location in Madhya Pradesh, India Baraily (India)
- Coordinates: 23°0′23″N 78°13′48″E
- Country: India
- State: Madhya Pradesh
- District: Raisen

Government
  - MLA: Narendra Shivaji Patel (BJP)
  - Mayor: Mr Hemant Choudhary (Bhartiya Janta Party)

Area
  - Total: 26.44 km^{2} (10.21 sq mi)

Population (2011)
  - Total: 34,663
  - Density: 1,311/km^{2} (3,395/sq mi)
- Time zone: UTC+5:30 (IST)
- Postal code: 464668
- Telephone code: 07486
- Vehicle Registration Plate: MP-38

Baraily is a town and a Municipality in Raisen district in the state of Madhya Pradesh, India. It is located in the Baraily tehsil. Baraily is a town in the Raisen district. There is a sub-jail in Baraily. Baraily is located on bank of Barna River. Baraily has National Krishi Upaj Mandi and it produces Wheat, Soyabean, Rice and different vegetable in different seasons. Baraily is connected with National Highway that connects to Bhopal and Jabalpur via NH-12(or NH-45)

== Education ==
There are many schools and colleges in Baraily affiliated to state and CBSE boards. Main educational institutes of education by the modern way of learning are Shri Maniklal Nahar international school (first school to become cbse till 12th class) Daffodils public school "Saraswati Shishu Vidhya mandir " Daffodils public school, Gurukul English medium school, Kidzee school (for playgroups), Sanskaar Bhumi CBSE School . Maria Vidhya Sadan is the oldest English medium CBSE Christian missionary school in the town. There are so many private colleges i.e. Gurukripa college, princeton college, anantam college, and a single government college That conduct examination of all the private college and of all the college that are nearby of Baraily town.

== Transport ==
Baraily is located beside National Highway 12 (NH-12), which connects it with the state capital Bhopal and Jabalpur and it starts form Jaipur to Jabalpur. The distance from Bhopal to Baraily is 120 km and from Baraily to Jabalpur is 200 km. It is also connected to other cities including Jaipur, Kota, Pipariya, Pachmarhi, Begumganj and Sagar. Baraily do not have railway connection but it is richly connected by roadways, some of the roadways companies connecting the routes are Shubham Travels, Atwal Travels, RK Verma etc. Nearest Railway Station is Pipariya which is 40 km from Baraily and nearest airport from Baraily is Raja Bhoj International Airport Bhopal.

== Geography ==
Baraily is located at 23.0°.23°°N 78.13°.48°°E.[1] It has an average elevation of 492 metres (1614 feet).

== Demographics ==
As of 2001 India census, Baraily had a population of 25,216. Males constitute 53% of the population and females 47%. Baraily has an average literacy rate of 69%, higher than the national average of 59.5%; with 58% of the males and 42% of females literate. 15% of the population is under 6 years of age. As per 2011 census, Baraily had total population of 34,663.

== General ==
Baraily is well known for its Sharbati variety of Wheat and Soybean and latterly for its rice production. Recent interest in Rice grain amongst local farmers has led to ample production of the product in the area

Barna is the nearest river in Baraily.

Nearest places to visit near Baraily are, Shri Hanuman Gadi Temple, Shri Chhind Dham Hanuman Temple (8.1 km), Aliganj Narmada Ji Ghat (15 km), Jamgarh Caves (25 km), Osho Tirth Kuchwada (24 km), Till Ganesh Temple (38 km), Barna Dam Badi (25 km), Hinglaj Mata Temple (20 km), Bhojpur Temple (60 km).

The nearest Railway Station is Pipariya (PPI) which is 42 km away and the nearest airport is Raja Bhoj Airport Bhopal which is 129 km away.

== Tourist sites ==
- Chheend Mandir (Hanuman Temple) - 8 km
- Kuchawada (Birthplace of the Osho Rajneesh) - 23 km
- Hanuman Gadi (Hanuman Temple) - 2 km
- Bari (Digambar Jain Temple, Barna Dam and Hinglaj Mandir) - 18 km
- Panchmari (Hill Station) - 85 km
- Jaamgarh (Birthplace of Jambavanta) - 20 km
- Khargone (Khona bale baba Jain temple) - 14 km
