= Begamganj =

Begumganj
- town
- Location in Madhya Pradesh, India
- Coordinates: 23.6°N 78.33°E
- Country: India
- State: Madhya Pradesh
- District: Raisen

Government
  - MP: Shivraj Singh Chouhan (BJP)
  - MLA: Devendra Patel (INC)
  - Mayor: Sandeep lodhi
- Elevation: 498 m (1,634 ft)

Population (2011)
  - Total: 34,031

Languages
  - Official: Hindi
- Time zone: UTC+5:30 (IST)
- PIN: 464881
- Telephone code: 07487
- ISO 3166 code: IN-MP
- Vehicle registration: MP-38

Begumganj is a City and a municipality in Raisen district in the state of Madhya Pradesh, India. and is located on the Bhopal - Sagar National Highway (NH-86 A) 120 km away from Bhopal. It is one of the five divisions of the Raisen district.

== Geography ==
Begumganj is located at 23.6°N 78.33°E. It has an average elevation of 498 metres (1633 feet). It is located on the river Bina. It is about 120 km north of Bhopal, the capital of the Central Indian State of Madhya Pradesh, and is about 85 km from Raisen town, which is the district headquarters.

== Demographics ==
As of the 2011 Census of India, Begumganj had a population of 34,031. Males constitute 52% of the population and females 48%. Begumganj has an average literacy rate of 72%, higher than the national average of 72.5%; with 58% of the males and 42% of females literate. 17% of the population is under 6 years of age. Begumganj has a mixed population of Hindus and Muslims. in the town, the Hindus,Muslims and Jains are almost in equal numbers.

== Transport ==
The nearest airport is Bhopal.roads connected it from Sagar, Raisen and Bhopal. It is much easier to reach Begumganj from Bhopal. On account of better roads and more frequent buses plying between Bhopal and Begumganj. It takes about 2.5 hours by a public transport bus to reach Begumganj from Bhopal, connected with fine state highway no.21. These buses are available 24 Hours from ISBT (Inter State Bus Terminal, Hoshangabad Road) stand of Bhopal. The nearest railway station is Sagar, 60 kilometers east of Begumganj.
