= Raisen =

- Town
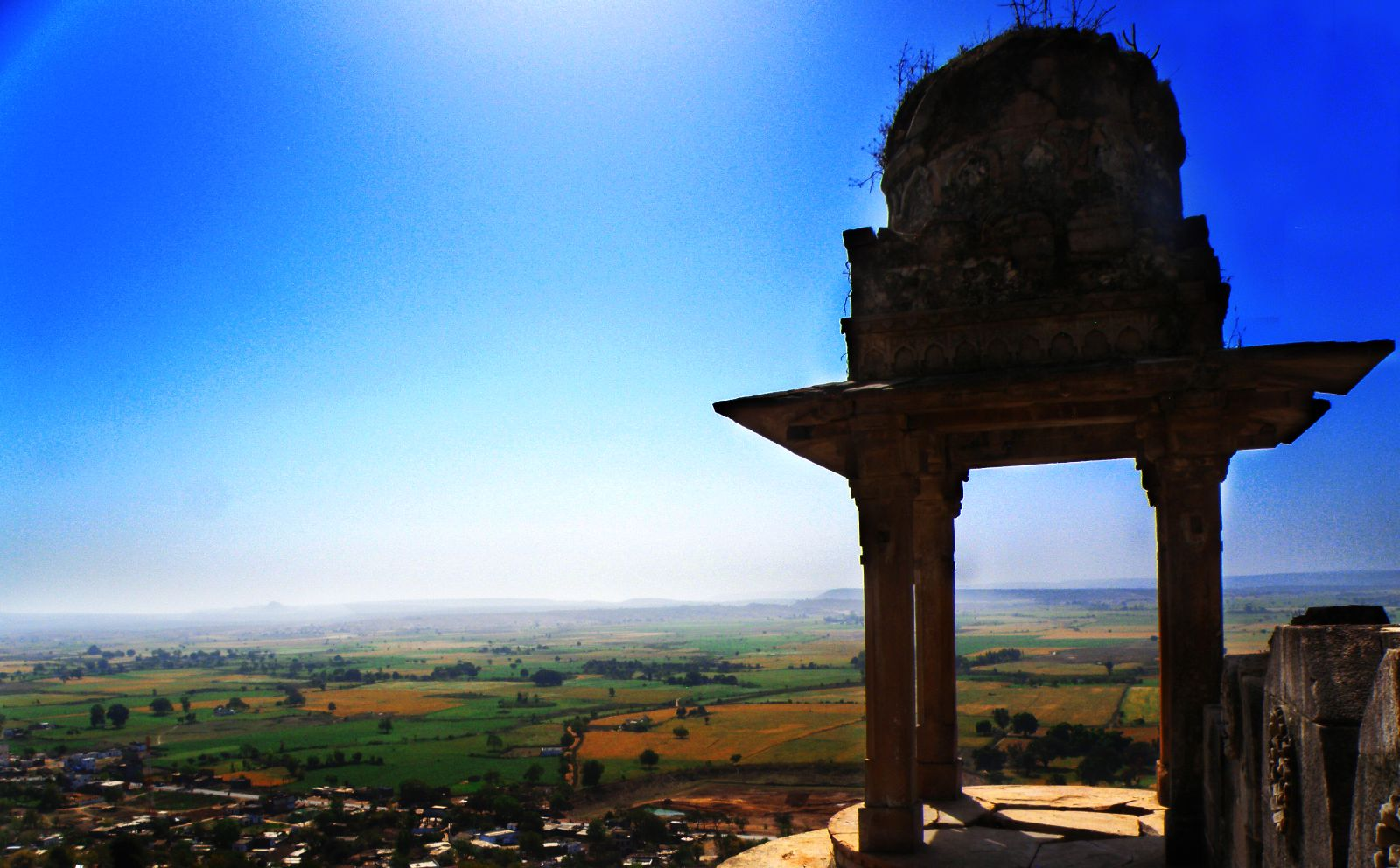
- Raisen fort

- Location within Madhya Pradesh Location within India
- Coordinates: 23.33°N 77.8°E
- Country: India
- State: Madhya Pradesh
- District: Raisen
- Named for: [[4 (palace)|Rai Ka Mahal]]

Government
  - MLA: Dr. PrabhuRam Chaudhary BJP
  - Mayor: Savita Jamna Sen BJP

Population (2011)
  - Total: 44,162
- Time zone: UTC+5:30 (IST)
- ISO 3166 code: IN-MP
- Vehicle registration: MP-38
- Website: raisen.nic.in

Raisen is a town and a municipality in Raisen district in the Indian state of Madhya Pradesh. It is the administrative headquarters of Raisen District. Raisen is 45.5 km (28.3 mi) from the state capital Bhopal.

== Geography ==
Raisen is located on 23.33°N 77.8°E. It has an average elevation of 303 metres (994 feet). The region is predominantly agrarian.

== Climate ==
Climate data for Raisen (1991-2020)
Month	Jan	Feb	Mar	Apr	May	Jun	Jul	Aug	Sep	Oct	Nov	Dec	Year
Record high °C (°F)	33.0 (91.4)	39.5 (103.1)	41.0 (105.8)	47.5 (117.5)	47.7 (117.9)	47.0 (116.6)	41.5 (106.7)	38.7 (101.7)	40.0 (104.0)	40.4 (104.7)	36.4 (97.5)	33.1 (91.6)	47.7 (117.9)
Mean daily maximum °C (°F)	25.1 (77.2)	29.6 (85.3)	34.1 (93.4)	37.5 (99.5)	40.7 (105.3)	36.6 (97.9)	30.9 (87.6)	29.4 (84.9)	30.6 (87.1)	31.5 (88.7)	27.8 (82.0)	25.0 (77.0)	31.5 (88.7)
Mean daily minimum °C (°F)	7.5 (45.5)	11.2 (52.2)	16.7 (62.1)	23.6 (74.5)	28.6 (83.5)	25.5 (77.9)	23.6 (74.5)	23.5 (74.3)	22.9 (73.2)	18.3 (64.9)	15.4 (59.7)	10.2 (50.4)	18.8 (65.8)
Record low °C (°F)	0.0 (32.0)	0.0 (32.0)	2.5 (36.5)	10.8 (51.4)	16.8 (62.2)	19.5 (67.1)	19.1 (66.4)	19.0 (66.2)	12.2 (54.0)	9.0 (48.2)	2.5 (36.5)	0.0 (32.0)	0.0 (32.0)
Source: India Meteorological Department

== Demographics ==
As of 2001 India census, Raisen had a population of 35,553. Males constitute 53% of the population and females 47%. Raisen has an average literacy rate of 66%, higher than the national average of 59.5%: male literacy is 72%, and female literacy is 59%. In Raisen, 15% of the population is under 6 years of age.

== Tourist attractions ==
Tourist place near Raisen include:

- Raisen Fort: The district headquarters, Raisen, is located on a high hill in the city and is one of the most important forts in Madhya Pradesh. Built in the 11th century, it was initially a stronghold of Hindu kings. Later, the fort was under the rule of Afghan and Mughal rulers.
- Sanchi Stupa: Sanchi town, located a short distance from Raisen, houses a very ancient and important Buddhist stupa, which is very important from the historical and spiritual point of view.

== Agriculture ==
Raisen district has a predominantly agricultural economy, with farming serving as the primary occupation for a majority of the population. The district's agricultural landscape is characterized by both traditional farming practices and gradual modernization efforts.

== Transportation ==
Raisen is well connected it from major Cities like Sagar, Bhopal and Vidisha. National Highway 146 passing through Raisen. Public and private buses operate regularly in the town.
