= Raisen district =

- District of Madhya Pradesh
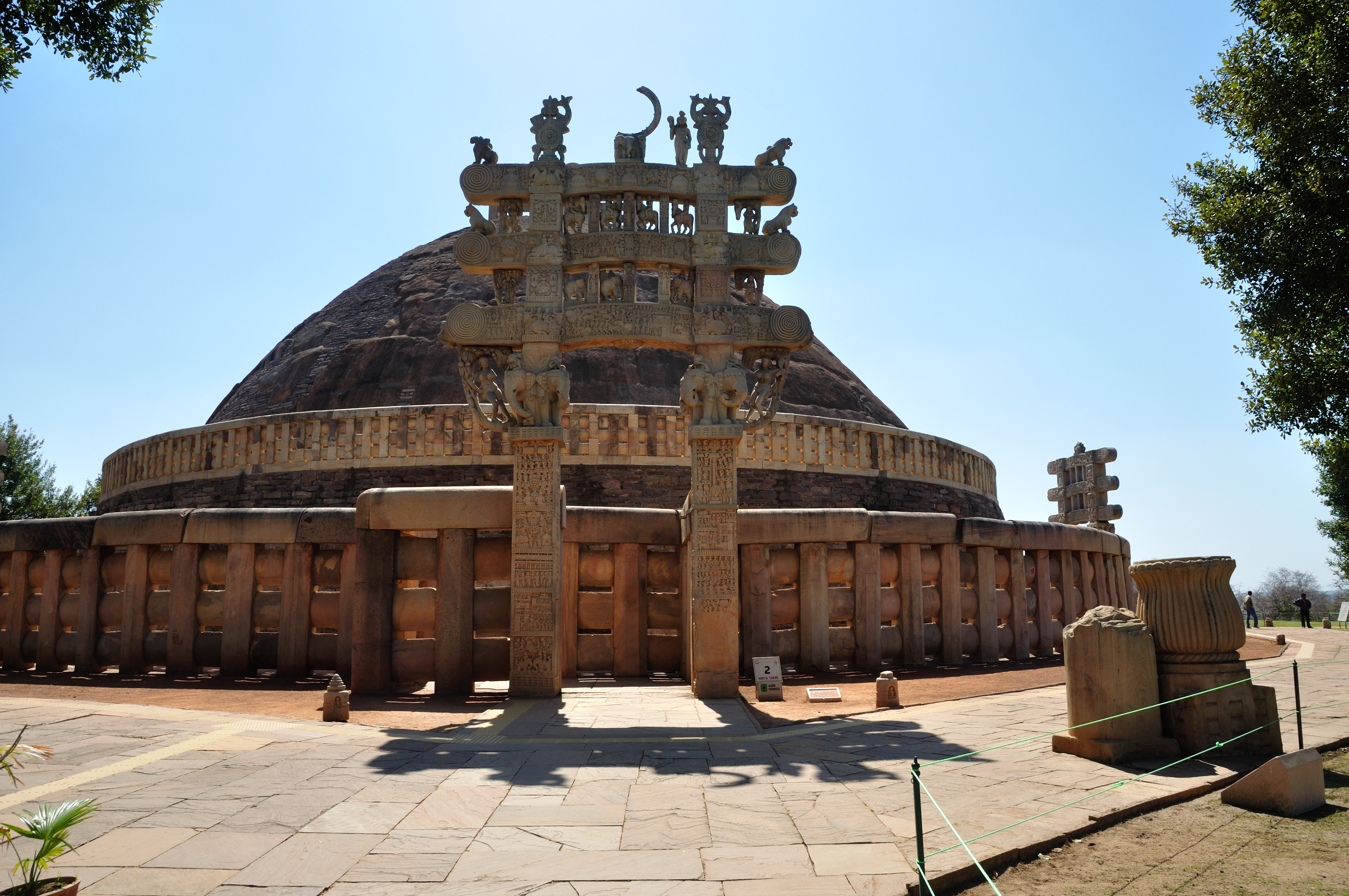
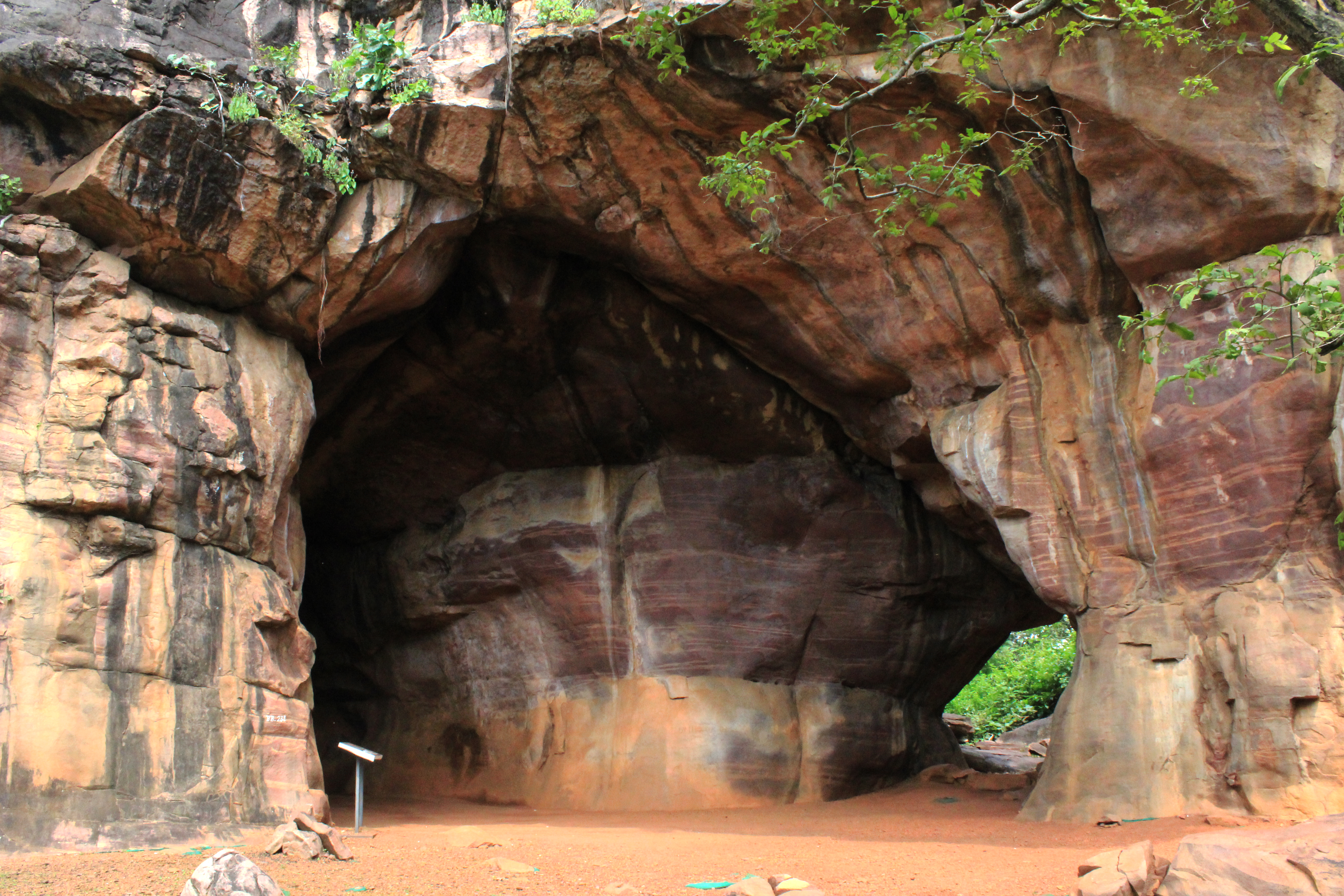
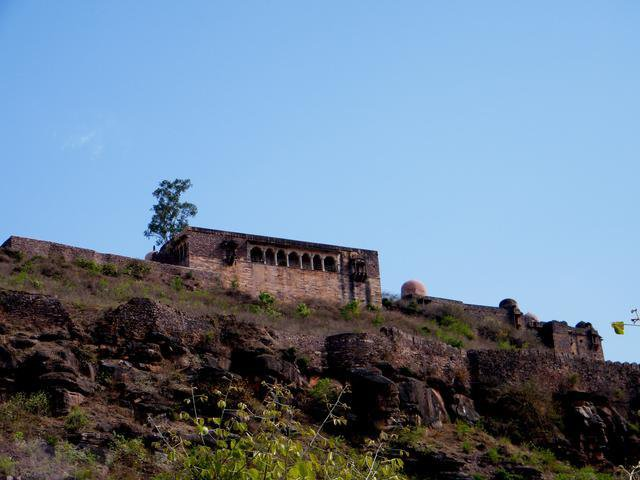
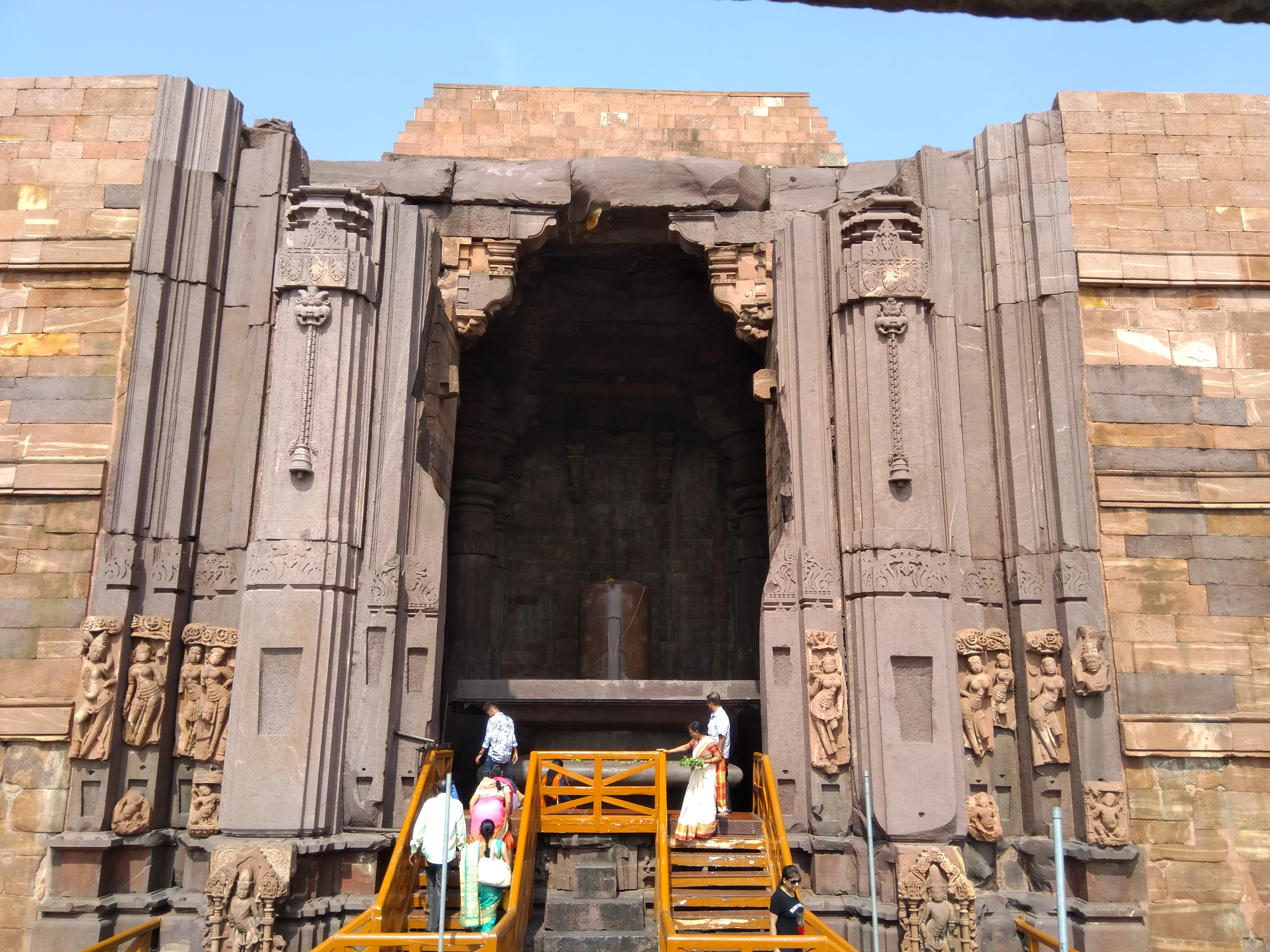
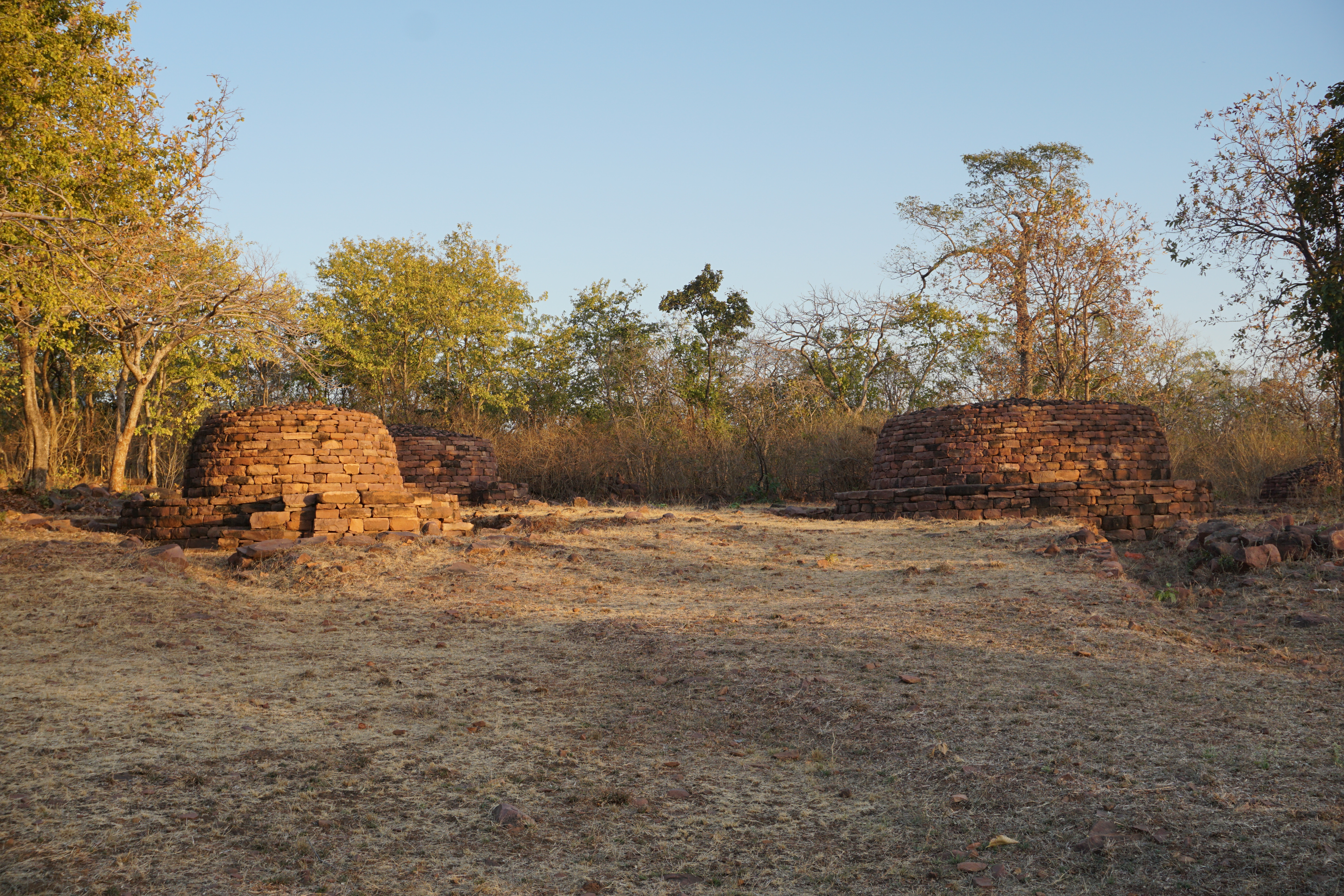
- Clockwise from top-left: Great Stupa of Sanchi, Bhimbetka rock shelters, Bhojeshwar Temple, stupas at Satdhara, view of Raisen Fort

- Location of Raisen district in Madhya Pradesh
- Coordinates (Raisen): 23°19′N 77°47′E
- Country: India
- State: Madhya Pradesh
- Division: Bhopal
- Headquarters: Raisen
- Tehsils: 10: 1. Raisen, 2. Goharganj; 3. Begamganj; 4. Gairatganj; 5. Silwani; 6. Baraily; 7. Udaipura; 8. Devri; 9. Sultanpur; 10. Badi

Area
  - Total: 8,399 km^{2} (3,243 sq mi)

Population (2011)
  - Total: 1,331,597
  - Density: 158.5/km^{2} (410.6/sq mi)

Demographics
  - Literacy: 74.26 per cent
  - Sex ratio: 899
- Time zone: UTC+05:30 (IST)
- Website: raisen.nic.in

Raisen district (Hindi pronunciation: [ɾajseːn]) is a district of Madhya Pradesh state of India. The town of Raisen is the district headquarters. The district is part of the Bhopal Division. Sanchi University of Buddhist-Indic Studies is the first international university located in Sanchi Town.

== Demographics ==
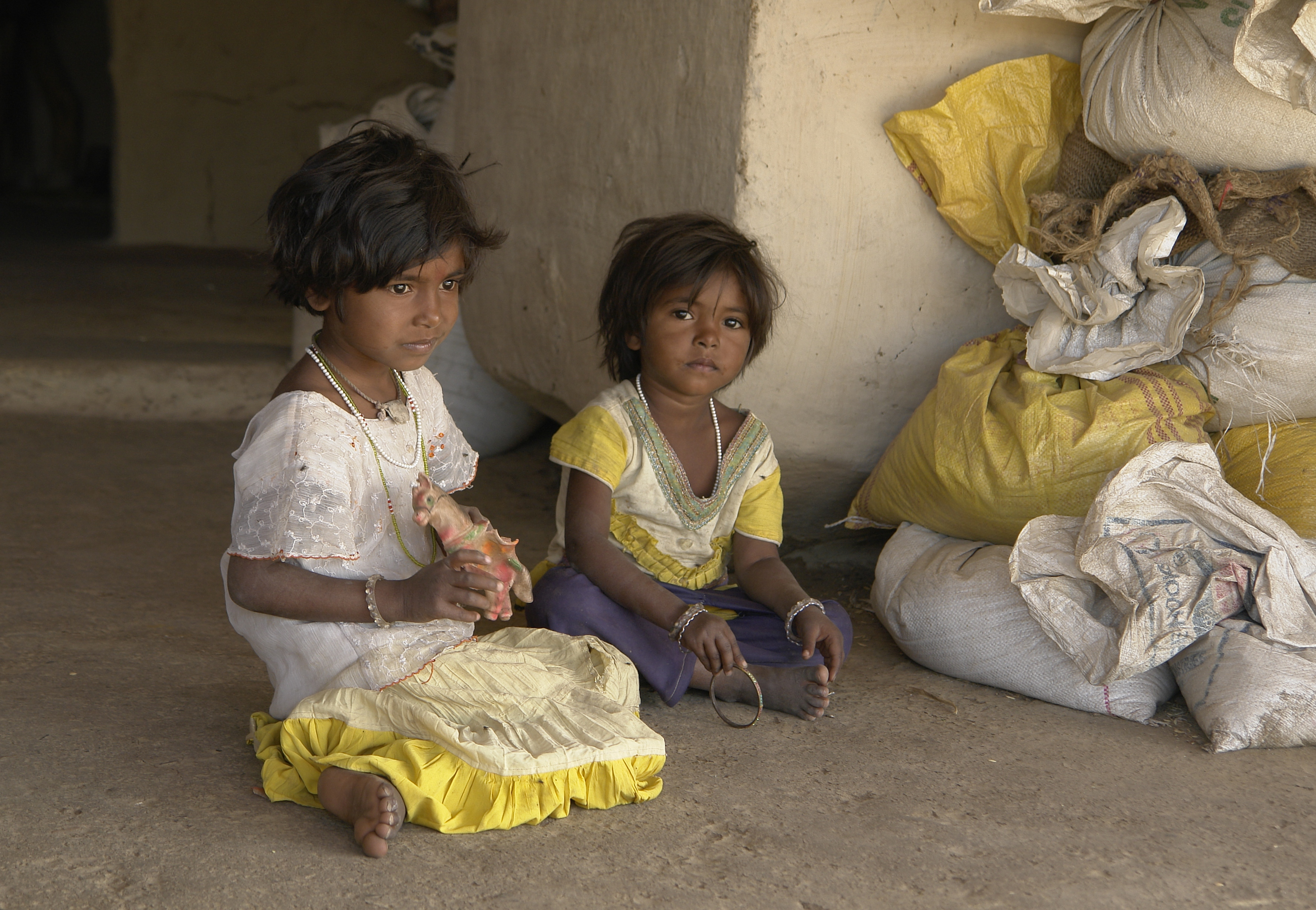
Younger girls in Raisen district

Historical population
Year	Pop.	±% p.a.
1901	295,219	—
1911	320,640	+0.83%
1921	301,575	−0.61%
1931	296,365	−0.17%
1941	310,369	+0.46%
1951	315,358	+0.16%
1961	411,426	+2.69%
1971	553,026	+3.00%
1981	710,542	+2.54%
1991	876,461	+2.12%
2001	1,125,154	+2.53%
2011	1,331,597	+1.70%

Religions in Raisen district (2011)
Religion	Percent
Hinduism	89.76%
Islam	9.04%
Jainism	0.80%
Other or not stated	0.40%

According to the 2011 census Raisen District has a population of 1,331,597, roughly equal to the nation of Mauritius or the US state of Maine. This gives it a ranking of 365th in India (out of a total of 640). The district has a population density of 157 inhabitants per square kilometre (410/sq mi) . Its population growth rate over the decade 2001-2011 was 18.36%. Raisen has a sex ratio of 899 females for every 1000 males, and a literacy rate of 74.26%. 22.79% of the population lives in urban areas. Scheduled Castes and Scheduled Tribes make up 16.96% and 15.40% of the population respectively.

Languages of Raisen district (2011)
1. Hindi (97.3%)
2. Urdu (1.99%)
3. Others (0.73%)

At the time of the 2011 Census of India, 97.28% of the population in the district spoke Hindi and 1.99% Urdu as their first language.

== Etymology ==
Raisen District takes its name from Raisen town, which is named after a fort. This fort is built on a sandstone hill, at the foot of which settles the town. The name is probably a corruption of Rajavasini or Rajasayan, the royal residence.

== Geography ==
Raisen district is situated between the latitude 22 47' and 23 33' north and the longitude 7721' and 78 49' east. Sehore District lies in west, Vidisha district in the north, Sagar district in the east and south-east, Narsimhapur district in the south-east, Narmadapuram and Sehore districts in the south. It covers an area of 8,395 square kilometres (3,241 sq mi).

Raisen district has Ten tehsils – Raisen, Goharganj, Begamganj, Gairatganj, Silwani, Baraily, Udaipura, Deori, Sultanpur and Badi.

== History ==
The territory of the present-day Raisen district was once part of the Nizamat-A-Mashrif district of the Bhopal princely state. After the Bhopal State of independent India came into being, Raisen was declared a separate district on 5 May 1950.

The Buddhist monuments at Sanchi, a UNESCO World Heritage Site, are located in Raisen district. Bhimbetka rock shelters, another UNESCO World Heritage Site, are also located in Raisen district.

== Tourism places ==
Raisen District has many tourism places like:

- Raisen fort:-Raisen fort is one of the ancient forts of Madhya Pradesh built in 11th century. It is located on the north west corner of the Gondwana on a hilltop on Vindhyanchal range. It has been known for Shiva temple and Mahashivaratri celebrations. Raisen fort has strong connection with Sallam (Salame) dynasty of Gondwana who has also erected two strong forts ( Ginnaurgarh fort and Fatehgarh fort) in Bhopal Gondwana kingdom. Raja Sangram Shah and Rani Durgavati of Garha Mandla had strongholds through many other Rajput kings on this fort until 1564. Sher Shah Suri also repeatedly tried to capture this fort after the 15th century.
- Sanchi:- World heritage, 46 km from Bhopal and 32 km from Vidisha
- Bhojpur:- The Bhojpur temple houses one of the largest Shiva lingam in India, which is 5.5 m (18 ft) tall and 2.3 m (7.5 ft) in circumference and is crafted out a single rock.
- Bheembetka:- It exhibits the earliest traces of human life in India and evidence of the Stone Age starting at the site in Acheulian times.It is located in the Raisen District in the Indian state of Madhya Pradesh,
- Chhind dham, - In Bareilly tehsil of Raisen district, about 7 kilometers away from Bareilly town, in a village named Chhind, there is a proven place of Ram devotee Hanuman ji, who is known by the name of Chhind wale Dada ji. There is a temple of Hanuman ji under a big tree in Chhind, in which the perfect idol of Hanuman ji is seated.

== Transportation ==
Raisen is 43.8 km from Bhopal. Its connected to Bhopal via NH-86. NH-12 also passes through the district.

Raisen does not have an airport, and the nearest airport is Bhopal, at a distance of 55 km from Raisen.

== Villages ==
- Dehgaon
- Bamhori
- Khargone
- Salamatpur
